= Claydon (deanery) =

Deanery within the Diocese of Oxford, England

Coordinates: 51.932°N 0.971°W

Claydon Deanery is part of the Archdeaconry of Buckingham within the Diocese of Oxford, England.

It includes four benefices, including two team benefices, which contain 20 parishes in rural north-west Buckinghamshire in England. The deanery also includes eight Church of England schools.

== List of Parishes ==
=== The Claydons (Benefice) ===
The Claydons (Parish)
St Mary, East Claydon
All Saints, Middle Claydon
St Michael, Steeple Claydon

=== Schorne Team ===
Dunton
St Martin
Granborough
St John the Baptist
Hardwick
St Mary the Virgin, Hardwick
Weedon School Chapel
Hoggeston
Holy Cross
North Marston
Assumption of the Blessed Virgin Mary
North Marston Church of England School
Oving with Pitchcott
All Saints, Oving
Quainton
Holy Cross & St Mary
Quainton Church of England Combined School
Waddesdon with Over Winchendon and Fleet Marston
St Mary Magdalene, Over Winchendon
St Michael & All Angels, Waddesdon
St Mary, Westcott
Waddesdon Church of England School
Westcott Church of England School
Whitchurch with Creslow
St John the Evangelist

=== Swan Team ===
Barton Hartshorn
St James
Chetwode
St Mary & St Nicholas
Edgcott
St Michael & All Angels
Grendon Underwood
St Leonard
Marsh Gibbon
St Mary the Virgin
Marsh Gibbon Church of England School
Preston Bissett
St John the Baptist
Twyford
Assumption of the Blessed Virgin Mary
Twyford Church of England School

=== Winslow, Great Horwood and Addington ===
Winslow
St Laurence
Winslow Church of England Combined School
Great Horwood
St James
Great Horwood Church of England Combined School
Addington
St Mary
