= Diocese of Oxford =

Diocese of the Church of England

Diocese of Oxford Dioecesis Oxoniensis
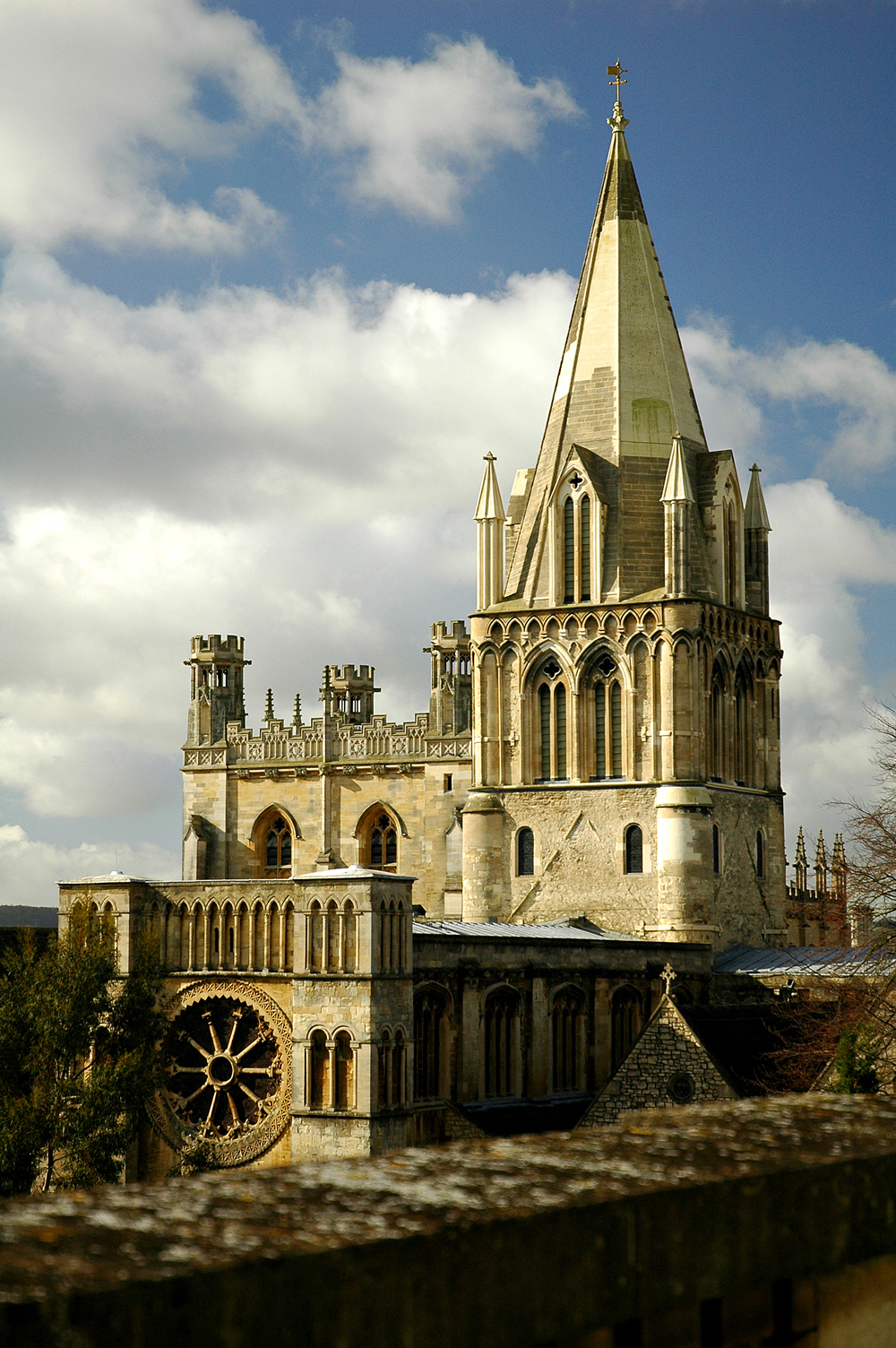
- Cathedral Church of Christ, Oxford

- Coat of arms

- Flag

Location
- Ecclesiastical province: Canterbury
- Archdeaconries: Oxford, Buckingham, Berkshire, Dorchester
- Coordinates: 51°49′51″N 1°18′17″W

Statistics
- Parishes: 624
- Churches: 847

Information
- Cathedral: Christ Church
- Language: English

Current leadership
- Bishop: Steven Croft, Bishop of Oxford
- Suffragans: Gavin Collins, area Bishop of Dorchester; Dave Bull, area Bishop of Buckingham; Mary Gregory, area Bishop of Reading
- Archdeacons: Jonathan Chaffey, Archdeacon of Oxford; Guy Elsmore, Archdeacon of Buckingham; Stephen Pullin, Archdeacon of Berkshire; David Tyler, Archdeacon of Dorchester

Website
- oxford.anglican.org

The Diocese of Oxford is a Church of England diocese that forms part of the Province of Canterbury. The diocese is led by the Bishop of Oxford (currently Steven Croft), and the bishop's seat is at Christ Church Cathedral, Oxford. It contains more church buildings than any other diocese and has more paid clergy than any other except London.

The diocese now covers the counties of Berkshire (118 churches), Buckinghamshire (152 churches), Oxfordshire (227 churches) and five churches in the nearby counties. Their 284 schools educate more than 68,000 students.

== History ==
The Diocese of Oxford was created by letters patent from Henry VIII on 1 September 1542, out of part of the Diocese of Lincoln. Osney Abbey was designated the original cathedral, but in 1545 this was changed to St Frideswide's Priory which became Christ Church Cathedral.

In 1836 the Archdeaconry of Berkshire was transferred from the Diocese of Salisbury to Oxford. This comprises the county of Berkshire and parts of Wiltshire.

An Order in Council of 1837 transferred the Archdeaconry of Buckingham from the Diocese of Lincoln.

In 2013 and 2014, the Diocese of Oxford discussed and resolved to undertake some pastoral alterations; the new archdeaconry of Dorchester was created on 1 March 2014. On 3 March 2014, it was announced that Judy French would become the first Archdeacon of Dorchester from June 2014.

== Bishops ==
The diocesan Bishop of Oxford is assisted by the area bishops of Dorchester, Buckingham, and Reading. The suffragan See of Buckingham was created in 1914, and was the suffragan bishopric for the whole diocese until 1939 when the See of Dorchester was created; the See of Reading was re-created in 1942, after having been 'in abeyance' since 1909.

The provincial episcopal visitor (for Anglo-Catholic parishes in the diocese – among twelve other dioceses in the western part of the Province of Canterbury – which do not accept the ordination of women as priests) is the Bishop of Oswestry, who is licensed as an honorary assistant bishop of the diocese in order to facilitate his ministry in the diocese. Conservative evangelicals who reject the ordination and/or leadership of women due to complementarian beliefs, receive alternative episcopal oversight from the Bishop of Ebbsfleet.

Several retired bishops resident in or near the diocese are licensed to serve as honorary assistant bishops. As of 7 July 2025:

- Since 2010: Anthony Russell, former Bishop of Ely and area Bishop of Dorchester, lives in Holton.
- Since 2010: Henry Scriven, Mission Director for Latin America (CMS) and former Assistant Bishop in Pittsburgh and Suffragan Bishop in Europe, lives in Abingdon-on-Thames and is also licensed in Chichester and Winchester dioceses.
- Since 2013: David Jennings, retired former Bishop suffragan of Warrington, lives in Northleach, Gloucestershire and is also licensed in Gloucester diocese.
- Since 2013: John Went, former Bishop suffragan of Tewkesbury, lives in Latimer.

George Carey (retired Archbishop of Canterbury) lives in the diocese and was an honorary assistant bishop, but resigned his licence following his implication in the Peter Ball abuse case, and Humphrey Southern, former Bishop suffragan of Repton, is the Principal of Ripon College Cuddesdon.

== Current extent ==
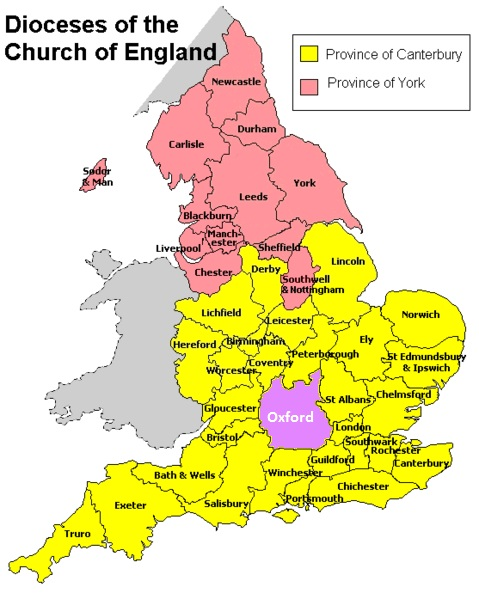
Map of the dioceses of the Church of England showing Oxford Diocese in mauve

=== Counties ===
The diocese now covers the counties of

- Berkshire (118 churches)
- Buckinghamshire (152 churches)
- Oxfordshire (227 churches)

and has

- three churches in the county of Bedfordshire
- one church in the traditional county of Middlesex
- one church in the county of Hampshire

=== Episcopal areas ===
Since the creation of an area scheme in 1984, the diocese has been divided into three episcopal areas. The Bishop of Oxford has authority throughout the diocese, but also has primary responsibility for the city and suburbs of Oxford, which form the Archdeaconry of Oxford.

- City of Oxford and surrounding area (Archdeaconry of Oxford)
  - current Bishop of Oxford: Steven Croft
  - includes Deaneries of Oxford and Cowley
- Dorchester Episcopal Area (Archdeaconry of Dorchester)
  - current area Bishop of Dorchester: Gavin Collins
  - includes Deaneries of Aston & Cuddesdon, Bicester & Islip, Chipping Norton, Deddington, Henley, Witney and Woodstock
- Buckingham Episcopal Area (Archdeaconry of Buckingham)
  - current area Bishop of Buckingham: Dave Bull
  - includes Deaneries of Amersham, Aylesbury, Buckingham, Burnham & Slough, Claydon, Milton Keynes, Mursley, Newport, Wendover and Wycombe
- Reading Episcopal Area (Archdeaconry of Berkshire)
  - current area Bishop of Reading: Mary Gregory
  - includes Deaneries of Abingdon, Bracknell, Bradfield, Maidenhead & Windsor, Newbury, Reading, Sonning, Vale of White Horse, Wallingford and Wantage

=== Archdeaconries and deaneries ===
Episcopal area	Archdeaconries	Rural Deaneries	Paid clergy	Churches	Population	People/clergy	People/church	Churches/clergy
Oxford Episcopal Area (Bishop of Oxford)	Archdeaconry of Oxford	Deanery of Oxford	34*	26*	68,686*	2,020	2,642	0.76
Oxford Episcopal Area (Bishop of Oxford)	Archdeaconry of Oxford	Deanery of Cowley	15	17	104,650	6,977	6,156	1.13
Dorchester Episcopal Area (area Bishop of Dorchester)	Archdeaconry of Dorchester	Deanery of Abingdon	14	27	66,687	4,763	2,470	1.93
Dorchester Episcopal Area (area Bishop of Dorchester)	Archdeaconry of Dorchester	Deanery of Aston & Cuddesdon	18	51	54,913	3,051	1,077	2.83
Dorchester Episcopal Area (area Bishop of Dorchester)	Archdeaconry of Dorchester	Deanery of Bicester & Islip	10	39	51,494	5,149	1,320	3.9
Dorchester Episcopal Area (area Bishop of Dorchester)	Archdeaconry of Dorchester	Deanery of Chipping Norton	9	30	23,903	2,656	797	3.33
Dorchester Episcopal Area (area Bishop of Dorchester)	Archdeaconry of Dorchester	Deanery of Deddington	14	34	66,505	4,750	1,956	2.43
Dorchester Episcopal Area (area Bishop of Dorchester)	Archdeaconry of Dorchester	Deanery of Henley	9	25	36,686	4,076	1,467	2.78
Dorchester Episcopal Area (area Bishop of Dorchester)	Archdeaconry of Dorchester	Deanery of Vale of White Horse	6	27	19,494	3,249	722	4.5
Dorchester Episcopal Area (area Bishop of Dorchester)	Archdeaconry of Dorchester	Deanery of Wallingford	10	19	47,500	4,750	2,500	1.9
Dorchester Episcopal Area (area Bishop of Dorchester)	Archdeaconry of Dorchester	Deanery of Wantage	5	16	24,685	4,937	1,543	3.2
Dorchester Episcopal Area (area Bishop of Dorchester)	Archdeaconry of Dorchester	Deanery of Witney	13	38	63,884	4,914	1,681	2.92
Dorchester Episcopal Area (area Bishop of Dorchester)	Archdeaconry of Dorchester	Deanery of Woodstock	9	24	25,404	2,823	1,059	2.67
Buckingham Episcopal Area (area Bishop of Buckingham)	Archdeaconry of Buckingham	Deanery of Amersham	23	31	111,702	4,857	3,603	1.35
Buckingham Episcopal Area (area Bishop of Buckingham)	Archdeaconry of Buckingham	Deanery of Aylesbury	19	37	104,369	5,493	2,821	1.95
Buckingham Episcopal Area (area Bishop of Buckingham)	Archdeaconry of Buckingham	Deanery of Buckingham	6	22	21,214	3,536	964	3.67
Buckingham Episcopal Area (area Bishop of Buckingham)	Archdeaconry of Buckingham	Deanery of Burnham & Slough	20	31	193,635	9,682	6,246	1.55
Buckingham Episcopal Area (area Bishop of Buckingham)	Archdeaconry of Buckingham	Deanery of Claydon	5	25	21,125	4,225	845	5
Buckingham Episcopal Area (area Bishop of Buckingham)	Archdeaconry of Buckingham	Deanery of Milton Keynes	15	29	213,304	14,220	7,355	1.93
Buckingham Episcopal Area (area Bishop of Buckingham)	Archdeaconry of Buckingham	Deanery of Mursley	5	20	21,444	4,289	1,072	4
Buckingham Episcopal Area (area Bishop of Buckingham)	Archdeaconry of Buckingham	Deanery of Newport	5	22	32,175	6,435	1,463	4.4
Buckingham Episcopal Area (area Bishop of Buckingham)	Archdeaconry of Buckingham	Deanery of Wendover	8	22	35,262	4,408	1,603	2.75
Buckingham Episcopal Area (area Bishop of Buckingham)	Archdeaconry of Buckingham	Deanery of Wycombe	18	36	150,610	8,367	4,184	2
Reading Episcopal Area (area Bishop of Reading)	Archdeaconry of Berkshire	Deanery of Bracknell	11	19	103,874	9,443	5,467	1.73
Reading Episcopal Area (area Bishop of Reading)	Archdeaconry of Berkshire	Deanery of Bradfield	9	26	36,891	4,099	1,419	2.89
Reading Episcopal Area (area Bishop of Reading)	Archdeaconry of Berkshire	Deanery of Maidenhead & Windsor	20	24	110,456	5,523	4,602	1.2
Reading Episcopal Area (area Bishop of Reading)	Archdeaconry of Berkshire	Deanery of Newbury	16	40	96,347	6,022	2,409	2.5
Reading Episcopal Area (area Bishop of Reading)	Archdeaconry of Berkshire	Deanery of Reading	36	35	245,892	6,830	7,025	0.97
Reading Episcopal Area (area Bishop of Reading)	Archdeaconry of Berkshire	Deanery of Sonning	20	24	112,039	5,602	4,668	1.2
Total/average			403	816	2,264,830	5,620	2,776	2.02

*including Cathedral

== Churches ==
=== Outside deanery structures ===
Benefice	Churches	Clergy	Population served	Ref
Cathedra	Christ Church Cathedral, Oxford	Dean: Sarah Foot; Sub-Dean: Peter Moger; Canon: Carol Harrison; Canon: Graham Ward; Canon: Sally Welch	512	

=== Deanery of Oxford ===
Benefice	Churches	Link	Clergy	Population served	Ref
Hinksey, South (St Laurence)	St Laurence, South Hinksey; St John the Evangelist, New Hinksey		Vicar: Vacant; Curate: Benjamin Drury	2,481	
Kidlington (St Mary the Virgin) with Hampton Poyle	St Mary the Virgin, Kidlington; St Mary the Virgin, Hampton Poyle; St John the Baptist, South Kidlington		Team Rector: Felicity Scroggie; Team Vicar: Martin Davis; Curate: Laura Biron-Scott	14,850	
Osney (St Frideswide)	St Frideswide, Osney; SS Peter & Paul, Botley; St Lawrence, North Hinksey; St Margaret of Antioch, Binsey		Rector: Clare Sykes; Curate: Katherine Seagrave; SSM: Martin Henig; SSM: Jo Moffett-Levy	7,245	
Oxford (St Aldate)	St Aldate, Oxford		Rector: Charlie Cleverly; Pastorate Chaplain: Simon Ponsonby; Curate: Will Donaldson; Curate: Tim Bateman; SSM: Mark Brickman; SSM: Christopher Landau; SSM: Daniel Hames	727	
Oxford (St Andrew)	St Andrew, Oxford		Vicar: Dan Heyward; Curate: Paul White; Curate: James Dwyer; SSM: Elizabeth Pitkethly	2,991	
Oxford (St Barnabas and St Paul) (St Thomas the Martyr)	St Barnabas, Oxford; St Thomas the Martyr, Oxford		Vicar: Vacant; Curate: Susan Gillingham	5,583	
Oxford (St Ebbe with Holy Trinity and St Peter-Le-Bailey)	St Ebbe, Oxford		Rector: Vaughan Roberts; Curate: Pete Wilkinson; Curate: Joel Knight; Curate: Matt Pope; Curate: Leon Catallo; SSM: James Poole; SSM: John Miller	1,443	
Oxford (St Ebbe with Holy Trinity and St Peter-Le-Bailey)	St Ebbe's Headington^{1}		Rector: Vaughan Roberts; Curate: Pete Wilkinson; Curate: Joel Knight; Curate: Matt Pope; Curate: Leon Catallo; SSM: James Poole; SSM: John Miller	1,443	
Oxford (St Giles) St Philip and St James (St Margaret)	St Giles, Oxford		Vicar: Anthony Bunch; Curate: Tom Albinson	7,885	
Oxford (St Giles) St Philip and St James (St Margaret)	St Margaret, Oxford		Vicar: Anthony Bunch; Curate: Tom Albinson	7,885	
Oxford (St Mary Magdalen)	St Mary Magdalen, Oxford		Vicar: Peter Groves; Curate: Jarred Mercer; SSM: Jonathan Jong	1,176	
Oxford (St Mary the Virgin) (St Cross Or Holywell) (St Peter in the East)	St Mary the Virgin, Oxford		Vicar: William Lamb; Curate: James Crockford; SSM: Charlotte Bannister-Parker; SSM: Alan Ramsey	5,229	
Oxford (St Matthew)	St Matthew, Oxford		Rector: Steve Hellyer; Curate: Stephen Tuck; SSM: Timothy Bradshaw; SSM: Jane Lees; SSM: Mike Rayner	3,154	
Oxford (St Matthew)	St Luke, Oxford		Rector: Steve Hellyer; Curate: Stephen Tuck; SSM: Timothy Bradshaw; SSM: Jane Lees; SSM: Mike Rayner	3,154	
Oxford (St Michael At the North Gate with St Martin and All Saints)	St Michael at the North Gate, Oxford		Vicar: Anthony Buckley	1,155	
Summertown (St Michael and All Angels)	St Michael & All Angels, Summertown		Vicar: Gavin Knight; SSM: William Pryor	7,840	
Wolvercote (St Peter) and Wytham	St Peter, Wolvercote		Vicar: Kate Tuckett; Associate Priest: William Whyte	6,415	
Wolvercote (St Peter) and Wytham	All Saints, Wytham		Vicar: Kate Tuckett; Associate Priest: William Whyte	6,415	

^{1}situated within the area covered by the Cowley deanery

=== Deanery of Cowley ===
Benefice	Churches	Link	Clergy	Population served
Blackbird Leys (Holy Family)	Holy Family, Blackbird Leys (LEP)		Vicar: Heather Carter	13,073
Cowley (St James) (St Francis)	St James, Cowley; St Francis, Cowley		Team Rector: Geoffrey Bayliss; Team Vicar: Vacant; SSM: Richard Chand; SSM: Gordon Hickson	20,144
Cowley (St John) (St Alban) (St Bart) (St Mary & St John)	SS Mary & John, Cowley; St Alban, Cowley; St Bartholomew's Chapel, Oxford		Vicar: Philip Ritchie; SSM: Sabina Alkire; SSM: Matt Rees	14,909
Headington (St Andrew)	St Andrew, Headington		Vicar: Darren McFarland; Curate: Tim Howles	7,010
Headington (St Mary)	St Mary, Headington		Vicar: Eric Bossward	6,131
Headington Quarry (Holy Trinity)	Holy Trinity, Headington Quarry		Vicar: Tim Stead; SSM: Robert Gilbert	10,659
Highfield (All Saints)	All Saints, Headington		Vicar: Now vacant	3,660
Iffley (St Mary the Virgin)	St Mary the Virgin, Iffley		Vicar: Andrew McKearney; SSM: William Beaver	7,470
Littlemore (St Mary the Virgin and St Nicholas)	SS Mary & Nicholas, Littlemore		Priest-in-Charge: Margreet Armitstead; Curate: Hannah Cartwright; SSM: Teresa Morgan	5,632
Marston (St Nicholas) with Elsfield	St Nicholas, Marston; St Thomas of Canterbury, Elsfield		Vicar: Elizabeth Denno	3,553
Marston, New (St Michael and All Angels)	St Michael & All Angels, New Marston		Vicar: Elaine Bardwell	6,670
Oxford (St Clement)	St Clement, Oxford		Rector: Rachel Gibson; Curate: Philip Lockley	4,519
Sandford-On-Thames (St Andrew)	St Andrew, Sandford-on-Thames		Hon. Priest-in-Charge: Robert Morgan	1,220

=== Deanery of Abingdon ===
Deanery website

Benefice	Churches	Link	Clergy	Population served
Abingdon, North (Christ Church)	Christ Church Abingdon		Vicar: Keith Dunnett; Associate Vicar: James Whymark; Associate Minister: Ros Steel; Curate: Robin Emmanuel	16,103
Abingdon, North (Christ Church)	Christ Church Long Furlong		Vicar: Keith Dunnett; Associate Vicar: James Whymark; Associate Minister: Ros Steel; Curate: Robin Emmanuel	16,103
Peachcroft Christian Centre	Peachcroft Christian Centre (LEP)		Minister: David Masters	16,103
Abingdon-On-Thames (St Helen) (St Michael and All Angels) (St Nicolas)	St Helen, Abingdon		Team Rector: Jen Brown; Team Vicar: Vacant; Associate Priest: A. K. M. Adam	16,457
Abingdon-On-Thames (St Helen) (St Michael and All Angels) (St Nicolas)	St Michael & All Angels, Abingdon		Team Rector: Jen Brown; Team Vicar: Vacant; Associate Priest: A. K. M. Adam	16,457
Abingdon-On-Thames (St Helen) (St Michael and All Angels) (St Nicolas)	St Nicolas, Abingdon		Team Rector: Jen Brown; Team Vicar: Vacant; Associate Priest: A. K. M. Adam	16,457
Appleton with Besselsleigh	St Laurence, Appleton		Rector: Wealands Bell	1,026
Cumnor (St Michael)	St Michael, Cumnor; St Andrew, Dean Court; St Mary, Farmoor		Vicar: Vacant; Honorary Associate Minister: David Wenham; Honorary Associate Minister: Chris Sugden; Honorary Associate Minister: Jessica Turner	5,878
Damascus, Comprising Appleford, Drayton, Milton, Steventon, and Sutton Courtenay	SS Peter & Paul, Appleford; St Peter, Drayton; St Blaise, Milton; St Michael & All Angels, Steventon; All Saints, Sutton Courtenay		Rector: Helen Kendrick; Associate Priest: Philip Sutton; Associate Priest: Rosie Bruce	7,902
Dry Sandford (St Helen)	St Helen, Dry Sandford		Vicar: Vacant	897
Fyfield (St Nicholas) with Tubney and Kingston Bagpuize	St Nicholas, Fyfield; St Lawrence, Tubney		Vicar: Vacant	2,759
Fyfield (St Nicholas) with Tubney and Kingston Bagpuize	St John the Baptist, Kingston Bagpuize		Vicar: Vacant	2,759
Marcham (All Saints) with Garford and Shippon	All Saints, Marcham; St Luke, Garford		Vicar: Nick Weldon	3,912
Marcham (All Saints) with Garford and Shippon	St Mary Magdalene, Shippon		Vicar: Nick Weldon	3,912
Radley (St James the Great), Sunningwell and Kennington	St James the Great, Radley		Rector: Robert Glenny; Curate: Anne Curtis; Associate Priest: Pat Bhutta; Associate Priest: Glynis Beckett	8,596
Radley (St James the Great), Sunningwell and Kennington	St Swithun, Kennington		Rector: Robert Glenny; Curate: Anne Curtis; Associate Priest: Pat Bhutta; Associate Priest: Glynis Beckett	8,596
Radley (St James the Great), Sunningwell and Kennington	St Leonard, Sunningwell		Rector: Robert Glenny; Curate: Anne Curtis; Associate Priest: Pat Bhutta; Associate Priest: Glynis Beckett	8,596
Wootton (St Peter)	St Peter, Wootton		Vicar: Stephen Coe	3,157

=== Deanery of Aston and Cuddesdon ===
Benefice	Churches	Link	Clergy	Population served
Albury (St Helen) with Tiddington, Holton, Waterperry, Waterstock and Wheatley	St Helen, Albury; St Bartholomew, Holton; St Mary the Virgin, Waterperry; St Leonard, Waterstock; St Mary the Virgin, Wheatley		Vicar: Nigel Hawkes; Curate: David Bendor-Samuel	5,138
Beckley (Assumption of the Blessed Virgin Mary), Forest Hill, Horton-Cum-Studley and Stanton St John	Assumption of the Blessed Virgin Mary, Beckley; St Nicholas the Confessor, Forest Hill; St Barnabas, Horton-cum-Studley; St John the Baptist, Stanton St John		Vicar: Andrew Pritchard-Keens; SSM: Hugh Lee	1,920
Benson (St Helen) with Ewelme	St Helen, Benson; St Bartholomew, Brightwell Baldwin; Holy Rood, Cuxham; St Peter, Easington; St Mary the Virgin, Ewelme		Rector: Patrick Gilday	6,392
Chalgrove (St Mary) with Berrick Salome	St Mary, Chalgrove		Vicar: Michael Lakey	2,952
Chalgrove (St Mary) with Berrick Salome	St Helen, Berrick Salome		Vicar: Michael Lakey	2,952
Chinnor (St Andrew), Sydenham, Aston Rowant and Crowell	St Andrew, Chinnor; SS Peter & Paul, Aston Rowant; Nativity of the Blessed Virgin Mary, Crowell; St Mary, Sydenham		Rector: Margaret Thorne; Curate: Jacqueline Barr	7,176
Dorchester (St Peter and St Paul)	Abbey Church of SS Peter & Paul, Dorchester; SS Mary & Berin, Berinsfield; St Michael & All Angels, Clifton Hampden; St Paul, Culham; SS Leonard & Catherine, Drayton St Leonard; St Mary the Virgin, Long Wittenham; St Peter, Little Wittenham; St Peter, Marsh Baldon; St Lawrence, Toot Baldon; St Giles, Newington; St John the Baptist, Stadhampton		Team Rector/Rector: Sue Booys; Team Vicar (Dorchester): Caroline King; Team Vicar (Dorchester): Paul Cawthorne; Curate (Dorchester): Jon Roberts; Curate (Dorchester): Jennifer Morton	8,832
Warborough (St Lawrence)	St Lawrence, Warborough		Team Rector/Rector: Sue Booys; Team Vicar (Dorchester): Caroline King; Team Vicar (Dorchester): Paul Cawthorne; Curate (Dorchester): Jon Roberts; Curate (Dorchester): Jennifer Morton	8,832
Garsington (St Mary), Cuddesdon and Horspath	St Mary, Garsington; All Saints, Cuddesdon; St Giles, Horspath		Vicar: Emma Pennington; SSM: Mark Chapman	3,581
Icknield, Comprising Britwell Salome, Pyrton and Shirburn, Swyncombe, and Watlington	St Botolph, Swyncombe		Rector: Daniel Thompson; SSM: Angie Paterson	3,573
Icknield, Comprising Britwell Salome, Pyrton and Shirburn, Swyncombe, and Watlington	St Leonard, Watlington		Rector: Daniel Thompson; SSM: Angie Paterson	3,573
Icknield, Comprising Britwell Salome, Pyrton and Shirburn, Swyncombe, and Watlington	St Nicholas, Britwell Salome; St Mary, Pyrton		Rector: Daniel Thompson; SSM: Angie Paterson	3,573
Milton, Great (St Mary the Virgin) with Little (St James) and Great Haseley	St Mary the Virgin, Great Milton; St James, Little Milton; St Peter, Great Haseley		Rector: Simon Cronk	1,797
Thame (St Mary the Virgin) (Barley Hill Church)	St Mary the Virgin, Thame; Barley Hill Church, Thame; St Mary, Adwell; St Margaret, Lewknor; St Lawrence, South Weston; St Mary Magdalene, Stoke Talmage; St Giles, Tetsworth; St Catherine, Towersey; St Andrew, Wheatfield		Team Rector: Alan Garratt; Team Vicar: Rachel Cross; Curate: Michael Reading; SSM: Graham Waterson; SSM: Graham Choldcroft; Hon. Curate: Simon Baynes; Hon. Curate: Raymond Copping	13,552

=== Deanery of Bicester and Islip ===
Benefice	Churches	Link	Clergy	Population served
Akeman, Comprising Bletchingdon, Chesterton, Hampton Gay, Kirtlington, Middleton Stoney, Wendlebury, Weston-On-The-Green	St Giles, Bletchingdon; St Mary, Great Chesterton; St Giles, Hampton Gay; St Mary the Virgin, Kirtlington; All Saints, Middleton Stoney; St Giles, Wendlebury; St Mary, Weston-on-the-Green		Rector: John Miller; SSM: Brian Wood	4,042
Bicester (St Edburg) with Bucknell, Caversfield and Launton	St Edburg, Bicester		Team Rector: Verena Breed; Team Vicar: Ian Biscoe; Team Vicar: Peter Wright; Curate: Erika Biscoe; Curate: April Beckerleg; SSM: Robert Atkins; SSM: Peter Hill; OLM: Carol Hill	34,100
Bicester (St Edburg) with Bucknell, Caversfield and Launton	Emmanuel, Bicester (2002)		Team Rector: Verena Breed; Team Vicar: Ian Biscoe; Team Vicar: Peter Wright; Curate: Erika Biscoe; Curate: April Beckerleg; SSM: Robert Atkins; SSM: Peter Hill; OLM: Carol Hill	34,100
Bicester (St Edburg) with Bucknell, Caversfield and Launton	St Laurence, Caversfield; St Peter, Bucknell; Assumption of the Blessed Virgin Mary, Launton		Team Rector: Verena Breed; Team Vicar: Ian Biscoe; Team Vicar: Peter Wright; Curate: Erika Biscoe; Curate: April Beckerleg; SSM: Robert Atkins; SSM: Peter Hill; OLM: Carol Hill	34,100
Cherwell Valley, Comprising Ardley with Fewcott, Fritwell, Lower Heyford, Somerton, Souldern, and Upper Heyford	St Mary, Ardley; St Olave, Fritwell; St Mary, Lower Heyford; St James, Somerton; Annunciation of the Blessed Virgin Mary, Souldern; St Mary, Upper Heyford; Heyford Park Chapel		Team Rector: Stephen Griffiths; Team Vicar: Geoff Price	3,968
Ray Valley, The, Comprising Ambrosden, Charlton-On-Otmoor, Islip, Merton, Noke, Oddington, Piddington, and Woodeaton	St Nicholas, Islip		Rector: Steve Hayes; OLM: Lisa Holmes; Hon. Curate: Lucy Thirtle	6,800
Ray Valley, The, Comprising Ambrosden, Charlton-On-Otmoor, Islip, Merton, Noke, Oddington, Piddington, and Woodeaton	St Andrew, Oddington		Rector: Steve Hayes; OLM: Lisa Holmes; Hon. Curate: Lucy Thirtle	6,800
Ray Valley, The, Comprising Ambrosden, Charlton-On-Otmoor, Islip, Merton, Noke, Oddington, Piddington, and Woodeaton	St Mary the Virgin, Ambrosden; St Mary, Charlton-on-Otmoor; Murcott Mission Room; St Swithun, Merton; St Giles, Noke; St Nicholas, Piddington; Holy Rood, Woodeaton		Rector: Steve Hayes; OLM: Lisa Holmes; Hon. Curate: Lucy Thirtle	6,800
Rousham (St Leonard and St James)	SS Leonard & James, Rousham		Hon. Priest-in-Charge: Richard Smail	50
Shelswell, Comprising Cottisford and Hardwick-Cum-Tusmore, Finmere, Fringford, Hethe, Mixbury, Newton Purcell with Shelswell, Stoke Lyne, and Stratton Audley and Godington	St Mary the Virgin, Cottisford; St Mary, Hardwick-cum-Tusmore; St Michael, Finmere; St Michael, Fringford; SS Edmund, King & Martyr, & George, Hethe; All Saints, Mixbury; St Michael, Newton Purcell; St Peter, Stoke Lyne; Holy Trinity, Godington; SS Mary & Edburga, Stratton Audley		Rector: Alice Goodall; SSM: Bill Muncey	2,534

=== Deanery of Chipping Norton ===
Benefice	Churches	Link	Clergy	Population served
Charlbury (St Mary the Virgin) with Shorthampton	St Mary the Virgin, Charlbury; All Saints, Shorthampton		Vicar: Sally Welch; SSM: Janice Fielden	2,901
Chase, Comprising Ascott-Under-Wychwood, Chadlington, Enstone, and Spelsbury	Holy Trinity, Ascott-under-Wychwood; St Nicholas, Chadlington; St Kenelm, Enstone; All Saints, Spelsbury		Rector: Mark Abrey	2,844
Chipping Norton (St Mary the Virgin)	St Mary the Virgin, Chipping Norton		Team Rector: James Kennedy; Team Vicar: David Salter; Curate: Jackie Jones; Curate: Martha Simpson; SSM: Stephen Blake; Hon. Curate: Roger Simpson; Hon. Curate: Ursula Simpson	9,279
Chipping Norton (St Mary the Virgin)	All Saints, Churchill; St Andrew, Kingham		Team Rector: James Kennedy; Team Vicar: David Salter; Curate: Jackie Jones; Curate: Martha Simpson; SSM: Stephen Blake; Hon. Curate: Roger Simpson; Hon. Curate: Ursula Simpson	9,279
Chipping Norton (St Mary the Virgin)	St James, Over Norton; St Mary the Virgin, Chastleton; St Denys, Little Compton; St Peter, Cornwell; St Philip, Little Rollright; St Mary, Salford		Team Rector: James Kennedy; Team Vicar: David Salter; Curate: Jackie Jones; Curate: Martha Simpson; SSM: Stephen Blake; Hon. Curate: Roger Simpson; Hon. Curate: Ursula Simpson	9,279
Forest Edge, Comprising Finstock with Fawler, Leafield with Wychwood, Ramsden, and Wilcote	Holy Trinity, Finstock; St Michael & All Angels, Leafield; St James, Ramsden; St Peter, Wilcote		Vicar: Paul Mansell; SSM: Sarah Jones	2,184
Hook Norton (St Peter) with Great Rollright, Swerford and Wigginton	St Peter, Hook Norton		Rector: John Acreman; SSM: Christopher Turner; SSM: Wendy Cunningham	2,959
Hook Norton (St Peter) with Great Rollright, Swerford and Wigginton	St Andrew, Great Rollright; St Mary, Swerford; St Giles, Wigginton		Rector: John Acreman; SSM: Christopher Turner; SSM: Wendy Cunningham	2,959
Tew, Great (St Michael and All Angels) with Little (St John the Evangelist) and Heythrop	St Michael & All Angels, Great Tew; St John the Evangelist, Little Tew; St Nicholas, Heythrop		Vicar: Ginny Thomas	383
Wychwood, Comprising Fifield with Idbury, Milton-Under-Wychwood, and Shipton-Under-Wychwood	St John the Baptist, Fifield; St Nicholas, Idbury; SS Simon & Jude, Milton-under-Wychwood; St Mary, Shipton-under-Wychwood		Vicar: Vacant	3,353

=== Deanery of Deddington ===
Benefice	Churches	Link	Clergy	Population served
Adderbury (St Mary) with Milton	St Mary, Adderbury; St John the Evangelist, Milton		Vicar: Stephen Fletcher	3,006
Banbury (St Francis)	St Francis, Banbury		Vicar: Chris Gaynor	10,586
Banbury (St Hugh)	St Hugh, Banbury		Vicar: Anita Smith; SSM: Colin Smith	6,389
Banbury (St Leonard)	St Leonard, Banbury		Vicar: Sue Burchell	8,662
Banbury (St Mary)	St Mary, Banbury		Rector: Philip Cochrane; SSM: Jeffrey West; SSM: Louise Adey Huish	7,389
Banbury (St Paul)	St Paul, Banbury		Vicar: Daniel McGowan; Curate: Richard Power	13,145
Bloxham (Our Lady of Bloxham) with Milcombe and South Newington	Our Lady of Bloxham, Bloxham; St Laurence, Milcombe; St Peter ad Vincula, South Newington		Vicar: Dale Gingrich	4,262
Bodicote (St John the Baptist)	St John the Baptist, Bodicote		Vicar: Sarah Sharp	2,346
Deddington (St Peter and St Paul) Barford, Clifton and Hempton	SS Peter & Paul, Deddington		Vicar: Annie Goldthorp; SSM: Paula Smith	2,702
Deddington (St Peter and St Paul) Barford, Clifton and Hempton	St John, Barford St John; St Michael, Barford St Michael; St John the Evangelist, Hempton		Vicar: Annie Goldthorp; SSM: Paula Smith	2,702
Ironstone: Drayton, Hanwell, Horley, Hornton, Shenington with Alkerton, and Wroxton with Balscote	St Peter, Drayton; St Peter, Hanwell; St Etheldreda, Horley; St John the Baptist, Hornton; St Michael & All Angels, Alkerton; Holy Trinity, Shenington; St Mary Magdalene, Balscote; All Saints, Wroxton		Rector: John Reader; Curate: Hugo White	2,144
Shires' Edge, Claydon, Cropredy, Great Bourton, Mollington, and Wardington	St Mary the Virgin, Cropredy		Vicar: Hilary Campbell	2,735
Shires' Edge, Claydon, Cropredy, Great Bourton, Mollington, and Wardington	St James the Great, Claydon; All Saints, Great Bourton; All Saints, Mollington; St Mary Magdalene, Wardington		Vicar: Hilary Campbell	2,735
Wykeham: Broughton with North Newington, Epwell with Sibford, Shutford, Swalcliffe, and Tadmarton	St Mary the Virgin, Broughton; St Anne, Epwell; St Martin, Shutford; Holy Trinity, Sibford; SS Peter & Paul, Swalcliffe; St Nicholas, Tadmarton		Rector: Ronald Hawkes; SSM: John Tattersall; SSM: Liz Hawkes	3,139

=== Deanery of Henley ===
Benefice	Churches	Link	Clergy	Population served
Goring (St Thomas of Canterbury) and Streatley With South Stoke	St Thomas of Canterbury, Goring; St Andrew, South Stoke; St Mary, Streatley		Vicar: Vacant; Curate: Steve Johnson; Curate: Wendy Middleton; SSM: Elizabeth Dowding	5,387
Henley-On-Thames (Holy Trinity)	Holy Trinity, Henley-on-Thames		Vicar: Duncan Carter; Minister (T@4): Sam Brewster (see below)	7,099
Henley-On-Thames (Holy Trinity)	Trinity at Four, Henley		Vicar: Duncan Carter; Minister (T@4): Sam Brewster (see below)	7,099
Henley-On-Thames (St Mary the Virgin) with Remenham	St Mary the Virgin, Henley-on-Thames; St Nicholas, Remenham		Rector: Vacant	4,204
Langtree, Comprising Checkendon, Ipsden, North Stoke, Stoke Row, Whitchurch, and Woodcote	SS Peter & Paul, Checkendon; St Mary the Virgin, Ipsden; St Mary the Virgin, North Stoke; St John the Evangelist, Stoke Row; St Mary the Virgin, Whitchurch; St John the Baptist, Whitchurch Hill; St Leonard, Woodcote		Team Rector: Kevin Davies; Team Vicar: Linda Smith; SSM: Angela Linton; SSM: Claire Alcock; Hon. Curate: Alan Gates	6,099
Nettlebed (St Bartholomew) with Bix, Highmoor, Pishill and Rotherfield Greys	St Bartholomew, Nettlebed; St James, Bix; Pishill Parish Church; St Nicholas, Rotherfield Greys		Rector/Priest-in-Charge: Brendan Bailey; Hon. Curate: Brian Shenton	3,350
Nuffield (Holy Trinity)	Holy Trinity, Nuffield		Rector/Priest-in-Charge: Brendan Bailey; Hon. Curate: Brian Shenton	3,350
Rotherfield Peppard (All Saints) and Kidmore End and Sonning Common	All Saints, Rotherfield Peppard		Rector: James Stickings; Curate: Stewart Morgan; SSM: Sheila Walker	6,640
Rotherfield Peppard (All Saints) and Kidmore End and Sonning Common	St John the Baptist, Kidmore End; Christ the King, Sonning Common		Rector: James Stickings; Curate: Stewart Morgan; SSM: Sheila Walker	6,640
Shiplake (St Peter and St Paul) with Dunsden and Harpsden	SS Peter & Paul, Shiplake; St Margaret, Harpsden; All Saints, Dunsden		Rector: Robert Thewsey	3,907

=== Deanery of Vale of White Horse ===
Benefice	Churches	Link	Clergy	Population served
Cherbury with Gainfield, Including Buckland, Charney Bassett, Hinton Waldrist, Littleworth, Longworth, Lyford, and Pusey	St Peter, Charney Bassett; St Mary the Virgin, Buckland; Holy Ascension, Littleworth; All Saints, Pusey; St Margaret, Hinton Waldrist; St Mary, Longworth; St Mary, Lyford		Rector: Talisker Tracey-MacLeod	2,138
Coxwell, Great (St Giles) with Buscot, Coleshill and Eaton Hastings	St Giles, Great Coxwell; St Mary, Buscot; All Saints, Coleshill; St Michael & All Angels, Eaton Hastings		Vicar: David Williams	681
Faringdon, Great (All Saints) with Little Coxwell	All Saints, Faringdon; St Mary, Little Coxwell		Vicar: Stephen Bellamy	7,275
Shrivenham (St Andrew) and Ashbury	St Andrew, Shrivenham; St Mary the Virgin, Ashbury; St Swithun, Compton Beauchamp; St John the Evangelist, Fernham; St Mary the Virgin, Longcot; St James, Bourton; St Thomas's Chapel, Watchfield		Vicar: Richard Hancock; SSM: Norma Fergusson	5,806
Stanford in the Vale (St Denys) with Goosey and Hatford	St Denys, Stanford in the Vale; All Saints, Goosey; St George, Hatford		Vicar: Paul Eddy	2,384
Uffington (St Mary), Shellingford, Woolstone and Baulking	St Mary, Uffington; St Nicholas, Baulking; St Faith, Shellingford; All Saints, Woolstone		Rector: Jeremy Goulston	1,210

=== Deanery of Wallingford ===
Benefice	Churches	Link	Clergy	Population served
Cholsey (St Mary) and Moulsford	St Mary, Cholsey		Vicar: Reverend Rebecca Peters; Curate Reverend Martyn Thorne	4,058
Cholsey (St Mary) and Moulsford	St John the Baptist, Moulsford		Vicar: Reverend Rebecca Peters; Curate Reverend Martyn Thorne	4,058
Churn, the (Aston Tirrold with Aston Upthorpe, Blewbury, Hagbourne, North Moreton, South Moreton, and Upton)	St Michael, Aston Tirrold; All Saints, Aston Upthorpe; St Michael & All Angels, Blewbury; St Andrew, Hagbourne; All Saints, North Moreton; St John the Baptist, South Moreton; St Mary the Virgin, Upton		Rector: Jason St John Nicolle; Curate: Jennifer Brown; OLM: Louise Butler; Hon. Curate: John Clarke	5,590
Didcot (All Saints)	All Saints, Didcot		Priest-in-Charge: Karen Beck; Curate: Hugh Boorman	13,522
Didcot (All Saints)	Ladygrove Church, Didcot (LEP)		Priest-in-Charge: Karen Beck; Curate: Hugh Boorman	13,522
Didcot (All Saints)	Great Western Park Church, Didcot (Conventional District)		Associate Minister: Mark Bodeker	8,378
Didcot (St Peter)	St Peter, Didcot		Priest-in-Charge: Hannah Reynolds; OLM: Fran Childs	10,746
Harwell (St Matthew) with Chilton	St Matthew, Harwell; All Saints, Chilton		Rector: Jonathan Mobey; SSM: Jan Radford; OLM: Pam Rolls	3,243
Wallingford (St Mary Le More with All Hallows) (St Leonard)	St Mary-le-More, Wallingford; St Leonard, Wallingford; St Agatha, Brightwell; St James, Sotwell; St Mary Magdalene, Crowmarsh Gifford		Team Rector: David Rice; Team Vicar: Kevin Beer; Hon. Curate: Jim Spence	10,341

=== Deanery of Wantage ===
Deanery website

Benefice	Churches	Link	Clergy	Population served
Ridgeway, Comprising Childrey with West Challow, Letcombe Bassett, Letcombe Regis, and Sparsholt with Kingston Lisle	St Laurence, West Challow; St Mary the Virgin, Childrey; St Michael & All Angels, Letcombe Bassett; St Andrew, Letcombe Regis; St John the Baptist, Kingston Lisle; Holy Cross, Sparsholt		Rector: Ness Brunner Ellis	2,001
Vale, Comprising Challow, Denchworth, Grove, and Hanney	St John the Baptist, Grove		Vicar: John Durant; Curate: Alec Gill; SSM: Paul Gooding; SSM: George Moody	9,343
Vale, Comprising Challow, Denchworth, Grove, and Hanney	St Nicolas, East Challow; St James, Denchworth; St James the Great, West Hanney		Vicar: John Durant; Curate: Alec Gill; SSM: Paul Gooding; SSM: George Moody	9,343
Wantage (St Peter and St Paul)	SS Peter & Paul, Wantage; Holy Trinity, Charlton		Vicar: Katherine Price; Curate: Benji Tyler	11,396
Wantage Downs, Comprising Ardington with Lockinge, East Hendred, and West Hendred	Holy Trinity, Ardington; All Saints, Lockinge; St Augustine of Canterbury, East Hendred; Holy Trinity, West Hendred		Rector: Nikolaj Christensen; SSM: Dorothy Page	1,945

=== Deanery of Witney ===
Benefice	Churches	Link	Clergy	Population served
Bampton (Holy Trinity) (St James) (St Mary) with Clanfield	St Mary, Bampton		Vicar: Vacant; SSM: Theresa Kuin Lawton	4,935
Bampton (Holy Trinity) (St James) (St Mary) with Clanfield	St James, Bampton Aston; Holy Trinity, Bampton Lew; St Stephen, Clanfield; St Mary, Shifford		Vicar: Vacant; SSM: Theresa Kuin Lawton	4,935
Brize Norton (St Britius) and Carterton	St John the Evangelist, Carterton		Team Rector: Barry Hanson; Team Vicar: Vacant; LLM: Lyndsay Baker	16,697
Brize Norton (St Britius) and Carterton	St Britius, Brize Norton		Team Rector: Barry Hanson; Team Vicar: Vacant; LLM: Lyndsay Baker	16,697
Burford (St John the Baptist) with Fulbrook, Taynton, Asthall, Swinbrook and Widford	St John the Baptist, Burford; St Nicholas, Asthall; St Mary, Swinbrook; St Oswald, Widford; St James the Great, Fulbrook; St John the Evangelist, Taynton		Vicar: Richard Coombs; SSM: Robert Wainwright; OLM: Cedric Reavley	2,227
Cogges (St Mary) and South Leigh	St Mary, Cogges		Vicar (Cogges): Simon Kirby; Curate (Cogges): Richard White; Curate/Vicar: Margaret Dixon; SSM: Nick Pike	9,513
Cogges (St Mary) and South Leigh	St James the Great, South Leigh		Vicar (Cogges): Simon Kirby; Curate (Cogges): Richard White; Curate/Vicar: Margaret Dixon; SSM: Nick Pike	9,513
Leigh, North (St Mary)	St Mary, North Leigh		Vicar (Cogges): Simon Kirby; Curate (Cogges): Richard White; Curate/Vicar: Margaret Dixon; SSM: Nick Pike	9,513
Ducklington (St Bartholomew)	St Bartholomew, Ducklington		Rector: Paul Boddam-Whetham	1,686
Shill Valley and Broadshire, Comprising Alvescot, Black Bourton, Broadwell with Kelmscott, Broughton Poggs with Filkins, Holwell, Kencot, Langford, Little Faringdon, Shilton, and Westwell	St Peter, Alvescot; St Mary the Virgin, Black Bourton; SS Peter & Paul, Broadwell; St George, Kelmscott; St Peter, Broughton Poggs; St Peter, Filkins; St Mary the Virgin, Holwell; St George, Kencot; St Matthew, Langford; St Margaret of England, Little Faringdon; Holy Rood, Shilton; St Mary, Westwell		Rector: Harry MacInnes; SSM: Karen Young	2,654
Windrush, Lower, Comprising Northmoor, Standlake, Stanton Harcourt, and Yelford	St Denys, Northmoor; St Giles, Standlake; St Michael, Stanton Harcourt; SS Nicholas & Swithun, Yelford		Rector: Drew Tweedy	2,689
Witney (St Mary the Virgin) (Holy Trinity)	St Mary the Virgin, Witney; Holy Trinity, Witney; St John the Baptist, Curbridge; St John the Evangelist, Hailey		Team Rector: Toby Wright; Team Vicar: Vanessa Whiffin; Curate: Joy Hance; Curate: Ross Meikle; SSM: Joanna McGrath; Hon. Curate: Sally Wright; Hon. Curate: Mark Thomas	23,483
Witney (St Mary the Virgin) (Holy Trinity)	St Kenelm, Minster Lovell		Team Rector: Toby Wright; Team Vicar: Vanessa Whiffin; Curate: Joy Hance; Curate: Ross Meikle; SSM: Joanna McGrath; Hon. Curate: Sally Wright; Hon. Curate: Mark Thomas	23,483

=== Deanery of Woodstock ===
Benefice	Churches	Link	Clergy	Population served
Eynsham (St Leonard) and Cassington	St Leonard, Eynsham		Vicar: Duncan Fraser	5,404
Eynsham (St Leonard) and Cassington	St Peter, Cassington		Vicar: Duncan Fraser	5,404
Hanborough (St Peter and St Paul) and Freeland	SS Peter & Paul, Hanborough; Christ Church, Long Hanborough		Rector: Steve Stewart; Associate Rector: Mike Madden; Curate: Heather McCulloch	4,184
Hanborough (St Peter and St Paul) and Freeland	St Mary the Virgin, Freeland		Rector: Steve Stewart; Associate Rector: Mike Madden; Curate: Heather McCulloch	4,184
Steeple Aston (St Peter and St Paul) with North Aston and Tackley	SS Peter & Paul, Steeple Aston; St Mary the Virgin, North Aston; St Nicholas, Tackley		Rector: Harriet Orridge	2,210
Stonesfield (St James the Great) with Combe Longa	St James the Great, Stonesfield		Rector: Ralph Williamson	2,299
Stonesfield (St James the Great) with Combe Longa	St Laurence, Combe Longa		Rector: Ralph Williamson	2,299
Westcote Barton (St Edward the Confessor) with Steeple Barton, Duns Tew and Sandford St Martin and Over with Nether Worton	St Edward the Confessor, Westcote Barton; St Mary Magdalene, Duns Tew; St James, Nether Worton; Holy Trinity, Over Worton; St Martin, Sandford St Martin; St Mary, Steeple Barton		Rector: Jane Wright	2,453
Woodstock (St Mary Magdalene) and Bladon	St Mary Magdalene, Woodstock; St Martin, Bladon		Rector: Jeremy Auld; Associate Minister: Shaun Henson; Hon. Associate Priest: Stephen Pix; Associate Priest: Andrew Burch; Associate Priest: Katie Jones	3,999
Yarnton (St Batholomew) with Begbroke and Shipton-On-Cherwell	St Bartholomew, Yarnton; St Michael, Begbroke; Holy Cross, Shipton-on-Cherwell		Rector: Oliver Petter	4,118
Wootton (St Mary) with Glympton and Kiddington	St Mary, Wootton; St Mary, Glympton; St Nicholas, Kiddington		Vicar: Vacant	737

=== Deanery of Amersham ===
Deanery website

Benefice	Churches	Link	Clergy	Population served
Amersham (St Mary the Virgin)	St Mary the Virgin, Amersham		Rector: Tim Harper; SSM: Sue Gill; OLM: Tim Barnard	7,898
Amersham (St Mary the Virgin)	All Saints, Coleshill		Rector: Tim Harper; SSM: Sue Gill; OLM: Tim Barnard	7,898
Amersham On the Hill (St Michael and All Angels)	St Michael & All Angels, Amersham-on-the-Hill		Vicar: Debbie Oades; SSM: Peter Binns; OLM: Sharon Roberts	7,086
Beaconsfield (St Mary and All Saints) (St Michael and All Angels)	St Mary & All Saints, Beaconsfield		Team Rector: Sharon Roberts; Team Vicar: Lucy Fyfe-Jamieson; Team Vicar: Michael Johnson; Associate Priest: Margot Suter	11,862
Beaconsfield (St Mary and All Saints) (St Michael and All Angels)	St Michael & All Angels, Beaconsfield		Team Rector: Sharon Roberts; Team Vicar: Lucy Fyfe-Jamieson; Team Vicar: Michael Johnson; Associate Priest: Margot Suter	11,862
Beaconsfield (St Mary and All Saints) (St Michael and All Angels)	St Thomas, Holtspur		Team Rector: Sharon Roberts; Team Vicar: Lucy Fyfe-Jamieson; Team Vicar: Michael Johnson; Associate Priest: Margot Suter	11,862
Chalfont St Giles (St Giles), Seer Green and Jordans	St Giles, Chalfont St Giles		Rector: Ian Brown; Curate: Jenny Tebboth; Curate: Paul Henderson; Curate: Cassa Messervy; SSM: Melvyn Bleakley	9,290
Chalfont St Giles (St Giles), Seer Green and Jordans	Holy Trinity, Seer Green		Rector: Ian Brown; Curate: Jenny Tebboth; Curate: Paul Henderson; Curate: Cassa Messervy; SSM: Melvyn Bleakley	9,290
Chalfont St Peter (St Peter)	St Peter, Chalfont St Peter; St Paul, Horn Hill; All Saints, Oval Way		Rector: John Goodman; OLM: Wendy Graham	12,889
Chenies (St Michael) and Little Chalfont, Latimer and Flaunden	St Michael, Chenies; St George, Little Chalfont; St Mary Magdalene, Flaunden; St Mary Magdalene, Latimer		Rector: Vacant; SSM: Ruth Boughton; Hon. Curate: John Went	6,506
Chesham Bois (St Leonard)	St Leonard, Chesham Bois		Rector: Laurie Clow; SSM: Christopher Clare	4,094
Chesham, Great (Christ Church) (Emmanuel) (St Mary the Virgin)	Christ Church, Waterside; Emmanuel, Chesham; St Mary the Virgin, Chesham; St John the Evangelist, Ashley Green; St John the Evangelist, Bellingdon; St George, Tyler's Hill		Team Rector: Simon Cansdale; Team Vicar: John Shepherd; Team Vicar: Sylvester Liyanage; Curate: Christopher Gercke; SSM: Tim Yates	23,817
Denham (St Mark) (St Mary the Virgin)	St Mary the Virgin, Denham; St Mark, Denham Green; St Francis, New Denham		Rector: Christoph Lindner	7,394
Gerrards Cross (St James) and Fulmer	St James, Gerrards Cross; St James, Fulmer		Rector: Martin Williams; Curate: James Leach; Curate: Christopher Lion; Curate: Ben Topham; SSM: Meyrick Beebee; SSM: Jill Roth	8,312
Penn (Holy Trinity) and Tylers Green	Holy Trinity, Penn; St Margaret, Tylers Green		Vicar: Mike Bisset; Curate: Graham Summers	8,592
Penn Street (Holy Trinity)	Holy Trinity, Penn Street; Christ Church, Holmer Green		Vicar: Peter Simmons	3,962
Latimer Minster	Latimer Minster (2010)		SSM: Frog Orr-Ewing	N/A

=== Deanery of Aylesbury ===
Benefice	Churches	Link	Clergy	Population served
Aylesbury (St Mary the Virgin)	St Mary the Virgin, Aylesbury		Team Rector: Doug Zimmerman; Team Vicar: Gareth Lane; Curate: Peter Wheeler	26,467
Aylesbury (St Mary the Virgin)	St Peter, Aylesbury		Team Rector: Doug Zimmerman; Team Vicar: Gareth Lane; Curate: Peter Wheeler	26,467
Aylesbury (St Mary the Virgin)	Fairford Leys Church (LEP)		Team Rector: Doug Zimmerman; Team Vicar: Gareth Lane; Curate: Peter Wheeler	26,467
Bedgrove (Holy Spirit)	Holy Spirit, Bedgrove		Vicar: Martin Kuhrt	7,674
Bernwode, Comprising Ashendon, Boarstall, Brill, Chilton, Dorton, Ludgershall, and Wotton Underwood	St Mary, Ashendon; St James, Boarstall; All Saints, Brill; St Mary, Chilton; St John the Baptist, Dorton; St Mary the Virgin, Ludgershall; All Saints, Wotton Underwood		Rector: Gemma Beesley; Curate: Jenny Edmans	2,780
Bierton (St James the Great) and Hulcott	St James the Great, Bierton; All Saints, Hulcott		Vicar: Mark Ackford	9,185
Broughton (KBC)	Kingsbrook & Broughton Church (KBC)		Vicar: <vacant>	3,609
Long Crendon (St Mary the Virgin) with Chearsley and Nether Winchendon	St Mary the Virgin, Long Crendon; St Nicholas, Chearsley; St Nicholas, Nether Winchendon		Vicar: Richard Phillips	3,167
Risborough, Comprising Bledlow with Saunderton and Horsenden, Lacey Green, Monks Risborough, and Princes Risborough with Ilmer	Holy Trinity, Bledlow; St Michael & All Angels, Horsenden; SS Mary & Nicholas, Saunderton		Team Rector: David Williams; Team Vicar: James Tomkins; Team Vicar: Tony Bundock; Curate: Dan Beesley; SSM: Michael Hunt	13,619
Risborough, Comprising Bledlow with Saunderton and Horsenden, Lacey Green, Monks Risborough, and Princes Risborough with Ilmer	St John the Evangelist, Lacey Green		Team Rector: David Williams; Team Vicar: James Tomkins; Team Vicar: Tony Bundock; Curate: Dan Beesley; SSM: Michael Hunt	13,619
Risborough, Comprising Bledlow with Saunderton and Horsenden, Lacey Green, Monks Risborough, and Princes Risborough with Ilmer	St Dunstan, Monks Risborough; Owlswick Chapel		Team Rector: David Williams; Team Vicar: James Tomkins; Team Vicar: Tony Bundock; Curate: Dan Beesley; SSM: Michael Hunt	13,619
Risborough, Comprising Bledlow with Saunderton and Horsenden, Lacey Green, Monks Risborough, and Princes Risborough with Ilmer	St Peter, Ilmer; St Mary, Princes Risborough		Team Rector: David Williams; Team Vicar: James Tomkins; Team Vicar: Tony Bundock; Curate: Dan Beesley; SSM: Michael Hunt	13,619
Southcourt (Good Shepherd)	Good Shepherd, Southcourt		Vicar: Colin Hartley	15,337
Walton (Holy Trinity)	Holy Trinity, Aylesbury		Vicar: Vacant	11,041
Worminghall (St Peter and St Paul) with Ickford, Oakley and Shabbington	SS Peter & Paul, Worminghall; St Nicholas, Ickford; St Mary, Oakley; St Mary Magdalene, Shabbington		Rector: David Kaboleh	2,533
Wychert Vale, Comprising Aston Sandford, Cuddington, Haddenham, Kingsey, and Stone with Dinton and Hartwell	St Michael & All Angels, Aston Sandford; St Nicholas, Cuddington; St Mary the Virgin, Haddenham; St Nicholas, Kingsey; SS Peter & Paul, Dinton; St John the Baptist, Stone		Rector: Margot Hodson; Curate: Phil Groves; Curate: Nadine Rose; SSM: Jon Hawkins; OLM: Nigel Featherston	8,957

=== Deanery of Buckingham ===
Deanery website

Benefice	Churches	Link	Clergy	Population served
Buckingham (St Peter and St Paul)	SS Peter & Paul, Buckingham		Rector: Will Pearson-Gee; Curate: Alexandra Walsh; Curate: Danny Rodgers; SSM: John King	13,229
Buckingham (St Peter and St Paul)	Assumption of the Blessed Virgin Mary, Beachampton; St John the Evangelist, Radclive; St Mary, Thornborough; All Saints, Nash; St Mary, Whaddon		Rector: Will Pearson-Gee; Curate: Alexandra Walsh; Curate: Danny Rodgers; SSM: John King	13,229
Buckingham, North, Comprising Akeley, Leckhampstead, Lillingstone Dayrell, Lillingstone Lovell, and Maids Moreton	St James, Akeley; Assumption of the Blessed Virgin Mary, Leckhampstead; St Nicholas, Lillingstone Dayrell; Assumption of the Blessed Virgin Mary, Lillingstone Lovell; St Edmund, Maids Moreton		Rector: Johannes Taling	2,824
Buckingham, West, Comprising Biddlesden, Shalstone, Tingewick, Turweston, Water Stratford, and Westbury	St Margaret of Scotland, Biddlesden; St Edward the Confessor, Shalstone; St Mary Magdalene, Tingewick; Assumption of the Blessed Virgin Mary, Turweston; St Giles, Water Stratford; St Augustine of Canterbury, Westbury		Rector: Elizabeth Simpson	2,071
Lenborough, Comprising Adstock, Gawcott, Hillesden, and Padbury	St Mary the Virgin, Padbury		Vicar: Ros Roberts	2,161
Lenborough, Comprising Adstock, Gawcott, Hillesden, and Padbury	St Cecilia, Adstock; Holy Trinity, Gawcott; All Saints, Hillesden		Vicar: Ros Roberts	2,161
Stowe (Assumption of St Mary the Virgin)	Assumption of St Mary the Virgin, Stowe		Hon. Priest-in-Charge: Vacant	929

=== Deanery of Burnham and Slough ===
Benefice	Churches	Link	Clergy	Population served
Britwell (St George)	St George, Britwell (1950s)		Vicar: Neil McCathie; Curate: Jason Griffiths	12,359
Burnham (St Peter)	St Peter, Burnham		Vicar: Bill Jackson	12,990
Cippenham (St Andrew)	St Andrew, Cippenham		Vicar: Janet Minkkinen	19,297
Colnbrook (St Thomas) and Datchet	St Thomas, Colnbrook; St Mary the Virgin, Datchet		Vicar: Vacant; Curate: Rod Cosh	11,164
Eton (St John the Evangelist) with Eton Wick, Boveney and Dorney	St John the Evangelist, Eton; St John the Baptist, Eton Wick; St James the Less, Dorney		Vicar: Rosalind Stacey	5,540
Farnham Royal (St Mary the Virgin) with Hedgerley	St Mary the Virgin, Farnham Royal; St John the Evangelist, Farnham Common; St Mary the Virgin, Hedgerley		Rector: Graham Saunders	9,894
Hitcham (St Mary)	St Mary, Hitcham		Vicar: Sue Sampson	1,935
Horton (St Michael and All Angels) and Wraysbury	St Michael & All Angels, Horton		Vicar: Colin Gibson; Curate: Jose Fernandes	4,714
Horton (St Michael and All Angels) and Wraysbury	St Andrew, Wraysbury		Vicar: Colin Gibson; Curate: Jose Fernandes	4,714
Iver (St Peter)	St Peter, Iver; St Leonard, Richings Park		Vicar: Robert Gooding	6,168
Iver Heath (St Margaret)	St Margaret, Iver Heath		Rector: Andrew Montgomerie	5,156
Langley Marish (St Mary the Virgin)	St Mary the Virgin, Langley; St Francis of Assisi, Castle View Estate; Christ the Worker, Parlaunt Road (1965)		Team Rector: Robin Grayson; Team Vicar: Shola Aoko; Curate: Sue Lepp	29,046
Manor Park (St John the Baptist) and Whitby Road	St John the Baptist, Manor Park; St Michael, Whitby Road		Vicar: George Howard	18,569
Slough (St Paul) (Christ Church)	St Paul, Slough		Vicar: Michael Cotterell	18,187
Stoke Poges (St Giles)	St Giles, Stoke Poges; St Andrew's Chapel, Stoke Poges		Vicar: Vacant; SSM: Andrew Parry	4,981
Taplow (St Nicolas) and Dropmore	St Nicolas, Taplow; St Anne, Dropmore		Vicar: Jane Cresswell	1,570
Upton Cum Chalvey (St Mary)	St Mary, Upton		Team Rector: Andrew Allen; Team Vicar: Alistair Stewart; SSM: Linda Hillier	25,039
Upton Cum Chalvey (St Mary)	St Laurence, Upton		Team Rector: Andrew Allen; Team Vicar: Alistair Stewart; SSM: Linda Hillier	25,039
Upton Cum Chalvey (St Mary)	St Peter, Chalvey		Team Rector: Andrew Allen; Team Vicar: Alistair Stewart; SSM: Linda Hillier	25,039
Wexham (St Mary)	St Mary, Wexham		Hon. Priest-in-Charge: Mary Kent	7,026

=== Deanery of Claydon ===
Benefice	Churches	Link	Clergy	Population served
Claydons, the (St Mary) (All Saints) and Swan	St Mary, East Claydon; All Saints, Middle Claydon; St Michael, Steeple Claydon		Team Rector: David Hiscock; Team Vicar: Vacant; SSM: Angela Mann	8,016
Claydons, the (St Mary) (All Saints) and Swan	St James, Barton Hartshorn; SS Mary & Nicholas, Chetwode; St Michael, Edgcott; St Leonard, Grendon Underwood; St Mary the Virgin, Marsh Gibbon; St John the Baptist, Preston Bissett; Assumption of the Blessed Virgin Mary, Twyford		Team Rector: David Hiscock; Team Vicar: Vacant; SSM: Angela Mann	8,016
Schorne, Comprising Dunton, Granborough, Hardwick, Hoggeston, North Marston, Oving with Pitchcott, Quainton, Waddesdon, Westcott, Over Winchendon and Fleet Marston, and Whitchurch with Creslow	St Martin, Dunford; St John the Baptist, Granborough; St Mary the Virgin, Hardwicke; Weedon Old School Chapel; Holy Cross, Hoggeston; Assumption of the Blessed Virgin Mary, North Marston; All Saints, Oving; Holy Cross & St Mary, Quainton; St Michael & All Angels, Waddesdon; St Mary, Westcott; St Mary Magdalene, Over Winchendon; St John the Evangelist, Whitchurch		Team Rector: David Meakin; Team Vicar: Mary Cruddas; Curate: Jacqueline Dove; SSM: Steve Flashman	7,519
Winslow (St Laurence) with Great Horwood and Addington	St Laurence, Winslow; St Mary, Addington; St James, Great Horwood		Rector: Richard Lightbown	5,590

=== Deanery of Milton Keynes ===
Benefice	Churches	Link	Clergy	Population served
Bletchley (St Mary) (St John's District Church)	St Mary, Bletchley		Rector: David McDougall; Curate: Matt Beer; Curate: Ben Thorpe; OLM: Sam Muthuveloe	22,623
Bletchley, North (Whaddon Way Church) Conventional District	Whaddon Way Church (LEP)		Minister (Baptist): ???	22,623
Fenny Stratford (St Martin)	St Martin, Fenny Stratford		Vicar: Victor Bullock; SSM: Ian Thomas	6,489
Milton Keynes (Christ the Cornerstone)	Christ the Cornerstone, Milton Keynes (LEP)		Vicar: Ernesto Lozada-Uzuriaga; Curate: Tim Norwood; SSM: Keith Straughan; SSM: Paul Oxley	3,483
Stantonbury (Christ Church) and Willen	Christ Church, Stantonbury (LEP); St Lawrence, Bradwell (LEP); St James, New Bradwell (LEP); Cross and Stable, Downs Barn (LEP); St Andrew, Great Linford; St Mary Magdalene, Willen (LEP)		Team Rector: Paul Smith; Team Vicar: Vacant; SSM: Chukwuemeka Iwuagwu	43,637
Stony Stratford (St Mary and St Giles) with Calverton	SS Mary & Giles, Stony Stratford; All Saints, Calverton		Rector: Ross Northing; SSM: Tunji Adebiyi	7,933
Walton, Milton Keynes. Comprising Milton Keynes Village and Wavendon	All Saints, Milton Keynes Village (LEP); Assumption of the Blessed Virgin Mary, Wavendon; Christ the King, Kents Hill (LEP); Church Without Walls, Milton Keynes (LEP)		Rector: Matthew Trendall	29,711
Water Eaton (St Frideswide)	St Frideswide, Water Eaton		Priest-in-Charge: Catherine Butt	8,416
Watling Valley, Milton Keynes (Not Known)	Servant King, Furzton; All Saints, Loughton; St Mary, Shenley Church End; St Giles, Tattenhoe; Holy Cross, Two Mile Ash		Team Rector: Mike Morris; Team Vicar: Sharon Grenham-Thompson; SSM: Dayo Adebiyi	49,371
Wolverton (Holy Trinity) (St George the Martyr)	Holy Trinity, Wolverton; St George the Martyr, Wolverton		Rector: Gillian Barrow-Jones; Curate: Ann Kember	12,480
Woughton. Comprising Fishermead, Simpson, Woolstone, and Woughton-On-The-Green	Trinity Church Fishermead; St Thomas, Simpson; Holy Trinity, Woolstone; St Mary, Woughton-on-the-Green; Christ the Vine Community Church, Coffee Hall		Rector: Ian Herbert; OLM: Paul Norris	29,161

=== Deanery of Mursley ===
Benefice	Churches	Link	Clergy	Population served
Brickhills and Stoke Hammond, The	All Saints, Bow Brickhill; St Mary the Virgin, Great Brickhill; St Mary Magdalene, Little Brickhill; St Luke, Stoke Hammond		Rector: John Waller	2,753
Cottesloe, Comprising Aston Abbots, Cheddington with Mentmore, Cublington, Soulbury, Stewkley, Wing with Grove, and Wingrave	St James the Great, Aston Abbots; St Giles, Cheddington; St Mary the Virgin, Mentmore; St Nicholas, Cublington; All Saints, Soulbury; St Michael & All Angels, Stewkley; All Saints, Wing with Grove; SS Peter & Paul, Wingrave		Team Rector: Phil Derbyshire; Team Vicar: Helen Barnes; OLM: Siv Tunnicliffe; Hon. Curate: Peter Lymbery	9,625
Ivinghoe (St Mary the Virgin) with Pitstone and Slapton and Marsworth	St Mary the Virgin, Ivinghoe		Vicar: Adrian Manning	5,144
Ivinghoe (St Mary the Virgin) with Pitstone and Slapton and Marsworth	All Saints, Marsworth		Vicar: Adrian Manning	5,144
Ivinghoe (St Mary the Virgin) with Pitstone and Slapton and Marsworth	Holy Cross, Slapton		Vicar: Adrian Manning	5,144
Newton Longville (St Faith), Mursley, Swanbourne, Little Horwood and Drayton Parslow	Holy Trinity, Drayton Parslow; St Nicholas, Little Horwood; St Mary the Virgin, Mursley; St Faith, Newton Longville; St Swithun, Swanbourne		Vicar: Simon Faulks; SSM: David Talks; OLM: Jacqueline Brown	3,922

=== Deanery of Newport ===
Benefice	Churches	Link	Clergy	Population served
Gayhurst (St Peter) with Ravenstone, Stoke Goldington and Weston Underwood	St Peter, Gayhurst; All Saints, Ravenstone; St Peter, Stoke Goldington; St Laurence, Weston Underwood		Rector: Christina Pumfrey	2,899
Lavendon (St Michael) with Cold Brayfield, Clifton Reynes and Newton Blossomville	St Michael, Lavendon; St Mary the Virgin, Clifton Reynes; St Mary, Cold Brayfield; St Nicolas, Newton Blossomville		Rector: Christina Pumfrey	2,899
Hanslope (St James the Great) with Castlethorpe	St James the Great, Hanslope; SS Simon & Jude, Castlethorpe		Vicar: Gary Ecclestone	3,375
Lamp, Comprising Emberton, Haversham with Little Linford, and Tyringham with Filgrave	All Saints, Emberton; St Mary, Haversham; St Leonard, Little Linford; St Peter, Tyringham		Rector: Richard Caddell; OLM: Harold Lowndes	1,712
Newport Pagnell (St Luke) with Lathbury and Moulsoe	St Luke, Newport Pagnell; All Saints, Lathbury; Assumption of the Blessed Virgin Mary, Moulsoe		Rector: Nick Evans	15,624
Olney (St Peter and St Paul)	SS Peter & Paul, Olney		Rector: Vacant	6,510
Sherington (St Laud) with Chicheley, North Crawley, Astwood and Hardmead	St Laud, Sherington; St Laurence, Chicheley; St Firmin, North Crawley		Priest-in-Charge: Coralie Mansfield	2,055

=== Deanery of Wendover ===
Benefice	Churches	Link	Clergy	Population served
Aston Clinton (St Michael and All Angels) with Buckland and Drayton Beauchamp	St Michael & All Angels, Aston Clinton		Rector: Sally Bottomer; OLM: Alison Roberts	4,498
Aston Clinton (St Michael and All Angels) with Buckland and Drayton Beauchamp	All Saints, Buckland		Rector: Sally Bottomer; OLM: Alison Roberts	4,498
Aston Clinton (St Michael and All Angels) with Buckland and Drayton Beauchamp	St Mary the Virgin, Drayton Beauchamp		Rector: Sally Bottomer; OLM: Alison Roberts	4,498
Ellesborough (St Peter and St Paul), the Kimbles and Stoke Mandeville	SS Peter & Paul, Ellesborough; Chapel of the Resurrection, Dunsmore; St Nicholas, Great Kimble; All Saints, Little Kimble; St Mary the Virgin, Stoke Mandeville		Rector: Vacant	3,874
Hawridge (St Mary) with Cholesbury and St Leonard	St Mary, Hawridge; St Lawrence, Cholesbury; St Leonard, St Leonards		Rector/Vicar: David Burgess	1,690
Lee, the (St John the Baptist)	St John the Baptist, The Lee		Rector/Vicar: David Burgess	1,690
Missenden, Great (St Peter and St Paul) with Ballinger and Little Hampden	SS Peter & Paul, Great Missenden; St Mary's Mission Hall, Ballinger; Little Hampden Church		Vicar: Malcolm Chalmers	4,124
Missenden, Little (St John the Baptist)	St John the Baptist, Little Missenden; St Andrew's Mission Church, Hyde Heath		Priest-in-Charge: John Simpson	2,690
Prestwood (Holy Trinity) and Great Hampden	Holy Trinity, Prestwood		Rector: Deiniol Kearley-Heywood; Hon. Curate: Teresia Derlén	6,987
Prestwood (Holy Trinity) and Great Hampden	St Mary Magdalene, Great Hampden		Rector: Deiniol Kearley-Heywood; Hon. Curate: Teresia Derlén	6,987
Wendover (St Mary) (St Agnes's Chapel) and Halton	St Mary, Wendover; St Michael & All Angels, Halton		Rector: Sally Moring	8,274
Weston Turville (St Mary the Virgin)	St Mary the Virgin, Weston Turville		Rector: David Wales; SSM: Susan Fellows	3,125

=== Deanery of Wycombe ===
Deanery website

Benefice	Churches	Link	Clergy	Population served
Flackwell Heath (Christ Church)	Christ Church, Flackwell Heath		Vicar: James Dwyer; Curate: Gill Taylor; LLM: Sue Simpson, Debbie Fox-Webb, Helen Broadbent	5,984
Hambleden Valley, Comprising Fawley, Fingest, Hambleden with Frieth, Medmenham, and Turville	St Mary the Virgin, Fawley; St Bartholomew, Fingest; St John the Baptist, Frieth; St Mary the Virgin, Hambleden; SS Peter & Paul, Medmenham; St Mary, Turville		Rector: Stephen Southgate; SSM: Sue Morton	3,152
Hazlemere (Holy Trinity)	Holy Trinity, Hazlemere; Good Shepherd, Widmer End		Vicar: Mark Meardon; Curate: Dominic Meering	11,196
Hedsor (St Nicholas) and Bourne End	St Nicholas, Hedsor; St Mark, Bourne End		Rector: Janet Binns	5,399
Hughenden (St Michael)	St Michael & All Angels, Hughenden		Vicar: Keith Johnson; SSM: Helen Peters	6,115
Lane End (Holy Trinity) with Cadmore End	Holy Trinity, Lane End		Vicar: Vacant	3,671
Lane End (Holy Trinity) with Cadmore End	St Mary le Moor, Cadmore End		Vicar: Vacant	3,671
Loudwater (St Peter)	St Peter, Loudwater		Vicar: Timothy Butlin	4,442
Marlow, Great (All Saints) with Marlow Bottom, Little Marlow and Bisham	All Saints, Great Marlow; All Saints, Bisham; St Mary the Virgin, Marlow Bottom; St John the Baptist, Little Marlow		Team Rector: Dave Bull; Team Vicar: Sarah Fitzgerald; Team Vicar: Samantha Watts; Team Vicar: Graham Watts; Curate: Roland Slade; SSM: Gabrielle Smith; SSM: John Smith	20,783
Stokenchurch (St Peter and St Paul) and Ibstone	SS Peter & Paul, Stokenchurch		Priest-in-Charge: Vacant	5,071
Stokenchurch (St Peter and St Paul) and Ibstone	St Nicholas, Ibstone		Priest-in-Charge: Vacant	5,071
Terriers (St Francis)	St Francis of Assisi, Terriers		Vicar: Vacant	7,512
Wooburn (St Paul)	St Paul, Wooburn; St Mary, Wycombe Lane		Vicar: Martin Wallington	5,601
Wycombe, High (All Saints) (St Andrew) (St Anne and St Peter) (Christ the Servant King) (St James) (St Mary and St George)	All Saints, High Wycombe		Team Rector: Hugh Ellis; Team Vicar: Simon Dust; Team Vicar: Christopher Owen; Team Vicar: Wendy Bull; SSM: Peter Viney; SSM: Heather Graham; OLM: Jackie Lock	67,383
Wycombe, High (All Saints) (St Andrew) (St Anne and St Peter) (Christ the Servant King) (St James) (St Mary and St George)	St James the Great, Downley		Team Rector: Hugh Ellis; Team Vicar: Simon Dust; Team Vicar: Christopher Owen; Team Vicar: Wendy Bull; SSM: Peter Viney; SSM: Heather Graham; OLM: Jackie Lock	67,383
Wycombe, High (All Saints) (St Andrew) (St Anne and St Peter) (Christ the Servant King) (St James) (St Mary and St George)	Christ the Servant King, Booker		Team Rector: Hugh Ellis; Team Vicar: Simon Dust; Team Vicar: Christopher Owen; Team Vicar: Wendy Bull; SSM: Peter Viney; SSM: Heather Graham; OLM: Jackie Lock	67,383
Wycombe, High (All Saints) (St Andrew) (St Anne and St Peter) (Christ the Servant King) (St James) (St Mary and St George)	St Andrew, Hatters Lane		Team Rector: Hugh Ellis; Team Vicar: Simon Dust; Team Vicar: Christopher Owen; Team Vicar: Wendy Bull; SSM: Peter Viney; SSM: Heather Graham; OLM: Jackie Lock	67,383
Wycombe, High (All Saints) (St Andrew) (St Anne and St Peter) (Christ the Servant King) (St James) (St Mary and St George)	St Anne, Wycombe Marsh; St Peter, Micklefield		Team Rector: Hugh Ellis; Team Vicar: Simon Dust; Team Vicar: Christopher Owen; Team Vicar: Wendy Bull; SSM: Peter Viney; SSM: Heather Graham; OLM: Jackie Lock	67,383
Wycombe, High (All Saints) (St Andrew) (St Anne and St Peter) (Christ the Servant King) (St James) (St Mary and St George)	SS Mary & George, Sands		Team Rector: Hugh Ellis; Team Vicar: Simon Dust; Team Vicar: Christopher Owen; Team Vicar: Wendy Bull; SSM: Peter Viney; SSM: Heather Graham; OLM: Jackie Lock	67,383
Wycombe, West (St Lawrence) (St Paul) with Bledlow Ridge, Bradenham and Radnage	St Lawrence, West Wycombe; St Paul, West Wycombe		Rector: Lance Sharpe	4,301
Wycombe, West (St Lawrence) (St Paul) with Bledlow Ridge, Bradenham and Radnage	St Paul, Bledlow Ridge; St Botolph, Bradenham; St Mary, Radnage		Rector: Lance Sharpe	4,301

=== Deanery of Bracknell ===
Benefice	Churches	Link	Clergy	Population served
Ascot Heath (All Saints)	All Saints, Ascot		Rector: Darrell Hannah	8,764
Binfield (All Saints) (St Mark)	All Saints, Binfield; St Mark, Binfield		Rector: Luke Taylor	7,229
Bracknell (Holy Trinity)	Holy Trinity, Bracknell			22,785
Warfield (St Michael the Archangel) (All Saints) (St Peter)	St Michael the Archangel, Warfield; Eternity Bullbrook; All Saints, Warfield School; St Peter, Whitegrove School; Woodhurst Church; St Andrew, Priestwood		Vicar: Catherine Morris; Curate: Nigel Richards	16,832
Easthampstead (St Michael and St Mary Magdalene)	SS Michael & Mary Magdalene, Easthampstead; SS Francis & Clare, Jennett's Park		Rector: Guy Cole; Curate: Emily Gent	28,637
Sunningdale (Holy Trinity)	Holy Trinity, Sunningdale		Vicar: Jon Hutchinson	5,366
Sunninghill (St Michael and All Angels) and South Ascot	St Michael & All Angels, Sunninghill; All Souls, South Ascot		Vicar: Stephen Johnson; SSM: Tracey Williams	8,846
Winkfield (St Mary the Virgin) and Cranbourne	St Mary the Virgin, Winkfield; St Martin, Chavey Down; St Peter, Cranbourne		Curate: Huw Mordecai	5,415

=== Deanery of Bradfield ===
Benefice	Churches	Link	Clergy	Population served
Aldermaston (St Mary the Virgin) and Woolhampton	St Mary the Virgin, Aldermaston; St Nicholas, Wasing; St Mary, Beenham Valence; St Peter, Brimpton; St Matthew, Midgham; St Peter, Woolhampton		Rector: Vacant; Curate: Janice Macdonald; SSM: Pat Bhutta	4,333
Basildon (St Stephen) with Aldworth and Ashampstead	St Stephen, Basildon; St Mary the Virgin, Aldworth; St Clement, Ashampstead		Vicar: Will Watts	2,065
Bradfield (St Andrew) and Stanford Dingley	St Peter, Bradfield Southend; St Denys, Stanford Dingley		Priest-in-Charge (Bucklebury): Julian Gadsby; SSM: Lyn Bliss	4,515
Bucklebury (St Mary) with Marlston	St Mary, Bucklebury; All Saints, Upper Bucklebury; St Mary, Marlston		Priest-in-Charge (Bucklebury): Julian Gadsby; SSM: Lyn Bliss	4,515
Burghfield (St Mary the Virgin)	St Mary the Virgin, Burghfield		Priest-in-Charge: Glynnis Lautenbach	5,975
Pangbourne (St James the Less) with Tidmarsh and Sulham	St James the Less, Pangbourne; St Nicholas, Sulham; St Laurence, Tidmarsh		Rector: Heather Parbury	3,764
Purley (St Mary the Virgin)	St Mary the Virgin, Purley		Rector: David Archer; OLM: Andrew Mackie	5,918
Stratfield Mortimer (St Mary) and Mortimer West End with Padworth	St Mary, Stratfield Mortimer; St Saviour, Mortimer West End; St John the Baptist, Padworth; St John the Evangelist, Mortimer Common		Vicar: Paul Chaplin	5,298
Sulhamstead Abbots (St Mary) and Bannister with Ufton Nervet	St Mary, Sulhamstead Abbots		Hon. Priest-in-Charge: John Paton	1,962
Theale (Holy Trinity) and Englefield	Holy Trinity, Theale		Priest-in-Charge: Ann Templeman; Curate: Peter Templeman; Hon. Curate: Nicholas Wynne-Jones	3,061
Theale (Holy Trinity) and Englefield	St Mark, Englefield		Priest-in-Charge: Ann Templeman; Curate: Peter Templeman; Hon. Curate: Nicholas Wynne-Jones	3,061

=== Deanery of Maidenhead and Windsor ===
Benefice	Churches	Link	Clergy	Population served
Boyne Hill (All Saints)	All Saints, Boyne Hill		Vicar: Jeremy Harris	14,713
Bray (St Michael) and Braywood	St Michael, Bray		Vicar: Vacant	10,395
Burchetts Green, Comprising Hurley, Littlewick, and Stubbings	St Mary the Virgin, Hurley; St John the Evangelist, Littlewick; St James the Less, Stubbings		Vicar: Keith Nicholls; SSM: Tina Molyneux	4,150
Clewer (St Andrew)	St Andrew, Clewer		Rector: Rosie Webb	7,152
Cookhams, the (Holy Trinity) (St John the Baptist)	Holy Trinity, Cookham		Vicar: Nick Plant; Curate: Helen Chamberlain; Curate: John Ainslie; SSM: David Joynes; OLM: Jo Ellington	7,749
Cookhams, the (Holy Trinity) (St John the Baptist)	St John the Baptist, Cookham Dean		Vicar: Nick Plant; Curate: Helen Chamberlain; Curate: John Ainslie; SSM: David Joynes; OLM: Jo Ellington	7,749
Cox Green (Good Shepherd)	Good Shepherd, Cox Green		Vicar: Joan Hicks	7,406
Dedworth (All Saints)	All Saints, Dedworth		Vicar: Louise Brown	11,422
Furze Platt (St Peter)	St Peter, Maidenhead; St Mark's Hospital Church, Maidenhead		Vicar: David Short	11,820
Maidenhead (St Andrew and St Mary Magdalene)	St Andrew & Mary Magdalene, Maidenhead		Vicar: Will Stileman; Associate Vicar: Jon Drake; Curate: Ian Miller; SSM: Dave Atallah; SSM: Neil Watkinson	2,648
Maidenhead (St Luke)	St Luke, Maidenhead		Vicar: Sally Lynch; Curate: Nicola Hulks; SSM: Teresa Robinson	11,567
Waltham St Lawrence (St Lawrence)	St Lawrence, Waltham St Lawrence		Hon. Priest-in-Charge: Charles Mason	1,216
White Waltham (St Mary the Virgin) with Shottesbrooke	St Mary the Virgin, White Waltham; St John the Baptist, Shottesbrooke		Priest-in-Charge: Dave Atallah	2,715
Windsor, New (Holy Trinity) (St John the Baptist with All Saints)	Holy Trinity, Windsor		Team Rector: Ainsley Swift; Curate: Kathryn Harrison; SSM: Tim Laundon	12,449
Windsor, New (Holy Trinity) (St John the Baptist with All Saints)	St John the Baptist, Windsor		Team Rector: Ainsley Swift; Curate: Kathryn Harrison; SSM: Tim Laundon	12,449
Windsor, New (Holy Trinity) (St John the Baptist with All Saints)	St Stephen, Clewer; St Agnes, Spital		Team Rector: Ainsley Swift; Curate: Kathryn Harrison; SSM: Tim Laundon	12,449
Windsor, Old (St Peter and St Andrew) (St Luke's Mission Room)	SS Peter & Andrew, Old Windsor; St Luke, Old Windsor		Vicar: Adel Shokralla	5,054
Windsor Fellowship	Windsor Fellowship Church		Senior Minister (PTO): Vacant	N/A

=== Deanery of Newbury ===
Benefice	Churches	Link	Clergy	Population served
East Downland, Comprising Beedon, Boxford, Chieveley with Winterbourne and Oare, Farnborough, Peasemore, Stockcross, and West Ilsley	St Nicholas, Beedon; St Andrew, Boxford; St Mary the Virgin, Chieveley; St Bartholomew, Oare; St James, Winterbourne; All Saints, Farnborough; St Barnabas, Peasemore; St John, Stockcross; All Saints, West Ilsley		Rector: John Toogood; Curate: William McDowell; SSM: Douglas Dales	4,002
Greenham (St Mary the Virgin)	St Mary the Virgin, Greenham		Vicar: David McLeod; SSM: Brian Jones; SSM: John Bramhall	6,045
Hermitage (Holy Trinity)	Holy Trinity, Hermitage; St Mark, Cold Ash; SS Mary & Nicholas, Compton; St Mary, East Ilsley; St Mary, Hampstead Norreys; St Frideswide, Frilsham; SS Peter & Paul, Yattendon		Team Rector: Vacant; Team Vicar: Lucinda Heyn; SSM: Simon Thorn; SSM: Meg Kirby	10,078
Hungerford (St Lawrence) and Denford	St Lawrence, Hungerford		Vicar: Mike Saunders	5,723
Lambourn Valley, the (St Michael and All Angels)	St Michael & All Angels, Lambourn; All Saints, East Garston; St James the Great, Eastbury		Vicar: Martin Cawte	4,622
Newbury (St George) (St John the Evangelist)	St John the Evangelist, Newbury		Vicar: Becky Bevan; Associate Vicar: Gary Collins; SSM: Terry Winrow	13,455
Newbury (St George) (St John the Evangelist)	St George the Martyr, Wash Common		Vicar: Becky Bevan; Associate Vicar: Gary Collins; SSM: Terry Winrow	13,455
Newbury (St Nicolas and St Mary Speenhamland)	St Nicolas, Newbury		Team Rector: Will Hunter Smart; Curate: Will Briggs; Curate: Joy Mawdesley; SSM: Margaret Yates; SSM: Gill Briggs	10,438
Newbury (St Nicolas and St Mary Speenhamland)	St Mary the Virgin, Speen		Team Rector: Will Hunter Smart; Curate: Will Briggs; Curate: Joy Mawdesley; SSM: Margaret Yates; SSM: Gill Briggs	10,438
Shaw (St Mary) Cum Donnington	St Mary, Shaw		Rector: Raymond Obin; Curate: Ed Yates	9,879
Thatcham (St Mary)	St Mary, Thatcham		Team Rector: Mark Bennet; Team Vicar: Patsy Jones; SSM: Brenda Harland; OLM: Marion Fontaine	25,230
Walbury Beacon Benefice, The, Comprising Combe, Enborne, Hamstead Marshall, Inkpen, Kintbury, and West Woodhay	St Swithun, Combe; St Michael & All Angels, Enborne; St Mary, Hamstead Marshall; St Michael, Inkpen; St Mary the Virgin, Kintbury; St Laurence, West Woodhay		Rector: Annette Shannon; Associate Priest: Vacant	4,014
West Downland, Comprising Brightwalton with Catmore, Chaddleworth, Fawley, Great Shefford, Leckhampstead, and Welford with Wickham	All Saints, Brightwalton; St Andrew, Chaddleworth; St Mary, Fawley; St Mary, Great Shefford; St James, Leckhampstead; St Gregory, Welford; St Swithun, Wickham		Rector: Miriam Keen; SSM: Mary Harwood	2,861

=== Deanery of Reading ===
Deanery website

Benefice	Churches	Link	Clergy	Population served
Caversham (St Andrew)	St Andrew, Caversham (1910)		Vicar: Nigel Jones	4,714
Caversham Thameside (St Peter) (St John the Baptist) and Mapledurham	St Peter, Caversham (MED); St John the Baptist, Caversham (1887); St Margaret, Mapledurham (MED)		Rector: Michael Smith; Curate: Penny Cuthbert; SSM: Rachel Ross	17,627
Earley (St Nicolas)	St Nicolas, Earley (1947)		Vicar: April Beckerleg; SSM: Libby Newman	11,712
Earley (St Peter)	St Peter, Earley		Vicar:	16,374
Earley (Trinity Church)	Trinity Earley (LEP)		Vicar: Jon Salmon	9,263
Emmer Green (St Barnabas) with Caversham Park	St Barnabas, Emmer Green		Rector: Derek Chandler	9,643
Emmer Green (St Barnabas) with Caversham Park	Caversham Park Church (LEP)		Rector: Derek Chandler	9,643
Loddon Reach, Comprising Beech Hill, Shinfield, Spencers Wood and Grazeley, and Swallowfield	St Mary the Virgin, Beech Hill; St Mary, Shinfield; St Michael & All Angels, Spencers Wood; All Saints, Swallowfield		Team Rector: Paul Willis; Team Vicar: David Little; SSM: Chris Leslie; SSM: Cath Spence	10,137
Reading (Christ Church)	Christ Church, Reading (1861)		Vicar: Peter Day; Curate: Liz Ratcliffe	14,318
Reading (Holy Trinity)	Holy Trinity, Reading (1826)		Priest-in-Charge: Bob Simmonds	7,150
Reading (St Agnes with St Paul) (St Barnabas)	St Agnes, Whitley; St Paul, South Whitley; St Barnabas, Reading		Rector: Vernon Orr; Curate: Leon Collyer; Curate: Sue Cady	18,109
Reading (St Giles with St Saviour)	St Giles, Reading (MED)		Rector: David Harris	7,992
Reading (St John the Evangelist and St Stephen)	St John & St Stephen, Reading		Vicar: Vincent Gardner; Curate: Gary Collins	8,216
Reading (St Laurence)	St Laurence, Reading (MED)		Vicar: Christopher Russell; Curate: Chris Jones	0
Reading (St Luke) (St Bartholomew)	St Luke, Reading (1878); St Bartholomew, Earley (1879)		Vicar: Graeme Fancourt; Curate: Richard Christopher; Curate: Serena Tajima; SSM: Christine Blackman	8,486
Reading (St Mark) (All Saints)	St Mark, Reading (1890); All Saints, Reading (1865)		Vicar: Jo Williams	14,973
Reading (St Mary the Virgin)	Minster of St Mary the Virgin, Reading (MED)		Rector: Stephen Pullin; SSM: Sarah Pullin; SSM: Andrew Bond; OLM: Judith Sumner	738
Reading (St Matthew)	St Matthew, Reading		Vicar: Mark Dolphin; SSM: Kirstie Dolphin	13,584
Reading Greyfriars	Greyfriars Church, Reading (1863)		Vicar: David Walker; Curate: Joy Atkins; Curate: Sarah Eden-Jones	3,693
Southlake: St James	St James, Woodley		Vicar: Laurence Smith	15,211
Tilehurst (St Catherine of Siena) and Calcot	St Catherine of Siena, Tilehurst		Vicar: Gill Rowell; OLM: Lorraine Colam	10,040
Tilehurst (St George) (St Mary Magdalen)	St George, Tilehurst		Vicar: Adam Carlill	18,101
Tilehurst (St George) (St Mary Magdalen)	St Mary Magdalen, Tilehurst		Vicar: Adam Carlill	18,101
Tilehurst (St Michael)	St Michael, Tilehurst (MED)		Rector: Vacant	15,381
Woodley (Emmanuel) (St John the Evangelist)	Emmanuel, Woodley (1991)		Vicar: Rose Jones; Vicar: Claire Jones	10,430
Woodley (Emmanuel) (St John the Evangelist)	St John the Evangelist, Woodley		Vicar: Mark Nam; Minister & Asian Fellowship: Richard Christopher	10,430

=== Deanery of Sonning ===
Benefice	Churches	Link	Clergy	Population served
Arborfield (St Bartholomew) with Barkham	St Bartholomew, Arborfield; St James, Barkham; Christ Church Wokingham; Church @ The Green, Arborfield Green (2017)		Rector: Piers Bickersteth; Curate: Julian Bidgood; Curate: Mark Huddleston	6,105
Crowthorne (St John the Baptist)	St John the Baptist, Crowthorne		Vicar: Lisa Cornwell; SSM: David Ramsbottom	6,649
Finchampstead (St James) and California	St James, Finchampstead; SS Mary & John, California; St Eligius, Arborfield Green		Rector: Julie Ramsbottom; Curate: Hannah Brooks; Curate: Julian McAllen; Curate: Antonia Elliott; SSM: John Edwards	10,719
Owlsmoor (St George)	St George, Owlsmoor		Vicar: Catherine Vaughan	8,862
Ruscombe (St James the Great) and Twyford with Hurst	St James the Great, Ruscombe; St Mary the Virgin, Twyford; St Nicholas, Hurst		Vicar: Anna Harwood; Hon. Curate: Graham Theobald; Hon. Curate: Clifford Smith	9,444
Sandhurst (St Michael and All Angels)	St Michael & All Angels, Sandhurst		Rector: John Castle	11,811
Sonning (St Andrew) (St Patrick)	St Andrew, Sonning		Vicar: Jamie Taylor; SSM: Katie Toogood	4,775
Wargrave (St Mary the Virgin) with Knowl Hill	St Mary the Virgin, Wargrave; St Peter, Knowl Hill; St Paul, Warren Row		Vicar: John Cook; Curate: Hugh Barne; Curate: Stephen Turville	4,411
Winnersh (St Mary the Virgin)	St Mary the Virgin, Winnersh; St Catherine, Bearwood		Rector: Vacant	9,776
Wokingham (All Saints)	All Saints, Wokingham		Rector: David Hodgson	13,431
Wokingham (St Paul)	St Paul, Wokingham; Woosehill Church (LEP); St Nicholas' Community Church, Emmbrook		Rector: Richard Lamey; Curate: Julie Mintern; Curate: Patrick Mukholi; SSM: Roy Holmes; SSM: Judi Hattaway	17,592
Wokingham (St Sebastian)	St Sebastian, Wokingham		Vicar: Andrew Marsden; SSM: Erik Fudge; SSM: Ian Seymour	8,464

== Other foundations employing Church of England clergy within the diocesan area ==
Organisation	Churches	Link	Clergy
College of St George, Windsor	Royal Chapel of All Saints, Windsor; St George's Chapel, Windsor Castle		Dean: David Conner; Canon: Hueston Finlay; Canon: Martin Poll; Canon: Mark Powell; Canon: Franklin Lee; Succentor: Bruce Russell

== See also ==
- Oliver Almond
- Oxford Diocesan Guild of Church Bell Ringers
