= Green End =

Green End may refer to many villages in the United Kingdom:

- Green End, Bedfordshire
- Green End, Buckinghamshire
- Green End, Cambridgeshire
- Green End, Hertfordshire
- Green End, Lancashire
- Green End, North Yorkshire

== See also ==
- Greenend, an area of Coatbridge, Scotland
- Green's End, Rhode Island, USA
