= Oliver Almond =

English writer

Oliver Almond was a Roman Catholic priest and writer, born in the diocese of Oxford. He is believed by Foley to have been the brother of the martyr, John Almond; but Gillow has shown that this is probably a mistake.

== Biography ==
Oliver was educated at the English Colleges at Rome (1582–87) and Valladolid, and was a missionary in England. He was made George Birkhead 's assistant in Staffordshire in September of 1612 instead of Ralph Stamford. After a year Birkhead substituted him because Almond had been arrested and imprisoned. In July 1613 he was released for a sum of money. He presented the English College at Rome with a precious chalice. Some of his correspondence is preserved in the Westminster Archives, and he is conjectured by Gillow to have been the writer of a work entitled The Uncasing of Heresies, or the Anatomie of Protestancie, written and composed by O.A. (Leuven/Louvain?) 1623, 8vo.
