= SS Peter and Andrew's Church, Old Windsor =

Church of St Peter and St Andrew
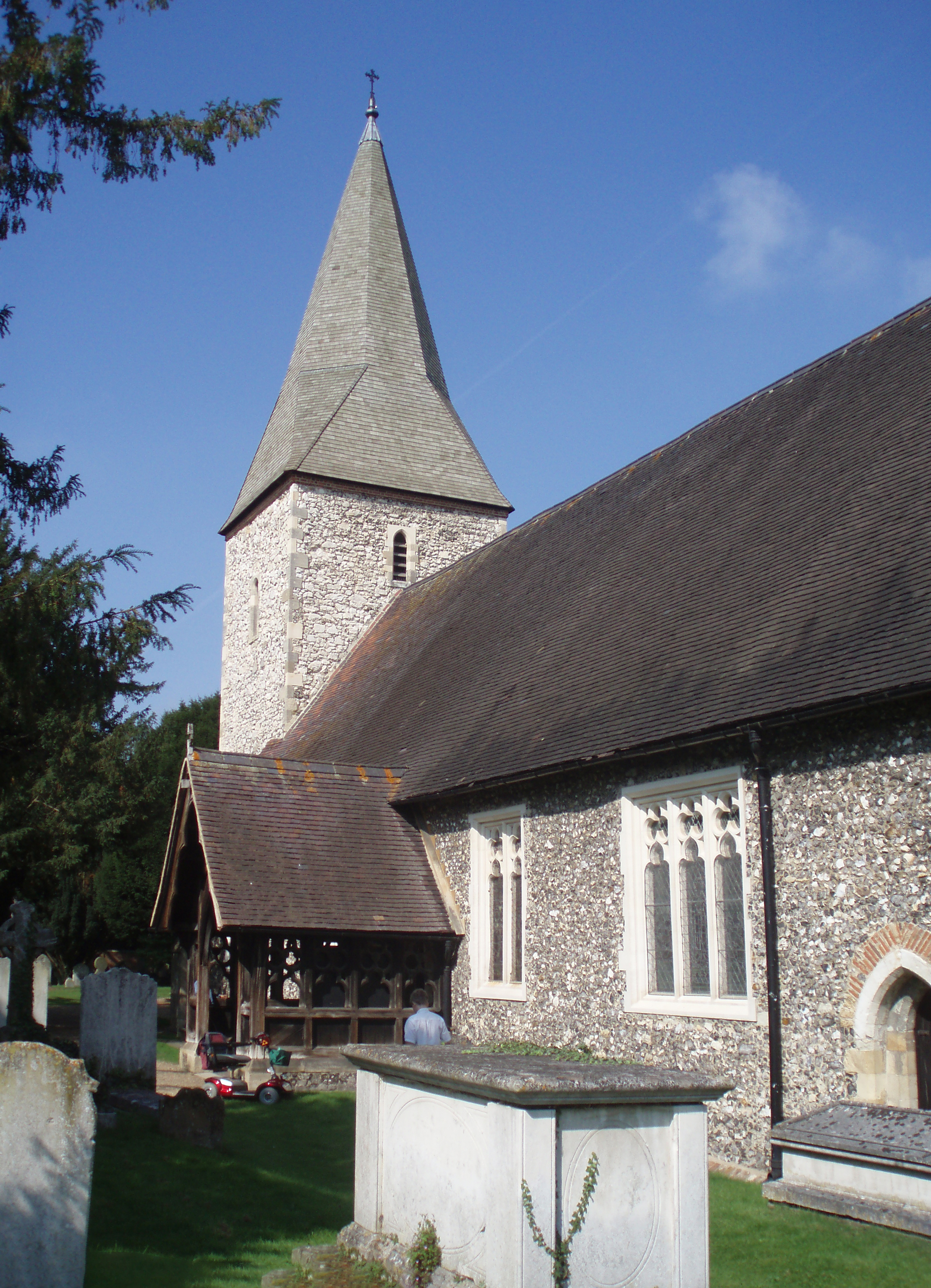
- The church building viewed from the southeast
- Church of St Peter and St Andrew
- Location: Old Windsor, Berkshire
- Country: England
- Denomination: Church of England
- Website: oldwindsorchurch.org.uk

Administration
- Diocese: Diocese of Oxford
- Archdeaconry: Archdeaconry of Berkshire
- Deanery: Maidenhead and Windsor
- Parish: Old Windsor

Clergy
- Vicar: The Rev'd Adel Shokralla

The Church of St Peter and St Andrew is an historic Church of England parish church at Old Windsor in the English county of Berkshire. It is located at the end of Church Road near the River Thames.

The church is first mentioned in extant records in 1216 and the parish registers date from 1612. Restored and rebuilt in 1863, it still retains its original Early English chancel and tower. Nikolaus Pevsner, writing in 1975, described the wall paintings as "a matter of wonder". The churchyard contains the grave of celebrated Georgian actress Mary 'Perdita' Robinson, Shakespearean actress and alleged mistress of King George IV. The church celebrates Holy Communion every Sunday 11:15 am, although more family informal services are also held at parish church, Old Windsor 9:15 am.

The church experienced a fire on Easter Sunday morning, 24 March 2008. It was badly damaged but quickly repaired.

== History of the Parish Church ==
The Parish Church of St Peter and St Andrew was probably built on the site of the chapel attached to King Edward the Confessor’s hunting lodge, and it is possible that it was the king who added his favourite saint, Saint Peter, to an original dedication to St Andrew. Several synods or meetings of bishops took place here in the early days.

After King John had been obliged to set his seal to Magna Carta in 1215, mercenary French soldiers came through Old Windsor and destroyed the church, which may have been mainly built of wood. The church was rebuilt in 1218 and had thick walls and small windows. During medieval times some of these windows were replaced with larger ones.

In Georgian times, the church had a stone porch, in which weddings were sometimes celebrated, and on the tower was a small cupola. An avenue of larch trees, of which some stumps can still be seen, led to the north door. As wealthy families moved into the village, bringing their servants, there was not enough room in church and a gallery was built at the west end to accommodate the children. However, as they were badly behaved it was necessary to appoint a beadle to keep them in order. The church contained many large memorials.

By 1865 restoration was needed and the architect Giles Gilbert Scott carried out an extensive plan, removing the porch, the gallery and the three-decker pulpit, and installing the rood screen, pews and choir vestry which we have today. The spire was built to replace the cupola. Three extra bells were added to the five dating from 1775, to make the ring up to eight bells.

Subsequently, restoration campaigns have resulted in the replacement of much of the damaged stonework around the windows and on the tower. The spire has also been re-shingled several times. The church suffered a serious fire on Easter Day 2008 but has now been fully restored.

== Gallery ==
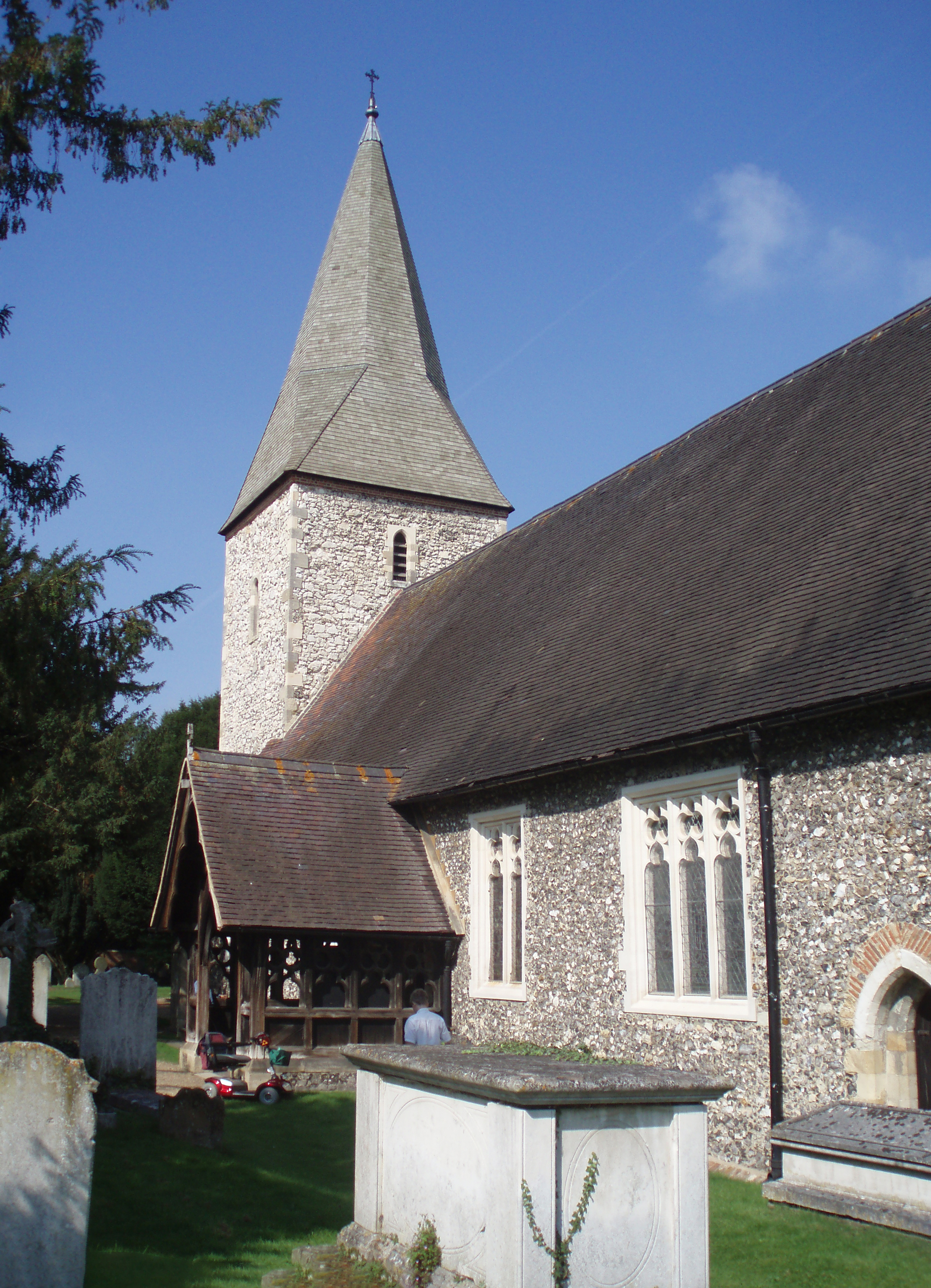
Spire

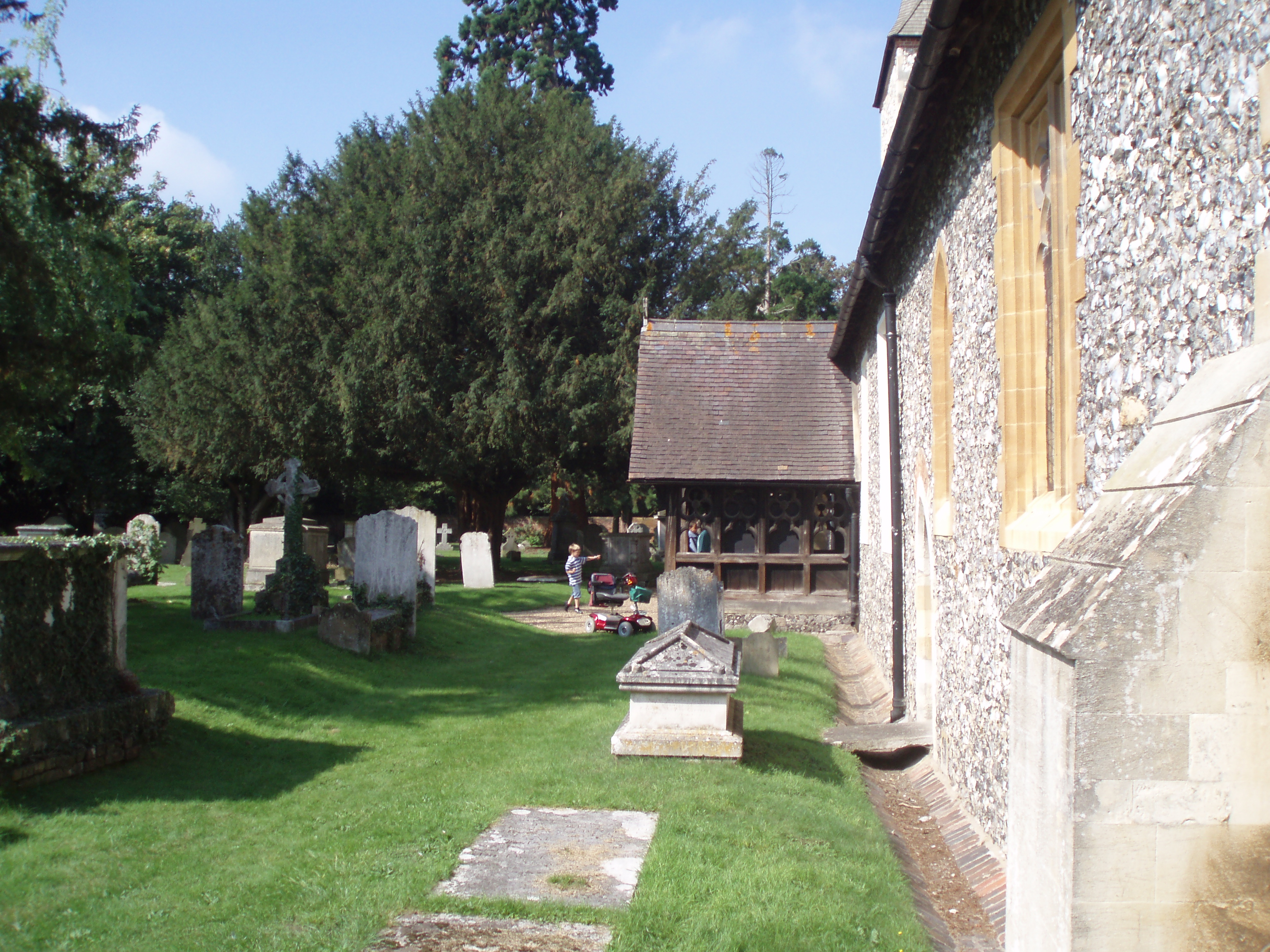
Perditia's plot

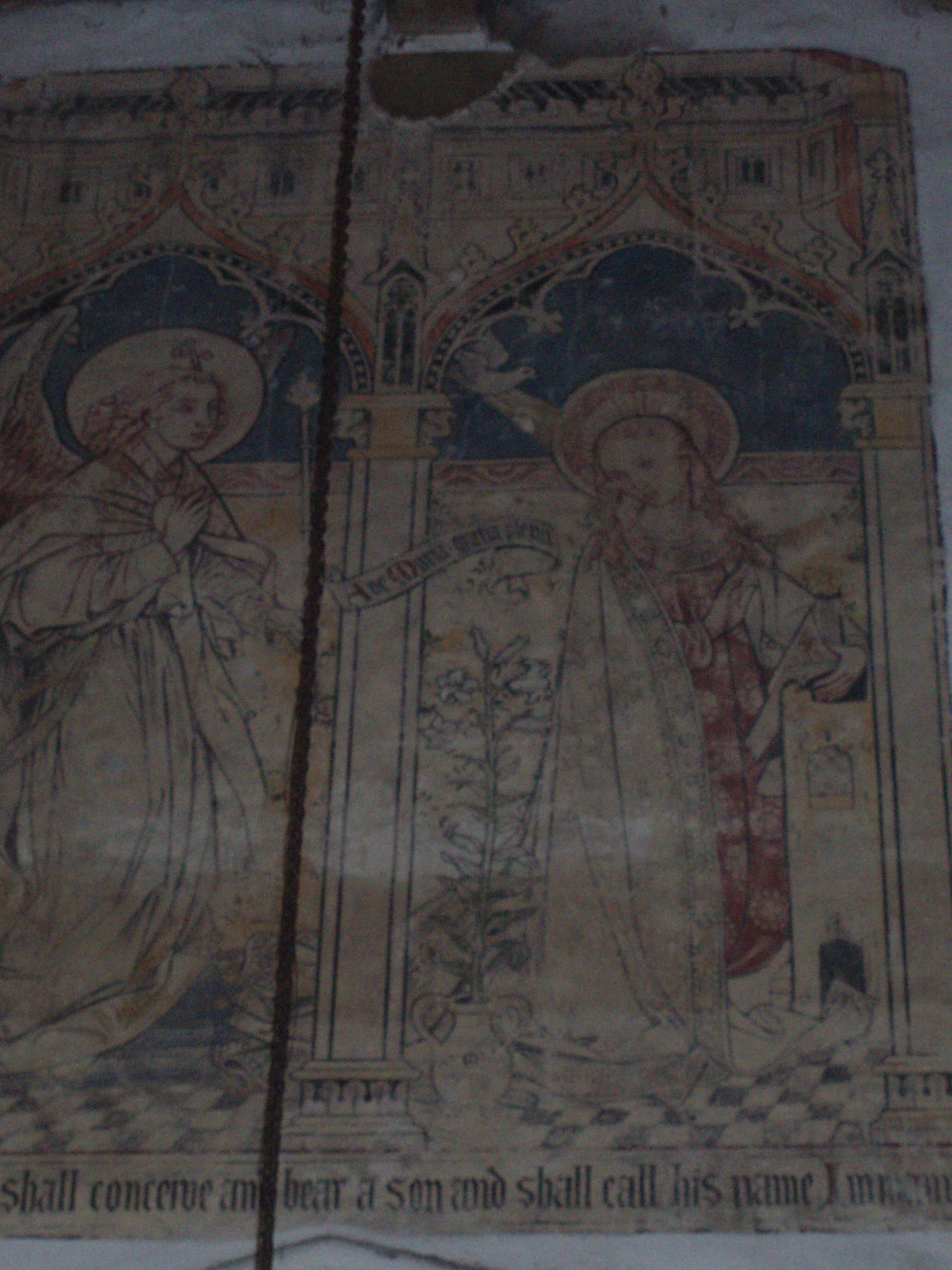
Wall painting

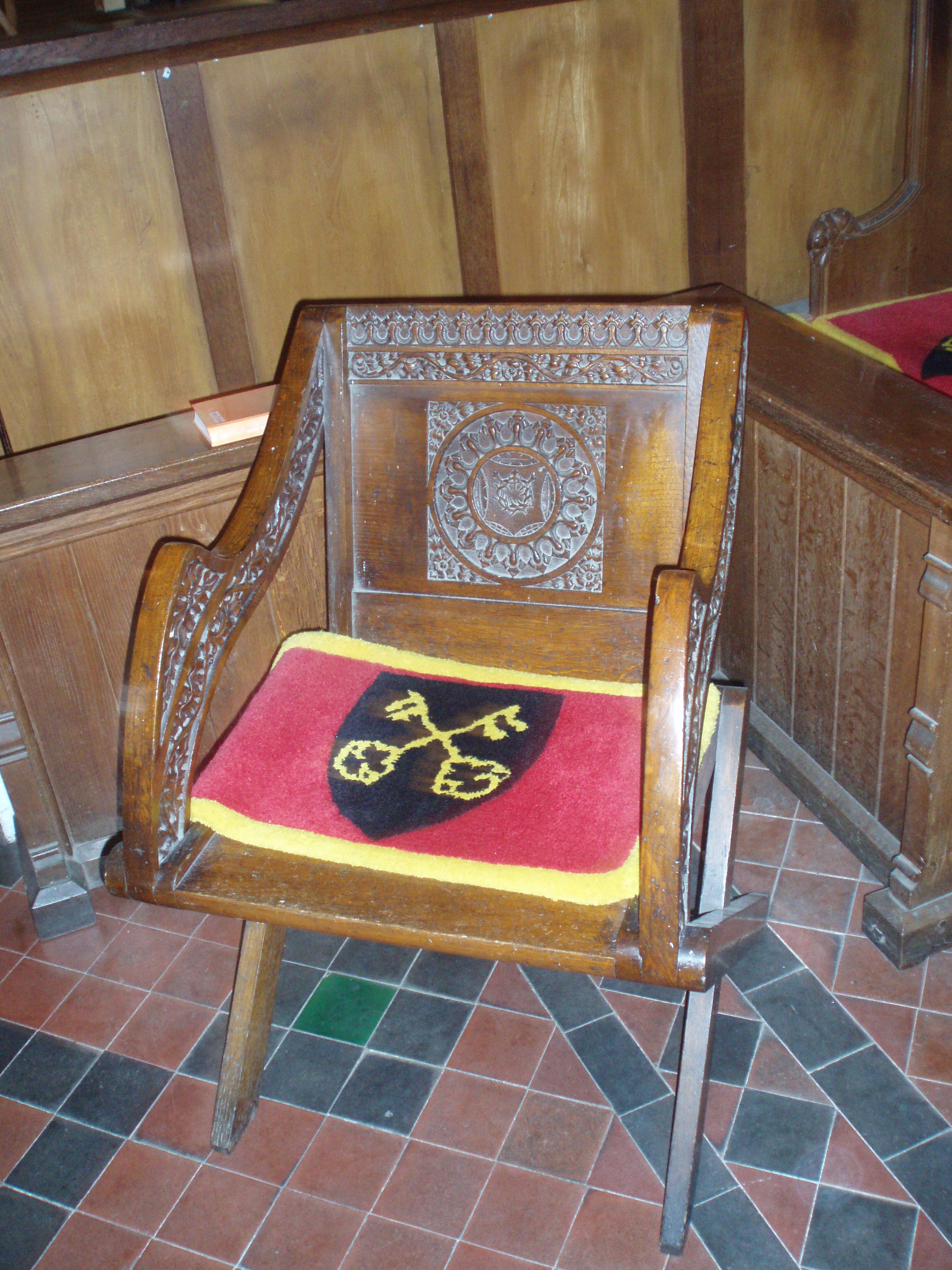
Bishops Chair

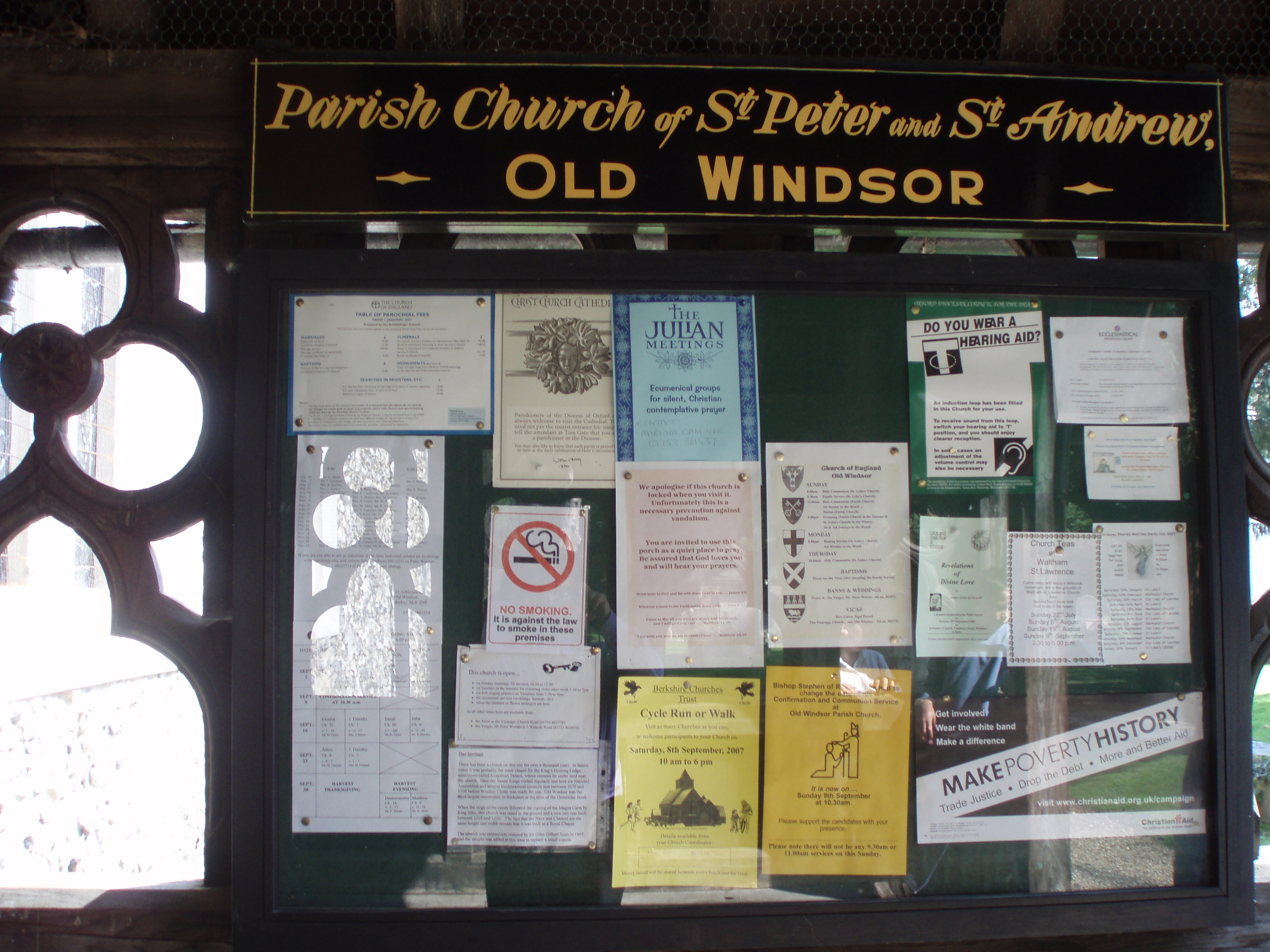
Notice board
