= St Luke's Church, Maidenhead =

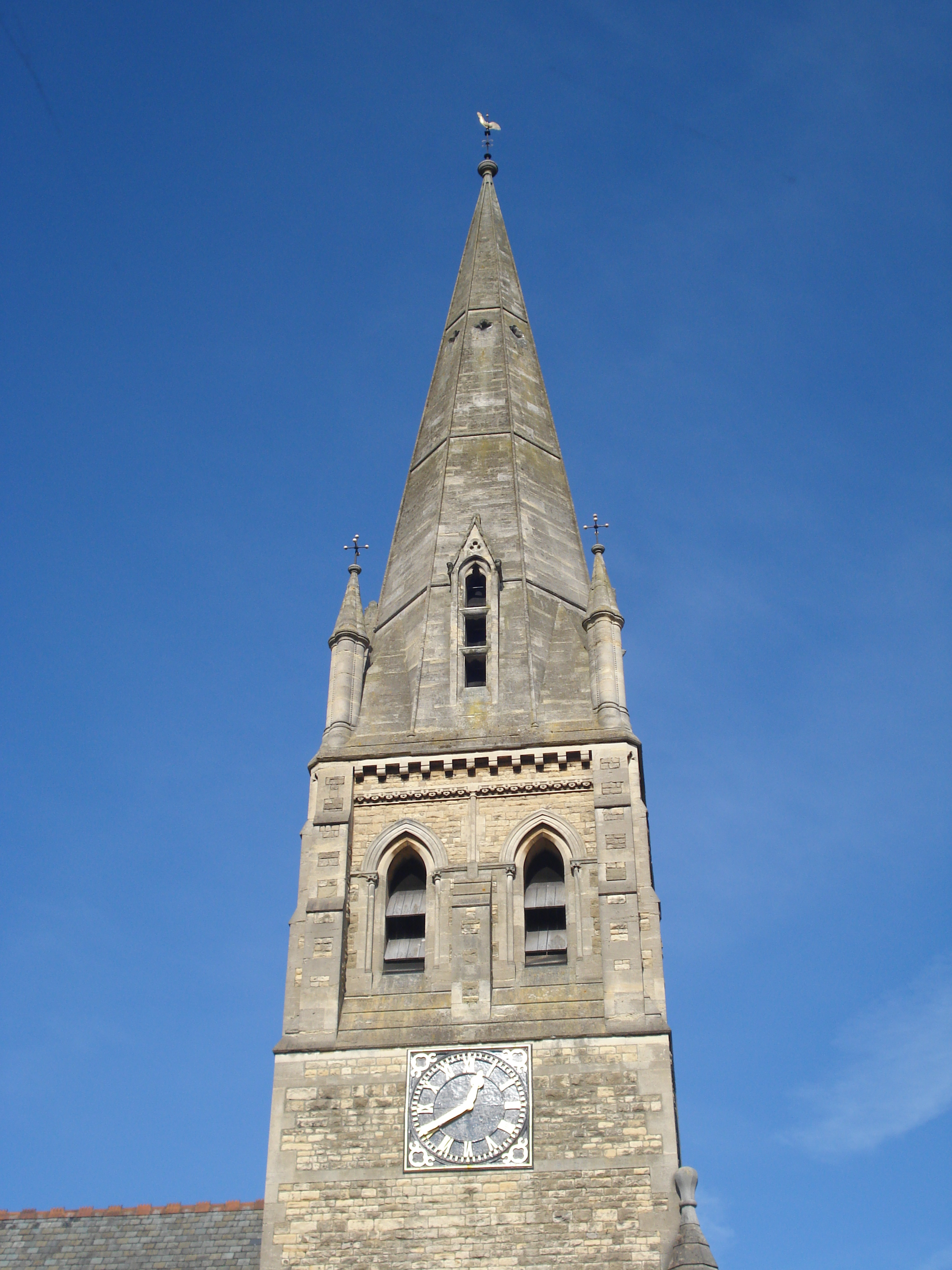
- St Luke's Church, Maidenhead
- St Luke's Church, Maidenhead
- 51.5267°N 0.7232°W
- Denomination: Church of England
- Churchmanship: Central churchmanship / Anglo Catholic
- Website: www.stlukeschurchmaidenhead.org.uk

History
- Dedication: St Luke

Administration
- Province: Canterbury
- Diocese: Oxford
- Deanery: Windsor & Maidenhead
- Parish: St Luke, Maidenhead

Clergy
- Vicar: Revd Sally Lynch

St Luke's Church is a Church of England parish church in Maidenhead in the English county of Berkshire.

== History ==
St Luke's Church was consecrated in 1866 by William Wilberforce. At a cost of £3500, it was designed by architect George Row Clarke of London, and built by James Griffiths of Eldersfield. A tower was added in 1869, and then a spire was built in 1894.

== The Church today ==
The church building remains the largest church in Maidenhead, and as a result has been used for the recording of Songs of Praise on two occasions. Recent alterations to the church include new glazed entrance doors, a new servery at the west end, refurbished kitchen and toilets, and new vestry and office created in the former Parish Centre.

== Ministry team ==
The Vicar since Sept 2026 is the Revd Adam Wingrove. He is assisted by the Revd Terrie Robinson.
