= Great Horwood =

Village in Buckinghamshire, England

Coordinates: 51.973°N 0.878°W

- Location within Buckinghamshire
- Population: 1,049 (2011 Census)
- OS grid reference: SP770312
- Civil parish: Great Horwood
- Unitary authority: Buckinghamshire
- Ceremonial county: Buckinghamshire
- Region: South East
- Country: England
- Sovereign state: United Kingdom
- Post town: MILTON KEYNES
- Postcode district: MK17
- Dialling code: 01296
- Police: Thames Valley
- Fire: Buckinghamshire
- Ambulance: South Central
- UK Parliament: Buckingham and Bletchley

Great Horwood is a small village and civil parish within the unitary authority area of Buckinghamshire, England. At the 2011 Census it had a population of 1,049. It is about five miles ESE of Buckingham, six miles WSW of Milton Keynes.

== History and locale ==
The name 'Horwood' is Anglo Saxon in origin, and means 'muddy wood'. The affix 'Great' was added later to differentiate it from the adjacent village Little Horwood. In the Anglo-Saxon Chronicle in 792 the village was recorded as Horwudu.

The village was from ancient times on the periphery of the Whaddon Chase: royal hunting land that stretched across the north part of the Aylesbury Vale. In 1447 the village was granted Royal charter to hold a weekly market, thus becoming a market town. The rents from the market were collected by New College, Oxford. Great Horwood is no longer a market town. In 1996, the lordship of the manor of Great Horwood was sold by New College to D. Jackson "Jack" Smith, an American lawyer and former member of the Tennessee House of Representatives.

A hamlet within the parish border of Great Horwood is Singleborough.

== Notable buildings ==
Both Great Horwood village itself and Singleborough have Conservation Areas and there are 46 Grade II listed buildings in the Parish. Great Horwood has two historic pubs: The Swan Inn on Winslow Road and The Crown, on the village green, which closed in 2019.

The parish church is dedicated to St James.

Great Horwood Church of England Combined School is a voluntary controlled Church of England primary school. The school is mixed, with approximately 160 pupils, aged between four and eleven. Its catchment area also includes the villages of Thornborough, Nash, Beachampton and Whaddon.

== Pictures ==
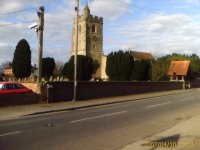
Great Horwood Church

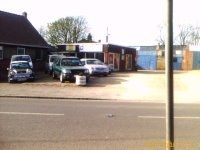
Garages in Great Horwood

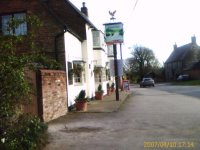
The Swan, Great Horwood

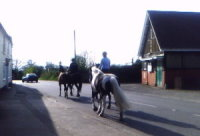
Horses in the village
