= Pitchcott =

Village in Buckinghamshire, England

Coordinates: 51.8777°N 0.8733°W

- Location within Buckinghamshire
- Population: 44 (2001 census)
- OS grid reference: SP7720
- Civil parish: Pitchcott
- Unitary authority: Buckinghamshire
- Ceremonial county: Buckinghamshire
- Region: South East
- Country: England
- Sovereign state: United Kingdom
- Post town: Aylesbury
- Postcode district: HP22
- Dialling code: 01296
- Police: Thames Valley
- Fire: Buckinghamshire
- Ambulance: South Central
- UK Parliament: Buckingham and Bletchley
- Website: Pitchcott Parish Meeting

Pitchcott is a village and civil parish in the Aylesbury Vale district of Buckinghamshire, England. It is about 3 miles (5 km) north-east of Waddesdon, slightly less than 4 miles (6.4 km) south of Winslow and slightly more than 4 miles north of Aylesbury. It is in the civil parish of Oving.

The parish is small, covering 925 acres (374 ha). The highest point is Pitchcott Hill, about 510 feet (160 m) above sea level. The village is on the eastern brow of the hill, between about 445 feet (136 m) and 475 feet (145 m) above sea level.

== Archaeology ==
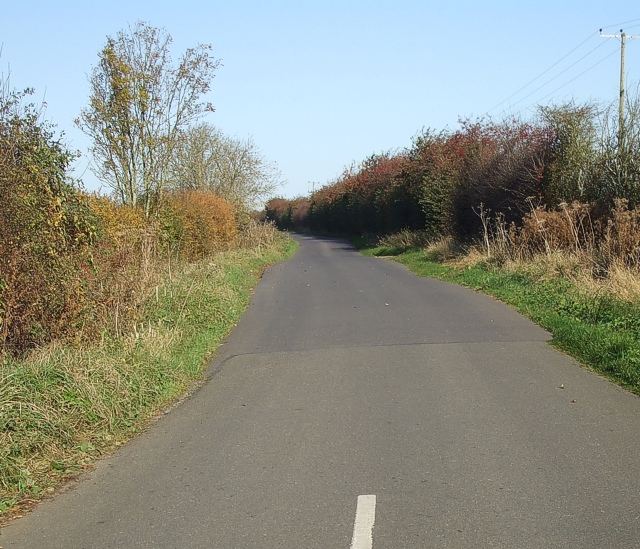
Carter's Lane along the parish's western boundary is a former Roman road.

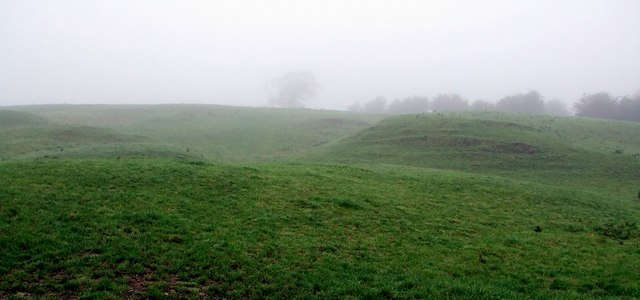
Some of the medieval earthworks showing that Pitchcott is a shrunken village

A Roman road called Carter's Lane forms part of the parish's western boundary with Quainton. There is some evidence of Roman occupation south of the village.

Pitchcott is a shrunken village: around the surviving settlement, to the south-east and in other directions, are medieval house platforms and traces of tracks. South-west of the former parish church is a mound that may have been the base of a medieval windmill. The parish also has good examples of ridge and furrow, showing that in the Middle Ages some of the land now farmed as pasture used to be arable.

In 1927 only about 32 acres (13 ha) were arable and 887 acres (359 ha) was grassland. A transition from arable farming to sheep pasture in previous centuries, aided by enclosure, may explain why Pitchcott village shrank.

== Manor ==
The toponym is derived from the Old English for "cottage where pitch is stored". Pitchcott is not named in the Domesday Book of 1086 or in 12th-century records. In 1225 the manor was one fee of the Honour of Wallingford. In 1540 this was merged with the Honour of Ewelme in Oxfordshire, and the last mention of Pitchcott's overlordship dates from 1550.

In 1225 Pitchcott's mesne lord was Roger Pipard and in 1284 it was held by Robert Pipard. In the 14th century it passed to the Earls of Hereford and in 1377, four years after the death of Humphrey de Bohun, 7th Earl of Hereford it was held by his heirs in attachment to the manor of Great Haseley in Oxfordshire. The 7th Earl died with no male heir, so Pitchcott passed via his elder daughter, Eleanor de Bohun, to his granddaughter, Anne of Gloucester, who became married to Edmund Stafford, 5th Earl of Stafford. The last-known record of the mesne lordship is from 1400, three years before Edmund Stafford died.

In 1225 Roger Pipard's tenant was Richard Vernon of Haddon, Derbyshire. Both Haddon and Pitchcott remained in the Vernon family until Sir George Vernon died in 1566, leaving them to his daughter, Margaret Stanley. In 1588 her son Edward mortgaged Pitchcott to Richard Saunders (d. 1601), whose family were the lords of several other manors in Buckinghamshire and Hertfordshire, including the manor of Puttenham. The Saunders had established themselves in Buckinghamshire during the previous two centuries and Richard had married Elizabeth Blount, whose family were descendants of Sir Walter Blount (d. 1403). In the 17th century, Pitchcott manor passed to Richard Saunders' eldest son, John Saunders, who had married Anne Hawtrey, the daughter of William Hawtrey (d. 1597) of Chequers. John's daughter Elizabeth had married Sir Walter Pye, and Sir Walter and Lady Elizabeth Pye conveyed Pitchcott manor to her uncles Sir Thomas and Francis Saunders. The manor was held in moieties by the two branches of the Saunders family. Francis Saunders was imprisoned briefly for debt and Sir Thomas Saunders (1593–1653) had to come to his aid. As part of the repayment, much of the lands and rights to the manor of Pitchcott were conveyed by Francis Saunders to Sir Thomas Saunders. Several members of the Saunders family served as High Sheriff of Buckinghamshire.

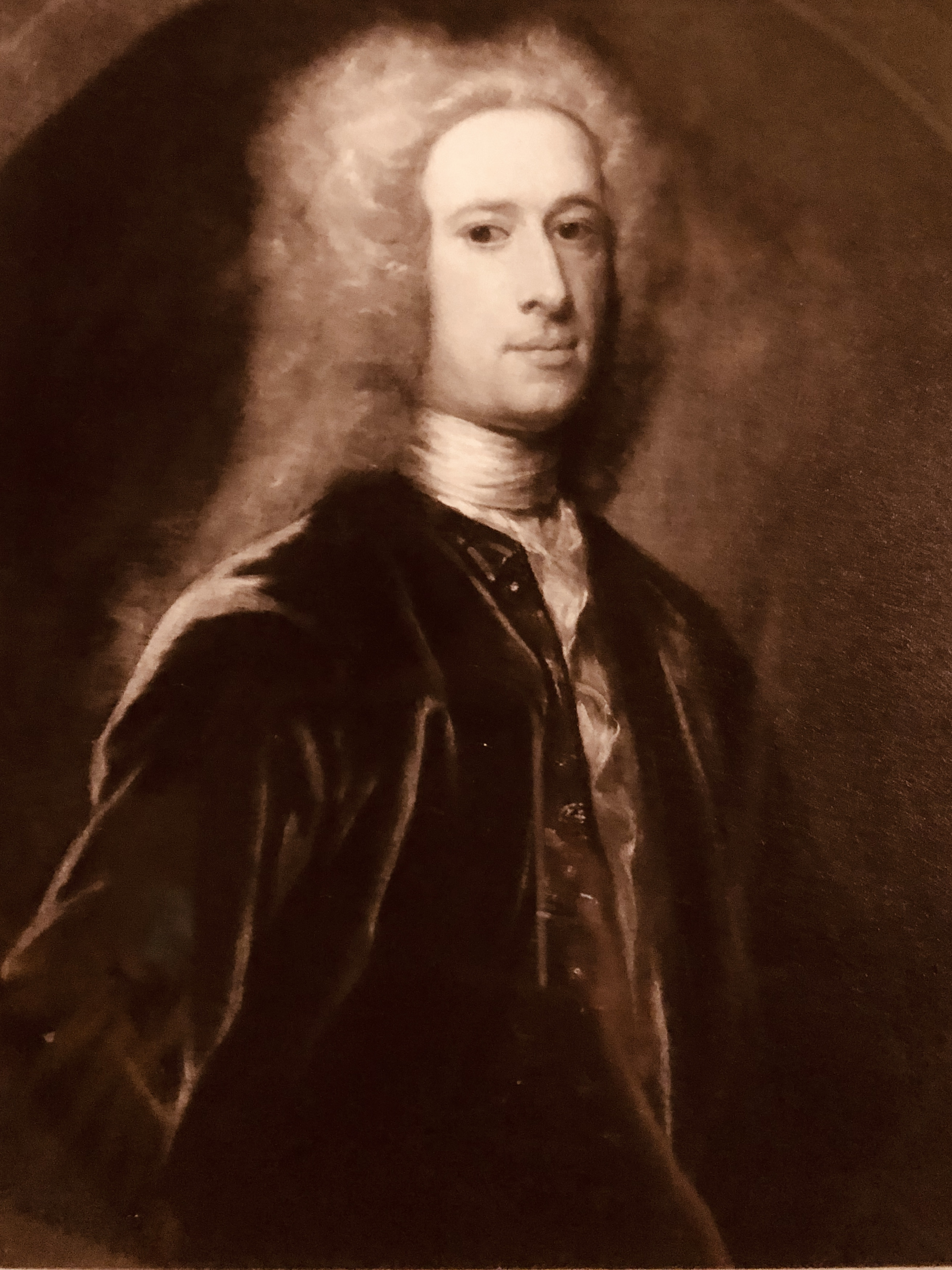
Sir Thomas Saunders (1665–1741) of Pitchcott and Newland

The branch of the Saunders family that descended from Sir Thomas Saunders (1593–1653) benefited from the majority of the income from the estate. Sir Thomas Saunders was listed as the Lord of the Manor of Pitchcott by Richard Grenville on his list of Buckinghamshire Gentry in 1640. Thomas Saunders (d. 1690) was the heir of Sir Thomas Saunders. Thomas had married Elizabeth Proby, a daughter of Sir Heneage Proby and the sister of Sir Thomas Proby, 1st Baronet of Elton. His son, Sir Thomas Saunders (1665–1741) inherited the manor, although he resided at the other estate he possessed called Newland Park in Chalfont St Peter, Buckinghamshire. Both Pitchcott and Newland Park were held by several more generations of the descendants of Sir Thomas Saunders until a cousin, Gov. Thomas Saunders (1713–1775) of Brill House, purchased their moiety. This Thomas Saunders had been President of Madras for the British East India Company and had built a substantial fortune during his tenure there. Thomas had married Christian Pitt, the niece of William Pitt, 1st Earl of Chatham, who served as Prime Minister of Great Britain. Thomas and Christian Saunders' son, Thomas, inherited the manor. Thomas had been an officer in the army but retired early and moved to Vienna. The running of the estate at Pitchcott was left to a manager, a Mr. Chaplin. Thomas died childless and the manor passed to his cousin, Thomas Saunders, who died in 1831. Pitchcott was divided between his two surviving sisters and two nieces. In 1852 their representatives sold Pitchcott to Mayer Amschel de Rothschild, but in 1853 he exchanged it with Christ Church, Oxford for property at Mentmore. Christ Church still held Pitchcott in the 1920s. The eldest male line of the Saunders family emigrated to Guelph in what was then Upper Canada in the mid-19th century.

Pitchcott held a manorial court in the 15th and 16th centuries.

== Parish church ==
The 12th-century Church of England parish church of Saint Giles has been deconsecrated and converted to a private house, but the churchyard remains in use. Pitchcott is now part of the ecclesiastical parish of Oving with Pitchcott, for which the parish church is All Saints' in Oving, 1 mile (1.6 km) north-east of Pitchcott.

The oldest part of St Giles' is the nave, which is probably 12th-century. The chancel was built in the first half of the 13th century, and its south wall retains its two original lancet windows. The more easterly of the two windows has a low sill forming a sedile. In the east jamb of the westerly window was a 13th-century stone book-rest. The priest's door on its south side of the chancel was inserted in about 1340.

In the nave the present north doorway and the two south windows were inserted in the 15th century. The north doorway is now blocked. The west tower was added in the 15th century, and its upper stage was added or rebuilt in the 16th century. A datestone states that the south porch was built or rebuilt in 1662. The church was over-restored in 1864. The work included inserting two north windows in the nave to match the 15th-century south ones, and building a new chancel arch. The chancel east window has 19th-century stained glass.

St Giles' has three bells in the tower and a sanctus bell. The second bell is inscribed "Sent Luke Apostel, 1590" and may have been cast by Robert III Newcombe and Bartholomew Atton of Buckingham. The other two bells were cast by the Chandler family of bell-founders of Drayton Parslow: the treble in 1686 by an unknown member of the family and the tenor by George Chandler in 1717. St Giles' had two silver communion services: a paten and small chalice dating from 1569, and an 1871 chalice with an 1884 paten.

The ecclesiastical parish of St Giles was united with that of All Saints', Oving in 1902. By the end of 1967 St Giles' had been deconsecrated and its fittings sold and dispersed. The stone book-rest in the chancel was removed to All Saints', Oving. St Giles' was then converted into a private house. It is a Grade II* listed building.

John Womborn was parson of 'Pitchcote' in 1401.

== Economic history ==
A datestone records that Manor Farmhouse was built in 1657. The house was altered in the 18th century and, subsequently, now has an irregular L-shaped plan. Lower Farmhouse is a symmetrical building dating from about 1830.

== Sources and further reading ==
- Bailey, K.A. (2001). "The Smallest Estates in Domesday Buckinghamshire". Records of Buckinghamshire. 41. Aylesbury: Buckinghamshire Archaeological Society: 233. ISSN 0967-2885.
- Chalkley, Barbara (1985). Three Deserted Villages in the Vale of Aylesbury: Burston, Moreton, Pitchcott. (unpublished document).
- Page, W.H., ed. (1927). A History of the County of Buckingham. Victoria County History. Vol. 4. pp. 89–91.
- Pevsner, Nikolaus (1960). Buckinghamshire. The Buildings of England. Harmondsworth: Penguin Books. p. 224. ISBN 0-14-071019-1.
- Pitchcott-Whitchurch Ridge (pdf). Landscape Character Type: LCT 9 Low Hills and Ridges. Vol. LCA 9.3. Aylesbury Vale District Council & Buckinghamshire County Council. 2008.
- Reed, Michael (1979). Hoskins, W.G.; Millward, Roy (eds.). The Buckinghamshire Landscape. The Making of the English Landscape. London: Hodder & Stoughton. p. 46. ISBN 0-340-19044-2.
- RCHME (1913). An Inventory of the Historical Monuments in Buckinghamshire. Vol. 2 – North. London: Royal Commission on the Historical Monuments of England. pp. 235–236.
- Viney, E. (1991). "Buckinghamshire Churches in the Eighteen Forties". Records of Buckinghamshire. 33. Aylesbury: Buckinghamshire Archaeological Society: 81. ISSN 0967-2885.
