= Granborough =

Village in Buckinghamshire, England

Coordinates: 51.917°N 0.884°W

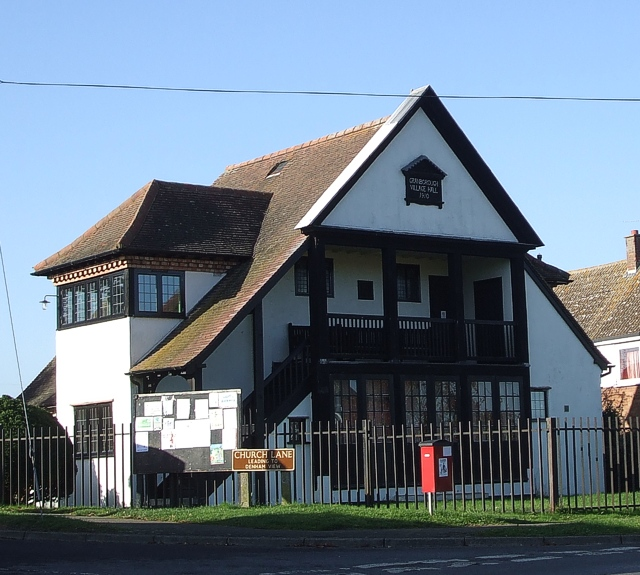
- Granborough Village Hall

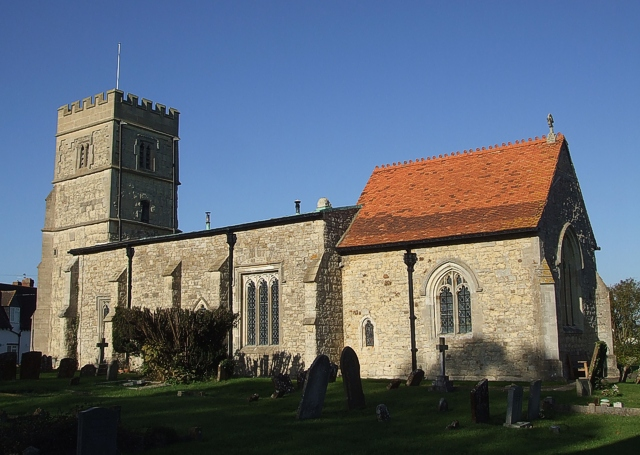
- St. John the Baptist Church

- Location within Buckinghamshire
- Population: 545 (2011)
- OS grid reference: SP768250
- Civil parish: Granborough
- Unitary authority: Buckinghamshire
- Ceremonial county: Buckinghamshire
- Region: South East
- Country: England
- Sovereign state: United Kingdom
- Post town: BUCKINGHAM
- Postcode district: MK18
- Dialling code: 01296
- Police: Thames Valley
- Fire: Buckinghamshire
- Ambulance: South Central
- UK Parliament: Buckingham and Bletchley
- Website: Granborough Parish Council

Granborough (previously Grandborough) is a village and civil parish in Buckinghamshire, England. It is around 5 miles (8 km) north of Waddesdon and 7 miles (11 km) south-east of Buckingham. The nearest town is Winslow.

The village name is Anglo-Saxon in origin, and means 'green hill'. In the Domesday Book of 1086 the village was recorded as Grenesberga.

Anciently the manor of Granborough was owned by the abbey at St Albans, though in the Dissolution of the Monasteries in 1547 ownership passed automatically to the Crown.

The ancient parish church, dedicated to St John the Baptist, was demolished during the English Civil War, though was rebuilt shortly after the Restoration of the Monarchy in 1685.

The village is still one of the possessions of the Crown.

There is a public house, logically called the Crown. After the parish church the most interesting building is the neat half-timbered Arts and Crafts village hall. Granborough still has very many thatched cottages and houses, many of them in Green End, a hamlet attached to the village.
