= List of monastic houses in Suffolk =

The following is a list of monastic houses in Suffolk, England.

Locations of monastic houses in Suffolk
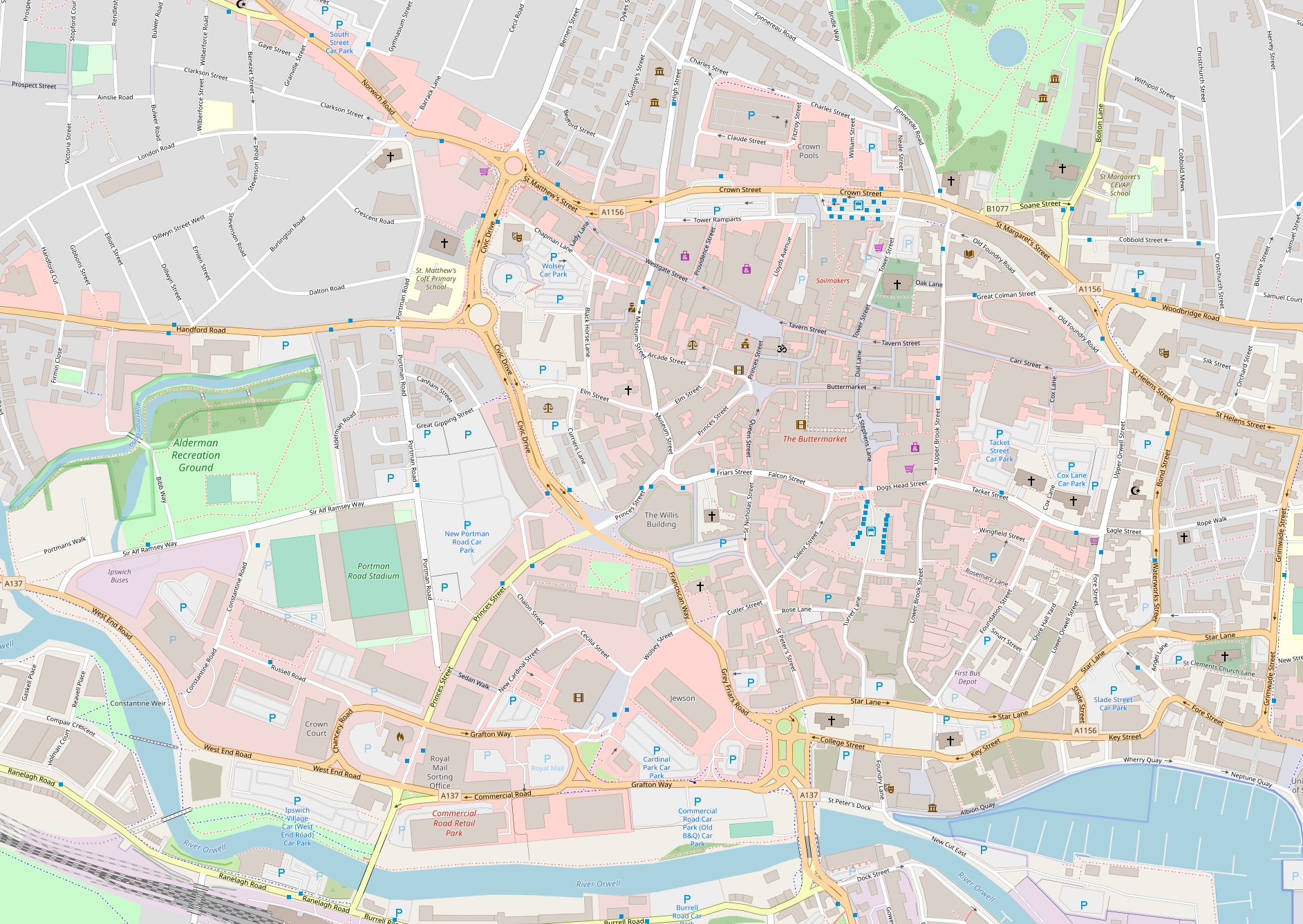
Locations of monastic houses in Ipswich
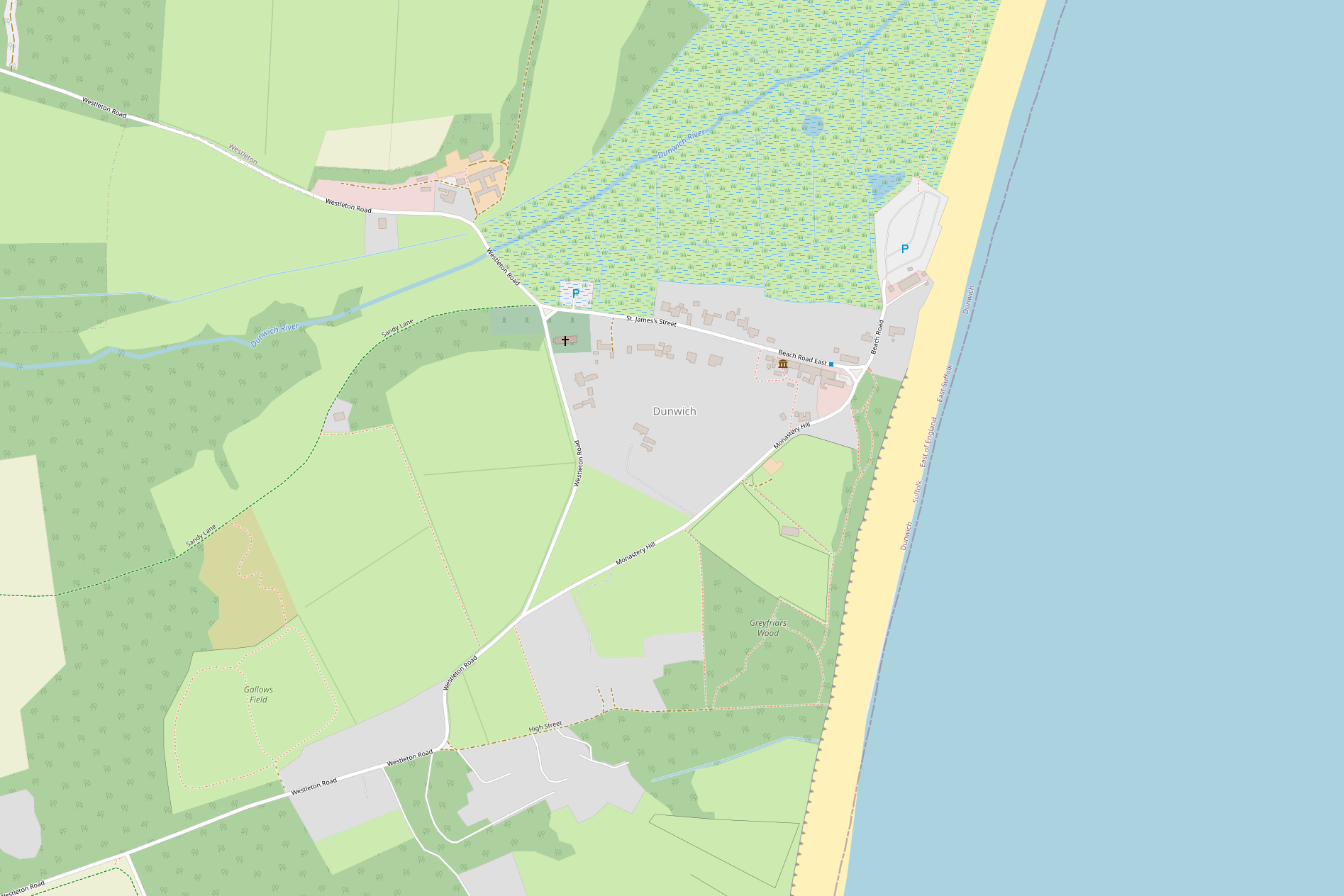
Locations of monastic houses in Dunwich

Alien houses are included, as are smaller establishments such as cells and notable monastic granges (particularly those with resident monks), and also camerae of the military orders of monks (Knights Templar and Knights Hospitaller). Monastic hospitals are included where they had the status or function of an abbey, priory, or preceptor/commandery.

Abbreviations and key

Status of remains
Symbol	Status
None	Ruins
*	Current monastic function
^{+}	Current non-monastic ecclesiastic function (including remains incorporated into later structure)
^	Current non-ecclesiastic function (including remains incorporated into later structure) or redundant intact structure
^{$}	Remains limited to earthworks etc.
^{#}	No identifiable trace of the monastic foundation remains
^{~}	Exact site of monastic foundation unknown
^{≈}	Identification ambiguous or confused

Locations with names in italics indicate possible duplication (misidentification with another location) or non-existent foundations (either erroneous reference or proposed foundation never implemented) or ecclesiastical establishments with a monastic name but lacking actual monastic connection.

Trusteeship
EH	English Heritage
LT	Landmark Trust
NT	National Trust

Foundation	Image	Communities & provenance	Formal name or dedication and alternative names	References and location
Alnesbourne Priory		Augustinian Canons Regular founded c.1200, probably by Alberte de Neville, who granted endowments; appropriated to Woodbridge probably c.1466; dissolved before 1514; granted to Sir John Wingfield 1541/2	The Priory Church of the Blessed Virgin Mary, Alnesbourne ____________________; Alnesbourn Priory; Alnesborn Priory; Alensborne Priory	
Babwell Greyfriars		Franciscan Friars Minor, Conventual (under the Custody of Cambridge) transferred from earlier foundation at Bury St Edmunds; founded 19 November 1262; dissolved December 1538, surrendered to Richard Yngworth, Bishop of Dover; granted to Anthony Harvey May 1541		
Battisford Preceptory		Knights Hospitaller preceptory/hospital founded c.1154, benefactions from Henry II; dissolved 1540		
Blakenham Priory		Benedictine monks alien house: dependent on Bec-Hellouin Abbey; manor granted to Bec-Hellouin by Walter Giffard, 'Earl of Buckingham' founded before 1092; dissolved before 1230, apparently reduced to grange; transferred as a parcel to Ogbourne St George; granted to Eton College 1460	Great Blakenham Priory	
Blythburgh Blackfriars		Dominican Friars licence obtained 1384 to move from Dunwich, when that location was threatened by the sea but transfer never implemented		
Blythburgh Priory		Augustinian Canons Regular — from St. Osyth's Abbey, Essex ependent on St Osyth; founded before 1135, assisted by Henry I and the Clavering family; dissolved 12 February 1537 and granted to Sir Arthur Hopton 1538/9	The Priory Church of the Blessed Virgin Mary, Blythburgh ____________________; Bliburgh Priory	
Bruisyard Abbey		secular college (community founded at Campsey Ash 1347); transferred here 1354; dissolved 4 October 1366; Franciscan nuns — from Waterbeach, Cambridgeshire founded 1364-7 by Lionel, Duke of Clarence; dissolved 1359; granted to Nicholas Hare 1539	Brusyard Priory	
Bungay Priory ^{+}		Benedictine nuns founded 1183 by Roger de Glanvill and his wife, Countess Gundred; dissolved 1336; nuns appear to have abandoned the house before April 1536; granted to Thomas, Duke of Norfolk 1537/8; most of conventual buildings destroyed by fire 1688; rebuilt 1699; reopened 1701 for parochial use as the Parish Church of St Mary	The Priory Church of Saint Mary and the Holy Cross, Bungay	
Bury St Edmunds Abbey		Saxon (Benedictine?) monks founded 633 by Sigeberht, King of the East Angles; destroyed in raids by the Danes c.870 secular (collegiate) founded 903; refounded c.925, endowed by King Athelstan; Benedictine monks founded 1020-2; dissolved 4 November 1539; granted to John Eyre 1559/60; subsequently granted to Thomas Badyby; abbot's palace in use as a house until 1720; other buildings incorporated into houses 17th and 19th century: extant; remains now within a public park; (EH) episcopal diocesan Bury St Edmunds Cathedral in precinct	The Abbey Church of Saint Edmund, (Bury Saint Edmunds); Beordicsworth Abbey; Bury St Edmond Abbey	
Bury St Edmunds Greyfriars, earlier site		Franciscan Friars Minor, Conventual (under the Custody of Cambridge) foundation attempted 1233, but discouraged by the legate and monks of the Abbey; founded shortly after 22 June 1257: bull obtained from the Pope to establish their community; expelled by Abbey officials; re-established at a new site (see immediately below)		
Bury St Edmunds Greyfriars		Franciscan Friars Minor, Conventual (under the Custody of Cambridge) (previous, unsuccessful foundation at earlier site (see immediately above)); founded 1258, with the assistance of Henry III; Pope Urban IV ordered the friars to demolish their buildings; re-established at Babwell		
Butley Priory ^		Augustinian Canons Regular founded 1171 by Sir Ranulph de Glanvill; dissolved 1 March 1538; remains incorporated into later buildings	The Priory Church of the Blessed Virgin Mary, Butley; Butleigh Priory	
Campsey Ash Priory		Augustinian Canonesses founded c.1195 by Theobald de Valoines, who granted land to his sisters Joan (subsequently the first prioress) and Agnes; (also given as Benedictine); dissolved 1536; granted to Sir William Willoughby 1543/4; post-medieval house and barn occupy site	The Priory Church of Saint Mary, Campsey Ash; The Blessed Virgin Mary; Campsey Priory; Campess Priory	
Cavenham Preceptory		Knights Templar founded before 1311?; dissolved 1308-12(?)	Togrynd Preceptory; Caveham Preceptory; Coddenham Preceptory	
Chipley Priory ^{#}		Augustinian Canons Regular founded before 1291 (before 1235); dissolved 1468; annexed to the college of Stoke by Clare 1468; farmhouse occupies site, incorporating part of the west range of the monastic buildings, though no remains identifiably as early as 13th century	The Priory Church of the Blessed Virgin Mary, Chipley	
Clare Friary *		Augustinian Friars (under the Limit of Cambridge) founded 1248/9 by Richard de Clare, Earl of Gloucester and Hereford; cell dependent on Bec-Hellouin; reconstituted 1326 by Edward II as a cell dependent on Westminster, Middlesex; refounded as a college 1490 by Edmund, Earl of March dissolved 1538; granted to Richard Friend 1539/40; Augustinian Friars — from Ireland refounded 1953; extant; former infirmary/barn in use as friars' chapel	The Priory Church of Our Lady, Saint Peter and Saint Paul and Saint Augustine, Clare ____________________; Clare Priory	
Clare Priory		secular collegiate founded c.1045 Benedictine monks alien house: dependent on Bec-Hellouin; founded 1090: collegiate church of St John the Baptist granted to Bec by Gilbert de Clare; transferred to new site at Stoke by Clare		
Coddenham Camera		Knights Hospitaller a member of Battisford		
Coddenham Priory		Eustace de Merch originally intended to found a house of Cistercian nuns from Nun Appleton during the reign of Henry II; Augustinian Canons Regular dependent on Royston, Hertfordshire; founded before 1184 by Eustace de Merch, who granted the church to Royston; dissolved 1537	Covenham Priory	
Creeting St Mary Priory		Benedictine monks alien house: (probable) grange dependent on Bernay; founded before 1156; supervised by a prior from 1327; dissolved before 1414; granted to Eton College 1462		
Creeting St Olave Priory		Benedictine monks alien house: cell or grange, under supervision of a prior, dependent on Grestein; founded before 1087; monks have been suggested to have used the parish church of St Olave ^{#}; dissolved 1360; sold privately		
Dodnash Priory ^{#}		Augustinian Canons Regular founded c.1188 by Baldwin de Toeni and his mother Alda; dissolved 1525, suppressed for Cardinal Wolsey's colleges at Oxford and Ipswich; granted to Thomas Alverde; in use as a farmhouse 19th century; some of the re-used masonry incorporated into the buildings of Dodnash Priory Farm	The Priory Church of the Blessed Virgin Mary, Dodnash	
Dunwich Blackfriars		Dominican Friars (under the Visitation of Cambridge) founded before 1256 by Sir Roger de Holish; licence granted 1384 to move to Blythburgh due to threat of incursion by the sea; dissolved 1538; granted to John Eyre 1544/5; destroyed by coastal erosion and submerged by the sea		
Dunwich, Greyfriars, earlier site		Franciscan Friars Minor, Conventual (under the Custody of Cambridge) founded before 1277 (?before 1272: during the reign of Henry III) by Robert Fitz John; transferred to new site (see immediately below) 1290, due to coastal erosion		
Dunwich Greyfriars		Franciscan Friars Minor, Conventual (under the Custody of Cambridge) (community founded at earlier site (see immediately above) before 1277 (?before 1272)); transferred here due to coastal erosion 1290; dissolved 1538; surrendered to Ingworth, Bishop of Dover; granted to John Eyre		
Dunwich Preceptory		Knights Templar founded before 1199; dissolved 1308-12 passed to Knights Hospitaller, who maintained a chaplain but no preceptory here; destroyed by coastal erosion and submerged by the sea		
Dunwich Priory		Benedictine monks alien house: dependent on Eye (itself dependent on Bernay); founded after 1080, church granted to Eye by William the Conqueror; submerged by the sea between 1272 and 1307 (in/about the reign of Edward I)	St Felix?	
East Bergholt Abbey *		Benedictine nuns land purchased 1857; extant	The Abbey Church of Saint Mary, East Bergholt	
Edwardstone Priory ^{#}		Benedictine monks Priory cell dependent on Abingdon, Berkshire (Oxfordshire) founded 1114, church granted to Abingdon by Hubert de Monchesney, confirmed 1115; dissolved c.1160: community transferred to Earl's Colne by Abbot Walkelin	The Blessed Virgin Mary	
Eye Priory		Benedictine monks alien house: dependent on Bernay; founded c.1080 by Robert Malet; became denizen: independent, refounded c.1385; dissolved October 1534/1537	The Priory Church of Saint Peter, Eye	
Felixstowe Priory, possible earlier site		Benedictine monks Priory cell dependent on Rochester Cathedral, Kent; founded c.1105 (before 1107); church of St Felix granted to Rochester by Roger Bigod; possibly transferred from this site to a new location (see immediately below) 14th century		
Felixstowe Priory		Benedictine monks Priory cell dependent on Rochester Cathedral, Kent; founded c.1105 (before 1107) (possibly at earlier site (see immediately above)); church of St Felix granted to Rochester by Roger Bigod; absence of a church infers the monks used the parish church of St Mary dissolved 1538: suppressed for Wolsey's college at Ipswich (formal grant 30 December 1528); granted to the Duke of Norfolk on the suppression of Ipswich College; granted to Thomas Seckford (Sexford) 1576/7	Walton Priory; Walton, St Felix; Wilton St Felix Priory; Fylstowe Priory; Filstou Priory	
Flixton Priory ^?		Augustinian Canonesses founded 1258 by Marjory (Margery) Harnes, widow of Bartholomew de Crek (Clerk/Creke); dissolved 1537; granted to Richard Warton 1537; granted to John Tasburgh 1544; remains of conventual church possibly incorporated into Abbey Farmhouse, 16th/17th century	The Priory Church of the Blessed Virgin Mary and Saint Katharine, Flixton	
Gislingham Preceptory ^{#}		Knights Templar founded before 1228 by Sir Robert de Burgate; dissolved before 1308(?); destroyed 1338; granted to John Grene and Robert Hall 1553	Giselingham Preceptory	
Great Bricett Priory ^{+}		Augustinian Canons Regular alien house: dependent on St-Léonard-de-Noblat founded c.1110 (1114-9) by Ralph fitz Brien and his wife Emma; destroyed by fire 1416; apparently re-occupied; dissolved 1444(?); granted by Henry VI to his college in Cambridge; remains of conventual church incorporated into current parish church of SS Mary and Lawrence	The Priory Church of Saint Leonard, Bricett ____________________; Bricett Priory; Bresete Priory	(church)
Hadleigh Monastery		supposed Saxon monastery		
Hoxne Priory		Secular collegiate founded before 951 by Theodred, Bishop of London probably destroyed soon after; joint cathedral with North Elmham before 1040 to 1072?; Benedictine monks church of St Peter and chapel of St Edmund, King and Martyr granted to Norwich, Norfolk by Bishop Herbert Losinga 1101; chapel rebuilt, endowed and granted by Maurice of Windsor and his wife Egidis for a convent of monks 1130; dissolved 1538; granted to Richard Gresham 1546/7	Hoxon Priory	
Icanho Monastery ^{~}		Saxon Benedictine? monks (Note: Icanho — order: special rule approved by Benedict Biscop c.670: Victoria County History: A History of the County of Lincoln, Volume 2, (1906), p.96-7) founded 653-4 by St Botolph (Note: Icanho — foundation: Anglo-Saxon Chronicles, (ed. D. Whitelock &c, 1961), p.20, with note that it was located in East Anglia; T. H. Bryant, Churches of Suffolk, (1912), Volume 1, p.5, and F. S. Stevenson assert Iken in Suffolk. Full attribution by N. Scarfe, S. West and R. Cramp, 'Iken, St Botolph and the Coming of East Anglian Christianity', Proceedings of the Suffolk Institute of Archaeology & History xxxv (1984), 279-302.); destroyed in raids by the Danes c.870; also suggested to have been in Lincolnshire (Note: Icanho — location: Victoria County History: A History of the County of Lincoln, Volume 2, (1906), p.96-7 and T. Tanner, Notitia Monastica, p.248 suggest location was near Boston in Lincolnshire)	Ikanho Monastery; Iken Monastery	
Ipswich Austin Friars		Augustinian Friars founded during the reign of Henry III by Henry de Manesby and others; dissolved; granted to William Sabyne 1541/2		
Ipswich Blackfriars		Dominican Friars (under the Visitation of Cambridge) founded 1263; dissolved 1538		
Ipswich Greyfriars		Franciscan Friars Minor, Conventual (under the Custody of Cambridge) founded before 1236; dissolved 1535		
Ipswich — Holy Trinity Priory		Augustinian Canons Regular founded c.1133, endowed largely by Norman Gastrode fitz Eadnoth, one of the first canons, before 1177; dissolved 1537; destroyed by fire and rebuilt 1194, by the bishop of Norwich; dissolved 1537; granted to Sir Thomas Pope 1544/5	The Priory Church of the Holy Trinity, Ipswich; Christchurch	
Ss Peter & Paul Priory, Ipswich		Augustinian Canons Regular founded c.1190 (late in the reign of Henry II) by [the ancestors of] Thomas Lacy and his wife Alice; dissolved May 1528, suppressed for Wolsey's college at Ipswich; granted to Richard Percival and Edmund Duffield 1611/2	The Priory Church of Saint Peter and Saint Paul, Ipswich	
Ipswich Priory		Augustinian Canons Regular founded during the reign of William the Conqueror by Gilbert Blund; dissolved; granted to Richard Codington 1538/9		
Ipswich Whitefriars		Carmelite Friars founded before c.1271 (1278); rededicated 1477 after a probable major rebuild; dissolved 1538; granted to John Eyre 1544/5		
Ixworth Priory, earlier site		possible early projection c.1100 either failed or lapsed; Augustinian Canons Regular founded c.1170 by a member of the Blunt family destroyed during civil warfare;	The Priory Church of the Blessed Virgin Mary, Ixworth	
Ixworth Priory ^		Augustinian Canons Regular founded c.1170, on a different site from the original foundation; dissolved 1537; remains incorporated into house named 'Ixworth Abbey' built on site	The Priory Church of the Blessed Virgin Mary, Ixworth; Ixworth Abbey	
Kersey Priory ^		hospital founded 1218 by Thomas de Burgh; Augustinian Canons Regular founded before 1219; dissolved 1443-4; granted to SS Mary and Nicholas, Cambridge (afterwards King's College, Cambridge) (1533/4?)	The Priory Church of the Blessed Virgin Mary and Saint Anthony, Kersey	
Lavenham Priory ^		Benedictine monks converted into mansion latterly open to public, now hotel accommodation		
Leiston Abbey ^		Premonstratensian Canons from Welbeck Abbey, Nottinghamshire (community founded at Old Leiston 1183); transferred here 1365; dissolved 1536; granted to Charles Brandon, Duke of Suffolk 1537; parts of the conventual church incorporated into later buildings; remains incorporated into house named 'Abbey House' built on site 17th century; (EH)	Leyestone Abbey	
Letheringham Priory		Augustinian Canons Regular dependent on SS Peter & Paul, Ipswich; founded c.1194 by William de Bovile; dissolved 1537; granted to Elizabeth Naunton, daughter of Sir Antony Naunton of Wingfield 1553;	The Priory Church of the Blessed Virgin Mary, Letheringham; Letherington Priory	
Little Welnetham Priory		Trinitarian		
Mendham Priory		Cluniac monks alien house: dependent on Castle Acre Priory, Norfolk; founded before 1155 by William Huntingfield; became denizen: independent from sometime between 1351 and 1374; dissolved 1537; granted to Richard Freston	All Saints; Mindham Priory	
Old Leiston Abbey		Premonstratensian Canons daughter house of Welbeck Abbey, Nottinghamshire; founded 1183 by Sir Ranulph de Glanvil; obtained licence from pope Urban V to move to another site due to flooding; transferred to new site at Leiston 1365; old site continued in use as a cell	The Blessed Virgin Mary	
Orford Austin Friars		Augustinian Friars (under the Limit of Cambridge) founded 1295-9, land granted by Robert Hewell 1205, building appears to have begun 1299; dissolved December 1538		
Redlingfield Priory ^		Benedictine nuns founded c.1120 by Manasses, Count of Giusnes (Ghisnes) and his wife Emma; dissolved 10 February 1537; granted to Edmund Bedingfield 1536/7; house rebuilt 1875; monastic remains incorporated into barn	The Priory Church of the Blessed Virgin Mary and Saint Andrew, Redlingfield	
Ringshall Cell (?)		Benedictine monks purportedly a cell (Note: Ringsford — given as cell: W. A. Dutt (1905) Suffolk:); free chapel belonging to Norwich granted to Hoxne		
Rumburgh Priory ^{+}		possible site of Saxon minster or monastery, 11th century; Benedictine monks Priory dependent on St. Benet's Abbey, Norfolk founded between 1047 (Note: Rumburgh — earliest date for foundation: Æthelmær became bishop of Elmham 1047) and 1064 (Note: Rumburgh — latest date for foundation: Thurston was abbot until 1064 at latest) by Æthelmær, Bishop of Elmham and Thurston, Abbot of St Benet of Hulme and Oxenedes possibly subsequently dependent on St Mélanie, Rennes; cell dependent on St Mary's Abbey, York, York c.1137: granted to York by Stephen, Earl of Brittany 1135; dissolved 1528; suppressed for Wolsey's college at Ipswich; conventual church in parochial use as the Parish Church of St Michael	ThePriory Church of Saint Michael and Saint Felix, Rumburgh; Wisseta Priory	
St. Olaves Priory, Herringfleet		Augustinian Canons Regular founded c.1216 by Roger fitz Osbert; dissolved 1537; purchased by Sir Henry Jerningham, who built house on site 1547, incorporating monastic remains; demolished 1784, and stone removed to repair Herringfleet church; refectory undercroft converted to a cottage 1825 in use until 1902	The Priory Church of Saint Olave, Heringfleet St Mary and St Olave, King and Martyr (Note: St Olave — dedication given by T. Tanner, (1744) Notitia Monastica); Herringfleet Priory	
Sibton Abbey		Cistercian monks from Warden Abbey, Bedfordshire founded 22 February 1150 (1149) by William de Cayneto (Cheyney); dissolved 1536; granted to Thomas Howard, Duke of Norfolk; sold to John Scrivener 1610; house built on the site, demolished later 18th century; site currently within the estate of 19th century house named 'Sibton Abbey', without public access	The Abbey Church of Saint Mary, Sibton Abbey	
Snape Priory ^{#}		Benedictine monks cell dependent on St John's Abbey Colchester, Essex founded 1155 by William Martel, his wife and son; dependent on Butley, granted by Henry VIII; dissolved 19 January 1525; Abbey Farm possibly occupies the site, though buildings appear not to incorporate monastic remains	St Mary	
South Elmham Monastery		apparent religious centre 7th century (Note: South Elmham Monastery — Victoria County History: A History of the County of Suffolk, Volume 2, p.215; cf Taylor)		
Stoke by Clare Priory		Benedictine monks alien house: dependent on Bec-Hellouin Abbey; (community founded at Clare before 1090); transferred here 1124 from Clare; dissolved 1415; became a secular college; enlarged 1897 by Lutyens; dissolved 1548, converted into a mansion; present house currently in use as a school named 'Stoke College'; church rebuilt and in parochial use as the Parish Church of St John the Baptist;		(church)
Stoke-by-Nayland Monastery (?)		monks or secular college founded before 946 (?) possibly during the reign of King Edmund by Alfgar who left bequest to the community of Stoke; land granted to Ely by King Edgar		
BlackFriars, Sudbury		Dominican Friars (under the Visitation of Cambridge) founded before 1247 by Baldwin de Shipling; dissolved 1539; granted to Thomas Eden, Esq. 1539/40 demolished for a residential house; 'Priory Wall' is sleeper wall of 'Priory Gate', built shortly before dissolution		
Sudbury Augustinian Priory ^{#}		Augustinian Canons Regular		
Sudbury Benedictine Priory ^{#}		Benedictine monks cell dependent on Westminster Abbey Middlesex; founded c.1115 by Wilfric; chapel built early-15th century, but monastic buildings appear not to have been built; dissolved c.1538; granted to the Dean and Chapter of Westminster 1542/3; Priory house demolished 1779	St Bartholomew's Chapel	
Wangford Priory		Cluniac monks cell dependent on Thetford Priory, Norfolk; founded before 1160 by Doudo Asini; became denizen: independent from sometime between 1376 and 1393; granted to Thomas, Duke of Norfolk 1540/1; last remains demolished 19th century		
Welnetham Crutched Friars		Crutched Friars dependent on London, Middlesex; chapel of St Thomas Martyr granted to London; founded before 1274; dissolved 1538		
Wherstead Priory		uncertain order and foundation; alleged 13th century monastery at Wervestede		(alleged)
Wickham Skeyth Priory		Benedictine monks dependent on St. John's Abbey, Colchester, Essex; founded after 1135 (early in the reign of Stephen) by Robert de Salchovilla (Sakeville), later a monk at Colchester; dissolved c.1164, transferred to Colchester by consent of Jordan, son of the founder	Wickham Skeith Priory	
Woodbridge Priory		Augustinian Canons Regular founded c.1193 by Ernald Rufus (Ernaldus Ruffus); dissolved 1534/7; granted to Thomas Seckford, Master of Requests 1576/7; building constructed on site 1547-64, now in use as school known as 'the Abbey'	The Blessed Virgin Mary	
Yenston Grange		Benedictine monks alien house: grange dependent on St-Sever; foundation and dissolution unknown		

== See also ==
- List of monastic houses in England
