= Sudbury Priory (disambiguation) =

Sudbury Priory is a former Dominican priory in Sudbury, Suffolk, England.

Sudbury Priory may also refer to:

- Sudbury Benedictine Priory, a former Benedictine priory in Sudbury, Suffolk
- Sudbury Priory, a house in Sudbury, London

== See also ==
- Clare Priory, an Augustinian priory some 9 miles (14 km) from Sudbury, Suffolk
- Sudbury College, a former religious community in Sudbury, Suffolk
