= Jack-in-the-box =

Children's toy

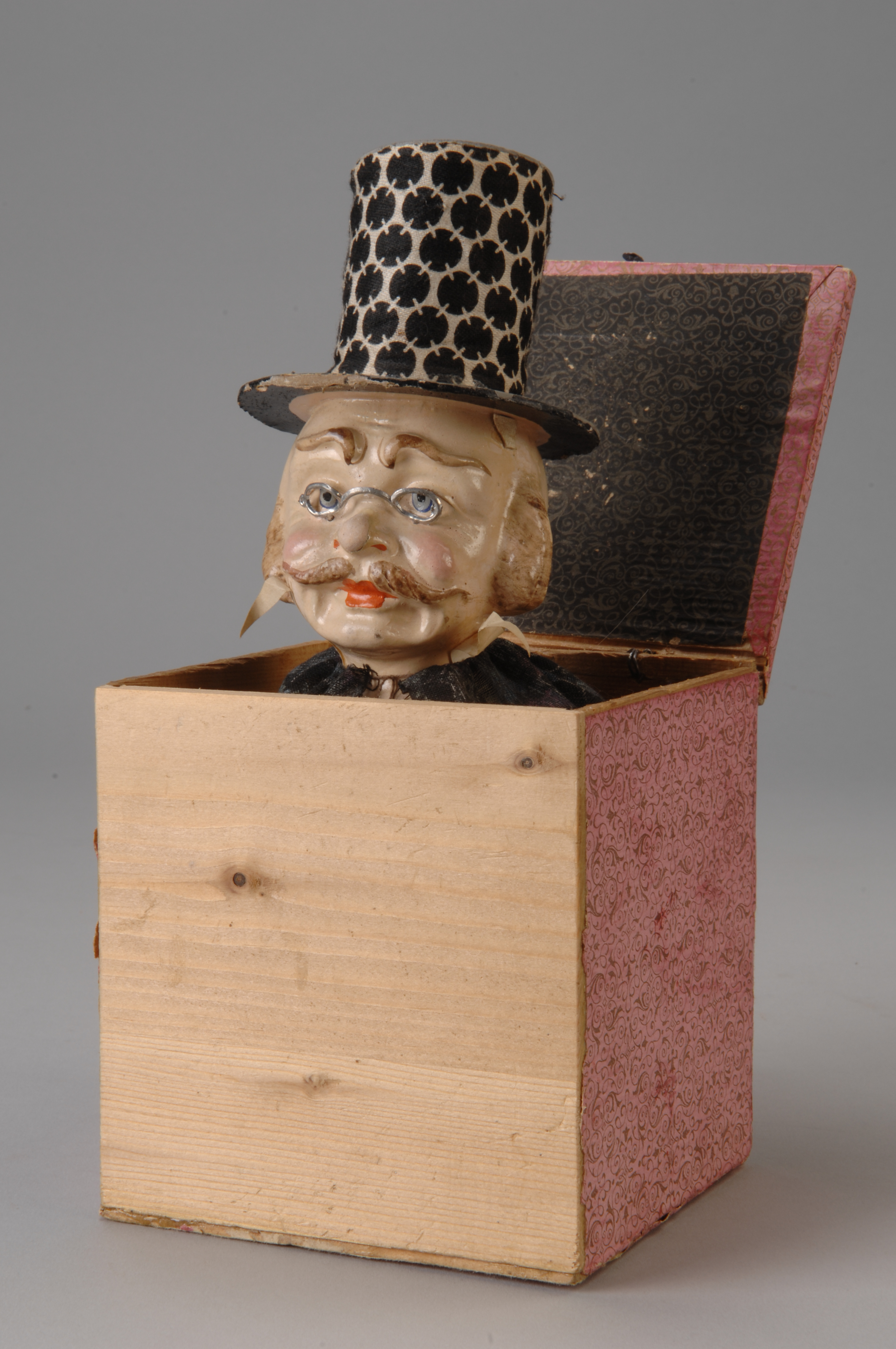
Early 20th century Dutch jack-in-the-box

A jack-in-the-box is a children's toy that outwardly consists of a music box with a crank. When the crank is turned, a music box mechanism in the toy plays a melody. After the crank has been turned a sufficient number of times (such as at the end of the melody), the lid pops open and a figure, usually a clown or jester, pops out of the box. Some jacks-in-the-box open at random times when cranked, making the startle even more effective. Many of those that use "Pop Goes the Weasel" open at the point in the melody when the word "pop" would be sung.

In 2005, the jack-in-the-box was inducted into the U.S. National Toy Hall of Fame, where are displayed all types of versions of the toy, starting from the beginning versions, and ending with the most recently manufactured versions.

== Origin ==
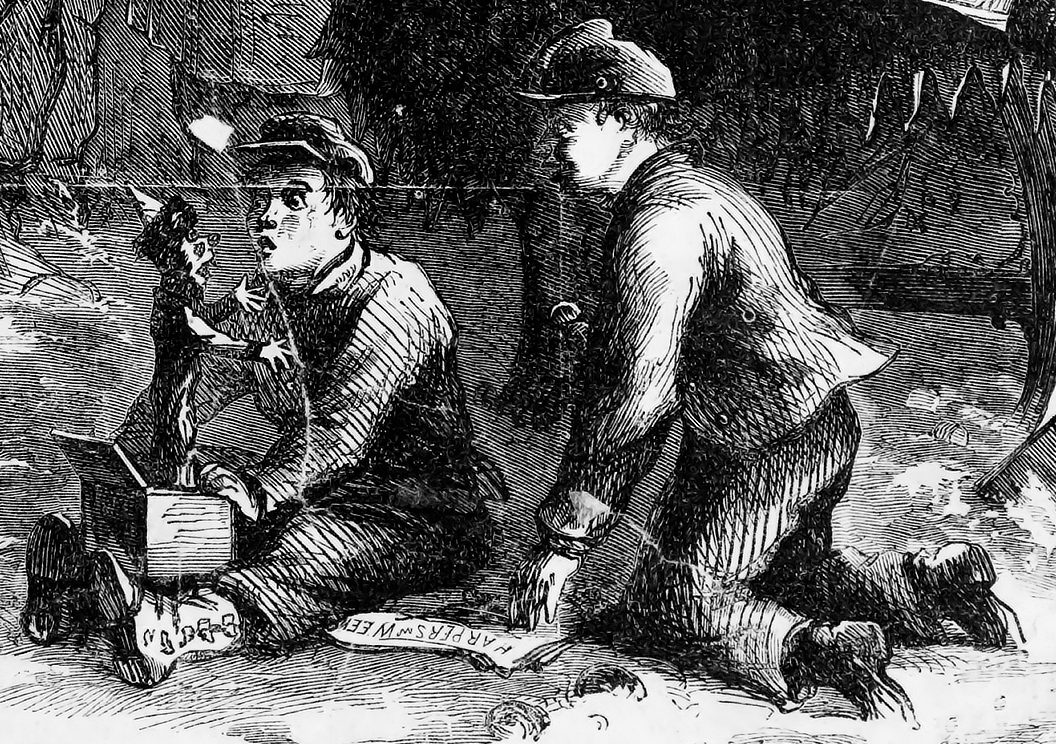
Two boys playing with a jack-in-the-box in an 1863 illustration

The term jack-in-the-box is derived from the name Jack used to mean "person", (Note: Somewhat akin to the modern term "guy".) and was also previously used for a type of swindler.

A theory as to the origin of the jack-in-the-box is that it comes from the 14th-century English prelate Sir John Schorne, who is often pictured holding a boot with a devil in it. According to folklore, he once cast the devil into a boot to protect the village of North Marston in Buckinghamshire. In French, a jack-in-the-box is called a "diable en boîte" (literally "devil in a box"). The phrase jack-in-the-box was first seen used in literature by John Foxe, in his book Actes and Monuments, first published in 1563. There he used the term as an insult to describe a swindler who would cheat tradesmen by selling them empty boxes instead of what they actually purchased. It also featured in the Chronicle of the Greyfriars of London in 1547 where it was noted as being used pejoratively to refer to the real presence of Christ in the Eucharist:

Also this same tyme was moche spekyng agayne the sacrament of the auter, that some callyd it Jacke of the boxe, with divers other shamfulle names

— Chronicle of the Greyfriars of London

== History ==
In the early 1500s, the first jack-in-the-box was made by a German clockmaker known as Claus. Claus built a wooden box, with metal edges and a handle that would pop out an animated devil or "Jack" after cranking the handle. It was built as a gift for a local prince's fifth birthday. After seeing this toy, other nobles requested their own "Devils-in-a-box" for their children.

In the early 18th century, improved toy mechanisms made the jack-in-the-box more widely available for all children and not just royalty.

== Models ==
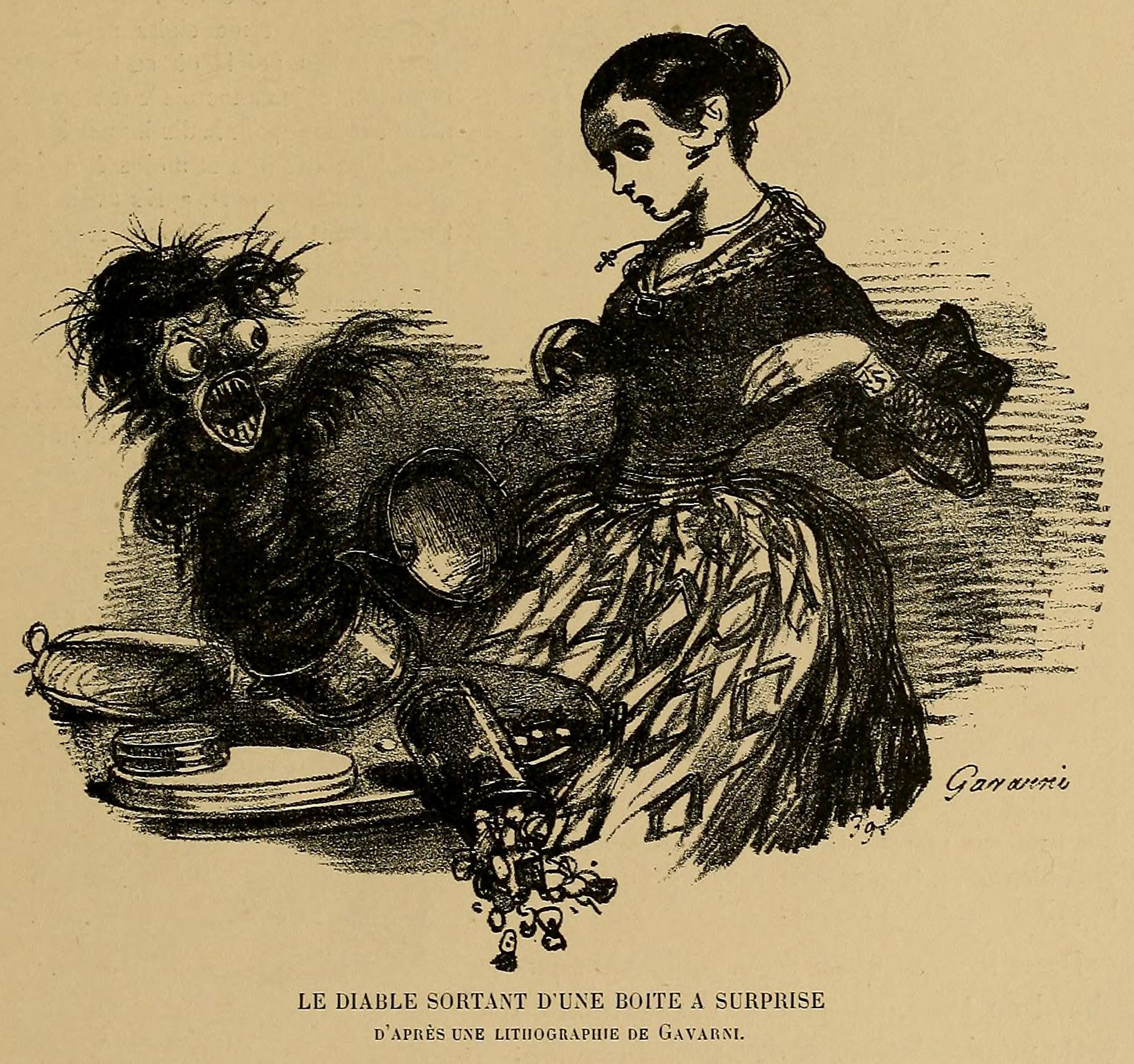
Jack-in-the-box after Paul Gavarni

Originally, the jack-in-the-box was made out of wood, but with new technology the toy could be constructed from printed cardboard. Around the 1930s, the jack-in-the-box became a wind-up toy made from tin. Additionally, the rare, contemporary ones would play songs other than Pop Goes the Weasel, such as Brahms’s Lullaby, Twinkle Twinkle Little Star, Rock-a-bye Baby and more. Over the years, the jack-in-the-box has evolved into characters other than the clown, such as Winnie the Pooh, The Cat in the Hat, the Three Little Pigs, generic kittens, generic dogs, Curious George, Santa Claus, generic giraffes, Mickey Mouse and so on.

== Distributors ==
Starting in 1935 and continuing for 20 years, the first company to take on the distribution of the toy was a very small firm named Joy Toy. The company is located in Italy as well as the Netherlands. Since then, Fisher-Price, Chad Valley, Mattel and Tomy have all played a major role in distributing the jack-in-the-box.

== In popular culture ==
- The jack-in-the-box has been used for centuries by cartoonists as a way to describe and poke fun at politicians.
- The American fast food company Jack in the Box began using the toy and the phrase as their mascot in the early 1950s.
- A 1945 Disney cartoon called The Clock Watcher shows Donald Duck making many failed attempts to close a jack-in-the-box.
