= St Gregory's Church, Sudbury =

Church in Sudbury, Suffolk

Coordinates: 52.040211°N 0.725948°E

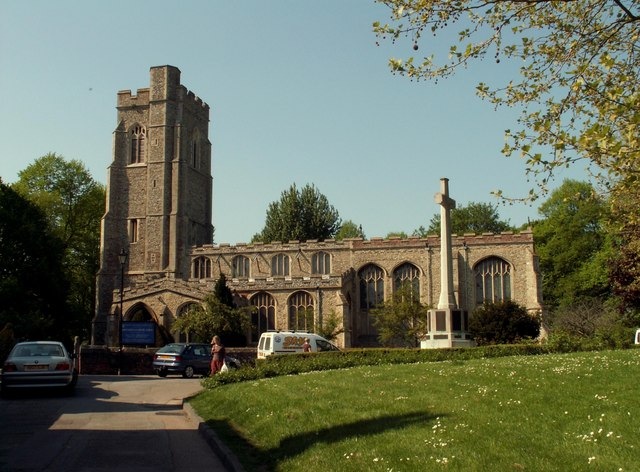
- View of St Gregory's Church from the south
- St Gregory's Church, Sudbury
- Location: Gregory Street, Sudbury, Suffolk CO10 1BA
- Country: England
- Denomination: Church of England
- Website: https://www.stgregorychurchsudbury.co.uk/

History
- Status: Active
- Founded: Before 970 AD
- Dedication: Gregory the Great

Architecture
- Functional status: Parish church
- Heritage designation: Grade I listed
- Designated: 3 March 1952
- Style: Perpendicular Gothic
- Years built: c. 1370-1500

Administration
- Diocese: St Edmundsbury & Ipswich
- Archdeaconry: Sudbury

Clergy
- Rector: Cheryl Collins

The Church of St Gregory, Sudbury is a Church of England parish church, located in the town of Sudbury in Suffolk, England. First mentioned in the 10th century, most of the present building dates from the 14th and 15th centuries. The church famously possesses the head of Archbishop Simon Sudbury, who was beheaded by rebels during the Peasants' Revolt in 1381. It is a Grade I listed building.

== History ==
The first recorded mention of St Gregory's Church is in two wills dated 970 and 993, although it seems probable that a church was in existence at Sudbury in 797 when Ælfhun, the Bishop of Dunwich, died while visiting the town. The church is also mentioned in the Domesday Book of 1086 which says that "The church of St. Gregory holds fifty acres of land in free tenure, as the men of the Hundred say, and thirty-six acres of meadow".

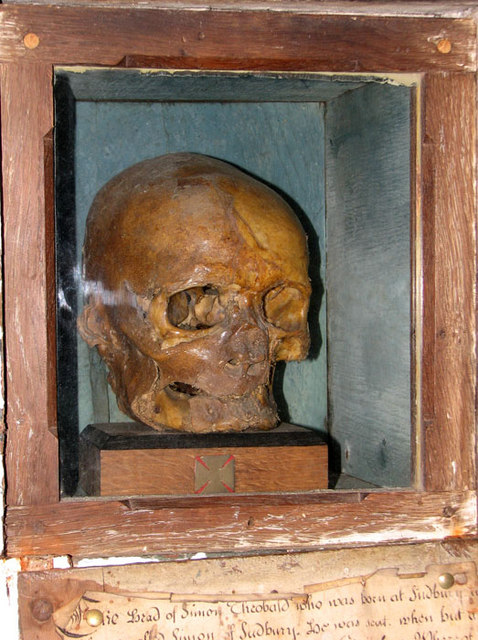
The mummified head of Archbishop Simon Sudbury, preserved in a niche in the vestry.

The present church building is in the Perpendicular Gothic style dating from the 14th and 15th centuries. The aisles are believed to have been rebuilt by Archbishop Simon Sudbury in about 1370; it is known that he founded a college adjacent to the church in 1375, and that a window inscription (now lost) stated that Simon had built the chapel at the east end of the north aisle in 1365. Archbishop Sudbury was beheaded by rebels during the Peasants' Revolt in 1381 because of his involvement with the poll tax; his mummified head was brought to the church, and is kept in a niche in the vestry wall.

Before the English Reformation, the church contained an image of the Virgin Mary, known as "Our Lady of Sudbury", to which Queen Elizabeth of York sent a cash offering in 1502; another image of Saint Christopher, destroyed in 1531, is commemorated by the Christopher Inn pub in Gainsborough Street. There was also a rood screen, three wooden panels from which have survived. Extensive medieval stained glass in the church was destroyed by William Dowsing and other Parliamentarians in 1643 during the First English Civil War, who recorded that in "Gregory Parish, Sudbury; we brake down ten mighty great angels in glass, in all eighty".

By 1860, the fabric of the building had deteriorated to such an extent that the church had to be closed. William Butterfield was appointed to undertake the restoration work, completed in 1862, which was remarkably sympathetic for that era.

The church became a Grade I listed building in 1952.

In March 2011 a CT scan of Sudbury's head was performed at the West Suffolk Hospital to make a facial reconstruction, which was completed in September 2011 by forensics expert Adrienne Barker at the University of Dundee. A copy of the reconstruction is on permanent display in St Gregory's.

=== Sudbury College ===
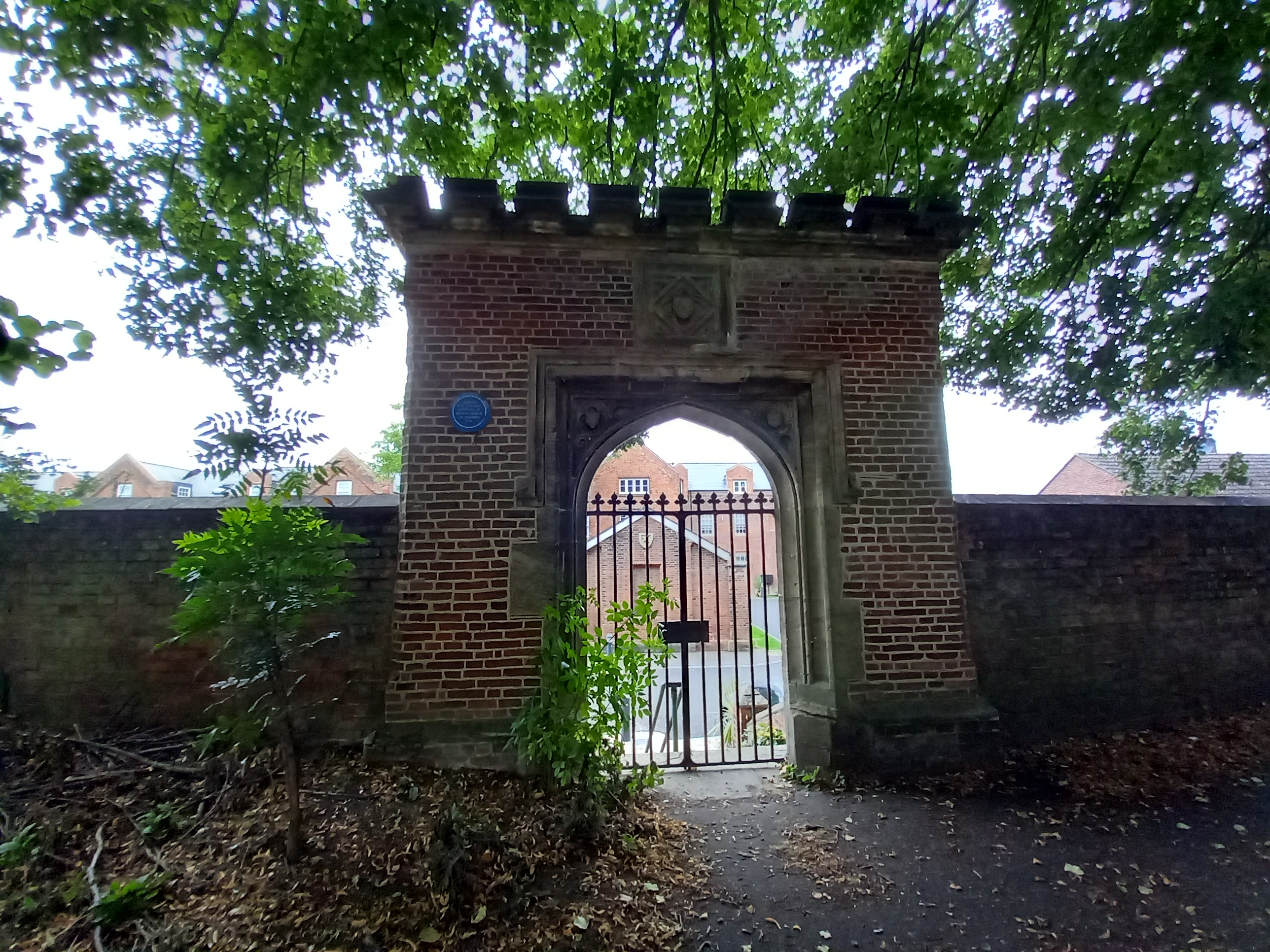
The gateway in the churchyard of St Gregory's is the only remnant of Sudbury College and is a Grade II Listed Building.

In 1374, Simon Sudbury and his brother, John of Chertsy, founded a college, a residence for six secular canons who were priests serving the churches of St Gregory and St Peter, its chapel of ease. The college building was situated on 3 acres (1.2 ha) of land adjacent to St Gregory's churchyard, believed to have been the site of the house of Nigel Theobald, the father of Simon and John. The senior canon held the office of warden of the college; one warden was William Wood, who died in 1491 and in his will left a house and endowment for the founding of Sudbury Grammar School.

By 1526 the college, although still functioning, was in a state of disrepair and the canons were constantly arguing amongst themselves; the warden, who was over 80 years old, was frequently absent. In 1538, the college was dissolved and surrendered to the crown by the last warden, Richard Eden. In 1544, the king granted the college estate to Sir Thomas Paston for the sum of £1,280, although he seems never to have lived there. After passing through numerous hands, it was eventually purchased by the Borough of Sudbury for use as a workhouse and the remaining medieval fabric was demolished in 1836 to make way for a more suitable building. Only the heavily restored gateway survives, standing on the west side of the churchyard; it is a Grade II listed building.

== Description ==
=== Building ===
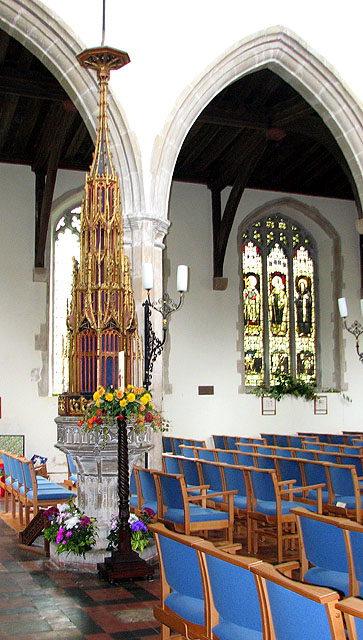
The 12-foot tall 15th-century font cover.

The church is flint faced, with a bell tower at the western end, which has a stair turret to the southeast. The nave has a clerestory and a 14th-century arcade of four bays, the capitals on the south side being simpler and perhaps earlier. The large chancel has tall Perpendicular windows. A large south porch has an attached chapel on its eastern side. The brick-built vestry at the eastern end of the church dates from the early 16th century.

=== Woodwork ===
The exceptionally tall and elaborate font cover, dating from the 15th century, was described by Nikolaus Pevsner as "One of the finest medieval font covers in the country". The lowest section of the 12-foot (3.7 m) tall cover was adapted in the 19th century to telescope upwards, so as to avoid having to lift the whole edifice in order to use the font. The choir stalls have carved heads on the arm rests and misericords under the seats. Two panels from the former rood screen have been incorporated into the stall backs, but were over-painted during the Victorian restoration; an unrestored panel displayed at the west end of the church, depicts the legend of John Schorne, the Rector of North Marston, conjuring the Devil into a boot.

=== Monuments ===
Tombs in the church include a stone slab believed to be the tomb of Nigel and Sara Theobald, the parents of Simon Sudbury, and another, thought to be that of Thomas Jane, the Bishop of Norwich, who was buried at St Gregory's in 1500. A slab in the south aisle has an inscription in Anglo-Norman French which translates as "Here lies Seive de St. Quintin formerly the wife of Robert de St. Quintin who died in the year of Grace 1300 on the day of St. Gregory. Pray for her soul".

A chest tomb for Thomas Carter, who died in 1706, has a Latin inscription that reads: "Traveller, I will relate a wondrous thing. On the day which the aforesaid Thomas Carter breathed his last, a Sudbury camel passed through the eye of a needle, if thou hast wealth, go do likewise. Farewell".

=== Organ ===
The pipe organ is located in a former chapel, once dedicated to All Souls, at the east end of the north aisle. Two earlier organs from St Peter's Church, Sudbury, were apparently sold on to St Gregory's; the first being by John Snetzler dating from about 1750 and installed at St Gregory's in 1841, and its replacement by Samuel Parsons was sold to St Gregory's in 1866 for £100. The present organ was built and installed in 1879 by the London firm of Bishop and Son. The instrument has recently been cleaned and had the bellows restored, again by Bishop's; fund-raising is ongoing to restore a disused "clarinet" stop.

=== Bells ===
The church originally had a ring of six bells; two further treble bells were added in 1785, both cast from an old bell from Sudbury Priory. The tenor bell was recast in 1774 by Pack and Chapman at the Whitechapel Bell Foundry in the East End of London, while all the other bells were recast in 1821 by Thomas Mears, also at Whitechapel. The church has an active team of bell ringers, who are currently raising funds for a complete restoration of the bells.
