= John Schorne =

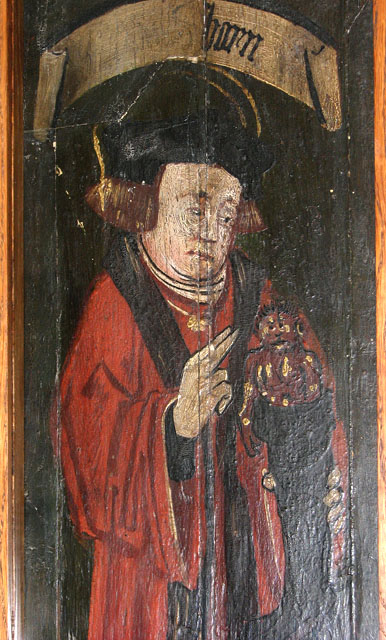
A medieval depiction of John Schorne, casting the devil into a boot. From a rood screen panel in St Gregory's Church, Sudbury.

Sir John Schorne (died 1313) was rector of North Marston in the English county of Buckinghamshire. He was a very pious man and was said to have effected many miraculous cures for gout and toothaches.

During a drought, he discovered a well, whose waters were reputed to have miraculous properties. His reputation for holiness was such that he is believed to have cast the devil into a boot. He is often pictured holding a boot with a devil in it, which was thought to be the origin of the children's jack-in-the-box toy. However, the toy did not come about until over 500 years after Schorne's time.

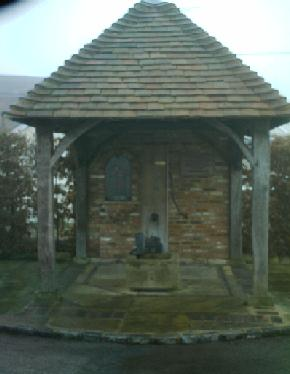
The Schorne Well at North Marston, in Schorne Lane

When he died, his shrine in the church at North Marston became a popular place of pilgrimage and he was regarded by many as a saint, although he was never canonised. His remains were later moved to St George's Chapel, Windsor, the burial place of English monarchs. Henry VIII, who was buried there, went on pilgrimage to Schorne's Well in July 1511 and May 1521. The Holy Well was renovated in 2004/2005 and may still be seen in North Marston.

There was a rector in Princes Risborough in Buckinghamshire called John de Schorne, circa 1289, according to the list of rectors in the front of the parish register. It is likely to be the same person, though this is difficult to confirm for certain.

One of the two team benefices in Claydon Deanery is named after Schorne to this day.

== See also ==
- Stingy Jack
