= Sudbury Town Hall =

Municipal building in Sudbury, Suffolk, England

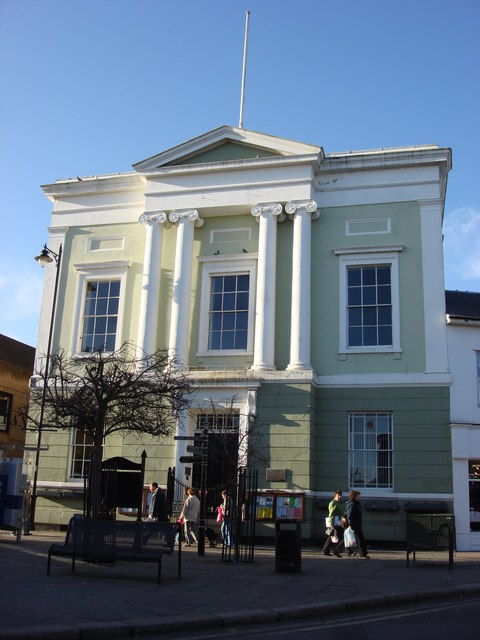
- Sudbury Town Hall

- Shown in Suffolk
- 52.0390°N 0.7314°E
- Location: Gaol Lane, Sudbury

History
- Built: 1830

Site notes
- Architect: John Johnston
- Architectural style: Neoclassical style

Listed Building – Grade II
- Official name: Town Hall
- Designated: 3 March 1952
- Reference no.: 1037452

Sudbury Town Hall is a municipal building in Gaol Lane in Sudbury, Suffolk, England. The building, which was the headquarters of Sudbury Borough Council, is a Grade II listed building.

== History ==
Following the passing of the Sudbury improvement bill, which received royal assent on 20 May 1825, the new town commissioners decided to procure a new town hall: the site they selected had been occupied by the Exchequer Inn.

Construction work on the new building started in 1828. It was designed by John Johnston in the neoclassical style, built in red brick with a stucco rendering by Thomas Ginn at a cost of £2,500 and completed in June 1830. The design involved a symmetrical main frontage with three bays facing the top of Market Hill; the central bay, which slightly projected forward at ground floor level, featured a doorway flanked by brackets which supported a cornice. On the first floor, there was a sash window flanked by pairs of Ionic order columns supporting and an entablature and a pediment which originally contained a coat of arms in the tympanum. Internally, the principal rooms on the ground floor were the courtroom, in which the quarterly assizes were held and the mayor's parlour; there was a large assembly room on the first floor. A gaol, large enough to hold four prisoners awaiting trial, was established at the rear of the town hall.

Following significant population growth, partly associated with the expansion of the local silk weaving industry, the area became a municipal borough with the town hall as its headquarters in 1892. The 1st Battalion, the Suffolk Regiment received the freedom of the borough from the mayor, Councillor C. E. Grimwood, at a ceremony in front of the town hall attended by the Lord Lieutenant of Suffolk, the Earl of Stradbroke, on 29 April 1953. The building continued to serve as the meeting place of Sudbury Borough Council for much of the 20th century but ceased to be the local seat of government when Babergh District Council was formed in 1974. A tourist information centre was subsequently established in the building, and the assembly room became the regular meeting place for Sudbury Town Council.

The gaol at the back of the town hall was converted into a heritage centre in 2006 and six silk wall hangings made and donated by local silk weaving companies were hung in the assembly room in 2011. After the tourist information centre moved from the town hall to the public library on Market Hill, the heritage centre took over the room that had been vacated and installed a digital touch-screen system for the use of visitors in 2015. The room was then taken over by the district council for use as a customer advice centre in 2017, but fell vacant again when the customer advice centre also moved to the public library in spring 2021.

Works of art in the town hall include a painting by Robert Burrows depicting cattle watering and a painting by George Washington Brownlow depicting a moorhen's nest.
