= Joel Willans =

British copywriter, digital marketer and author

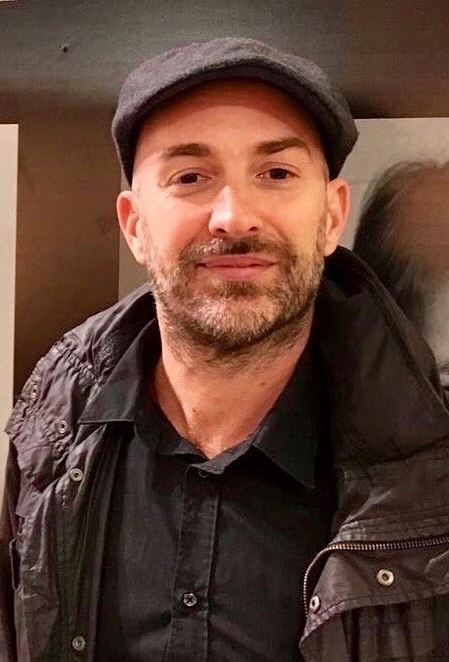
Joel Willans at Helsinki Book Fair, 2018

Joel Willans (born 11 May 1972 in Sudbury, Suffolk in Great Britain) is a British copywriter and author. He moved to Finland in 2002 with his Finnish girlfriend, now his wife.

== Biography ==
Before moving to Finland, Willans spent his early adult life studying history at University of Greenwich in London, working in the advertising business and writing short stories.

In Finland, Willans worked as a copywriter before founding an ad agency with his wife. The couple also have two children.

== Work ==
Willans’ first book, Spellbound – Stories of Women's Magic over Men, was published in England in 2013. The book's short stories describe men falling in love with women.

The second book, 101 Very Finnish Problems – The Foreigner's Guide to Surviving in Finland, was published in 2017 by Gummerus. The work is a collection of short, causerie-style essays, which use a humorous tone to describe Finnish culture from an outside point of view.

Willans based this second book on his Facebook page, Very Finnish Problems, which publishes image memes on Finland to a major audience. Peculiarities in Finnish culture, nature, geography etc. are humorously described as "problems". Across different social media, the Very Finnish Problems brand has more than 650,000 followers. Gummerus published a sequel, More Very Finnish Problems – An Even More Essential Guide To Surviving in Finland, in 2018, in which Willans explores his observations on Finnish culture with added depth, while adding illustrations from his social media accounts.

In both his writing and interviews by media, Willans tends to discuss what he sees as a contrast between positive aspects of Nordic life, compared to the deep-rooted yet "shallow" class system of British society.

In Great Britain, some of Willans’ short stories have been awarded the Yeovil Literary Prize and been read on BBC Radio Somerset.

Willans’ company also publishes a podcast titled Very Finnish Problems, on the Ink Tank web publication.
