= Sudbury, Suffolk =

Town in Suffolk, England

Coordinates: 52.0417°N 0.72816°E

Sudbury
- Town and civil parish
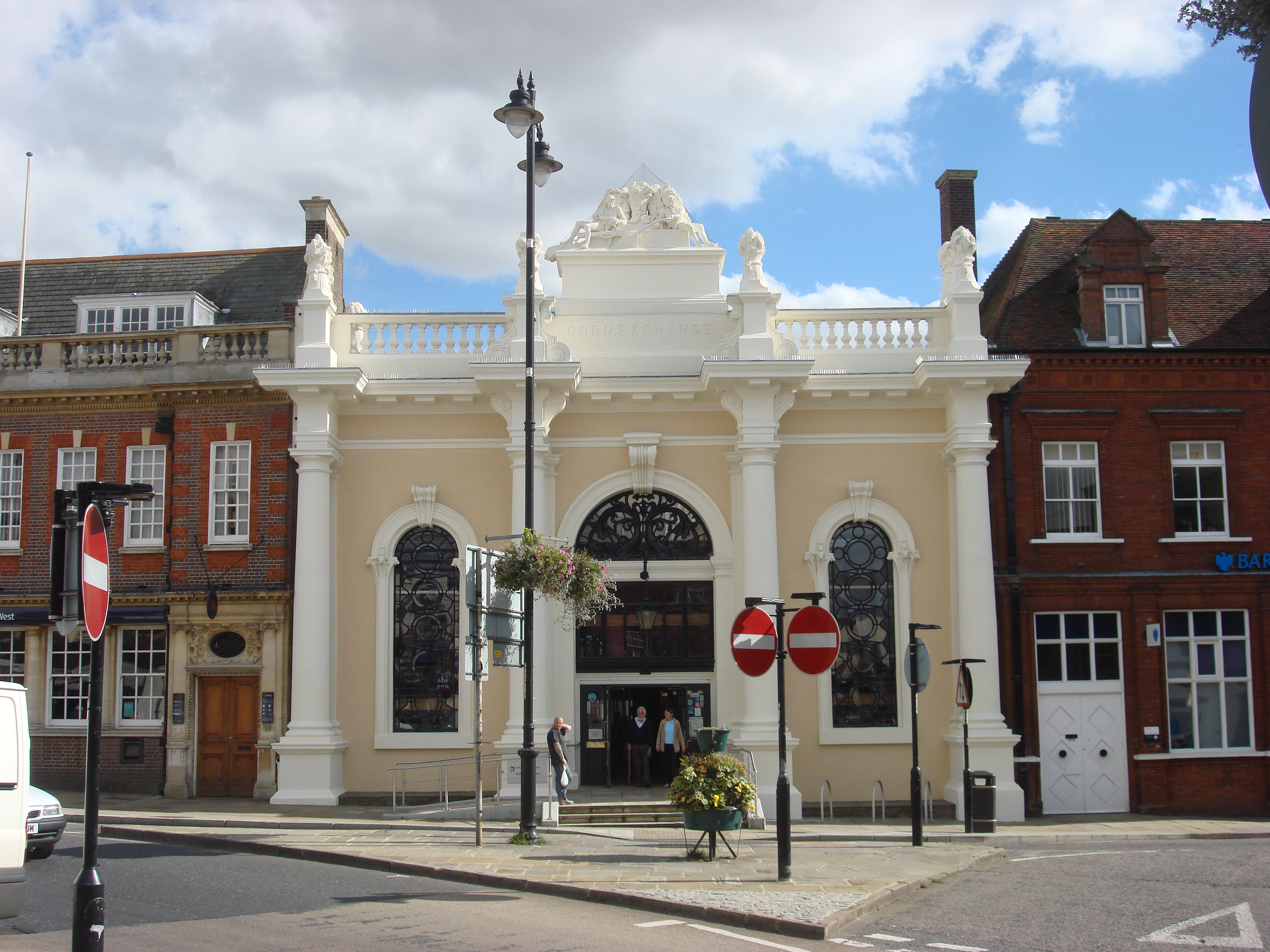
- The Corn Exchange

- Location within Suffolk
- Area: 7.013 km^{2} (2.708 sq mi)
- Population: 23,912 (2021 census)
  - Density: 3,410/km^{2} (8,800/sq mi)
- OS grid reference: TL8741
- Civil parish: Sudbury
- District: Babergh
- Shire county: Suffolk
- Region: East
- Country: England
- Sovereign state: United Kingdom
- Post town: SUDBURY
- Postcode district: CO10
- Dialling code: 01787
- Police: Suffolk
- Fire: Suffolk
- Ambulance: East of England
- UK Parliament: South Suffolk

Sudbury (/ˈsʌdbəri/, locally /ˈsʌbəri/) is a market town and civil parish in the south west of Suffolk, England, on the River Stour near the Essex border, 60 miles (97 km) north-east of London. It is the largest town in the Babergh local government district and part of the South Suffolk constituency. In 2021, the built-up area had a population of 23,912 and the parish had a population of 13,619.

Sudbury was an Anglo-Saxon settlement from the end of the 8th century, and its market was established in the early 11th century. Its textile industries prospered in the Late Middle Ages, the wealth of which funded many of its buildings and churches. The town became notable for its art in the 18th century, being the birthplace of Thomas Gainsborough, whose landscapes offered inspiration to John Constable, another Suffolk painter of the surrounding Stour Valley area. The 19th century saw the arrival of the railway with the opening of a station on the historic Stour Valley Railway, and Sudbury railway station forms the current terminus of the Gainsborough Line. In World War II, US Army Air Forces bombers operated from RAF Sudbury.

Today, Sudbury retains its status as a market town with a twice-weekly market in the town centre in front of St Peter's Church, which is now a cultural venue for events such as concerts and exhibitions. In sport, the town has a semi-professional football club, A.F.C. Sudbury, which competes at the seventh level of the football pyramid.

It is home to the Gainsborough's House museum, celebrating the work of the artist.

== History ==
=== Early history ===
Sudbury's history dates back into the age of the Saxons. The town's earliest mention is in circa 799, when Ælfhun, Bishop of Dunwich, died in the town. The Anglo-Saxon Chronicle records the town as Suðberie ("south-borough"), presumed to distinguish it from Norwich or Bury St Edmunds, to the north, and c. 995 is recorded as Suðbyrig. The town is also mentioned in the Domesday Book of 1086, as a market town where the local people came to barter their goods. The market was established in 1009. During this period the town was surrounded by a defensive ditch and a diverted section of the River Stour.

The Church of All Saints was established in the 12th century before being bought by Adam the Monk, who then passed the church and its lands to the Abbey of St Albans. St Bartholemew's Benedictine Priory and the Chapel of Holy Sepulchre were also established in the 12th century.

A community of Dominicans established Sudbury Priory in the mid-13th century and gradually extended the size of their priory, which was one of three Dominican priories in the county of Suffolk. A leper hospital was founded on the outskirts of the town in 1272.

Sudbury was one of the first towns in which Edward III settled the Flemings, allowing the weaving and silk industries to prosper for centuries during the Late Middle Ages. As the main town in the area, Sudbury prospered too, and many great houses and churches were built, giving the town a major historical legacy. The Woolsack in the House of Lords was originally stuffed with wool from the Sudbury area, a sign of both the importance of the wool industry and of the wealth of the donors.

One citizen of Sudbury, Archbishop Simon Sudbury showed that not even the Tower of London guarantees safety. On 14 June 1381, guards opened the Tower's doors and allowed a party of rebellious peasants to enter. Sudbury, who had introduced an unpopular poll tax, was dragged to Tower Hill and beheaded. His body was afterwards buried in Canterbury Cathedral, but his skull is kept in St Gregory's Church, one of the three medieval churches in Sudbury. Simon's concerns for his native town are reflected in the founding of St Leonard's Hospital in 1372, a place of respite, towards Long Melford, for lepers. For the College of St Gregory, which he founded in 1375 to support eight priests, he used his father's former house and an adjoining plot.

From the 16th to 18th century. the weaving industry was less consistently profitable and Sudbury experienced periods of varying prosperity. By means of the borough court, the mayor and corporation directed the affairs of the town. They built a house of correction (1624) for 'rogues, vagabonds and sturdy beggars' and tried to finance the reconstruction of Ballingdon Bridge, which disappeared during a storm on 4 September 1594. Among theatrical companies that they paid to visit Sudbury were Lord Strange's Men (1592) and the King's Men (1610). Minor infringements, such as not attending church, were punished by fines; for worse offenders there was a stocks or a whipping. During the Civil War, a 12-strong band of watchmen was created to prevent the town's enemies, presumed to be Royalists, burning it down.

Sudbury and the surrounding area, like much of East Anglia, was a hotbed of Puritan sentiment during much of the 17th century. Sudbury was among the towns called "notorious wasps' nests of dissent." During the 1630s, many families departed for the Massachusetts Bay Colony as part of the wave of emigration that occurred during the Great Migration.

In 1706, the River Stour Navigation Act 1705 (4 & 5 Ann. c. 2) was passed in Parliament, and work was undertaken to make the river navigable all the way from Manningtree.

By the 18th century, the fees charged to become a freeman, with voting rights, were exorbitant and the borough of Sudbury, along with 177 other English towns, was reformed by the Municipal Corporations Act 1835.

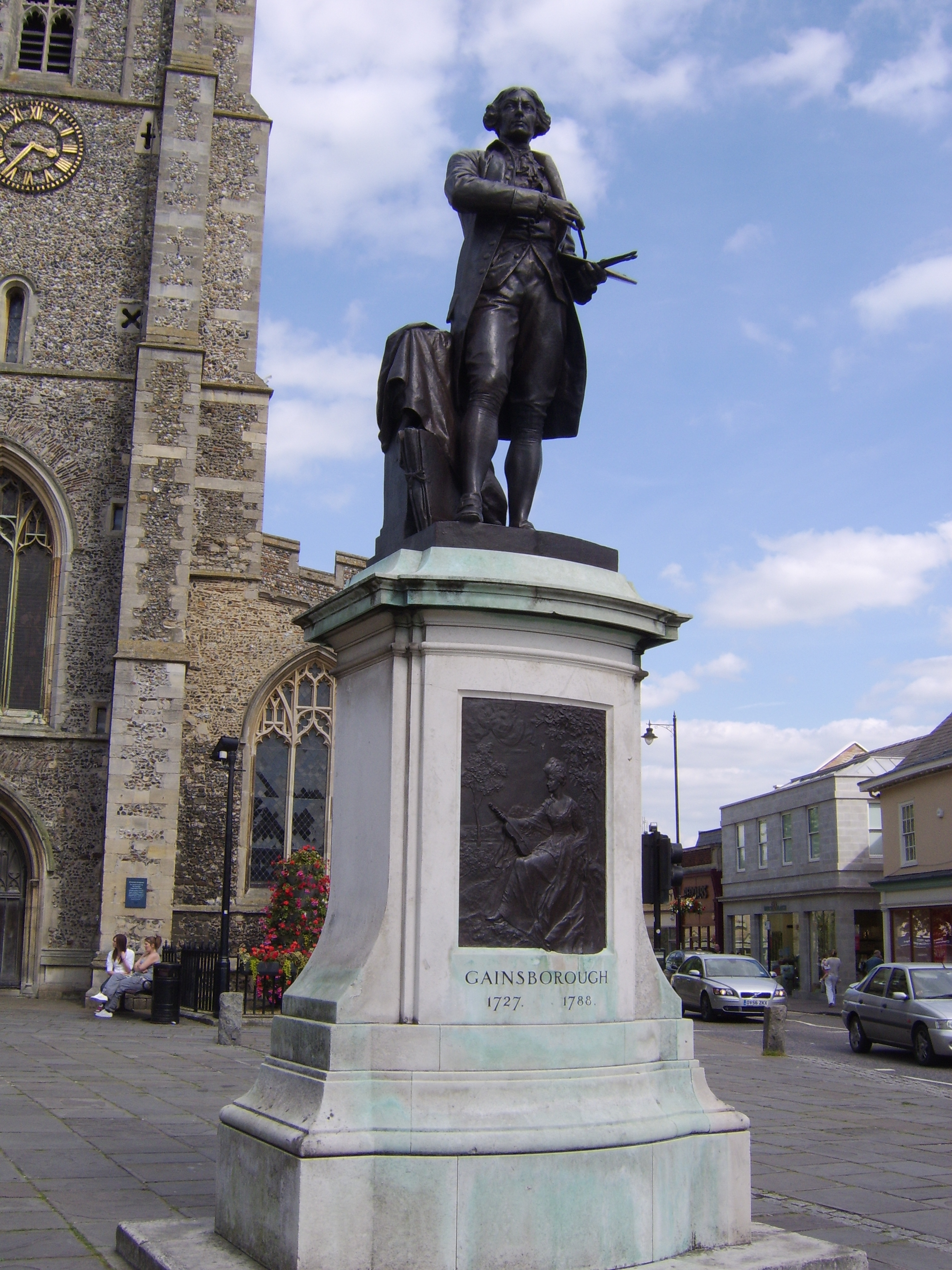
Statue of the painter Thomas Gainsborough on Market Hill

During the 18th century, Sudbury became famous for its local artists. John Constable painted in the area, especially the River Stour. Painter Thomas Gainsborough was born in Sudbury in 1727, and was educated at Sudbury Grammar School. His birthplace, now named Gainsborough's House, is a museum to his work and is open to the public. It houses many valuable pictures and some of his family possessions. A statue of Gainsborough was unveiled in the town centre outside St Peter's Church on Market Hill in 1913.

=== Victorian times to 1960s ===
The Reform Act 1832 (2 & 3 Will. 4. c. 45) saw the villages of Ballingdon and Brundon appended to the town. In the 1841 general election Sudbury became the first place in the UK to elect a member of an ethnic minority to parliament, with David Ochterlony Dyce Sombre, the son of an Indian queen, winning the seat. However, he was not allowed to take his place in parliament as he was subsequently declared insane.

From 1836-1889 Sudbury had its own police force. Sudbury was one of the six Suffolk boroughs required by the Municipal Corporations Act 1835 to form a police force, as the old parish constable system was considered ineffective to deal with rising crime and growing public disorder. The Council’s new Watch Committee was put in charge of the force.

A new workhouse was built in 1836 off Walnut Tree Lane, close to St Gregory's church. From 1946, with the foundation of the National Health Service, it became the local cottage hospital.

Sudbury's Catholic Church, Our Lady Immaculate and St. John the Evangelist, was designed by Leonard Stokes and erected in 1893. The shrine of Our Lady of Sudbury sits within its nave.

During the Second World War an American squadron of B-24 Liberator bombers of the 834th Squadron (H), 486th Bomb Group (H), 8th Air Force was based at RAF Sudbury. This squadron performed many important bombing and photographic missions during the war, but is perhaps best known as the "Zodiac Squadron", as its bombers were decorated with colourful images of the twelve signs of the zodiac painted by a professional artist named Phil Brinkman, who was taken into the squadron by its commander, Capt. Howell, specifically for the purpose of painting the bombers. Now most of the airfield buildings have been demolished, including the control tower. Sections of perimeter track, aircraft hard stand areas, and two narrow crossing lengths of former runways provide footpaths between Chilton, Newmans Green and Great Waldingfield. A number of pillboxes were constructed along the river and by Ballingdon Bridge, many of which are extant.

The Corn Exchange became the local public library after a successful campaign in the mid-1960s by the Corn Exchange Preservation Association to save it.

== Governance ==
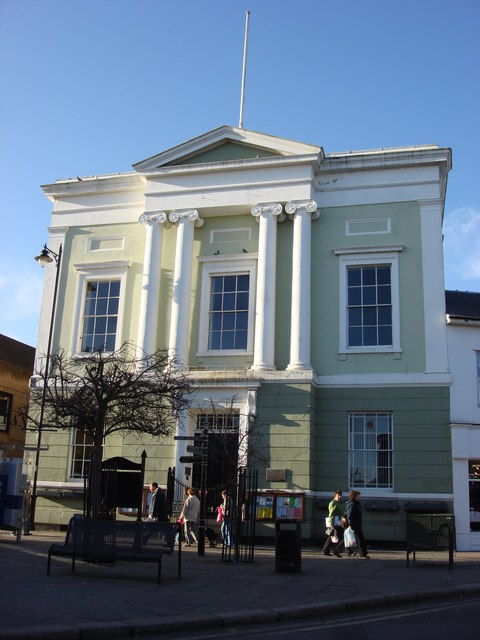
Sudbury Town Hall

In 1892 Sudbury became a municipal borough which became part of the administrative county of West Suffolk in 1889, with its headquarters at Sudbury Town Hall, the district contained the parishes of Sudbury and Ballingdon and until 1935 Sudbury St Bartholomew. In the local government reorganisation of 1974 the district was abolished to form Babergh, in the non-metropolitan county of Suffolk. A successor parish was formed covering the same area as the former district. Being an urban area the parish council and its chair are known as the 'Town Council' and 'Town Mayor' respectively.

Coat of arms of Arms of Sudbury Town Council
Notes Granted 20 September 1576 Crest On a Wreath of the Colours a Talbot's; Head erased Or between two Ostrich Feathers erect Argent. Escutcheon Sable a Talbot sejant Argent on a Chief Gules a Lion passant guardant between two Fleurs-de-Lis Or.

From 1559 until 1844 the parliamentary constituency of Sudbury returned two Members of Parliament, before it was disenfranchised for corruption. The Sudbury election of 1835, which Charles Dickens reported for the Morning Chronicle, is thought by many experts to be the inspiration for the famous Eatanswill election in his novel Pickwick Papers. In the previous year's by-election a dead heat of 263 votes each was recorded for the two candidates, Edward Barnes and J. Bagshaw. The mayor of Sudbury gave a casting vote to Barnes despite having already voted, and the decision led to serious riots in the town. A county constituency of the same name was established by the Redistribution of Seats Act 1885 for the 1885 general election, electing one MP by the first past the post voting system. It was abolished for the 1950 general election when it was merged with the Woodbridge constituency to form Sudbury and Woodbridge. In 1983 this constituency was abolished, and Sudbury formed part of the new South Suffolk constituency. The current MP is James Cartlidge (Conservative Party).

== Schools ==
The town's only secondary school is Ormiston Sudbury Academy. The school was formed, as Sudbury Upper School, in 1972 from an amalgamation of Sudbury Grammar School, the High School for Girls and the Secondary Modern School, following the introduction of comprehensive education. There are several primary schools, including Tudor CEVC Primary School, St. Gregory CEVCP, St Joseph's Roman Catholic Primary School and Woodhall Primary School. Salters Hall School which was partly housed in the town's fifteenth century building of the same name, was closed in 1995.

== Media ==
Television signals are received from the nearby Sudbury TV transmitter situated south east of the town.

The town is served by both BBC Radio Suffolk and BBC Essex. Other radio stations are Heart East, Greatest Hits Radio East, Nation Radio Suffolk, and Karisco Radio, a community based station.

Sudbury is served by a daily newspaper, the East Anglian Daily Times, owned by the Archant group. There are also two weekly newspapers, both published on a Thursday. The Sudbury Mercury, again owned by Archant, is delivered free to households, and the Suffolk Free Press, owned by Iliffe Media, is sold in shops around south Suffolk and north Essex.

== Sport ==
The town's main football club, A.F.C. Sudbury, was formed on 1 June 1999 by the amalgamation of two existing clubs, Sudbury Town (founded 1885) and Sudbury Wanderers (founded 1958). Three times FA Vase finalists, they are currently members of the Isthmian League Premier Division. The local rugby club, Sudbury R.F.C. have previously played as high as National 3 in English rugby, but are currently in the London 2 North East. The club's ground is in neighbouring village, Great Cornard. The town's oldest sports club is Sudbury Cricket Club, founded in 1787, who currently play in the East Anglian Premier League.

The Kingfisher Leisure Centre, next to the railway station, has a 25 m swimming pool, sauna, fitness centre and a soft play area for children. It is home to Sudbury Storms Swimming Club.

Rowing in the town is held at the Sudbury Rowing Club (formerly the Stour Boat Club) and was founded in 1869 and has held a regatta in the town every year since, except during the world wars. It has a boathouse and clubhouse in Quay Lane and rows on a 1500 m stretch of the Stour by Friars Meadow.

Other sporting groups include a canoeing club, a hapkido club, a running club and a boxing club.

== Culture ==
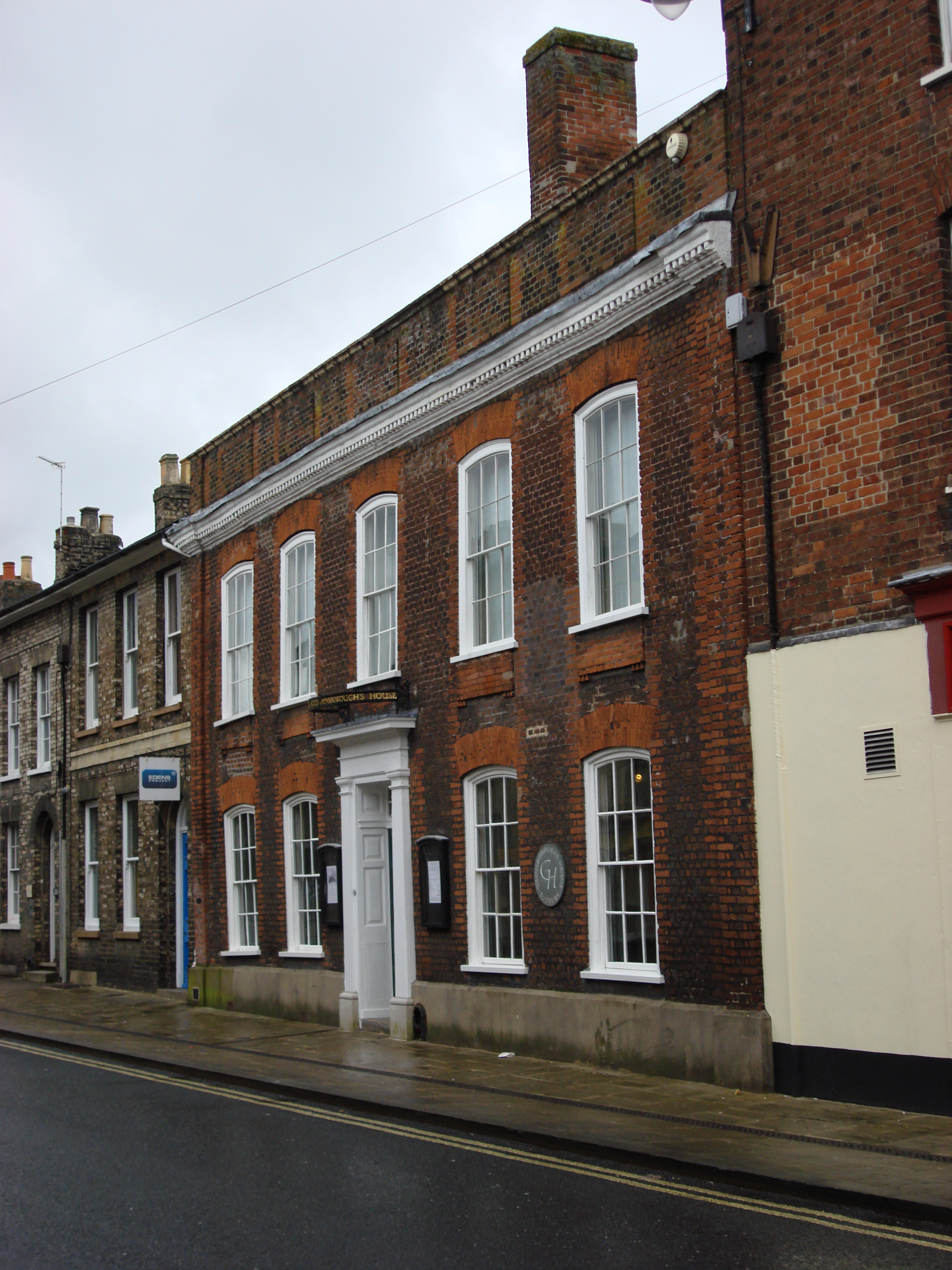
Thomas Gainsborough's house, now a public museum and gallery of his work.

Once a busy and important river port the last industrial building on the riverside in Sudbury has been converted into the town's Quay Theatre. The River Stour Trust, formed in 1968, has its headquarters in Sudbury, and a purpose built visitor centre located at Cornard Lock. The trust operates electric-powered boats from the Granary in Quay Lane, to Great Henny, a few miles downstream. Each September, the 24 mi (39 km) stretch of the River Stour hosts hundreds of canoe and small boat enthusiasts in a weekend event called Sudbury to the Sea, which finishes at Cattawade.

St Peter's Church, Sudbury a former church crowning the top of the Market Hill in the centre of Sudbury is now used as a cultural venue for live music and other performances, art exhibitions, and markets. St Peter's is currently in the delivery phase of a major regeneration project to conserve and refurbish the building, led by The Churches Conservation Trust.

Valley Walk cycle route and footpath, starts at the Sudbury water meadows and continues along the disused railway track, finishing close to Long Melford Country Park, and then connects to Melford Walk.

Commencing in 2006 the town has hosted the charity fundraising pop music festival, Leestock.

Children's author Dodie Smith lived near to Sudbury, and part of her famous novel The Hundred and One Dalmatians, which inspired the Disney film One Hundred and One Dalmatians, takes place in the town including St Peter's Church.

Just before midnight they came to the market town of Sudbury. Pongo paused as they crossed the bridge over the River Stour. "Here we enter Suffolk" he said, triumphantly. They ran on through the quiet streets of old houses and into the market square. They had hoped they might meet some dog and hear if any news of the puppies had come at the Twilight Barking, but not so much as a cat was stirring. While they were drinking at the fountain, church clocks began to strike midnight.

== Transport ==
By road, Sudbury is served by the A131 which runs from near Little Waltham, north of Chelmsford in Essex, and the A134 which runs from Colchester in Essex, through Bury St Edmunds, past Thetford in Norfolk to its west, before merging with the A10 south of King's Lynn. There is a taxi rank for Hackney carriages at Old Market Place. The bus station on Hamilton Road in the town centre provides services to neighbouring places, operated by Hedingham & Chambers and other operators.

The railway arrived in Sudbury in 1847 when Sudbury railway station was built on the Stour Valley Railway. The town escaped the Beeching Axe of the 1960s and maintained its rail link with London, although many villages further up the river lost their railway stations. Sudbury railway station now forms the terminus of the branch line which is marketed as the Gainsborough Line, with stops at Bures and Chappel and Wakes Colne railway stations, terminating at Marks Tey railway station. This junction on the Great Eastern Main Line provides connections to London, where trains terminate at Liverpool Street station.

The town was formerly a port; from 1705, horse-drawn lighters transported grain to the numerous water-mills, locally made bricks, coal and even coconuts used for mat-making in Sudbury and Long Melford. Cargos, such as hay and straw, were transhipped in the River Stour estuary at Mistley into Thames barges for transport to London for the horses; they brought back horse-manure for the wheat and barley fields that lie on both sides of the river. During the Great War of 1914–18, and fearing German invasion, the remaining fourteen Stour Lighters were scuttled in Ballingdon Cut. One of these was raised and completely rebuilt by the Pioneer Trust in Brightlingsea. It was delivered, fitted with electric propulsion, to the River Stour Trust in 2012.

== International links ==
The Canadian city of Greater Sudbury, Ontario (formerly known as Sudbury and still referred to as Sudbury in everyday usage) was named after Sudbury, becoming a settlement in 1883 following the discovery of rich nickel and copper ores there during the construction of the Canadian Pacific Railway. The superintendent of the railway construction project James Worthington was married to Caroline Hitchcock, a woman who had been born in Sudbury, Suffolk, and the name was chosen to honour her.

Sudbury has two namesakes in the New England region of the United States: Sudbury, Massachusetts, and Sudbury, Vermont.

=== Twin towns ===
Sudbury is twinned with Höxter in Germany, Clermont in France and Fredensborg in Denmark.

== Notable people ==
- Simon Sudbury (c. 1316–1381), Bishop of London, then Archbishop of Canterbury and later Lord Chancellor of England
- Paul Bayning, 1st Viscount Bayning of Sudbury (1588 – 1629), landed gentleman and Sheriff of Essex
- Thomas Gainsborough (1727–1788), portrait and landscape painter, draughtsman, and printmaker
- Andrew Phillips, Baron Phillips of Sudbury (1939–2023), solicitor, broadcaster, writer, Liberal Democrat politician, Chancellor of the University of Essex, co-founder of the Legal Action Group charity
- Maggi Hambling (born 1945), artist
- Stuart Slater (born 1969), professional footballer
- Joel Willans (born 1972), author, copywriter and advertising agency proprietor
- Amanda Ansell (born 1976), artist

The landscape painter John Constable (1776–1837) worked in and near the town. Ruralist journalist and farmer Adrian Bell (1901–1980) wrote the agricultural memoir Corduroy at his parents' rented house in the town. Musician Jack Bruce (1943–2014), lead singer and bassist of the rock band Cream, died in Sudbury.
