= Alnesbourne Priory =

Monastery in Suffolk, England

Coordinates: 52.023°N 1.196°E

Alnesbourne Priory, also known as Alnesbourn Priory, was a small Augustinian monastic house in the English county of Suffolk. It was located near Nacton to the south-east of Ipswich near the River Orwell and the current route of the A14.

The priory was probably founded in the 13th century by Albert de Neville, possibly as a satellite of Woodbridge Priory. It was annexed by the monks of Woodbridge at some point in the 15th century, possibly 1466. The priory was "ruinous" by 1514, although remains of the priory church can be found in the walls of Alnesbourne Priory Country Club and form the basis for the listing of the building as a Grade II listed building.

The priory was in the old parish of Hallowtree or Halghetree, the church of which formed part of its holding. The village is mentioned in the Domesday Book of 1086 as a very small village with about four households (which was held by the church of Alnesbourn St Andrew before the Norman Conquest). One of these houses is likely to have been Pond Hall Farm. At the time of the survey the village was held by Roger of Poitou.

Alnesbourn Priory was an extra-parochial area, it became a separate civil parish in 1858, on 1 April 1934 the parish was abolished and merged with Nacton, part also went to Ipswich. In 1931 the parish had a population of 36.

== See also ==
- List of monastic houses in Suffolk
- Abandoned village
