= St Peter's Church, Sudbury =

Coordinates: 52.0387°N 0.7314°E

St Peter's, Sudbury
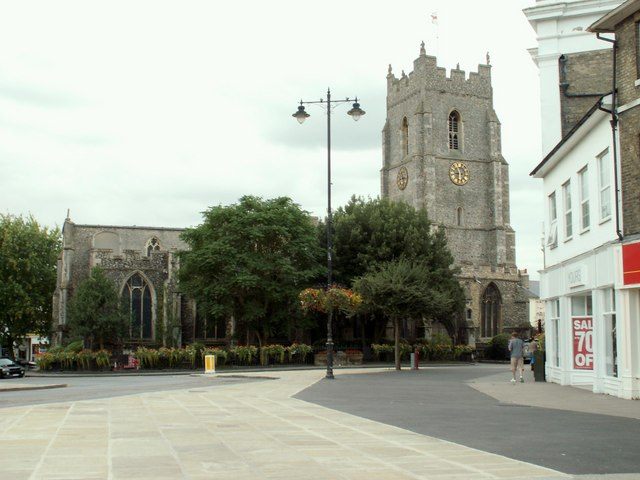
- St Peter's, Sudbury, from the north

- Location in Suffolk
- OS grid reference: TL 875 414
- Location: Sudbury, Suffolk
- Country: England
- Website: St Peters Sudbury

History
- Dedication: Saint Peter

Architecture
- Functional status: Redundant
- Heritage designation: Grade I
- Designated: 3 March 1952
- Architect(s): William Butterfield; George Frederick Bodley (restorations)
- Architectural type: Church
- Style: Gothic

Specifications
- Materials: Flint with some stone, tile and brick

St Peter's Church, Sudbury is a former Anglican church in the town of Sudbury, Suffolk, England, which now serves as an Arts Centre. The building is recorded in the National Heritage List for England as a designated Grade I listed building, and is under the care of the Churches Conservation Trust. The building stands in the heart of the town in a dominating position on Market Hill.

A church has been on the site since at least 1180, but the current structure dates from the 15th century, though there have been several restorations in the intervening period.

== History ==
The earliest documentary record of the church is in 1180, when it was a chapel of ease to St Gregory's Church. The church was built in three stages, beginning with the first two bays of the chancel and the base of the tower in about 1330–48. The later stages of building were in about 1360, and in about 1425–50. In 1643, during the Civil War, the iconoclast William Dowsing damaged many of the items in the church. A restoration took place in 1685, which included some alterations to the nave roof. A clock was installed in 1701, and during the first half of the 18th century a spire of metal and wood was added; this was replaced by another spire in 1810. The church was restored again in 1858–59 by William Butterfield; this included removal of the three galleries and the box pews, re-laying the chancel floor, and replacement of the pulpit. Stained glass made by Hardman & Co. was installed in some of the windows, and more stained glass by Hardman was installed later in the century.

In 1898 the chancel was restored and redecorated by George Frederick Bodley. A wooden reredos was installed in the Lady Chapel. The stonework of the exterior was restored in 1911, when statues were inserted into three niches in the south porch. A further restoration took place in 1968 when the upper part of the tower was replaced, the spire was taken down, and most of Bodley's paintings were removed from the chancel. The church was declared redundant in 1972, and in 1976 was vested in the Redundant Churches Fund, the forerunner of the Churches Conservation Trust. A charitable trust, The Friends of St. Peter's was established to support the Churches Conservation Trust in maintaining the church. St Peter's now houses Sudbury Arts Centre and is used as an arts, heritage and community venue, operated as a social enterprise.

== Architecture ==
=== Exterior ===
The church is constructed mainly in flint, with some stone, brick and tiles. Its plan is not quite rectangular, as it had to be confined into a limited space. The northwest corner is cut across, and the chancel is not fully in alignment with the nave. The plan consists of a six-bay nave with a clerestory, north and south aisles, a two-bay chancel with the organ chamber and vestry to the north and the Lady Chapel to the south, and an extended sanctuary to the east, and a west tower incorporated in the body of the church. Its architectural styles are Decorated and Perpendicular. The tower is in three stages with angle buttresses. Its parapet consists of stepped battlements, and at the corners are statues rather than pinnacles. The aisles also have battlemented parapets, and there are more buttresses around the church. The main entrance to the church is through the west door at the base of the tower. Formerly the main entrance was through the south porch. The three statues on the exterior of the porch represent Christ, with Saint Peter on one side and Saint Gregory on the other.

=== Interior ===
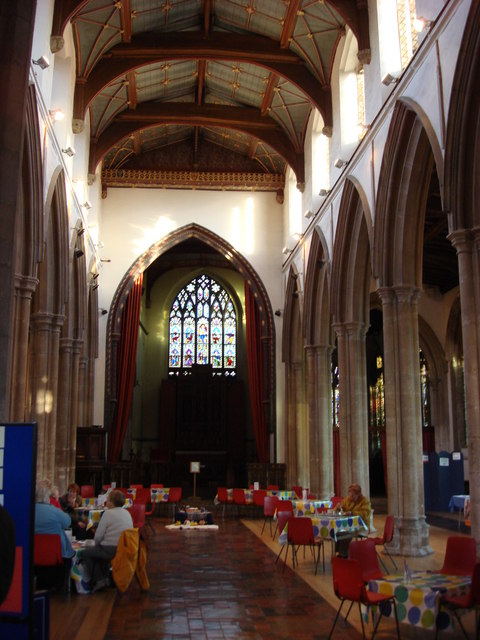
Church interior, 2007

The arcades are in six bays, the piers on the north arcade differing from those on the south. The roof is ceiled and divided into panels, with gilt bosses at the intersections. It is the only medieval nave roof in Suffolk to be ceiled and panelled in its original form. Some of Bodley's painting remains on the chancel arch. In the south aisle is the octagonal 15th-century font. This was removed from the church in the 17th century to be used as a horse trough, but was returned to the church when the horses refused to drink from it.

In the chancel the reredos designed by Bodley measures 20 feet (6.1 m) high by 7 feet (2.1 m) wide, and depicts the Crucifixion. On the sides of the chancel are 15th-century screens. In the Lady Chapel the font is carved with a depiction of the Nativity, and the reredos is a copy of Leonardo da Vinci's Last Supper. Over the north and south doors are paintings of Moses and Aaron. These were painted by Robert Cardinall, and formerly hung in a position flanking the reredos at the east end of the church.

The lectern, pulpit and altar are Victorian, as is the stained glass. The three-manual organ was built in 1911 by T. C. Lewis. It was renovated in 1942 by Henry Willis & Sons, and rebuilt in 1987 by Bishop. A major rebuild was carried out by J. W. Walker & Sons Ltd in 1999. There is a ring of ten bells, the oldest three being cast in about 1470, and the most recent two in 1978.

== See also ==
- List of churches preserved by the Churches Conservation Trust in the East of England
