= Ixworth Priory =

Grade I listed building in Ixworth, Suffolk, England

Ixworth Abbey
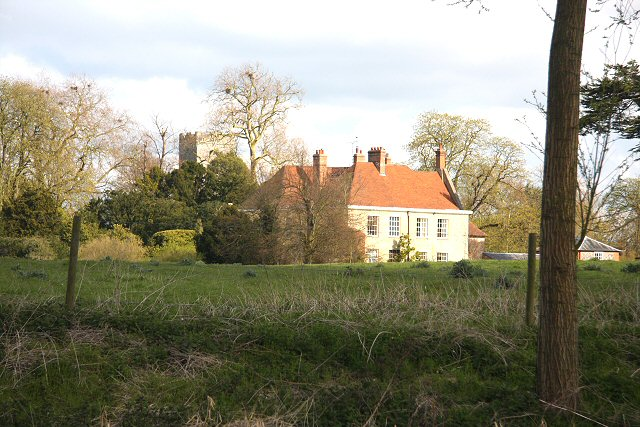
- Ixworth Abbey, incorporating the remains of Ixworth Priory

- Location within Suffolk
- 52.298°N 0.829°E
- Location: Ixworth, Suffolk, England

Listed Building – Grade I
- Official name: Ixworth Abbey
- Designated: 14 July 1955
- Reference no.: 1031475

Ixworth Priory was an Augustine priory at Ixworth in the English county of Suffolk. It was founded in the 12th century and dissolved in 1537. The priory was dedicated to St Mary and founded by Gilbert Blundus.

The original building, possibly from around 1100, may have been destroyed by a period of civil war and rebuilt on the present site on the west edge of Ixworth. Remains of the priory include the almost complete east range whilst some of the west range can be found incorporated into a house, known as Ixworth Abbey. Stone from the ruins of the priory was used to build Hengrave Hall north of Bury St Edmunds in the early 16th century.

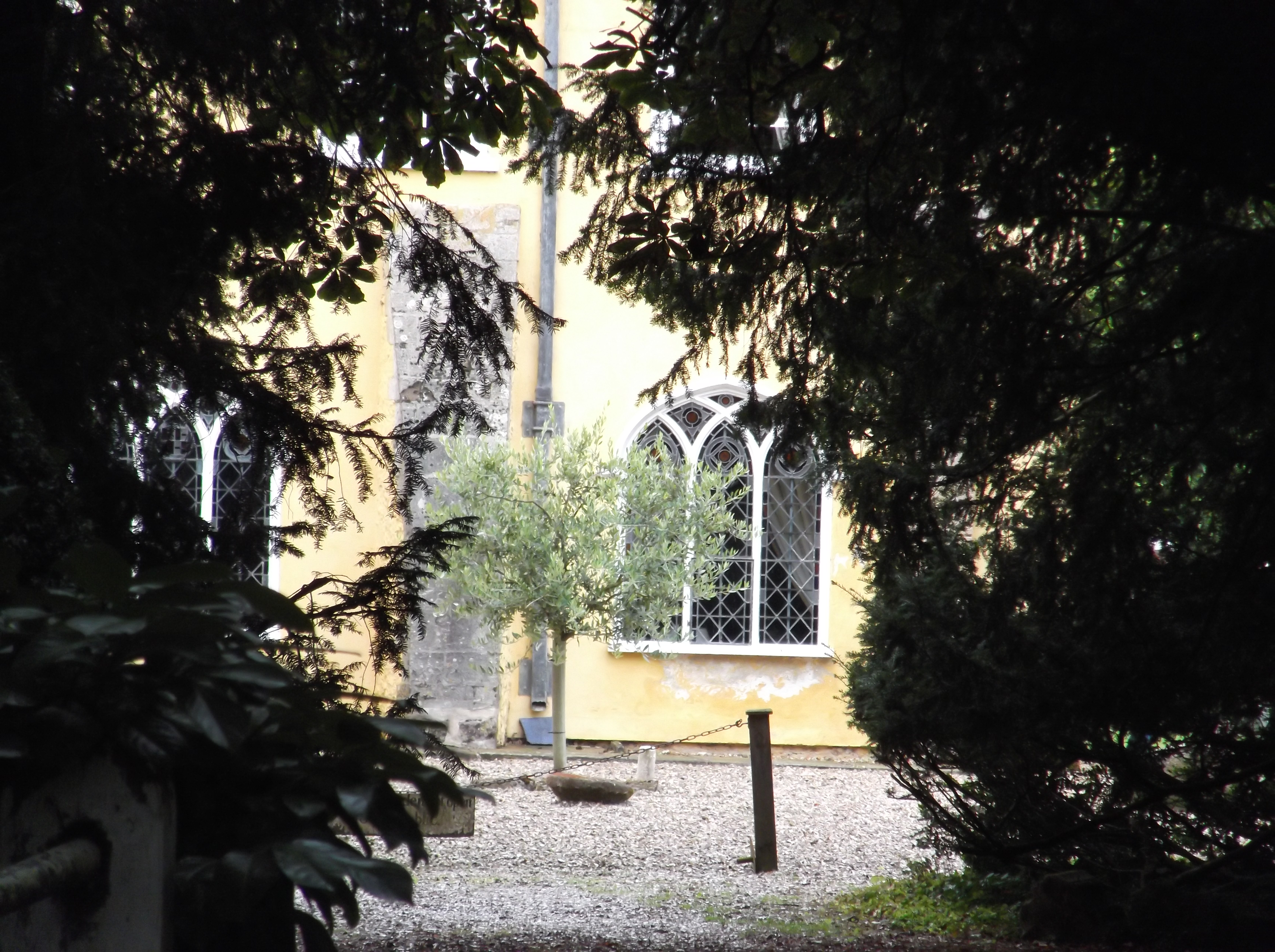
Ixworth Abbey

== See also ==
- List of monastic houses in Suffolk
