= Woodbridge Priory =

Former priory in Suffolk

Coordinates: 52.0931°N 1.3138°E

Woodbridge Priory was a small Augustinian priory of canons regular in Woodbridge in the English county of Suffolk. The priory was founded in around 1193 by Ernald Rufus and was dissolved about 1537 during the dissolution of the monasteries. The site was acquired by the Wingfield family before passing to Thomas Seckford in 1564. The priory operated a satellite house at Alnesbourne on the River Orwell until about 1466.

Today the site is used by Woodbridge School for its prep school, as part of the Seckford Trust.
