= Simon Sudbury =

Archbishop of Canterbury from 1375 to 1381

- Archbishop of Canterbury; Primate of All England
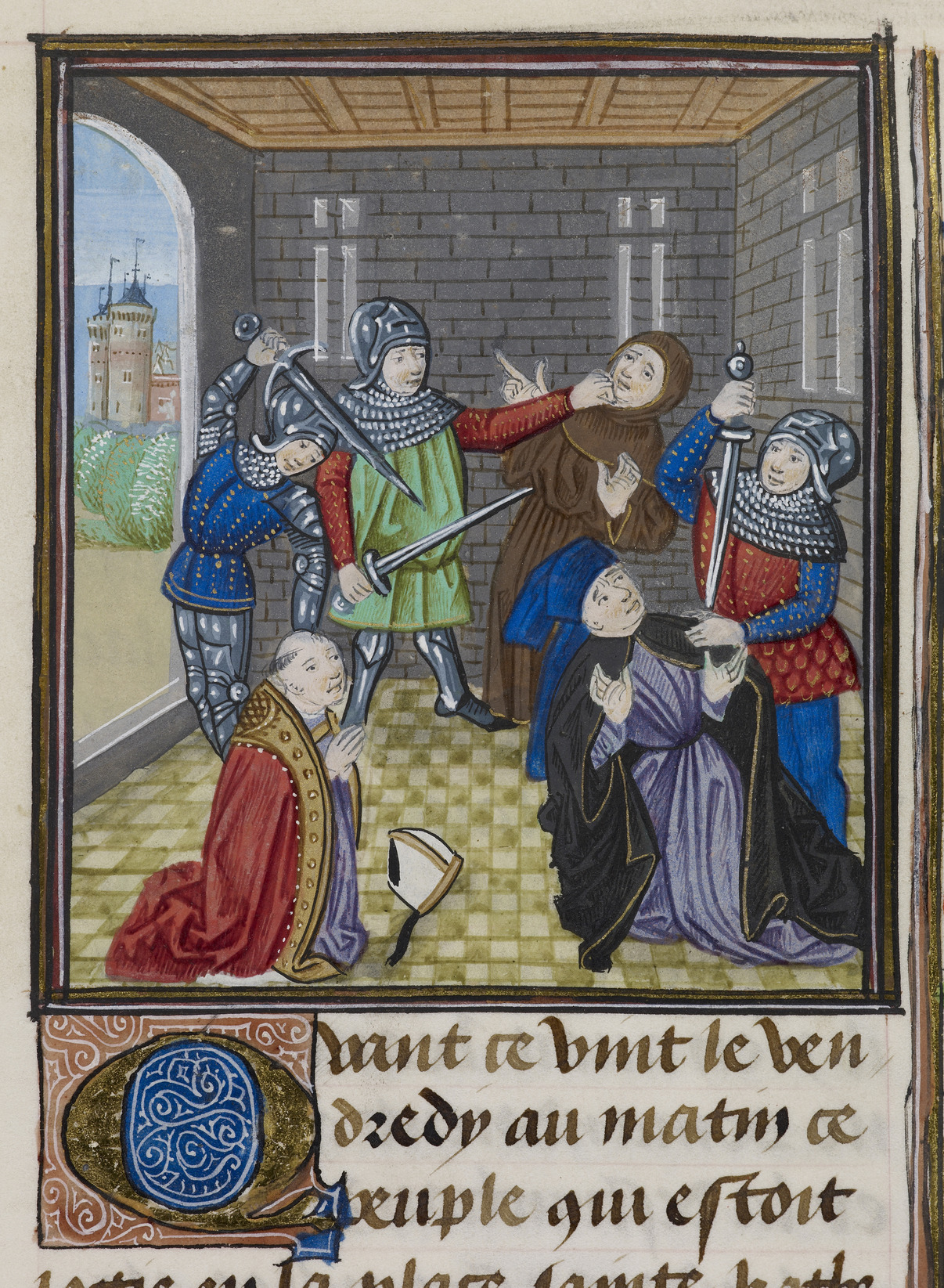
- A 15th-century depiction of the murder of Archbishop Simon of Sudbury and Sir Robert Hales at the Tower of London.
- Church: Catholic Church
- Appointed: 4 May 1375
- Installed: Unknown
- Term ended: 14 June 1381
- Predecessor: William Whittlesey
- Successor: William Courtenay
- Other post: Bishop of London

Orders
- Consecration: 20 March 1362

Personal details
- Born: c. 1316
- Died: 14 June 1381 (aged 64–65)

Simon Sudbury (Note: Also known as Simon Theobald of Sudbury, and Simon of/de Sudbury.) (c. 1316 – 14 June 1381) was Bishop of London from 1361 to 1375, Archbishop of Canterbury from 1375 until his death, and in the last year of his life Lord Chancellor of England. He met a violent death during the Peasants' Revolt in 1381.

== Life ==
The son of Nigel Theobald, Simon of Sudbury (as he later became known) was born at Sudbury in Suffolk, studied at the University of Paris, and became one of the chaplains of Pope Innocent VI, one of the Avignon popes, who in 1356 sent him on a mission to Edward III of England.

In 1361 Sudbury was made Chancellor of Salisbury and in October that year the pope provided him to be Bishop of London, Sudbury's consecration occurring on 20 March 1362. He was soon serving Edward III as an ambassador and in other ways. On 4 May 1375 he succeeded William Whittlesey as archbishop of Canterbury, and during the rest of his life was a partisan of John of Gaunt.

In July 1377, following the death of Edward III in June, Simon of Sudbury crowned the new king, Richard II, at Westminster Abbey, and in 1378 John Wycliffe appeared before him at Lambeth, but Sudbury only undertook proceedings against him under great pressure.

In January 1380, Sudbury became Lord Chancellor of England, and the insurgent peasants regarded him as one of the principal authors of their woes. Having released John Ball from his prison at Maidstone, the Kentish insurgents attacked and damaged the archbishop's property at Canterbury and Lambeth; then, rushing into the Tower of London, they seized the archbishop himself. So unpopular was Sudbury with the rebellious peasants that guards simply allowed the rebels through the gates, the reason being his role in introducing the third poll tax.

=== Death ===
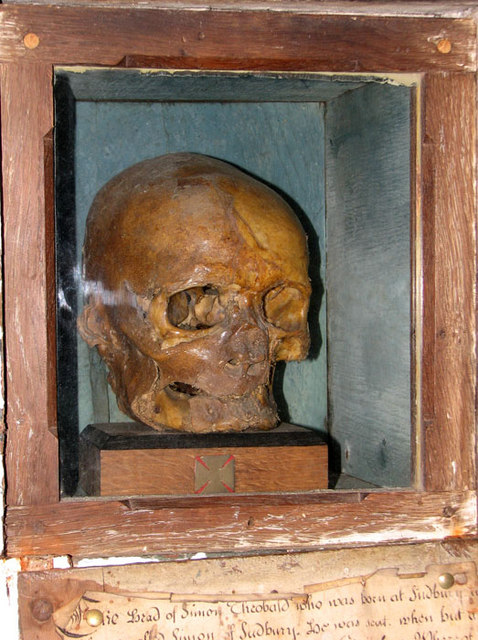
Simon Sudbury's preserved head at St Gregory's Church, Sudbury

Sudbury, who was saying Mass in St John's Chapel, was dragged to Tower Hill together with Sir Robert Hales, the Lord High Treasurer. According to an account written by John Stow two centuries later, Sudbury was beheaded by eight frenzied sword blows to his neck, one of which also took off the fingers from one hand. His body lay in the open all day, but his severed head had his clerical hood nailed onto it and was fixed to a pole, then placed on London Bridge. His body was afterwards taken to Canterbury Cathedral, though his head was taken down after six days by William Walworth, the Lord Mayor of London, and was taken to Sudbury, where it is still kept at St Gregory's Church, which Sudbury had partly rebuilt. With his brother, John of Chertsey, he also founded a college in Sudbury; he also did some building at Canterbury. His father was Nigel Theobald, sometimes called Simon Theobald or Tybald, who is also buried at St Gregory's, with his wife Sara.

In March 2011 a CT scan of Sudbury's mummified skull was performed at the West Suffolk Hospital to make a facial reconstruction, which was completed in September 2011 by forensics expert Adrienne Barker at the University of Dundee.

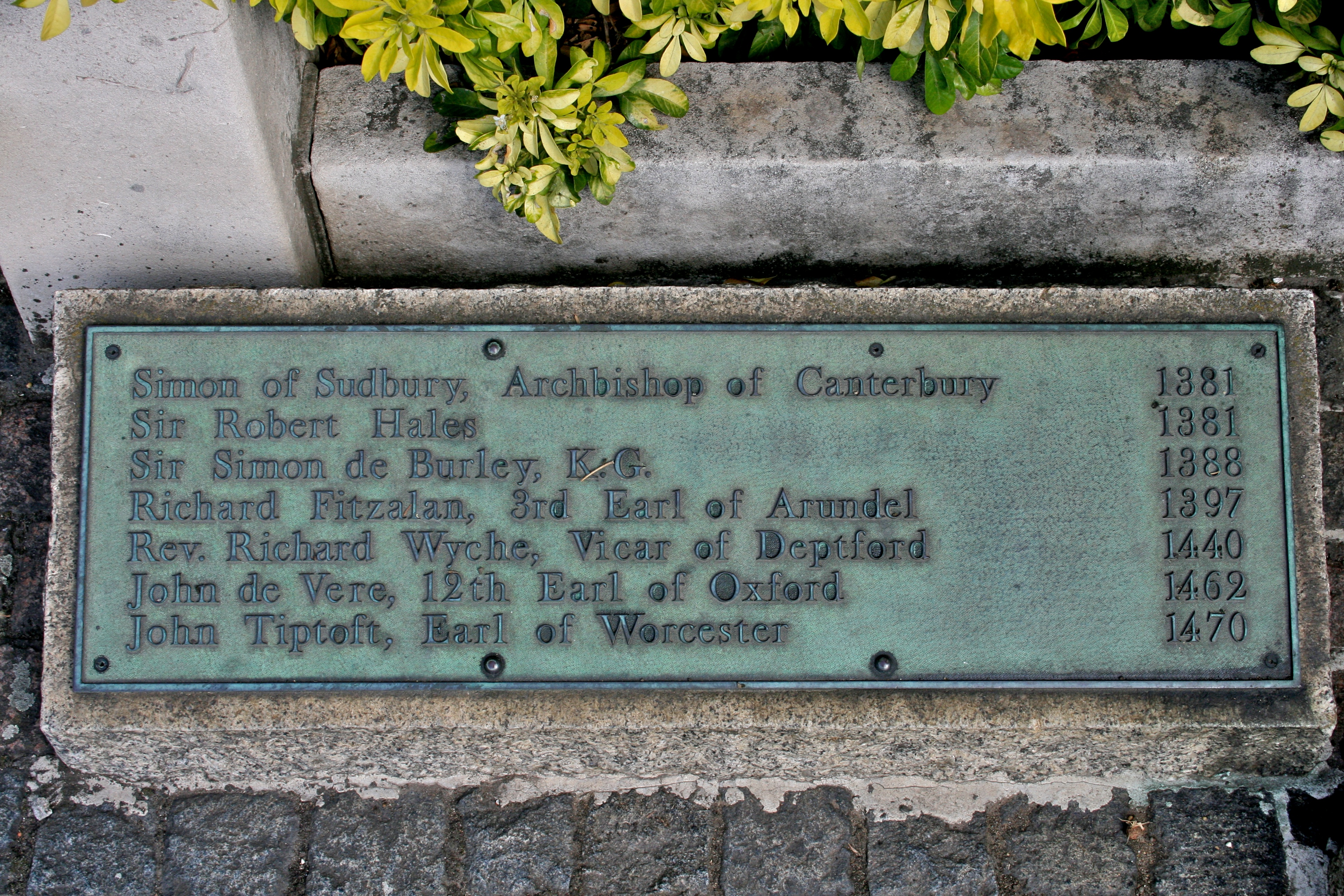
Plaque at Tower Hill, commemorating notable executions at that site

Sudbury's tomb in Canterbury Cathedral contains his corpse with a lead cannonball in place of the missing head. The stone sarcophagus lacks the original gilt copper effigy, which was destroyed during the English Reformation, but the elaborately carved stone canopy survives. By ancient tradition, the mayor of Canterbury places a wreath of red roses on the tomb at an annual civic service on Christmas Day, in recognition of Sudbury's good works for the city.

== Arms ==
Sudbury's coat of arms was a talbot hound sejeant within a bordure engrailed, as is visible sculpted in stone on a wall in the nave of Canterbury Cathedral. The town of Sudbury uses a talbot hound sejeant in its arms in allusion to him.

== Citations ==
Political offices
Preceded by Richard Scrope	Lord Chancellor; 1380–1381	Succeeded by Hugh Segrave
Catholic Church titles
Preceded by Michael Northburgh	Bishop of London; 1361–1375	Succeeded by William Courtenay
Preceded by William Whittlesey	Archbishop of Canterbury; 1375–1381	Succeeded by William Courtenay
