= Sudbury Priory =

- Dominican Priory of Sudbury
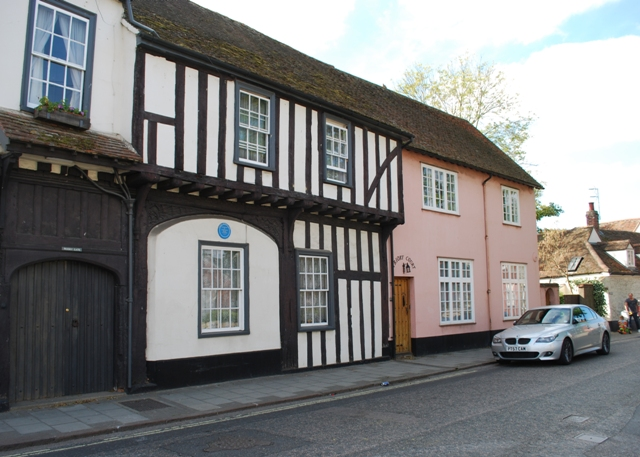
- The gatehouse of Sudbury Priory in Friar Street

- Location in Suffolk
- 52°02′09″N 0°43′33″E
- Location: Sudbury, Suffolk
- Country: England
- Denomination: Roman Catholic

History
- Status: Dominican Priory
- Founded: 1272
- Founder: Baldwin de Shimperling
- Dedication: Saint Saviour

Architecture
- Closed: 1538 or 1539

The Dominican Priory of Sudbury or Sudbury Priory, was a medieval priory of the Dominican Order, also known as the Order of Friar Preachers or "Black Friars", in the town of Sudbury, Suffolk, England. The community was dispersed and the buildings demolished during the English Reformation in the 16th century. The materials were used to construct a large house on the same site, which survived into the 19th century.

== History ==
The Dominican Friars had arrived in England in about 1224, and came to Sudbury in 1272 when Baldwin de Shimperling and his wife Mabilla had a house built for them, supported by an endowment. Originally sited on 5 acres (2.0 ha) of land, the priory site was added to a number of times in the following century, including a gift in 1352 of more than 8 acres (3.2 ha) by Nigel Theobald, the father of Simon Sudbury, later the Archbishop of Canterbury. In 1380, Simon himself donated a 20 feet (6.1 m) square plot of land at a nearby spring, so that an underground conduit could be constructed to the priory for a fresh water supply; however, local opposition to the scheme caused a five year delay, and was only completed after the friars had applied for and received royal protection. The site included a priory church dedicated to Saint Saviour. A number of prominent local families had tombs in the church, including the Giffords, Cressenons, Walgraves and St. Quentins. The heart of the exiled lawyer, Sir Thomas Weyland, is said to have been interred at the priory church after his death in 1298. A notable figure in the priory community was John Hodgkins or Hodgkin, who was appointed provincial superior of the Dominicans in England in 1527 and was granted a house and garden inside the priory grounds; he later became the Protestant Bishop of Bedford.

During the tenure of John Cotton, the last prior, the priory was suppressed as part of the Dissolution of the Monasteries. The value of the estate was estimated at £222 and 18 shillings. In October 1539, the priory estate and buildings were granted to Thomas Eden, the Clerk of the King's Council and his wife, Griselda. They had the church and friars' house demolished and a large house built in its place. This stood about 50 yards (46 m) back from Friar Street until about 1820, when it was demolished by its owner, James Marriott. He planned to reuse the materials in building a new church at his estate at Twinstead, which was never completed. During the demolition, a number of old tombs were uncovered; one stone sarcophagus was reused as a horse trough at the Maldon Grey pub in Sudbury, but had been broken up by the turn of the 20th century.

The only surviving elements of the original priory are the half timbered gatehouse in Friars Street, which dates from about 1500 and is a Grade II* listed building, and three 15th-century dwelling houses at 62a-64 Friars Street, which originally formed part of the priory complex and are Grade II listed.
