= Sudbury Benedictine Priory =

Monastery in Sudbury, Suffolk, England

Coordinates: 52.0519924°N 0.7273266°E

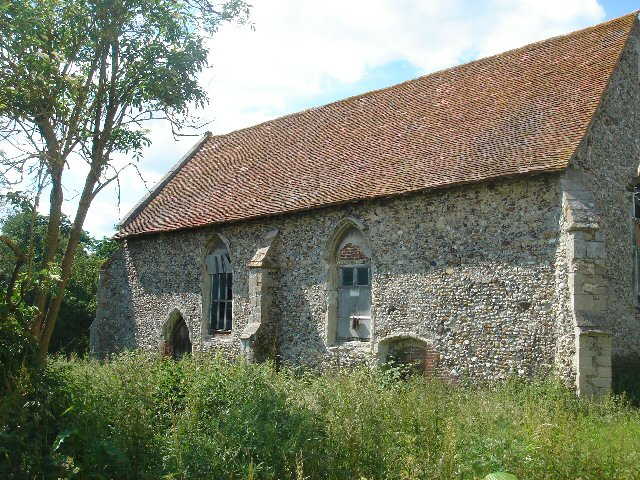
St Bartholemew's priory chapel, Sudbury

St Bartholemew's Benedictine Priory, Sudbury was a priory in Sudbury, Suffolk, England.

The priory was established as a monastic grange for the Benedictine monastery at Westminster Abbey in 1115, and was founded by Wulfric, the master or the royal mint at Sudbury. In 1540, the priory was dissolved and granted to the dean and chapter of Westminster, who continued to hold an annual service in the chapel until the mid-19th century. Any surviving buildings from the priory were demolished in 1779, except the chapel and a barn.

The chapel, dating from the early 15th century, is a single cell design and has some remnants of the original Perpendicular Gothic window tracery. It is a Grade II* listed building. The barn is built of weatherboard over a wooden frame and has a hipped roof of reed thatch. It is noted as one of the best examples of a medieval barn in Suffolk. The barn was demolished after a fire in 2011 and was delisted on 31 October 2023.
