= North Marston =

Village in Buckinghamshire, England

Coordinates: 51.897°N 0.873°W

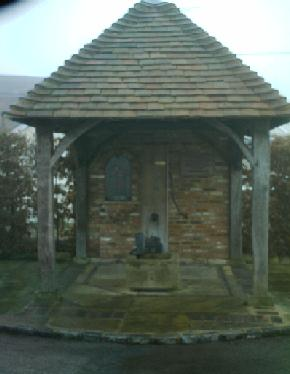
- The Holy Well of John Schorne, Schorne Lane, North Marston

- Location within Buckinghamshire
- Population: 781 (2011 Census including Hogshaw)
- OS grid reference: SP775227
- Civil parish: North Marston
- Unitary authority: Buckinghamshire
- Ceremonial county: Buckinghamshire
- Region: South East
- Country: England
- Sovereign state: United Kingdom
- Post town: BUCKINGHAM
- Postcode district: MK18
- Dialling code: 01296
- Police: Thames Valley
- Fire: Buckinghamshire
- Ambulance: South Central
- UK Parliament: Buckingham and Bletchley

North Marston is a village and civil parish in the Buckinghamshire district in the ceremonial county of Buckinghamshire, England. It is located about three miles south of Winslow, and four miles north of Waddesdon.

The village name 'Marston' is a common one in England, and is Anglo-Saxon for 'farm by a marsh'. This refers to the common state of the land in the Aylesbury Vale, where the water table is quite high. The prefix 'North' was added later to distinguish the village from nearby Fleet Marston. The population of the village is approximately 700 and there are about 280 houses.

The facilities in North Marston include:

- a village hall, which was built as a war memorial after the First World War
- a pub called The Pilgrim (formerly, The Bell) that reopened in May 2010
- a village shop. The Shop North Marston opened in June 2011
- a recreation ground and sports field (that is shared with Granborough)

A recent project within the village has re-created the sports field, which is now called the North Marston and Granborough Community Sports Field. In the field there is a pavilion, football pitch, running track, nature trail and cricket nets. There is a cricket team (North Marston & Granborough Cricket Club).

The village borders with Oving, Pitchcott, Quainton, Hogshaw, Granborough, Swanbourne and Hoggeston.

== St Mary's Church ==
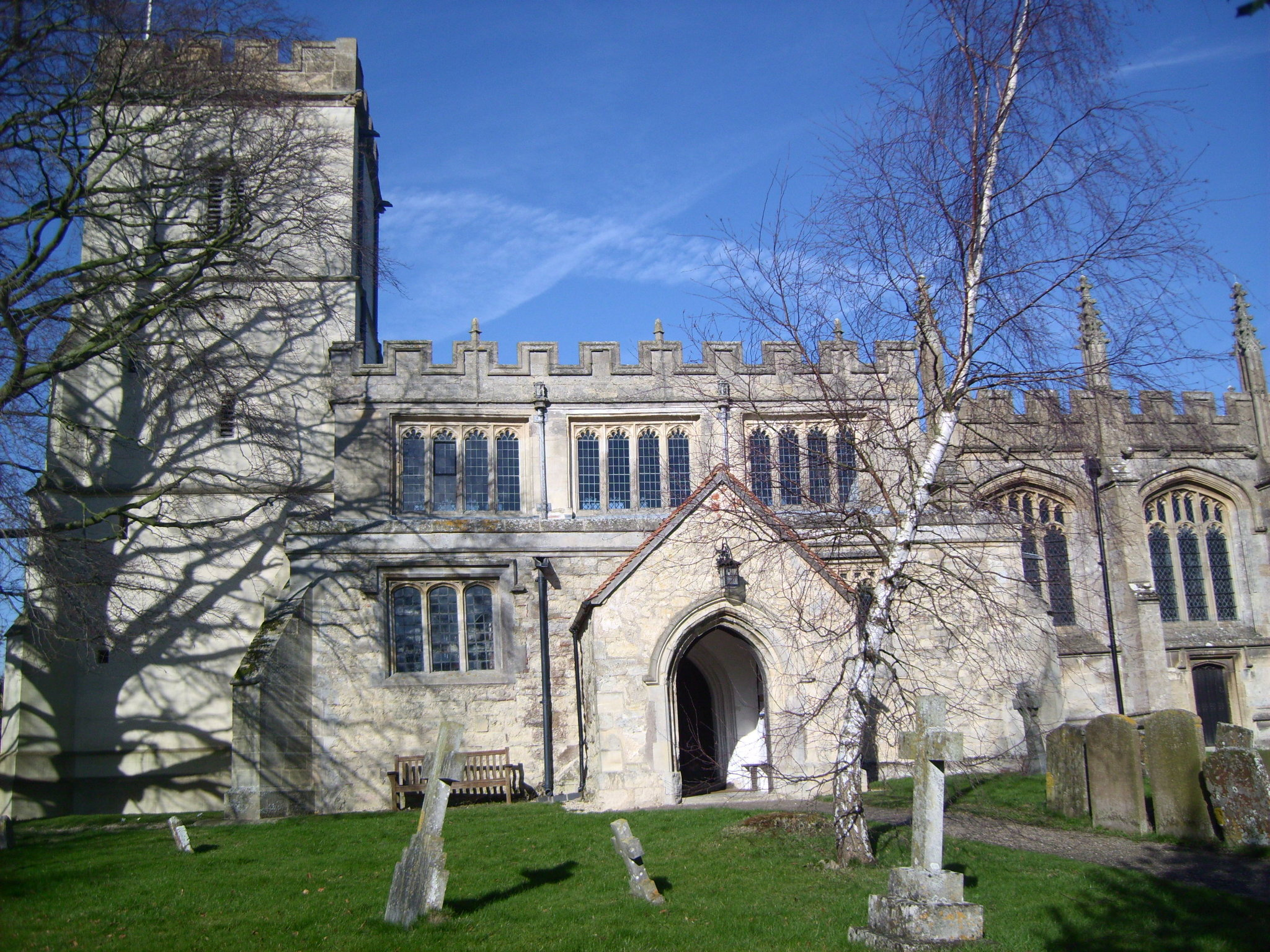
St Mary's Church, North Marston

The parish church is dedicated to the Assumption of the Blessed Virgin Mary; the foundation stones of the church on this site were laid around the 12th century. Pilgrim money enabled the nave roof to be raised and clerestory windows put in. The inner part of the tower dates back to the 15th century: from 2002 to 2004 all of the outer stones were replaced due to crumbling. There are six bells in the tower – tuned to the key of F – and a tenor weight of 13-2-27 from 1925 (with original inscriptions dating from as far back as the 16th century).

In 2004 the Methodist chapel closed for worship and the Parish Church has been in a Local Ecumenical Partnership with the Methodists. Now renovated, the chapel building is used by the church for coffee mornings and lunches, as well as being a venue for hire.

== Holy Well or Schorne Well ==
There is a holy well in the village, found by Sir John Schorne, who was rector of the parish of North Marston in about 1290. He was referred to as a saint who, it is claimed, performed many miracles. It was he that blessed the village well and after his death it became a resort of great pilgrimage. Pilgrims probably stayed at one or two of the houses in Church Street that still stand today, but most of the houses were destroyed in a later fire. The Holy Well was renovated in 2004/2005, after many other designs had been put in place. On the day of its official reopening a poem was read; this can be found here, with some 'before' and 'after' pictures.

== Education ==
The North Marston Church of England School is a mixed Church of England primary school. It is a voluntary controlled school, which takes children from the age of four through to the age of eleven. The school has approximately 100 pupils. It is situated across the road from the parish church. The school has 3 "houses" each named for local reasons: Camden Neild (Red) Verney (Green) Schorne (Blue)

There was also "The Schorne College" situated in the grounds of the church directly opposite the present site of the School

The Village has a pre-school called Schorne Pre-School which has been running for around twenty years now.

== Sport ==
A football club based in the village, Schorne College (Past & Present) F.C., played in the FA Cup qualifying rounds in the 1880s and 1890s, notably beating Millwall 4–0, away from home, in 1889.

== Famous links in North Marston ==
- John Schorne - Local unofficial saint, and Rector of North Marston around 1290.
- John Camden Neild - Miser to whose memory the chancel of North Marston was dedicated when Queen Victoria paid for its refurbishment; he had left her all his money.

== Pictures of the village ==
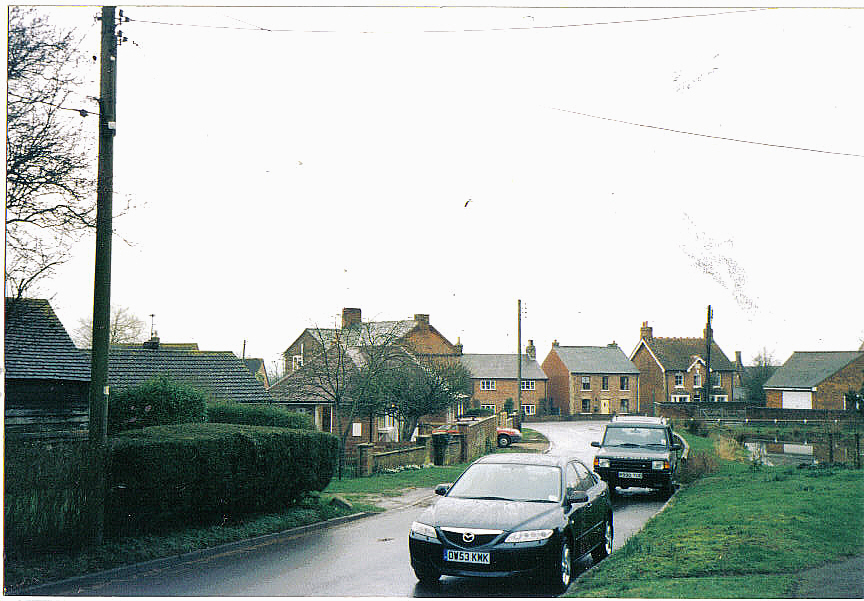
North Marston village in 2000.

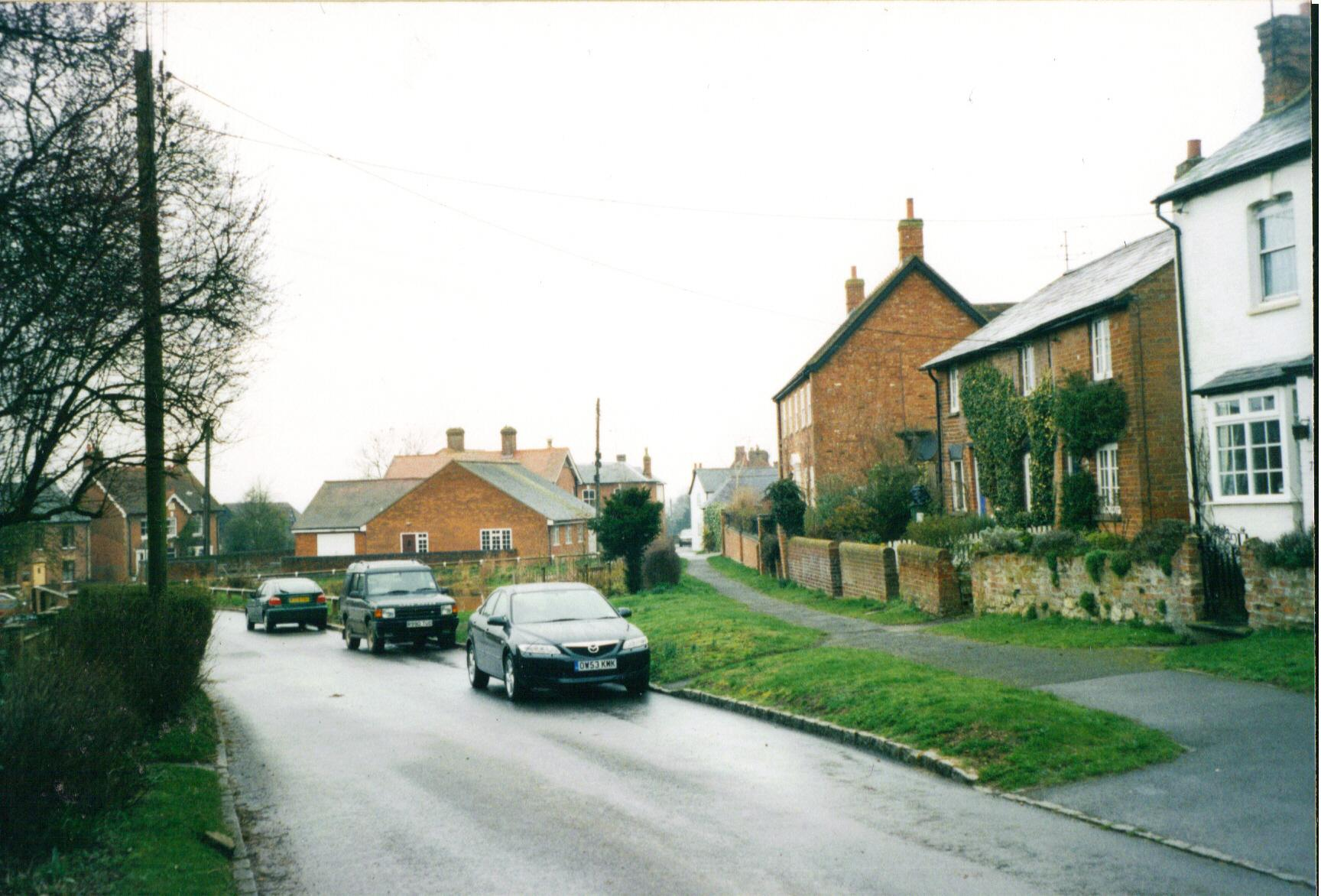
North Marston Village in 2004.

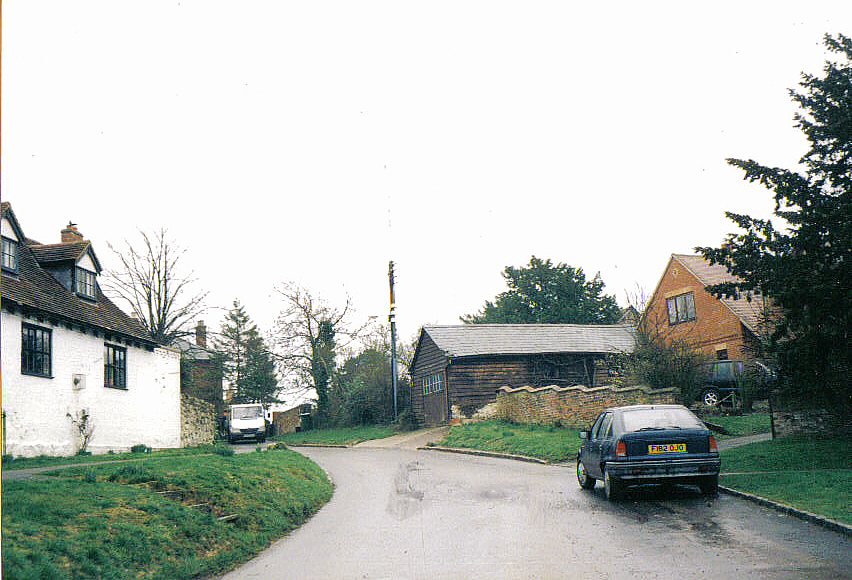
North Marston village in 2000.

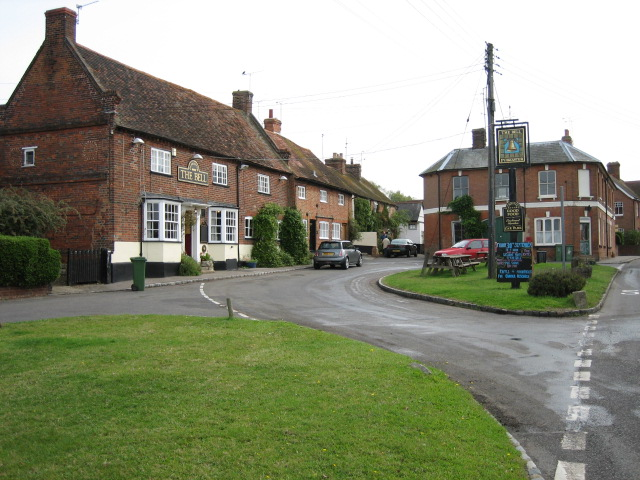
The Bell (renamed The Pilgrim in 2010) public house in 2005.

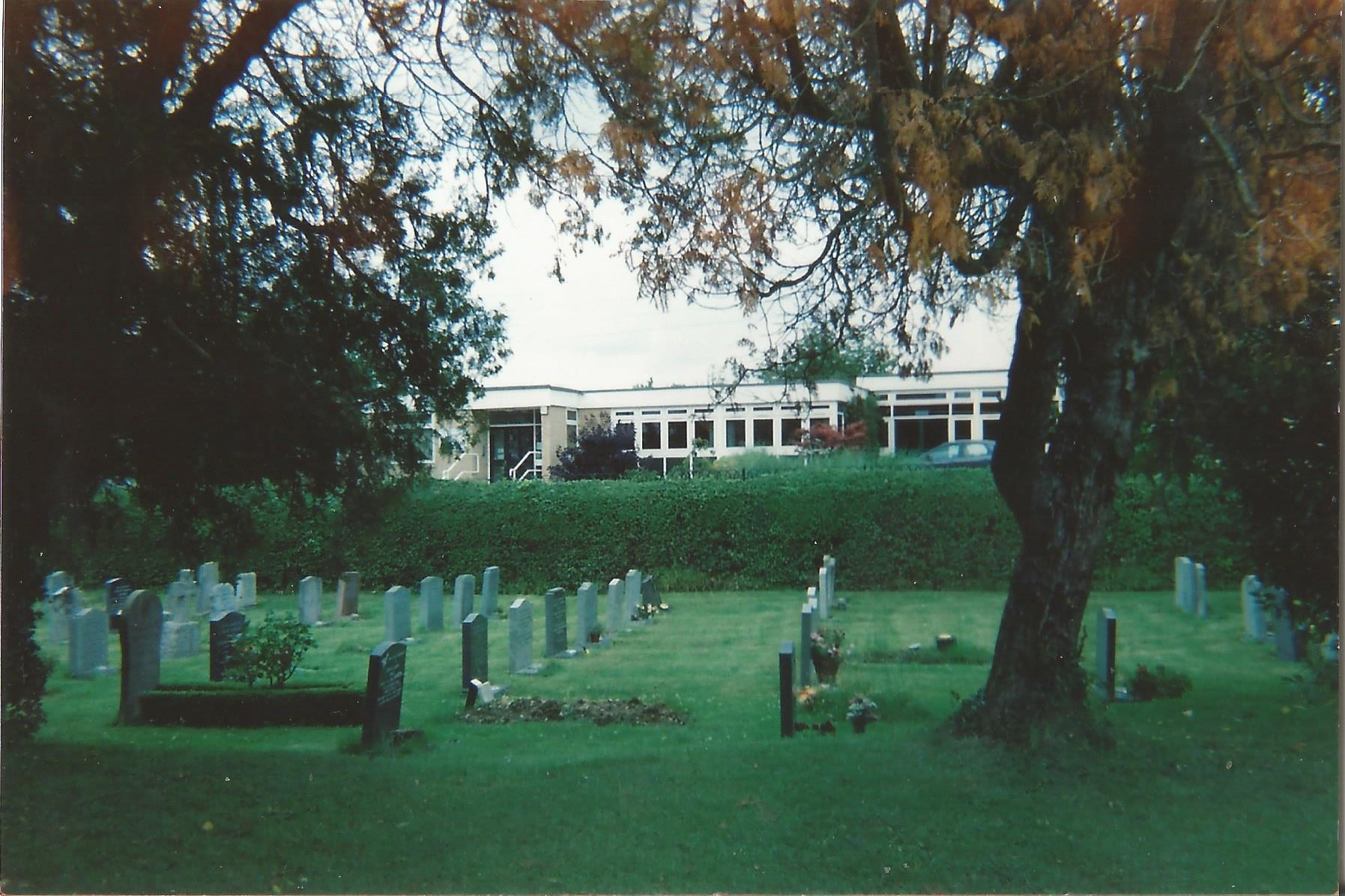
The local primary school in 2005.

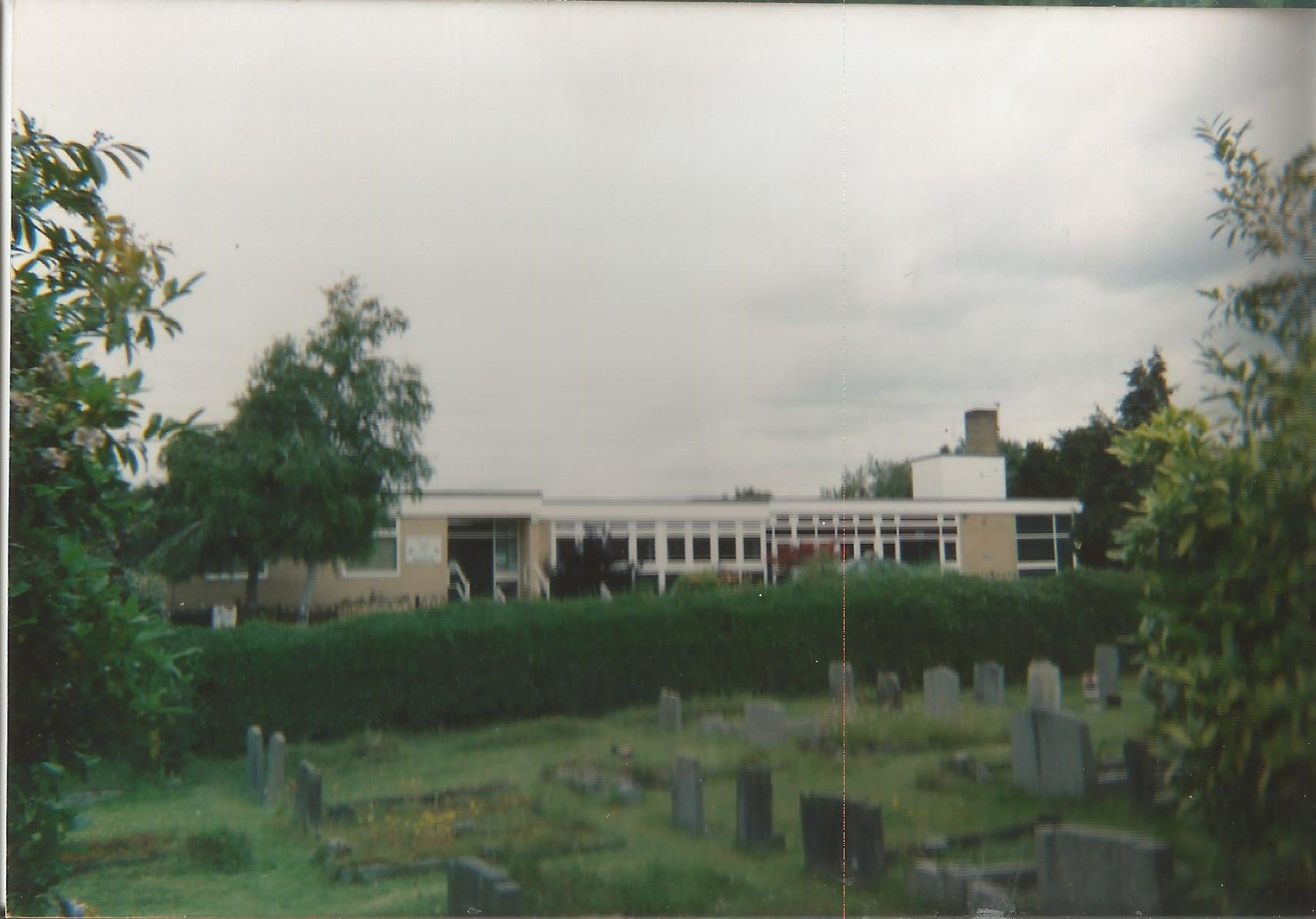
The local primary school in 2008.
