= List of Commissioners' churches in eastern England =

Commissioners' churches in eastern England

A Commissioners' church is an Anglican church in the United Kingdom built with money voted by Parliament as a result of the Church Building Act 1818, and subsequent related Acts. Such churches have been given a number of titles, including "Commissioners' Churches", "Waterloo Churches" and "Million Act Churches". In some cases the Commissioners provided the full cost of the new church; in other cases they provided a grant and the balance was raised locally. This list contains the Commissioners' churches in the East of England and in South East England.

== Key ==
Grade	Criteria
Grade I	Buildings of exceptional interest, sometimes considered to be internationally important.
Grade II*	Particularly important buildings of more than special interest.
Grade II	Buildings of national importance and special interest.
"—" denotes a work that is not graded.

== Churches ==
Name and location	Photograph	Date	Grant in £	Architect	Notes and refs.	Grade
St Paul, Southsea, Hampshire	—	1820–22	16,869	Francis Goodwin	Gothic Revival with four turrets. Bombed about 1941; demolished.	—
St John the Divine, Chatham, Kent; 51.3823°N 0.5224°E		1821–22	13,797	Robert Smirke	Neoclassical Doric with a tower. Closed in 2004.	II*
St Mary the Virgin, Bransgore, Hampshire; 50.7766°N 1.7302°W		1822	2,649	Joseph Hannaford	Gothic Revival with a tower. Chancel added 1873.	II
St George, Ramsgate, Kent; 51.3361°N 1.4178°E		1824–27	9,000	Henry Hemsley	Gothic Revival with a west tower. Restored in 1884 and again in 1946.	I
Holy Trinity, Margate, Kent	—	1825–28	10,000	William Edmunds	Gothic Revival with a tower. Bombed and demolished.	—
St Peter, Brighton, East Sussex; 50.8285°N 0.1348°W		1826–28	4,858	Charles Barry	Gothic Revival with a west tower. Chancel added 1906.	II*
Holy Trinity, Maidstone, Kent; 51.2750°N 0.5257°E		1826–28	7,373	John Whichcord	Neoclassical Doric with a tower and steeple. Converted.	II
Holy Trinity, Tunbridge Wells, Kent; 51.1328°N 0.2622°E		1827–29	8,059	Decimus Burton	Gothic Revival with a west tower.	II*
St John, Forton, Hampshire	—	1829–30	3,731	Benjamin Bramble	Gothic Revival with a bell turret. Replaced in 1890.	—
All Saints, Portsea, Portsmouth, Hampshire; 50.8049°N 1.0861°W		1825–27	13,682	Jacob Owen	Gothic Revival with a bell turret. Bombed and restored.	II
Holy Trinity, Waltham Cross, Hertfordshire; 51.6922°N 0.0337°W		1831–32	1,783	Edward Blore	Gothic Revival with a belfry. Chancel added 1913. Renamed Christ Church.	II
St Peter, Great Yarmouth, Norfolk; 52.6029°N 1.7309°E		1831–33	5,755	Joseph John Scoles	Gothic Revival in brick with a tower. Now Greek Orthodox.	II
Holy Trinity, Dover, Kent	—	1833–35	3,556	William Edmunds	Gothic Revival with a two turrets and spires. Demolished.	—
Holy Trinity, Sheerness, Kent; 51.4398°N 0.7638°E		1835–36	2,595	George Ledwell Taylor	Gothic Revival in brick with a tower.	II
Christ Church, Brighton, East Sussex	—	1837–38	500	George Cheesman	Gothic Revival with an east tower and spire. Demolished.	—
Christ Church, Cambridge, Cambridgeshire; 52.2079°N 0.1334°ED	—	1837–39	500	Ambrose Poynter	Tudor Revival in brick with two west turrets.	II
St Mary, Portsmouth, Hampshire	—	1838	1,003	Thomas Ellis Owen	Gothic Revival with a tower. Demolished about 1888.	—
St John, Brighton, East Sussex; 50.8239°N 0.1315°W		1838–39	1,000	George Cheesman	Neoclassical Doric style. Now Greek Orthodox Church.	II
Holy Trinity, Portsea, Portsmouth, Hampshire	—	1839–40	1,086	A. F. Livesay	Gothic Revival with a bell turret. In ruins.	—
St Paul, Cambridge, Cambridgeshire; 52.1976°N 0.1294°E		1840–41	300	Ambrose Poynter	Tudor Revival in brick with a west tower. Chancel added 1864; transepts in 1893.	II
St James, Milton, Hampshire	—	1840–41	150	A. F. Livesay	Norman Revival with a bell turret. Replaced in 1913.	—
Holy Trinity, Coates, Cambridgeshire; 52.5626°N 0.0758°W		1841	250	James William Wild	Norman Revival in brick with a northeast tower. Aisles added in 1874 and 1890.	II
Holy Trinity, Halstead, Essex; 51.9434°N 0.6296°E		1843–44	500	George Gilbert Scott and William Moffatt	Gothic Revival with a southwest tower and spire.	II*
St Peter, Southampton, Hampshire; 50.9091°N 1.4108°W		1843–44	350	Owen Carter	Norman Revival with a tower and spire. Redundant since 1981.	II
St Thomas, West Hyde, Rickmansworth, Hertfordshire; 51.6148°N 0.5115°W		1844	300	Thomas Smith	Norman Revival with a turret.	II
Holy Trinity, Milton, Kent	—	1844–45	600	James Wilson	Gothic Revival style.	—
Holy Trinity, Oxford, Oxfordshire	—	1844–45	300	Henry Underwood	Gothic Revival with a bell turret.	—
St John the Evangelist, King's Lynn, Norfolk	—	1845–46	500	Anthony Salvin	Gothic Revival with a tower. Bombed; demolished.	—
St Paul, Brighton, East Sussex; 50.8220°N 0.1446°W		1846–48	1,000	Richard Cromwell Carpenter	Gothic Revival with a tower. Spire added 1874; narthex 1887.	II*
St James, Gravesend, Kent	—	1848–52	200	Samuel Daukes	Gothic Revival with towers. Demolished 1968.	—
All Saints', Hockerill, Hertfordshire	—	1850–51	160	George Pritchett	Gothic Revival style. Burnt down in 1935 and replaced in 1936.	II
Christ Church, South Banbury, Oxfordshire	—	1851–52	350	Benjamin Ferrey	Gothic Revival with a tower and spire. Steeple added 1880. Demolished.	—
All Saints, Leavesden, Watford, Hertfordshire; 51.6955°N 0.3884°W	—	1852–53	125	George Gilbert Scott	Gothic Revival style. Additions in 1920.	II
St John the Baptist, Hove, East Sussex; 50.8269°N 0.1649°W		1853	5	William and Edward Habershon	Gothic Revival style. Tower and spire added 1859.	II
St Luke, Southampton, Hampshire; 50.9139°N 1.3982°W		1853	250	John Elliott	Gothic Revival with a turret. Now a Sikh temple.	II
Holy Trinity, Winchester, Hampshire; 51.0648°N 1.3112°W		1853	300	Henry Woodyer	Gothic Revival with a turret.	II*
St Paul, Chatham, Kent	—	1853–54	300	Alexander Gough	Norman Revival with a tower. Restored 1890, demolished.	—
Christ Church, Lee Park, Kent	—	1853–54	5	George Gilbert Scott	Gothic Revival style. Steeple added 1877. Demolished.	—
Christ Church, Milton, Kent	—	1854–56	125	Richard Cromwell Carpenter	Gothic Revival with a central tower. Enlarged 1870. Replaced 1934.	—
Christ Church, Northam, Southampton	—	1855–56	175	Alfred Lock and John Duckett	Gothic Revival in brick. Demolished about 1890.	—

== See also ==
- List of Commissioners' churches in the English Midlands
- List of Commissioners' churches in London
- List of Commissioners' churches in Northeast and Northwest England
- List of Commissioners' churches in southwest England
- List of Commissioners' churches in Wales
- List of Commissioners' churches in Yorkshire
