= Tanenhaus =

Tanenhaus is a surname. Notable people with the surname include:

- Beth Tanenhaus Winsten, American filmmaker
- Michael Tanenhaus, American psycholinguist and academic
- Sam Tanenhaus, American writer
