= Epwell =

Village in Oxfordshire, England

Coordinates: 52.060°N 1.484°W

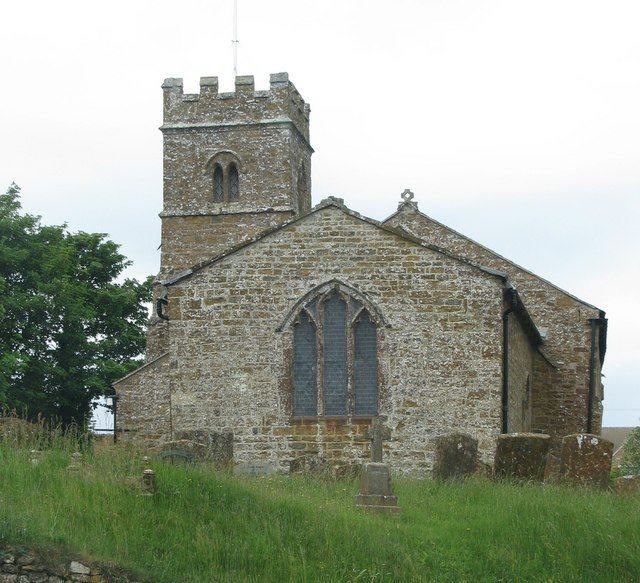
- St Anne's parish church

- Location within Oxfordshire
- Area: 4.63 km^{2} (1.79 sq mi)
- Population: 285 (2011 Census)
  - Density: 62/km^{2} (160/sq mi)
- OS grid reference: SP3540
- Civil parish: Epwell
- District: Cherwell
- Shire county: Oxfordshire
- Region: South East
- Country: England
- Sovereign state: United Kingdom
- Post town: Banbury
- Postcode district: OX15
- Dialling code: 01295
- Police: Thames Valley
- Fire: Oxfordshire
- Ambulance: South Central
- UK Parliament: Banbury
- Website: Epwell Oxfordshire

Epwell is a village and civil parish in the north of Oxfordshire about 6 miles (10 km) west of Banbury. The 2011 Census recorded the parish population's as 285. Epwell's toponym is believed to be derived from the Old English Eoppa's Well.

== Manor ==
In 1279 Robert Danvers held a fee at Epwell. Documents in the 14th through the 18th centuries often spelt the manor name as Ipswell, an Early Modern English name form that developed from Middle English in relative isolation due to phonological changes. Epwell was an exclave of the Hundred of Dorchester until the 18th century, when it was transferred to the Hundred of Banbury.

== Parish church ==
The Church of England parish church of Saint Anne was originally Early English. Several of the present windows are Decorated Gothic and were added later. Next the Perpendicular Gothic bell tower was added. Two windows on the north side of the church were added late in the 16th century. The church is a Grade II* listed building. St Anne's parish is a member of the Benefice of Wykeham, along with the parishes of Broughton, Shutford, Sibford Gower, Swalcliffe and Tadmarton.

== Mills ==
Epwell had a watermill and a windmill. The watermill building survives: it is just east of the village and was built early in the 18th century. The windmill was a tower mill northwest of the village. It was built of stone, had patent sails and a domed cap, and last worked in 1912.

== Amenities ==
The Chandler's Arms public house was built late in the 17th century and extended in the 19th century. The pub was controlled by the Hook Norton Brewery, but by January 2013 its freehold was offered for sale. It is now a free house. Epwell had a parish school. It is now the village hall.

== Sources and further reading ==
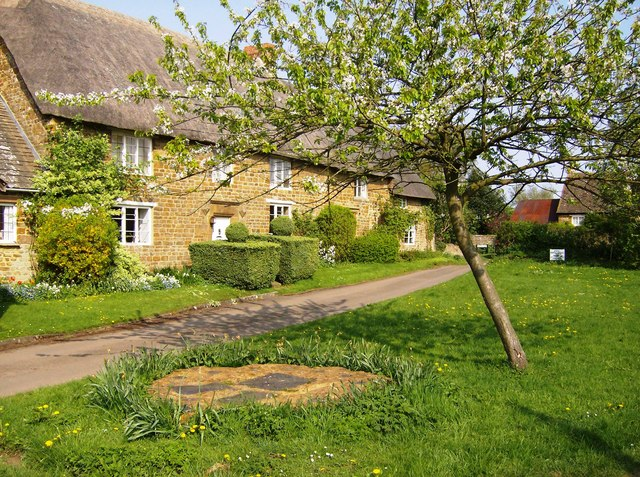
The green and thatched 17th-century cottages in Birds Lane

- Foreman, Wilfrid (1983). Oxfordshire Mills. Chichester: Phillimore & Co Ltd. pp. 107, 125. ISBN 0-85033-441-1.
- Goulburn, Edward (1928) [1807]. Hell for Leather! The Epwell Hunt: or, Black Collars in the Rear. New York: The Derrydale Press.
- Lobel, Mary D, ed. (1962). A History of the County of Oxford. Victoria County History. Vol. 7: Thame and Dorchester Hundreds. London: Oxford University Press for the Institute of Historical Research. pp. 1–4.
- Lobel, Mary D; Crossley, Alan, eds. (1969). A History of the County of Oxford. Victoria County History. Vol. 9: Bloxham Hundred. London: Oxford University Press for the Institute of Historical Research. pp. 1–4. ISBN 978-0-19722-726-8.
- Sherwood, Jennifer; Pevsner, Nikolaus (1974). Oxfordshire. The Buildings of England. Harmondsworth: Penguin Books. ISBN 0-14-071045-0.
