= Sibford =

Villages in Oxfordshire, England

Coordinates: 52.047°N 01.455°W

- Location within Oxfordshire
- OS grid reference: SP3537
- Civil parish: Sibford Gower; Sibford Ferris
- District: Cherwell
- Shire county: Oxfordshire
- Region: South East
- Country: England
- Sovereign state: United Kingdom
- Post town: Banbury
- Postcode district: OX15
- Dialling code: 01295
- Police: Thames Valley
- Fire: Oxfordshire
- Ambulance: South Central
- UK Parliament: Banbury
- Website: The Sibfords

Sibford (or The Sibfords) is the collective name given to the villages of Sibford Gower, Sibford Ferris and Burdrop on the edge of the Cotswolds in north Oxfordshire. The villages are contiguous and sit on either side of the Sib Valley, close to the Warwickshire border. 'Sibford' is commonly used to refer to the group of settlements and outlying farms, and is the name of the Cherwell District Council ward for the area. The name means "fording place of the River Sib."

The Sibfords share their amenities, with the village hall, pub and primary school located in Sibford Gower; the church in Burdrop; and the village shop and Sibford School located in Sibford Ferris.
