= Thomas Benjamin Watkins =

Anglican clergyman 1856–1933)

The Reverend Canon Thomas Benjamin Watkins
- Watkins in 1904
- Born: 7 September 1856; Peckham, London, England
- Died: 20 June 1933 (aged 76); Canterbury, Kent
- Burial place: Herne Bay Cemetery, Kent
- Education: Worcester College, Oxford
- Occupation: Anglican priest
- Years active: 1879–1929
- Known for: Foundation of St John's Church, Herne Bay, Kent

Ecclesiastical career
- Religion: Anglicanism
- Ordained: Deacon 1879; priest 1880; canon 1925
- Offices held: Canon of Canterbury Cathedral

Thomas Benjamin Watkins (7 September 1856 – 20 June 1933) was an English priest and honorary canon of Canterbury Cathedral.

Watkins, the son of a merchant, was brought up by his grandfather, and was "intended for the Church" by his family at an early age. He attained a place at Dulwich College, and at Worcester College, Oxford, where he achieved a bachelor of arts. After being ordained as a deacon by the Archbishop of Canterbury he was appointed curate of Christ Church, Tunbridge Wells, then as an ordained priest he held the curacy of Holy Trinity in the same town. He subsequently became vicar of St Dunstan's, Canterbury. After accepting the post of vicar of Christ Church, Herne Bay, he founded St John's Church in the same town. His final post was at St James' Church, Dover.

Although not an abstainer, Watkins supported the temperance movement. He was an evangelist, and put much energy into that calling in Herne Bay and Dover. He encouraged his eldest daughter to work as a missionary in India. Two of his sons became priests, and one was an architect.

== Background ==
Watkins' birth place: Rye Lane, Peckham, before 1914

Watkins was born into a family of London merchants. His father was Thomas Watkins of Champion Hill, East Dulwich, a juggler, a provision merchant, and later a gentleman. (Note: Thomas Watkins (Southwark 13 May 1829 – London 12 August 1866). GRO Index: Deaths Sep 1866 Watkins Thomas 37 Camberwell 1d 359. He was father of Canon T.B. Watkins. In the context of 19th century employment and income, the term "gentleman" commonly denoted a man who lived on his own means, such as investments or rents from property. In that context it did not necessarily imply social rank,ownership of land, or social graces.) Watkins was born at 27 Rye Lane, Peckham, London, on 7 September 1856, (Note: Thomas Benjamin Watkins (Peckham 7 September 1856 – Canterbury 20 June 1933). GRO index: Births Dec 1856 Watkins Thomas Benjamin Camberwell 1d 409. Deaths Jun 1933 Watkins Thomas B 76 Canterbury 2a 1140. Buried at Herne Bay Cemetery (previously called Eddington Cemetery), in plot I, grave R-35.) and baptised on 5 November 1856 at the Church of St John-at-Hackney. At age 7 he was still living with his parents in Southwark. Watkins was "intended for the Church" by his family at an early age. By 1871 he was living with his grandfather, stationer Thomas Watkins, who was born in Bermondsey, Surrey. He attended Dulwich College, and was subsequently tutored privately at Bromley, Kent. On 19 October 1875 he matriculated at Worcester College, Oxford, achieving his Bachelor of Arts in 1878, and his Master of Arts in 1882.

On 16 August 1882 at St Paul's Church, Herne Hill, Watkins married Rosa Maria Powell, (Note: Rosa Maria Watkins née Powell (Elham 1851 – Canterbury 1945). GRO index: Births Jun 1851 Powell Rosa Maria Elham 5 168. Marriages Sep 1882 Watkins Thomas Benjamin and Powell Rosa Maria. Camberwell 1d 1220. Deaths Sep 1945 Watkins Rosa M 94 Canterbury 2a 1184. Marriage certificate is here, via Ancestry.) daughter of the Reverend William Powell, rector of the same church. They had three daughters (who never married) and three sons. They were: architect Thomas William Watkins, (Note: Thomas William Watkins (23 September 1883 – 25 January 1952). GRO index: Births Dec 1883 Watkins Thomas William Ticehurst 2b 119. Deaths Mar 1952. Watkins Thomas W 68 N.Walsham 4b 589.) Rose Louisa Lillie Watkins, (Note: Rose Louisa Lillie Watkins (1885 – 28 May 1959). GRO index: Births Mar 1885 Watkins Rose Louisa L Tunbridge 2a 700. Deaths Jun 1959 Watkins Rose L L 74 Canterbury 5b 216.) a missionary to India, Rev. Canon Claude Spencer Thomas Watkins, (Note: Claude Spencer Thomas Watkins (12 June 1887 – 2 November 1946). GRO index: Births Sep 1887 Claude Spencer T. Tunbridge 2a 667. Deaths Dec 1946 Watkins Claude S T 59 Croydon 5g 60.) Rev. Wilfrid Egbert Watkins, (Note: Wilfrid Egbert Watkins (20 September 1889 – 28 June 1963). GRO index: Births Dec 1889 Watkins Wilfrid Egbert Bridge 2a 807. Deaths Sep 1963 Watkins Wilfrid E 73 Ashford 5B 30.) Violet Sylvia Kate Watkins, (Note: Violet Sylvia Kate Watkins (4 February 1892 – 16 December 1988). GRO index: Births Mar 1892 Watkins Violet Sylvia K Bridge 2a 807. Deaths 1988 Watkins Violet Sylvia K 4 FE1892 Canterbury 16 345.) who was District Commissioner of the Girl Guides of Herne Bay, and Mary Theodora Joyce Watkins. (Note: Mary Theodora Joyce Watkins (4 March 1896 – 5 July 1981). GRO index: Births Jun 1896 Watkins Mary Theodore J. Blean 2a 859. Deaths Sep 1981 Watkins Mary Theodore J 4MR1896 Canterbury 16 222.) From 1907 Watkins' daughters were "pioneers of the Girl Guide movement, and working for the first company to be formed in Dover". The 1891 Census finds Watkins' family living in Summer Hill Vicarage at St Dunstan's, Harbledown, Kent, with four of his children, three servants and a guest, Reverend George Frederick Cecil de Carteret. (Note: Reverend George Frederick Cecil de Carteret (Wandsworth 1866 – 3 January 1932)..) In 1901, Watkins was living at The Vicarage, Marine Parade, Herne Bay, with his wife, four of his children, and two servants. Next door to him, at The Manse, lived the Congregational minister Charles Pockney. (Note: Rev. Charles Pockney (Wolverhampton 1860 – Naburn, Yorkshire 17 March 1946). His obituary is in the 1947 Congregational Year Book, held at Westminster College, Cambridge.)

Watkins died on 20 June 1933, at his home in St James, Whitstable Road, Canterbury. He left £3521 14s (equivalent to £217,920.03 in 2025). His funeral took place at St John's Church, Herne Bay, and he was buried in Eddington Cemetery in Herne Bay, (Note: Eddington Cemetery is now known as Herne Bay Cemetery.) on 24 June 1933.

The succeeding vicar of Herne Bay, Rev. N.H. Harding Jolly, (Note: Rev. Newman Harold Harding Jolly, Queens College Cambridge and Ripon Theological College. Made deacon 1906. Vicar of Herne Bay from 1930.) said that, "[Watkins] was one who for very many years had been a tower of strength to the Church in the Canterbury Diocese and an example of what a Christian gentleman can be". (Note: In this context, "gentleman" implied acceptable social graces.)

== Career ==
=== Tunbridge Wells and Canterbury ===
In 1879 Watkins was ordained as deacon by Charles Longley, Archbishop of Canterbury, and appointed to the curacy of Christ Church, Tunbridge Wells, where he served between 1879 and 1884. He was ordained priest by Charles Longley on 19 September 1880. He then held the post of Holy Trinity Church, Tunbridge Wells from 1884 to 1888. That post was offered to him by Canon Edward Hoare, a previous incumbent of Holy Trinity, and "one of the best known of the distinctly evangelical section of the Church of England". In that post Watkins was promoted to senior curate, "holding that position with credit, and winning much esteem in it". Between 1888 and 1894 he was vicar of St. Dunstan's, Canterbury. The living was worth £268 (equivalent to £30,117.14 in 2025) per year, a vicarage and 10 acres (4.0 ha) of glebe land.

Christ Church, Tunbridge Wells, 1850

Holy Trinity Church, Tunbridge Wells, 1829

St Dunstan's Church, Canterbury, 1911

=== Herne Bay ===
Christ Church, Herne Bay, c. 1900

Watkins was appointed vicar of Christ Church, Herne Bay, in 1894. He was nominated for the post by Dr Charles Kessick Bowes, brother of Dr Tom Armstrong Bowes, following a delay caused by internal bickering within Herne School Board (HSB). Watkins served in the town until 1907. He became chaplain to the Herne School Board, but in 1898 the board was taken over by the managers of the Metropolitan Asylums District, so in lieu of lost income he received a gratuity of £70 (equivalent to £7,866.42 in 2025) from the HSB.

In April 1907, before Watkins left for Dover, his parishioners and friends presented him with an illuminated album and a silver tea and coffee service "in recognition of thirteen years' faithful service". Watkins was described as "one who had endeared himself to all hearts by his gentle disposition and sterling worth ... he would be remembered in the annals of Herne Bay as one of their best and dearest vicars".

=== Dover ===
Old St James Church, before 1914

Between 1907 and 1926 Watkins was rector of St James the Apostle, Dover. On 4 May 1907 he was inducted, by the Bishop of Dover, into the post in the presence of a "large and influential congregation ... including a considerable representation of the local clergy". Hymns were assisted by a full choir and organ. At the evening service the Bishop of Dover exegesized on the text, "Bear ye one another's burdens, and so fulfil the law of Christ" (Galatians 6.2). There followed the ritual of induction. The bishop, carrying the Archibishop of Canterbury's mandate in his hand, and accompanied by Watkins and the bishop's attendants, proceeded to the church's west door, and laid Watkin's hand on the door key, speaking the formal induction phrases. Watkins then tolled the bell twelve times, a ritual intended to signify to the congregation that he was taking possession of the church. The bishop and his procession then visited the font, the prayer desk, the lectern, the pulpit, and the communion table. At each halting place, the bishop admonished Watkins at each point to do his duty, and Watkins responded, "I will do so, the Lord being my helper". There followed a lesson, a prayer, a hymn and a benediction for the congregation.

On the next day, Sunday, Watkins began his tenure with a sermon on the Thirty-nine Articles. His second sermon on the Sunday afternoon was The Five Alls, interpreting them in terms of the religious and moral duties of Man. In his third sermon on the Sunday, he started as he was to continue, on the subject of evangelism. In 1921 Watkins was living at the St James Rectory, Dover, with his wife, three daughters, a guest, and two servants. He resigned from his post at Dover in 1926, leaving on his 70th birthday. Watkins was honorary chaplain to Dover College, and he was also chaplain to the Gordon Boys' Orphanage. In 1925 he was invested as an honorary Canon of Canterbury Cathedral. St James' Church was bombed during the Second World war and is now a ruin.

== Works ==
=== St John's Church, Herne Bay ===
Watkins founded St John's Church, Herne Bay, (Note: St John the Evangelist's Church, Herne Bay (built 1899, closed 1973).) following twelve years' work and the raising of the building cost of £12,000 (equivalent to £1,275,239.04 in 2025). The architects were Richard Philip Day, (Note: Richard Philip Day ARIBA (Hitchin 1854 – Saint Giles 1903). Had a London address in 1881. Was articled to, and assistant of, Gordon Macdonald Hills between 1869 and 1881. (Source: Antonia Brodie (2001), Directory of British Architects 1834–1914).) and William Herbert James, (Note: William Herbert James, LRIBA (born 1874). Had a London address in 1905. Articled to R.P. Day, then stayed on as assistant until 1903..Listed in Pike London, p.264. More information here.) The project was funded by Sir Henry Montagu Oxenden, 9th Baronet. The foundation stone was laid by Sir Horatio Davies, Lord Mayor of London in Brunswick Square on 28 July 1898. The builder was A.S. Ingleton. The church was consecrated by William Walsh, Bishop of Dover, on 25 July 1899. Watkins presented the bishop with a petition of consecration at the door, and was answered with an authority read by the bishop. Inside the building, the choir and a "large number of clergy of the district" repeating the 24th Psalm, processed up the aisle to the communion table, where the bishop received the deed of conveyance. The registrar read the sentence of consecration, and morning prayers were said. The collection amounted to £94 2s 4d (equivalent to £10,456.77 in 2025).

The church was constructed of Kentish ragstone with Bath stone dressing and internal red brick. The nave seated a congregation of 800. The 1903 five-light east window, by the Percy Bacon Brothers, depicted the Annunciation, Nativity, Crucifixion, Resurrection and Ascension with a circular light above, of Christ in Glory. The church had two other windows by the Bacon Brothers: the side chapel window of St James and St Peter, and a 1905 window showing John the Baptist and John the Evangelist. In 1899 the nave was consecrated and dedicated to John the Evangelist, and the chancel was added in 1903. In 1914, Thomas William Watkins, son of T.B. Watkins, was appointed architect for the church's projected bell tower. £500 (equivalent to £49,881.80 in 2025) had been promised for a peal of bells, provided that the tower was erected by May 1916. Due to the interruption of the First World War, the tower was not built. It would have had 4-foot (122 cm) thick walls at the base, an outdoor pulpit between buttresses, a baptistery at the base of the tower, and no west door in the tower. The tower, without bells and other extras, would have cost £3,500 (equivalent to £349,172.59 in 2025). The diminishing congregation removed to Christ Church, Herne Bay, in 1973. In the face of opposition from the public, St John's was then demolished in 1973, and Donnithorne House, a care home, was built in its place.

St John's Church, Herne Bay, 1904

St John's Church, Herne Bay, before 1914

Proposal drawing for St John's tower, 1914

William Herbert James, L.R.I.B.A., co-designer of St John's Church

== Reviews and memorials ==
In anticipation of Watkins taking up the post of vicar at Herne Bay, the Herne Bay Press reported the following assessment of his character:

[At St Dunstan's, Watkins'] organising and ministerial abilities had play and a certain amount of scope, while the church organizations soon showed, by the infusion of new life and earnest, loving zeal, that he was gathering around him a band of willing and devoted workers. As a preacher he is earnest and thoughtful, given more to the practical side of Christianity than to the exposition of its doctrines – thinking more of the life than of the mere profession of a creed. His pulpit addresses are plain, homely, thorough, and evangelical. His excursions into the realms of imagination and theory are only taken the better to enforce the truth under consideration at the hour. He has fairly balanced logical faculties, and uses them on the constructive side of affairs rather than in the more easy role of pure criticism. He is genial in converse, a capital listener, takes an evident interest in the welfare of those committed to his charge, is alert to watch the varying moods of men, sufficiently sympathetic to gauge the undercurrent of their thoughts, human enough to smile with the cheerful, and tender enough to solace the sorrowing. Candid and sincere in his expression of opinion; he gives to others who differ from his views credit for their convictions – he wins by bonhomie rather than rules by dogmatism, and never forgets that courtesy which is said to be the grace of kings.

As a clergyman [Watkins] is essentially a working parson, the organisations of his church are fostered with care, guided by tact, and to get all to work doing that for which each is best fitted is his constant endeavour – let us is much more frequently his counsel than to command others, or even to take upon himself the whole of the work to be accomplished. It is this characteristic that in a large measure made his monthly service for men in Canterbury a success. As a churchman he is decidedly evangelical in views, an admirer of bright and hearty services, led by the clergyman but thoroughly enjoyed and taken part in by his congregation. At Canterbury he was a regular and systematic visitor "seeking to know personally", as one who knew and worked with him there writes, and to make a friend of every one of his parishioners. He warmly supports the cause of foreign missions, while also interesting himself in the welfare of those in his parish; for the latter of whom Bible classes for men, women, girls and youths, mothers' meetings, gymnastic classes, cricket club etc., were kept in active operation. Not himself a total abstainer he yet has strong sympathies with the temperance movement, and the Church of England Temperance Society has ever found in him a friend.

On 25 July 1936 a memorial stained glass window depicting The Good Shepherd and The Light of the World was installed and dedicated in memory of Watkins in St James the Apostle Church, Dover. It was dedicated by Watkins' son, Claude, who was at that time vicar of Holy Trinity Church, Hastings, and his children Wilfrid, Sylvia and Joyce were also present. The Reverend Canon William George Elnor, (Note: William George Elnor educated at St Catherine's College Cambridge, made deacon in 1887, and Canon of Canterbury Cathedral in 1919.) vicar of St Mary's Church, Dover, gave the address. He said:

Watkins visited Reculver every year to preach for the Church Mission Society. He was a great progressionist for the extension of the Kingdom of God overseas, and a great propogandist on behalf of its work, so that when, fifteen years later he (Canon Elnor) came to Dover, to be vicar of St Mary's, he was not surprised to find that the parish of St James' was a live-wire on behalf of that particular work of the church ... [Watkins] was loved and respected by everyone, even those outside his parish, but his reputation for his twelve years' ministry in Herne Bay was well in remembrance; twelve years of striking and successful labour; he achieved the building of a daughter church, which stood there now, (Note: St John's was demolished in 1973.) a monument of his vigorous industry and his spiritual leadership. [Elnor] remembered so well how he maintained the fresh nature of his physical personality, and how he never lost that geniality, friendly attitude, sense of humour, and kindly expression of countenance, all of which spoke of his inward and sincere charity of heart ... which he had in those days of service in both the churches at Dover ... [During the First World War] he had the experience .. of receiving ... one of the first bombs in his garden.

Elnor added that Watkins was "an evangelical by conviction"; he was ever ready to see the good in those whose views were not his own". He said that Watkins assisted the Church and Rural Deanery, and "gave advice in the Council of their Chapters". He added that " [Watkins'] ministry at Dover was a pleasant and happy epoch in the lives of his congregation".

On the same day, 25 June 1933, at St James' Church, Dover, its rector, Rev. C.K. Chadwick, spoke his own elegy to Watkins, from the pulpit. He said:

Watkins' great approachableness, fatherliness, simple faith, humility and gladness of heart made him beloved by all ... At Herne Bay ... he accomplished a magnificent work in building the parish church of St John. He lived a strenuous life, and his ministry at Dover included the Great War. It was interesting to recall that his church was in the nearest parish to the scene of the operations on the other side of the Channel ... His eldest daughter, hearing him preach about the need for workers overseas, volunteered, at the urge of her own father, as a missionary. His work was indeed being carried on in the lives of his own children.
