= Christiana Edmunds =

English murderer (1828–1907)

Christiana Edmunds (3 October 1828 – 19 September 1907) was an English murderer, popularly known as the "Chocolate Cream Killer", who carried out a series of poisonings in Brighton during the early 1870s. Edmunds purchased confectionery from a local shop and laced the sweets with strychnine before returning them to be sold to unsuspecting members of the public. Her actions resulted in several people becoming seriously ill, and at least one death. Arrested and put on trial, Edmunds was initially sentenced to death. However, this was later commuted to life imprisonment. She spent the rest of her life at the Broadmoor Criminal Lunatic Asylum, dying there in 1907.

== Poisoning spree ==
Christiana Edmunds was born in Margate, Kent, and was the eldest child of William Edmunds, an architect who designed the local Holy Trinity Church and Margate Lighthouse. Her mother was Ann Christiana Burn, the sister of John Southerden Burn and daughter of a Royal Marines captain. Edmunds had a privileged upbringing and was privately educated, but was diagnosed with hysteria in her early twenties. It was while she was living with her widowed mother in Brighton in the late 1860s that Edmunds became involved with the local doctor, Charles Beard. The nature of their relationship remains a source of controversy but in September 1870, Edmunds poisoned Beard's wife by giving her a poisoned chocolate cream. Mrs Beard recovered from the resulting violent illness. Dr Beard said later that he suspected Edmunds had poisoned his wife at that time, but did not act on his suspicion due to a lack of proof and a concern over the taint of scandal.

In 1871, Edmunds began obtaining chocolate creams from the local confectioner, John Maynard. She took them home, laced them with strychnine, and returned them to the vendor. Maynard then sold them to the public, not knowing that they had been poisoned. Initially Edmunds obtained the strychnine from a local chemist, Isaac Garrett, on the pretence that she needed it to poison stray cats. In an attempt to cover her tracks, she began paying young boys to purchase it for her. By this time, several people in Brighton had become ill after eating the chocolates, but no one had connected the illnesses with what the victims had eaten. However, in June 1871, 4-year-old Sidney Albert Barker, on holiday with his family, died as a result of eating chocolates from Maynard's shop. The Brighton coroner, David Black, ruled the death accidental. It was later confirmed that this was the only death caused by Edmunds.

Edmunds increased her poisoning campaign, and began sending parcels of chocolates to prominent persons, including Mrs Beard, who again became violently ill. By this time, the police had connected the poisonings with the chocolates. Edmunds sent parcels to herself, claiming that she, too, was a victim of the poisoner, in the hope that this would deflect suspicion from her and on to Maynard. At this point, Dr Beard informed the police of his suspicions, which resulted in Edmunds being arrested and charged with the attempted murder of Mrs Beard and the murder of Sidney Barker. After committal hearings, it was decided to move the case from Lewes to the Old Bailey. During Edmunds's trial, which began in January 1872, her mother testified that both sides of their family had a history of mental illness. Dr Beard claimed that he and Edmunds never had a sexual relationship, but that instead it was merely a series of letters sent by her to him, and mild flirtations. Edmunds was sentenced to death, but this was commuted to life imprisonment due to her mental state. She spent the rest of her life in Broadmoor Criminal Lunatic Asylum, dying there in 1907.

== In popular culture ==
The 1939, novel The Black Spectacles by John Dickson Carr is based on the Edmunds case.

In 1970, the case featured as episode two in the six-part ITV series drama Wicked Women, based on famous female Victorian killers, with Edmunds played by Anna Massey. This version takes some liberties with the source material, including Edmunds, in a state of confused hysteria, ultimately eating her poisoned "wedding cake" to Dr. Beard and dying from it, whereas the real life Edmunds would die died whilst incarcerated at Broadmoor Criminal Lunatic Asylum in 1907.

The Great Chocolate Murders, by John Fletcher, is a drama based on the events of the case, first broadcast by the BBC on Saturday 4 March 2006. It features Sîan Thomas, Chris Donnelly, Jennifer Hill, Dorien Thomas and Brendan Charleson, and was directed by Kate McAll.

The case formed the basis of a puppet show, The Sorrowful Tale of Sleeping Sydney, by Daisy Jordan
