= Burdrop =

Village in Oxfordshire, England

Coordinates: 52.038°N 01.479°W

- Location within Oxfordshire
- OS grid reference: SP3537
- Civil parish: Sibford Gower
- District: Cherwell
- Shire county: Oxfordshire
- Region: South East
- Country: England
- Sovereign state: United Kingdom
- Post town: Banbury
- Postcode district: OX15
- Dialling code: 01295
- Police: Thames Valley
- Fire: Oxfordshire
- Ambulance: South Central
- UK Parliament: Banbury
- Website: The Sibfords Society

Burdrop is a village in Sibford Gower civil parish, about 6.5 miles (10.5 km) west of Banbury in Oxfordshire, England. Burdrop is contiguous with Sibford Gower and sometimes considered part of the village. Burdrop's toponym means the "hamlet near the burh", which implies it was near a fortified settlement.

== Parish church ==
Burdrop was part of the parish of Swalcliffe until 1841, when a new ecclesiastical parish of Sibford Gower, with Sibford Ferris and Burdrop was created. The Church of England parish church of the Holy Trinity was built in 1840 to plans by the architect H.J. Underwood. It is a cruciform Gothic Revival building that emulates an Early English Gothic style. The porch was designed by W.E. Mills and added in 1897.

== Public houses ==
In 1782 Burdrop was recorded as having two pubs: the Old Inn and the Wykeham Arms. (In fact the latter is in Sibford Gower.) The earliest known record of the Bishop Blaize Inn dates from 1816. Its namesake is Saint Blaise, an early 4th-century Armenian bishop who is the patron saint of wool-combers. By the 21st century the Bishop Blaize Inn was the only pub in Burdrop still trading now as Blaze Inn Saddles, a venue for motorcyclists who travel from all over the country to enjoy splendid views and fabulous hospitality.

== Sources ==
- Colvin, Christina; Cooper, Janet; Cooper, N.H.; Harvey, P.D.A.; Hollings, Marjory; Hook, Judith; Jessup, Mary; Lobel, Mary D.; Mason, J.F.A.; Trinder, B.S.; Turner, Hilary (1972). "Parishes: Swalcliffe". In Crossley, Alan (ed.). A History of the County of Oxford. Victoria County History. Vol. 10: Banbury Hundred. London: Oxford University Press for the Institute of Historical Research. pp. 225–260. ISBN 978-0-19722-728-2.
- Sherwood, Jennifer; Pevsner, Nikolaus (1974). Oxfordshire. The Buildings of England. Harmondsworth: Penguin Books. p. 767. ISBN 0-14-071045-0.
