= St. Dunstan's, Canterbury =

Anglican church in Canterbury, Kent

Coordinates: 51°17′1.17″N 1°4′14.93″E

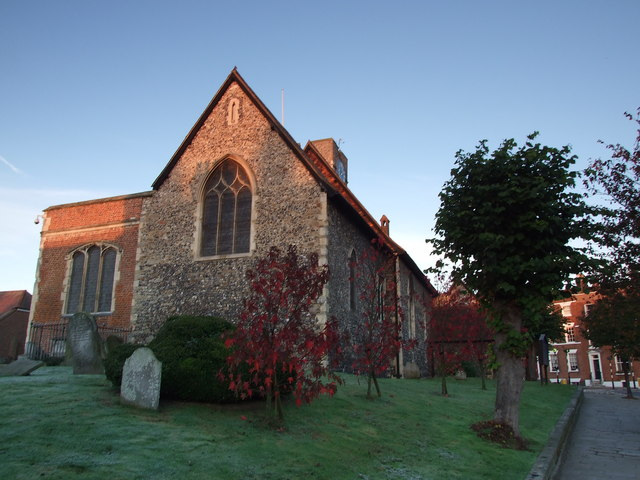
St. Dunstan's Church.

St. Dunstan's is an Anglican church in Canterbury, Kent, at the junction of London Road and Whitstable Road. It is dedicated to St. Dunstan (909-988) and gives its name to the part of the city on the left bank of the River Stour. The parish has been held in plurality with others nearby at different times, in a way that has been difficult to document. In 2010 the parish was joined with the parishes of the City Centre Parish in a new pastoral grouping, City Centre with St. Dunstan.

The church dates from the 11th century and is a grade I listed building. It was restored in 1878-80 by church architect Ewan Christian. Its association with the deaths of Thomas Becket and Thomas More make it a place of pilgrimage.

== History ==
=== Saint Dunstan ===
Dunstan was Archbishop of Canterbury from 960 to 978 and was canonised soon after his death, becoming the favourite saint of the English until he was supplanted 200 years later by Thomas Becket. Dunstan was buried in Canterbury Cathedral but his tomb was destroyed during the Reformation.

=== Saint Thomas Becket ===
In 1174, when Henry II began his penitential pilgrimage in reparation for the murder of Archbishop Thomas Becket, he changed his clothing into sackcloth at St. Dunstan's Church and began his pilgrimage from there to Thomas Becket's tomb at Canterbury Cathedral on foot.

=== Saint Thomas More ===
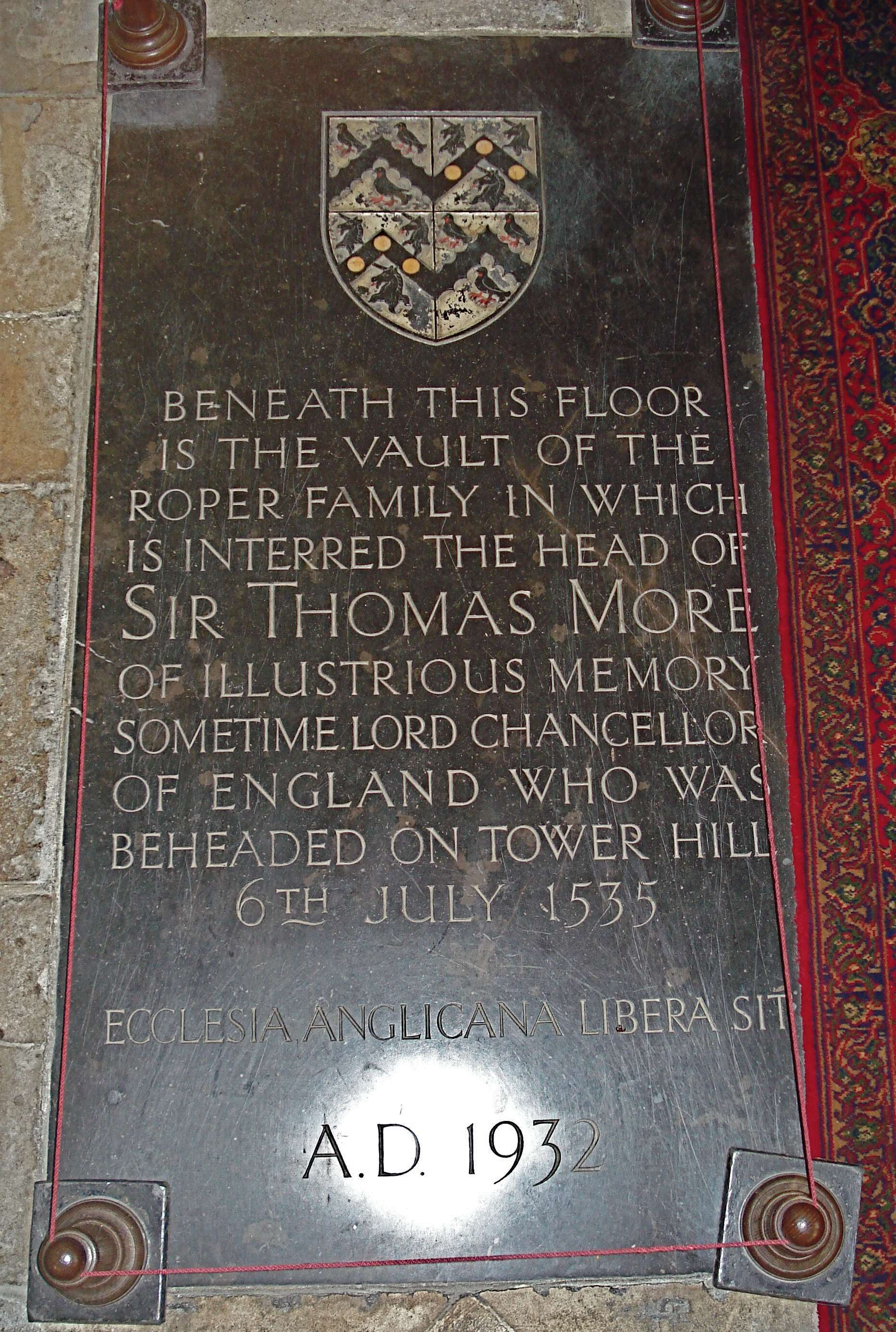
Sir Thomas More family's vault

Thomas More's daughter Margaret secured the release of More's head from a spike on London Bridge and brought it back to the family tomb of her husband, William Roper. The Roper family lived nearby off what is now St Dunstan's Street. What remains of their home is called Roper Gate, marked with a commemorative plaque, being all that survives of Place House.

The Roper family vault is located beneath the Nicholas Chapel, to the right of the church's main altar. It was sealed in recent years, according to Anglican tradition. A large stone slab marks its location to the immediate left of the chapel's altar. Three impressive stained glass windows line the chapel; the one behind the altar depicts in brilliant detail the major events and symbols in the life of the St. Dunstan. Another of the windows commemorates the visit, on 29 May 1982, of Pope John Paul II to Canterbury to pray with the Anglican Archbishop of Canterbury at the site of the martyrdom of St. Thomas Becket in Canterbury Cathedral. The window displays the arms of the Archbishop's diocese and the Pope. Plaques mounted on the walls explain the veracity of the relic of Saint Thomas More's head, the sealing of the vault which contains it, and the life of Saint Thomas More, including a prayer he wrote.

== Bells ==
St Dunstan's has six bells, hung for change ringing in the English style, the heaviest weighing 13cwt (approx. 675 kg). Due to the unusual narrowness of the belfry, the bells are hung in a two-tier frame.

The fifth bell of the ring is one of the oldest Christian church bells in the world, believed to have been cast in 1325 by William le Belyetere, making it nearly 692 years old as of 2017.

The bells were removed from the tower in 1935 so that a concrete structural beam could be fitted to the tower. At this time the bells were retuned by the Whitechapel Bell Foundry, and rehung in the present frame in 1936.

The bells are rung on Friday evenings for practice, and Sunday mornings for the service, by the St Dunstan's Society of Change Ringers.

== Clergy ==
The Rev. Canon Thomas Benjamin Watkins was vicar of St Dunstan's between 1888 and 1894.
