= Swalcliffe Park School =

Special school in Swalcliffe, Oxfordshire, England

Location
- Swalcliffe; Banbury, Oxfordshire, OX15 5EP; England; 52.0373°N 1.4514°W

Information
- Type: Non-maintained special school Boarding school
- Established: 1965
- Department for Education URN: 123331 Tables
- Ofsted: Reports
- Principal: Rob Piner
- Gender: Boys
- Age: 10 to 19
- Enrolment: 73
- Website: swalcliffepark.co.uk

Swalcliffe Park School is a specialist residential and day school in Oxfordshire, England, for autistic boys aged 10-19.

In day and residential settings, the school emphasises the development of students' communication, independence, self-management and personalised achievement. It has received three consecutive 'Outstanding' Ofsted ratings, in 2008, 2012 and 2015. Following an inspection on 19 and 20 November 2024, Ofsted concluded that the school had taken effective action to maintain the standards identified at its previous inspection. Many pupils have additional needs associated with other diagnoses; e.g. ADHD, Dyslexia, Dyspraxia or Specific Language Impairment.

Swalcliffe Park School is run by the Swalcliffe Park School Trust, a registered charity. It is housed in Swalcliffe Park, a Grade II listed former country house dating principally from the 18th and 19th centuries and incorporating part of an earlier 17th-century house.
