= Swalcliffe =

Village in Oxfordshire, England

Coordinates: 52.038°N 1.452°W

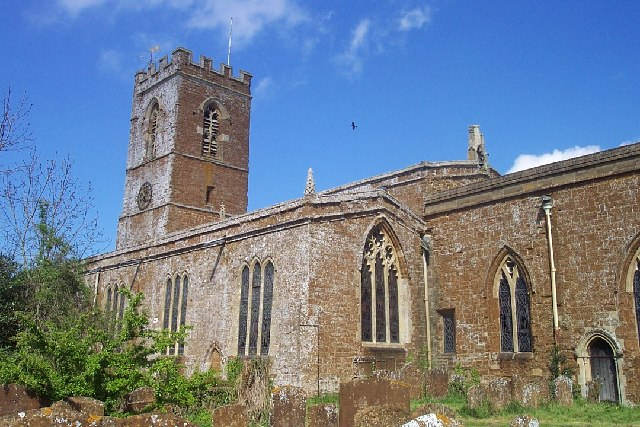
- St Peter and St Paul parish church

- Location within Oxfordshire
- Area: 6.79 km^{2} (2.62 sq mi)
- Population: 254 (2011 Census)
  - Density: 37/km^{2} (96/sq mi)
- OS grid reference: SP3737
- Civil parish: Swalcliffe
- District: Cherwell District
- Shire county: Oxfordshire
- Region: South East
- Country: England
- Sovereign state: United Kingdom
- Post town: Banbury
- Postcode district: OX15
- Dialling code: 01295
- Police: Thames Valley
- Fire: Oxfordshire
- Ambulance: South Central
- UK Parliament: Banbury
- Website: Swalcliffe Village

Swalcliffe is a village and civil parish about 5 miles (8 km) west of Banbury in Oxfordshire. The parish is about 2 1/2 miles (4 km) long north–south and about 1 mile (1.6 km) east–west. The 2011 Census recorded the population of the modern Swalcliffe parish as 210. The toponym "Swalcliffe" comes from the Old English swealwe and clif, meaning a slope or cliff frequented by swallows. The ancient parish of Swalcliffe was larger than the present civil parish, and included the townships of East Shutford, Epwell, Sibford Ferris, Sibford Gower and West Shutford.

== Archaeology ==
About 3/4 mile (1.2 km) northeast of the village are the remains of an Iron Age hill fort on Madmarston Hill and the site of a Roman villa at Swalcliffe Lea. The hill fort is a scheduled monument. The site of the villa is close to the course of a former Roman road running approximately east–west. Its course is now a bridleway. One authority asserts that there was a Roman or Romano-British village here.

== Manor ==
Swalcliffe Manor house has a 13th-century service wing and a 14th-century hall. In the 16th century the hall was divided up and a solar was added. The house has later additions including a 20th-century extension. It is a Grade I listed building.

== Parish church ==
The Church of England parish church of St Peter and St Paul is Anglo-Saxon in origin but was rebuilt in the 12th and 14th centuries. The bell tower was built in the 13th century and made higher in the 15th century. The church is a Grade I listed building. The tower has a ring of six bells cast by Matthew I Bagley and Henry II Bagley of Chacombe, Northamptonshire in 1685. Richard Sanders of Bromsgrove recast one of them in 1720. St Peter and Paul's parish is a member of the Benefice of Wykeham, along with the parishes of Broughton, Epwell, Shutford, Sibford Gower and Tadmarton.

== Tithe barn ==
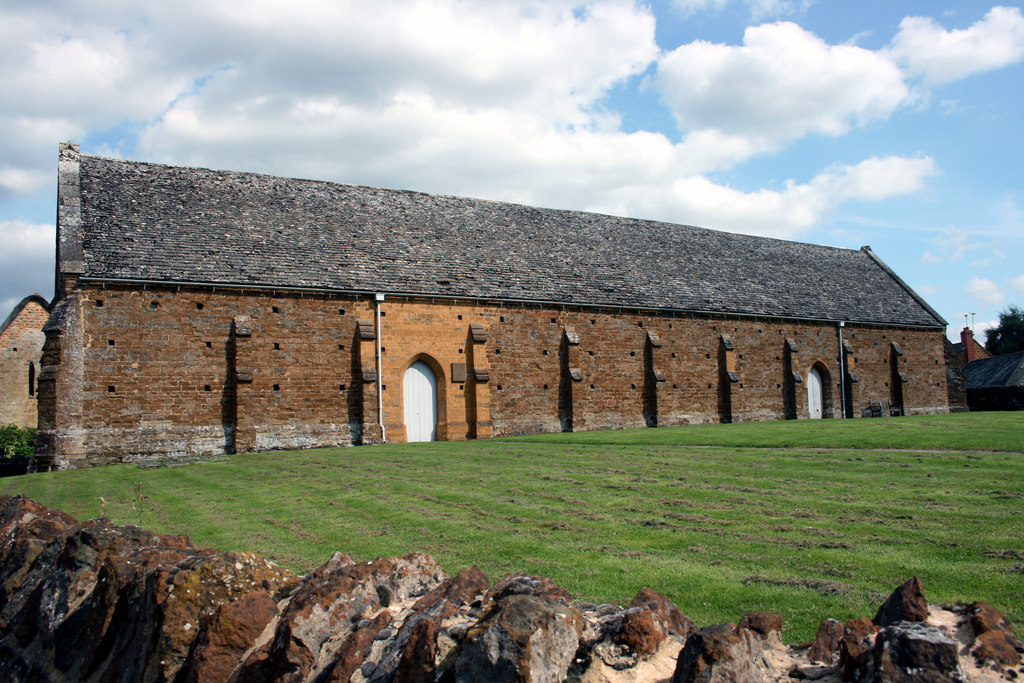
Swalcliffe Tithe Barn

Swalcliffe tithe barn was built for New College, Oxford in 1401–07. It has an almost completely intact medieval timber half-cruck roof and is considered the finest medieval tithe barn in Oxfordshire and one of the best examples in England. It is a Grade I listed building and a scheduled monument. The barn is open free of charge on Sundays from Easter to October and houses part of the Oxfordshire Museum's collection of traditional agricultural and trade vehicles and an exhibition of 2,500 years of Swalcliffe history. The building has similarities to the tithe barns at Adderbury and Upper Heyford, which also were built for New College around the beginning of the 15th century.

== Amenities ==
Swalcliffe has a 17th-century public house, The Stag's Head. There is also a village hall.

Swalcliffe Park School is a boarding school for boys with special educational needs. It is housed in Swalcliffe Park, a Grade II listed former stately home originally built in the 16th century and remodelled in the 18th century. It is a specialist residential and day school for boys aged 11–19 who have needs arising from their Autistic Spectrum conditions. In day and residential settings, the school emphasises the development of students' communication, independence, self-management and personalised achievement. Many pupils have additional needs associated with other diagnoses; e.g. ADHD, Dyslexia, Dyspraxia or Specific Language Impairment. It is run by the Swalcliffe Park School Trust, a registered charity.

Formerly Stagecoach in Warwickshire bus 50A to Banbury and Stratford-Upon-Avon served Swalcliffe several times a day.

== Helicopter crash ==
On the 8 April 1986 an McAlpine Helicopters Ltd, Aérospatiale AS 355F1 Twin Squirrel (G-BKIH) was flying over Swalcliffe from Pangbourne to Alton Towers when the aircraft engine failed. The helicopter crashed & caught fire, killing all Six passengers and crew.

== Sources and further reading ==
- Aston, Michael; Bond, James (1976). The Landscape of Towns. Archaeology in the Field Series. London: J.M. Dent & Sons Ltd. p. 45. ISBN 0-460-04194-0.
- Colvin, Christina; Cooper, Janet; Cooper, NH; Harvey, PDA; Hollings, Marjory; Hook, Judith; Jessup, Mary; Lobel, Mary D; Mason, JFA; Trinder, BS; Turner, Hilary (1972). Crossley, Alan (ed.). A History of the County of Oxford. Victoria County History. Vol. 10: Banbury Hundred. London: Oxford University Press for the Institute of Historical Research. pp. 225–260. ISBN 978-0-19722-728-2.
- Fowler, Peter J (1960). "Excavations at Madmarston Camp, Swalcliffe, 1957–8" (PDF). Oxoniensia. XXV. Oxford Architectural and Historical Society: 3–48. ISSN 0308-5562.
- Lobel, Mary D, ed. (1959). A History of the County of Oxford. Victoria County History. Vol. 6: Ploughley Hundred. London: Oxford University Press for the Institute of Historical Research. pp. 196–205.
- Mills, AD; Room, Adrian (2003). A Dictionary of British Place-Names. Oxford: Oxford University Press. ISBN 0-19-852758-6.
- Munby, Julian; Steane, JM (1995). "Swalcliffe: A New College Barn in the Fifteenth Century" (PDF). Oxoniensia. LX. Oxfordshire Architectural and Historical Society: 333–378. ISSN 0308-5562.
- Sherwood, Jennifer; Pevsner, Nikolaus (1974). Oxfordshire. The Buildings of England. Harmondsworth: Penguin Books. pp. 860–862. ISBN 0-14-071045-0.
