= Teresa Morgan =

British academic

- Occupations: Academic; cleric

Academic background
- Education: University of Cambridge (M.A., Ph.D.); University of Oxford (M.A., D.Litt.)

Academic work
- Institutions: Yale University
- Notable works: Literate Education in the Hellenistic and Roman Worlds; Roman Faith and Christian Faith

Teresa Morgan is an English academic and cleric, best known as the author of Literate Education in the Hellenistic and Roman Worlds and Roman Faith and Christian Faith.

== Early life and education ==
Teresa Morgan attended Oxford High School before studying the violin at the Hochschule für Musik, Cologne. She studied as an undergraduate and graduate student at Clare College, Cambridge, and as a postgraduate student at the Royal Academy of Music. She was a research fellow of St John's College, Cambridge and Newnham College, Cambridge, fellow of University College, Oxford, and Nancy Bissell Turpin Fellow and Tutor in Ancient History at Oriel College, Oxford. Since 2022 she has been McDonald Agape Professor of New Testament and Early Christianity at Yale University . She holds a master's degree (M.A.) and doctorate (Ph.D.) from Cambridge, Dip. R.A.M., L.R.A.M., and a master's degree (M.A.) and doctorate (D.Litt.) from Oxford.

== Academic career ==
Morgan is best known as the author of Literate Education in the Hellenistic and Roman Worlds and Roman Faith and Christian Faith. Her research interests lie in the study of ancient education, ethics, early Christianity and contemporary historiography. Her books address the relationship between literature and society in antiquity, cultural and intellectual history and early Christian history and theology. She broadcasts regularly on radio and television and writes for The Tablet, the Church Times and The Times Literary Supplement. She is an elected international honorary member of the American Academy of Arts and Sciences.

Morgan is Professor of Graeco-Roman History in the Faculty of Classics, University of Oxford, and Nancy Bissell Turpin Fellow and Tutor in Ancient History at Oriel College, Oxford. She has served as University Assessor, as an elected member of the governing council of Oxford University, as Associate Head of the Humanities Division of the university, chair of the Faculty of Classics, Chair of several university committees and working groups, and as a trustee of the Oxford Centre for Islamic Studies. Morgan is joining Yale Divinity School faculty beginning in 2022 as a McDonald-Agape Professor-elect of New Testament and Early Christianity.

=== Roman Faith and Christian Faith ===
Roman Faith and Christian Faith (2015) is a much-discussed study of how early Christians understood and practised 'faith' (pistis, fides in the languages which dominate early sources). Locating Christian understandings of pistis/fides in their contexts in Hellenistic Judaism and Graeco-Roman society, the book argues that for early Christians, trust and faithfulness, rather than belief in doctrines or non-rational fideism, were salvific and central to life in a Christian community. Belief and orthodoxy become central to later Christianity through contact with Greek philosophy and religion. In 2017 Morgan received a Leverhulme Major Research Fellowship to write a sequel to Roman Faith and Christian Faith, investigating the evolution of Christian faith between the second and fifth centuries CE.

=== Literate Education in the Hellenistic and Roman Worlds ===
Morgan's most cited book, Literate Education in the Hellenistic and Roman Worlds (1998), examines Hellenistic and Roman education and reinterprets the function of literature, grammar and rhetoric in education, as well as looking at Hellenistic and Roman theories of cognitive development. The book is on the reading lists of many university courses and modules in the UK and the United States.

== Ordained ministry ==
Morgan was ordained in the Church of England as a deacon in 2002 and as a priest in 2003. Since 2002, she has been a non-stipendiary minister of the Church of St Mary and St Nicholas, Littlemore, and the Church of St Andrew, Sandford-on-Thames, in the Diocese of Oxford.

== Selected works ==
- Literate Education in the Hellenistic and Roman Worlds Cambridge University Press, 1998. ISBN 0-521-58466-3
- Popular morality in the early Roman Empire Cambridge University Press, 2007. ISBN 0-521-87553-6
- Seasons of the Spirit: A Community's Journey Through the Christian Year The Bible Reading Fellowship, 2010. ISBN 1-84101-710-8
- Every-Person Ministry SPCK, 2011. ISBN 978-0-281-06447-2
- Roman Faith and Christian Faith Oxford University Press, 2015. ISBN 978-0-19-880105-4
- Being "In Christ" in the Letters of Paul: Saved Through Christ and In His Hands Mohr Siebeck Press, Tübingen, 2020. ISBN 978-3-16-159885-2
- The New Testament and The Theology of Trust: "This Rich Trust" Oxford University Press, 2022. ISBN 978-0-19-285958-7
