= William Edmunds (architect) =

British architect

William Edmunds was a British architect who designed Margate Lighthouse, Holy Trinity Church, Margate and Holy Trinity Church, Dover. He was also father of the convicted murderer Christiana Edmunds.

== Parents ==
William was born in Margate around 1801. His parents were Thomas and Ann Edmunds. His father had been a carpenter, surveyor and by 1811 was the proprietor of the White Hart Hotel in Marine Parade, Margate.

== Early life ==
=== Witness in libel action against sister ===
In 1815 a libel action was taken against Williams' elder sister Mary by a Margate solicitor John Boys. Anonymous libels had been placarded around Margate and some sent directly to John Boys. The first, from June 1814 repeated a rumour that John Boys had borrowed an iron roller from a coach master called Mummery and sold it. The second libel concerned a disagreement over the organ in St Johns Church, Margate, the third concerned a lime kiln at Margate and suggested Boys was in league with the Devil.

The case centered around whether the libels were written in the handwriting of Mary. When asked as a witness if the libels were written in Mary's hand William said "I do not believe it is."

The jury found in favour of Boys and awarded him £10 damages rather than the £1000 he sought. There was considerable support among friends

=== Street map ===
In 1821 he produced the first detailed street map of Margate.

=== Father's death ===
Thomas Edmunds died around 1824 and William and Mary ran the hotel, though by 1826 it was recorded that George Creed was the proprietor.

== Work ==
=== Holy Trinity Church, Margate ===
The growth in the population of Margate meant that St. John's Church was no longer adequate for the town. The Church building act 1818 provided partial funding for church building. 24 designs were considered and William's was chosen. The foundation stone was laid on 28 September 1825. A procession from the garden of Hawley Square to the site of the new church was held beforehand, including the Archbishop of Canterbury, Sir Edward Knatchbull, MP for Kent, the Vicar, the Rev. W.F. Baylay, William Edmunds and local dignitaries.

The church required more funds than initially thought and was finally consecrated on 11 June 1829.

=== Other public buildings ===
William was the original architech for Margate Lighthouse, Droit House and the Boulevard, otherwise known as Levy's Bazaar.

== Marriage ==
In 1828 he married Ann Christiana Burn, sister of John Southerden Burn. Their first child Christiana was probably born on 29 August 1829, a daughter Mary was born in 1832, Louisa was born in 1833 and a son Arthur Burns was born on 18 October 1841. Arthur was subject to epileptic fits as a child and because of violent behaviour he was sent to Earlswood Asylum in 1860 where he died in 1866.

== Questions over financial mismanagement ==
In 1836 and 1837 allegations had been made at public meetings against F.W. Cobb (Treasurer of the Pier and Harbour Company) and William Edmunds. The allegations against Edmunds concerned an invoice for stone totalling £305. John Sterland, a proprietor of the company, alleged that the invoice, made out by Edmunds in the name of Johnathan Duncan, but without the knowledge or authority. Also, the Treasurer entered the into the cash book as paid, but with no receipt for payment. The invoice was deposited in the safe at the Droit office, from where it was removed by an unknown person. The receipt appeared in the papers of the late Deputy Chairman of the Company, who had died as a result of suicide.

In January 1837 a special meeting of the Margate Pier and Harbour Company considered the charges against F.W. Cobb and Edmunds. It was suggested that Edmunds had drawn up the invoice at the direction of the then Chairman of the Company the late Dr. Jarvis and although the stone was delayed it arrived was paid for. It was argued that this was a sign of poor financial management and possibly something more serious.

== Later years and death ==
According to his wife's testimony at the trial of Christiana for murder "In 1843 my husband became insane, and was sent to a private lunatic asylum at Southall, where he was confined till August, 1844." He returned home in August 1844 because of expense. He had improved and remained at home until March 1845, when he was sent to the Peckham Lunatic Asylum.

His health was brought up at trial because of a defence that there was a history of insanity in the family.

He died on 15 March 1847.
