= Droit House =

Building in Margate, Kent, England

Coordinates: 51.39121°N 1.38130°E

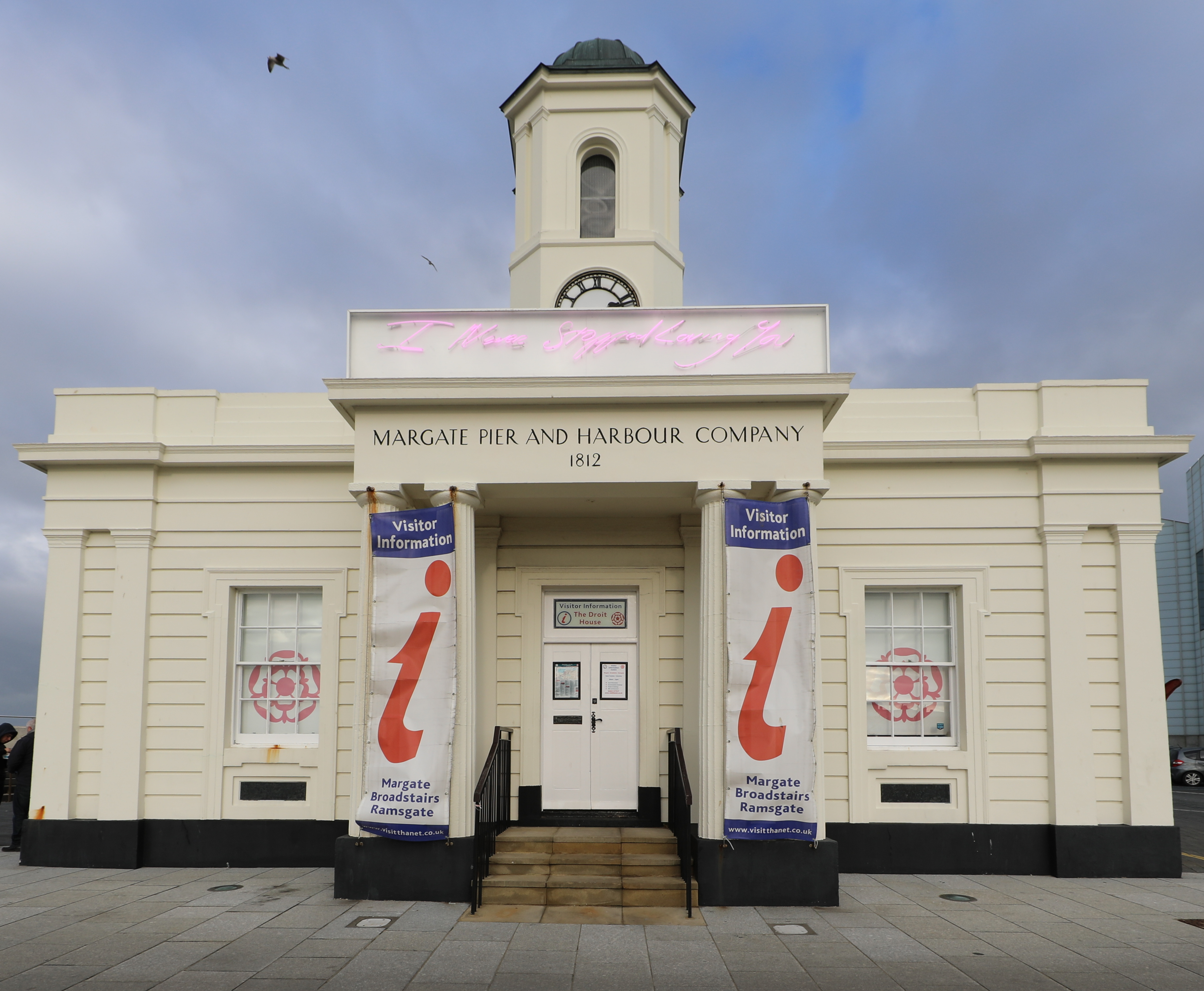
Droit House

The Droit House is a Grade II listed building and former customs house in Margate that was redesigned by William Edmunds. It was originally built in 1812 and rebuilt in 1828–30. It was destroyed during the Second World War but was rebuilt in 1947.
