= Sibford School =

Coordinates: 52.031218°N 1.479795°W

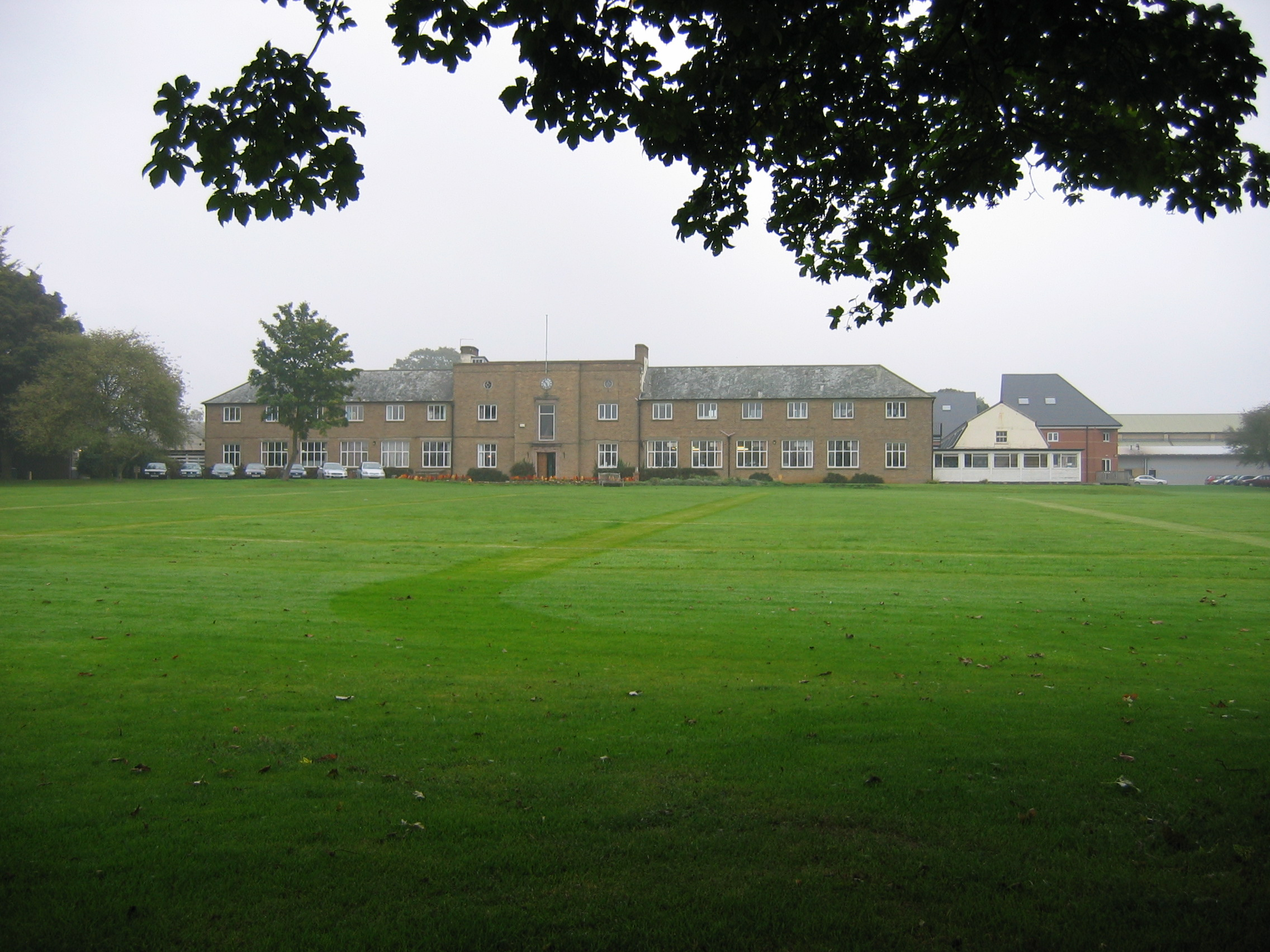
- Sibford Ferris; Banbury, Oxfordshire, OX15 5QL; England

Information
- Type: Private; Boarding school
- Religious affiliations: Religious Society of Friends (Quaker)
- Established: 1842; 184 years ago
- Department for Education URN: 123278 Tables
- Head: Rebecca Evans
- Gender: Coeducational
- Age: 3 to 18
- Enrolment: 439
- Colour: Green
- Publication: The Sibfordian
- Former pupils: Sibford Old Scholars
- Website: sibford.org.uk

Sibford School is a British co-educational independent school in Sibford Ferris, west of Banbury in north Oxfordshire, linked with the Religious Society of Friends. The school has both day and boarding pupils between the ages of 3 and 18. It is one of seven Quaker schools in England.

== History and overview ==
Sibford School was founded in 1842 as a co-educational boarding school for the children of 'disowned' Quakers - those who had married outside the Society of Friends - as their children were barred from entering Ackworth School. It later accepted children from practising Quaker families. The school was originally based in Walford Manor in the centre of Sibford Ferris, which had been remodeled in the 17th century. The Sibfords had a long association with the Quaker movement, although locally Quakers were still a dissenting minority in an area dominated by Church of England landowners. It opened with 26 boys and 22 girls and the first recorded pupil was nine-year-old Lucy Endall, who entered the school on 16 January 1842. Richard Routh was the first headmaster and remained in post until 1880. Sibford School initially occupied 18 acres of land and had a strong agricultural bias. The boys worked part-time on the farm while the girls did household duties. In this way it was possible to reduce fees to parents, which were adjusted according to means.

The school expanded to a site to the south of the village with the opening of The Hill building by Elizabeth Cadbury in 1930. It was on this site that all future building projects took place, including several boarding houses, the science block, the dining hall, sports hall, an art and music building, swimming pool and climbing wall. The Junior School, originally called Orchard Close, for primary school aged pupils, opened in 1989.

=== The School today ===
Today the school accommodates both boarders and day pupils, of all faiths and none, and in September 2023 had more than 430 pupils. It is set in more than 50 acres (200,000 m^{2}) of grounds surrounded by the Cotswold countryside. The school comprises three divisions of pupils: the Junior School for those aged 3–11; the Senior School for those aged 11–16; and the Sixth Form for those aged 16–18.

=== Independent Schools Inspectorate ===
The school was assessed by the ISI in December 2021, and awarded the top 'Excellent' rating in both the quality of education offered and personal development for students. The marking is the highest possible, and is equivalent to the award of an 'Outstanding' assessment in the state sector by OFSTED.

== Notable former pupils ==
Old scholars form the Sibford Old Scholars Association (SOSA).

- Charley Boorman
- Sir John Burgh
- Paul Eddington
- Elizabeth Jolley
- Joseph Coles Kirby
- Ollie Locke
- Guy Ritchie
- Warrulan (circa 1835–1855), an Aboriginal Australian, brought to England in 1845
- Beth Tanenhaus Winsten

== Headteachers ==
- Richard Routh (1842–1880)
- Robert Oddie (1880–1906)
- James Harrod (1906–1930)
- Arthur Johnstone (1930–1956)
- Hugh Maw (1956–1962)
- Jonas Fielding (1962–1972)
- Kenneth Greaves (1972–1980)
- Jim Graham (1980–1989)
- John Dunston (1990–1996)
- Sue Freestone (1997–2004)
- Michael Goodwin (2004–2016)
- Toby Spence (2016–2023)
- Rebecca Evans (2023–present)

== See also ==
- List of Friends Schools
