= Henry Jones Underwood =

English architect (1804–1852)

- Born: 1804; Bristol, England
- Died: 1852; Bath, England
- Occupation: Architect
- Buildings: Oxford Botanic Garden Library; St Paul's Parish Church, Oxford; St Mary and St Nicholas, Littlemore

Henry Jones Underwood (1804–1852) was an English architect who spent most of his career in Oxford. He was the brother of the architects Charles Underwood (circa 1791–1883) and George Allen Underwood (dates unknown).

Underwood trained in London as a pupil of Henry Hake Seward and then joined the office of Sir Robert Smirke. In 1830 he moved to Oxford where much of his work involved designing churches or schools. He built Saint Paul's parish church, Walton Street, and the library of the Oxford Botanic Garden in the Greek Revival style but is best known for his Gothic Revival architecture. His church at Littlemore for Newman became a model for other churches.

Underwood designed an extension to Oxford Prison. In 1852 he committed suicide at the White Hart Hotel, Bath, Somerset so J. C. Buckler completed the extension in his stead.

== Works ==
- Saint John the Baptist parish church, Summertown, Oxford, 1831 (demolished 1924)
- Exeter College, Oxford: buildings on Turl Street and Broad Street, 1833-34
- Pembroke College, Oxford: rebuilding of Wolsey's Almshouses, 1834
- Saint Mary and Saint Nicholas parish church, Littlemore, Oxfordshire, 1835
- Botanic Garden, Oxford: library, 1835
- Saint Paul's parish church, Walton Street, Oxford, 1836 (now Freud's bar)
- Saint Peter's parish church, Bushey Heath, Hertfordshire, 1836-37
- Parish church of the Ascension, Littleworth, Vale of White Horse, 1839
- All Saints' parish church, Llangorwen, 1839
- Holy Trinity parish church, Lower Beeding, West Sussex, 1840
- Holy Trinity, Burdrop (Sibford Gower), Oxfordshire, 1840
- Saint Giles' parish church, Horspath, Oxfordshire: rebuilt chancel, 1840
- Saint Mary's parish, Broughton, Oxfordshire: extension of Rectory, 1842
- Saint John the Baptist parish church, Bodicote, Oxfordshire: rebuilt church, 1844
- Saint Mary's parish church, Swerford, Oxfordshire: north aisle, 1846
- Saint Leonard's parish church, Woodcote, Oxfordshire: rebuilt church, 1846
- Littlemore Hospital, Littlemore, Oxfordshire: extension, 1847
- Saint Sepulchre's Cemetery, Oxford: chapel, 1848 (demolished circa 1970)
- Oxford Prison extension, 1848-56
- Christ Church Unitarian chapel, Banbury, 1850 (demolished circa 1972)
- Saint Giles' parish church, Horspath: north aisle and north transept, 1852
- Saint Michael and All Angels parish church, Bootle, north and south transept, 1837

His work also includes Holy Trinity Church, Oxford and the north aisle of Saint Thomas's parish church, Oxford. (date uncertain).
