= Church of St Mary and St Nicholas, Littlemore =

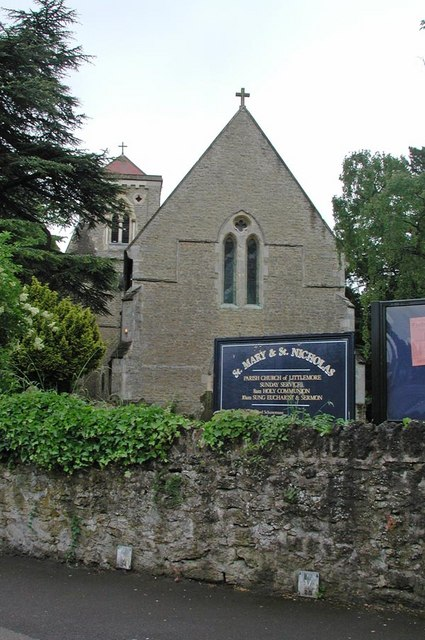
- Church of St Mary and St Nicholas, Littlemore
- 51.721086°N 1.223221°W
- OS grid reference: SP 53755 02770
- Location: Cowley Road, Littlemore, Oxford, Oxfordshire, OX4 4PB
- Country: England
- Denomination: Church of England

History
- Status: Active
- Dedication: Saint Mary the Virgin and Saint Nicholas
- Consecrated: 22 September 1836

Architecture
- Functional status: Parish church
- Heritage designation: Grade II* listed
- Designated: 18 July 1963
- Architect(s): H. J. Underwood; Joseph Clarke

Administration
- Diocese: Diocese of Oxford
- Archdeaconry: Archdeaconry of Oxford
- Deanery: Cowley
- Parish: Littlemore

The Church of St Mary and St Nicholas is a Church of England parish church in Littlemore, Oxford, Oxfordshire. The church is a grade II* listed building. The church was founded by John Henry Newman, later Cardinal Newman of the Roman Catholic Church, and it became a centre of Anglo-Catholicism.

== History ==
The church was built from 1835 to 1836 by H. J. Underwood for John Henry Newman (later Cardinal Newman of the Roman Catholic Church). The foundation stone was laid in 1835 by Jemima, mother of Newman, and the church was consecrated on 22 September 1836. In 1848, the chancel and tower were added by Joseph Clarke.

The church had originally been built as a chapel of ease in the parish of the University Church of St Mary the Virgin, Oxford. In 1847, Littlemore became its own parish and the chapel was renamed the Church of St Mary and St Nicholas.

A new east window was added to the church in approximately 1900. The stained glass had been designed by Louis Davis and was in memory of Vernon Green, a former vicar. The American poet Louise Imogen Guiney gave a crucifix sculpture to the church to mark the centenary of Cardinal Newman's birth in 1901.

On 18 July 1963, the church was designated a grade II* listed building.

=== Present day ===
The parish of Littlemore is in the Archdeaconry of Oxford of the Diocese of Oxford.

== Notable clergy ==
- John Rouse Bloxam, curate from 1837 to 1840
- Sarah Coakley, honorary curate from 2000 to 2007
- William John Copeland, curate from 1840 to 184?
- Helen-Ann Hartley, later Bishop of Waikato, and then Bishop of Ripon, curate from 2007 to 2012
- Teresa Morgan, professor at Oxford University, non-stipendiary minister (NSM) from 2002 to present
- John Muddiman, NSM from 1997 to 2012
- Isaac Williams, curate in 1836

=== List of vicars ===
The incumbent of the parish is the vicar. The following have been vicar, or otherwise stated, of the parish:

- 1836–1845: John Henry Newman
- 1847–1848: C. L. Cornish
- 1848–1851: C. Walters
- 1851–1870: George W. Huntingford; perpetual curate (1851–1864)
- 1872–1896: Vernon T. Green
- 1897–1908: H. Irvine
- 1908–1930: George Champion
- 1931–1951: Buckwell
- 1951–1964: Martin Young
- 1964–1971: Valentine Fletcher
- 1972–1978: Raymond Crouch; priest-in-charge
- 1978–1996: David Nicholls; priest-in-charge (1978–1986)
- 1997–2006: Bernhard Schünemann; priest-in-charge
- 2006–present: Margreet Armitstead; priest-in-charge

== Gallery ==
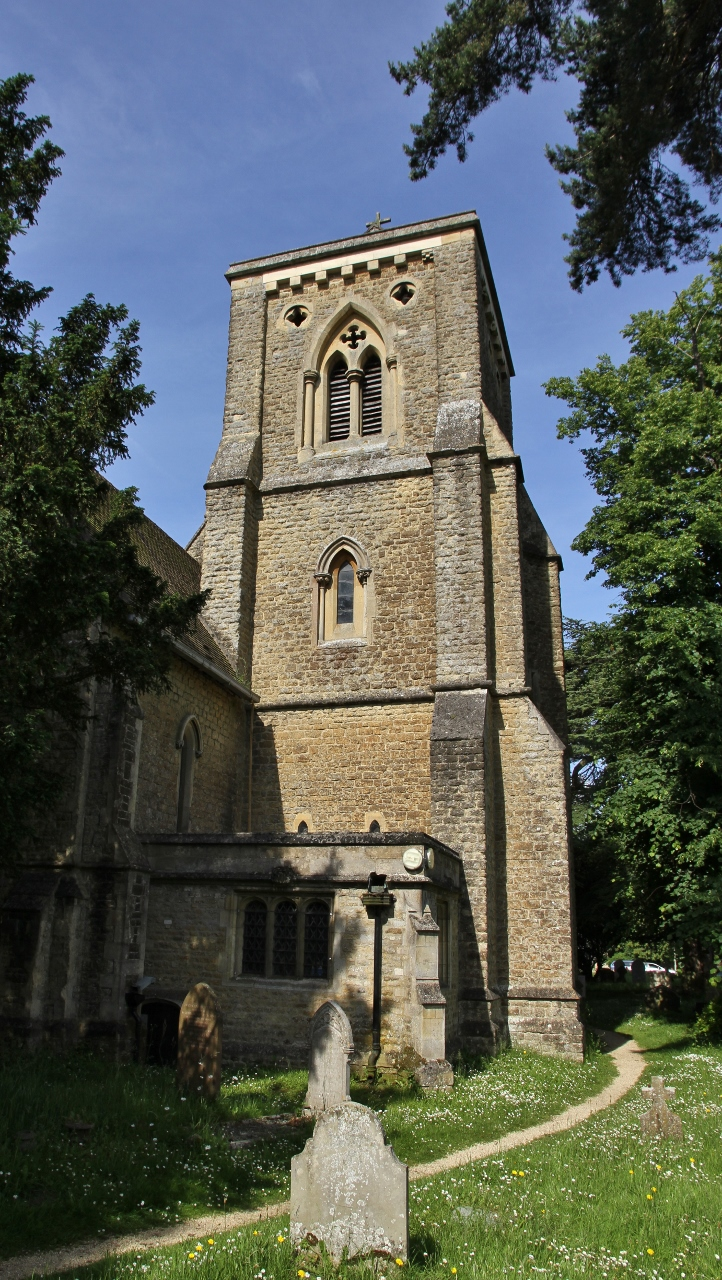
Tower

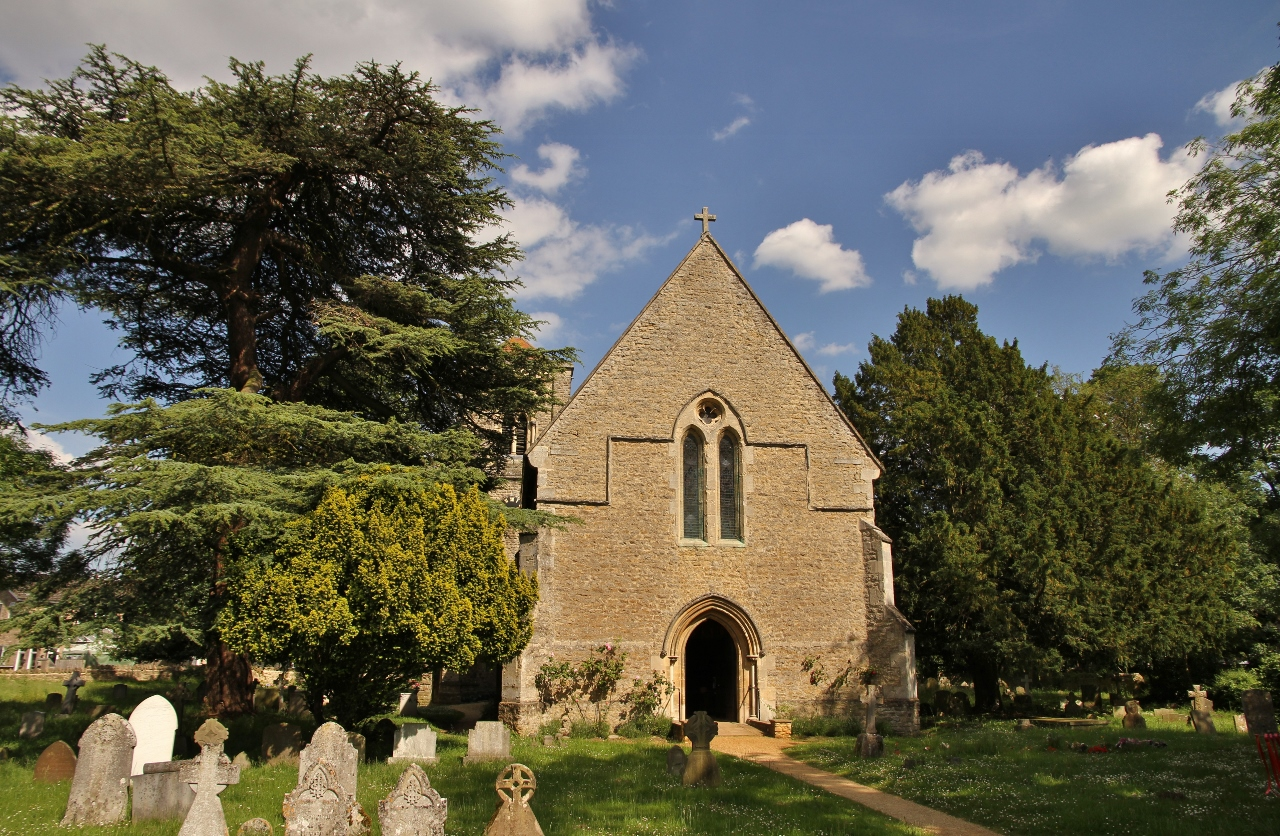
Church from the west

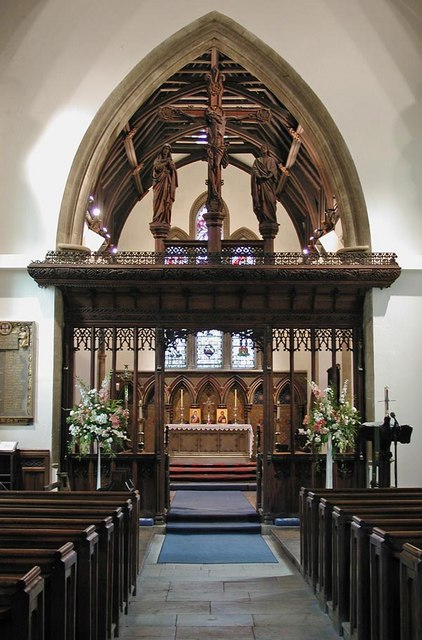
Rood screen

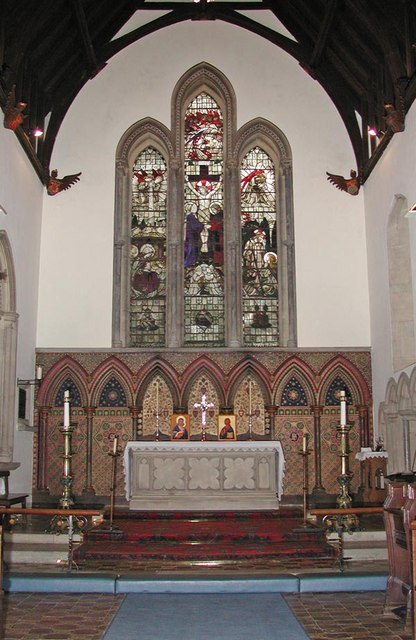
Chancel with high altar and reredos

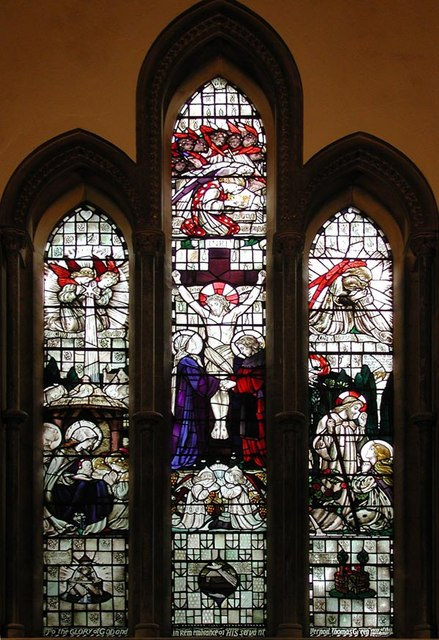
East window

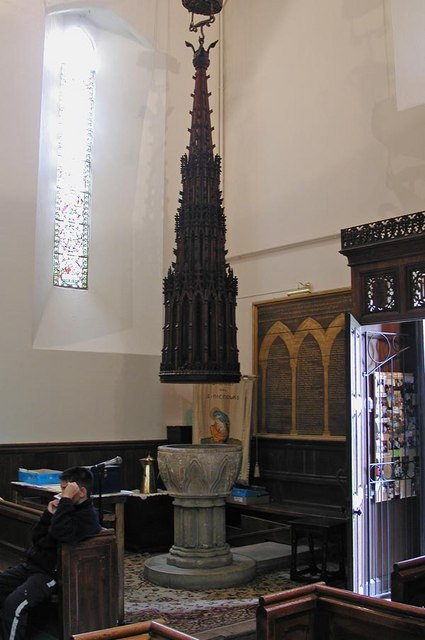
Font
