= Shutford =

Village in Oxfordshire, England

Coordinates: 52.060°N 1.438°W

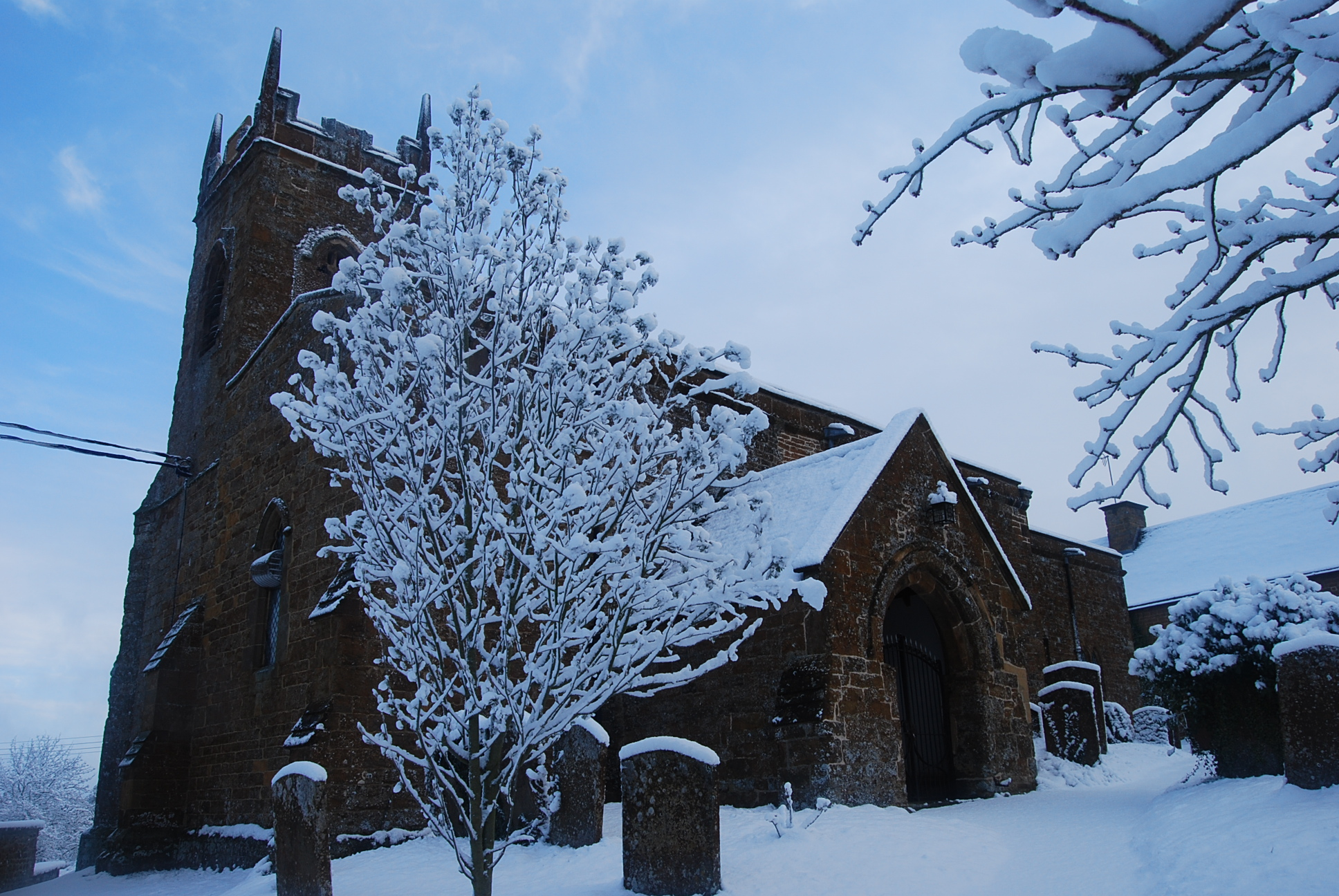
- St Martin's parish church

- Location within Oxfordshire
- Area: 5.51 km^{2} (2.13 sq mi)
- Population: 476 (2011 census)
  - Density: 86/km^{2} (220/sq mi)
- OS grid reference: SP3840
- Civil parish: Shutford
- District: Cherwell
- Shire county: Oxfordshire
- Region: South East
- Country: England
- Sovereign state: United Kingdom
- Post town: Banbury
- Postcode district: OX15
- Dialling code: 01295
- Police: Thames Valley
- Fire: Oxfordshire
- Ambulance: South Central
- UK Parliament: Banbury

Shutford is a village and civil parish in the Cherwell district, in Oxfordshire, England, about 7.2 kilometres (4.5 mi) west of Banbury. The village is about 145 metres (476 ft) above sea level. In 2011 the parish had a population of 476. In 1870–72, John Marius Wilson's Imperial Gazetteer of England and Wales described Shutford like this:

"SHUTFORD, a chapelry in Swalcliffe parish, Oxford; 5 miles W of Banbury r. station. It has a postal pillar-box under Banbury. Acres, 640. Real property, £2,840. Pop., 386. Houses, 98. The living is annexed to Swalcliffe. The church was repaired in 1841. There are chapels for Wesleyans and Primitive Methodists."

The name Shutford is derived from Scytta's Ford. In the fourteenth century the village was quite large. 20 people were assessed for tax in 1327. In 1377 there were 86. A fire in 1701 destroyed 24 houses. Some houses were rebuilt and modernised. In 1774 71 houses were recorded. In the Middle Ages there were 3 manors in Shutford. The manor house appears to have been built in the 16th century. In the Civil War, Viscount Saye and Sele supported the Parliamentarians. Plush and shag weaving was established in 1747 and became the village's main claim to fame.

== Church and chapel ==
The Church of England Parish Church of Saint Martin dates from the 12th century, when it was built in the transitional style between Norman and Early English Gothic. The north aisle, two bays of the arcade between this aisle and the nave, and the lower stage of the bell tower survive from this period. In the 13th century the north aisle was extended eastwards with an Early English Gothic third bay. In the 13th or 14th century the nave was rebuilt in the Decorated Gothic style. The south windows, porch and doorway, chancel arch and east window all date from this period. The Perpendicular Gothic windows of the north aisle and the upper stage of the bell tower were added later. The church building was restored in 1841. Since 1955 it has been a Grade II* listed building. Shutford had a Methodist chapel. It is now a private house.

== History ==
=== Early settlement ===
Iron Age barrows in the neighbouring villages of Sibford Gower and Swalcliffe, as well as the remains of an extensive Romano-British settlement, suggest that the area was inhabited from an early time. Shutford was not mentioned in the Domesday Book but was recorded as a settlement in the twelfth century under the name schiteford. Nearby Madmarston Hill, a late Iron Age hill camp, is the earliest known settlement in the (Banbury) hundred. It was probably occupied from the 2nd century B.C. until the 1st century A.D. when it appears to have been deserted, except for a brief period in the 4th century. The site was extensively excavated in 1957–58.

Shutford also lies close to what is now known as Swalcliffe Lea and was one of the largest Roman occupation sites in the county, covering 50 acres. The site was occupied throughout the Roman period and possibly earlier. The settlement which was quite large in the 1st century A.D. seems to have declined in the second but flourished again in the late third and fourth centuries. From the 14th to the 17th centuries a medieval hamlet called the Lea stood on the site all traces of which have now disappeared. The site was excavated by the Oxford University Archaeological Society in 1958. A villa in the field to the south east of the township site and immediately to the east of Lower Lea farmhouse was excavated in 2000.

=== The Manor House ===
The manor house was built in the last quarter of the 16th century and is the main house of the former East Shutford parish. Built by Sir Richard Fiennes, the MP for Banbury, between 1580 and 1600. A distinguishing feature is the tall staircase tower. Although the Fiennes family never lived at the Manor it is said that just before the outbreak of the Civil War the Parliamentarian William Fiennes, Lord Saye and Sele drilled soldiers in the upper storey of the house (then one large room). In 1928 the architect Walter Tapper added a western extension and northwest wing. The manor house was once owned by the Saye and Sele family, whose seat is now 3 miles (4.8 km) from Shutford at Broughton Castle.

=== Plush industry ===
From about 1750 Shutford was part of the Banbury area's plush industry. Banbury was the centre for dyeing, marketing and distributing, but yarn was sent out to surrounding villages where it was woven. In 1841 two thirds of all plush weavers in the country lived in the Banbury area and, of these, about a quarter were in Shutford. By 1850 the industry in the rest of the Banbury area was declining under competition from power loom weavers in Coventry. However, Shutford remained in the plush trade by concentrating on the skilled manufacture of high quality plush for liveries, upholstery and furnishings.

By 1910 the only handwoven livery plush manufacturer in the world, Wrench's, based in Shutford supplied plush for the coronation of Tsar Nicholas II of Russia in 1896, produced decorations at Windsor Castle for Queen Victoria and specially made liveries for royal courts all over Europe and for the embassies of China, Japan, Persia and the United States. Despite a disastrous fire at the factory in 1913, the industry was revived and enjoyed a degree of prosperity between the wars. After the Second World War, however, with supply, demand and labour problems, the owners decided to reluctantly sell up in 1948. From the collapse of the plush industry to the 1960s Shutford declined, losing its school, its public house, and for a time having no Vicar. Property and street names such as Weavers Row, Weavers Cottage and The Weavers Shop give an indication of the village's illustrious past.

== Amenities ==
View above Shutford, 15 August 2004

Since this short period of economic decline, all of the derelict buildings have been rebuilt and restored and many new houses added to the village, predominantly built with traditional Hornton stone. One focus of the village is the George and Dragon free house pub and restaurant. Many successful small businesses now operate from the village. It has a cricket club and thriving community association which organises sports days, carol singing, fetes and concerts in St Martin's Church. Shutford also has a Women's Institute. The small post office in Ivy Lane closed in 2005, and Shutford is now served by nearby . Sibford Gower post office.

== Sources ==
- Emery, Frank (1974). The Oxfordshire Landscape. The Making of the English Landscape. London: Hodder & Stoughton. pp. 177–178. ISBN 0-340-04301-6.
- Sherwood, Jennifer; Pevsner, Nikolaus (1974). Oxfordshire. The Buildings of England. Harmondsworth: Penguin Books. p. 766. ISBN 0-14-071045-0.
