= Holy Trinity Church, Dover =

Former church in Dover, Kent, England

Holy Trinity Church, Dover was a church designed by William Edmunds. Building of the church began in September 1833 and it was completed in 1835. It was demolished after being damaged by German air raids and cross-channel shelling during World War II.

== See also ==
- St James' Church, Dover
- St Mary's Church, Dover
