= Beth Tanenhaus Winsten =

American filmmaker

Beth Tanenhaus Winsten is an American filmmaker, screenwriter, visual artist, and creator of the digital genre tinyBigPictureshows with channels on YouTube and Vimeo. Her work has been broadcast on the National Geographic Explorer Series, TBS, PBS, ABC affiliates among others. The National Gallery of Art in Washington, D.C. and the Detroit Institute of Arts have showcased her work.

== Biography ==
Daughter of political scientist Joseph Tanenhaus and classics scholar Gussie Hecht Tanenhaus, her siblings are Michael Tanenhaus, Sam Tanenhaus, and David S. Tanenhaus.

After attending the Sibford School in Sibford Ferris, England and becoming the first American accepted as a member of The Royal Shakespeare Company National Youth Theatre in London, England, Tanenhaus Winsten briefly attended Indiana University before graduating with a B.A. in English from Wayne State University. She received an M.A. in 1995 in film from the University of Michigan where she has taught screenwriting. As a graduate student, Tanenhaus Winsten won the 1995 Major Drama Hopwood Award for her screenplay The Black Corset Affair and a 1995 public affairs Emmy Award for her thesis film Body & Soul.

Tanenhaus Winsten’s script Rock Garden won the 1999 National Festival of New Works Competition which led to a rewrite under the supervision of Kurt Luedtke. Dan T. Green directed an Actors' Equity Association production of a staged reading of Rock Garden at the Trueblood Theater in 1999.

Before founding btwfilms in Ann Arbor, Michigan in 2009 with associate, Mike Smith, she was a film critic and writer on popular culture at The Metro Times in Detroit and contributed articles to The Detroit News and the Detroit Free Press.

Filmmaking awards: include 3 CINE Golden Eagles; 4 regional Emmy Awards; Blue Ribbon, 1st Place at American Film and Video Festival; 3 Golden ITVAS (International Television Awards of Excellence) and TELLYS. Screenwriting awards include: the Major Drama Avery Hopwood Award.

== Films ==
- Body & Soul (1995)
- The Journey of the Chandler/Pohrt Collection (1992)
- It's Magic (1991)
- KidSpace (1990)
- Encore on Woodward: Detroit’s Fox Theater (1989)
- The Perfect Metaphor for Poetry (2009)
- A Perfect Funeral (2009)
- Homage to David Lynch (2009)
- Motown's Oldest Music School (2009)
- Undertakings (2009)
- BEC (2010)
- Strawberry Jam (2010)
- "Having a Wonderful Time" (2011)
- "Future Based Agile Thinking (FBAT)" (2011)
- "SPARK Series" (2011–12)

== Screenplays ==
- The Black Corset Affair (1995)
- Rock Garden (1999)
