= Sam Tanenhaus =

American writer (born 1955)

- Born: October 31, 1955 (age 70)
- Education: Grinnell College (BA); Yale University (MA)
- Relatives: Michael Tanenhaus (brother); Beth Tanenhaus Winsten (sister)

Sam Tanenhaus (born October 31, 1955) is an American historian, biographer, and journalist. He currently is a writer for Prospect.

== Early life ==
Tanenhaus received his B.A. in English from Grinnell College in 1977 and an M.A. in English literature from Yale University in 1978. His siblings include psycholinguist Michael Tanenhaus, filmmaker Beth Tanenhaus Winsten, and legal historian David S. Tanenhaus.

== Career ==
External videos
- Part one of Booknotes interview with Tanenhaus on Whittaker Chambers, February 23, 1997, C-SPAN
- Part two of Booknotes interview, March 2, 1997, C-SPAN
- Presentation by Tanenhaus on Whittaker Chambers, March 18, 1997, C-SPAN

Tanenhaus was an assistant editor at The New York Times from 1997 to 1999, and a contributing editor at Vanity Fair from 1999 until 2004. From April 2004 to April 2013 he served as the editor of The New York Times Book Review. He has written many featured articles for that publication, including a 10-year retrospective on the politics of radical centrism. His 1997 biography of Whittaker Chambers won the Los Angeles Times Book Prize and was a finalist for both the National Book Award for Nonfiction and the Pulitzer Prize for Biography. Since 2019, Tanenhaus has been a visiting professor at St. Michael's College in the University of Toronto, where he teaches courses on American politics and media studies.

== Personal life ==
Tanenhaus formerly lived in Tarrytown, New York with his wife. Currently, he resides in Essex, Connecticut.

== Bibliography ==
- Tanenhaus, Sam (1984). Literature Unbound: A Guide for the Common Reader. New York: Ballantine Books. ISBN 0-345-33297-0.
- —— (July 1, 1988). Louis Armstrong: Musician. Black Americans of Achievement. New York: Chelsea House Publications. ISBN 0-7910-0221-7. OCLC 608888948.
- —— (1995). Old Greenwich Village: An Architectural Portrait. Gross, Steve (Photographer). New York: John Wiley & Sons. ISBN 0-471-14405-3. OCLC 315861193.
- —— (February 18, 1997). Whittaker Chambers: A Biography. Modern Library. ISBN 0394585593. OCLC 1520244898.
- —— (September 1, 2009). The Death of Conservatism. New York: Random House. ISBN 978-1-4000-6884-5. OCLC 316030305.
- —— (June 3, 2025). Buckley: The Life and the Revolution That Changed America (First hardcover ed.). New York: Random House. ISBN 978-0375502347. OCLC 1444155811.
