= Michael Tanenhaus =

American psycholinguist and academic

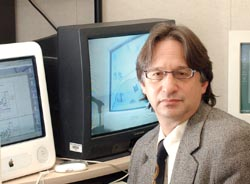
- Born: Iowa City, U.S.
- Education: University of Iowa; Columbia University
- Scientific career
- Workplaces: Antioch College; University of Rochester; Wayne State University

Michael K. Tanenhaus is an American psycholinguist, author, and lecturer. He is the Beverly Petterson Bishop and Charles W. Bishop Professor of Brain and Cognitive Sciences and Linguistics at the University of Rochester. From 1996 to 2000 and 2003–2009, he served as Director of the Center for Language Sciences at the University of Rochester.

== Biography ==
Tanenhaus grew up in New York and Iowa City. His father was a political scientist. Tanenhaus's siblings include New York Times Book Review editor Sam Tanenhaus, filmmaker Beth Tanenhaus Winsten, and legal historian David S. Tanenhaus.

Tanenhaus obtained his Bachelor of Science from the University of Iowa in speech pathology and audiology after a brief stint at Antioch College. Tanenhaus then received his Ph.D. from Columbia University in 1978. He immediately began teaching as an assistant professor, and then an associate professor at Wayne State University. Tanenhaus joined the faculty at the University of Rochester in 1983. He continues to be an involved researcher and faculty member who teaches courses on language processing and advises students. Since 2003, he has also been the director of the Center for Language Sciences. In 2018, he was awarded the David E. Rumelhart Prize by the Cognitive Science Society, the top prize in cognitive science.

== Books ==
Tanenhaus has collaborated with others to edit two books. His first book “Lexical Ambiguity Resolution: Perspective from Psycholinguistics, Neuropsychology, and Artificial Intelligence” was published in 1988. This book contains eighteen original papers which look at the concept of Lexical Ambiguity Resolution. His most recent work “Approaches to Studying World- Situated Language Use: Bridging the Language and Product and Language as Action Traditions” was published in 2004. This book was published to show the importance of looking at both social and cognitive aspects when studying language processing. The book is made up of papers and reports of relevant experimental findings.
