= John Southerden Burn =

English solicitor and antiquary

John Southerden Burn (3 July 1798 – 15 June 1870) was an English solicitor and antiquary.

== Life ==
Burn was the son of Captain John Southerden Burn of the Royal Marines and his wife Ann Ralph, daughter of Edward and Elizabeth Ralph. He was born in Chatham on 7 July 1798 and baptised at Week Street Independent Chapel, Maidstone, on 21 July. He qualified as a solicitor in 1819, when he began to practise at 11 Staple Inn, Holborn in London. In 1820 he moved to 11 King's Bench Walk, Temple, and in 1822 to 27 King Street, Cheapside. In the following year he entered into a partnership with Samuel Woodgate Durrant, which lasted till 1828, when he removed to 25 Tokenhouse Yard.

In 1831 Burn was appointed registrar of marriages at chapels prior to 1754. In 1836, he became secretary to the commission for inquiring into non-parochial registers. The Report presented by the Commissioners in 1838 states, "Our first step in the execution of the duty thus confided to us was to choose Mr. John Southerden Burn for our secretary". He retained this post until 1841. For this he was given an allowance of £700. In that year, he moved to 1 Copthall Court, Throgmorton Street, and entered into a partnership with Stacey Grimaldi and Henry Edward Stables, which lasted until 1847, when Grimaldi retired. In 1854, a new partner, Charles Tayler Ware, joined the firm. In the following year, after Stables's death, Burn retired from practice, and lived at The Grove in Henley-on-Thames. In 1857, Burn was himself appointed a member of the Commission which he had previously served as secretary, at the same time as George Graham, Registrar General from 1842 to 1880, and the barrister Horace Mann, who had compiled the Report on the Religious Census of 1851.

Burn died on 15 June 1870 at The Grove at the age of 71 and was buried on 21 June at St Mary, Henley-on-Thames by the Rector, Greville Phillimore.

== Family ==
Burn married firstly Sarah Sophia Colnett at St Lawrence Jewry on 17 April 1822. They had a daughter, Ellen, but Sarah died. He married secondly Jane Norton (1815–1899), and a marriage settlement was made on 27 September 1848. They had three children: Stacey, a doctor; John, a clergyman and Ann. He was the grandfather of John Burn Olympic rower, and cousin of Edmund Blacket, an Australian architect. He was also uncle by marriage of Christiana Edmunds.

== Works ==
Professionally concerned with parish registers, he studied them. Finding that no specialist work on the area had appeared since Observations on Parochial Registers (1764) by Ralph Bigland in 1764, he published in 1829 his Registrum Ecclesiæ Parochialis, a history of parish registers in England, with observations on those in other countries. A second edition appeared in 1862. In 1831 he published, with biographical notes, the Livre des Anglois à Genève, the register of the English church in Geneva from 1554 to 1558, which had been communicated to him by Samuel Egerton Brydges.

In 1833 he published The Fleet Registers, containing a history of Fleet marriages, which reached a third edition in 1836. In 1846 he issued his major work, The History of the French, Walloon, Dutch, and other Foreign Protestant Refugees settled in England, which he compiled mainly from registers of places of worship.

In 1861 he published A History of Henley on Thames. In 1865 he produced The High Commission, dedicated to Charles George Young, which consisted of a collection of notices of the court and its procedure drawn from various sources. Early in 1870, he issued a similar but more elaborate work on The Star Chamber, which also contained some additional notes on the court of high commission.

He also edited The Marriage and Registrations Acts (6 and 7 William IV), London, 1836.
