= St James' Church, Dover =

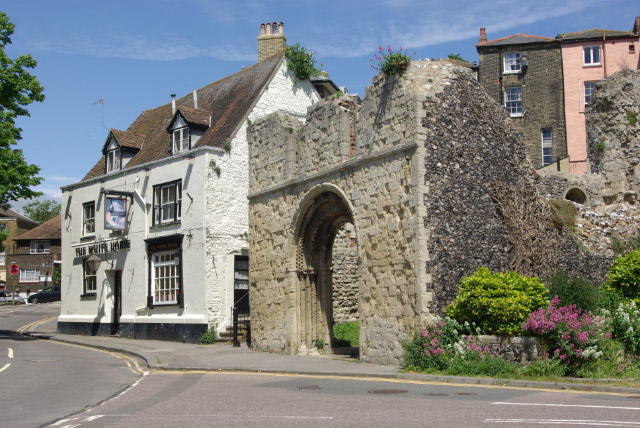
- The ruined church on St James Street
- St James' Church, Dover
- 51°07′35.07″N 1°19′01.44″E
- OS grid reference: TR 322 415
- Location: Dover
- Country: England

Architecture
- Functional status: Preserved
- Heritage designation: Grade II
- Designated: 30 June 1949
- Architectural type: Norman
- Completed: c. 1070
- Demolished: (partially) 1940s

St James' Church is a ruined church in Dover, England. It was built in the 11th century and restored in the 19th century. Badly damaged in the Second World War, it is now preserved as a Grade II listed building.

== History ==
It was originally a Norman building: the Norman arch, with typical chevron patterns, can still be seen.

The church was mentioned in the Domesday Monachorum, compiled in the time of Lanfranc who was Archbishop of Canterbury from 1070 to 1089. This book, a text related to the Domesday Book, mentions it as one of the churches in Dover.

It was a meeting place of the official courts of the Barons of the Cinque Ports; they met in an addition to the south side of the nave, built in the 14th century. The last such meeting held here took place in 1851, presided over by the Duke of Wellington who was Lord Warden of the Cinque Ports. The church was closed in 1862, however, it was restored in 1869, and an organ was installed.

== Twentieth century ==
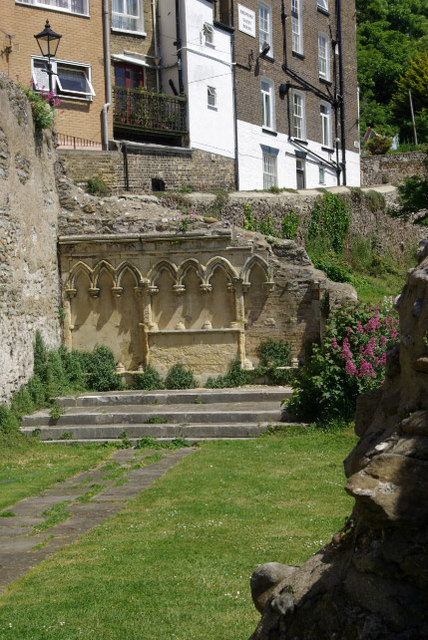
Part of the interior of the church

The church was damaged during the First World War: on 19 March 1916 a seaplane dropped bombs which fell nearby, and splinters from the blast caused damage to the roof. It was restored in 1931.

The building was severely damaged by German artillery firing across the English Channel during the Second World War. The tower of the old church, already badly damaged, collapsed in May 1950. The building was then made safe and preserved as a "tidy ruin." Dover Borough Council purchased the church and churchyard in 1970 and both have been used as an open public space since then.

== New Church ==
A new church was built from 1860–1862 to replace this church, which had become too small for the congregation. The new building was a short distance to the north, where more space was available, on Maison Dieu Road. The new church was also damaged by shelling in the Second World War, and was demolished in 1953.

== See also ==
- Holy Trinity Church, Dover
- St Mary's Church, Dover
