= Sibford Ferris =

Village in Oxfordshire, England

Coordinates: 52.034°N 01.480°W

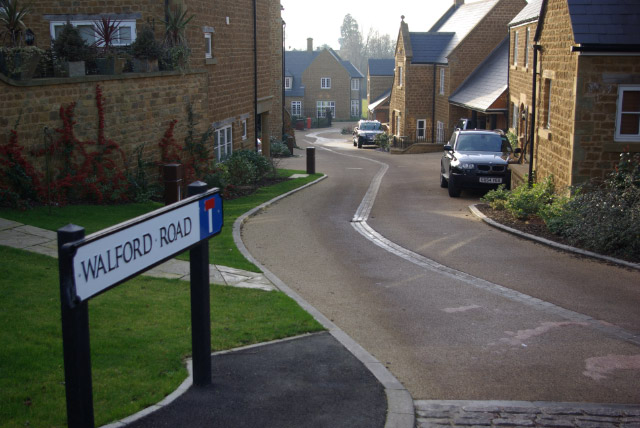
- Traditionally-styled modern houses in Sibford Ferris

- Location within Oxfordshire
- Area: 4.06 km^{2} (1.57 sq mi)
- Population: 476 (2011 Census)
  - Density: 117/km^{2} (300/sq mi)
- OS grid reference: SP3537
- Civil parish: Sibford Ferris
- District: Cherwell
- Shire county: Oxfordshire
- Region: South East
- Country: England
- Sovereign state: United Kingdom
- Post town: Banbury
- Postcode district: OX15
- Dialling code: 01295
- Police: Thames Valley
- Fire: Oxfordshire
- Ambulance: South Central
- UK Parliament: Banbury
- Website: The Sibfords

Sibford Ferris is a village and civil parish about 6.5 miles (10.5 km) west of Banbury in Oxfordshire. It is on the south side of the Sib valley opposite its larger sister village, Sibford Gower. The 2011 Census recorded the parish's population as 476.

== History ==
Sibford Ferris was part of the parish of Swalcliffe until 1841, when a new ecclesiastical parish of Sibford Gower, with Sibford Ferris and Burdrop was created. The Church of England parish church of the Holy Trinity in Burdrop was built in 1840 to serve the new parish. Sibford Ferris Manor House was built in the 17th century and remodelled in the 18th century. In 1842 the Society of Friends extended the house and converted it into a boarding school, Sibford School. In the 1930s the main part of the school relocated to buildings south of the village. In the early 2000s the manor was sold for private housing. There is a water mill on the Sib stream at Temple Mill Farm about 1 mile (1.6 km) southwest of the village. It was built in 1830. Home Close was designed and built in traditional Cotswold style by the Arts and Crafts movement architect M. H. Baillie Scott in 1911.

== Amenities ==
Sibford Ferris has a shop and sub-post office that serves all three villages.

== Sources ==
- Colvin, Christina; Cooper, Janet; Cooper, N.H.; Harvey, P.D.A.; Hollings, Marjory; Hook, Judith; Jessup, Mary; Lobel, Mary D.; Mason, J.F.A.; Trinder, B.S.; Turner, Hilary (1972). Crossley, Alan (ed.). A History of the County of Oxford. Victoria County History. Vol. 10: Banbury Hundred. London: Oxford University Press for the Institute of Historical Research. pp. 225–260. ISBN 978-0-19722-728-2.
- Sherwood, Jennifer; Pevsner, Nikolaus (1974). Oxfordshire. The Buildings of England. Harmondsworth: Penguin Books. p. 766. ISBN 0-14-071045-0.
