= Margate Lighthouse =

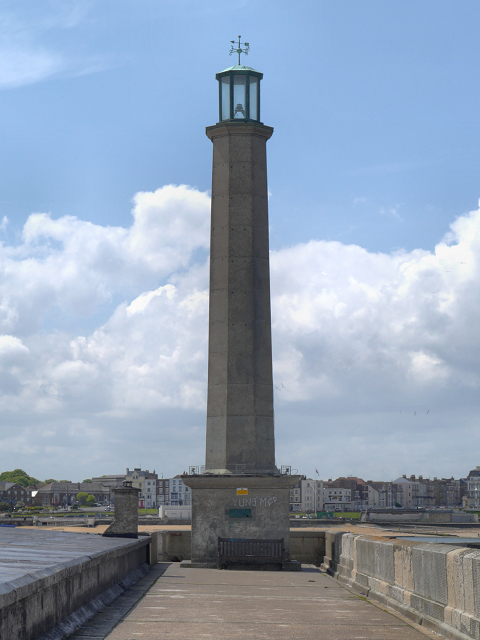
- Location: Margate, Kent
- Coordinates: 51.39080°N 1.37808°E

Tower
- Constructed: 1828 (first); 1955 (second)
- Designed by: William Edmunds
- Height: 20 m (66 ft)

Light
- Focal height: 18 m (59 ft)
- Characteristic: continuous red light

Margate Lighthouse is a lighthouse on the end of Margate harbour arm in Kent.

It is notable for featuring in the holographic windows on the plastic £20 note design featuring William turner who was known for his love of Margate sunsets.

== 1828 lighthouse ==
This lighthouse was designed by the architect William Edmunds and was completed in 1829. It was destroyed in the North Sea flood of 1953. The design was a round Doric column similar to the lighthouse at Whitby.

== 1955 lighthouse ==
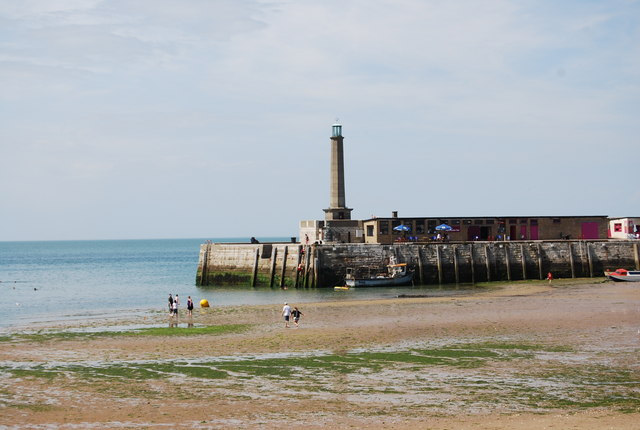

A replacement lighthouse with an octagonal column was built in 1955. This lighthouse features on the series G Bank of England £20 note along with the Turner Contemporary.
