= Tadmarton =

Village in Oxfordshire, England

Coordinates: 52°02′16″N 1°25′43″W

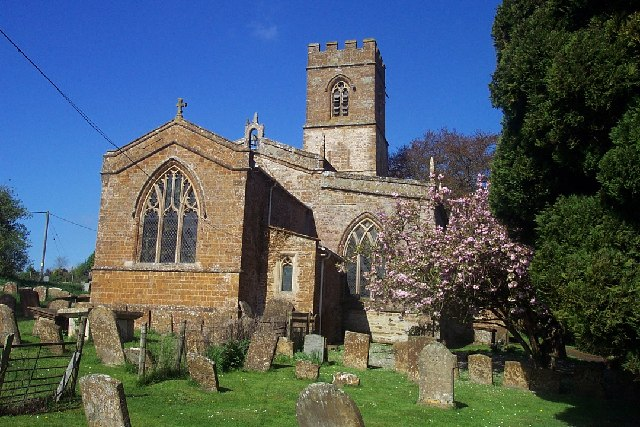
- St. Nicholas' parish church

- Location within Oxfordshire
- Area: 8.38 km^{2} (3.24 sq mi)
- Population: 541 (2011 Census)
  - Density: 65/km^{2} (170/sq mi)
- OS grid reference: SP3937
- Civil parish: Tadmarton
- District: Cherwell District
- Shire county: Oxfordshire
- Region: South East
- Country: England
- Sovereign state: United Kingdom
- Post town: Banbury
- Postcode district: OX15
- Dialling code: 01295
- Police: Thames Valley
- Fire: Oxfordshire
- Ambulance: South Central
- UK Parliament: Banbury
- Website: Tadmarton Village

Tadmarton is a village and civil parish about 4 miles (6.4 km) west of Banbury, Oxfordshire. The 2011 Census recorded the parish's population as 541, which is a 26% increase on the figure of 430 recorded by the 2001 Census.

== Manor ==
The manor house has a 15th-century barn, believed to have been built for Abingdon Abbey. Tadmarton House, a 19th century mansion, was built for Captain W L Lampet, the local landowner, in 1852.

== Parish church ==
The Church of England parish church of Saint Nicholas is early Norman. The building was enlarged and the bell tower added in the 13th century. The church is a Grade I listed building.

The tower has a ring of six bells. Four were originally cast early in the 17th century, but two of these were re-cast in 1923 and 1939. A fifth bell was added in 1761 and the treble was added in 1947.

== Air crash ==
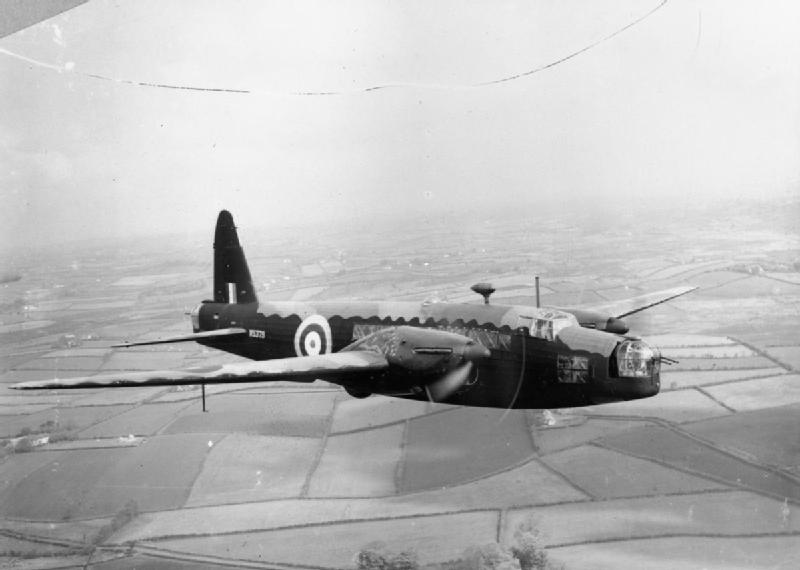
A Vickers Wellington in flight. This is a B Mk II, a model slightly earlier than the B Mk III that crashed at Swalcliffe.

On 31 May 1944 a Vickers Wellington B Mk III bomber aircraft, BK157 of No. 12 Operational Training Unit RAF based at Chipping Warden in Northamptonshire, was on a training flight over north Oxfordshire when the pilot, F/O Donald Driver, DFM, made an evasive diving turn to port. The port wing collapsed and the aircraft crashed at Tadmarton. It burst into flames and all seven crew were killed.

The crew were members of the Royal Air Force Volunteer Reserve. F/O Driver and one of the air gunners are buried in Southam Road Cemetery in Banbury, which has a Commonwealth War Graves section. Other members of the crew are buried at Downpatrick in County Down, Hounslow in Middlesex, Huntly in Aberdeenshire, Titchfield in Hampshire and Wick in Caithness.

== Amenities ==
Tadmarton has one public house, the Lampet Arms.

== See also ==
- Pyrton in South Oxfordshire, where an RAF Vickers Wellington Mk IC bomber aircraft crashed in 1943.

== Sources and further reading ==
- Lobel, Mary D; Crossley, Alan, eds. (1969). A History of the County of Oxford: Volume 9. Victoria County History. pp. 150–159.
- Sherwood, Jennifer; Pevsner, Nikolaus (1974). Oxfordshire. The Buildings of England. Harmondsworth: Penguin Books. pp. 803–804. ISBN 0-14-071045-0.
