= Holy Trinity Church, Margate =

Church in Kent, UK

Coordinates: 51.3805°N 1.4147°E

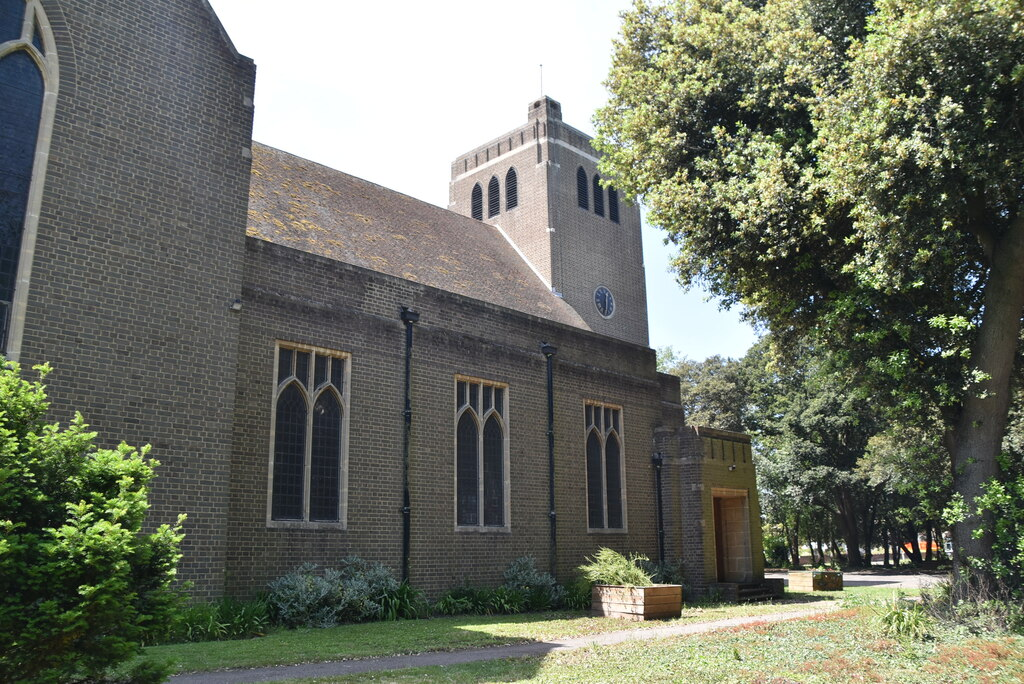
Holy Trinity Church

Holy Trinity Church, Margate is a Church of England church in Margate, Kent, and in the Diocese of Canterbury.

== Original Trinity Church ==
The growth of Margate during the early 19th century meant that the old church of St John was no longer large enough. The Church building act 1818 provided partial funding for church building. 24 designs were considered and that of William Edmunds was chosen.

=== Building ===
The foundation stone was laid on 28 September 1825. A procession from the garden of Hawley Square to the site of the new church was held beforehand, including the Archbishop of Canterbury, Sir Edward Knatchbull, MP for Kent, the Vicar, the Rev. W. F. Baylay, William Edmunds and local dignitaries.

The church required more funds than initially thought and was finally consecrated on 11 June 1829.

=== Destruction ===
During WWII at 13:10 on 1 June 1943, during raids by the German Luftwaffe, the church chancel area was hit by a bomb dropped from a Focke-Wulf fighter bomber blowing the roof off and collapsing the north side gallery and part of the wall - ten people were killed, four seriously injured and forty-six slightly injured. The church was reduced to a shell, though the tower at the other end survived virtually undamaged. The tower later being demolished during 1958 and 1959 around the time that the new Holy Trinity church was dedicated and opened.

== New church ==
The church was rebuilt between 1957 and 1959 in St Mary's Avenue near Northdown Park, Cliftonville, adjoining St Mary's Chapel, the architect was Harold Anderson.
