= St Mary's Church, Dover =

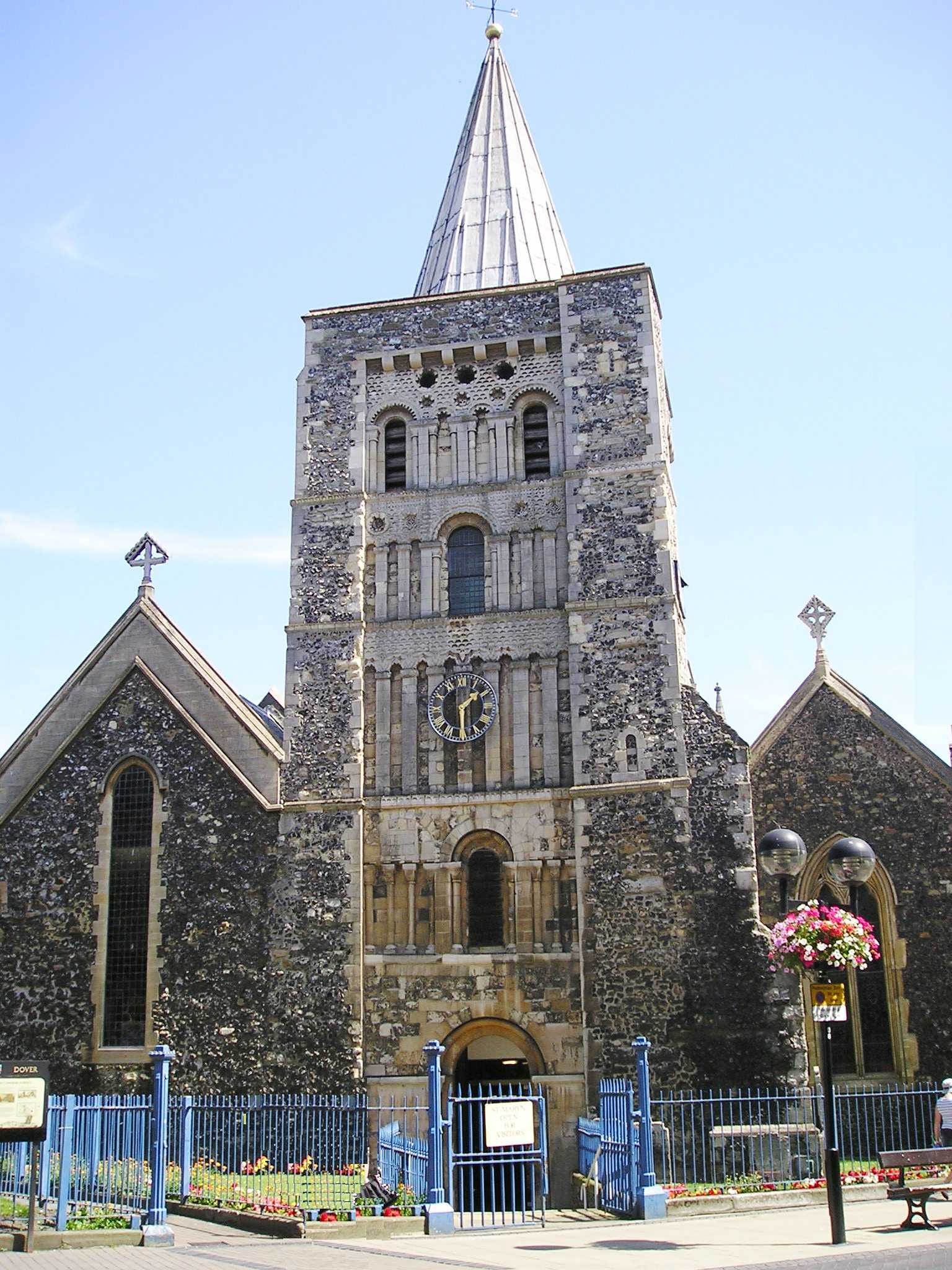
- St Mary's Church, Dover
- 51°7.5539′N 1°18.7730′E
- OS grid reference: TR 319 415
- Location: Dover
- Country: England
- Denomination: Church of England
- Website: http://stmarysdover.org.uk/

History
- Dedication: Saint Mary the Virgin

Architecture
- Heritage designation: Grade II*
- Designated: 30 June 1949

Administration
- Diocese: Diocese of Canterbury
- Deanery: Dover Deanery

The Church of St Mary the Virgin is a Grade II* listed Anglican church, a parish church in Dover, Kent, and is situated on Cannon Street in the town centre. There was a church on this site in Saxon times. It was largely rebuilt in the 19th century.

== Early history ==
The church stands on the site of Roman baths; it is thought there was originally a Saxon church here. Three churches in Dover are mentioned in the Domesday Book, and it has been supposed that these are St Mary's, St James' and St Peter's. The oldest parts of the existing building are the tower and three bays of the arcades, which are Norman architecture of the early 12th century.

From 1230 the church was controlled by Maison Dieu, which was built in Dover in 1203 to accommodate pilgrims from overseas visiting Canterbury Cathedral.

The church was closed in 1537, at the Dissolution of the Monasteries, but opened in 1544 as a parish church, after a petition of the townspeople. From 1581 it was the official church of the Mayor and corporation instead of St Peter's Church (which stood on the northern side of the market square and was in disrepair; it was demolished soon afterwards).

== Rebuilding ==
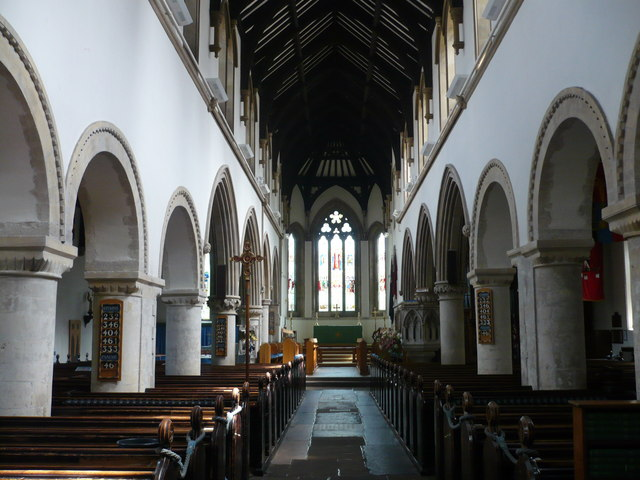
The nave of the church

In 1843–1844, during the incumbency of Canon John Puckle, the church, except for the tower, was rebuilt in Early English style. The work was carried out by J. C. & C. Buckler. The church was enlarged and clerestory windows were added. The tower was restored in 1897.

The church was damaged during the Second World War, but was not directly hit. Many of the stained glass windows were destroyed. Windows have been installed since the war to commemorate important relations between the church and the town.

== Bells ==
The church has eight bells, originally made by Samuel Knight in 1724. In 1898, at the time the tower was restored, the bells were rehung in a new frame by John Warner & Sons, who recast the treble bell. The bells have since then been rehung twice, in 1947 and 2002.

== Memorial ==
The church houses the main memorial to the victims of the Herald of Free Enterprise, which capsized outside Zeebrugge in Belgium on its way to Dover on 6 March 1987.
