= Sibford Gower =

Village in Oxfordshire, England

Coordinates: 52.047°N 01.455°W

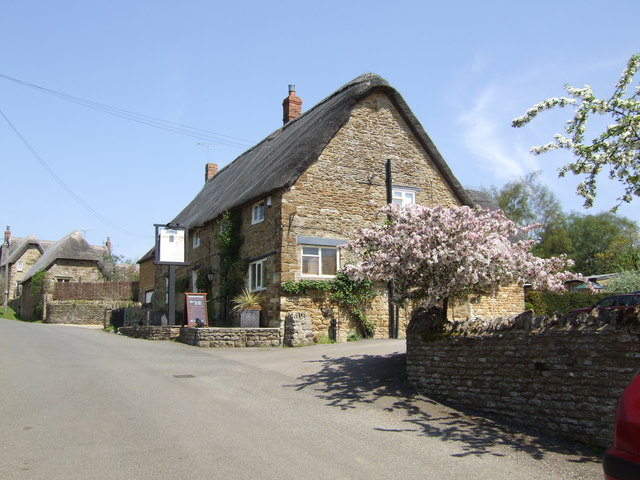
- The Wykham Arms

- Location within Oxfordshire
- Area: 7.09 km^{2} (2.74 sq mi)
- Population: 508 (parish, including Burdrop) (2011 Census)
  - Density: 72/km^{2} (190/sq mi)
- OS grid reference: SP3537
- Civil parish: Sibford Gower
- District: Cherwell
- Shire county: Oxfordshire
- Region: South East
- Country: England
- Sovereign state: United Kingdom
- Post town: Banbury
- Postcode district: OX15
- Dialling code: 01295
- Police: Thames Valley
- Fire: Oxfordshire
- Ambulance: South Central
- UK Parliament: Banbury
- Website: The Sibfords

Sibford Gower is a village and civil parish about 6.5 miles (10.5 km) west of Banbury in Oxfordshire, on the north side of the Sib valley, opposite Sibford Ferris. Sibford Gower parish includes the village of Burdrop. The 2011 Census recorded the parish's population as 508. Much of the village is a conservation area.

== Manors ==
The Domesday Book of 1086 records two Norman-held manors at Sibford Gower. In 1086 William, son of Corbicion held 10 hides there, which was assessed as one knight's fee. By 1122 Henry de Beaumont, 1st Earl of Warwick held this manor. The last known reference to its feudal overlordship was under Richard Neville, 16th Earl of Warwick in 1458. By 1190 the feoffee of the Beaumont manor was a Norman, William Goher. In the 1220s the family seem to have rebelled against the Crown and forfeited their lands, but by 1242–43 Thomas Goher had recovered the estate. The "Gower" part of the village's toponym is derived from a variant of "Goher".

The other manor was of 11 hides and was held by Hugh de Grandmesnil. His son Ivo de Grandmesnil mortgaged the family estates to Robert de Beaumont, Count of Meulan in 1102. Ivo died that same year, and the Crown allowed de Beaumont to keep the Grandmesnil estates. In 1204 Robert de Beaumont, 4th Earl of Leicester died childless, leaving Sibford Gower to his younger sister Margaret, wife of Saer de Quincy. When their son Roger de Quincy, 2nd Earl of Winchester died in 1264 Sibford Gower passed to his eldest daughter Ellen or Helen, wife of Alan la Zouche.

She left it to their grandson Alan la Zouche, 1st Baron la Zouche of Ashby, who left it to his daughter Maud, wife of Robert de Holland, 1st Baron Holand. In 1328 Holland was executed for treason, but his family kept the manor and it passed to his son Thomas Holland, 1st Earl of Kent. He left it to his niece Maud, wife of John Lovel, 5th Baron Lovel, who held the manor in 1374. It descended with his heirs until John Lovel, 8th Baron Lovel, who died in 1465. No subsequent records of the overlordship of this manor are known. His son Francis Lovell, 1st Viscount Lovell supported Richard III in the Wars of the Roses and fought at the Battle of Bosworth Field. Lovell survived Richard's defeat but Henry VII ordered the forfeiture of all his titles.

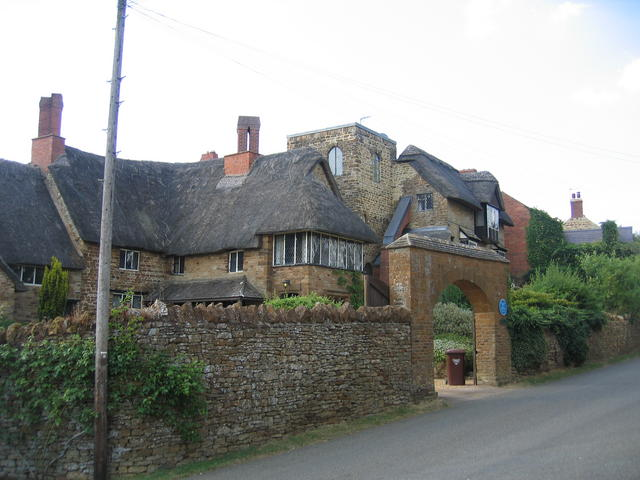
Sibford Gower Manor House

In about 1225 William of Wheatfield, feoffee of the de Quincy manor, granted land in Sibford Gower to the Knights Templar, who had held land in neighbouring Sibford Ferris since the middle of the 12th century. Slightly later the elder Alan la Zouche also granted land to them. In 1314, when the last of the Knights Templar in England were suppressed, their estate at Sibford Gower was 10 yardlands and was assessed as 1/4 of a knight's fee.

Sibford Gower Manor House was built in the 17th century. Frank Lascelles, who grew up in the village, had it substantially remodelled between 1907 and 1915. Until 1773 Sibford Gower had a single open field of 80 yardlands. In 1774 the inclosure award for Sibford Gower divided 1,666 acres (674 ha) between 48 landholders. The largest award was 257 acres (104 ha) to New College, Oxford, which had held the rectory of Swalcliffe since 1389 and over the years had extended its estates into Sibford Gower.

== Meeting-house, chapel and church ==
A Quaker congregation was established in the village by 1669, when it met in the home of the clockmaker Thomas Gilkes. In 1678 or 1681 a Quaker meeting-house was built on land bought for the purpose by Bray D'Oyley, Thomas Fardon and Thomas Gilkes. By 1682 it had a burial ground. In 1736 a gallery was added inside the meeting-house to accommodate its growing congregation. The 1851 Census recorded that 112 people attended its Sunday meeting. In 1865 the old meeting-house was replaced with the present one southwest of the village, on the road to Hook Norton.

Sibford Gower had a Wesleyan congregation by the first decade of the 19th century, for which a chapel was built in 1827. The 1851 Census recorded that it held two Sunday services, with congregations of 95 and 112. It became part of the Methodist Union in 1932 and was a member of the Chipping Norton and Stow-on-the-Wold Circuit. It was refurbished in 1962–63 and closed in June 2014. Sibford Gower was part of the Church of England parish of Swalcliffe until 1841, when a new ecclesiastical parish of Sibford Gower, with Sibford Ferris and Burdrop was created. The Church of England parish church of the Holy Trinity in Burdrop was built in 1840 to serve the new parish.

== Clockmakers ==
Sibford Gower became associated with clockmaking in the 17th century. Thomas Gilkes was born in Sibford Gower in about 1665 and pioneered clockmaking in north Oxfordshire. There is no known record of where he learnt his trade, but as he was a Quaker he would have been apprenticed to a fellow Quaker; possibly Richard Gilkes of the Worshipful Company of Clockmakers in London. Thomas Gilkes died in 1743. Thomas Gilkes trained two of his sons as clockmakers: a third Thomas (1704–57), who then worked in Charlbury as both a clockmaker and a Quaker minister, and Richard (1715–87) who established his business in West Adderbury. John Fardon (1700–43) of Deddington also served his apprenticeship with the elder Thomas Gilkes in Sibford.

Gilkes pioneered a clockmaking industry in north Oxfordshire villages with such success that his fellow-Quakers, including several further members of the Gilkes and Fardon families, dominated the trade in parts of the district for the next 150 years. Later clockmakers in Sibford Gower were also Quakers. John Wells' date of birth is unknown but he was married in the Friends' Meeting House in 1785. He moved his business to Shipston-on-Stour in Warwickshire, and he died in 1809. Ezra Enock or Enoch (1799–1860) was born in Sibford Gower. From 1827 he traded in Whitechapel in East London, but in 1832 he returned to Sibford Gower where he remained for the rest of his life. His son John Enock (1834–83) traded as a clock repairer in adjoining villages.

== Amenities ==
Sibford Gower had a school by 1612 and its first schoolroom was built in 1623. A new cottage for the schoolmaster was built in 1818. In 1825 the school had 59 pupils, but this declined to 40 in 1833. The vicar of Swalcliffe complained in 1837 that the charity was mismanaged, its buildings were ruinous and the master and his wife were not competent. In 1866 the buildings were replaced with a new school and master's house. Pupil numbers recovered to 56 in 1871 and 68 in 1890. Quakers and Wesleyans in the parish held a public meeting in 1891 at which they objected to the school being classified as Church of England.

The Charity Commissioners agreed that there was no specific requirement for its pupils to be taught in accordance with the Church of England. The school was enlarged and in 1903 could accommodate 139 pupils, but actual attendance averaged 81. It was enlarged again in 1960 and is now an Endowed Primary School. In 1782 Sibford Gower had only one pub, the King's Arms. The Wykham Arms was licensed as an ale-house by 1793. It was built in the 17th century, possibly as a farmhouse. The King's Arms is no longer trading, and the Wykham Arms is now a gastropub.

== Sources ==
- Beeson, C.F.C. (1989) [1962]. Simcock, A.V (ed.). Clockmaking in Oxfordshire 1400–1850 (3rd ed.). Oxford: Museum of the History of Science. ISBN 0-903364-06-9.
- Crossley, Alan, ed. (1972). A History of the County of Oxford. Victoria County History. Vol. 10: Banbury Hundred. London: Oxford University Press for the Institute of Historical Research. pp. 225–260. ISBN 978-0-19722-728-2.
- Ryan, Deborah (1999). "The man who staged the Empire: Remembering Frank Lascelles in Sibford Gower, 1875–2000". In Kwint, Marius; Breward, Christopher; Aynsley, Jeremy (eds.). Material Memories: Design and Evocation (Materializing Culture). London: Bloomsbury Publishing. pp. 159–179. ISBN 1859732526.
- Sherwood, Jennifer; Pevsner, Nikolaus (1974). Oxfordshire. The Buildings of England. Harmondsworth: Penguin Books. p. 767. ISBN 0-14-071045-0.
