= Barford St John =

Village in Oxfordshire, England

Coordinates: 51.996°N 01.363°W

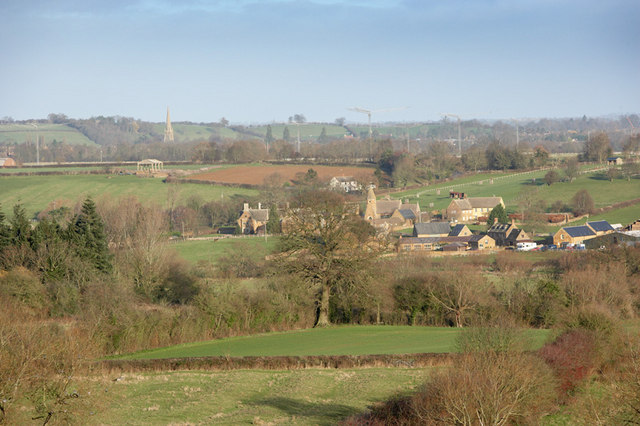
- Barford St. John seen from across the Swere valley below Hempton. RAF Barford St John is beyond the village and St. Mary's parish church, Bloxham is in the distance.

- Location within Oxfordshire
- OS grid reference: SP4333
- Civil parish: Barford St. John and St. Michael
- District: Cherwell
- Shire county: Oxfordshire
- Region: South East
- Country: England
- Sovereign state: United Kingdom
- Post town: Banbury
- Postcode district: OX15
- Dialling code: 01295
- Police: Thames Valley
- Fire: Oxfordshire
- Ambulance: South Central
- UK Parliament: Banbury
- Website: Barford St John & St Michael Parish Council

Barford St John is a small village in the civil parish of Barford St John and St Michael, in the Cherwell district of Oxfordshire, England. It is on the north bank of the River Swere, about 5 miles (8 km) south of Banbury. In the Middle Ages it was sometimes called Little Barford or North Barford to distinguish it from the larger village of Barford St Michael on the opposite bank of the Swere.

== Chapel ==
The Church of England chapel of St John was built in about 1150, but only the south doorway and the font survive from this period. The chancel was rebuilt in the 13th century, and the Decorated Gothic windows in the nave were added in the 14th century. There was a tower at the southwest corner of the church, with the date 1622 on a stone near the top. In 1860–61 the Gothic Revival architect G.E. Street rebuilt the church, demolishing the tower and replacing it with a new one over the south porch.

St John's was built as a chapel of ease to the parish church at Adderbury. Barford St John and Barford St Michael were united as a single ecclesiastical parish called Barford St Michael with Barford St John in 1890. The ecclesiastical parish now forms part of a single benefice with nearby Deddington and Hempton.

== RAF station ==
RAF Barford St John was established just north of the village in 1941. It ceased flying operations in 1946 but the United States Air Force has used it as a radiocommunications centre since 1951.

== Governance ==
Barford St John was formerly a chapelry in the parish of Adderbury in the Bloxham hundred of Oxfordshire. Parish functions under the poor laws from the 17th century onwards were administered separately for the chaplery of Barford St John and other parts of Adderbury parish. Barford St John therefore became a separate civil parish in 1866 when the legal definition of 'parish' was changed to be the areas used for administering the poor laws.

Having already been merged for ecclesiastical purposes in 1890, the two Barfords were subsequently also merged for civil purposes in 1932, becoming a new civil parish called Barford St John and St Michael, subject to an adjustment at the same time to the boundary with the neighbouring parish of Deddington. At the 1931 census, (the last before the abolition of the civil parish) Barford St John had a population of 53.

== Sources ==
- Lobel, Mary D; Crossley, Alan, eds. (1969). A History of the County of Oxford: Volume 9. Victoria County History. pp. 5–44.
- Sherwood, Jennifer; Pevsner, Nikolaus (1974). Oxfordshire. The Buildings of England. Harmondsworth: Penguin Books. p. 445. ISBN 0-14-071045-0.
