= Barford St. John and St. Michael =

Coordinates: 51.993°N 1.364°W

- Civil parish
- Location within Oxfordshire
- Civil parish: Barford St. John and St. Michael
- District: Cherwell
- Shire county: Oxfordshire
- Region: South East
- Country: England
- Sovereign state: United Kingdom
- Post town: Banbury
- Postcode district: OX15
- Dialling code: 01869; 01295
- Police: Thames Valley
- Fire: Oxfordshire
- Ambulance: South Central
- UK Parliament: Banbury

Barford St John and St Michael is a civil parish in the Cherwell district of Oxfordshire, England. It includes the adjacent villages of Barford St. Michael and Barford St. John, which stand either side of the River Swere. At the 2011 census the parish had a population of 549 mainly clustered into the two nucleated villages surrounded by green fields and woodland. The total parish area is 7.48 km^{2} .
