= Deddington Town Hall =

Municipal building in Oxfordshire, England

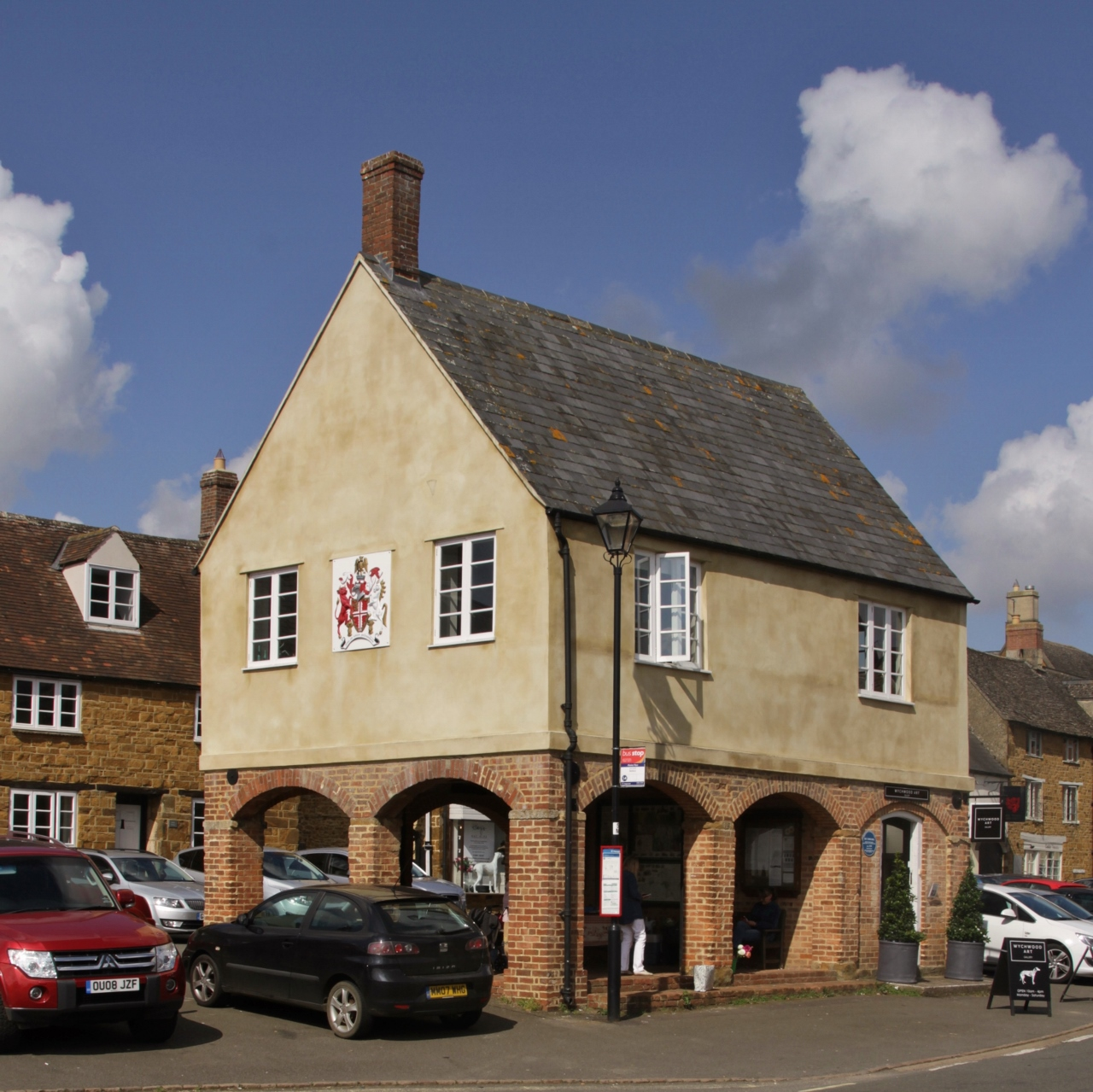
- Deddington Town Hall

- Shown in Oxfordshire
- 51.9814°N 1.3216°W
- Location: Market Place, Deddington

History
- Built: 1611

Site notes
- Architectural style: Neoclassical style

Listed Building – Grade II
- Official name: Town Hall
- Designated: 5 May 1988
- Reference no.: 1300780

Deddington Town Hall is a municipal building in the Market Place in Deddington in Oxfordshire, England. The structure, which is used for community events, is a Grade II listed building.

== History ==
The building was established as a meeting place for the Guild of the Holy Trinity, a religious group of merchants in the town, in around 1611. The building was arcaded, so that markets could be held with an assembly hall an assembly room on the first floor. Feoffees were appointed to establish a proper system for the administration of the tolls in the market place in April 1612.

After the original building became dilapidated, the ground floor was rebuilt and the first floor of the original structure restored, in 1806. The work was undertaken at the expense of the three local lords of the manor, the feoffees and the parish council. The ground floor remained open, with new arcades of brick jack arches supporting the first floor. The design involved a symmetrical main frontage facing east onto the Market Place; the first floor was fenestrated by two casement windows on the east side, two smaller casement windows on the south side and two casement windows, stacked one above the other, on the north side. The open ground floor was for market stalls: three butchers each ran a stall there, and paid rent which was donated to the town's charity for the poor. The assembly room on the first floor was used for vestry meetings and for judicial hearings.

Repairs to the building were carried out in 1832, and, after the feoffees had re-titled themselves as trustees in 1856, the first floor was converted into a public library and reading room in 1858, with the ground floor arches being bricked up to form a fire station in which to keep the horse-drawn fire engine, which until then had been kept in the parish church. Local hustings in the Oxfordshire by-election in February 1862, which was won by the Conservative Party candidate, John Fane, were held under the town hall. During the Second World War, the building was requisitioned for use by the local platoon of the Home Guard.

The trustees used the assembly hall as their meeting place until 1966 when they leased the building to the parish council who then started using the assembly room as their meeting place. An exhibition on the life of Cardinal John Newman was held at the town hall in September 2000. Following an extensive refurbishment, which involved restoring the fabric of the structure and installing the coat of arms of the parish council on the southern elevation, the building was reopened by the local member of parliament, Victoria Prentis, on 26 September 2015. The north end of the ground floor of the building was subsequently let as an art gallery.
