= Barford St Michael =

Village in Oxfordshire, England

Coordinates: 51.99°N 01.37°W

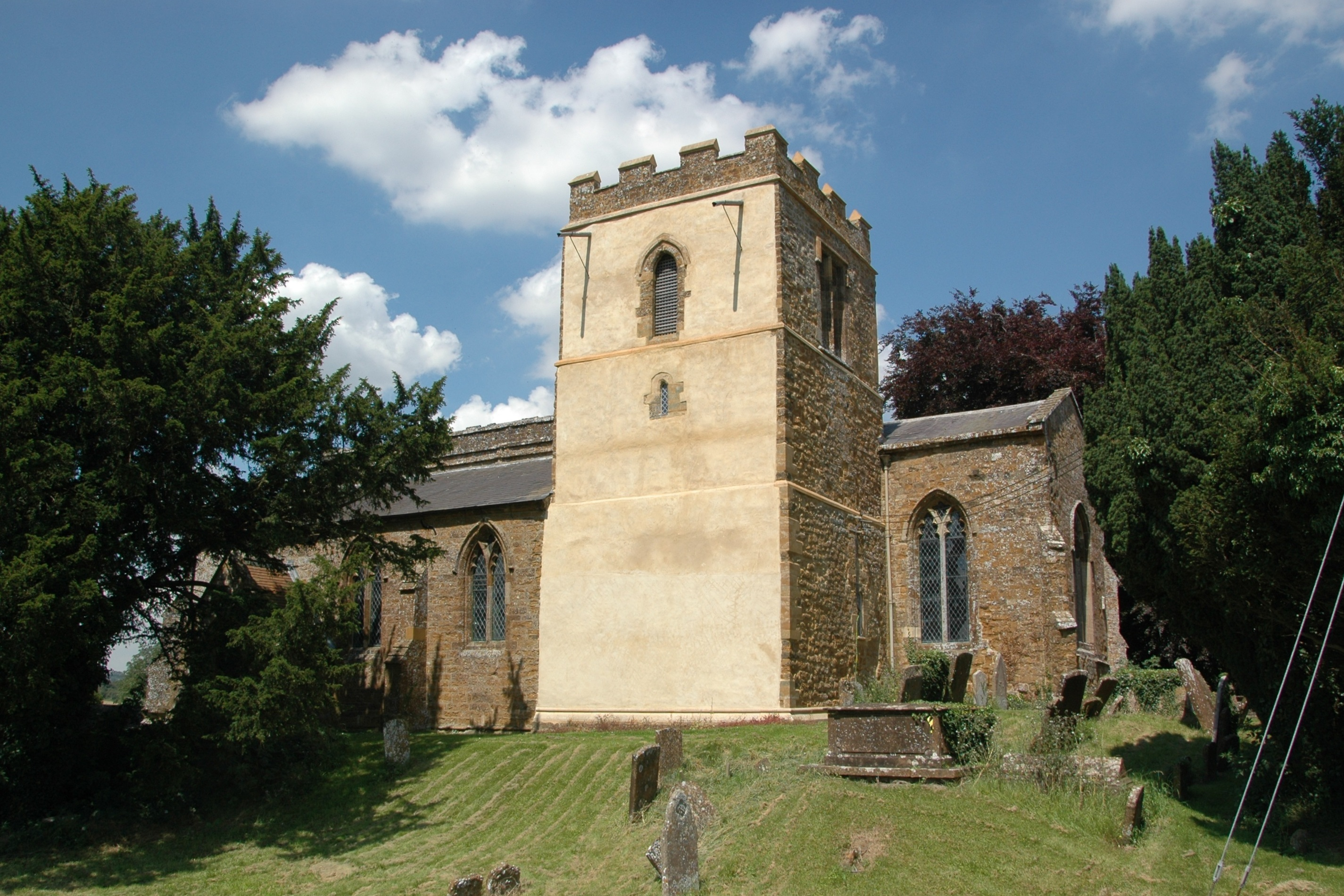
- St Michael's parish church

- Location within Oxfordshire
- OS grid reference: SP4332
- Civil parish: Barford St. John and St. Michael
- District: Cherwell
- Shire county: Oxfordshire
- Region: South East
- Country: England
- Sovereign state: United Kingdom
- Post town: Banbury
- Postcode district: OX15
- Dialling code: 01869
- Police: Thames Valley
- Fire: Oxfordshire
- Ambulance: South Central
- UK Parliament: Banbury

Barford St Michael is a village in the civil parish of Barford St John and St Michael, in the Cherwell district of Oxfordshire, England. It is on the south bank of the River Swere, about 5 miles (8 km) south of Banbury.

== History ==
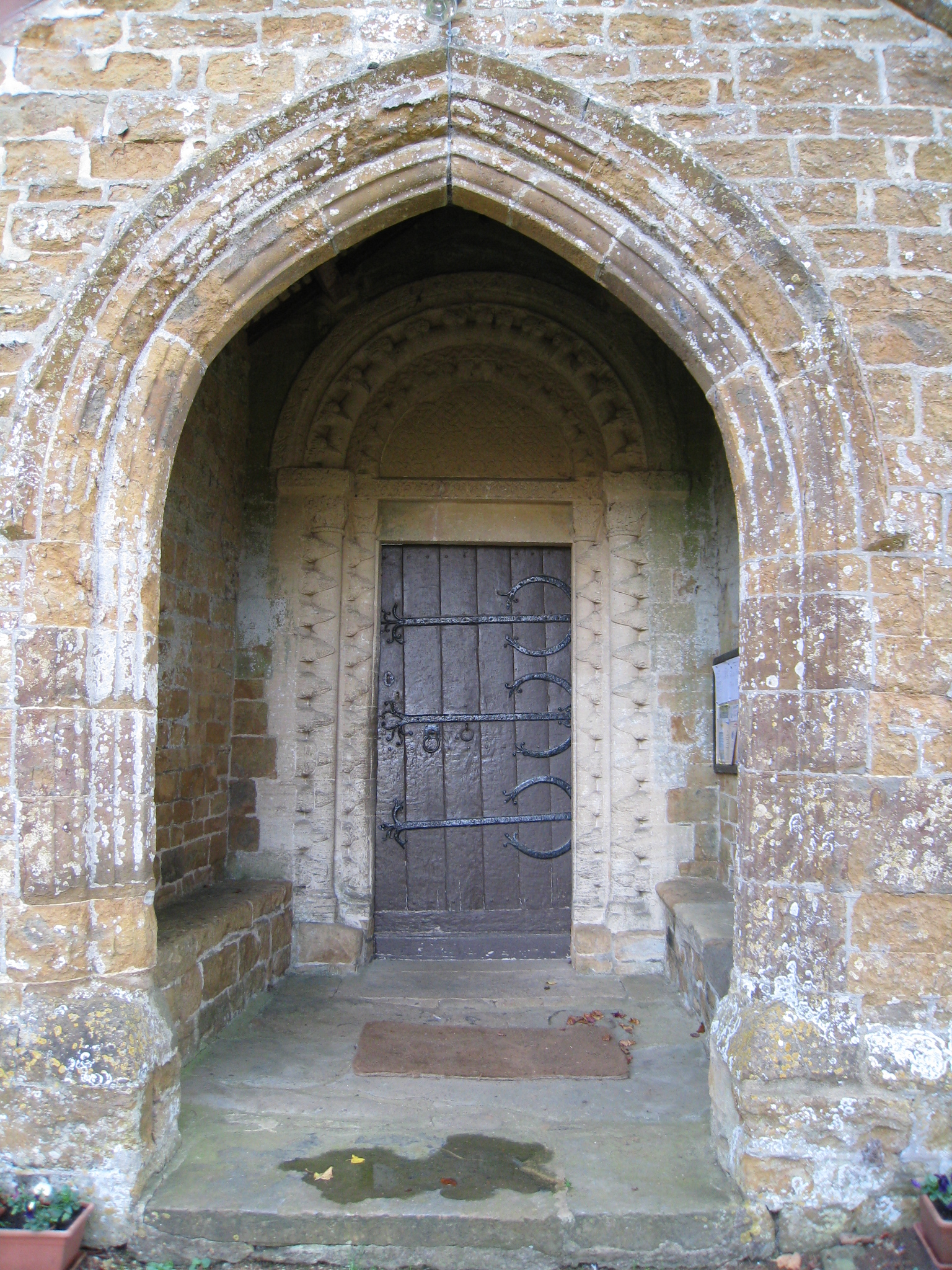
North door of St Michael's church: Norman doorway within Gothic porch

Barford St Michael has sometimes been called Great Barford as it is much larger than the village of Barford St John on the opposite bank of the Swere.

The bell tower and north doorway of Church of England parish church of St Michael are Norman. Much of the rest of the church was rebuilt in the 13th century in the Early English Gothic style. It is a Grade I listed building. In August 1549 the vicar, James Webbe, was executed at Aylesbury for his part in leading a rising in protest at the abolition of the Latin liturgy and other religious reforms. The village has one public house, the George Inn. It was built in 1697 and in the 20th century was a Hunt Edmunds tied house. There is also a farm shop. Woodworm Records Recording Studio is based in the village.

Barford St Michael was an ancient parish in the Wootton hundred of Oxfordshire. In 1890 the parish was merged for ecclesiastical purposes with the neighbouring parish of Barford St John (which had historically been a chapelry in the parish of Adderbury) to form an ecclesiastical parish called Barford St Michael with Barford St John. The two Barfords were subsequently also merged for civil purposes in 1932, becoming a new civil parish called Barford St John and St Michael, subject to an adjustment at the same time to the boundary with the neighbouring parish of Deddington. At the 1931 census (the last before the abolition of the civil parish), Barford St Michael had a population of 186.
