= Robert Boyd Publications =

British book publishing company

Coordinates: 51.779797°N 1.495483°W

- Industry: Publishing
- Headquarters: Witney, Oxfordshire, United Kingdom

Robert Boyd Publications is a book publishing company based in Witney, Oxfordshire, England. It concentrates on books covering the history of Oxfordshire in general and Oxford in particular, including "The Changing Faces of ..." book series.

They have published 70 works between 1994 and 2020. Authors they have worked for include Carole Newbigging, Julie Kennedy and Ann Spokes Symonds.
