= Hempton, Oxfordshire =

Village in Oxfordshire, England

Coordinates: 51.983°N 01.355°W

Hempton
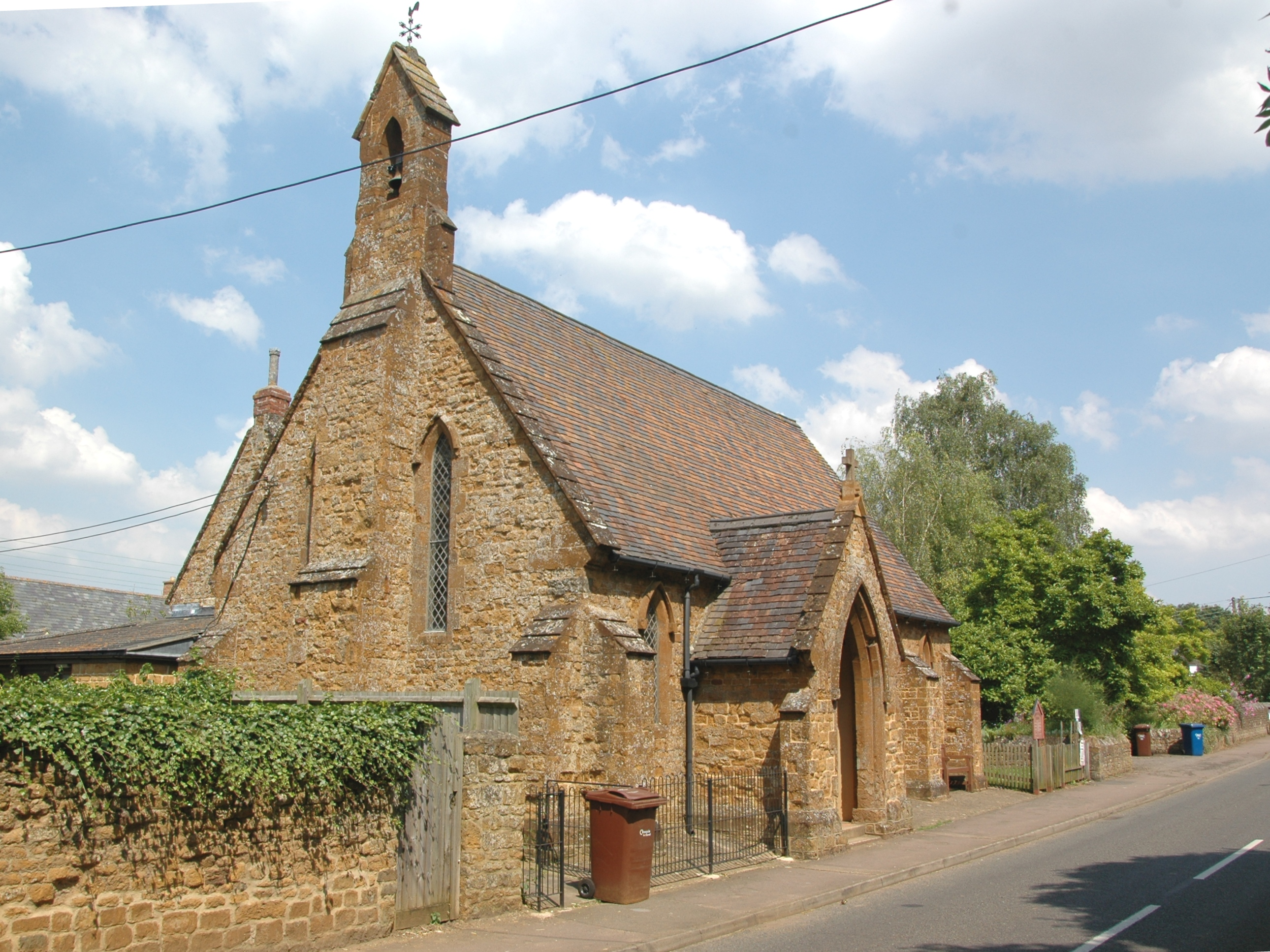
- St John the Evangelist parish church

- Location within Oxfordshire
- OS grid reference: SP4431
- Civil parish: Deddington
- District: Cherwell
- Shire county: Oxfordshire
- Region: South East
- Country: England
- Sovereign state: United Kingdom
- Post town: Banbury
- Postcode district: OX15
- Dialling code: 01869
- Police: Thames Valley
- Fire: Oxfordshire
- Ambulance: South Central
- UK Parliament: Banbury
- Website: Deddington Online

Hempton is a village in Deddington civil parish about 5 miles (8 km) south of Banbury in Oxfordshire. Hempton is on the B4031 road between Deddington and Chipping Norton, which was a turnpike from 1770 until 1871.

== Chapel and church ==
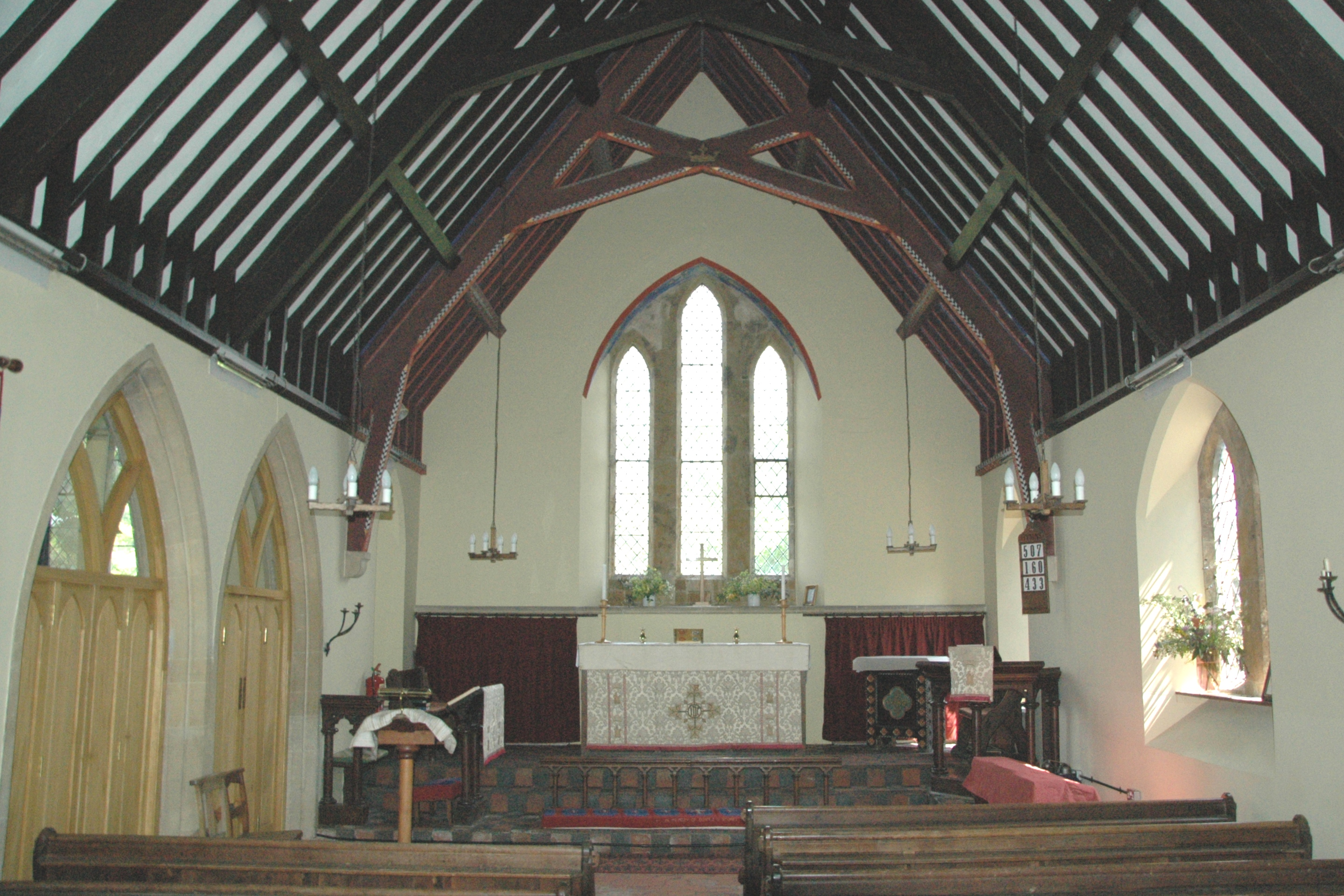
St John the Evangelist parish church: inside the nave, looking east towards the chancel

Hempton has a former nonconformist chapel that is said to have been opened in 1840. It ceased to be used for worship in the 1950s and is now a private house. The Church of England parish church of St. John the Evangelist was completed in 1850 or 1851. Rev. William Wilson of Over Worton designed the Gothic Revival building and funded its construction. The building has Early English style lancet windows and a two-bay north arcade that led to a schoolroom. The church's font is a Norman one from Holy Trinity parish church, Over Worton. In its early decades St. John's was a licensed but unconsecrated chapel and independent of the Benefice of Deddington, but is now part of the benefice.

== Economic and social history ==
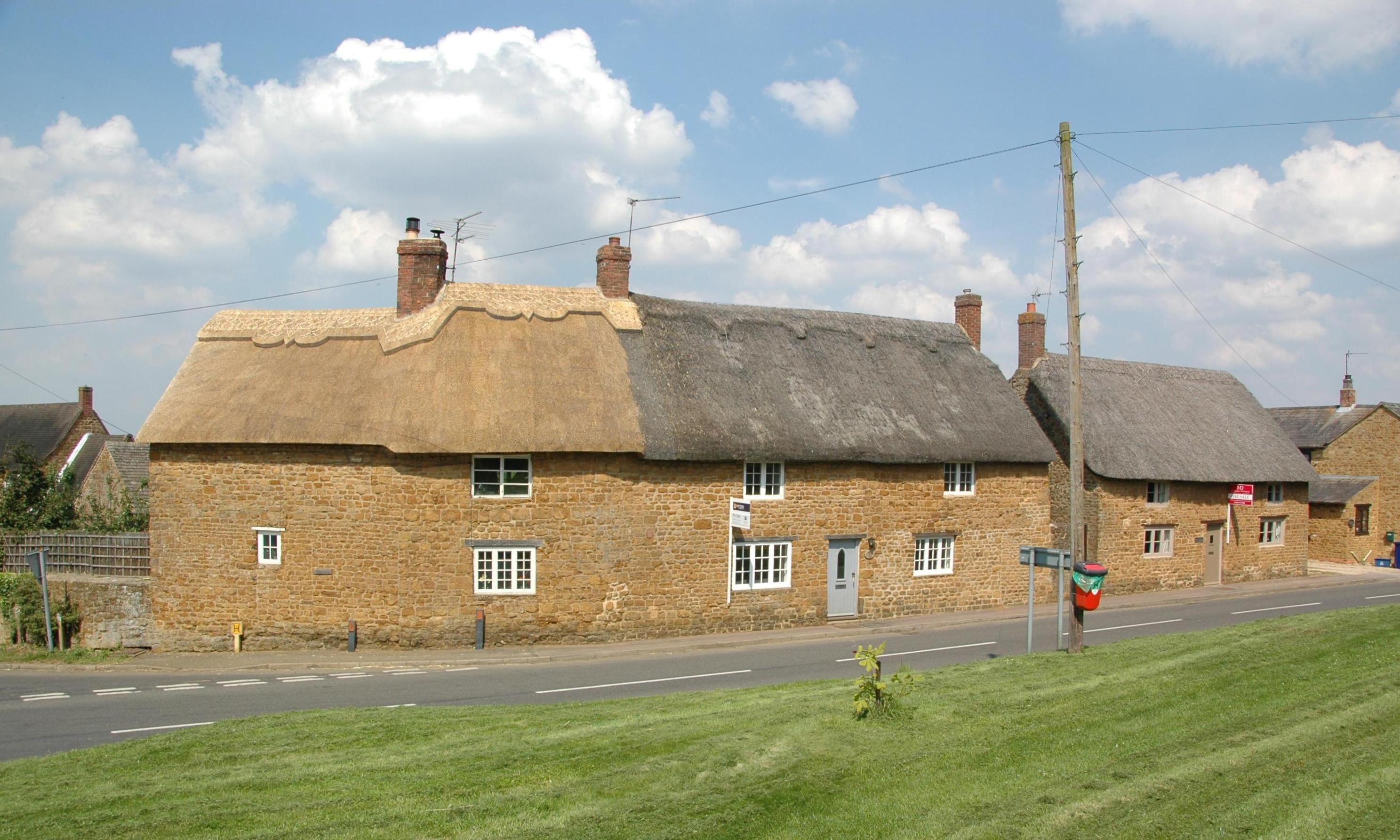
Early 18th century cottages in Hempton. From left to right: Turret Thatch, Middle Corner Cottage and Top Thatch

Hempton has a number of cottages that were built late in the 17th or early in the 18th century. Turret Cottage and Middle Corner Cottage are early 18th century, and plaque between them records that they were restored in 1976 with the help of the CPRE Oxfordshire Buildings Preservation Trust Ltd.

== Sources and further reading ==
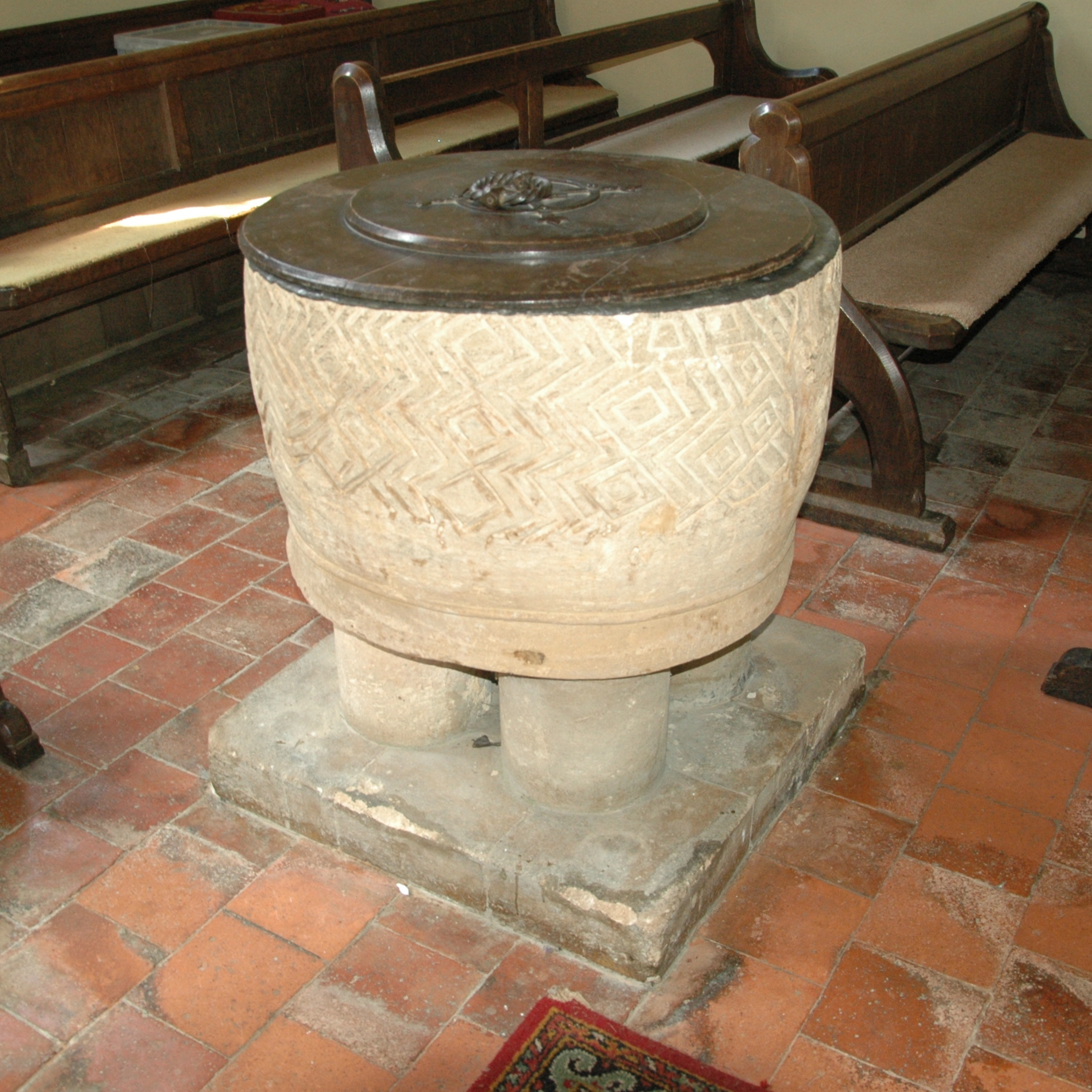
St John the Evangelist parish church: 12th century Norman font from Holy Trinity parish church, Over Worton

- Allbrook, Michael; Forsyth, Robert (2011). A Parish at War; A military record of three Oxfordshire villages; Deddington — Clifton — Hempton. Oxford: Oxford Publishing Ltd. ISBN 978-1-870677-04-2.
- Allbrook, Michael; Forsyth, Robert (2012). A Parish at War; A military record of three Oxfordshire villages; Deddington — Clifton — Hempton; The Supplement. Oxford: Oxford Publishing Ltd.
- Crossley, Alan (ed.); Baggs, A.P.; Colvin, Christina; Colvin, H.M.; Cooper, Janet; Day, C.J.; Selwyn, Nesta; Tomkinson, A. (1983). A History of the County of Oxford, Volume 11: Wootton Hundred (northern part). Victoria County History. pp. 81–120.
- Sherwood, Jennifer; Pevsner, Nikolaus (1974). Oxfordshire. The Buildings of England. Harmondsworth: Penguin Books. p. 635. ISBN 0-14-071045-0.
