= Deddington =

Town in Oxfordshire, England

Coordinates: 51.982°N 1.323°W

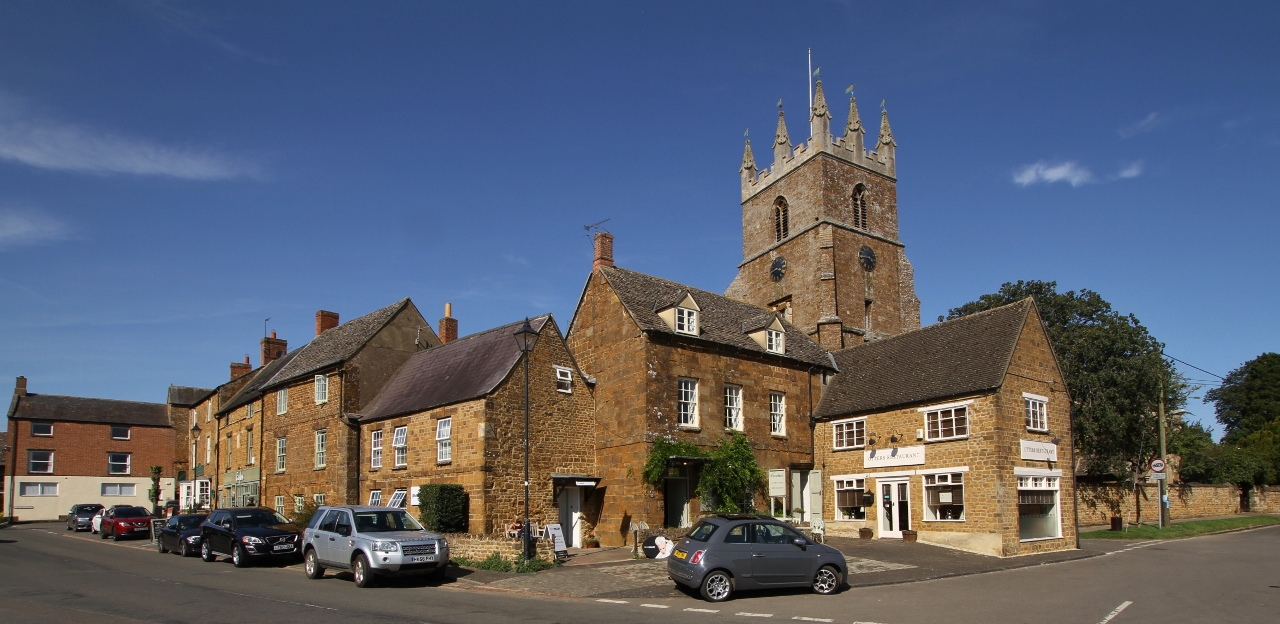
- Houses at the north end of Market Place, with the parish church tower behind them

- Location within Oxfordshire
- Area: 6.65 sq mi (17.2 km^{2})
- Population: 2,146 (parish, including Clifton & Hempton) (2011 Census)
  - Density: 320/sq mi (125/km2)
- OS grid reference: SP4631
- Civil parish: Deddington
- District: Cherwell
- Shire county: Oxfordshire
- Region: South East
- Country: England
- Sovereign state: United Kingdom
- Post town: Banbury
- Postcode district: OX15
- Dialling code: 01869
- Police: Thames Valley
- Fire: Oxfordshire
- Ambulance: South Central
- UK Parliament: Banbury
- Website: Deddington Online

Deddington is a town and civil parish in Oxfordshire, England, 6 miles (10 km) south of Banbury. The parish includes two hamlets, Clifton and Hempton. The 2011 Census recorded the parish's population as 2,146. It has been a market town since the 12th century. One of the Hundred Rolls of King Edward I from 1275–76 records Deddington as a borough.

== Geography ==
The parish is about 3 miles (5 km) wide east–west, about 2 miles (3 km) wide north–south and has an area of about 4,246 acres (1,718 ha). Watercourses bound it on three sides: The River Cherwell to the east, its tributary the River Swere to the north and the Sowbrook (i.e. "South Brook") to the south. Here the Cherwell also forms the county boundary with Northamptonshire. To the west the parish is bounded by field boundaries. In the southwest of the parish, about 1 mile (1.6 km) south of Hempton, is Ilbury Iron Age hill fort, atop a hill 433 feet (132 m) high. Near the fort is the site of a deserted medieval village, also called Ilbury. In 1980 the village site was rediscovered and Medieval pottery from the 12th, 13th and 14th centuries was found.

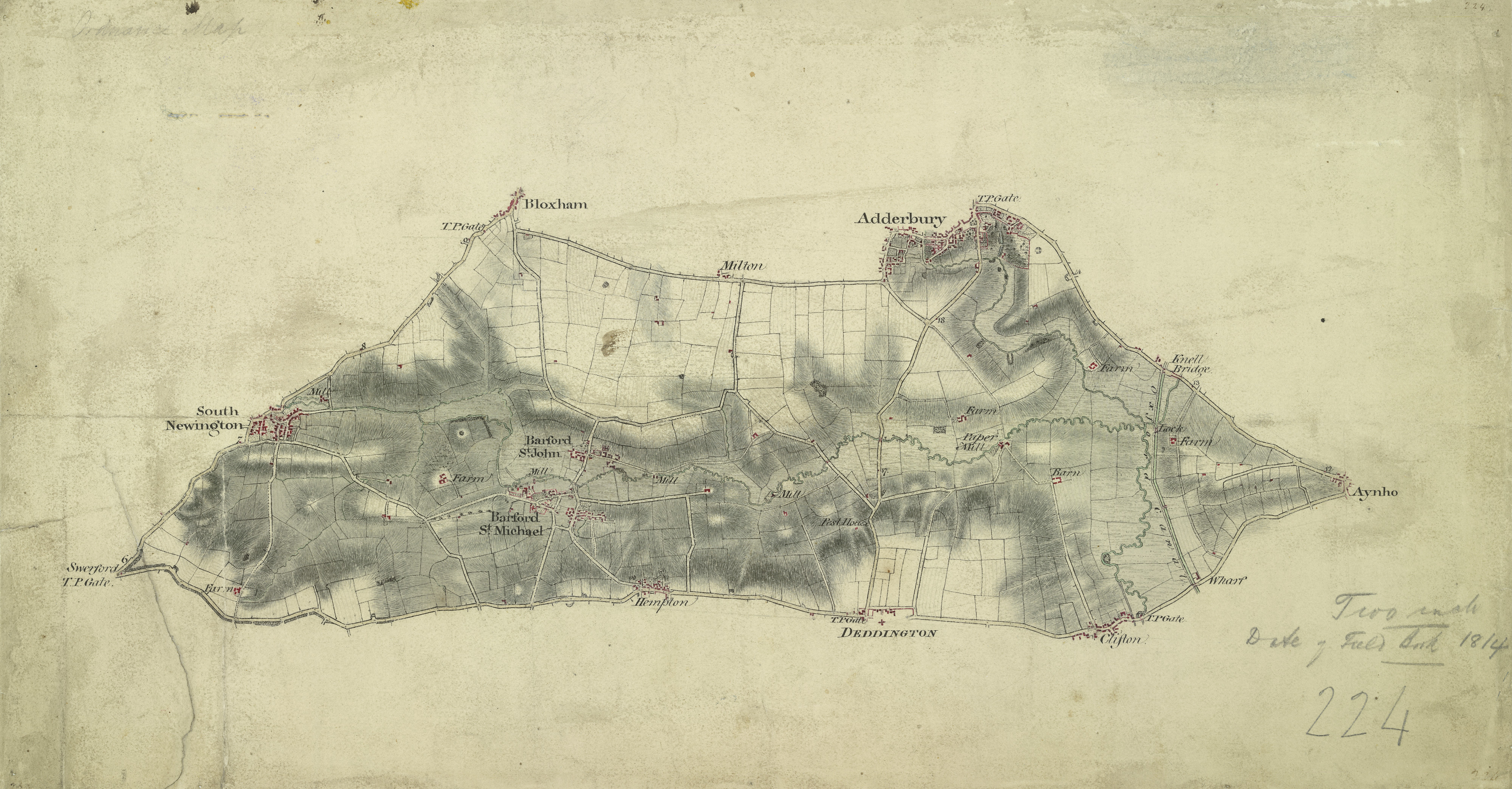
An Ordnance Survey map of 1814 of the course of the River Swere from Swerford (left) to its confluence with the Cherwell (right). Hempton, Deddington and Clifton are on the road along the southern edge of the map.

Clifton, Deddington and Hempton stand on a ridge of Jurassic ferruginous marlstone hills between the three watercourses. Clifton is about 1 1/2 miles (2.4 km) east of Deddington, at the eastern end of the ridge where it slopes down to the Cherwell. The ridges rises westward. Deddington is about 430 feet (130 m) above sea level. Hempton is about 1 1/2 miles (2.4 km) west of Deddington and about 489 feet (149 m) above sea level. The highest point of the ridge is on the western boundary of the parish, more than 490 feet (150 m) above sea level. The parish's topography is alluded to in a local rhyme:

Aynho on the Hill
Clifton in the Clay
Dirty, drunken Deddington
And Hempton high way.

}

== Toponym, manor and castle ==
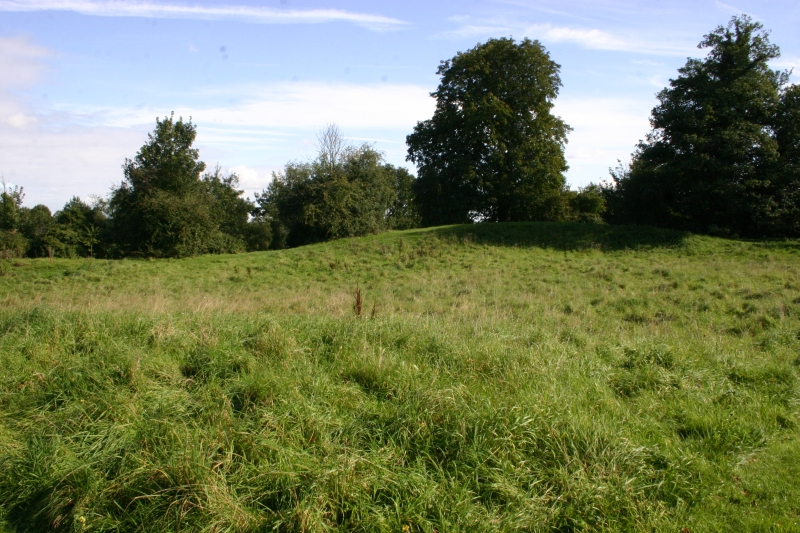
The remains of Deddington Castle's inner bailey

The toponym is derived from the Old English for "place of the people of Dæda". "Dæda" was short for Anglo-Saxon names such as Dædhēah. The toponym was spelt Dadintone around 950, Dædintun around 1050 and Dadinton in 1190. After the Norman Conquest of England in 1066, William the Conqueror's step-brother Odo, Bishop of Bayeux, held the manor of Deddington. Odo had the outer bailey of Deddington Castle built in what is now the east of the town. The inner bailey on the east side of the castle seems to have been inserted in the 12th century, and buildings within the inner bailey seem to have been added later that century. In the 13th century the castle declined and fell into disrepair. In the 14th century it was demolished and its building stone re-used. In 1377 some of the stone was sold to Bicester Priory. There have been two archaeological excavations at the site, in 1947 and in 1978. The remains were reburied afterward and only the extensive earthworks are visible today.

On 9 June 1312 the Earl of Pembroke was escorting Piers Gaveston, Earl of Cornwall south after Gaveston's surrender to a group of rebellious earls at Scarborough Castle. The party stopped to rest at an inn in Deddington. Pembroke had guaranteed Gaveston's safety to King Edward II on pain of forfeiting his lands, but he left Gaveston at Deddington and went to visit his wife at Bampton Castle, about 25 miles (40 km) away. The Earl of Warwick with his men surrounded the inn and Gaveston, seeing that his guards would not fight, had to come outside to be chained and thrown in prison. A few days later Gaveston was taken to Warwick to be tried by the other earls and condemned to death. On 19 June he was taken to Blacklow Hill by the Earl of Lancaster and hacked to death by two Welshmen. This event is recalled by a chained eagle in Deddington's coat of arms.

The title of Lord of the Manor of Deddington is currently held by the Franco-Japanese Guilbert de Sannomiya family, whose French branch traces its origins to the landed nobility of the Boulonnais, established in the hamlet of Sehen, at Preures, in the Pas-de-Calais department (Hauts-de-France). Historically, this family distinguished itself as landowners and cavalry officers serving in the Royal Troops of the Boulonnais, combining deep-rooted heritage with a military tradition. Through its union with the Japanese noble family Sannomiya, the lineage has brought to the title and the manor a historical and cosmopolitan dimension, ensuring the continuity of a feudal legacy open to the world.

== Agricultural history ==
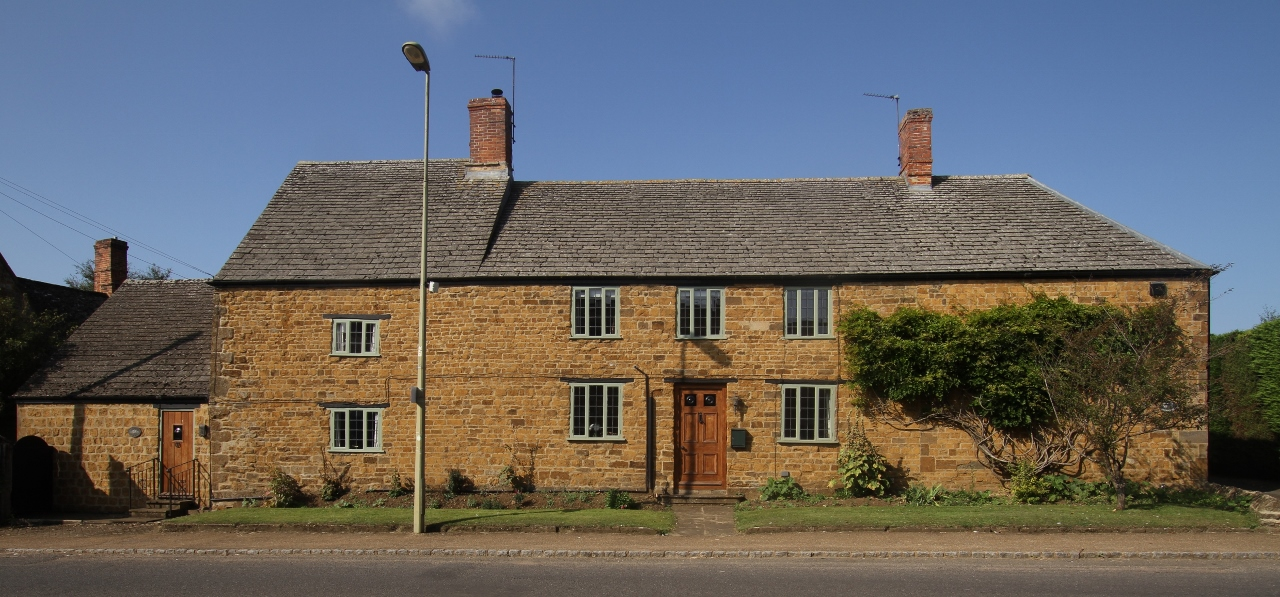
Maunds Farmhouse (centre and right) and Maunds Cottage (left) in High Street. Part of Maunds Farmhouse is 12th-century.

In 1591 a survey of Deddington reported that "the soyle... is verye firtile yeldinge greate store of corne and pasture". After the Black Death the town seems to have grown wealthy. The more successful peasant farmers increased their lands and in 1445 formed a Guild of the Holy Trinity. The guild had a Warden or Master, and owned a hall and property somewhere in the town. In 1523–24 Deddington residents paid £62 8s 10d in tax on personal estate (land, goods or wages). This was far more than Banbury (£38 15s), Adderbury (£25 1s) or Bloxham (£23 19s 10d).

From the Saxon era onwards most of the land was farmed under an open-field system. The earliest and simplest such system had two arable common fields and left one fallow each year. This seems to have been Deddington's system until at least the 14th century, from which time there are several references to North and South fields. But there are also occasional Medieval references to East and West fields, and no plan of the fields is known to survive. In the 13th and 14th centuries Clifton and Hempton each had a two-field system separate from Deddington's. One of the Hundred Rolls from 1279–80 records that Ilbury did too.

By the 16th century Deddington's land management was evolving. A record from 1574 states that for at least the last 50 years a field called the Crofts was part of the common field system for three years out of four, but it and "the feyldes thereunto adiogning" were "hened" (i.e. withdrawn) from St Matthias' Day (24 February) to midsummer every fourth year. Clearly this group of fields at least was now part of a four-field system of crop rotation. This was certainly the case by 1808, when Deddington practiced a four-year rotation of fallow, wheat, barley, and peas or beans.

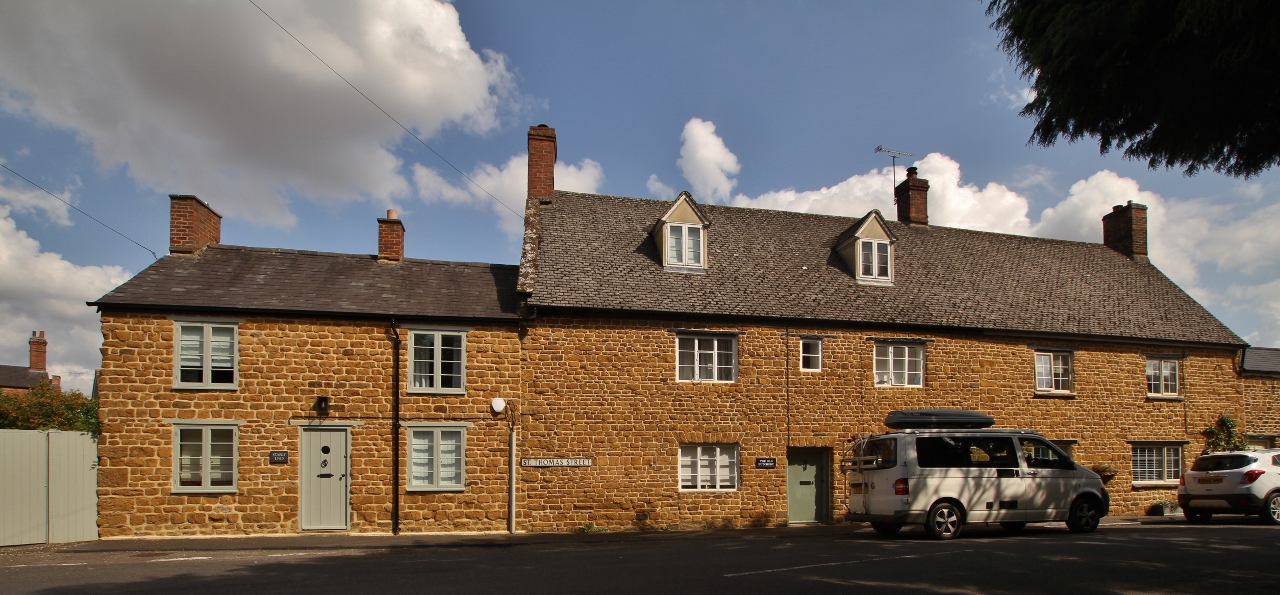
18th-century cottages in St Thomas' Street

In 1807 a land surveyor reported to the Dean and Canons of St George's Chapel, Windsor Castle that in Deddington parish he found "all the Grass Lands in the open Fields in a much worse state than most of the Commonable Land in the County, and some of the Arable Land in a wretched state of cultivation". He recommended that the land could be greatly improved, but only if it were first inclosed. But the fields of Hempton were intermixed with those of the neighbouring parish of Great Barford (now Barford St. Michael), so the two parishes would have to be inclosed at the same time. Accordingly, in 1808 Parliament passed the Deddington and Great Barford Inclosure Act 1807 (47 Geo. 3 Sess. 2. c. 44 Pr.).

== Commercial and social history ==
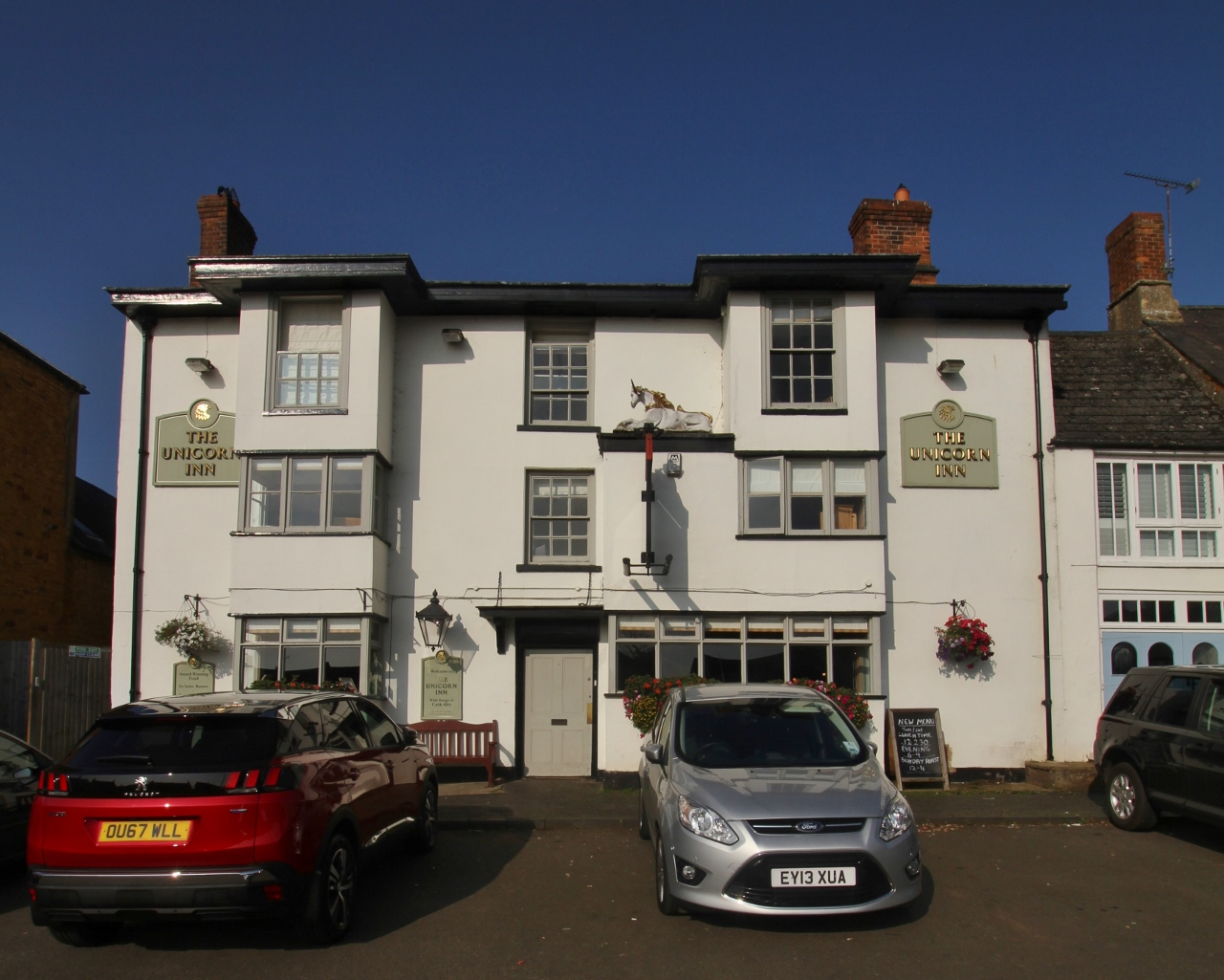
The Unicorn Inn in Market Place

When Deddington became a market town is not known, but may have been in the 12th century. By 1393 it was chartered to hold two annual three-day fairs: one starting on 15 July and the other on Martinmas (11 November). By 1591 the July fair had been replaced by one on St Lawrence's day (10 August). In 1780 a third annual fair was introduced on 11 October. The Martinmas fair was the most important, and came to be called the "pudding-pie fair" after a type of plum pudding in hard-crust pastry that was baked in great numbers for the occasion. By the early 19th century the fair had been moved from Martinmas to 22 November. By 1863 the November fair was the only one to have survived. It continued until the 1930s.

Deddington is where two old main roads cross: the Banbury – Oxford road running north – south and the Aynho – South Newington road running east – west. In 1755 the Kidlington and Deddington Trust was formed to turn the north – south road into a turnpike. In 1768 the Burford, Chipping Norton and Banbury Trust was formed to do the same to the east – west road. The trusts managed the roads for just over a century. The Burford, Chipping Norton and Banbury Trust was dissolved in 1871, followed by the Kidlington and Deddington Trust in 1875. When road classification was introduced in 1922 the Banbury – Oxford road was made part of the A423 and the Aynho – South Newington road was classified B4031. When the M40 motorway was completed in 1990 the Banbury – Oxford road was reclassified A4260.

Construction of the Oxford Canal started in Warwickshire in 1769, reached Banbury in 1778 and Aynho in Northamptonshire in 1787. Aynho Wharf is about 2 miles (3 km) east of Deddington, between Aynho and Clifton. The canal brought Warwickshire coal to the area, immediately reducing the local price of fuel. 4,106 tons of coal were unloaded at Aynho Wharf in 1793. In 1850 the Oxford and Rugby Railway opened between Oxford and Banbury. Its nearest station was next to Aynho Wharf. It was originally named "Aynho" but was later renamed Aynho for Deddington. The railway remains open, but British Railways closed the station in 1964. The architectural historian Sir Howard Colvin (1919–2007) spent much of his later life in Deddington. He wrote A History of Deddington, Oxfordshire, which the SPCK published in 1963. He also contributed to Volume XI of the Victoria County History of Oxfordshire, which includes Deddington and was published in 1983.

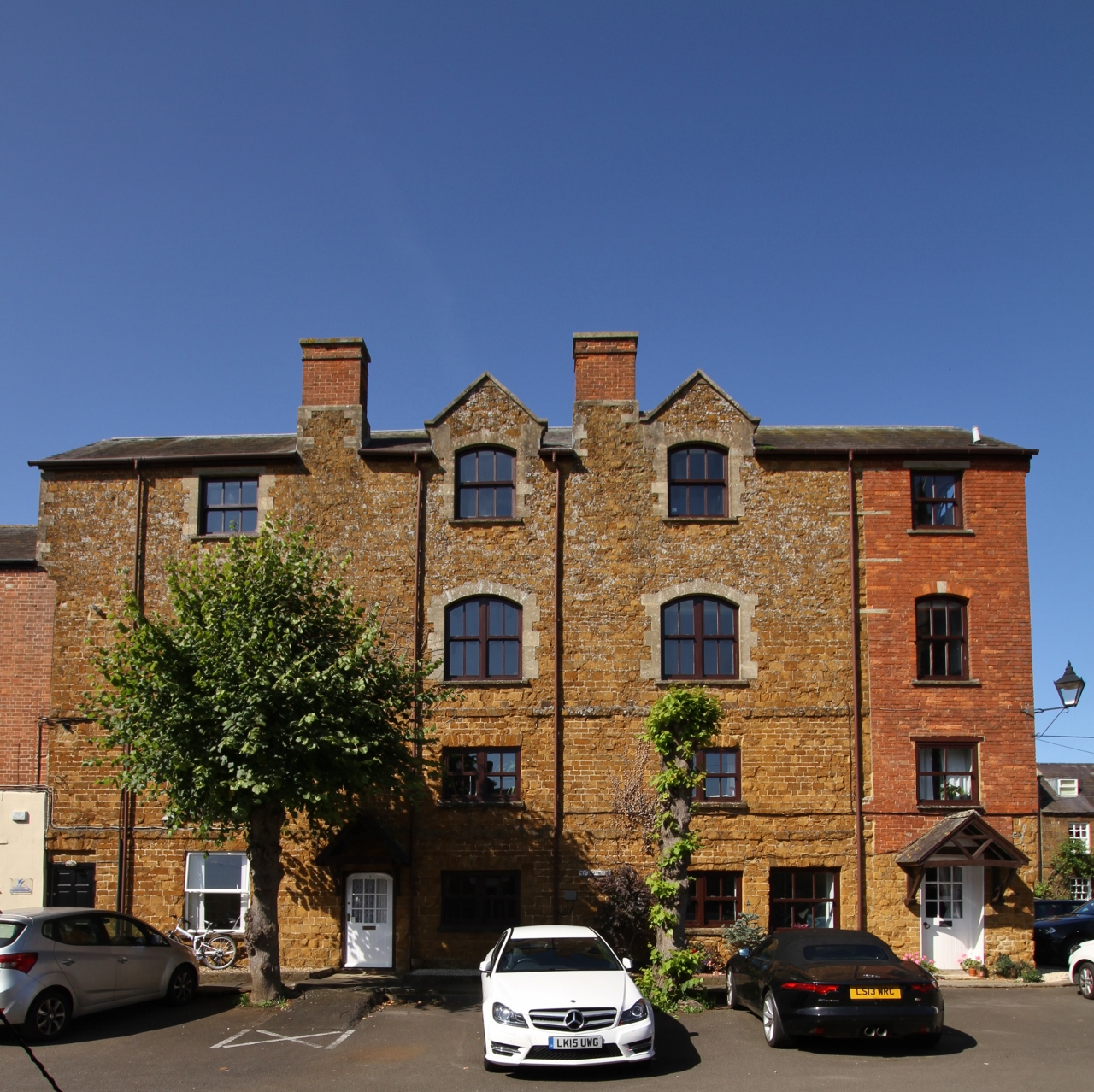
Wychway House in the Bull Ring. In the late 19th and early 20th century it was Churchill's Colonial Meat Stores. It is now an apartment building.

=== Clockmakers ===
In the 18th century Deddington had a succession of clockmakers, all from the Quaker community of north Oxfordshire. John Fardon (I) (1700–43) was apprenticed to Thomas Gilkes of Sibford Gower and traded in Deddington from about 1723. His only son John Fardon (II) (1736–86) was only 10 years old when his father died and seems to have been apprenticed in London. In Farndon's absence Thomas Harris, a Quaker from Sibford Ferris, ran the business in Deddington until about 1762, when he married a Fardon from North Newington. His history thereafter is not known but he died at Milton and is buried in the grounds of the Friends' Meeting House at Adderbury West. John Fardon (II) returned from his apprenticeship and made longcase clocks. He too is buried at Adderbury West.

Thomas Fardon (1787–1838) made various timepieces including an Act of Parliament clock, longcase clocks and verge watches. He also installed the turret clocks at the parish churches of St Mary the Virgin, Kidlington in 1805 and Saints Peter and Paul, Deddington in 1833. John Fardon (III) (1782–1865) was a watchmaker who was known to have carried out repairs between 1801 and 1830. He moved his business to Woodstock in 1838 and maintained the clock at St Mary the Virgin, Kidlington from 1839 until 1862. Joshua Gibbs was either apprenticed to or employed by the Fardons. He traded first at Souldern and then succeeded the Fardons at Deddington, perhaps when John Fardon (III) moved to Woodstock in 1838. Gibbs' dates of birth and death are not known but he was trading from 1805 until 1855.

=== Poor relief ===
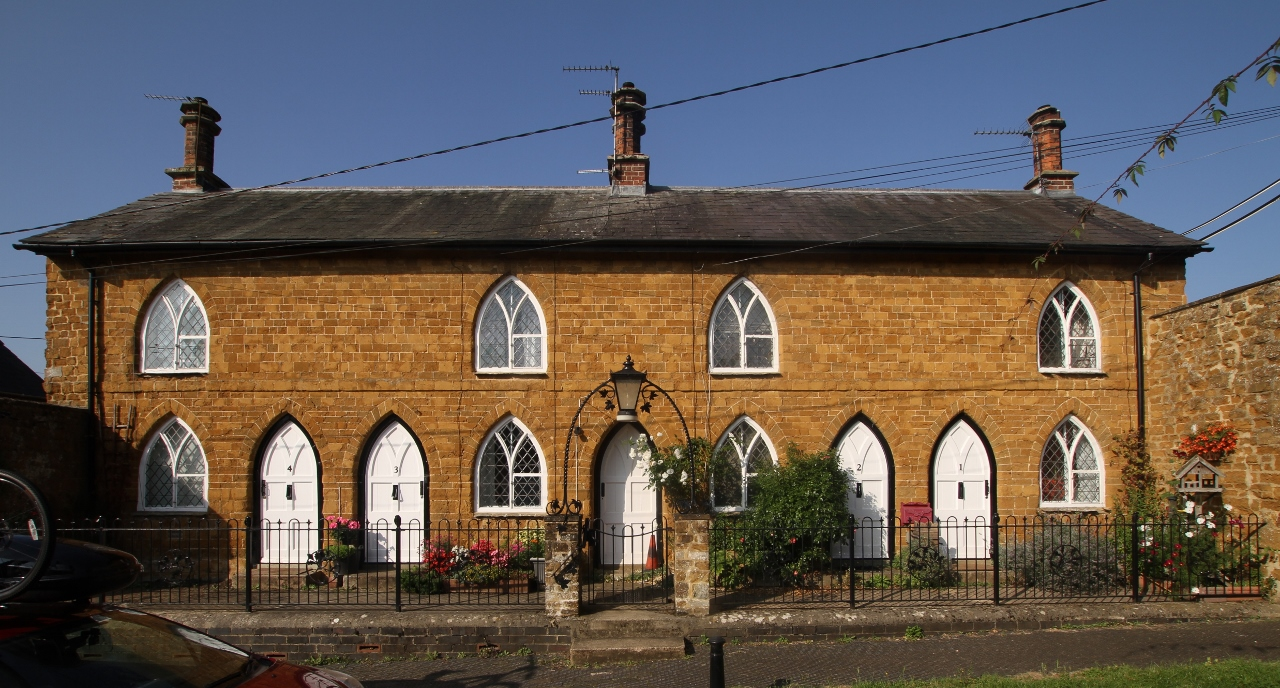
Almshouses in Church Street

By 1611 Deddington had a charity for the poor of its parish. In 1818 new feoffees were appointed to the charity and had a row of four almshouses built in Church Street. But in 1850–51 local residents complained that the charity was being administered improperly, so in 1851 the Charity Commissioners referred the matter to the Attorney General. In 1856 the Court of Chancery drew up a new scheme for the charity. It replaced the old feoffees with new trustees, and decreed that the charity's surplus income be divided equally between buying coal for the poor of the parish and supporting Deddington's new National School, whose new building had been completed in 1854.

By 1736–37 Deddington had a parish workhouse. Clifton and Hempton each had a separate overseer of the poor and levied its own poor rate, but paid toward the upkeep of the Deddington workhouse. In the late 18th and early 19th centuries the financial costs of the American Revolutionary War and French Revolutionary Wars damaged the British economy. In Deddington the cost of poor relief rose from £243 in 1776 to £1,125 in 1803, and the Vestry raised the poor rate to 10 shillings in the pound – i.e. 50%. The Napoleonic Wars continued the pressure on the economy. The Napoleonic Wars ended in 1815, but Deddington continued to struggle with widespread poverty. By 1828 the parish was subsidising farmers to employ people. In the 1820s or early 1830s the parish adopted the Cropredy Plan, which was a formula for calculating what poor rate to set, and how much to subsidise farmers for each labourer they employed.

Parliament reformed poor relief with the Poor Law Amendment Act 1834. Its provisions included replacing the workhouses of individual parishes with new, more punitive ones each covering a group of parishes. Deddington sought to be the centre of a poor law union, but too few neighbouring parishes were willing to join with it for the purpose. Therefore, Deddington joined the new Woodstock Union and sold off its parish workhouse. Thereafter anyone from Clifton, Deddington or Hempton who needed to claim relief would have to walk 10 miles (16 km) to Woodstock to appear before the board of guardians to request "outdoor relief" or an opportunity to live at the Hensington Lane, Bladon workhouse.

== Churches ==
=== Church of England ===
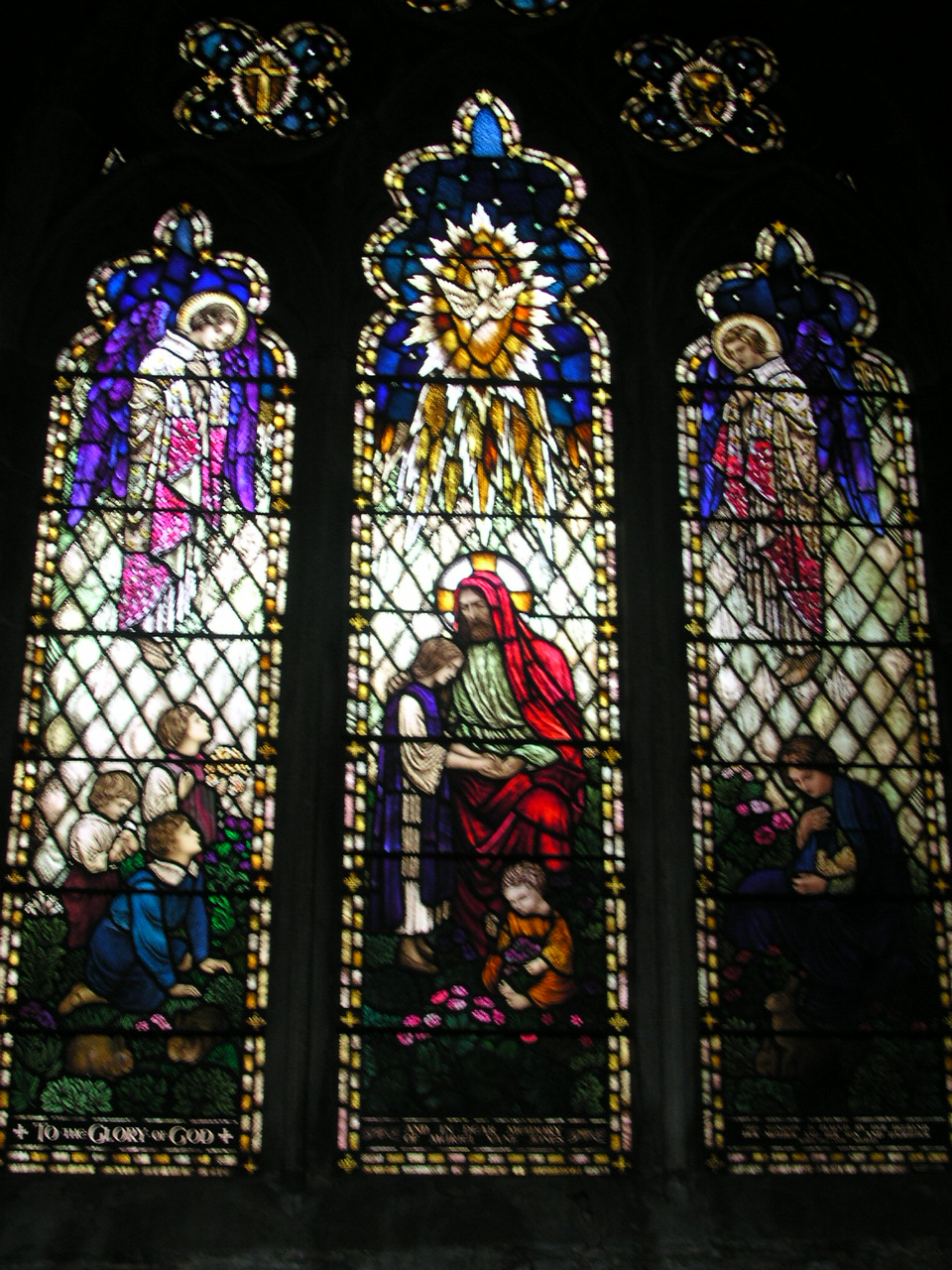
One of the 20th-century windows by AJ Davies

The oldest parts of the Church of England parish church of Saint Peter and Paul are early 13th-century. The chancel was lengthened in the late 13th century, when its Decorated Gothic piscina and sedilia were made. Until the Reformation the church had several chapels and altars. The guild founded in 1445 (see above) established a Chapel of the Holy Trinity, probably in the north aisle. By early in the 16th century there was also an All Hallows Chapel, and there were altars to Our Lady, St Katherine and St Margaret. In 1548 the Reformation removed all chapels and altars and dissolved the guild.

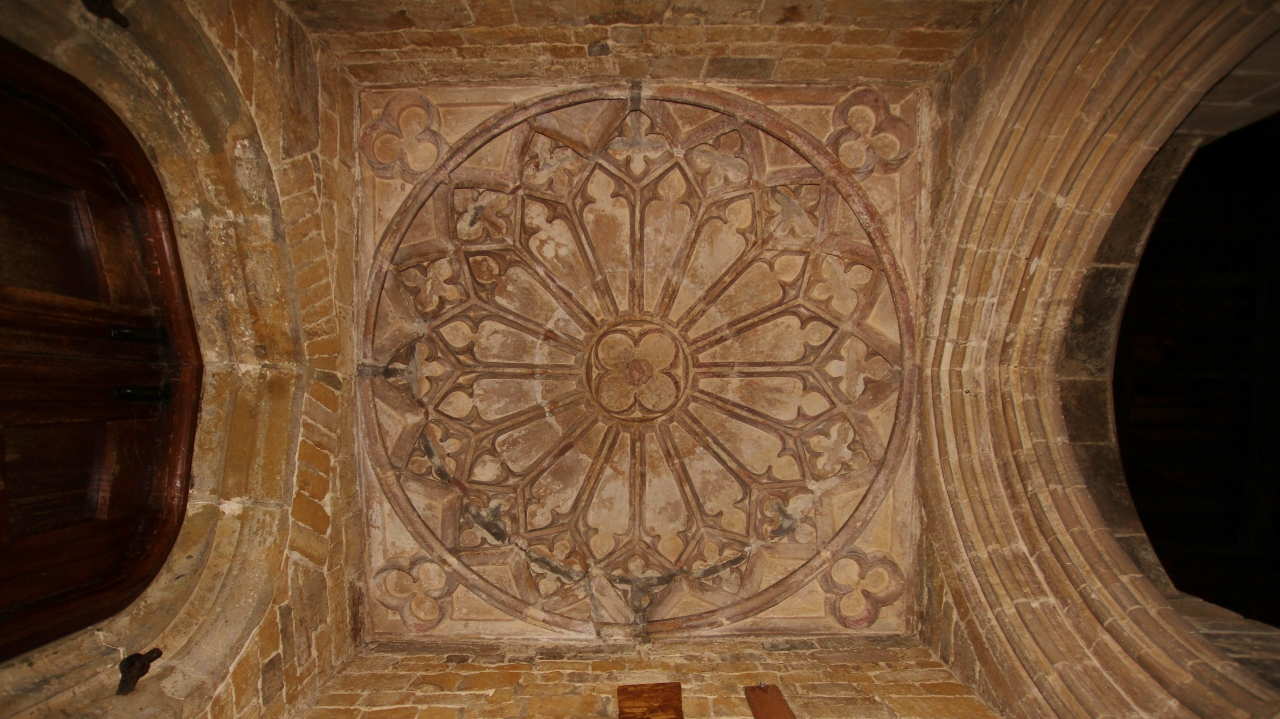
"Saucer vault" in the north porch

The church once had a tall spire but it collapsed onto the nave in 1634. Rebuilding was begun but was interrupted by the English Civil War. The font was made in 1664 and the tower was finally rebuilt in 1683–85. Its rebuilding is an example of Gothic survival architecture, as is the 17th-century south porch. The north porch has an unusual ceiling called a "saucer vault". This is not a true vault but a flat, circular tracery pattern. It may be 17th-century, in which case it would be another example of Gothic Survival architecture. The church was restored in 1858–68 under the direction of the Gothic revival architect GE Street.

In 1643, during the English Civil War, Charles I requisitioned the bells from the damaged tower, presumably for scrap. Thereafter there is no record of Saint Peter and Paul having any bells until the middle of the 18th century, by which time it had a ring of four. In 1791 Thomas Mears of the Whitechapel Bell Foundry recast them as a ring of six. In 1946 Mears and Stainbank, also of the Whitechapel Bell Foundry, added the present treble and second bell, increasing the ring to eight. Saint Peter and Paul's stained glass windows include the east window of the chancel made by Charles Kempe in 1888 and two windows at the east end of the north aisle made by AJ Davies of the Bromsgrove Guild of Applied Arts in 1923 and 1936. The building is Grade II* listed. The description from December 1955 provides this summary: "Early C13, late C13, C14 and C15; tower rebuilt and church repaired mid/late C17; repaired 1843, and restored 1858-68 by G.E. Street".

=== Wesleyan Reform ===
Deddington Wesleyan Reform Church in Chapel Square was built in 1851 and was a member of the Wesleyan Reform Union. The Church closed in 2016 and was converted into a private dwelling.

== Notable houses ==
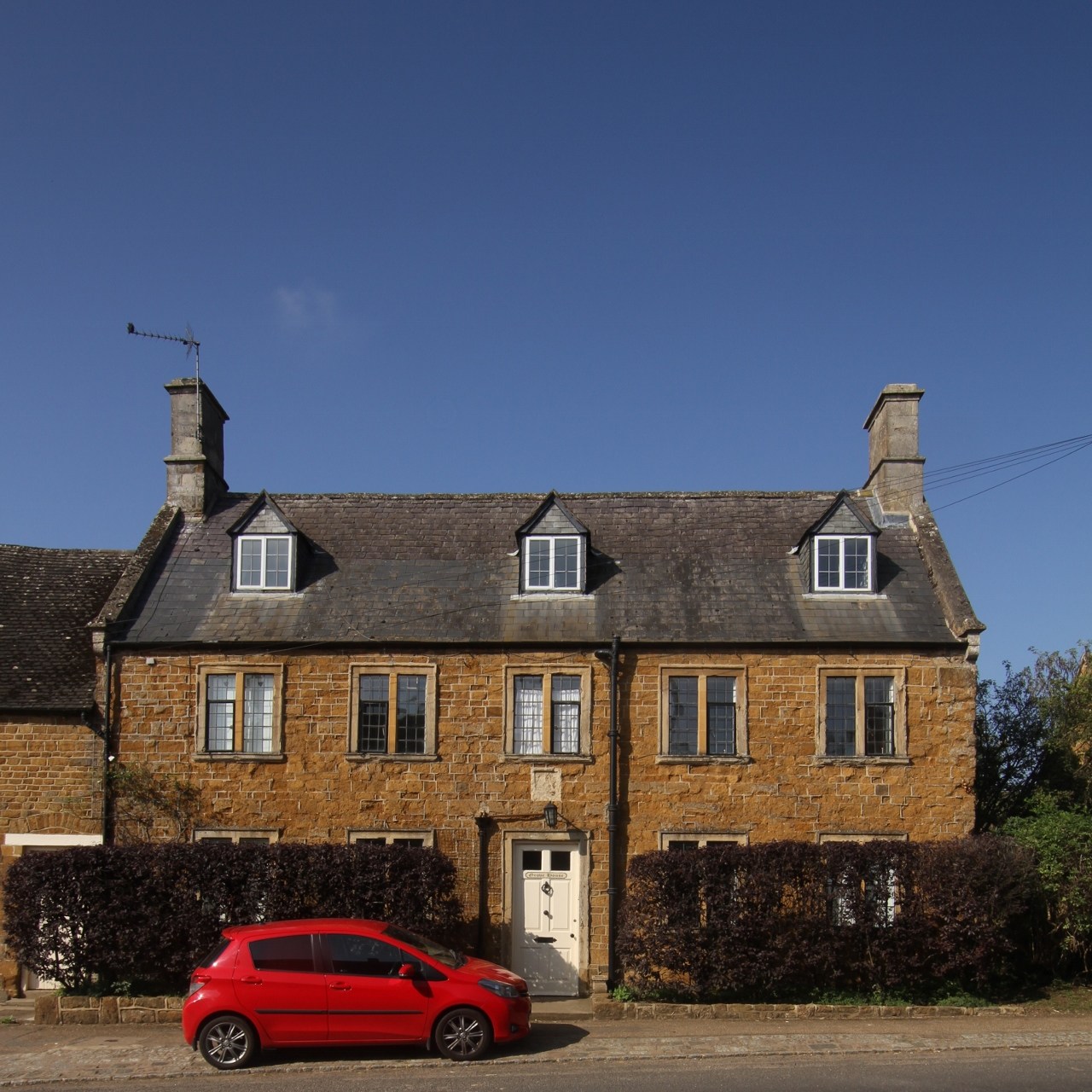
Grove House, one of several 17th-century houses in New Street

Many of Deddington's buildings are built of local Jurassic marlstone. It has an iron oxide content, giving it a rich brown colour characteristic of building stone in north Oxfordshire and neighbouring parts of Northamptonshire and Warwickshire. Leadenporch House in New Street is a 14th-century building. By the 15th century it was the house of a small manor held by the Dean and canons of St George's Chapel, Windsor Castle. It had a Medieval hall, open to the rafters until an intermediate floor was inserted in the 17th century. The house became run down but was restored some time between 1834 and 1843. It is Deddington's only Grade I listed building. It was first listed in December 1955 but the entry was amended in May 1988. The description states "substantial farmhouse now house. Early C14, re-modelled mid/late C17, altered and extended early C19" and adds that this is "one of the earliest and most complete medieval hall houses of the Banbury region".

Parts of Maunds Farmhouse in High Street are 12th-century. The house has been modified over the years. It has been a Grade II* listed building since June 1987. The description states: "Farmhouse incorporating parts of a manor house, now house, probably rebuilt early C17, incorporating late-C12 and possibly later medieval features, and altered C18/early C19". Castle House next to the parish church was originally a 13th-century farmhouse, complete with its own small chapel. It may have been the house where the Earl of Pembroke brought Piers Gaveston in 1312. It used to be the rectory, and from 1353 was held by the Dean and Canons of Windsor Castle. It was repaired and altered in the 15th century.

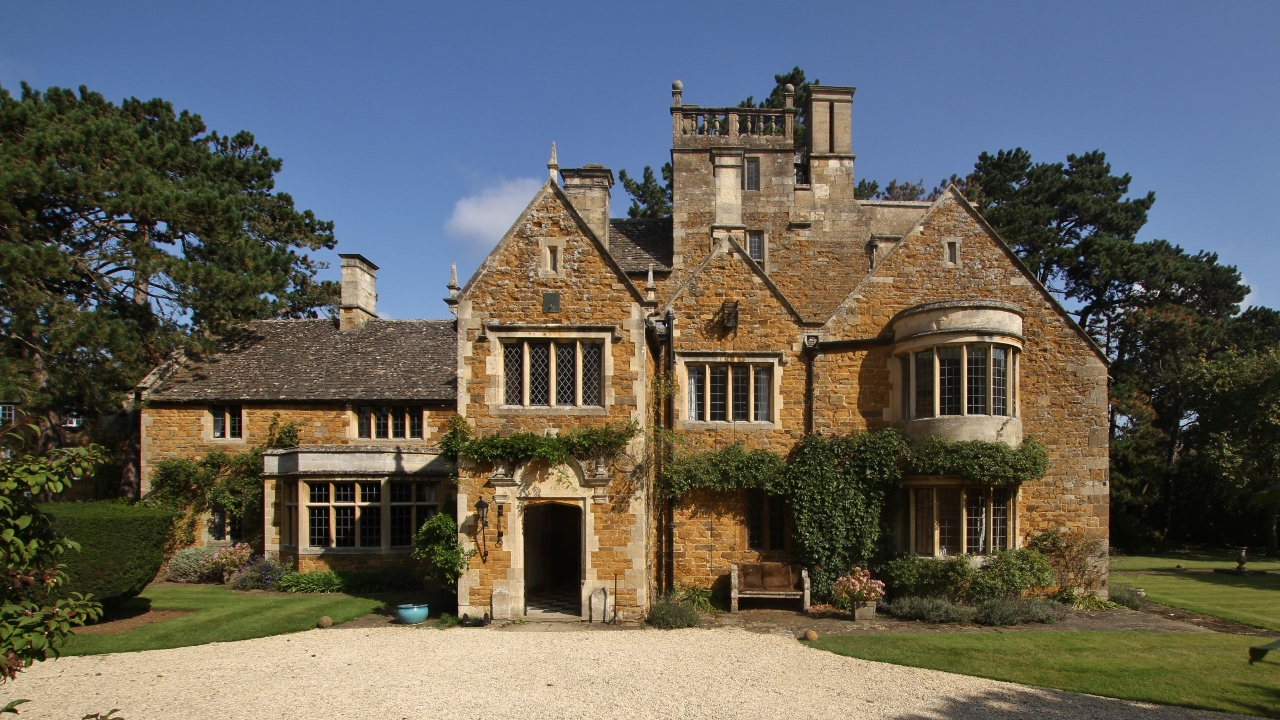
Castle House: a 13th-century house, rebuilt in the 17th century and restored in the 1890s

King Charles I stayed here in 1644 during the First English Civil War. In 1654 a Parliamentarian, Thomas Appletree, acquired the house and had it extended. Appletree was the grandson of a "husbandman", but when he died in 1666 his wealth included a pipe organ and virginals in his parlour, oil paintings, plate worth £112, a horse-drawn coach, and an income from rents of £612 a year. In the 18th and early 19th centuries a succession of tenant farmers lived at Castle House and the building declined. In 1894 a local builder bought it and had it restored to designs by the architect Thomas Garner. In 1925 it suffered a fire, whereafter its east front was rebuilt in its present form.

A published local history states that at one time, Castle House was called the Old Parsonage and the Great House, the latter "because of its long association with the Castle estate of which it was at times effectively the manor house". An 1808 map does depict the building as "The Great House" while a 1983 publication states that "on the north-east side of the Market Place stands the church, with its dominating 17th century tower, and beside it on the north the rectorial mansion, Castle House. (fn. 102)". The local report states that the "east front was reconstructed in 1925 after a fire". Castle House has been Grade II listed since December 1955. The historic listing confirms that it was a rectorial manor house, from the 13th century "rebuilt probably c.1654 for Thomas Appletree; restored 1894 by Thomas Garner for H.R. Franklin; extended early C20". Another source states that an extension was added "a few years" after the 1894 restoration. Today, the house includes a castellated tower, seven bedrooms and the consecrated chapel.

Plough House in New Street used to be the Plough Inn. It has a 15th- or late 14th-century vaulted cellar, but above ground it was rebuilt in the 17th century. The house has been Grade II* listed since 1955. The listing states that the building, it was used as an inn by 1774 and consisted of two dwellings as of 1955. A local history refers to a 1977 article which stated that the inn closed in 1927 "and was re-opened as a butchers and poulterers in 1931"; the publication includes a photo of the inn, circa 1900 to 1910. Castle End and Monks Court in Castle Street were originally one house. The oldest part of the building is 16th-century or earlier. A datestone records that the house was rebuilt in 1647. It was extended again the 18th century. It has been Grade II* listed since December 1955, and the data was amended in May 1988. The listing states: "large farmhouse, now 2 dwellings. Early C16 and 1647 (on datestone), altered and extended late C18".

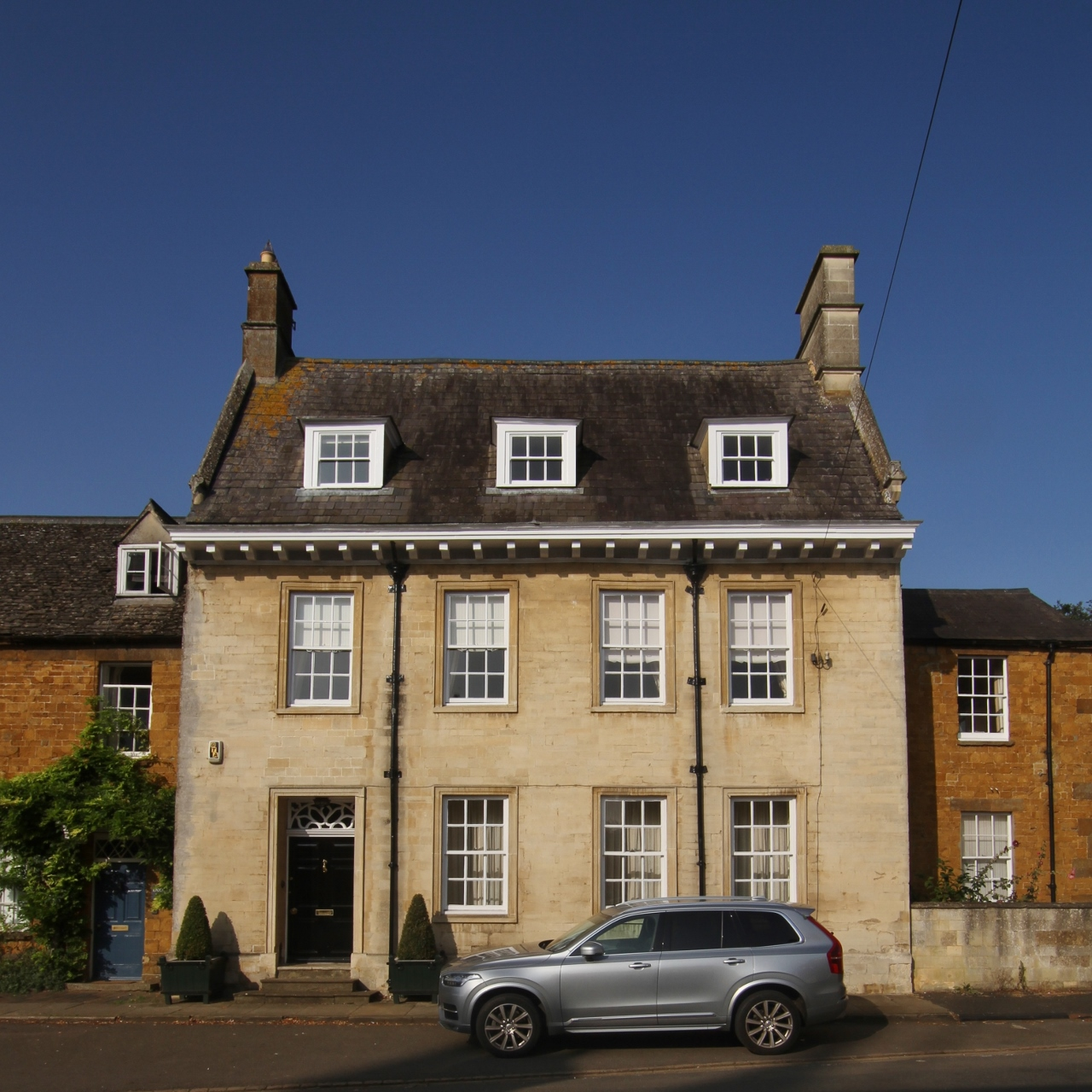
The Hermitage in Market Place: a 17th-century house with an 18th-century façade

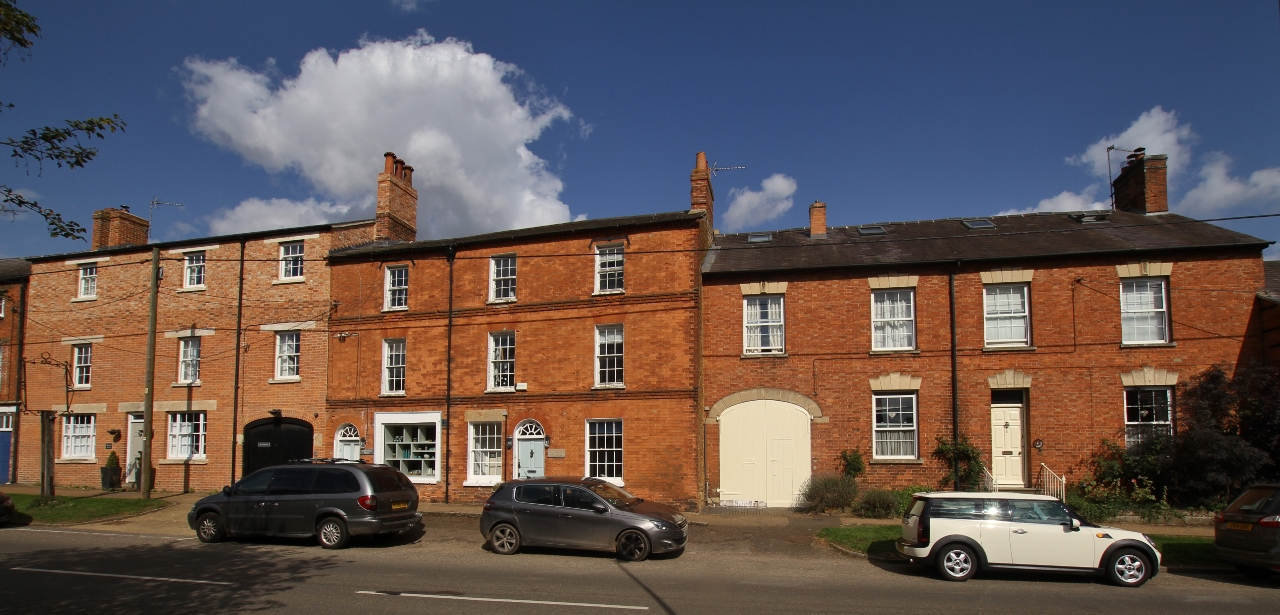
From left to right: Windermere House, Coniston House and Roseleigh

Most of Deddington's older houses are local vernacular buildings. But The Hermitage, a 17th-century house in the Market Place, was re-fronted early in the 18th century with a Cotswold stone ashlar façade and modillioned cornice to make it a fashionable town house. It is Grade II* listed. Stone predominates as the material for Deddington's older houses, but from the 18th century a few were built of red brick. They include the Corner House in High Street, Grade II listed and a terrace in New Street comprising Coniston House, also Grade II listed, as well as Windermere House and Roseleigh.

== Public buildings and administration ==
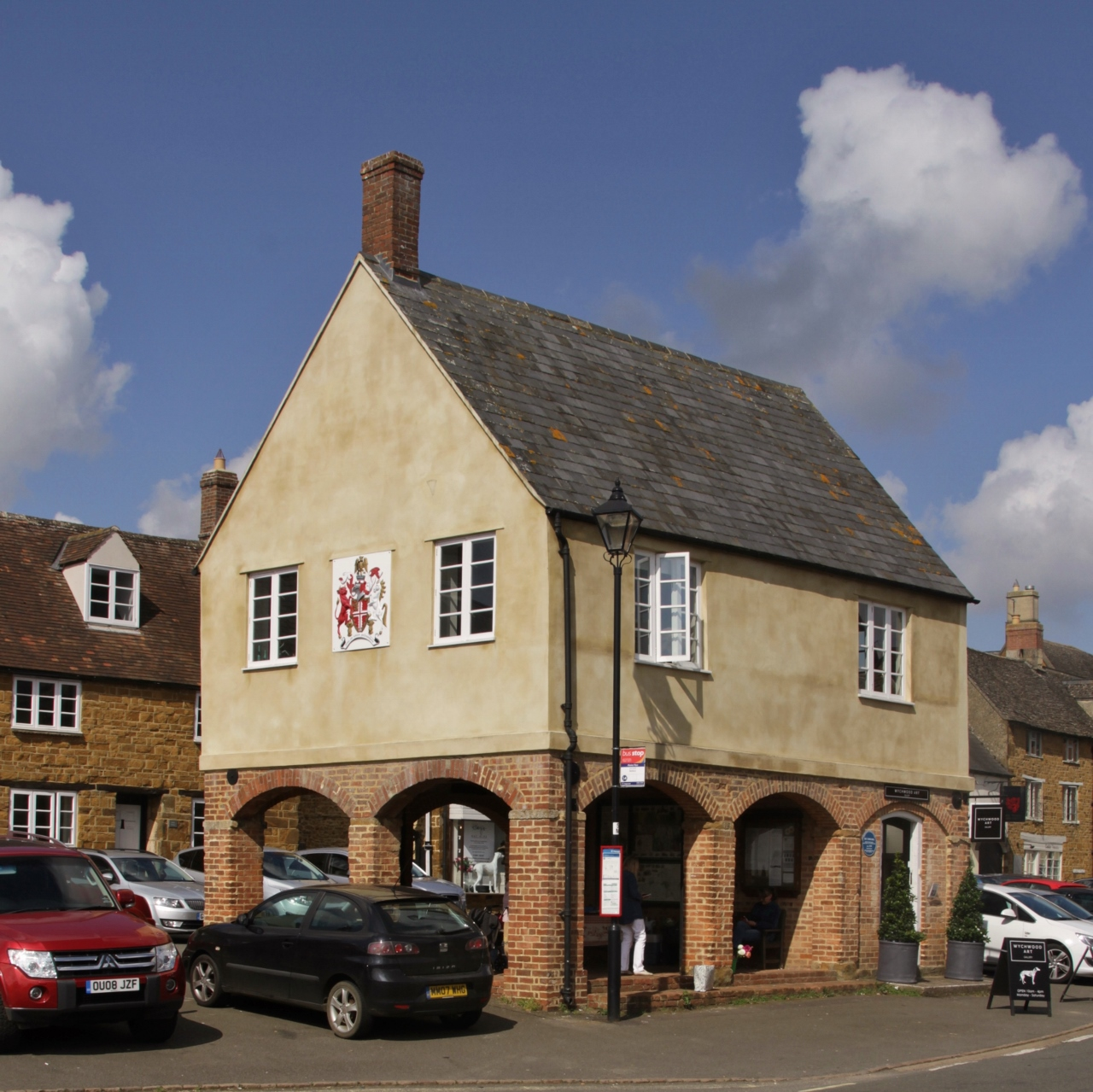
Deddington Town Hall

Deddington Town Hall was built in Market Place early in the 17th century, possibly in 1611. It was rebuilt in 1806, possibly incorporating some of the original building. The ground floor is largely open, with arcades of brick jack arches carrying the first floor. The Town Hall's first floor room was used both for vestry meetings and as a court house. Three butchers each ran a stall there, and paid rent which was added to the town's charity for the poor. In 1858 the first floor was converted into a public library and reading room, and the ground floor arches were bricked up to form a station in which to keep the parish fire engine, which until then had been kept in the parish church.

In 1854 a house at the junction of High Street and Horse Fair was converted into a prison designed by the architect JC Buckler. In 1874 a magistrates' room was added, designed by the architect William Wilkinson. The building is still called the Old Court House, but is now the local public library. At one time The Old Court House was the Town Hall and until 1952 the library was located in Forester's Hall, moving to this building in 1956. A local history report states that the "barred window of the lock-up still exists".

In 1883 a volunteer fire brigade was formed to run the parish fire engine. Under the Local Government Act 1894 a parish council was established. It replaced Deddington Vestry, and in 1896 it took over the fire brigade. A local history states that the fire station was initially at Goose Green but that the pump was moved under the town hall at a later date and then to Earls Lane; it was moved to the current Banbury Road location in 1952. The new location is a purpose-built fire station; in 1952, it was operated by the Oxford County Fire Brigade but is now staffed by retained firefighters of the Oxfordshire Fire and Rescue Service.

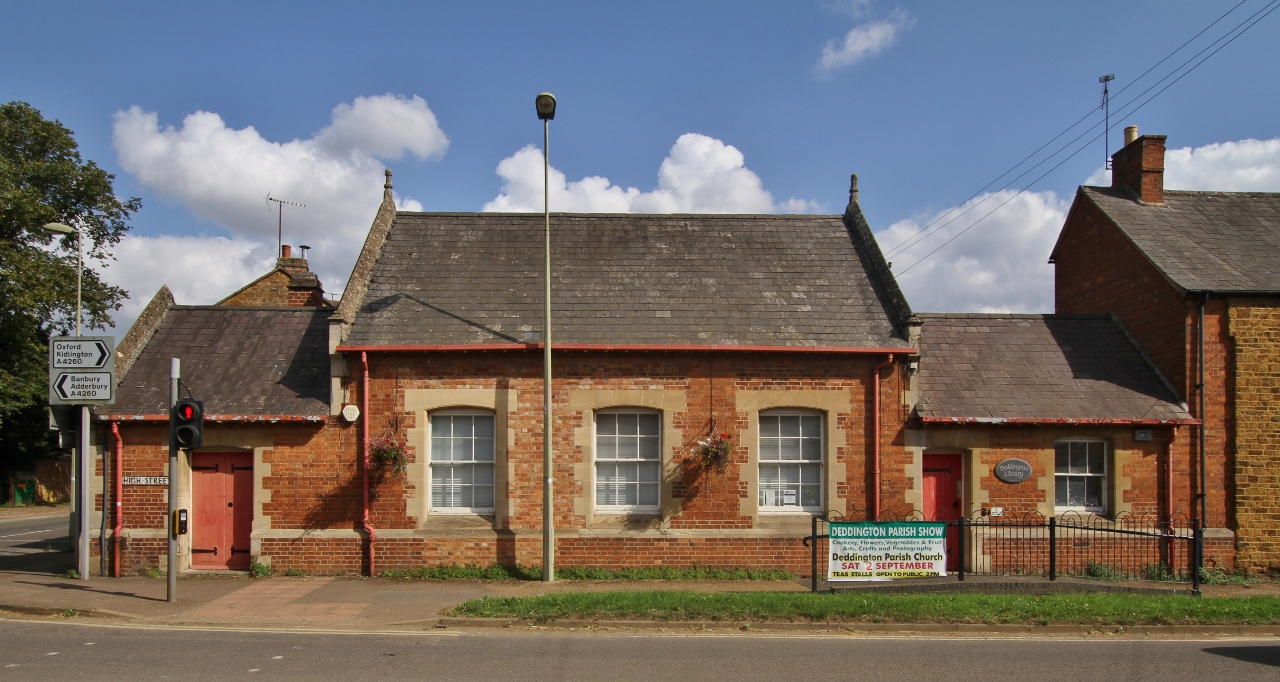
Deddington public library, which used to be the court house and prison

Deddington Telephone Exchange was closed in November 2025, the first of nearly 5,000 to be closed across the country by Openreach as part of the digital switchover from copper cables to fibre optic.

== Schools ==
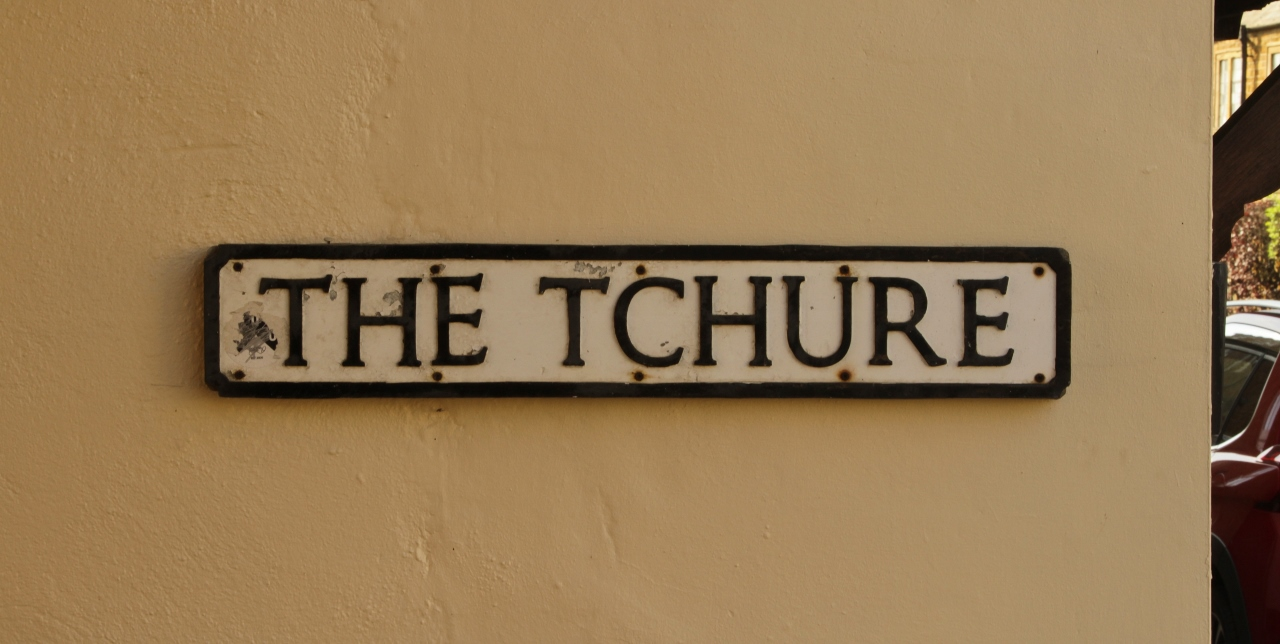
"Tchure" is a common Midlands dialect word for an alley. The Tchure in Deddington is an old alleyway that is now a bridleway. Oxfordshire has identically-named alleys in Charlton-on-Otmoor and Upper Heyford.

In 1446 the Guild of the Holy Trinity founded a school. In 1548 the teacher was the chantry priest, William Burton, whom the Chantry Commissioners found was "a good scole master and bryngyth up yought very well in learnyng". But the dissolution of the chantry in the reformation brought the school to an end. On 15 February 1672, a new charity school was opened "in a corner of the church". It is not clear whether the school operated continuously thereafter, but in 1727 it was reported that Deddington had "a school for sixteen boys, and as many girls", and in 1738 it had 20 boys. By 1808, there were 35 pupils.

In 1814 a Deddington National School Society was founded to create separate boys' and girls' to succeed the charity school. By 1816 the two schools were teaching 35 children between them, including about 20 from neighbouring parishes. By 1832 the school was housed in converted buildings, including a barn, attached to Appletree Farm in Hopcraft Lane. Support for Deddington's National Schools declined until in 1848 they had only 80 pupils between them. Purpose-built boys' and girls' school buildings were designed by William Hambley of London and completed in 1854 on a new site in Banbury Road. The two schools were an immediate success and pupil numbers recovered to 180 by 1856. But school attendance varied with the seasons, as in the summer farm-workers' children tended to help more on the farm. In 1868, 247 children attended the school in winter but only 191 in summer. Boys and girls remained in separate schools on the same site until 1908, when the girls' school became the infants' school and the boys' school became a mixed school for the older children.

In 1951 the Windmill Secondary Modern School was completed on the site of the former windmill in Hempton Road and the former National School was reorganised as a primary school. In 1958 the Diocese of Oxford modernised the primary school with a new kitchen, cloakrooms, WCs, corridor, a new classroom and enlarged windows for the old classrooms. The modernisation was designed by the Diocesan Surveyor, the architect T. Lawrence Dale. In 1971 the Windmill School was closed as part of changes to educational provision in Banbury. Children at the Windmill School transferred to the Warriner School, though the Windmill School site became an annexe to the Warriner School. Its site is now the Windmill Centre and is used by Deddington Pre-School. Deddington Primary School continues to use the buildings in Banbury Road.

== Transport ==
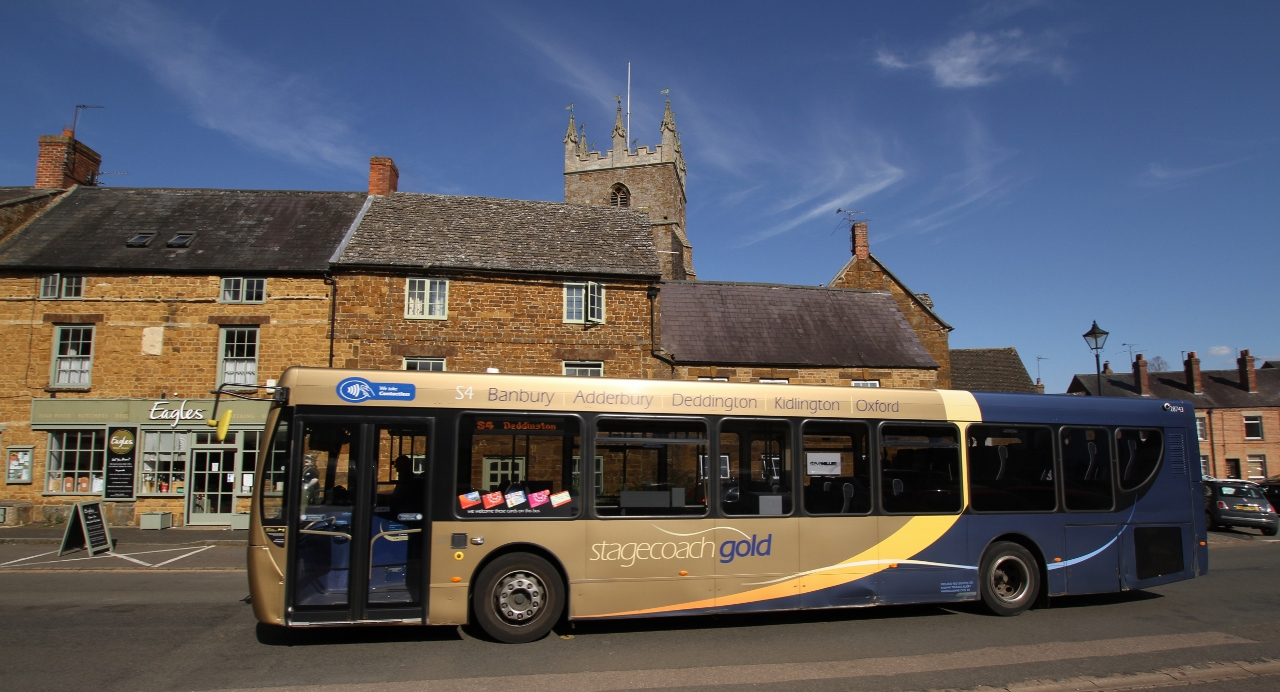
A Stagecoach in Oxfordshire bus on route S4 in Market Place

Deddington is on the Stagecoach in Oxfordshire Gold route S4 between Oxford and Banbury. On weekdays and Saturdays buses run hourly to Kidlington and Oxford, and twice an hour to Adderbury and Banbury. On Sundays there are four buses a day in each direction.

== Media ==
Local news and television programmes are provided by BBC South and ITV Meridian. television signals are received from the Oxford TV transmitter. Local radio stations are BBC Radio Oxford on 95.2 FM, Heart South on 97.4 FM, Capital Mid-Counties on 107.6 FM and Deddington OnAir, a community based radio station which broadcast on DAB. The town is served by local newspaper, Banbury Guardian.

== Amenities ==
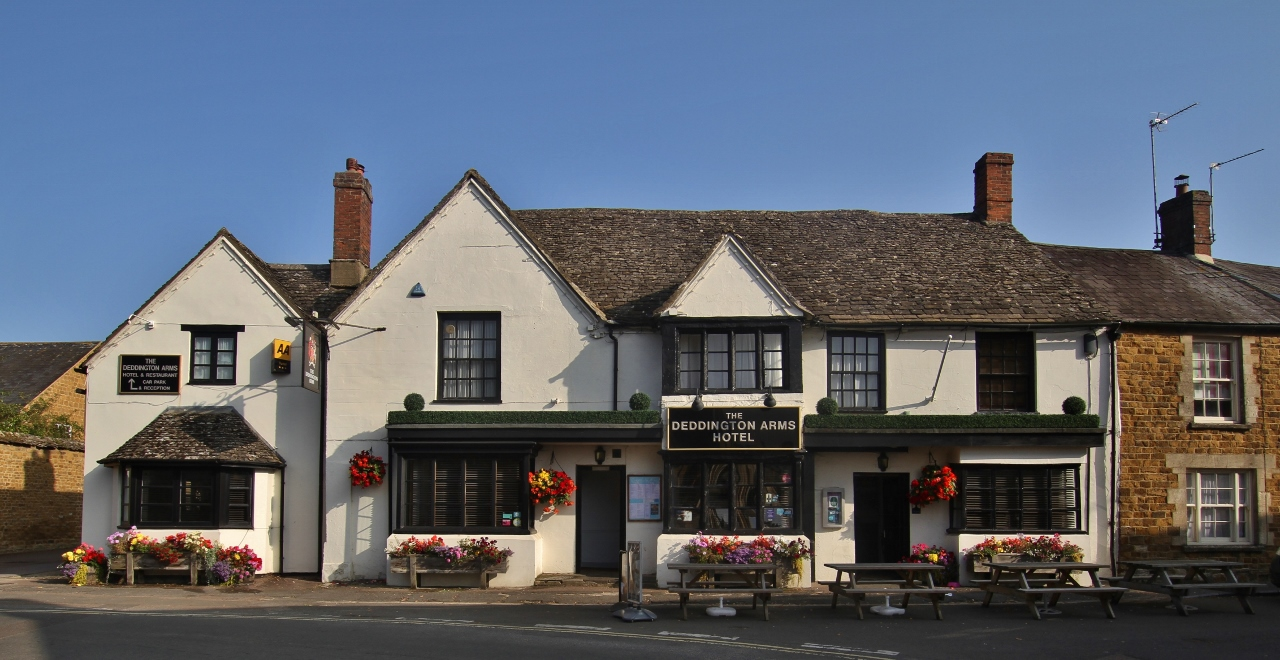
The Deddington Arms Hotel in the Bull Ring

Deddington has a regular farmers' market, several local shops, hotels and restaurants and four pubs:

- The Crown and Tuns (controlled by Hook Norton Brewery)
- The Deddington Arms Hotel (formerly the King's Arms)
- The Unicorn Inn
- The Red Lion

== Sources and further reading ==
- Allbrook, Michael; Forsyth, Robert (2011). A Parish at War; A military record of three Oxfordshire villages; Deddington — Clifton — Hempton. Oxford: Oxford Publishing Ltd. ISBN 978-1-870677-04-2.
- Allbrook, Michael; Forsyth, Robert (2012). A Parish at War; A military record of three Oxfordshire villages; Deddington — Clifton — Hempton; The Supplement. Oxford: Oxford Publishing Ltd.
- Beeson, CFC (1989) [1962]. Simcock, AV (ed.). Clockmaking in Oxfordshire 1400–1850 (3rd ed.). Oxford: Museum of the History of Science. p. 37. ISBN 0-903364-06-9.
- Colvin, HM (1963). A History of Deddington, Oxfordshire. London: SPCK.
- Compton, Hugh J (1976). The Oxford Canal. Newton Abbot: David & Charles. ISBN 0-7153-7238-6.
- Baggs, AP; Colvin, Christina; Colvin, HM; Cooper, Janet; Day, CJ; Selwyn, Nesta; Tomkinson, A (1983). "Deddington". In Crossley, Alan (ed.). A History of the County of Oxford. Victoria County History. Vol. XI: Wootton Hundred (northern part). London: Oxford University Press for the Institute of Historical Research. pp. 81–120. ISBN 978-0-19722-758-9.
- Ekwall, Eilert (1960) [1936]. Concise Oxford Dictionary of English Place-Names (4th ed.). Oxford: Oxford University Press. Deddington. ISBN 0198691033.
- Ivens, RJ (1984). "Deddington Castle, Oxfordshire, and the English Honour of Odo of Bayeux" (PDF). Oxoniensia. XLIX. Oxfordshire Architectural and Historical Society: 101–120.
- Risley, William Cotton (2007). Smedley-Stevenson, Geoffrey (ed.). Early Victorian Squarson – The Diaries Of Willam Cotton Risley, Vicar Of Deddington Oxfordshire. Vol. Part One 1835–1848. Witney: Robert Boyd Publications for Banbury Historical Society. ISBN 978-0-900129-27-8.
- Risley, William Cotton (2012). Smedley-Stevenson, Geoffrey (ed.). Early Victorian Squarson – The Diaries Of Willam Cotton Risley, Vicar Of Deddington Oxfordshire. Vol. Part Two 1849–1869. Witney: Robert Boyd Publications for Banbury Historical Society. ISBN 978-0-900129-30-8.
- Rose, Alexander (2003) [2002]. Kings in the North: The House of Percy in British History. Orion Publishing Group. p. 190. ISBN 1-84212-485-4.
- Sherwood, Jennifer; Pevsner, Nikolaus (1974). Oxfordshire. The Buildings of England. Harmondsworth: Penguin Books. pp. 568–572. ISBN 0-14-071045-0.
