= River Swere =

Stream in Oxfordshire, England

Coordinates: 51°59′53″N 1°17′01″W

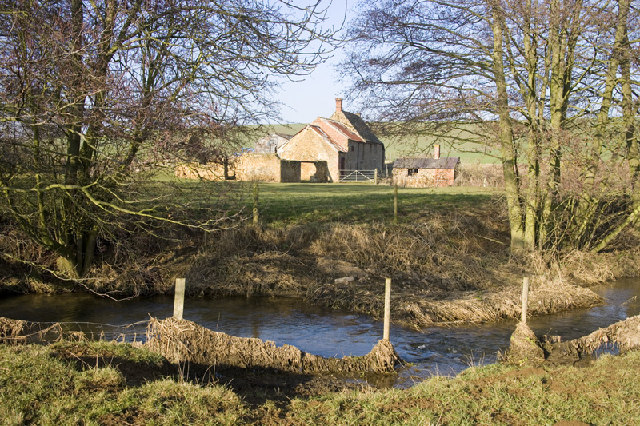
Barford St. John Mill, with the Swere running through

The River Swere is a stream in Oxfordshire, England, with a length of 2.09 kilometres and an elevation of 322 feet. The river's source lies around Swerford. It flows north towards Wigginton, and then turns east, passing just above South Newington, Barford St. Michael and Deddington before it feeds into the River Cherwell on the west side of the M40, opposite to Aynho.
