= Great Western and Great Central Joint Railway =

Railway line in England

The Great Western and Great Central Joint Railway was a railway built and operated jointly by the Great Western Railway (GWR) and Great Central Railway (GCR) between Northolt (in north west London) and Ashendon Junction (west of Aylesbury). It was laid out as a trunk route with gentle curves and gradients and spacious track layouts. The two companies each needed approach railways at both ends of the line to connect their respective systems; these were built as part of a single project.

The joint line opened in 1905 and gave the GCR a better route than previously for its London Extension from Nottingham and Leicester. When the GWR completed its "Bicester Cut-off", combined with the Joint Line itself the GWR had a much shorter and better route for its Birmingham and Birkenhead traffic.

Most of the GCR's London Extension was closed in 1966 but the Joint Line, the GCR approach through Wembley and the GWR Bicester Cut-off are still in use as a secondary main line from London to Birmingham, in intensive use by Chiltern Railways.

== Before the joint line ==
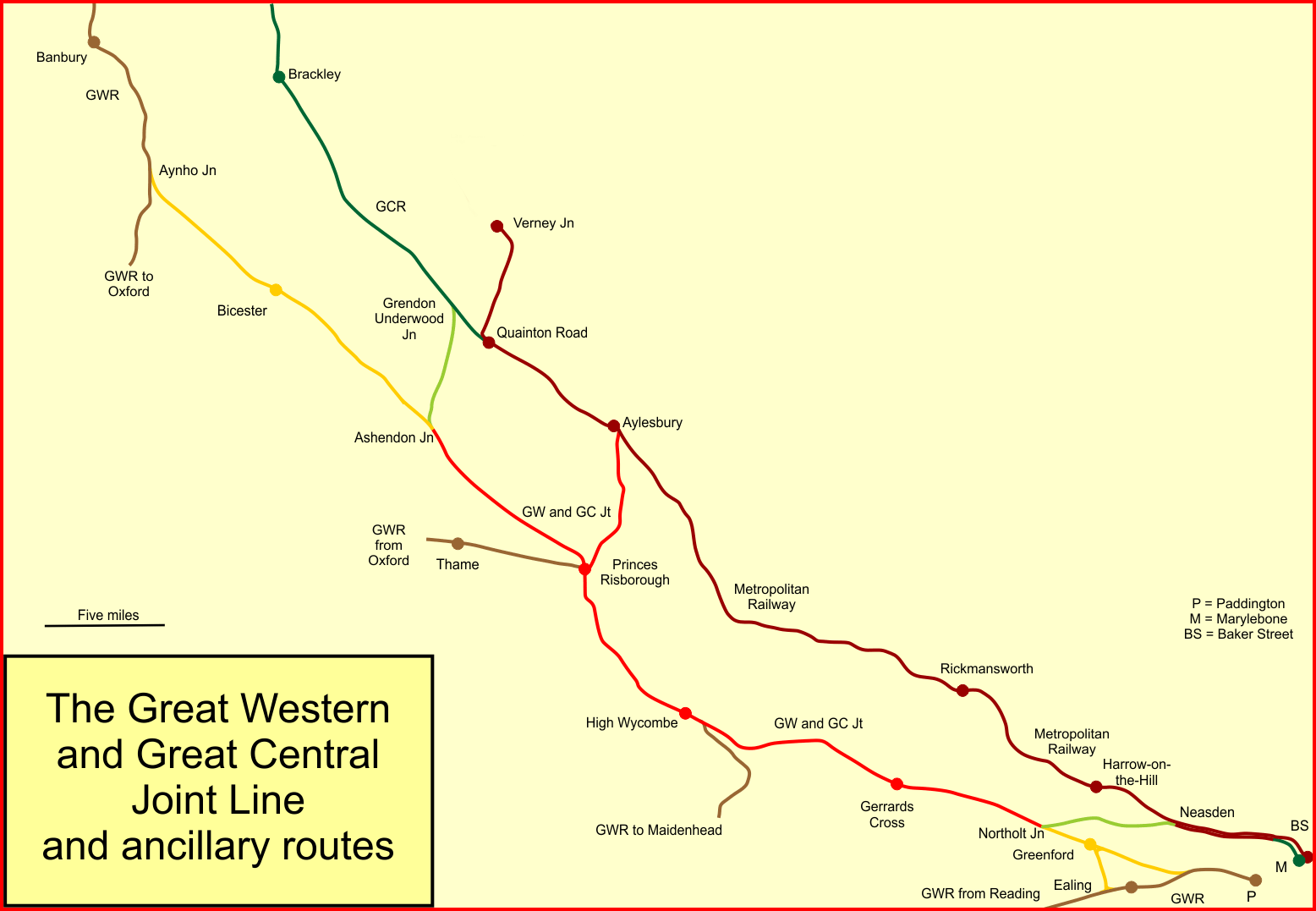
Overview of the Great Western and Great Central Joint Line

By the final decade of the nineteenth century, the Great Western Railway had consolidated its network, and according to one point of view, had failed to develop its business further. It had acquired the epithet "the Great Way Round", as many of its principal main lines took a circuitous route to the destination. This was true of the West of England and South Wales routes, and the line from London to Birmingham and Chester took a roundabout alignment by way of Didcot and Oxford.

An alternative route from London to Oxford had been opened, by way of Maidenhead, High Wycombe, (Note: The place was known to the railway as Wycombe prior to 1864.) Princes Risborough and Thame, but this had been engineered as a rural branch line and was incapable of providing trunk route facilities. The GWR obtained powers in the Great Western Railway (Additional Powers) Act 1897 (60 & 61 Vict. c. ccxlvii) for the Wycombe and Acton line: this was to provide a much more direct route to High Wycombe and on to Thame; but this was nevertheless designed as a rural branch rather than a future trunk railway route.

At the same time the Manchester, Sheffield and Lincolnshire Railway had set about transforming itself from a northern industrial concern into a trunk line, and it planned to reach London. Sir Edward Watkin was the chairman of the MS&LR and also of the Metropolitan Railway, serving areas north and west of London, and he planned to join these lines. The MS&LR obtained the Manchester, Sheffield and Lincolnshire Railway (Extension to London, &c.) Act 1893 (56 & 57 Vict. c. i), giving powers for the line, from the southern end of its network at Annesley (near Mansfield) to Quainton Road, in 1893.

In addition, there was a two-mile section of independent route at the London end, from Canfield Place (near the present-day Finchley Road station) to a new terminus at Marylebone station, and south of Neasden the Metropolitan Railway provided a pair of tracks exclusively for the MS&LR trains. The line opened in 1899; but the intermediate 40 miles from Quainton Road was over the Metropolitan Railway, already a busy railway in its own right.

Unfortunately Watkin's health failed and he resigned on 19 May 1894. His successors as the prime movers were William Pollitt (MS&LR) and John Bell (Metropolitan) and their personal relationship was not cordial. From that time relations between the MS&LR and the Metropolitan Railway cooled, and became hostile and obstructive. Excessive charges and an unrealistic proposal for working mineral traffic from Baker Street to the London, Chatham and Dover Railway started the downward trajectory of the relationship.

The Manchester, Sheffield and Lincolnshire Railway changed its name to the Great Central Railway from 1 August 1897.

The Metropolitan Railway had reached Aylesbury in 1892 and had taken over the Aylesbury and Buckingham Railway in 1891, thereby gaining a route between Aylesbury and Verney Junction via Quainton Road. However, the Great Western Railway had sponsored the Wycombe Railway, which reached Aylesbury in 1863 with its branch from Princes Risborough. In 1898 the GCR wished to send coal trains to London over the GWR Aylesbury to Princes Risborough line, and on 30 July 1898 the first such train approached Aylesbury. This was one day earlier than the agreed start date. John Bell, was the General Manager of the Metropolitan Railway and William Pollitt the General Manager of the MS&LR. Bell personally went to Quainton Road and took charge, blocking the onward journey of the train. In fact he even refused to allow the engine to draw forward to run round its train; propelling a long mineral train back wrong line was out of the question, and a major disruption occurred. The mineral traffic started the following day. He had earlier refused to allow these trains to run the relatively short distance from Quainton Road to Aylesbury until the GCR London Extension was open throughout its length. This obstruction for the sake of one day was the clearest indication that the Metropolitan Railway was not going to be a co-operative partner to the GCR. This was compounded by Bell's absolute refusal to allow mineral traffic to be worked to the GWR at Aylesbury, nor to destinations south of London over its own system.

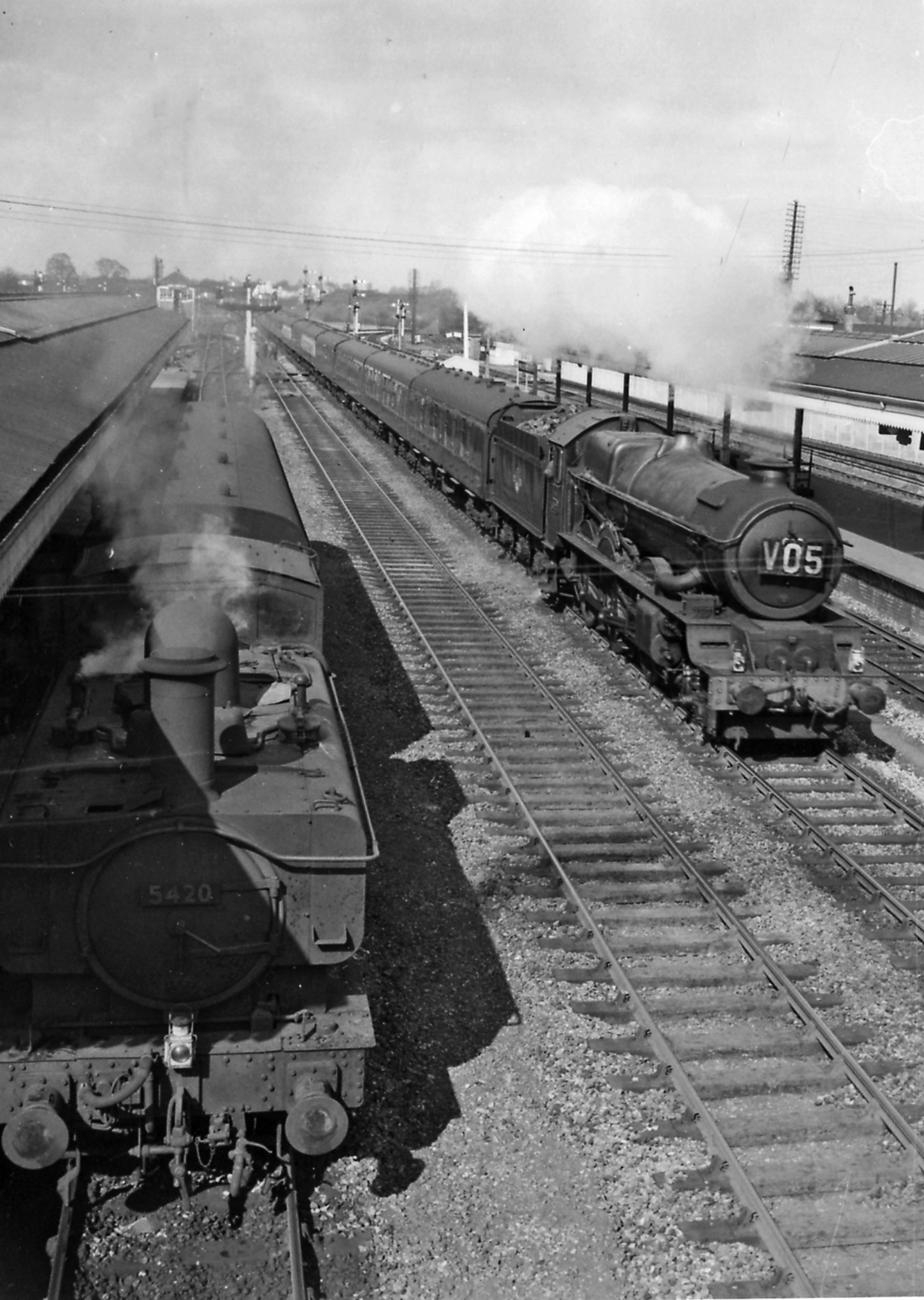
Princes Risborough in 1961

As the Great Central took stock of the Metropolitan Railway's attitude, it also re-assessed the practicality of operating a trunk main line with heavy mineral traffic as well as express passenger trains over the tracks of the Metropolitan Railway from Aylesbury southwards. As well as the congestion of a suburban passenger operation, the curvature and gradients of the Metropolitan line were unfavourable, and the GCR began to consider alternatives.

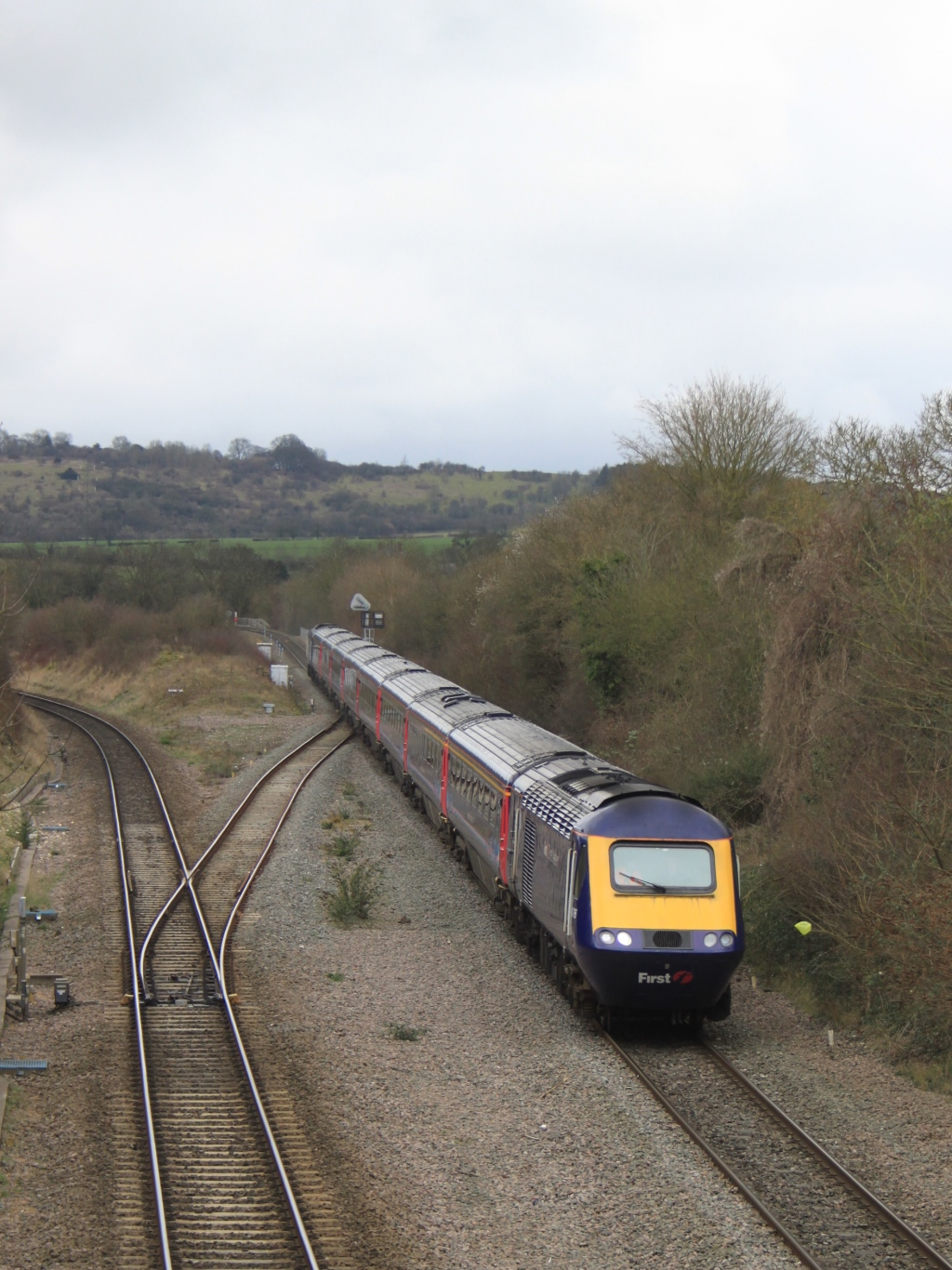
Saunderton looking south to the separate alignments

Great Western and Great Central Railways Act 1899
- Act of Parliament
- Parliament of the United Kingdom
- Long title: An Act for incorporating and conferring powers upon a Joint Committee of the Great Western and Great Central Railway Companies and for vesting in them certain existing and authorised railways of the Great Western Railway Company and authorising them to construct a new railway and other works and for other purposes.
- Citation: 62 & 63 Vict. c. cciv

Dates
- Royal assent: 1 August 1899

The Great Central Railway and the Great Western Railway had already collaborated successfully in the Banbury area and the GCR started to think of running some of its London traffic over the GWR via Oxford, or alternatively over the GWR Aylesbury branch to Princes Risborough and High Wycombe. The idea was discussed between the two companies, and a bold scheme for a new railway was developed, agreement being reached in September 1898. This would be constructed and operated by a joint committee representing the GWR and GCR, and some existing GWR route and powers for a proposed route would be taken over. A parliamentary bill was submitted and on 1 August 1899 the Great Western and Great Central Railways Joint Committee was incorporated by act of Parliament, the Great Western and Great Central Railways Act 1899 (62 & 63 Vict. c. cciv), with the necessary powers of construction and operation.

Although the rupture between the Great Central and the Metropolitan Railway was of the most violent nature, wiser counsel later prevailed: the GCR needed at the least to work over the Metropolitan line until the construction of the new route, and preferably permanently as an alternative. The Metropolitan Railway faced losing a substantial income from running powers charges, and it had already expended considerable sums on widening its line for the GCR. When tempers cooled, a co-operative relationship later resumed.

Moreover, in 1901 the two personal adversaries each retired; Sam Fay became General Manager of the Great Central and Colonel J. J. Mellor took over at Baker Street.

== The joint line: planning ==
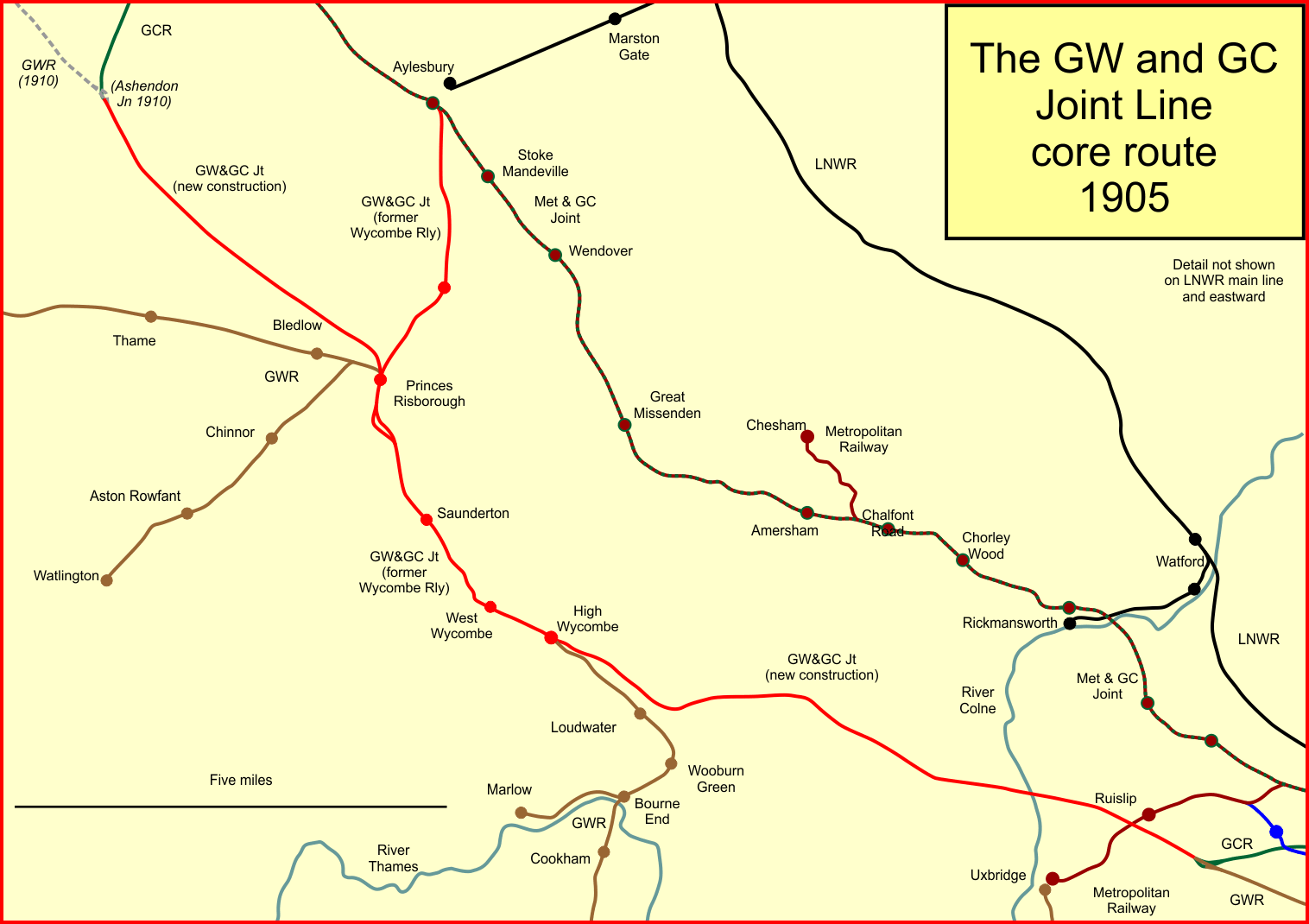
System map of the Great Western and Great Central Joint Line core section

The scope of the joint line was ambitious, and it was coupled with connecting railways for the GWR and GCR separately. The southern end of the joint line proper would be at Northolt Junction. The GWR would build the 7-mile section of the Wycombe and Acton line from Old Oak Common West Junction on the Paddington to Reading main line, near Acton, to Northolt Junction.

The GCR would build a line 6 1/4 miles long from Neasden Junction on its planned new route from Marylebone (at this point independent of the Metropolitan Railway, so permitting free access to the London terminus.) It was authorised by Parliament in 1898. The GCR line from Neasden to Northolt was let to a contractor in the value of £168,000 but a serious overrun in costs resulted in this section costing over £300,000.

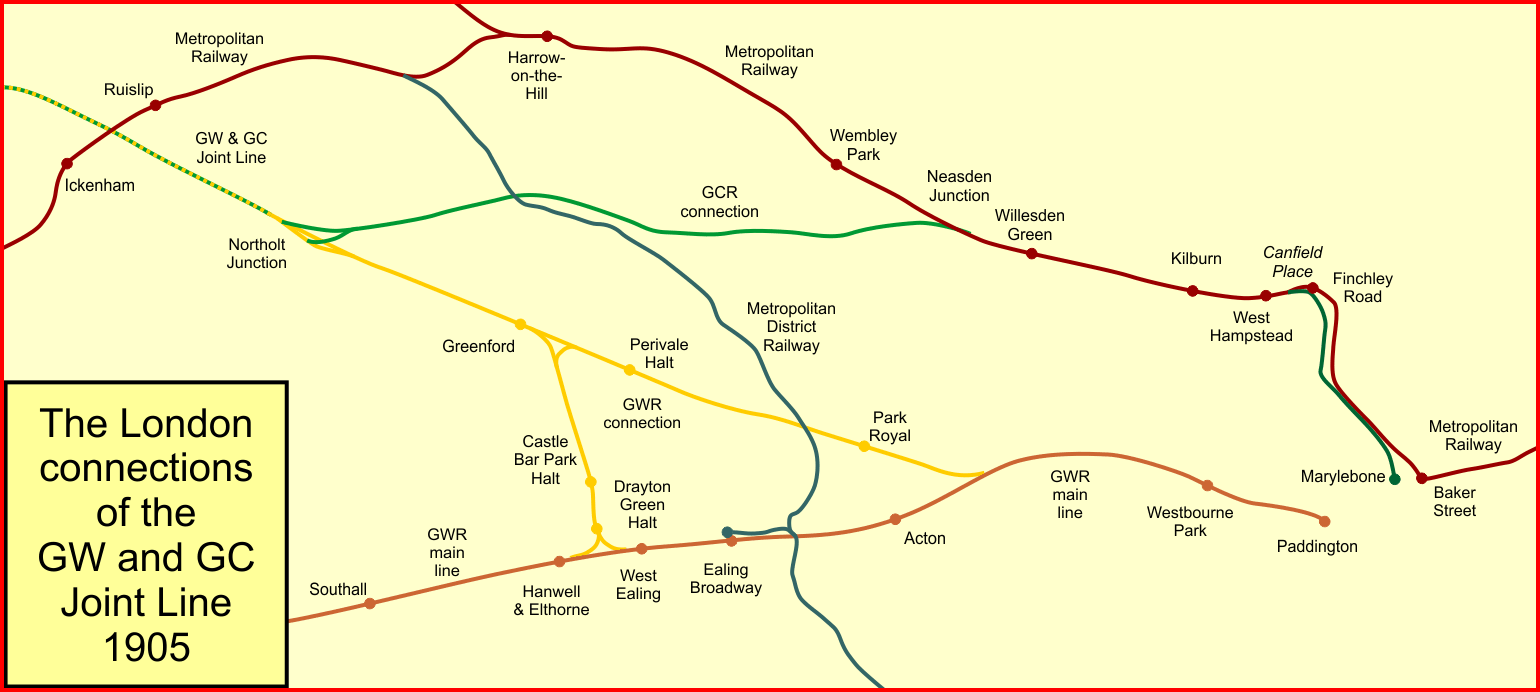
System map of the London end connections of the Great Western and Great Central Joint Line

From Northolt Junction the joint line would take over the relevant part of the powers of the (unbuilt) Wycombe and Acton line, and then take over the part of the GWR line (former Wycombe Railway) from there to Princes Risborough, taking the opportunity to improve the alignment for main line running and double the track. The contract for the line from Northolt to High Wycombe was valued at £580,000.

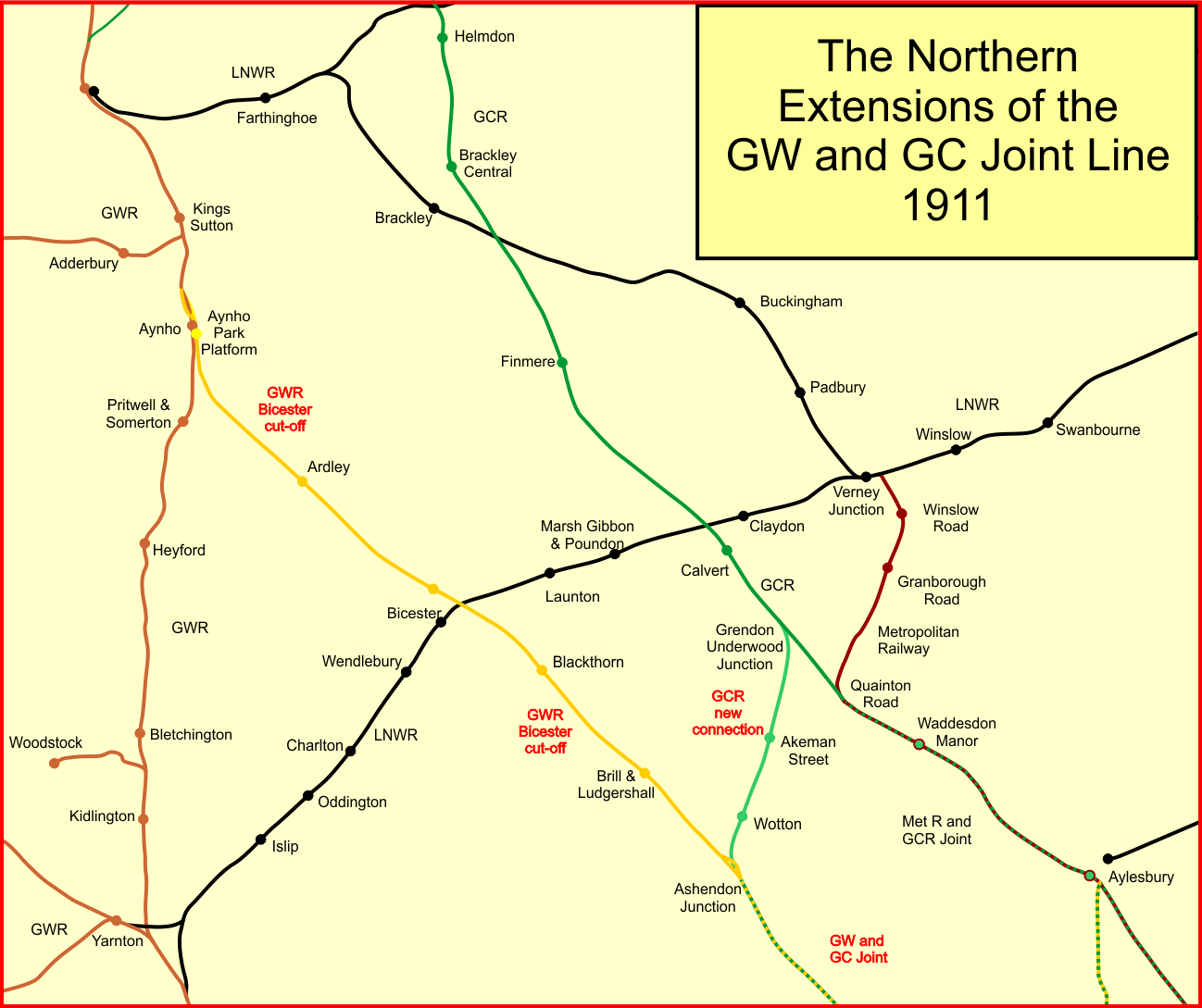
System map of the northern connections to the Great Western and Great Central Joint Line

From Princes Risborough northwards there would be a new route to Grendon Underwood, on the GCR new "London Extension" route; this junction was a few miles north of Quainton Road, so that reliance on the Metropolitan Railway would be avoided.

The GWR had originally intended to use the Thame route to reach Oxford from Princes Risborough by upgrading the former Wycombe Railway route. This was however considered a roundabout route and the GWR now decided to build a 5 3/4 mile direct link from further north on the GCR part of the new line to Banbury. A junction was to be made at Ashendon, between Princes Risborough and Grendon Underwood, and this GWR section of line would join the Oxford to Banbury line at a new junction at Aynho, not far south of Banbury. Under this revision, the actual joint section of the new construction was from Northolt Junction to Ashendon Junction, a distance of 34 miles, but the scheme involved a total of 73 1/4 miles of new double track: the last major new railway construction in Great Britain until the Channel Tunnel Rail Link of 2003.

Between Saunderton and Princes Risborough, the Wycombe Railway single line descended steeply and had a tight curve, and the new down line was to be deviated from it somewhat to ease the gradient to a maximum of 1 in 87 and to ease the curve. The abandoned formation of the original Wycombe Railway may still be detected. Even 1 in 87 was considered to be too steep an uphill gradient for heavily laden freight trains heading for London, so the new up line was planned to take a slightly different alignment with a deep cutting and a short tunnel, enabling a maximum rising gradient of 1 in 167.

In addition a new short line was to be built by the GWR between Ealing on the Reading main line and Greenford on the Northolt line.

== Construction and opening ==
The single track from High Wycombe to Princes Risborough was taken over on 1 August 1899. Construction of the joint line and its approach routes was started in 1901, under the management of the Great Western Railway. R. C. Sikes was the resident engineer.

The easternmost part of the GWR line forming a circuit from Old Oak Common through Park Royal and then curving to West Ealing, was opened on 15 June 1903, enabling a passenger service to Park Royal for the Royal Agricultural Show there. The line was closed again west of Park Royal from 10 August because of concerns about the stability of embankments after exceptionally heavy rainfall. The line opened again on 1 May 1904, and in October 1904 the short extension from Greenford East Junction to Greenford station was opened.

The following year, on 20 November 1905 the whole line between Greenford and Grendon Underwood was opened for goods trains. At the same time the Neasden to Northolt GCR section was opened. On 1 March 1906 the latter section was opened for passenger trains in the form of railmotors. The first 1 3/4 miles from Neasden were quadruple track; the remainder was double line. There were stations at Wembley Hill (on the four track section) and at Sudbury & Harrow Road railway station and at South Harrow; at the latter two places passenger loops were provided for the platforms, with the through lines in the centre.

The GCR opened a short section from Neasden to South Harrow (later renamed Sudbury Hill (Harrow) from 1 March 1906. The Chalfont Viaduct was constructed 1902–1906 to cross the River Misbourne near Gerrards Cross. Passenger opening of the entire Joint Line took place on 2 April 1906; on that date stations were opened (or re-opened) at Ruislip & Ickenham, Denham, Gerrard's Cross, Beaconsfield, High Wycombe, Saunderton, Princes Risborough and Haddenham. All of the stations were laid out in lavish style, with the buildings in typical GWR designs. Greenford, Denham, Gerrard's Cross and Beaconsfield had passenger loops for the platforms.

The Ashendon Junction to Grendon Underwood section, being Great Central territory, was designed in that company's style, which included the signalbox at Ashendon Junction. Intermediate stations on the section were Wotton and Akeman Street; these were also lavish structures. Goods facilities on the line were relatively limited, except at High Wycombe, in recognition of the fact that local goods traffic was unlikely to develop vigorously. The early train service was dominated by GWR trains from Paddington to Oxford and Aylesbury and GCR long distance expresses and local stopping trains.

== The Bicester cut-off ==
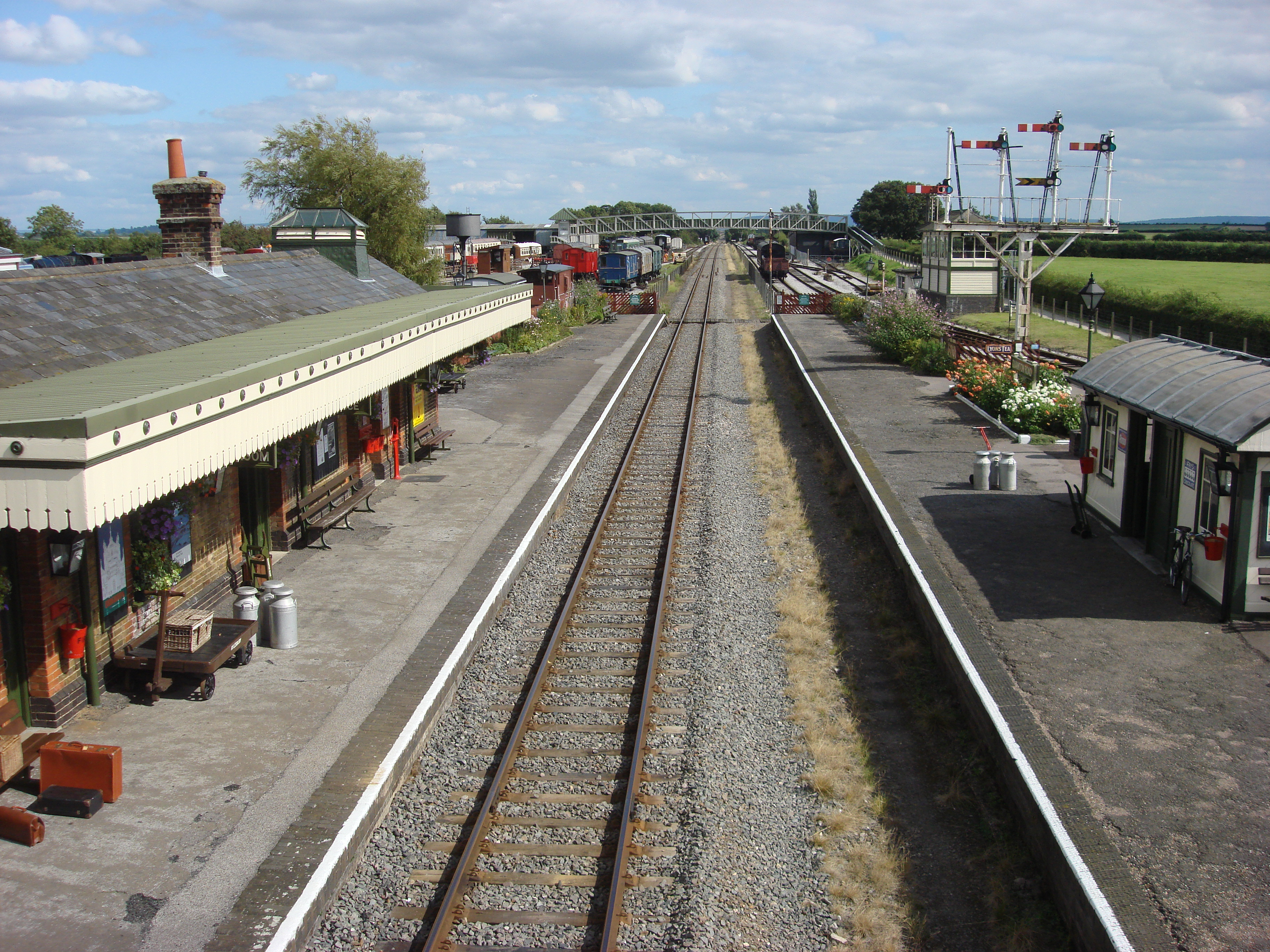
Quainton Road station; now a heritage railway centre

An essential part of the GWR intentions was the 18 1/4-mile (29 km) connection between Ashendon Junction and Aynho Junction, referred to as the Bicester cut-off. Powers were obtained for the construction in 1905. The topography of the area was unfavourable to railway routing and a tunnel (Ardley Tunnel) of 1,147 yards (1,049 m) and two large viaducts were required. Grade-separated junctions were provided at each end of the line, at Ashendon and Aynho Junctions.

The Bicester cut-off was opened for goods traffic on 4 April 1910 and to passengers on 1 July 1910. The new route as between London and Birmingham was 18 1/2 miles (30 km) shorter than the former route via Oxford, and a shortening of the fastest journey time of 20 minutes (from 140 to 120 minutes) was achieved; most of the through trains were immediately transferred to the new route.

There were stations at Brill & Ludgershall, Blackthorn, Bicester and Ardley and a halt at Aynho Park. Brill, Bicester and Ardley stations had the four track layout with platform loop lines. Bicester was the only place with a substantial goods facility.

== Status of the joint line ==
Jenkins makes clear the status of the joint line:

The G.W. & G. C. was never a "Joint Railway" in the sense that the M. & G. N. Jt. or Somerset & Dorset lines were joint: it owned no engines or rolling stock of its own, and was not a system in its own right (a railway from Northolt to Ashendon would be completely useless without its vital links to the parent companies).

The ownership of the completed construction was:

- Old Oak Common West Junction to Northolt Junction: 7 miles; GWR

Greenford to West Ealing: 2 1/2 miles; GWR

- Neasden Junction to Northolt Junction: 6 1/4 miles; GCR;
- Northolt Junction to Ashendon Junction: 34 miles; GWR and GCR jointly;
- Ashendon Junction to Grendon Underwood Junction: 5 3/4 miles; GCR; this had originally been intended to be part of the joint line, but was transferred from the joint committee to the GCR by the Great Central Railway Act 1907 (7 Edw. 7. c. lxxviii);
- Ashendon Junction to Aynho Junction: 18 1/4 miles; GWR.

The existing Aylesbury branch of the Wycombe Railway was taken into the control of the Joint Committee. It was 7 miles 18 chains in length. From 1907 Aylesbury station was under the joint control of two joint committees, the GW & GC Joint Committee and the Great Central and Metropolitan Railways Joint Committee.

== Suburban development ==
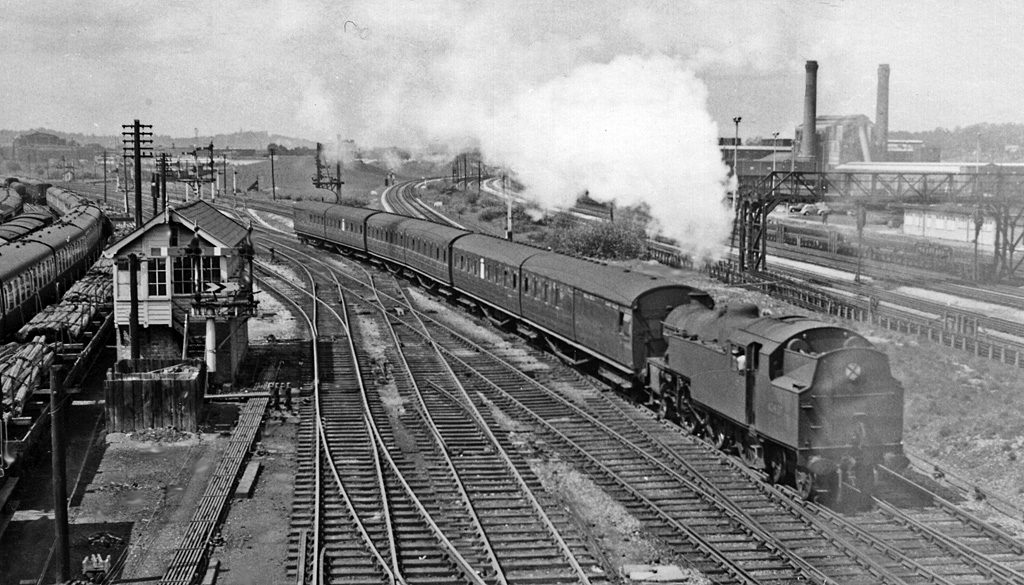
Neasden Junction looking north; a football special from Wembley is leaving the route from Northolt

At the time of opening of the line, much of the route passed through undeveloped rural terrain. The companies anticipated the development of new suburban housing, as had happened on the Metropolitan Railway main line, although this proved slower to take place than was hoped.

New stations were opened progressively to encourage business: Old Oak Lane Halt in 1906; Northolt Halt in 1907; Brentham Halt in 1911; Denham Golf Club Platform in 1912; Beaconsfield Golf Links Platform in 1915.

Steam railmotors were used on the London end of the line from 1903, giving the potential for frequent low-cost local passenger train operation. In 1907 a branch line was opened by the GWR from Denham to Uxbridge; the work cost £87,459. The trains ran from Gerrards Cross, starting on 24 April; goods traffic started on 11 May 1914. The line was originally intended to connect through to the Vine Street station, terminus of the earlier Uxbridge branch from West Drayton. Although some land for the connection was acquired, the through section was never built, and the branch remained a dead end; it was two miles in length and double track until 1922, when it as reduced to single line.

In 1912 the GCR purchased a rail-car using petrol-electric traction. It was a small bogie vehicle equipped with a 90 hp six-cylinder petrol engine driving a 55 KW multi-polar dynamo. Maximum speed was 40 m.p.h. on the level. The rest of the car consisted of two passenger saloons accommodating between them 50 passengers on rattan covered reversible seats; hanging straps were also provided for standing passengers. A middle entrance gave access to both compartments.

Fay told the press that ‘My view is that we shall see oil electric cars running on the railways and supplanting ordinary steam engines to a very great extent.' On 28 March 1912 it ran a trial trip from Marylebone to South Harrow and back, when it attained 50 m.p.h. For a period it remained in the London area, sometimes hauling an ancient ex-MS&L six-wheeled composite as a trailer, but it was unsuccessful and its last days were spent on the Great Central & North Stafford joint line in the mid-1930s. (Note: Edwards & Pigram (1982) say that at the first opening of the GCR Neasden to Northolt line, Sudbury Hill (Harrow) station "became a terminus for a short time of the first passenger services on the line (1 March to 2 April 1906). The service was worked by a revolutionary vehicle – a petrol-electric rail car powered by a 90hp engine. The rail car had a top speed of 40 mph and seated 50 passengers in four compartments." This appears to be the same vehicle, but the date must be a mistake.)

== World War I to nationalisation (1918 to 1948) ==
After World War I the anticipated suburban development took effect more vigorously, and in due course Harefield and Ruislip Gardens stations were opened.

On 15 February 1918 a serious slip became apparent behind the massive retaining wall west of Wembley Hill station. On 18 February all four tracks had to be closed while remedial work was undertaken; through trains were diverted to Paddington. In a few minutes a 200 yard section of the wall had moved bodily forward by more than twenty feet. Two temporary tracks were got open in seven days; the final cost of restoration was over £84,000.

On 18 July 1918 a serious slip took place at Wembley Hill, on the GCR approach line from Neasden. The location had originally been intended to run in tunnel, but a very deep cutting (70 feet) was substituted. The line was closed for two weeks while remedial work was carried out; GCR passenger services ran to Paddington during the closure.

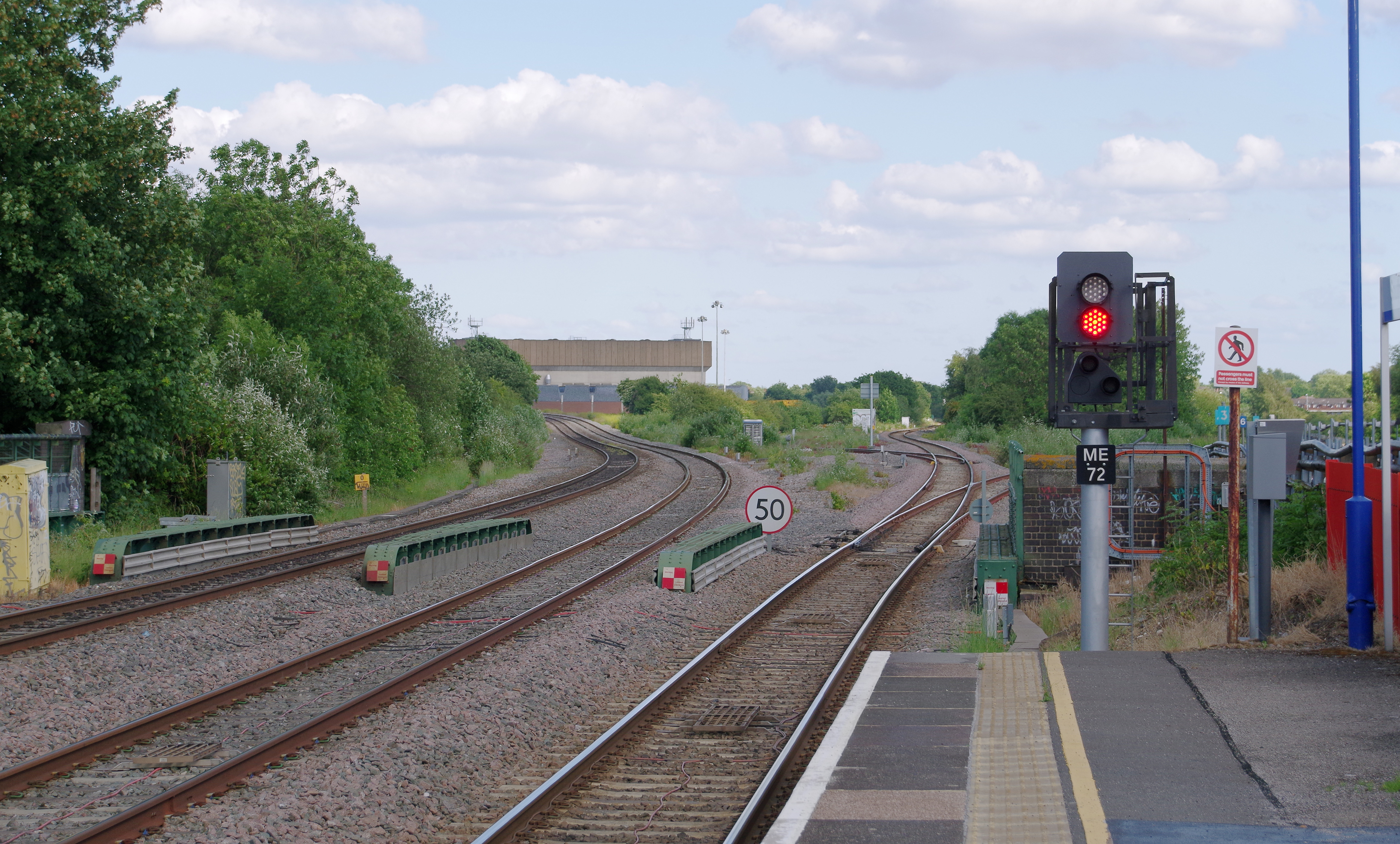
South Ruislip station and Northolt Junction in modern times; the former GW route is to the right and the GCR route is to the left

In 1923 the main line railways were "grouped" into one or other of four new large railway companies; the Great Central Railway was a constituent of the new London and North Eastern Railway; the Great Western Railway was restructured with the addition of some South Wales concerns, but the new company retained the Great Western Railway name. For the time being the London "Underground" network was not treated in this way, but in 1933 the London Passenger Transport Board was formed, taking over the Metropolitan Railway and other London Underground lines.

The LPTB in collaboration with the LNER and GWR examined ways in which the now-heavy suburban business in Middlesex might be handled, and a scheme was formulated which became part of the 1935 – 1940 New Works Programme; the GWR would build new electrified tracks from North Acton, on the Ealing and Shepherds Bush line, running alongside the Joint Line as far as Denham. The authorising Act was secured in 1936 and by the outbreak of World War II the new track was ready as far as Greenford. Work was suspended during the war, and in fact the new track was lifted and used for emergency purposes elsewhere.

After the war the scheme was resumed, but only as far as West Ruislip, opening throughout on 21 November 1948. Northolt station was transferred to LT control (the remainder being transferred to LT in 1967); at Greenford a new bay platform was provided between the LT platforms for the Ealing Broadway steam service, freeing up the through platforms at Greenford for trains towards High Wycombe. During the 1930s the majority of the through express services were operated by the GWR; the route formed its main line to Birmingham and Birkenhead. The GCR express operation was rather reduced, concentrating on the route via Amersham; the GCR operated most of the local suburban services. About 25 goods trains ran each way daily, broadly shared between the two companies.

The GWR Denham to Uxbridge branch had never fulfilled its potential, and the passenger service was discontinued in 1939.

During World War II the line experienced heavy goods traffic in common with many other routes; the well laid out line with long straight loops and other ample facilities served well in the emergency, and in contrast to many other routes, relatively little enhancement of the infrastructure was necessary to cope.

In 1948 the main line railways of Great Britain were taken into public ownership, under British Railways. The route was allocated to the Western Region, but the Marylebone train services were operated by the Eastern Region, perpetuating an element of the "joint" status of the line.

== Under British Railways: from 1948 ==
The allocation of the Marylebone services to the Eastern Region did not last long, and repeated changes of management structure took place. Even prior to nationalisaton, the trunk line status of the Great Central Railway London Extension as a passenger route was viewed as an unnecessary duplication, with a fairly sparse service of expresses. The Master Cutler, a prime Sheffield express was moved to the Kings Cross route in 1958 (and later still to the Midland main line). However, under the British Rail Modernisation Plan of 1955 the GC London Extension and the joint line were to have been developed as a freight corridor, with new "country" marshalling yards staked out at Woodford Halse and at Swanbourne, near Bletchley. This plan was soon abandoned in favour of developing new yards in metropolitan areas, such as at Healey Mills and Tinsley. In 1960 the last London express passenger trains were transferred away from the line, leaving a semi-fast service of only three trains per day between Marylebone and Nottingham and inter-regional holiday traffic to the south coast. There remained a considerable freight traffic for the time being; much of this was coal to London, which declined as laws to reduce smog took effect. Another large proportion of the freight was iron ore from Northamptonshire and Lincolnshire to South Wales - a traffic that was soon to be lost as the opencast iron ore deposits were commercially exhausted. Intermediate stations on the London Extension were closed in 1963.

On the other hand, the Western Region trains from Paddington to Birmingham and beyond continued, and the majority of the suburban trains on the route ran to Marylebone. The primacy of steam ceased when all the Marylebone local trains were operated by diesel multiple units from June 1962, and the Birmingham main line trains were progressively transferred to diesel haulage from the same time.

In the 1950s and 1960s the mounting financial losses on the railways had been exercising government, and it was clear that a re-shaping and rationalisation of the network was necessary along with elimination of unprofitable traffic. The Beeching Report, ratifying a difficult but inevitable decision that had already been made prior to Beeching's appointment, resulted in complete closure of the Great Central London Extension between Quainton Road and Rugby Central on 3 September 1966; Rugby - Nottingham was closed in 1969. The Denham - Uxbridge branch had also declined substantially as a goods line since 1939 and was closed completely in the 1960s.

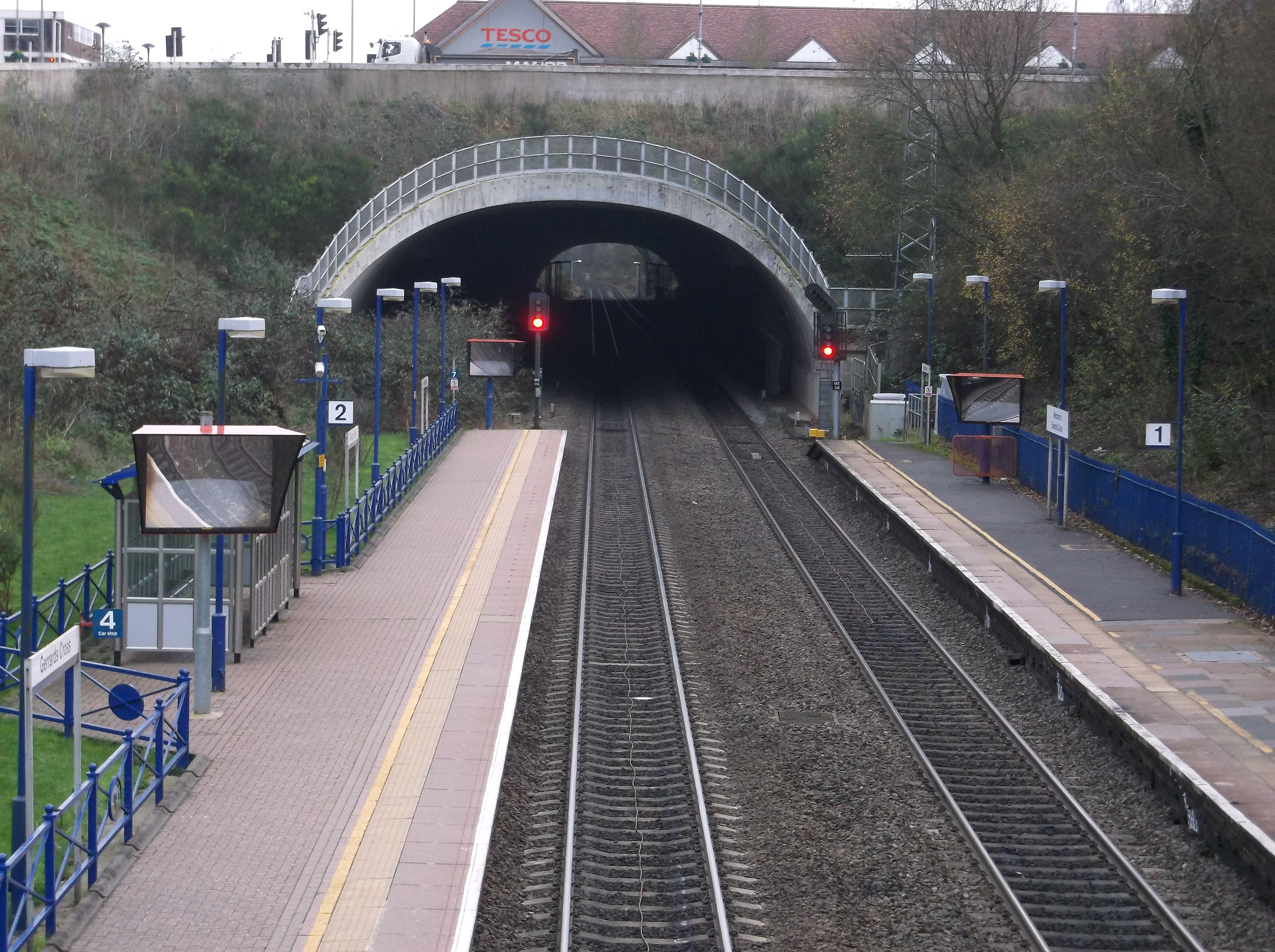
Looking south from Gerrards Cross

The former LNWR West Coast Main Line (WCML) route from Euston to Birmingham and Crewe was developed at this time as the primary route on that axis. During the electrification and infrastructure improvement works, Birmingham express passenger traffic was concentrated on the Western Region route over the Joint Line, while other WCML traffic was diverted south of Bletchley to run to/from Marylebone via the Bletchley Flyover and the GC route at Calvert.

On inauguration of the enhanced Euston route, the Joint line ceased to have validity as a trunk line, and from 5 March 1967 through long-distance services were removed from the line. The intermediate stations received a somewhat enhanced semi-fast service. In the Autumn of 1968 the line between Princes Risborough and Aynho Junction (26 miles) was singled, and in 1974 many through semi-fast trains were diverted away from the line, to run via Oxford.

== Closure of branches ==
The Thame line, between Princes Risborough and Oxford, closed to passenger traffic on 7 January 1963. An oil terminal at Thame and a car factory at Morris Cowley kept the extremities of the route open for goods traffic for the time being.

On 4 May 1969 the former Wycombe Railway line between High Wycombe and Bourne End was closed.

== Present day use ==
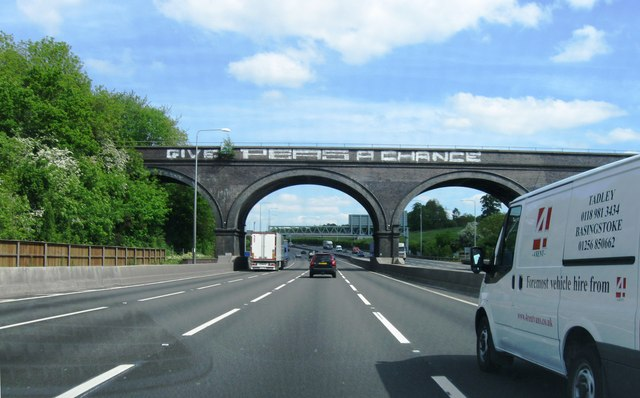
The Chiltern Main Line now passes over the M25 motorway via the Chalfont Viaduct

During a period of decline in the 1960s and afterwards, the remaining part of the Joint Line and the approach lines were from Banbury to Marylebone, and from Northolt Junction to Old Oak Common (as well as the Greenford to West Ealing line). The route is now described as the Chiltern Main Line.

The use of the line was revitalised following privatisation of the train operations in Great Britain, and Chiltern Railways operated an increasingly improved secondary service between London (Marylebone) and Birmingham (Moor Street). This was attractive politically as providing competition to the dominant route from Euston via Rugby.

The Chiltern operation continues at the present day (2024) with frequent passenger services between Birmingham and London, enhanced by the construction of a spur at Bicester (connecting to the west to east Oxford to Bletchley line) enabling Oxford to London services to run via Bicester.

== Topography ==
=== Acton and Northolt Line (GWR) ===
- Old Oak Common West Junction;
- Old Oak Lane Halt; opened 1 October 1906; closed 1 February 1915; reopened 29 March 1920; closed 30 June 1947;
- North Acton Halt; opened 1 May 1904; closed 1 February 1913;
- Park Royal; opened 15 to 22 June 1903 and 29 June to 4 July 1903 for exhibitors, and again 23 to 27 June 1903 for public at Royal Show; public opening 1 May 1904; closed 1 February 1915; reopened 29 March 1920; closed 26 September 1937;
- Park Royal West; opened 20 June 1932; last train 15 June 1947;
- Twyford Abbey Halt; opened 1 May 1904; closed 1 May 1911;
- Brentham; opened 1 May 1911; closed 1 February 1915; reopened 29 March 1920; closed 15 June 1947;
- Perivale Halt; opened 1 May 1904; closed 1 February 1915; reopened 29 March 1920; closed 15 June 1947;
- Greenford East Junction;
- Greenford; opened 1 October 1904; closed 17 June 1963;
- Northolt Halt; opened 1 May 1907; Northolt from 1929; closed 21 November 1948;
- Northolt Junction.

=== Neasden and Northolt Line ===
- Neasden Junction;
- Wembley Hill; opened 1 March 1906; renamed Wembley Complex 1978; renamed Wembley Stadium 1987; still open;
- Sudbury and Harrow Road; opened 1 March 1906; still open;
- South Harrow; opened 1 March 1906; renamed Sudbury Hill Harrow 1926; still open;
- South Harrow and Roxeth; opened 19 July 1926; renamed Northolt Park 1929; still open;
- Northolt Junction;

=== Joint Line ===
Neasden Junction;

- Northolt Junction; opened 1 May 1908; renamed South Ruislip and Northolt Junction 1932; renamed South Ruislip 1947; still open;
- Ruislip Gardens; opened 9 July 1934; closed 21 July 1958;
- Ruislip and Ickenham; opened 2 April 1906; renamed West Ruislip 1947; still open;
- Harefield Halt; opened 24 September 1928; renamed South Harefield 1929; closed 1 October 1931;
- Denham East Junction;
- Denham West Junction;
- Denham; opened 2 April 1906; still open;
- Denham Golf Club Platform; opened 22 July 1912; still open;
- Chalfont Viaduct (M25 crossing); opened 2 April 1906;
- Gerrards Cross Tunnel (2007);
- Gerrards Cross; opened 2 April 1906; still open;
- Beaconsfield Golf Links; opened for golfers 2 April 1906; public opened on 23 December 1914; renamed Seer Green 1918; renamed Seer Green and Jordans 1950; renamed Seer Green 1974; still open;
- Beaconsfield; opened 2 April 1906; still open;
- Whitehouse Tunnel; 152 yards;
- High Wycombe; opened 1 August 1854; relocated 1 October 1964 when High added; still open
- West Wycombe; opened 1 August 1862; closed 3 November 1958;
- Saunderton; opened 1 July 1901 still open;
- Saunderton Tunnel; up line only; 88 yards;
- Princes Risborough; opened 1 August 1862; relocated to the south 2 April 1906; still open;
- Ilmer Halt; opened 1 April 1929; closed 7 January 1963;
- Haddenham; opened 2 April 1906; closed 7 January 1963;
- Haddenham and Thame Parkway; opened 5 October 1987; still open;
- Ashendon Junction.

=== Ashendon Junction to Grendon Underwood Junction (GCR) ===
- Ashendon Junction;
- Wotton; opened 2 April 1906; closed 7 December 1953;
- Akeman Street; opened 2 April 1906; closed 7 July 1930;
- Grendon Underwood Junction.

=== Ashendon Junction to Aynho Junction ("Bicester Cut-off", GWR) ===
- Dorton Halt; opened 21 June 1937; closed 7 January 1963;
- Brill Tunnel; 191 yards;
- Brill and Ludgershall; opened 1 July 1910; closed 7 January 1963;
- Blackthorn; opened 1 July 1910; closed 8 June 1953;
- Bicester; opened 1 July 1910; renamed Bicester North 1949; still open;
- Ardley; opened 1 July 1910; closed 7 January 1963;
- Ardley Tunnel; 1147 yards;
- Aynho Park Platform; opened 1 July 1910; closed 7 January 1963;
- Aynho Junction.
