= Aynho for Deddington railway station =

Former railway station in Northamptonshire, England

Coordinates: 51.98804°N 1.27504°W

Aynho for Deddington
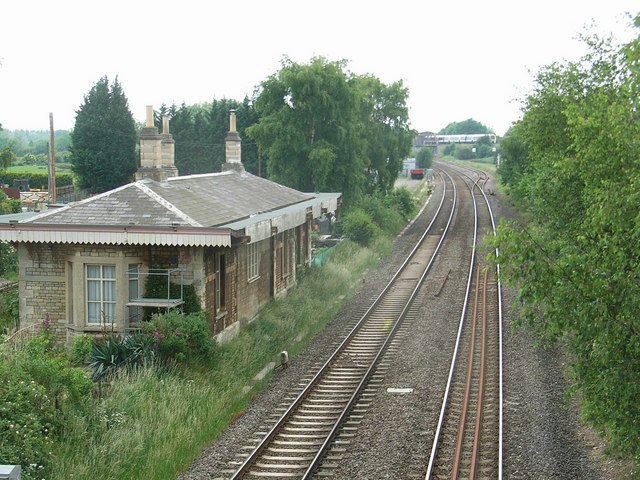
- View of the station site in May 2009, with the original station building on the left. In the background a northbound train can be seen on the flyover of Aynho Junction

General information
- Location: Aynho, Northamptonshire; England
- Grid reference: SP498324
- Platforms: 2

Other information
- Status: Disused

History
- Original company: Oxford & Rugby Railway
- Pre-grouping: Great Western Railway
- Post-grouping: Great Western Railway; Western Region of British Railways

Key dates
- 2 September 1850: Station opens as Aynho
- Unknown: Station renamed Aynho for Deddington
- 2 November 1964: Station closes
Location

Aynho for Deddington railway station was a railway station serving the village of Aynho in Northamptonshire, England. It was on what is now known as the Cherwell Valley Line.

== History ==
When the first section of the Oxford and Rugby Railway was opened as far as Banbury on 2 September 1850, there were only three intermediate stations, the northernmost of which was Aynho. The Oxford & Rugby Railway was absorbed by the Great Western Railway prior to opening.

An accident occurred close to the station on 30 September 1852 when a special train ran into the back of a stopping train. The special train was to celebrate the opening of the Birmingham and Oxford Junction Railway and the locomotive, The Lord of The Isles, was being driven by Mr Brunel and Mr Gooch. The accident occurred because the stopping train to Banbury was a little delayed as it was market day, and the station master wasn't aware of the special train until it appeared at "very great speed". The driver of the Banbury train got his train moving to reduce the impact, but in the accident the Lord of the Isles was derailed and damaged, and several people were seriously injured.

The railway was broad gauge when built, but eventually the Great Western Railway lost their battle to spread the broad gauge further North. With the standardisation of gauge this line was one of the first main lines to be converted, the last broad gauge train from Oxford to Birmingham ran at the end of March 1869.

An unpleasant accident occurred at the station in September 1884, when the guard of a goods train was hit by the 11:40 express train. His body was reportedly "cut to pieces" and the parts of his "body were scattered all about the line".

To the north of the station is Aynho Junction, the northern end of the Bicester "cut-off" line, which was brought into use in 1910. This route passes close to Aynho station, and a nearby station named Aynho Park was provided on the Bicester "cut-off" route.

Another fatality occurred at the station in August 1942 when Baroness Lilian Helen van Lennep (a Dutch national), who had been staying with Lady Fairfax Cartwright (widow of Fairfax Leighton Cartwright) at The Grammar House, was struck by an express train while crossing the line via the barrow crossing.

The station passed on to the Western Region of British Railways on nationalisation in 1948. It was then closed by the British Railways Board, to goods on 4 May 1964 and to passengers on 2 November 1964, along with three other stations between Leamington Spa and Didcot; by this time it had been renamed Aynho for Deddington. GWR sources and Railway Clearing House guides erroneously listed this as Aynho for Doddington from time to time.

Preceding station	Historical railways	Following station
King's Sutton; Line and station open	Great Western Railway; Oxford and Rugby Railway	Fritwell & Somerton; Line open, station closed

== The site today ==
Trains on the Cherwell Valley Line pass the site.
