= Bicester railway station =

Bicester railway station may refer to one of two railway stations in the town of Bicester (United Kingdom):

- Bicester North railway station, on the Chiltern main line between London and Birmingham
- Bicester Village railway station, which sees a limited service to Oxford (previously Bicester Town 1987–2015, Bicester London Road 1954–1987, Bicester 1850–1954)
