= Heyford railway station =

Railway station in Oxfordshire, England

Coordinates: 51.919°N 1.299°W

Heyford
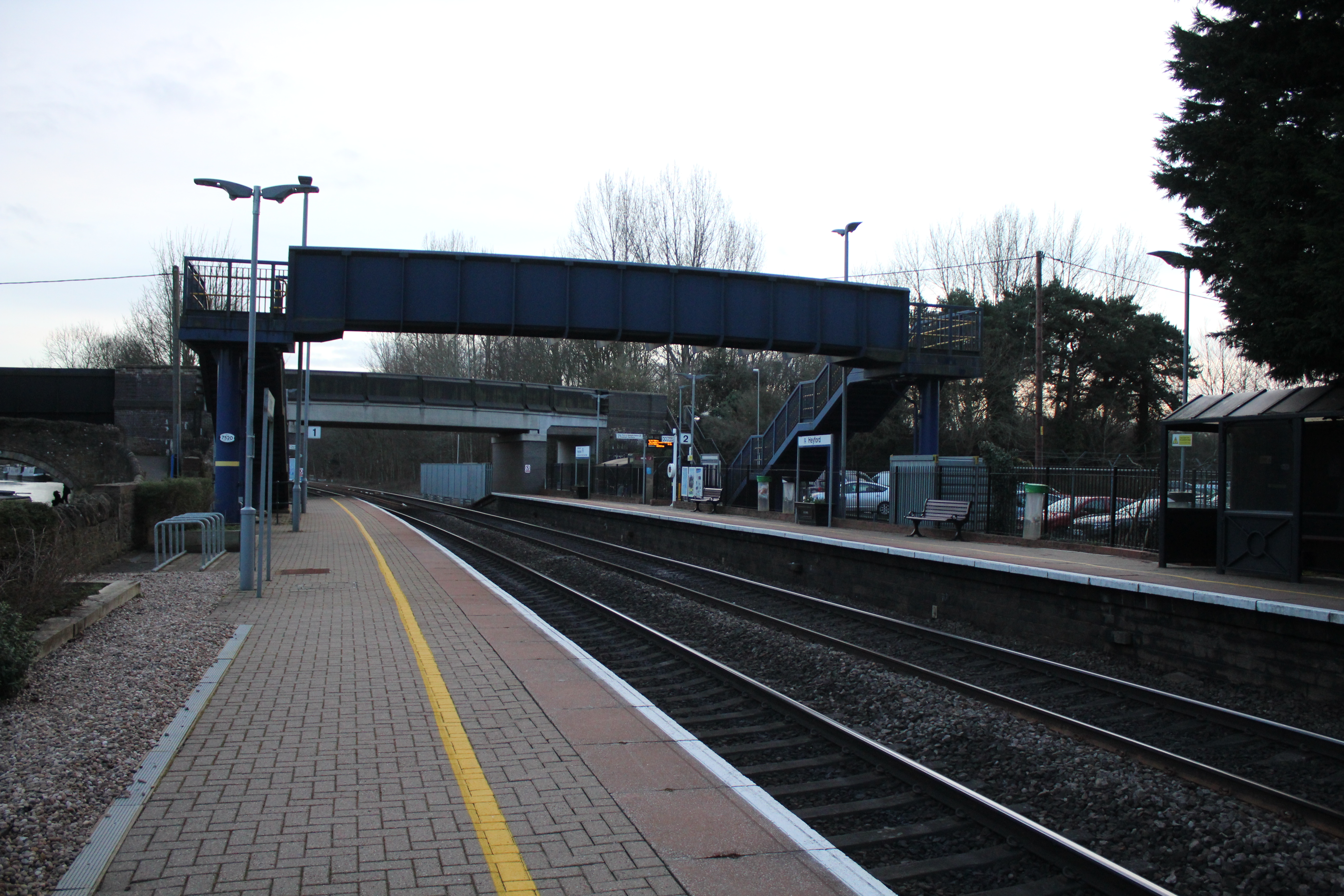

General information
- Location: Lower Heyford, Cherwell; England
- Grid reference: SP483247
- Manager: Great Western Railway
- Platforms: 2

Other information
- Station code: HYD
- Classification: DfT category F2

History
- Opened: 2 September 1850
- Original company: Oxford and Rugby Railway
- Pre-grouping: Great Western Railway
- Post-grouping: Great Western Railway

Passengers
- 2021/22: ▲23,210
- 2022/23: ▲31,412
- 2023/24: ▲33,430
- 2024/25: ▲45,552
- 2025/26: ▲45,946
Location
Notes
- Passenger statistics from the Office of Rail and Road

Heyford railway station serves the village of Lower Heyford and surrounding areas in Oxfordshire, England. It is on the Cherwell Valley Line and is ideally located for visiting the Oxford Canal and Heyford Wharf, which are both alongside. The station, and 10 trains each Monday to Saturday serving it, are operated by Great Western Railway.

It is 75 miles 21 chains (121.1 km) measured from London Paddington via Didcot Parkway.

== Services ==
Most services at Heyford are operated by Great Western Railway, with a very limited service operated by Chiltern Railways.

The typical off-peak service is one train every two hours in each direction between Didcot Parkway and Banbury, operated by Great Western Railway. Additional services call at the station during the peak hours. The station is also served by a single late evening service from Oxford to Banbury, operated by Chiltern Railways on weekdays only.

On Sundays, the station is served by three Great Western Railway services in each direction between Oxford and Banbury during the summer months (between May and September) only. No services call at the station on Sundays during the winter months.

Preceding station	National Rail	Following station
Tackley	Great Western Railway Cherwell Valley Line	Kings Sutton
Tackley	Chiltern Railways Cherwell Valley Line Limited Service	Kings Sutton
Historical railways
Tackley Line and station open	Great Western Railway Oxford and Rugby Railway	Fritwell & Somerton Line open, station closed
