= Blackthorn railway station =

Disused railway station in Blackthorn, Oxfordshire

Coordinates: 51.87782°N 1.09447°W

Blackthorn
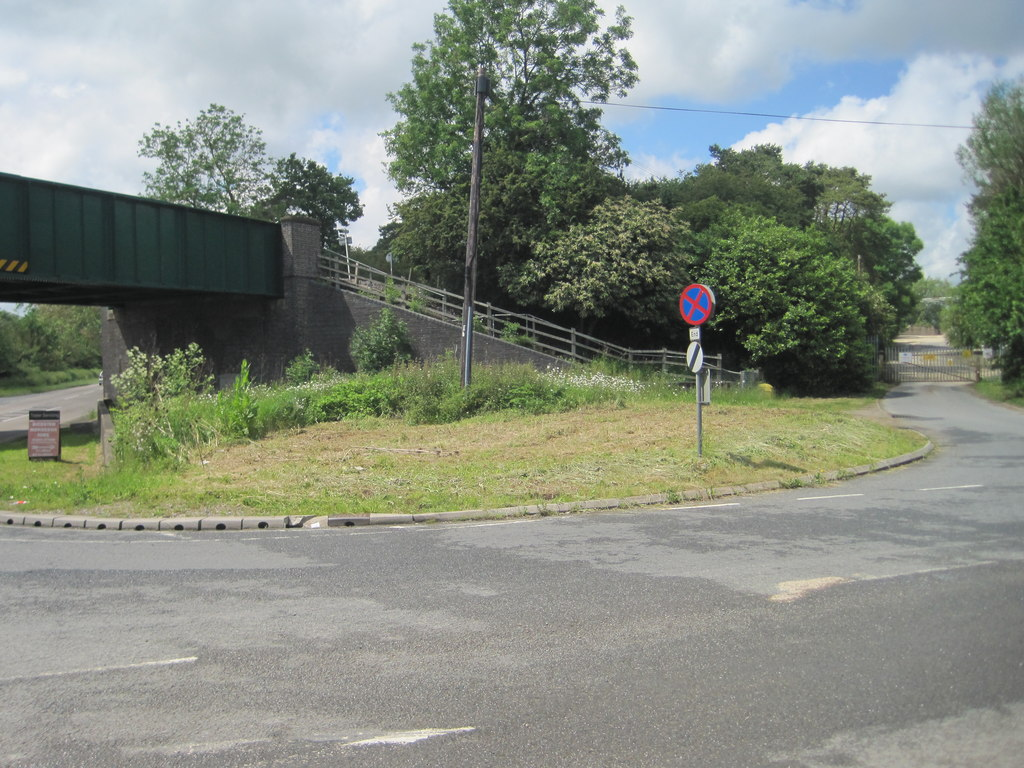

General information
- Location: Blackthorn, District of Cherwell; England
- Grid reference: SP624203
- Platforms: 2

Other information
- Status: Disused

History
- Original company: Great Western Railway
- Pre-grouping: Great Western Railway
- Post-grouping: Great Western Railway; Western Region of British Railways

Key dates
- 1 July 1910: Station opens
- 8 June 1953: Station closes to passengers
- 1955: Station closes to freight
Location

Blackthorn railway station was a railway station serving the village of Blackthorn, Oxfordshire, England. It was on what is now known as the Chiltern Main Line.

== History ==
Blackthorn was one of six new stations that the Great Western Railway provided when it opened the high-speed Bicester cut-off line between Princes Risborough and Kings Sutton in 1910.

The line became part of the Western Region of British Railways on nationalisation in 1948. British Railways closed Blackthorn station to passengers in 1953 and freight in 1955.

Preceding station	Historical railways	Following station
Bicester North; Line and station open	Great Western Railway; Bicester "cut-off"	Brill & Ludgershall; Line open, station closed
