= Ardley railway station =

Disused railway station in Ardley, Cherwell

Coordinates: 51.93854°N 1.21754°W

Ardley
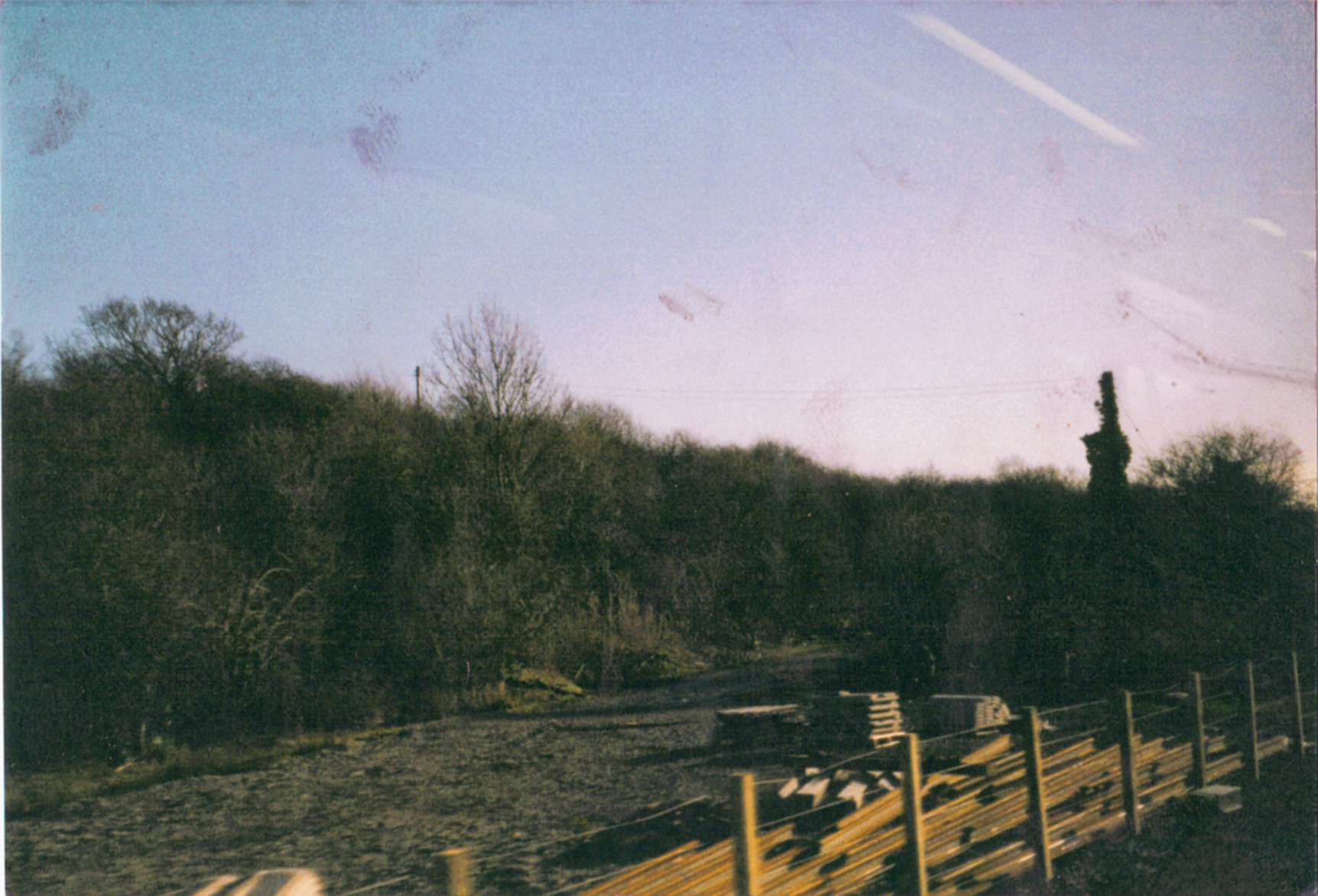
- The station site in 2001

General information
- Location: Ardley, District of Cherwell; England
- Grid reference: SP538269
- Platforms: 2

Other information
- Status: Disused

History
- Original company: Great Western Railway
- Pre-grouping: Great Western Railway
- Post-grouping: Great Western Railway

Key dates
- 1 July 1910: Station opens as Ardley
- 1 August 1955: Station renamed Ardley Halt
- 7 January 1963: Station closes
Location

Ardley railway station was a railway station serving the village of Ardley in Oxfordshire, England. It was on what is now known as the Chiltern Main Line, south of Ardley Tunnel.

== History ==
Ardley was one of six new stations that the Great Western Railway provided when it opened the high-speed Bicester cut-off line between Princes Risborough and Kings Sutton in 1910. It was the last station under the jurisdiction of the London District of the GWR on this route. The line became part of the Western Region of British Railways on nationalisation in 1948.It had sidings by 1951. British Railways closed Ardley station and sidings in 1963, but in an odd oversight, Ardley continued to appear in the weekly special traffic notices of the London Midland Region right up until 1982, nineteen years after its closure.

== The site today ==
Trains of the Chiltern Main Line pass the site.

Preceding station	Historical railways	Following station
Aynho Park; Line open, station closed	Great Western Railway; Bicester "cut-off"	Bicester North; Line and station open
