= St Michael's Church, Aynho =

Church in Aynho, Northamptonshire

Coordinates: 51°59′37″N 1°15′08″W

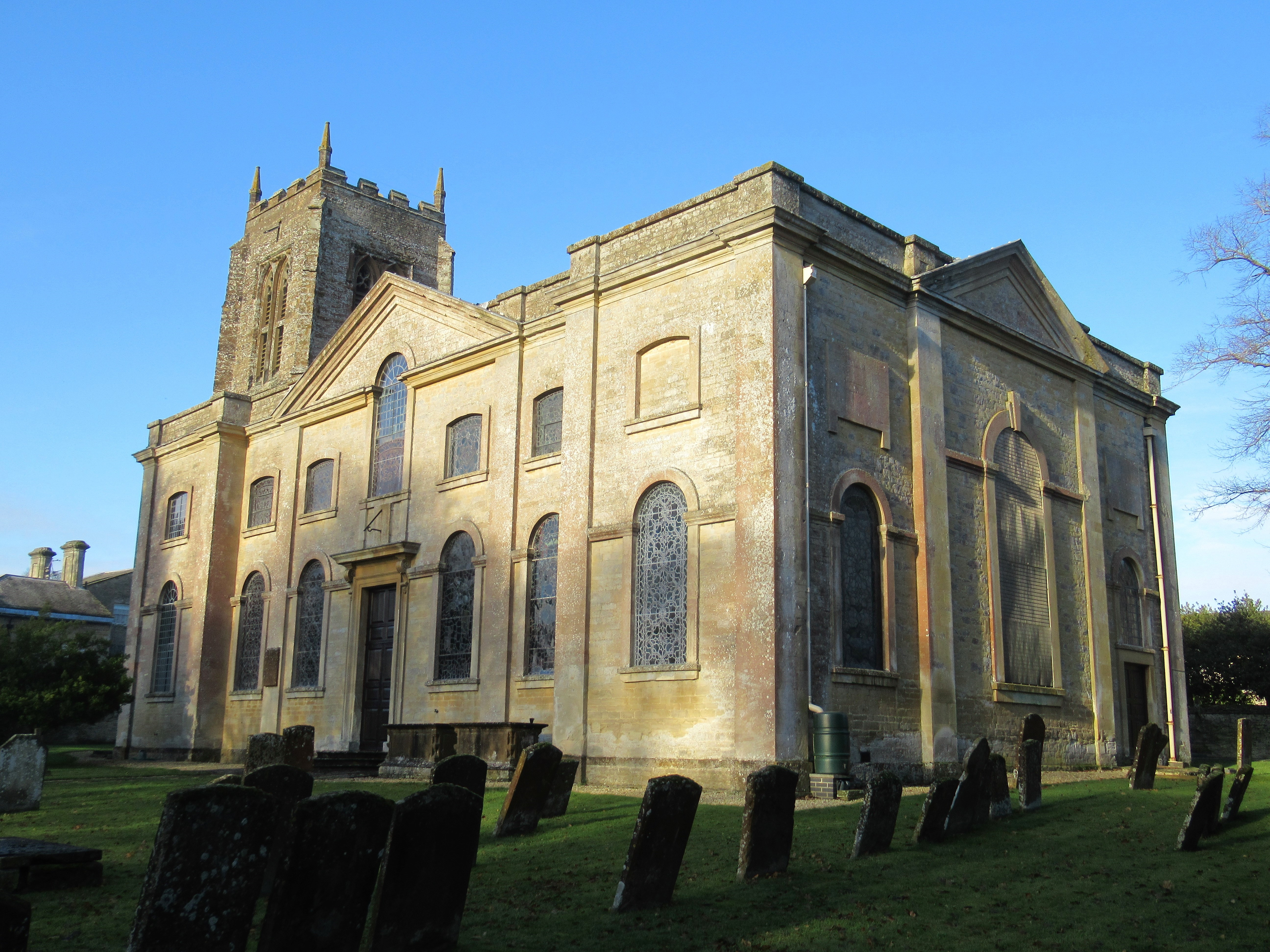
- Denomination: Church of England

History
- Dedication: St Michael

Administration
- Diocese: Peterborough
- Parish: Aynho, Northamptonshire

Clergy
- Vicar(s): Sue Cooper

St Michael's Church is a Grade I listed church in Aynho, Northamptonshire.

== History ==
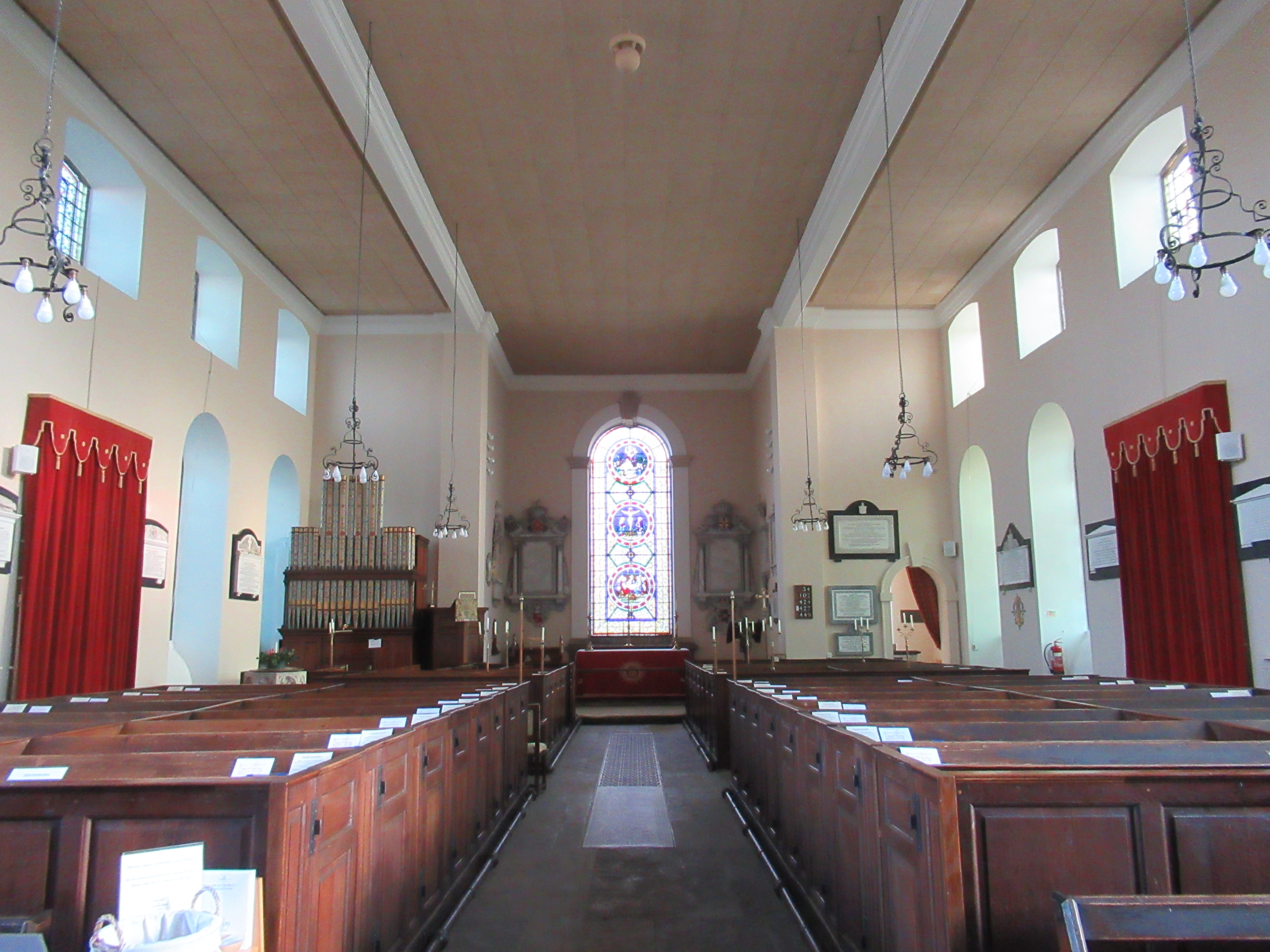
Church interior

The church has a late medieval tower. The rest of the church was rebuilt after the original chancel and nave were demolished in 1723. Edward Wing carried out the rebuilding.

The church interior is Georgian but with Victorian elements in the grisaille patterned windows and many of the other furnishings.

The church is home to three other windows. Thomas Willement designed the eastern window which depicts three medallion scenes. C.E. Kempe designed the windows on the southern side which feature Archangel Michael and the dragon and the Annunciation.

The church has a couple of 18th-century tablets on the sanctuary walls.
