= Aynho =

Village in Northamptonshire, England

Coordinates: 52.00°N 1.25°W

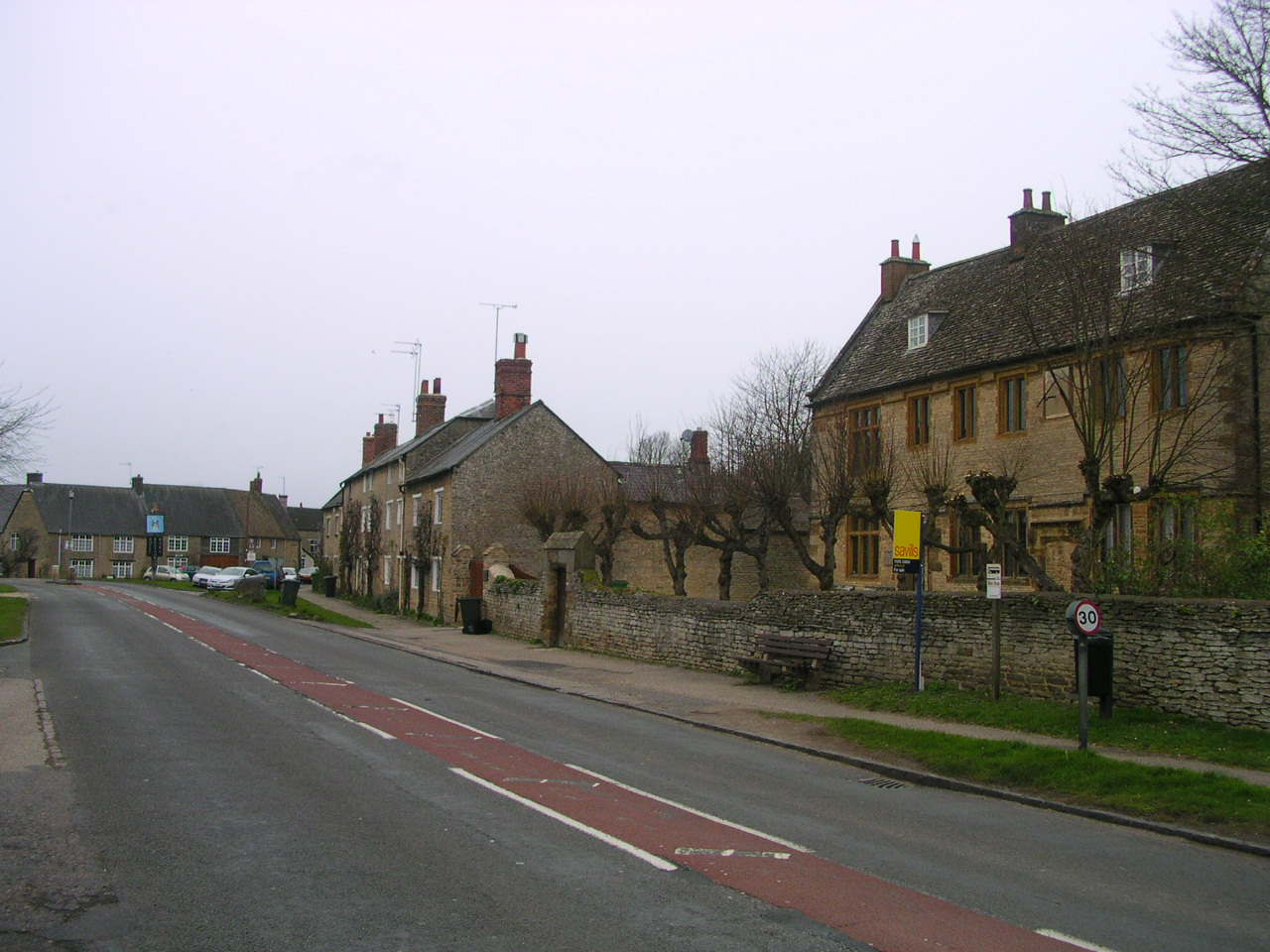

- Location within Northamptonshire
- Population: 632 (2001 census); 659 (2011 census.)
- OS grid reference: SP5133
- Civil parish: Aynho
- Unitary authority: West Northamptonshire
- Ceremonial county: Northamptonshire
- Region: East Midlands
- Country: England
- Sovereign state: United Kingdom
- Post town: Banbury
- Postcode district: OX17
- Dialling code: 01869
- Police: Northamptonshire
- Fire: Northamptonshire
- Ambulance: East Midlands
- UK Parliament: South Northamptonshire

Aynho (/ˈeɪnhoʊ/, formerly spelt Aynhoe) is a village and civil parish in West Northamptonshire, England, on the edge of the Cherwell valley 6 miles (9.7 km) south-east of the north Oxfordshire town of Banbury and 7 miles (11 km) southwest of Brackley.

Along with its neighbour Croughton 2 miles (3.2 km) to the east, it is one of the two southernmost villages in Northamptonshire.

It is the southernmost settlement in Northamptonshire and indeed the entire English East Midlands region.

== History ==
Aynho was founded in Anglo-Saxon times. The toponym is derived from Aienho, Old English for a spring, grove or hill. The circular village was surrounded by a defensive wall, parts of which can still be seen.

In the 11th century Asgar, a Saxon thegn and standard bearer to Edward the Confessor owned the manor of Aynho. After the Norman conquest of England he was forced to cede the manor to Geoffrey de Mandeville, whose family retained it for several generations. Later the manor passed through the Clavering, Neville, Fitzalan, Shakerley, Tracy and Marmion families. Late in the 16th century Aynhoe Park was sold to Richard Cartwright (born 1563, a barrister and member of the Inner Temple, from a Cheshire family) who moved to Aynho in 1616. It then remained in the Cartwright Family for over three hundred years.

Late in the 12th century Roger and Alice FitzRichard founded the Hospital of Saints James and John in Aynho to care for the poor, the sick and the infirm. Their son Robert FitzRoger and subsequent benefactors increased the endowments of the hospital but in the 15th century it declined. In 1483 the 16th Earl of Arundel granted the hospital's advowson and patronage to William Waynflete, Bishop of Winchester. In 1458 Waynflete had founded Magdalen College, Oxford and in 1485 he granted the hospital to the college. At some time thereafter the hospital seems to have become a private house.

By the 19th century, the population was large for a parish of around 2500 acres, at 623 in 1801 and 719 in 1821. From the time of the Napoleonic Wars onwards, however, poverty increased and migrants began to leave the village in 1829 — up to 100 by 1833, and a further 37 in 1836. By the time migration from the village began to diminish in 1847, 243 residents of the parish had emigrated. Many of these, including the George, Terry, and Eely families, settled in Oswego County, New York, particularly around Richland.

== Notable buildings ==
The village church of Saint Michael has a 14th-century Decorated Gothic tower. The rest of the church was demolished in 1723 and rebuilt over the next two years in neoclassical style. The interior retains its Georgian pulpit, box pews and west gallery.

A Tudor yeoman's house was turned into a free Grammar School founded in 1654 by John Cartwright, and later became the dower house of the Manor of Aynhoe Park on the southern edge of the village.

Aynho almshouses were built in 1822.

== Transport history ==
The Oxford Canal was built through the western part of the parish in 1787. Aynho Wharf, 1 mile (1.6 km) west of the village centre, is on the Aynho – Deddington road.

Construction of the Oxford and Rugby Railway between Oxford and Banbury began in 1845. By the time the line opened in 1850 the Great Western Railway had taken it over. Aynho for Deddington railway station was close to Aynho Wharf of the earlier constructed Oxford Canal on the Aynho to Deddington road, which thereafter became known as Station Road.

In 1910 the GWR completed the Bicester cut-off line, linking it with the Oxford and Rugby Railway at Aynho Junction, a new flying junction built in the parish. The company provided a second station, Aynho Park railway station, on the new line 130 yards (120 m) east of the existing station. British Railways closed Aynho Park in 1963 and Aynho for Deddington in 1964. Aynho Junction is now used by Chiltern Railways, CrossCountry, Great Western Railway and freight traffic. As part of Chiltern's Evergreen 3, the junction was relaid and upgraded for higher speeds and a new panel was fitted to Banbury South signal box.

The M40 motorway now runs close to the west of the village with the nearest access at junction 10, with the A43 trunk road about 3 1/2 miles (5.6 km) south.

== Notable residents ==
Residents have included the 17th-century politician Sir Ralph Winwood, the 19th-century Irish-based judge Charles Burton, the 19th- and 20th-century architect Philip Speakman Webb and the 20th-century mathematician Mary Cartwright.

== Amenities ==
Aynho has a hotel and restaurant in the village, the Cartwright, named after the family that had until 1954 owned Aynhoe Park. About half a mile outside the village, there is a public house, the Great Western Arms, controlled since 2009 by the Hook Norton Brewery.

== See also ==
- History of Banbury, Oxfordshire
