= Bicester North railway station =

Railway station in Oxfordshire, England

Bicester North
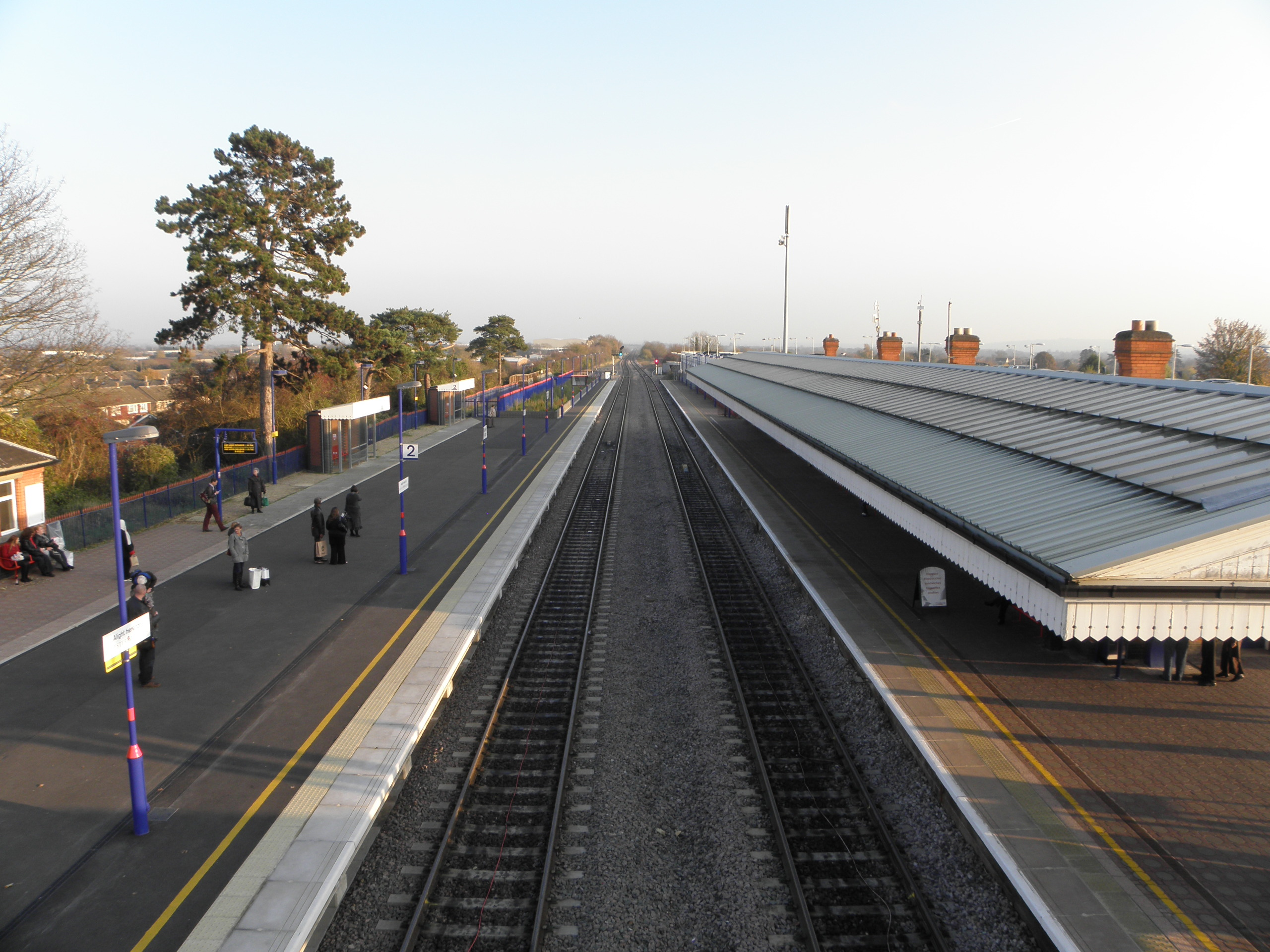
- The station in 2011, after completion of widening work on the southbound platform

General information
- Location: Bicester, District of Cherwell, England
- Coordinates: 51.9035°N 1.1500°W
- Grid reference: SP585231
- Managed by: Chiltern Railways
- Platforms: 2

Other information
- Station code: BCS
- Classification: DfT category D

History
- Opened: 1 July 1910
- Original company: Great Western Railway
- Pre-grouping: Great Western Railway
- Post-grouping: Great Western Railway

Passengers
- 2020/21: ▼0.148 million
- Interchange: ▼3,509
- 2021/22: ▲0.512 million
- Interchange: ▲19,850
- 2022/23: ▲0.633 million
- Interchange: ▼18,563
- 2023/24: ▲0.758 million
- Interchange: ▼3,984
- 2024/25: ▲0.823 million
- Interchange: ▲4,264
Location
Notes
- Passenger statistics from the Office of Rail and Road

Bicester North (/ˈbɪstər/ BIST-ər) is a station on the Chiltern Main Line, one of two serving the market town of Bicester, in Oxfordshire, England; the other is Bicester Village. Services operated by Chiltern Railways run south to London Marylebone and north to Banbury, Birmingham Snow Hill and Stratford-upon-Avon.

== History ==
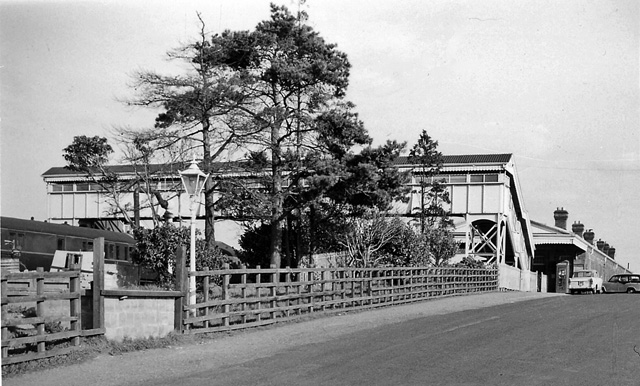
The station entrance in 1961

The Bicester cut-off, between Ashendon Junction and Aynho Junction, was opened in 1910; it was the last main line stretch of route to be completed in Great Britain until the 1980s. This provided a shortening of the London-to-Birmingham Great Western Railway (GWR) railway line and gave Bicester a station with direct London trains for the first time.

The station was transferred from the Western Region of British Rail to the London Midland Region on 24 March 1974.

In 2010, the down northbound line through the station was realigned for higher speeds, as part of the Evergreen 3 project. In 2011, the up platform was widened, using the trackbed of the former through lines.

Improvements to the station's car park began in summer 2026, as part of a £3.8 million project.

== Services ==
Services are operated by Chiltern Railways, which provides the following general Monday-to-Friday off-peak service in trains per hour (tph):

- 2 tph to London Marylebone, typically calling at Haddenham & Thame Parkway (once per hour) and High Wycombe only
- 1 tph to Birmingham Moor Street
- 1 tph to Banbury, with alternate services extending to Birmingham Snow Hill and at peak times.

| Preceding station | National Rail | Following station |
|---|---|---|
| High Wycombe | Chiltern Railways Chiltern Main Line | Kings Sutton |
| Haddenham & Thame Parkway | Chiltern Railways Chiltern Main Line | Banbury |
| | Historical railways | |
| Ardley; Line open, station closed | Great Western Railway; Bicester "cut-off" | Blackthorn; Line open, station closed |

== Bibliography ==
- MacDermot, E.T. (1931). History of the Great Western Railway. Vol. II (1st ed.). Paddington: Great Western Railway.
- Mitchell, Vic; Smith, Keith (September 2002). Princes Risborough to Banbury. Western Main Lines. Midhurst: Middleton Press. ISBN 1-901706-85-0.
