= Aynho Park railway station =

Former railway station in Northamptonshire, England

Aynho Park
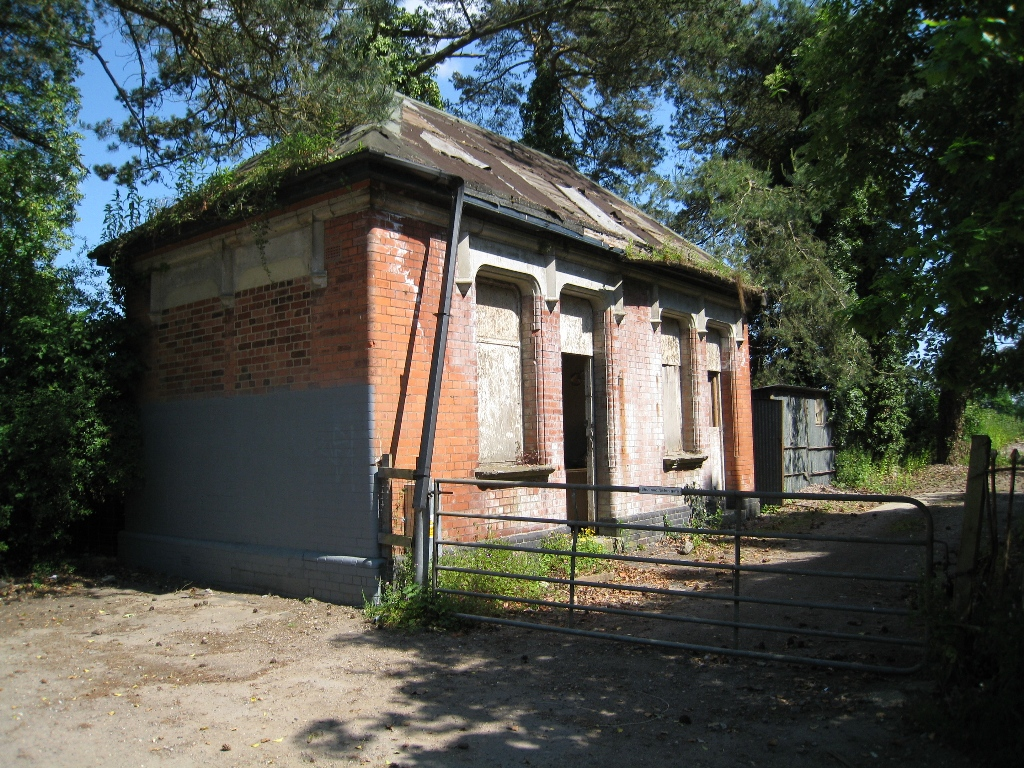
- Street-level building of the former station in May 2009, seen from the B4031 road. The path on the right leads up to the site of the former up platform.

General information
- Location: Aynho, West Northamptonshire, England
- Coordinates: 51.98716°N 1.27284°W
- Grid reference: SP500323
- Platforms: 2

Other information
- Status: Disused

History
- Opened: 1 July 1910
- Closed: 7 January 1963
- Original company: Great Western Railway
- Pre-grouping: Great Western Railway
- Post-grouping: Great Western Railway, Western Region of British Railways
Location

Aynho Park was a railway station that served the village of Aynho, in Northamptonshire, England, between 1910 and 1963. It was a stop on what is now known as the Chiltern Main Line.

== History ==
Aynho Park was the northernmost of six new stations that the Great Western Railway provided when it opened the high-speed Bicester cut-off line between Ashendon Junction and Aynho Junction for passengers on 1 July 1910.

The line became part of the Western Region of British Railways on nationalisation in 1948. British Railways closed the station in 1963.

| Preceding station | Historical railways | Following station |
|---|---|---|
| King's Sutton; Line and station open | Great Western Railway; Bicester "cut-off" | Ardley; Line open, station closed |

== The site today ==
A platform, with the brick entrance for steps up to it, are extant. Trains on the Chiltern Main Line pass through the station site.
