= Banbury railway station =

Railway station in Oxfordshire, England

Coordinates: 52.060°N 1.328°W

Banbury
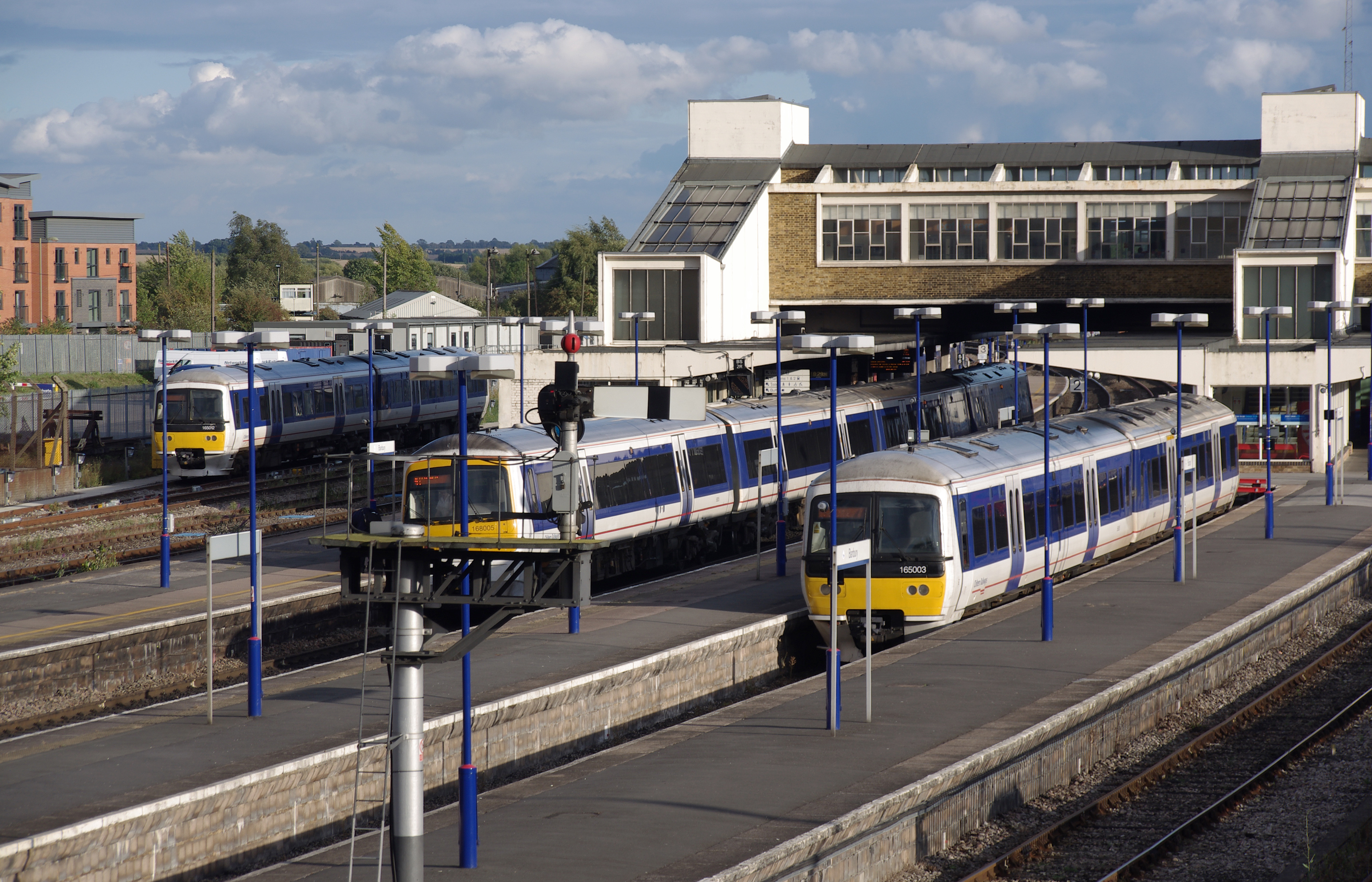
- The north end of Banbury station in 2011

General information
- Location: Banbury, District of Cherwell; England
- Grid reference: SP462404
- Manager: Chiltern Railways
- Platforms: 4

Other information
- Station code: BAN
- Classification: DfT category C1

History
- Original company: Great Western Railway
- Pre-grouping: Great Western Railway
- Post-grouping: Great Western Railway

Key dates
- 2 September 1850: Opened as Banbury
- After July 1938: Renamed Banbury General
- 1958: Rebuilt by British Railways
- After 1961: Renamed Banbury

Passengers
- 2020/21: ▼0.631 million
- Interchange: ▼50,400
- 2021/22: ▲1.885 million
- Interchange: ▲0.169 million
- 2022/23: ▼1.813 million
- Interchange: ▲0.235 million
- 2023/24: ▲1.895 million
- Interchange: ▼0.204 million
- 2024/25: ▲2.270 million
- Interchange: ▲0.220 million
Location
Notes
- Passenger statistics from the Office of Rail and Road

Banbury railway station serves the historic market town of Banbury in Oxfordshire, England. The station is a stop on the Chiltern Main Line; it is operated by Chiltern Railways and has four platforms in use.

== History ==
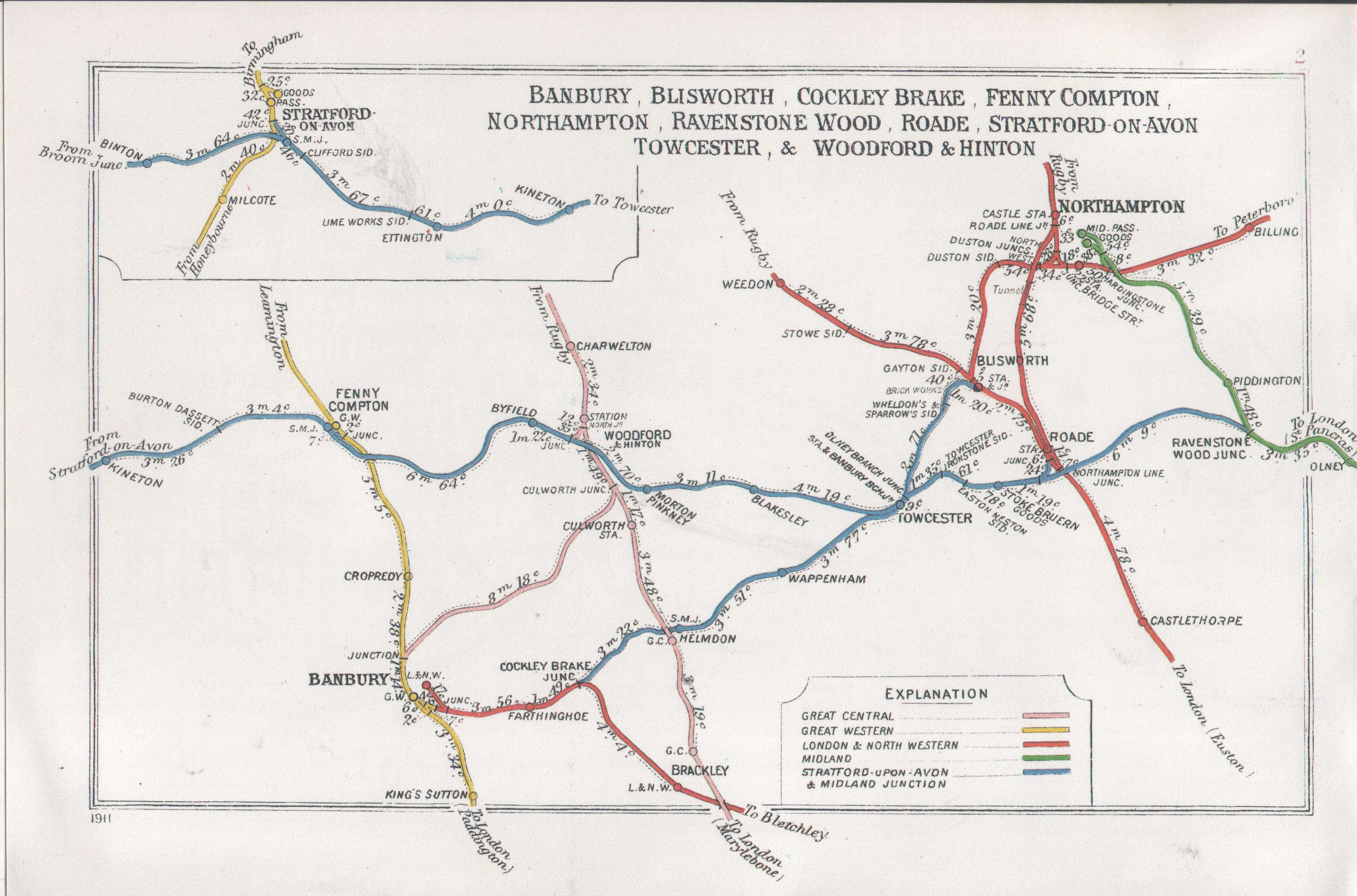
A 1911 Railway Clearing House map of railways in the vicinity of Banbury (lower left; Banbury Bridge Street is shown in yellow labelled "G.W.")

Banbury Bridge Street station opened on 2 September 1850, some four months after the Buckinghamshire Railway (L&NWR) opened its Banbury Merton Street terminus. When meadows and the recently disused racecourse at Grimsbury were sold to the Great Western Railway (GWR) in about 1850, the owner also sold the other part of his land, north of the Middleton road to the Banbury Freehold Land Society; this was financially backed by Cobb's Bank, on which to build middle-class houses, but development was slow at the time and some plots were never built upon.

The station was going to be part of the GWR's Oxford and Rugby Railway, before the problems with changing gauges at Rugby prevented it. The 24-mile (39 km) single track extension from Oxford to Banbury did open. At first, Banbury was just a single platform through station (works were continuing to Birmingham); however, the popularity of the line meant that the route was soon double tracked barely two years later and the station was given an extra platform in an up and down configuration. By 1882, an extra up goods line had been laid on the east side of the station, outside the train shed, together with a transfer line to the LNWR route.

In 1903, Banbury had south and north bays cut into the up platform, along with an extra bay on the downside at the north end. There was a down goods loop north of the station; all of this was to cope with traffic from the Great Central Main Line, which joined at Banbury North Junction in 1900. The inclusion of terminating bays and goods loops reflected Banbury's increasing strategic position in the national network. In 1904, the refreshment rooms were rebuilt to the designs of Percy Emerson Culverhouse. The station was rebuilt into its present form in 1958.

Banbury was once a junction for the line to Buckingham, which closed in the 1960s. There was also another station nearby at Banbury Merton Street. Banbury Bridge Street station occupied one of the most strategic and important locations in the entire rail network in Britain. For example:

- The Aberdeen to Penzance express used the Woodford Halse branch of the GCR through Banbury as part of its journey
- The Ports to Ports Express between the North-East (Newcastle, Middlesbrough) and South Wales (Cardiff, Newport) used the Great Central Railway branch line
- The Banbury and Cheltenham Direct Railway passed through Banbury, as well as Newcastle — Bournemouth, Newcastle — Southampton, the York — Swindon sleeper and Bournemouth — Birkenhead Woodside/Manchester Piccadilly services.

Most cross-country services in Britain passed through Banbury, which helped the growth of the town and its cattle market.

After nationalisation in 1948, the station was renamed Banbury General to distinguish it from Banbury Merton Street station. Merton Street was closed in 1966, and the suffix was officially discontinued by 1974, although it remained on tickets until the Edmondson type ticket machines were replaced in the early 1980s.

Both Banbury South and North signal boxes were demolished in mid-2016: the South box on 10 August and the North box on 8 October. Tours of the North box were run between 10 August and 2 October with commemorative tickets issued. The lever frames from the North box were moved to Ironbridge to be preserved. The nameboards from both boxes were presented by Network Rail to the Great Western Trust at Didcot Railway Centre where one of them is on display in The Signalling Centre.

The current station is on the site of the Great Western Railway line that opened to Banbury in 1850. The original station's overall roof survived until 1953, five years before a rebuild in 1958. The rebuilding of the station was delayed due to the Second World War and could have been based on the GWR's new station at Leamington Spa, which was finished just before war commenced. The new station of 1958 was designed by Howard Cavanagh.

Passenger traffic at Banbury has grown rapidly; between 2003 and 2010, the number of passengers using the station increased by 85%.

== Layout ==
Map of the platforms at Banbury station, before the 2016 alterations

After the rebuilding of the station in 1956–58, there were six numbered platforms. These were formed into two islands: the western one having two through tracks and a single bay at its northern end, whilst the eastern island had a single through platform, but two bays, one at each end. The two islands were connected to each other and to the station entrance hall, by a footbridge.

At that time, the three through platforms were numbered 1, 3 and 4 from west to east, whilst the three bays were numbered 2, 5 and 6. All but one have since been redesignated; the present-day platform 2 was formerly platform 3, whilst the unnumbered bay at its northern end was originally platform 2, and present-day platforms 3 and 4 were formerly platforms 4 and 5 respectively. Platform 6, a bay platform at the southern end of the present platform 3, has lost both its track and its number, although was in use as Platform 4 until 2016.

The present station has four numbered platforms, numbered 1 to 4 from west to east, grouped as two island platforms:

- Platform 1 is a through platform used as a bay by Chiltern Railways for terminating services to and from London Marylebone. All terminating trains at this platform travel a short distance up the line before reversing back to the same platform and boarding outbound passengers, unless a train has since occupied the platform, which then means the train reverses to platform 3 to board passengers. Platform 1 is also used in emergencies if one of the others is out of use.
- Platform 2 is for Chiltern services north to Birmingham Moor Street/Snow Hill and Stourport Junction, and CrossCountry services to Birmingham New Street, Manchester Piccadilly and Newcastle.
- Platform 3 is for Chiltern services to London via Bicester, and CrossCountry services to Oxford, Reading, Southampton and Bournemouth.
- Platform 4 is a through platform used as a bay by Great Western Railway's terminating local trains to Didcot Parkway and commuter trains beyond to Reading and London Paddington. An unnumbered bay platform (known as Platform 2 Bay) was used by terminating Chiltern services to and from Birmingham and Stratford until it was filled in during August 2016. Freight loops serve as main through lines for non-stopping freight trains. Most passenger services passing Banbury stop at the station and heritage steam locomotives stop here to fill up with water.

Many redundant loops and sidings surround the station; most of these were for goods services stopping at Banbury, which have all disappeared. Two goods loops survive to allow the stoppage of goods trains for the uninterrupted passage of passenger trains.

Two new lower-quadrant semaphore signals were installed in late 2010, to allow passenger trains in platforms 1 and 2 to depart in the up direction. Their numbers were BS27 and BS33, and they were controlled from Banbury South signal box.

A nine-day long blockade to resignal and complete alterations to the track layout at the station layout began on 30 July 2016. Both remaining manual signal boxes were closed with new multiple aspect signalling commissioned and all lines through the station coming under the control of the West Midlands Signalling Centre at Saltley.

== Services ==
Services at Banbury are provided by three train operating companies:

- Chiltern Railways provides most trains to Banbury; their weekday off-peak service consists of:
  - 2 trains per hour to London Marylebone
  - 2 trains per hour to Birmingham Moor Street, of which one continues to Birmingham Snow Hill
- Great Western Railway operates local services from Didcot Parkway, which operate Mondays to Saturdays only.
- CrossCountry operates services between Manchester Piccadilly, Birmingham New Street, Reading, Southampton (Central and Airport Parkway), and Bournemouth.

Preceding station	National Rail	Following station
Leamington Spa	Chiltern Railways; London to Birmingham	Kings Sutton
Leamington Spa	Chiltern Railways; Birmingham to Oxford	Oxford or Kings Sutton
Leamington Spa	Chiltern Railways; Chiltern Main Line fast services	Bicester North or London Marylebone
Leamington Spa	CrossCountry; Manchester to Bournemouth	Oxford
Leamington Spa	CrossCountry; Newcastle to Reading	Oxford
Terminus	Great Western Railway; Cherwell Valley Line	Kings Sutton
	Historical railways	
Cropredy; Line open, station closed	Great Western Railway; Oxford and Rugby Railway	Kings Sutton; Line and station open
	Disused railways	
Chalcombe Road Halt; Line and station closed	Great Central Railway; Banbury branch	Terminus

== Incidents ==
=== 2008 train fire ===
On 14 March 2008, a CrossCountry Voyager forming the 16:25 service to Derby had a minor fire in the air vents while standing at platform 2. Passengers in both trains at the station and the station itself were evacuated. Fire crews arrived and the fire was extinguished; there were no reported deaths or injuries from the blaze.

=== 2015 Harbury Tunnel landslip ===
Between 31 January and 13 March 2015, all services north of Banbury were suspended and replaced by buses due to a major landslide at Harbury Tunnel, north of Fenny Compton. Over 100,000 tons of earth and rock subsided on the western side of the line during ongoing work to stabilise the cutting, which had been a known problem area for some years (and had suffered a similar but smaller collapse in February 2014). Remedial work was carried out to remove more than 350,000 tons of material, reprofile the cutting walls and improve drainage. In the meantime, all Chiltern services from London and all CrossCountry services from Reading and the South Coast terminated at Banbury; a rail replacement bus service ran to Leamington Spa for onward connections to Birmingham New Street, Manchester Piccadilly, the East Midlands and the North East. Network Rail reopened the line on 13 March 2015, three weeks earlier than originally estimated.

== See also ==
- History of Banbury, Oxfordshire
