= Shipton-on-Cherwell =

Village in Oxfordshire, England

Coordinates: 51.849°N 1.305°W

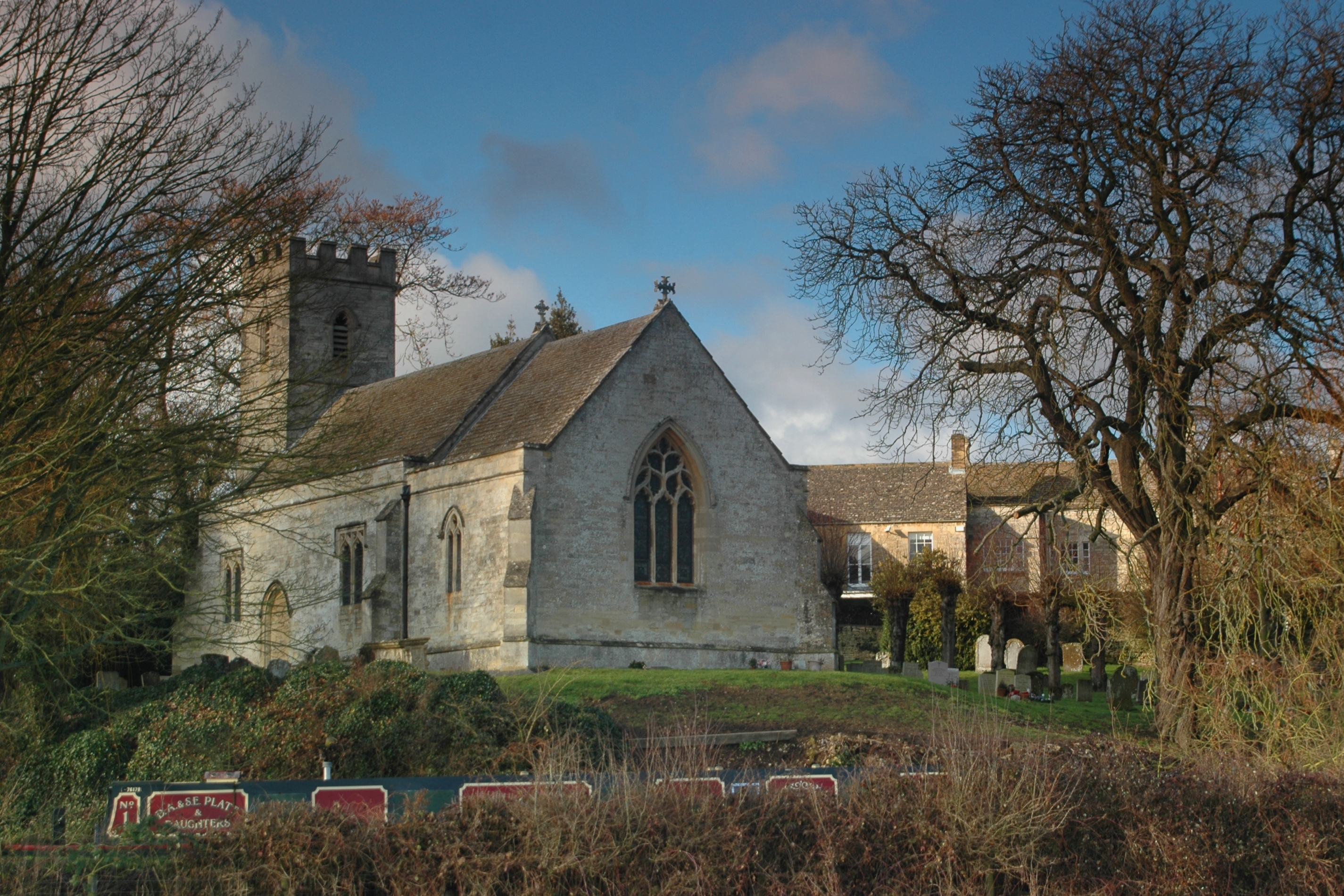
- Holy Cross parish church overlooking the Oxford Canal

- Location within Oxfordshire
- OS grid reference: SP4816
- Civil parish: Shipton-on-Cherwell and Thrupp
- District: Cherwell
- Shire county: Oxfordshire
- Region: South East
- Country: England
- Sovereign state: United Kingdom
- Post town: Kidlington
- Postcode district: OX5
- Dialling code: 01865
- Police: Thames Valley
- Fire: Oxfordshire
- Ambulance: South Central
- UK Parliament: Bicester and Woodstock

Shipton-on-Cherwell is a village in the civil parish of Shipton-on-Cherwell and Thrupp, in the Cherwell district, in the county of Oxfordshire, England. It is on the River Cherwell about 2 miles (3 km) north of Kidlington in Oxfordshire, England.

== Manor ==
The earliest known record of Shipton-on-Cherwell is from 1005, when an estate at Shipton was granted to the Benedictine Eynsham Abbey. Shortly before or after the Norman Conquest of England an estate of five hides at Shipton seems to have been transferred from Eynsham to another Benedictine religious house, Evesham Abbey. However, after the death of Evesham's Abbot Æthelwig in 1077 or 1078 William of Normandy's half-brother Odo, Bishop of Bayeux took Shipton from Æthelwig's successor Walter. By the time of the Domesday Book in 1086, Odo had only 2 1/2 hides at Shipton and these were let to Ilbert de Lacy. Hugh de Grandmesnil held the other 2 1/2 hides and it is not clear whether the estate had been divided before or after the Conquest.

Shipton Manor House was built in the 16th or 17th century. William Turner lived there from 1804 with his uncle, also William Turner. He was married there in 1824 and is buried in the churchyard with his wife. In 1896 a memorial chancel screen was installed in the church, with a brass plaque reading "Erected in memory of William Turner of Oxford, Water Colour Painter and architect of this church." In the 20th century Richard Branson owned the manor house and turned it into The Manor Studio, a recording studio for Virgin Records. Albums recorded there included Tubular Bells by Mike Oldfield in 1972–73 and Born Again by Black Sabbath in 1983. In 1995 it was closed as a recording studio by EMI, by then the owner of Virgin Records. It is now the country home of the Marquess of Headfort.

== Parish church ==
Shipton had a parish church by the latter part of the 12th century, which seems to have been enlarged in the 13th century and received new windows in the 14th century. It was demolished in 1831 and replaced by a new Georgian Gothic Revival Church of England parish church designed by the artist William Turner, who lived at the manor house. Some original materials from the original church were reused. Crossley and Elrington state that this includes the north porch, which Sherwood and Pevsner had earlier dismissed as "free and flimsy Georgian Gothick". Holy Cross was restored in 1869 under the direction of the Gothic Revival architect Charles Buckeridge.

The belltower has only two bells. They were cast in the middle of the 16th century and presumably came from the original church. The original dedication of the 12th-century church was to the Holy Cross. By 1786, the dedication had been changed to Saint Mary, and by 1851 it had been changed to Saint Jerome. By 1892, the church was finally restored to its original dedication of Holy Cross. The parish is now part of the Benefice of Blenheim, which also includes Begbroke, Bladon, Woodstock and Yarnton.

== Economic history ==
In 1787, the Oxford Canal was extended southwards from Northbrook Lock (north of Tackley) towards Oxford. A wharf was built at Shipton, where the canal passes between the River Cherwell and the village. The Oxford and Rugby Railway between Oxford and Banbury was built past the village in 1848–49 but the nearest station provided was Bletchington, which was actually at the hamlet of Enslow 1 mile (1.6 km) north of Shipton. The Shipton-on-Cherwell train crash was a major rail accident on the Great Western Railway that occurred on 24 December 1874, killing 34 people. In 1890 the Woodstock Railway opened a branch line between Kidlington and Blenheim and Woodstock. The line was operated by the Great Western Railway, which opened Shipton-on-Cherwell Halt beside the line's bridge over the main Banbury Road. British Railways closed the branch line and halt in 1954. BR also closed Bletchington and Kidlington stations in 1964. The nearest railway station now is Tackley, 2.5 miles (4 km) north of Shipton.

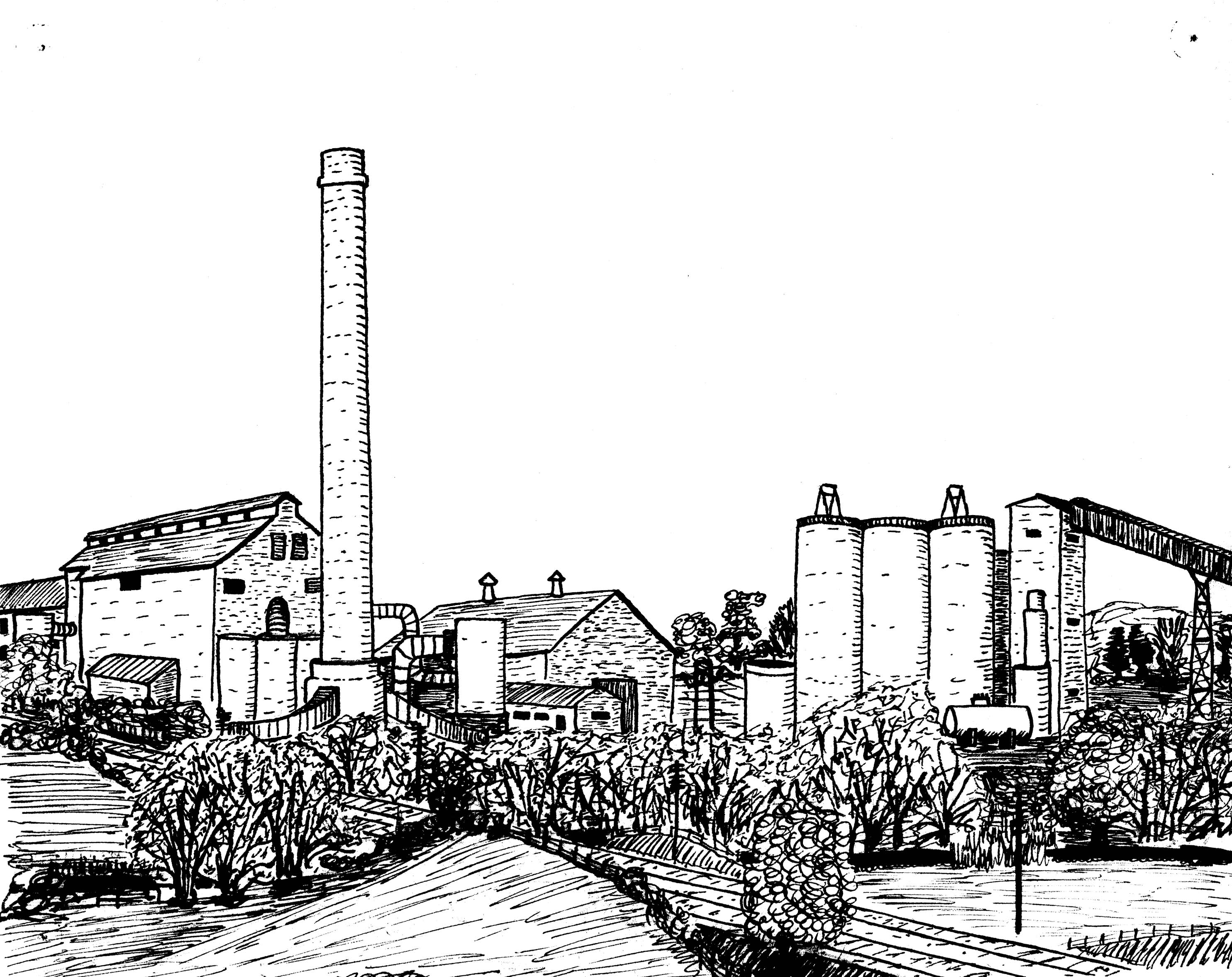
Shipton Cement Works in 1972

In the 1920s, the Oxford and Shipton Cement Company built a cement works beside the main railway line and began quarrying limestone from the hillside between the Woodstock branch line and Bunker's Hill. The quarry was bought by Alpha Cement in 1934 which became part of Associated Portland Cement in 1938, which in turn became Blue Circle Industries in 1978. Towards the end of the 20th century the quarry ceased production and was sold to the Kilbride Group, which applied unsuccessfully to redevelop it as an eco-town. The quarry is protected as a Site of Special Scientific Interest because it is important for Jurassic fossils, particularly crocodiles. Since quarrying ceased, the site has also become important for wildlife. Birds including turtle dove, little ringed plover, Cetti's warbler and peregrine falcon breed in the quarry. A lake has formed in the bottom of the quarry, attracting birds including green sandpiper, jack snipe, little grebe and common pochard to overwinter there. The site also attracts invertebrates including damselflies.

In 1951 the parish had a population of 264. On 1 April 1955 the parish was abolished and merged with Thrup to form "Shipton on Cherwell and Thrup".

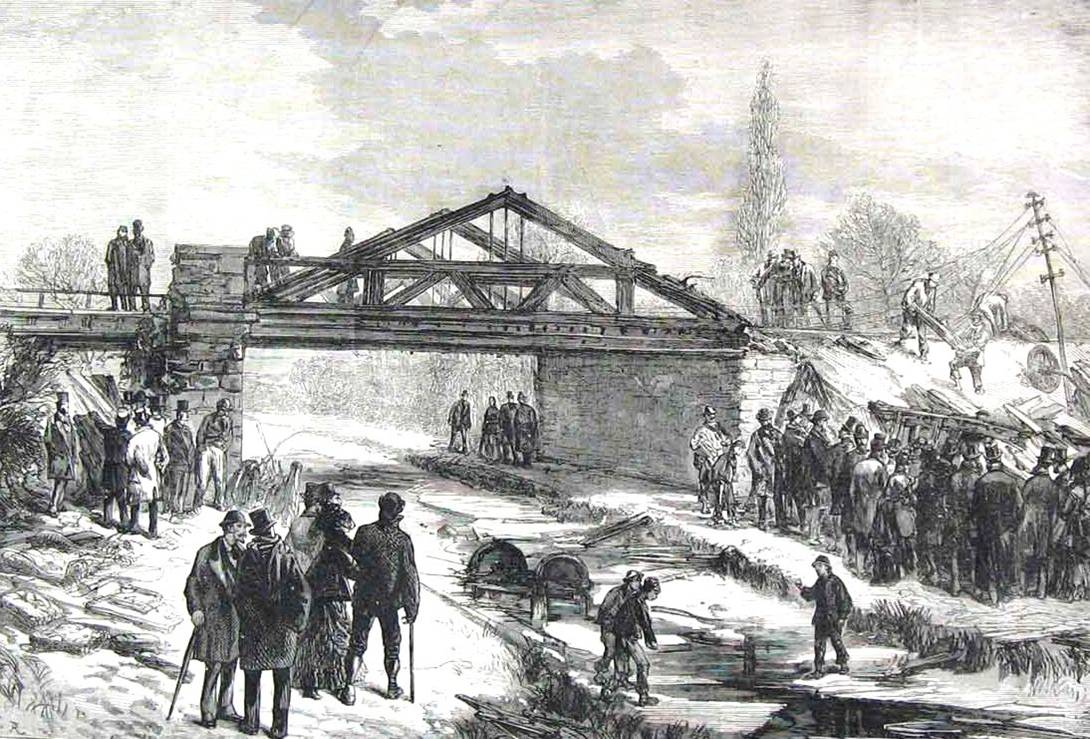
Shipton-on-Cherwell train crash, 1874

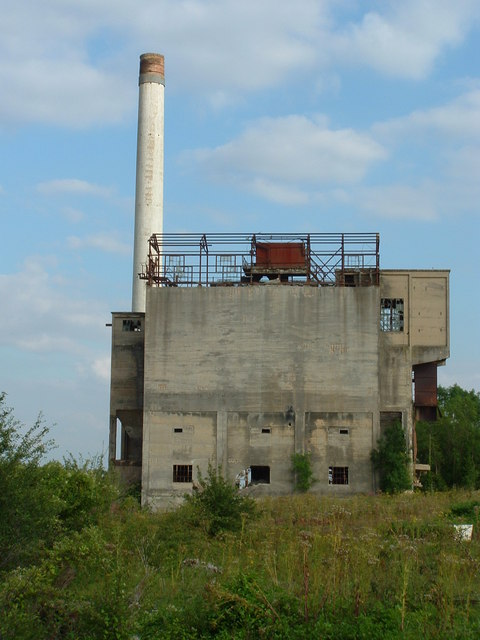
Shipton cement works in 2005

== Sources ==
- Compton, Hugh J. (1976). The Oxford Canal. Newton Abbot: David & Charles. ISBN 0-7153-7238-6.
- Crossley, Alan; Elrington, C.R., eds. (1990). "Shipton-on-Cherwell". A History of the County of Oxford. Victoria County History. Vol. 12: Wootton Hundred (South) including Woodstock. London: Oxford University Press for the Institute of Historical Research. pp. 254–267. ISBN 978-0-19722-774-9.
- Sherwood, Jennifer; Pevsner, Nikolaus (1974). Oxfordshire. The Buildings of England. Harmondsworth: Penguin Books. pp. 757–758. ISBN 0-14-071045-0.
- Waters, Laurence (1991). Oxfordshire Railways in Old Photographs A Second Selection. Stroud: Alan Sutton Publishing. pp. 124–126. ISBN 0-86299-852-2.
