= Bletchingdon =

Village in Oxfordshire, England

Coordinates: 51.855°N 1.272°W

Bletchingdon: Bletch
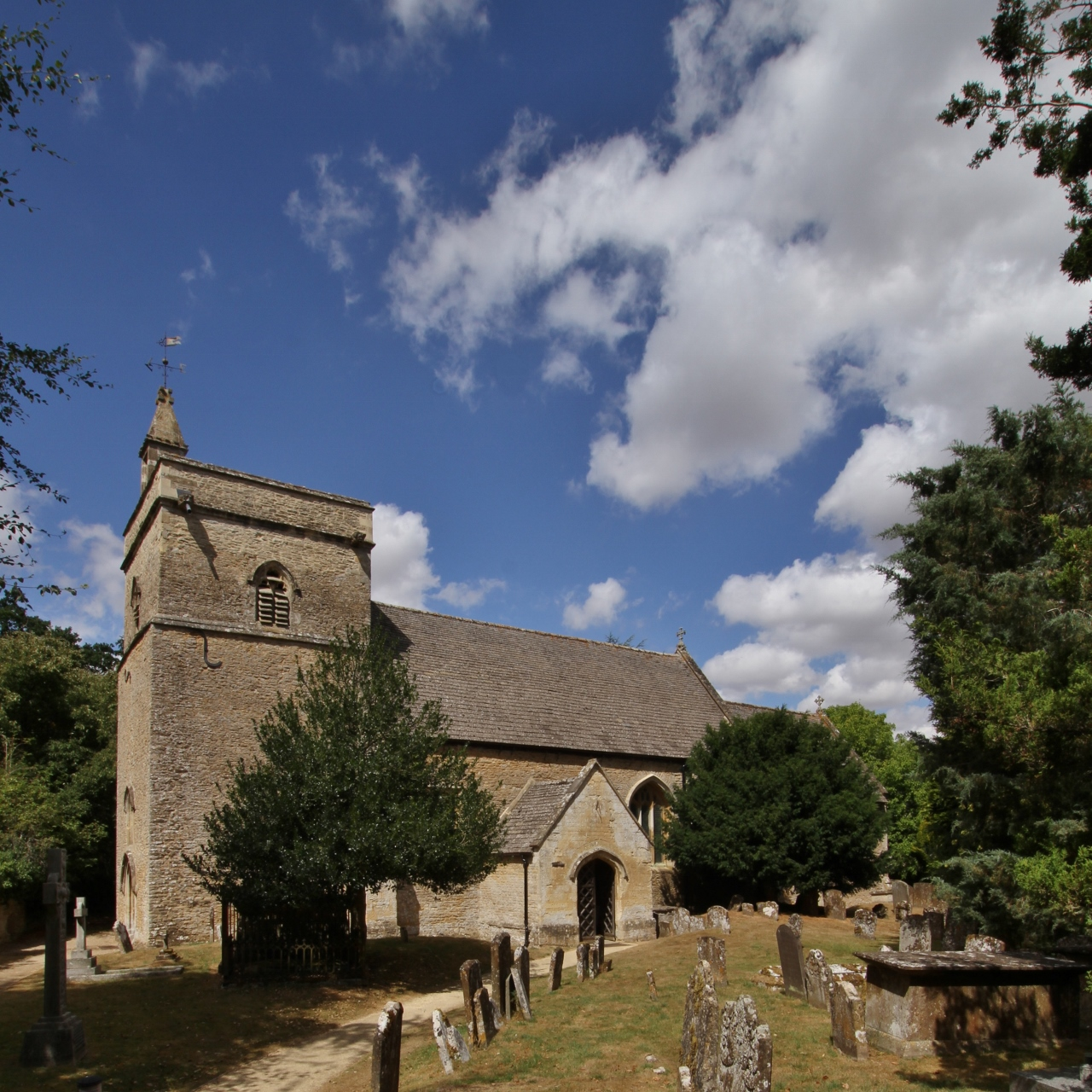
- St Giles' parish church

- Location within Oxfordshire
- Area: 10.75 km^{2} (4.15 sq mi)
- Population: 910 (2011 Census)
  - Density: 85/km^{2} (220/sq mi)
- OS grid reference: SP5017
- Civil parish: Bletchingdon
- District: Cherwell
- Shire county: Oxfordshire
- Region: South East
- Country: England
- Sovereign state: United Kingdom
- Post town: Kidlington
- Postcode district: OX5
- Dialling code: 01869
- Police: Thames Valley
- Fire: Oxfordshire
- Ambulance: South Central
- UK Parliament: Bicester and Woodstock
- Website: Bletchingdon Village

Bletchingdon (also known as Bletchington) is a village and civil parish 2 miles (3 km) north of Kidlington and 6 miles (10 km) southwest of Bicester in Oxfordshire, England. Bletchingdon parish includes the hamlet of Enslow just over 1 mile (1.6 km) west of the village. The 2011 Census recorded the parish's population as 910.

== Toponym ==
The earliest known document to mention Bletchingdon is in the Domesday Book of 1086, which records it as Blecesdone. A charter written about 1130 records it as Blechesdune. The Feet of fines records it as Blechesdon in 1197. A document called the Placitorum abbreviato records it as Blechindon in 1279. It is derived from the Old English Blecces dūn meaning "Blecca's hill".

In recent centuries "Bletchington" has been an alternative spelling. In the 19th and 20th centuries Bletchington railway station at Enslow was spelt with a "t". A local business based on the site of the former station trades as "Smiths of Bletchington". Etymologically this is misleading, but its use is well-established and accepted.

Natives of the parish colloquially abbreviate it to "Bletch".

== Manor and estates ==
The Domesday Book records that in 1086 Robert D'Oyly held a manor of eight hides at Bletchingdon and his tenant was one Gilbert. Gilbert was an ancestor of Roger d'Amory, who was Lord of the manor of Bletchingdon until he died in prison in 1322.

In about 1139 Robert d'Amory gave 50 acres (20 ha) at Bletchingdon to Godstow Abbey, and Walter Pery gave the abbey one yardland and 10 acres (4 ha) at Bletchingdon. Godstow retained this estate until it surrendered all its property to the Crown in the Dissolution of the Monasteries in 1539.

Before 1151 Ralph Fitzniel and his mother Agnes gave half a hide at Bletchingdon to the Knights Templar preceptory at Cowley. The preceptory later moved to Sandford-on-Thames. In the reign of Edward II the Templars were suppressed and in 1513 the Knights Hospitaller held the same half hide at Bletchingdon.

By 1187 Ralph d'Amory had granted two virgates at Bletchingdon to Osney Abbey. In the 13th century other benefactors gave lands at Bletchingdon to the abbey, and in 1291 they were assessed as part of its Hampton Gay estate.

In the 14th century Bletchingdon manor house was the chief seat of Roger mentioned above and his wife Elizabeth de Clare (died 1360), foundress of Clare College, Cambridge.

On the east front of Manor Farm youse is a medallion with a bust, traditionally supposed to represent Oliver Cromwell. It is claimed that the house was Cromwell's headquarters for a time in the English Civil War.

=== Bletchingdon Park ===
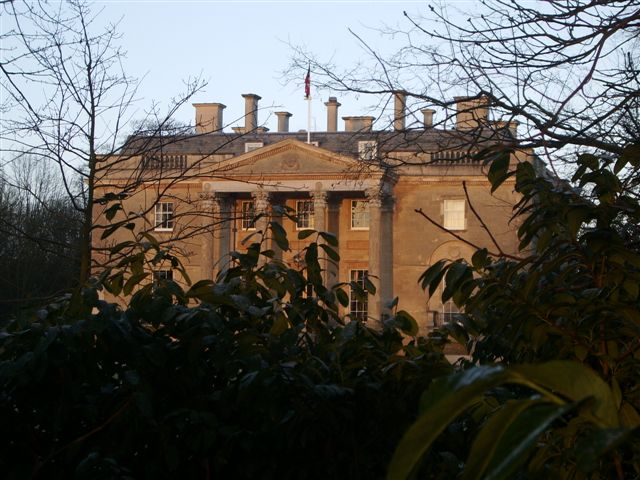
Bletchingdon Park, built in 1782

Bletchingdon's medieval manor house was rebuilt by Sir Thomas Coghill in about 1630. It was fortified and garrisoned by 200 Royalist troops in the Civil War, before being surrendered to Parliamentarian troops in 1645. John Coghill sold it to Viscount Valentia in 1716.

The present house at Bletchingdon Park is a Palladian country house next to the parish church that was designed by James Lewis and built in 1782 for Arthur Annesley, 5th Earl of Anglesey. It is a Grade II* listed building.

== Parish church ==
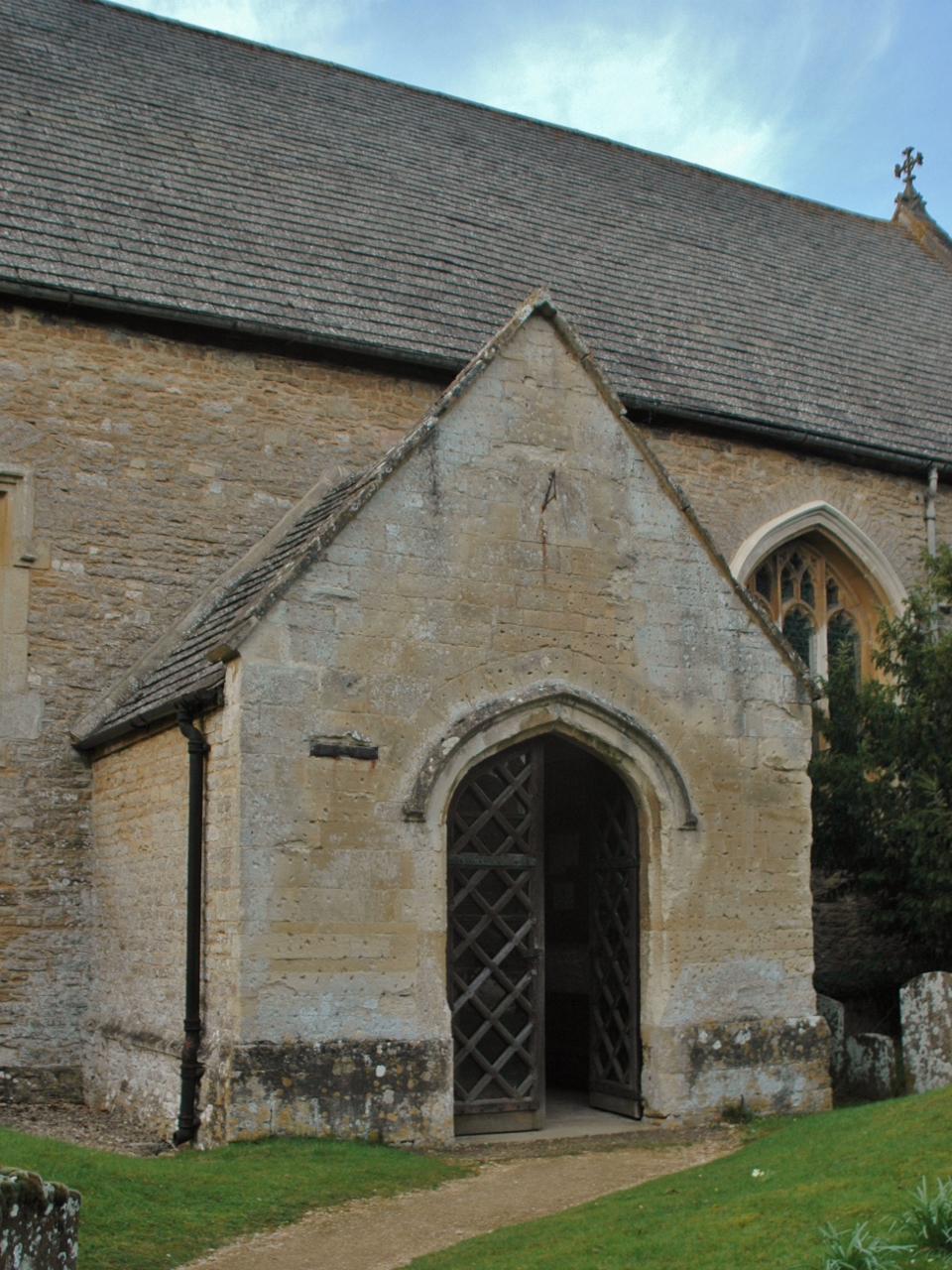
St Giles parish church porch, added in 1695, with four-centred arch

The Church of England parish church of Saint Giles includes traces of Norman architecture. Its Early English Gothic chancel is slightly later, built in the 13th century. Charles Buckeridge designed the north aisle, which was added probably in 1869. The church was heavily restored to Buckeridge's designs in 1878. It is a Grade II* listed building.

The west tower has a ring of six bells. Robert and William Cor of Aldbourne, Wiltshire cast the tenor bell in 1710. Edward Hemins of Bicester cast the second bell in 1738. Matthew III Bagley of Chacombe, Northamptonshire cast the fifth bell in 1774. James Barwell of Birmingham cast the third and fourth bells in 1877. The Whitechapel Bell Foundry cast the treble bell in 1998. The church has a Sanctus bell, also cast by James Barwell in 1877.

St Giles' is now part of the Benefice of Akeman, which includes the parishes of Chesterton, Hampton Gay, Kirtlington, Middleton Stoney, Wendlebury and Weston-on-the-Green.

== Economic and social history ==
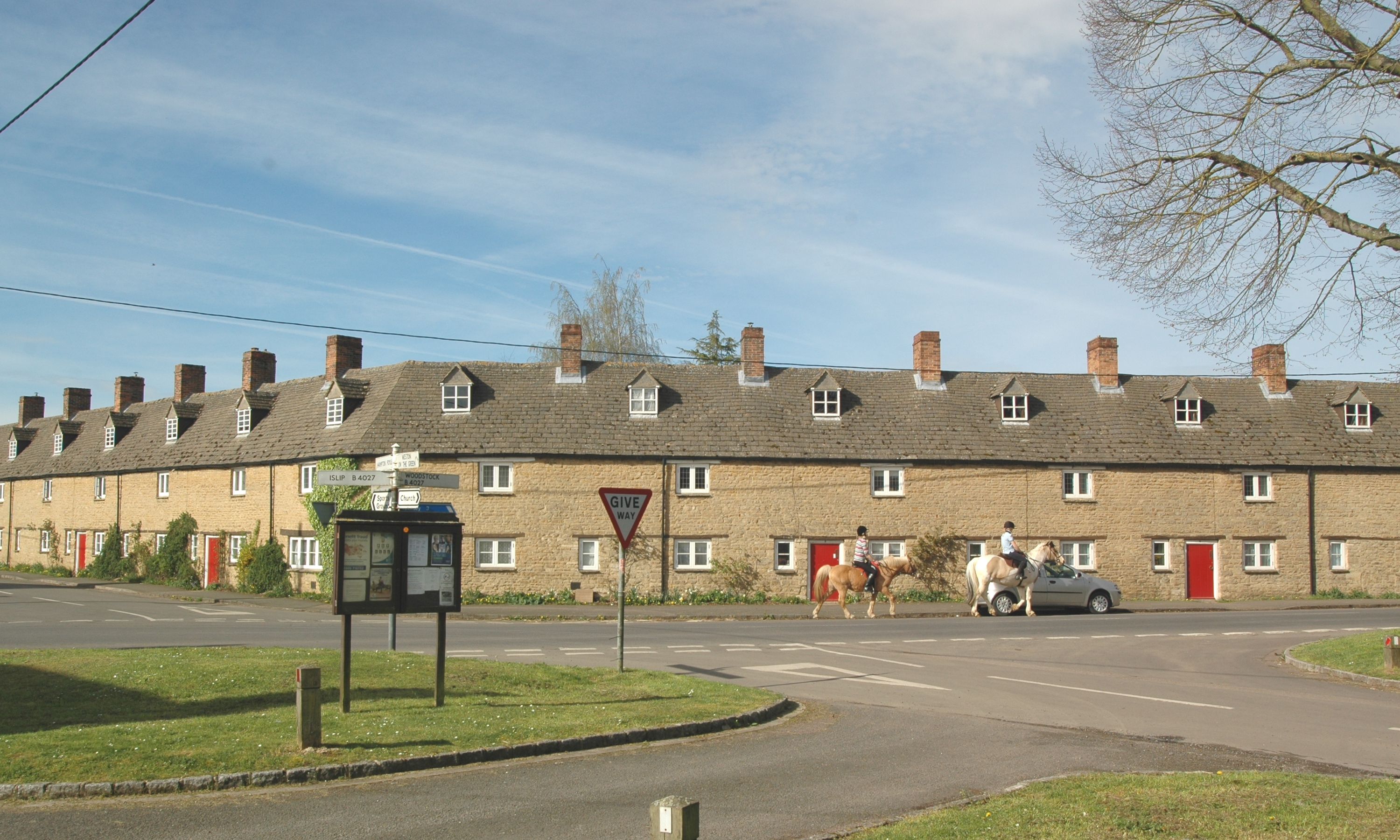
Cottages on the corner of Oxford Road, built in 1794 and restored in 1954

Bletchingdon village is on a road that in the Middle Ages was the main route linking London and Worcester. The section of that route through Bletchingdon is now classified as the B4027 road.

An open field system of farming prevailed in the parish until 1622. In the 13th and 14th centuries there were two fields: East Field and West Field. By 1539 it had been reorganised as a more efficient three-field system with the creation of South Field, apparently formed out of Breadcroft and part of East Field. In 1622 Bletchingdon's common lands – about 500 acres (200 ha) of arable land and about 600 acres (240 ha) of heath – were enclosed by agreement between the Lord of the manor, the Rector and the tenants. This is the earliest recorded instance of enclosure in Oxfordshire by common consent, and it predates by more than a century the first use of an inclosure act in Oxfordshire, which was at Mixbury by the Mixbury Inclosure Act 1729 (3 Geo. 2. c. 5 Pr.).

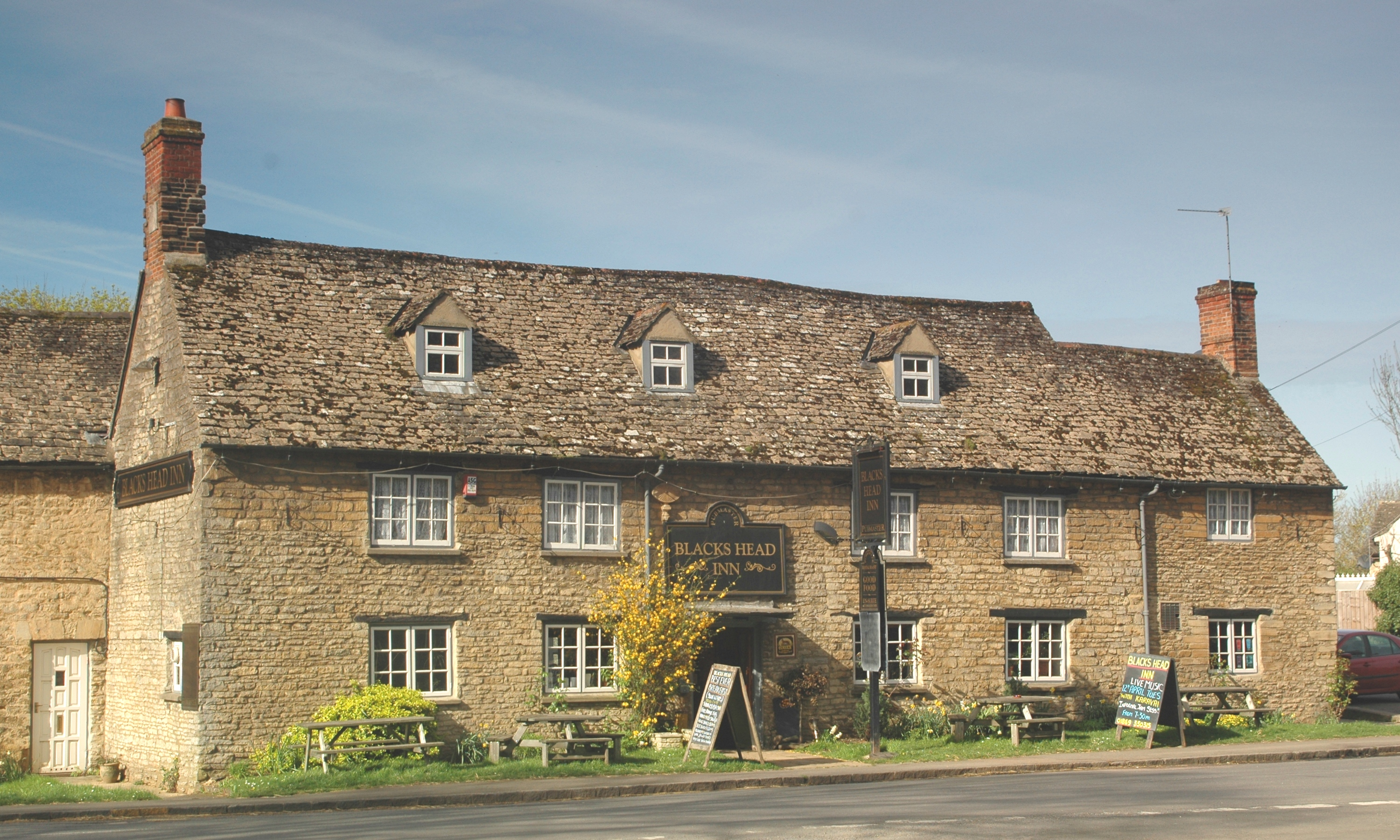
The Blacks Head public house

Bletchingdon village was originally built around a green, but the houses on the north side were demolished when Bletchingdon Park was extended. The earliest known record of a pub in the parish dates from 1616. By the 1670s there was one called the Angel and Crown. In 1703 Bletchingdon had three pubs: the Green Man, the Red Lion and the Swan. The Red Lion survived until 1951, when it lost its licence. The village's last surviving pub is The Blacks Head Inn. It is a 16th-century building that was enlarged in the 17th and 18th centuries. It was originally called The Blackamoor Head, probably after a black man-servant of the local Dashwood family, who is buried in Kirtlington chapel. Other theories about this pub are that it was named for battle honours attributed to a local military family, or perhaps in honour of King Charles II ("the black boy"), or it could be to do with livery of royal coach companies that stopped here.

In 1788 the Oxford Canal reached Enslow, bringing much cheaper coal from the English Midlands to the area. From 1845 the Oxford and Rugby Railway was built through Enslow, where Bletchington railway station was built. British Railways closed the station in 1964.

== Amenities ==
The parish has a Church of England primary school.

The village has a silver band, which in 2005 qualified for the National Brass Band Championships in Harrogate for the first time. The Band again qualified for the finals of the 2012 championships in Cheltenham.

=== Public transport ===
The nearest railway station is now Tackley on the Cherwell Valley Line, 2 miles (3 km) northwest of Bletchingdon.

Grayline bus route 24 serves Bletchingdon, linking the village with Oxford via Oxford Parkway in one direction and Bicester via Kirtlington, Weston-on-the-Green and Wendlebury in the other. Buses run from Mondays to Saturdays, six times a day in each direction. There is no late evening service, and no service on Sundays or bank holidays.

== Sources and further reading ==
- Ekwall, Eilert (1960) [1936]. Concise Oxford Dictionary of English Place-Names (4th ed.). Oxford: Oxford University Press. Bletchingdon. ISBN 0198691033.
- Gedling, Ian. 7 Circular Walks from Bletchingdon.
- Gray, Howard L (1959) [1915]. The English Field Systems. Cambridge, MA; London: Harvard University Press; Merlin Press. pp. 118, 538.
- Lobel, Mary D, ed. (1959). "Blechingdon". A History of the County of Oxford. Victoria County History. Vol. 6: Ploughley Hundred. London: Oxford University Press for the Institute of Historical Research. pp. 56–71.
- Sherwood, Jennifer; Pevsner, Nikolaus (1974). Oxfordshire. The Buildings of England. Harmondsworth: Penguin Books. pp. 475–476. ISBN 0-14-071045-0.
- Wing, William (1872). Annals of Bletchingdon, in the County of Oxford. Oxford.
