= Kidlington railway station =

Former railway station in England

Coordinates: 51.8299°N 1.3001°W

Kidlington
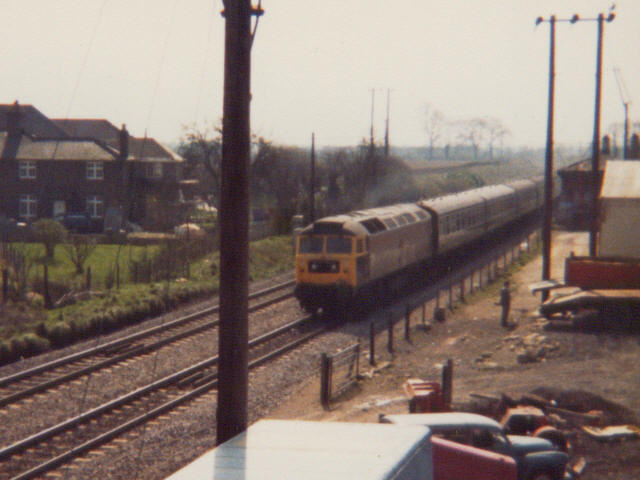
- A Class 47 Poole – Manchester service passes the still extant Kidlington station in April 1980.

General information
- Location: Kidlington, Cherwell; England
- Grid reference: SP483148
- Platforms: 3

Other information
- Status: Disused

History
- Original company: Oxford and Rugby Railway
- Pre-grouping: Great Western Railway
- Post-grouping: GWR; Western Region of British Railways

Key dates
- 1 June 1855: Station opens as Woodstock Road
- 1890: Bay platform built; Station renamed Kidlington
- 1954: Closure of branch line to Woodstock
- 2 November 1964: Station closes for passengers
- 21 June 1965: closed for goods
Location

Kidlington railway station is a former railway station in Oxfordshire, England, that opened in 1855 on the Oxford and Rugby Railway to serve the town of Kidlington and the adjacent town of Woodstock . It became a junction station in 1890 upon the opening of the Blenheim and Woodstock Branch Line, and served the area for over 100 years before falling victim to the programme of closures initiated by the Beeching Report in 1964. Following many proposals for its reopening, a new station to serve Kidlington opened in October 2015 at Oxford Parkway on the Oxford to Bicester Line.

== History ==
=== Opening ===
Although the Oxford and Rugby Railway opened in 1850, it was a further five years before the Brunelian station building was completed. Originally named Woodstock Road, the station was inconveniently sited at the northern end of Kidlington, around 20 minutes walk from the village centre. The station, a conventional two-platform stopping place with modest goods facilities, defied the railway convention that station buildings were usually sited on the platform nearest the settlement that they were purporting to serve. In this case, Kidlington village was to the east, whereas the station buildings were constructed on the western side, leaving the station effectively back-to-front. This can apparently be explained by the fact that the station was opened to serve Woodstock and not Kidlington, then a small village of around 2,400 inhabitants clustered around a church located over 1 mile (1.6 km) away from the station.

=== Goods facilities ===
When originally opened, the station was provided with a small goods yard and run-round loop for goods traffic on the down side. In addition, it was likely that two sidings had been installed: one to serve the loading dock to the rear of the down platform, and one connected to a goods shed of typical Great Western Railway design. The 57-by-40-foot (17 m × 12 m) shed was constructed out of yellowish brickwork and had five bays with brick pilasters.

Towards the end of the 19th century, the goods yard siding was extended across the station approach to serve a timber yard which had opened to the west of the station. This arrangement not only blocked passengers' access to the ticket office when wagons were being shunted, but also blocked all means of entry to the timber yard. An additional siding was therefore laid to provide a bypass for the shed which effectively put it on a short loop. Another siding was laid across the road in 1923 when Oxford Farmers Ltd opened a bacon factory.

=== Passenger facilities ===
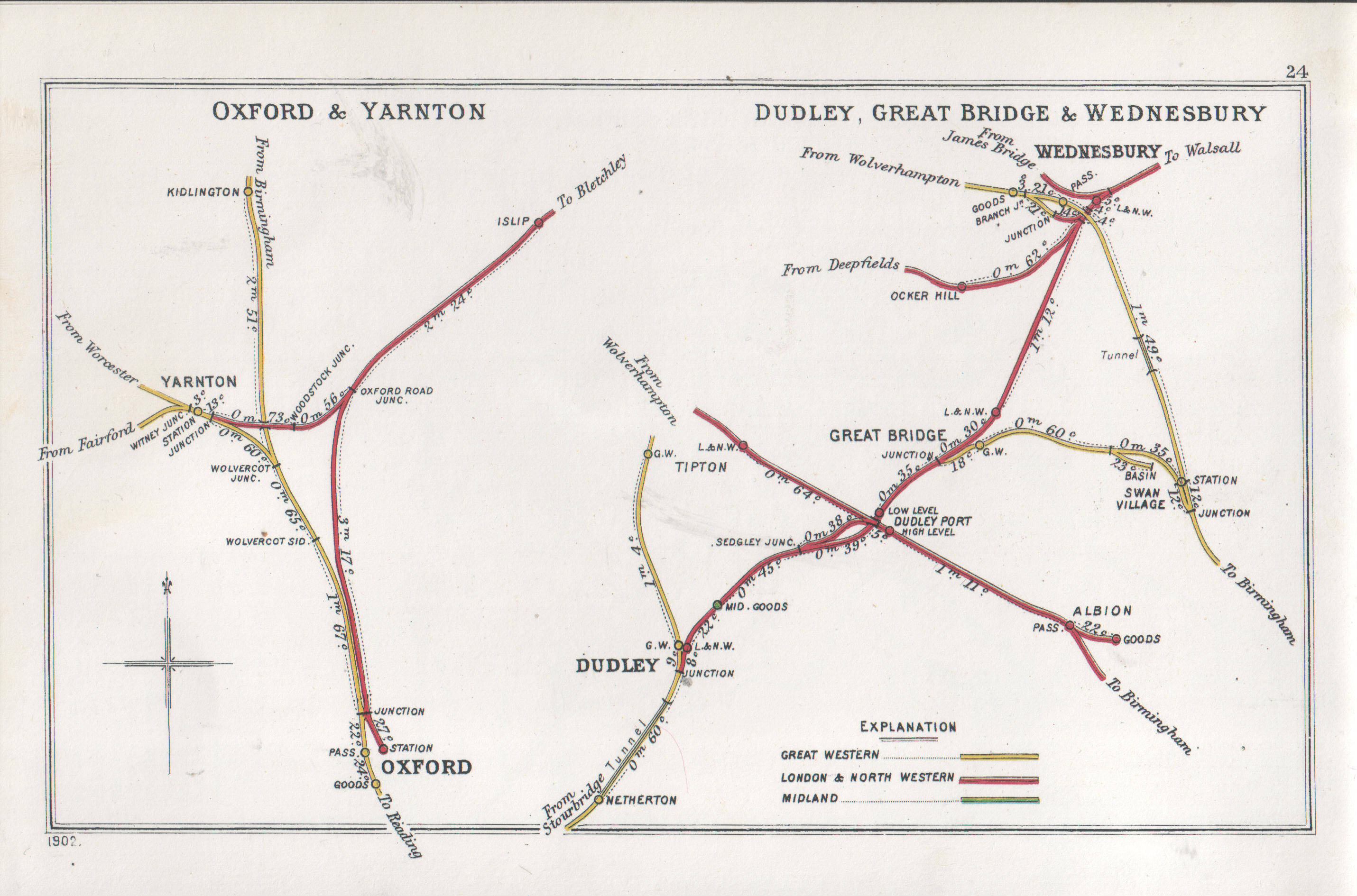
A 1902 Railway Clearing House map of railways in the vicinity of Kidlington

Opened in 1855, Kidlington was one of a group of six stations constructed during this period (the others being Heyford, Box, St Clears, Clynderwen and Aynho) whose architectural features appeared to distinguish them from other GWR stations. However, upon closer inspection they all were constructed with Cotswold rather than Italianate features. Kidlington resembled St Germans on the Cornish Main Line, but its hipped roof and larger canopy made it seem at first glance very different.

Substantial station buildings constructed out of local oolitic limestone were provided on both platforms. The larger of the two was the down building, crowned by three tall Italianate chimneys, which comprised a waiting room, ladies' waiting room and ladies' toilet. The up building was much smaller but similar in size and contained a large waiting room, the booking hall, a parcels office, the stationmaster's office, a porter's room and a gents' toilet. A canopied passenger footbridge was added at the turn of the 19th century. Both platforms had picturesque gardens, complete with rustic arches and flower baskets.

=== Blenheim and Woodstock branch line ===
When Kidlington became a junction station in 1890 upon the opening of the 4-mile (6.4 km) Blenheim and Woodstock Branch Line, a bay platform was constructed alongside the country end of the down platform on the alignment of a former goods siding. The down platform itself was extended north towards the Banbury Road bridge to allow sufficient room for terminating branch services. The station was also renamed Kidlington to avoid confusion with the new Blenheim and Woodstock station. By the 1950s, rationalisation and cuts in the frequency of services led to passengers alighting at Kidlington having to wait two hours for a connecting train to Oxford. Passenger numbers had fallen from 23,000 in the 1930s to fewer than 9,000 in 1952, with each train carrying on average 5 to 6 passengers, and sometimes even running empty. In Kidlington, due to the inconvenient siting of the station, villagers preferred the more convenient bus services to Oxford. British Railways closed the Blenheim and Woodstock Branch Line in 1954,.

=== Decline and closure ===
By the 1950s the station was served with around six trains a day. The new housing developments in the village were situated on its southern side and the new occupants also preferred local bus services to Oxford rather than walk the 2 miles (3.2 km) to the station. It was therefore no surprise when Kidlington was listed for closure in the Beeching Report together with Bletchington, Tackley and Heyford . A reprieve was given by the Government to Tackley and Heyford, but Bletchington and Kidlington closed in November 1964, despite it being the largest village on the Cherwell Valley Line between Oxford and Banbury..

Preceding station	Historical railways	Following station
Bletchington; Line open, station closed	Great Western Railway; Oxford and Rugby Railway	Wolvercot Platform; Line open, station closed
	Disused railways	
Terminus	Great Western Railway; Blenheim and Woodstock Branch Line	Shipton-on-Cherwell Halt; Line and station closed

== Present day ==
=== Remains ===
After closure, Kidlington station was used by a printing firm although the up buildings and platform were demolished. By 1973, all that remained was the down building and goods shed. The shed was at that time occupied by a plastics firm, whilst the parcels office was an antique shop and the booking office had become a denture repairers. The signal box was demolished in 1970. The passenger footbridge was taken down and re-erected near Didcot North Junction where it replaced a similar bridge which had been badly damaged following a derailment.

The goods shed was demolished in 1984 and most of the surrounding goods yard is now occupied by an industrial estate known as The Station Field. The connection with the former Woodstock branch has been obscured by deep ballasting on the main line.

=== Proposed new stations ===
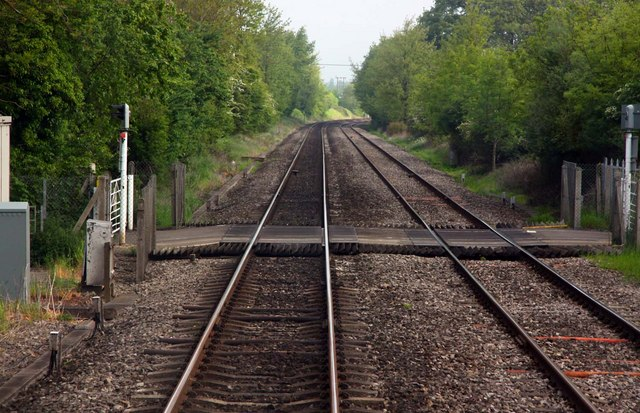
Roundham Level Crossing, once considered as the site of a new Kidlington station.

There have been calls since the 1970s for the reopening of Kidlington station as a Park and ride facility for local commuters. The new station should, it was proposed, be reopened on a site closer to the village centre, such as Roundham Lane Crossing. The idea was enthusiastically received by British Rail, which called for the scheme to be backed by financial contributions from local authorities. These were not forthcoming and the land earmarked for the station was redeveloped, leaving insufficient room for an approach road and car park.

Since the 1980s, Oxfordshire County Council has advocated a new Kidlington station on the Cherwell Valley Line on land beside Lyne Road between Flatford Place and Thorne Close.

Train operating company Chiltern Railways constructed a new station on the Oxford to Bicester Line just south of Kidlington as part of its Project Evergreen 3 development programme. Located at Oxford Parkway, near the site of the former Oxford Road Halt, the station opened in October 2015.

In January 2017, the council called plans for an 'Oxford Metro' as part of the Oxford station upgrade which would allow this to happen and could include a new station at Kidlington.

The current Cherwell District Council plan reserves land for a station beside Sandy Lane level crossing.

== Sources ==
- Butt, R. V. J. (October 1995). The Directory of Railway Stations: details every public and private passenger station, halt, platform and stopping place, past and present (1st ed.). Sparkford: Patrick Stephens Ltd. ISBN 978-1-85260-508-7. OCLC 60251199. OL 11956311M.
- Baggs, A.P.; Blair, W.J.; Chance, Eleanor; Colvin, Christina; Cooper, Janet; Day, C.J.; Selwyn, Nesta; Townley, S.C. (1990). Crosley, Alan; Elrington, C.R. (eds.). Victoria County History: A History of the County of Oxford, Volume 12.
- "Chiltern Evergreen3 – Home". Chiltern Railways. 2009. Archived from the original on 28 August 2009.
- Jenkins, Stanley C. (1987). The Woodstock Branch. Didcot, Oxon: Wild Swan Publications. ISBN 0-906867-51-7.
- Jowett, Alan (2000). Jowett's Nationalised Railway Atlas (1st ed.). Penryn, Cornwall: Atlantic Transport Publishers. ISBN 978-0-906899-99-1. OCLC 228266687.
- Lingard, Richard (1973). The Woodstock Branch. Risinghurst, Oxford: Oxford Publishing Co. ISBN 0-902888-23-4.
- Searle, Muriel V. (1983). Lost Lines: An Anthology of Britain's Lost Railways. London: New Cavendish Books. ISBN 0-904568-41-5.
