= Blenheim and Woodstock branch line =

The Blenheim and Woodstock branch line was a 4-mile (6.4 km) railway branch line that linked Kidlington and Woodstock, Oxfordshire. It ran from Kidlington railway station parallel with the Cherwell Valley Line north to Shipton-on-Cherwell, where it turned west through Shipton-on-Cherwell Halt towards Blenheim and Woodstock.

== History ==
Woodstock Railway Act 1886
- Act of Parliament
- Parliament of the United Kingdom
- Long title: An Act for incorporating the Woodstock Railway Company and for other purposes.
- Citation: 50 Vict. c. xxx

Dates
- Royal assent: 25 September 1886

Text of statute as originally enacted

The Woodstock Railway Company was incorporated by the Woodstock Railway Act 1886 (50 Vict. c. xxx).

A railway two miles four furlongs and seven chains in length commencing in the parish of Shipton-on-Cherwell by a junction with the Great Western Railway (Oxford and Birmingham line) at or near a point on that railway one hundred and forty-five yards or thereabouts measured in a southerly direction along the said railway from the mile post denoting seventy and a quarter miles from London and terminating at Woodstock in the parish of Hensington on or near the eastern side of the road leading from Woodstock to Oxford at a point two chains or thereabouts measured in a north-easterly direction from the entrance door of the County Police Station at Woodstock and in the premises forming or reputed to form part of the Blenheim estates in the occupation of the representatives of the late William Heynes Joseph Smith and George Warmington. — Section 5, Woodstock Railway Act 1886 (50 Vict. c. xxx)

Built for the 8th Duke of Marlborough, the line opened on 19 May 1890 and was privately owned until 1897 when it became part of the Great Western Railway under the Great Western Railway (Additional Powers) Act 1897 (60 & 61 Vict. c. ccxlviii), although the line had been operated by Great Western Railway from its inception. In 1929 Shipton-on-Cherwell Halt was opened, primarily to serve the Bunker's Hill Oxford and Shipton Cement Company limestone quarry and cement works. The last train ran on 27 February 1954 and track lifting was completed in January 1958.

== Train services ==
The original service was four trains each way between Oxford and Blenheim and Woodstock. By around 1910, this had become ten trains a day and it remained at this level for many years. By 1938, the passenger service had been pruned back to nine trains a day, not all trains running through to Oxford. The number of trains serving the station was cut in the late 1930s, and again in 1952 down to only six trains a day. These cuts in the frequency of trains along the Woodstock branch line produced two-hour waits at Kidlington for a connection.

== Closure ==
British Railways closed the branch line in March 1954 with the last train adorned with a wreath. The track was lifted in 1958.

== Bibliography ==
- Butt, R. V. J. (October 1995). The Directory of Railway Stations: details every public and private passenger station, halt, platform and stopping place, past and present (1st ed.). Sparkford: Patrick Stephens Ltd. ISBN 978-1-85260-508-7. OCLC 60251199. OL 11956311M.
- Jowett, Alan (2000). Jowett's Nationalised Railway Atlas (1st ed.). Penryn, Cornwall: Atlantic Transport Publishers. ISBN 978-0-906899-99-1. OCLC 228266687.
