= Cherwell Valley line =

Railway line in Oxfordshire, England

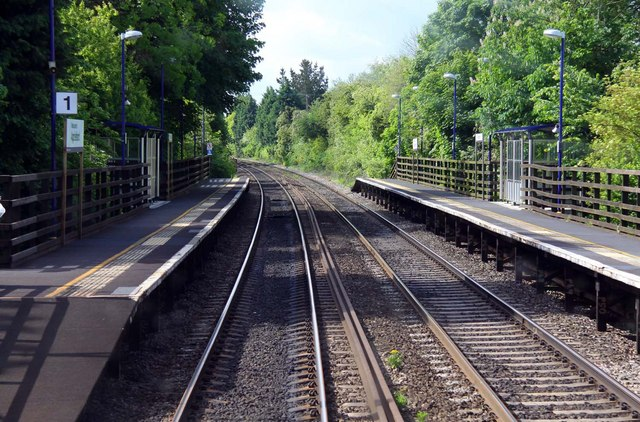
- Appleford railway station in 2009

Overview
- Status: Operational
- Owner: Network Rail
- Locale: Oxfordshire, South East England
- Stations: 7

Service
- Type: Heavy rail
- System: National Rail
- Operator(s): CrossCountry; Great Western Railway
- Rolling stock: Class 165 "Networker Turbo"; Class 220 "Voyager"; Class 221 "Super Voyager"; Class 800 "Intercity Express Train"; Class 802 "Intercity Express Train"

Technical
- Track gauge: 1,435 mm (4 ft 8 1/2 in) standard gauge
- Operating speed: 110 mph (177 km/h) maximum
Route map
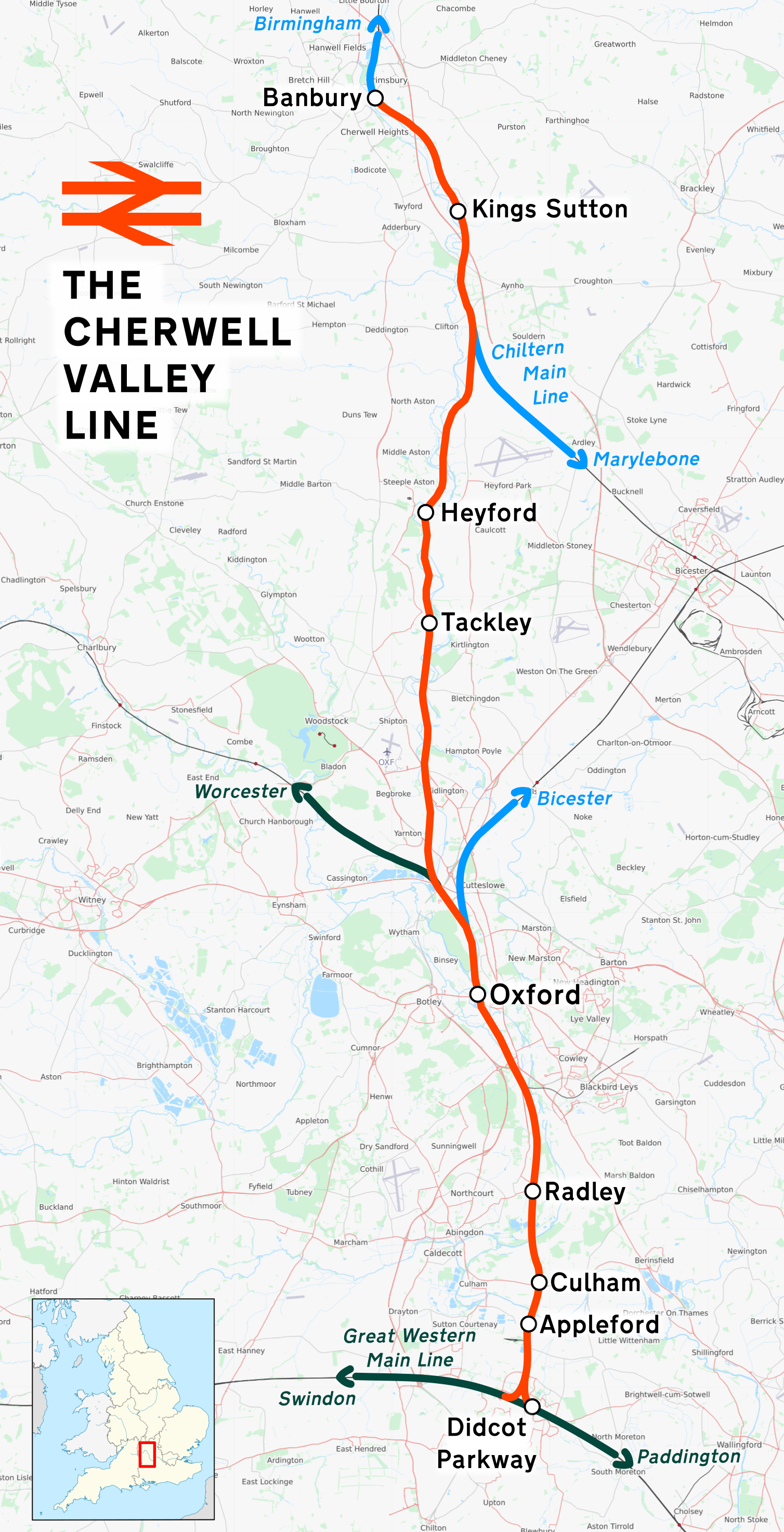
(Click to expand)

The Cherwell Valley line is the railway line between Didcot and Banbury via Oxford. It links the Great Western Main Line and the south to the Chiltern Main Line and the Midlands. The line follows the River Cherwell for much of its route between Banbury and Oxford.

== History ==
=== Oxford Railway ===
Oxford Railway Act 1843
- Act of Parliament
- Parliament of the United Kingdom
- Long title: An Act for making a Railway from the Great Western Railway to the City of Oxford.
- Citation: 6 & 7 Vict. c. x

Dates
- Royal assent: 11 April 1843

Text of statute as originally enacted

The line from Didcot to Oxford was promoted by the Oxford Railway Company, and authorised by the Oxford Railway Act 1843 (6 & 7 Vict. c. x).

And be it enacted, That the Railway hereby authorized to be made shall commence by a Junction with the Great Western Railway at or near to the Point where the said last-mentioned Railway crosses the Highway leading from Didcot to Appleford in the Parish of Didcot otherwise called Dudcot in the County of Berks, and shall pass through the following Places or some of them; (that is to say,)

- Didcot otherwise Dudcot, Hamlet of Appleford in the Parish of Sutton Courtney, St. Helen Abingdon, Sunningwell, Radley, and South Hinksey, in the County of Berks;
- Cullum and Newnham Courtney, in the County of Oxford; and
- Liberty of Grand Pont in the Parishes of St. Aldate and North Hinksey, in the City of Oxford or County of Oxford or of Berks;

And shall terminate in or near a certain Field belonging or reputed to belong to the Principal and Fellows of Brazennose College, Oxford, and lying on the West Side of the Turnpike Road leading from Oxford to Abingdon in the Liberty of Grand Pont and Parish of St. Aldate in the City of Oxford and Counties of Oxford and Berks, or some or one of them.

— Section 227, Oxford Railway Act 1843 (6 & 7 Vict. c. x)

Before it opened, the Oxford Railway became part of the Great Western Railway by the Great Western Railway Act 1844 (7 & 8 Vict. c. iii), and the line became the GWR Oxford branch.

=== Oxford and Rugby Railway ===
The line from Oxford to Banbury was built by the Oxford and Rugby Railway, and authorised by the Oxford and Rugby Railway Act 1845 (8 & 9 Vict. c. clxxxviii).

And be it enacted, That the said Railway shall commence by a Junction with the Oxford Branch of the Great Western Railway either in the Liberty of Grand Pont and Parish of Saint Aldate in the City of Oxford and Counties of Oxford and Berks, or some or One of them, or in the Parish of South Hinksey in the Liberty of the City of Oxford and the County of Berks, and shall pass through the following Places, or some of them, (that is to say,) South Hinksey, North Hinksey, in the County of Berks; Saint Aldate, Saint Thomas, in the Counties of Oxford and Berks, or One of them; Saint Giles in the County of Oxford; Port Meadow in the County of Oxford, or Port Meadow in the Parish of Binsey, and Saint Giles in the Liberty of the City of Oxford; Wolvercot, Yarnton, Kidlington, Begbrook or Begbroke, Hampton Gay, Shipton, Bletchington or Bletchingdon, Kirtlington, Tackley, Rousham or Rouseham, Lower Heyford, Upper Heyford, Steeple Aston, Somerton, Fritwell, Souldern, Adderbury, Banbury, [...] — Section 20, Oxford and Rugby Railway Act 1845 (8 & 9 Vict. c. clxxxviii)

Before it opened, the Oxford and Rugby Railway became part of the Great Western Railway by the Great Western Railway Act 1846 (9 & 10 Vict. c. xiv).

== Current and former stations served ==
- Banbury, formerly called Banbury Bridge Street
- Kings Sutton
- Former station at Aynho for Deddington
- Former station at Fritwell & Somerton
- Heyford, formerly called Lower Heyford
- Tackley
- Former station for Bletchington, previously called Kirtlington
- Former station at Kidlington previously called Woodstock Road
- Former halt at Wolvercot Platform
- Oxford
- Former halt at Hinksey
- Former halt at Abingdon Road
- Radley
- Former station at Abingdon Junction
- Culham, formerly called Abingdon Road
- Appleford
- Didcot Parkway, formerly called Didcot

The former station for Bletchingdon was always spelt "Bletchington", which is an alternative spelling for that village's toponym. The former halt at Wolvercote was called "Wolvercot Platform", with a deliberately different spelling of the village's name, to distinguish it from the London and North Western Railway's nearby Wolvercote Halt.

The line has a maximum speed of 110 mph (177 km/h).

== Services ==
Passenger services are provided by CrossCountry and Great Western Railway. CrossCountry call only at Oxford and Banbury on their services south to Southampton and north to Birmingham New Street and beyond, while Great Western Railway operate both local and express services on the line, with express services typically continuing onto the Cotswold Line towards Worcester Foregate Street and Hereford, or the Great Western main line towards London Paddington.

The line carries a large and increasing volume of freight between the Port of Southampton and the Midlands, much of it container trains operated by Freightliner.

== Tilting ==
With the exception of the West Coast Main Line, this route was the only route on which domestic UK trains could tilt, something of which Virgin CrossCountry took advantage, using Class 221 Super Voyagers from 2004. After Virgin CrossCountry's successor CrossCountry elected to remove the tilting equipment from its Class 221s to increase reliability and reduce costs, tilt running ceased in 2008.

== River Thames ==
The line makes three crossings of the River Thames between Oxford and Didcot:

- Osney Rail Bridge
- Nuneham Railway Bridge
- Appleford Railway Bridge

== Electrification ==
In 1977 the Parliamentary Select Committee on Nationalised Industries recommended considering electrification of more of Britain's rail network, and by 1979 BR presented a range of options to do so by 2000. Some of these options would have included the whole Cherwell Valley line and the Banbury–Birmingham section of what is now the Chiltern Main Line plus the Coventry to Leamington line. The 1979–90 Conservative governments that succeeded the 1976–79 Labour government did not implement the proposal.

Under plans for the Great Western Electrification project announced in July 2009, the Cherwell Valley line was due to be electrified from Didcot as far as Oxford. However, delays and cost overruns elsewhere caused this to be deferred indefinitely in 2016.
