= Wolvercot Platform railway station =

Former railway station in Oxfordshire, England

Coordinates: 51.7851°N 1.2865°W

Wolvercot Platform

General information
- Location: Oxford, City of Oxford; England
- Grid reference: SP493098
- Platforms: 2

Other information
- Status: Disused

History
- Original company: Great Western Railway
- Pre-grouping: Great Western Railway

Key dates
- 1 February 1908: Station opened
- 1 January 1916: Station closed
Location

Wolvercot Platform was a halt on the Great Western Railway line between Oxford and Banbury. The line is now known as the Cherwell Valley Line or the "Oxford Canal Line".

== History ==
The platform was opened on 1 February 1908; it was situated on the north side of Godstow Road, and served the village of Wolvercote, but was spelt Wolvercot to try to reduce confusion with the nearby Wolvercote Halt on the London and North Western Railway's Varsity Line. Although only a halt, Wolvercot had once been staffed and during the First World War it became the first station to have a stationmistress. The lady in question was Miss Margaret Elsden, sister of Mr A.H. Elsden who became stationmaster at Birmingham Snow Hill. Margaret Elsden later married Frank Buckingham who became stationmaster at Oxford.

The GWR closed Wolvercot Platform on 1 January 1916. Wolvercot Siding signalbox, a 29-lever hipped roof structure which survived the closure, controlled the level crossing over Godstow Road as well as vehicular access to the adjacent meadows. The down starter in Wolvercot Siding carried the distant arms for Wolvercot Junction, 1/2 mile (0.80 km) to the north, where the Oxford, Worcester and Wolverhampton Line diverged north-westwards from the Birmingham Main Line.

== Route ==
Services were provided by steam railmotors based at Oxford, which was also the southern terminus; the northern terminus of these services was Kidlington, Blenheim and Woodstock, or Heyford.

Preceding station	Historical railways	Following station
Kidlington; Line open, station closed	Great Western Railway; Cherwell Valley Line	Oxford; Line and station open
