= Oxford railway station =

Railway station in Oxfordshire, England

Oxford
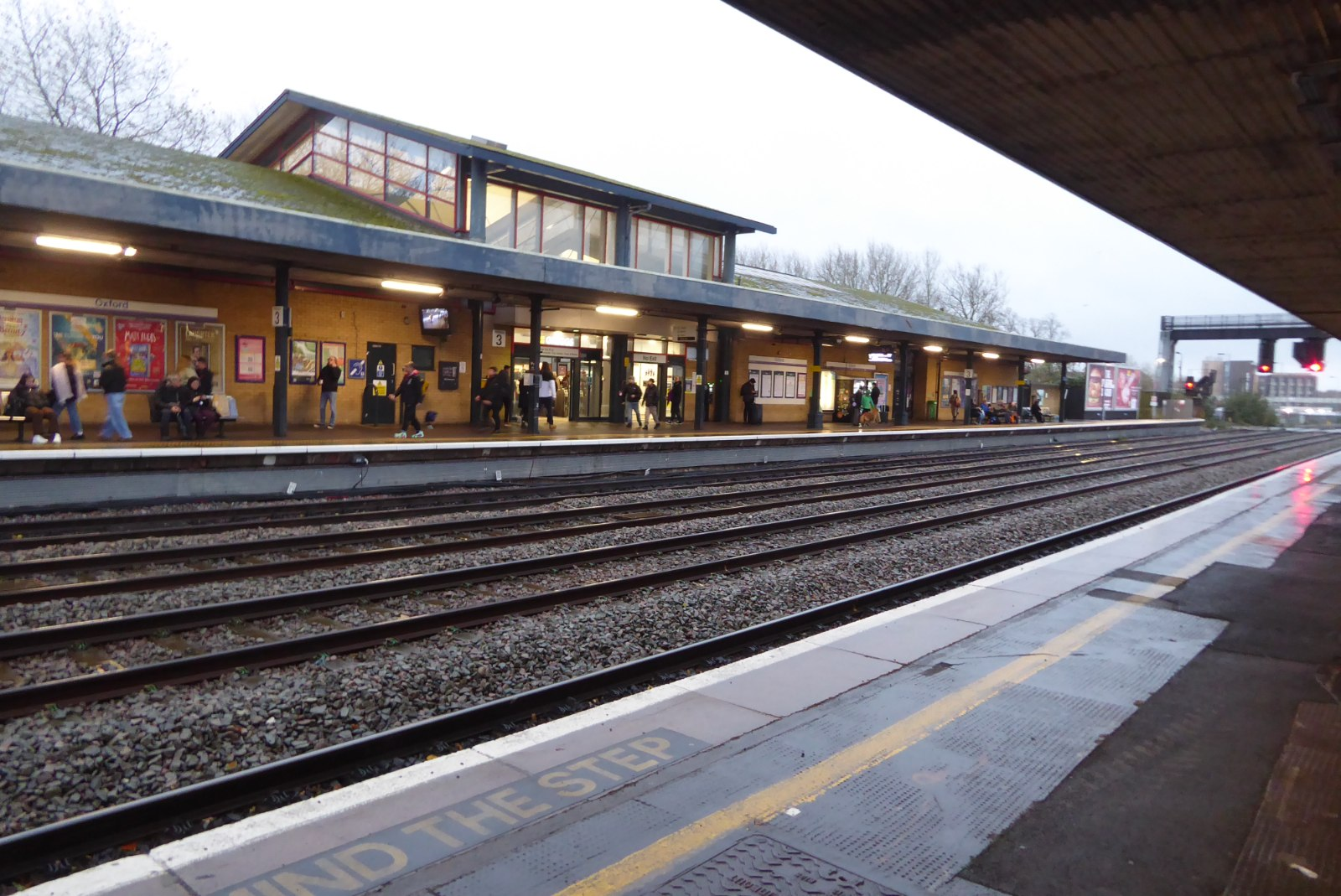
- Oxford station in 2024

General information
- Location: Oxford, City of Oxford, England
- Coordinates: 51.7534°N 1.2703°W
- Grid reference: SP504063
- Manager: Great Western Railway
- Platforms: 4
- Tracks: 6

Other information
- Station code: OXF
- Classification: DfT category B

History
- Original company: Great Western Railway
- Pre-grouping: Great Western Railway
- Post-grouping: Great Western Railway

Key dates
- 1852: Opened
- 1971: Rebuilt
- 1990: Rebuilt

Passengers
- 2020/21: ▼1.575 million
- Interchange: ▼0.114 million
- 2021/22: ▲5.013 million
- Interchange: ▲0.389 million
- 2022/23: ▲6.582 million
- Interchange: ▲0.514 million
- 2023/24: ▲6.787 million
- Interchange: ▲0.594 million
- 2024/25: ▲8.145 million
- Interchange: ▼0.539 million
Location
Notes
- Passenger statistics from the Office of Rail and Road

Oxford is a main line railway station, one of two (Note: The other is Oxford Parkway, near Kidlington) that serve the city of Oxford, in Oxfordshire, England. It lies about 0.5 miles (800 m) west of the city centre, north-west of Frideswide Square and the eastern end of Botley Road. It is the busiest station in the county and the fourth busiest in the South East England region. Immediately to the north is Sheepwash Channel Railway Bridge over the Sheepwash Channel.

The station is a stop on the line for trains between London Paddington and Hereford, via Worcester Shrub Hill. It is a starting point for fast and local trains to London Paddington and London Marylebone, and for local trains to Reading, Worcester (Shrub Hill and Foregate stations), and Banbury. It is also on the north–south Cross Country Route from Manchester Piccadilly and Newcastle, via Birmingham New Street and Reading, to Southampton Central and Bournemouth. The station is managed by Great Western Railway, which also provides services along with CrossCountry and Chiltern Railways.

== History ==
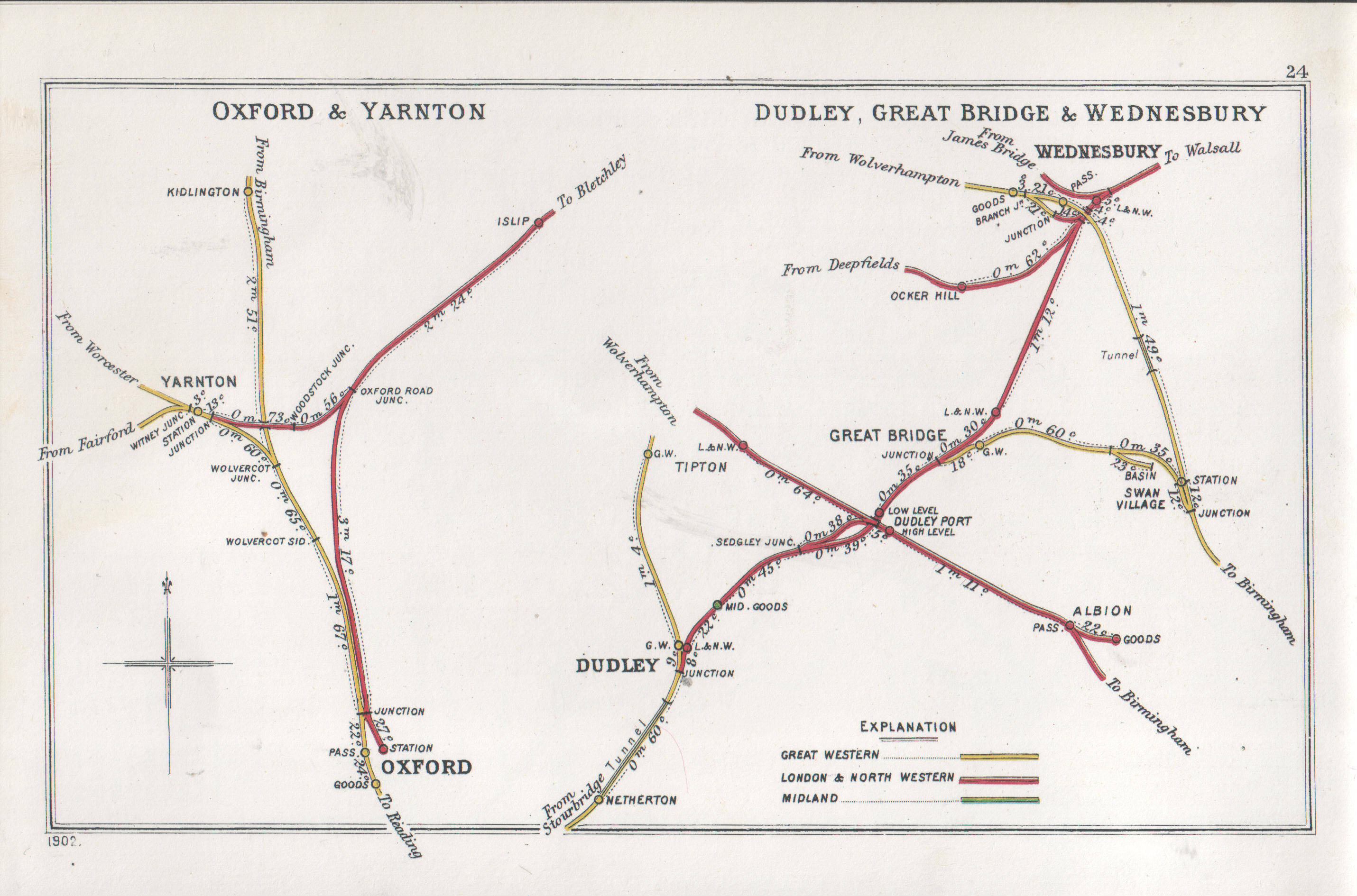
A 1902 Railway Clearing House map of railways in the Oxford area

The Great Western Railway (GWR) opened its line to Oxford on 12 June 1844 with a terminus station in what is now Western Road, Grandpont. In 1845, the Oxford and Rugby Railway (ORR) began to build its line, starting from a junction at New Hinksey 0.75 miles (1.2 km) south of the GWR terminus. The junction was known as Millstream Junction, and was between the future sites of Hinksey Halt and Abingdon Road Halt, both of which were opened in 1908. The GWR took over the ORR while it was still being built and opened the line as far as Banbury on 2 September 1850. For just over two years, trains from Oxford to Banbury started at Grandpont, and had to reverse at Millstream Junction in order to continue their journey.

The ORR line included a new through station in Park End Street, so when this opened with the extension of the line from Banbury to Birmingham on 1 October 1852, the original Grandpont terminus was closed to passenger services. The old station at Grandpont became a goods depot, but was closed completely on 26 November 1872, the day that the broad gauge tracks were removed north of Didcot. The site of the station was then sold, as was the trackbed from Millstream Junction, some 66 chains (1,300 m) in length.

Major subsequent changes were removal of the last 7 ft 0 1/4 in (2,140 mm) gauge tracks in 1872 and of the train shed in 1890–1. The station was substantially rebuilt by the Western Region of British Railways in 1971, further improvements being carried out during 1974 including the provision of a new travel centre, and the new main building and footbridge were added in 1990 by Network SouthEast.

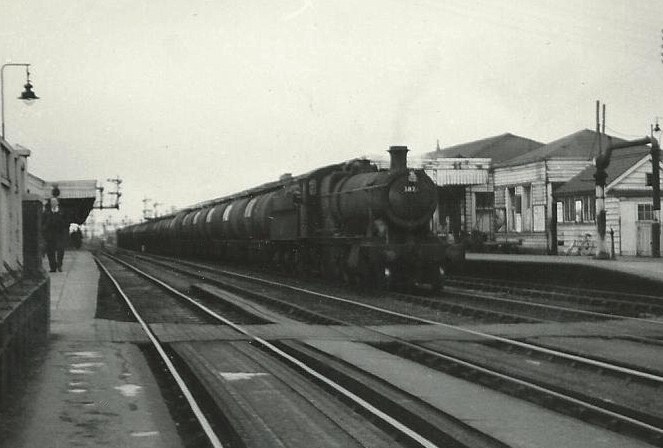
A GWR 2-8-0, 1965

Planning permission was granted for the expansion to support the proposed Chiltern Railways service to London Marylebone and the service was subsequently launched on 12 December 2016. Meanwhile, Oxford City Council, Oxfordshire County Council and Network Rail have developed a masterplan for further development of the station. Construction of an additional platform has been proposed.

Flood remediation work south of the station at Hinksey saw services at the station curtailed & replaced by buses to/from Didcot Parkway in July and August 2016. This allowed the trackbed to be raised by 2 feet (0.65 m) and new culverts installed to reduce the impact of flooding from the nearby River Thames upon the railway (which has caused service interruptions on several occasions in recent years). Concurrent bridge repair work at Hanborough and signalling alterations at Banbury was also carried out over this period. The £18 million scheme was completed on 15 August 2016.

The station has always been busy. In addition to current services, formerly there were others over the Wycombe Railway, Oxford, Witney and Fairford Railway, and Blenheim and Woodstock Branch Line. (Note: The recently published Lost Railways of Oxfordshire gives information on all three of these services and The Woodstock Branch gives an overview of how the service to Oxford changed over the line's life.) Through trains from the north to the Southern Railway also typically changed locomotives at Oxford.

For a time, it was known as Oxford General station to distinguish it from the London and North Western Railway's Oxford Rewley Road terminus of the Varsity Line to Cambridge, which was adjacent and came under joint management in 1933. On 1 October 1951 British Railways closed Rewley Road station to passengers and transferred its services to this station.

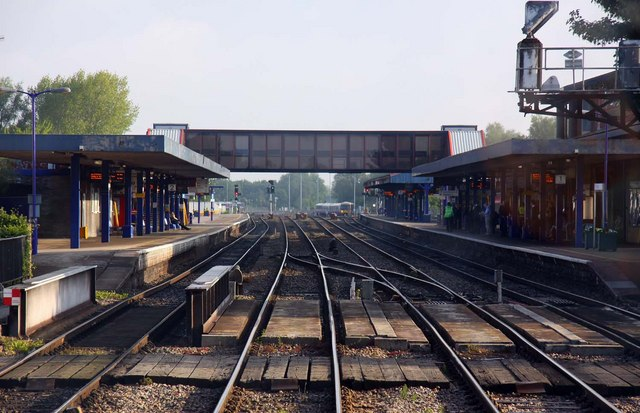
Oxford station in 2009 looking from the south with platforms 4 (left) and 3 (right)

South of the station immediately west of the railway tracks is Osney Cemetery, established in 1848 just before the current station site. Nearby is the site of the former Osney Abbey.

== Plans ==
=== Further expansion ===
In November 2009, it was announced that Oxford station would be expanded. A £10 million joint development between Network Rail and Oxfordshire County Council would create a new platform on part of the station's long-stay car park. The new platform (south of platform 1) would allow trains to arrive and depart from the same track and reduce the need for empty trains to be shunted around the station. Currently, in busy periods trains can be kept waiting outside of the station for a platform to become available.

A new covered footbridge would also be built over Botley Road to link the station building with the new platform, replacing the existing footbridge to the car park. The new platform was to have been brought into use during 2011, and was to be part of the city and county councils' West End Area Action Plan for the western part of the city centre, which also considers other rail projects such as Evergreen 3 and the Paddington–Oxford electrification.

Chiltern Railways has raised the possibility of developing a service between Oxford and the Cowley branch line.

=== Project Evergreen 3 ===
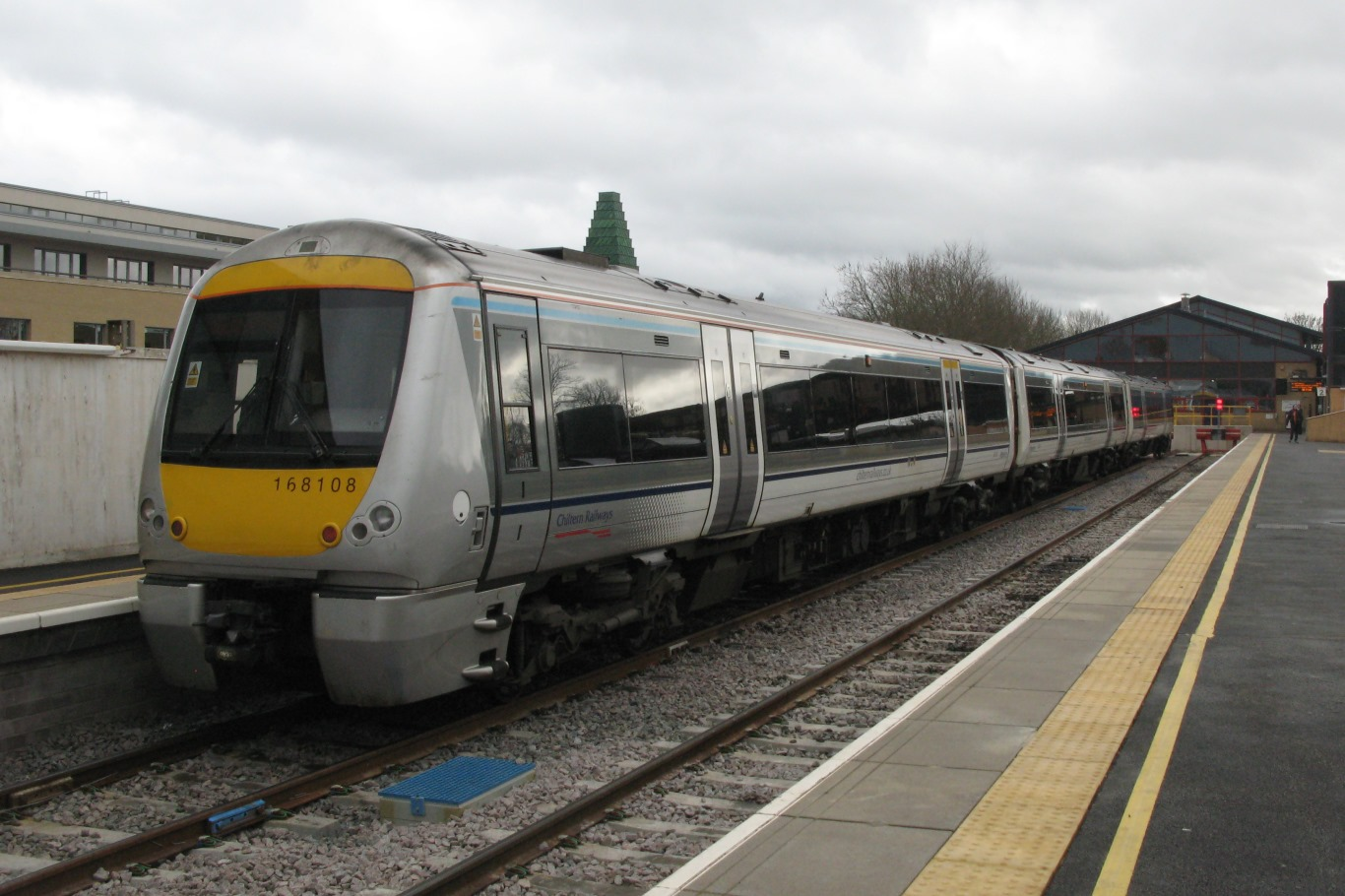
A Chiltern Railways service, 2017

In August 2008, Chiltern Railways announced Project Evergreen 3, a proposal to construct a 0.25 miles (400 m) chord between the Oxford to Bicester Line and the Chiltern Main Line, to allow a new Oxford to London Marylebone service to run via Bicester Village and High Wycombe. Work began in 2014; the project, which included reinstatement of double track between Bicester and Oxford, was completed in 2015 as far as the new station at Oxford Parkway and the service from here to Bicester and Marylebone commenced on 26 October 2015. Services to Oxford were planned to start in Spring 2016, although locals objected to the extra noise that would be caused. Network Rail completed the final stages of infrastructure work in the Wolvercote Tunnel and Peartree areas in September 2016, and Chiltern Railways began services from Oxford to Oxford Parkway on 11 December 2016.

=== East West Rail ===
The Chiltern route out of Oxford is shared with the western section of East West Rail, which reuses part of the historic Varsity Line route between Oxford and Cambridge. The initial services were planned to commence in 2025, calling at Winslow and Bletchley, then Milton Keynes Central or Bedford. Extension to Cambridge is planned, but not scheduled. In March 2025, the Department of Transport announced that the service would be operated by Chiltern Railways. Chiltern expected the service to become operational in late 2025. As of January 2026, the service has yet to begin, due to an industrial dispute over driver controlled operation.

== Services ==
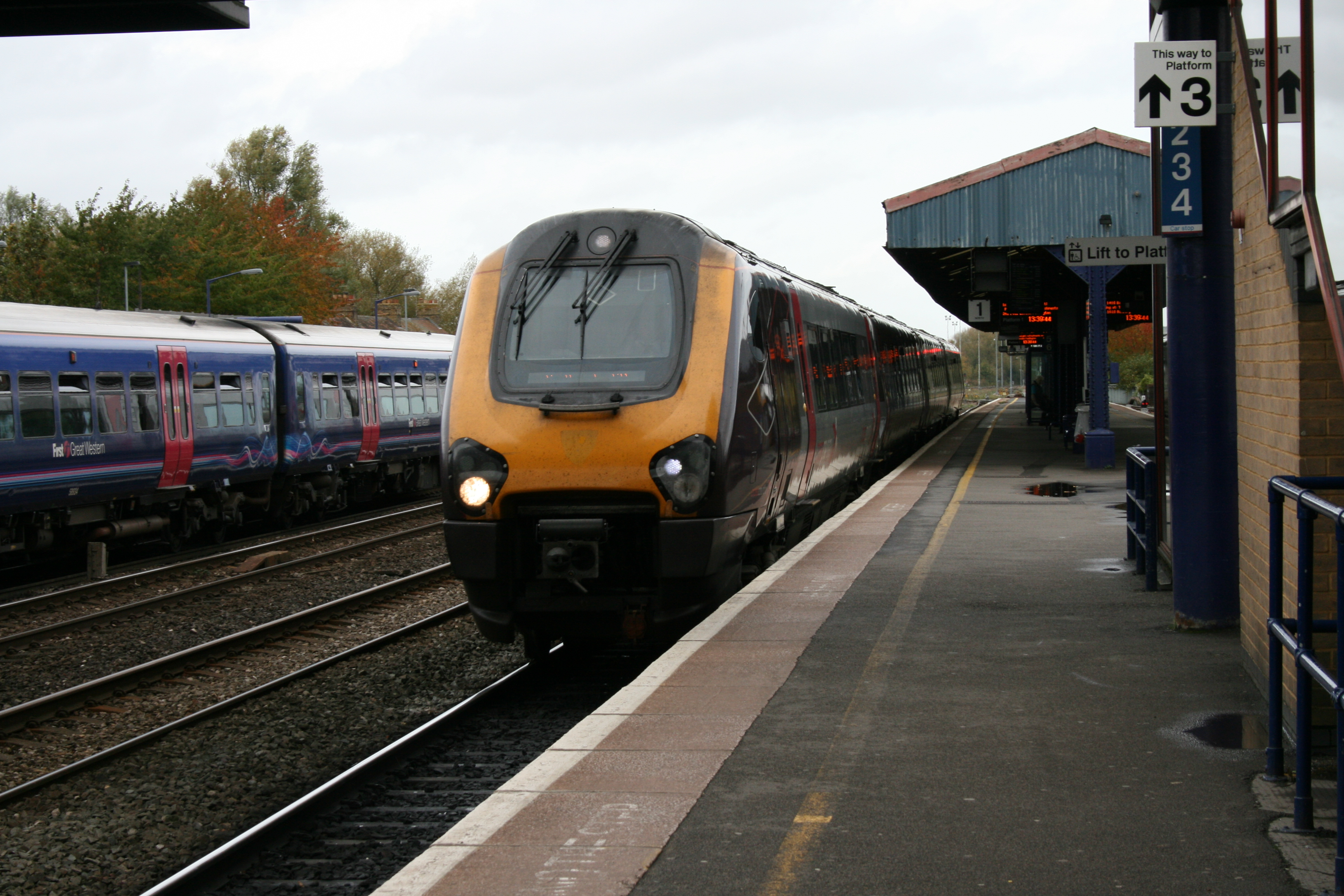
A CrossCountry Class 220 passing a GWR Class 165

Oxford station is served by three train operating companies:

- Great Western Railway run two fast trains per hour to London Paddington via Reading and two stopping services to Didcot Parkway. The stopping trains mainly originate here (a small number come from Banbury); however some fast trains continue to and from Worcester and Hereford. In May 2026, GWR commenced daily direct services to Bristol via Swindon and Bath Spa.
- Chiltern Railways runs two trains per hour to London Marylebone via High Wycombe, which are slower than the fast Great Western Railway services to London Paddington. It also provide a limited peak-hour service to Stratford-upon-Avon.
- CrossCountry operates trains once per hour between Bournemouth and Manchester Piccadilly, with occasional trains from Newcastle to Reading. All run via Birmingham New Street.

Preceding station	National Rail	Following station
Oxford Parkway	Chiltern Railways Oxford to Bicester Line	Terminus
Terminus	Chiltern Railways: Cherwell Valley Line; Limited Service	Tackley
Reading	CrossCountry Manchester to Reading	Banbury
Reading	CrossCountry Newcastle to Reading	Banbury
Didcot Parkway or Reading	Great Western Railway Cotswold Line	Hanborough or Terminus
Radley	Great Western Railway Cherwell Valley Line	Tackley
Swindon	Great Western Railway Oxford-Bristol	Terminus
	Future services	
Oxford Parkway	Chiltern Railways; East West Rail Oxford-Milton Keynes	Terminus
Historical railways
Wolvercot Platform Line open, station closed	Great Western Railway Cherwell Valley line	Hinksey Halt Line open, station closed

== See also ==
- Oxford Down Carriage Sidings, to the north of the station
