= Shipton-on-Cherwell Halt railway station =

Former railway station in England

Coordinates: 51.8525°N 1.3175°W

Shipton-on-Cherwell Halt
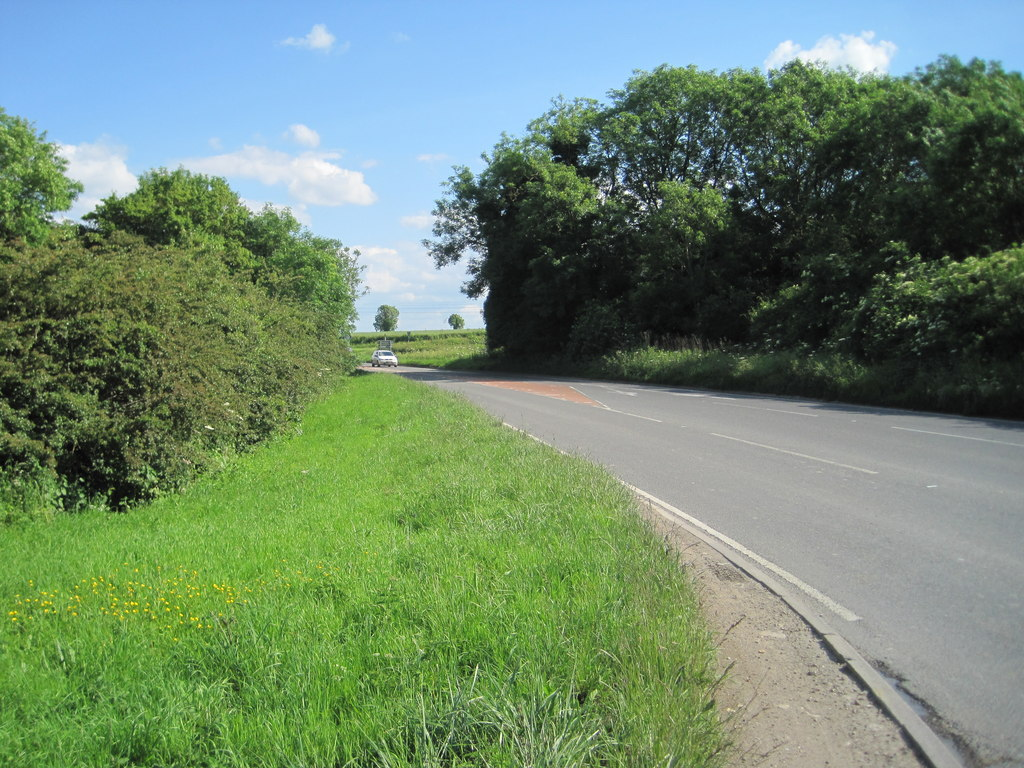
- The site of the station in 2014

General information
- Location: Shipton-on-Cherwell, Cherwell; England
- Grid reference: SP470173
- Platforms: 1

Other information
- Status: Disused

History
- Original company: Great Western Railway
- Post-grouping: GWR

Key dates
- 1 April 1929: Station opens
- 1 March 1954: Station closes
Location

Shipton-on-Cherwell Halt was a railway halt constructed in 1929 by the Great Western Railway to serve the Oxfordshire village of Shipton-on-Cherwell as well as the adjacent Oxford and Shipton Cement Company limestone quarry and cement works.

== History ==
Shipton-on-Cherwell Halt was one of 26 new halts opened by the Great Western Railway in 1929. It was situated on an embankment immediately adjacent to the single-span girder bridge over the A423 road. Facilities were basic: a short sleeper-built platform on the north side of the line, together with a small wooden shelter, running in board and two wooden lamp posts supporting traditional glass lanterns with ornamental finials. A sloping cinder path led down to the A423 where a sign proclaimed the halt as a station for "Blenheim, Oxford, Banbury, etc.". The halt was constructed at a cost of £160 with a low platform for railmotors. The platform was later raised to standard height in 1933 at a cost of £120.

The halt was opened to serve the community of cement workers employed by the Oxford & Shipton Cement Company which had opened a large quarry to the north of Shipton-on-Cherwell village. The company erected several rows of 1920s-style houses for its workers and this became known as "Bunkers Hill". In the absence of competing bus routes, the halt was soon carrying significant numbers of passengers between Bunkers Hill and Shipton old village, contributing to a rise in passenger numbers at Woodstock from 17,000 in the early 1900s to 22,000+ in the 1930s.

By the 1950s, rationalisation led to staff reductions on the line and the introduction of a modest timetable which saw eight services each way call at Shipton-on-Cherwell. Passenger numbers had fallen to 9,000, with each train carrying on average 5 to 6 passengers and sometimes empty. The last train ran on 27 February 1954 adorned with a wreath.

Preceding station	Disused railways	Following station
Kidlington; Line and station closed	Great Western Railway; Blenheim and Woodstock Branch Line	Blenheim & Woodstock; Line and station closed

== Present day ==
After closure, the halt remained untouched except for the removal of the nameboard until the lifting of the track in January 1958. By 1973, all that remained was a solitary rail which supported a notice against trespassing and the kissing gate by the roadside which was buried in brambles. Little now remains of the station.

== Bibliography ==
- Butt, R. V. J. (October 1995). The Directory of Railway Stations: details every public and private passenger station, halt, platform and stopping place, past and present (1st ed.). Sparkford: Patrick Stephens Ltd. ISBN 978-1-85260-508-7. OCLC 60251199. OL 11956311M.
- Jenkins, Stanley C. (1987). The Woodstock Branch. Didcot, Oxon: Wild Swan Publications. ISBN 0-906867-51-7.
- Jowett, Alan (2000). Jowett's Nationalised Railway Atlas (1st ed.). Penryn, Cornwall: Atlantic Transport Publishers. ISBN 978-0-906899-99-1. OCLC 228266687.
- Lingard, Richard (1973). The Woodstock Branch. Risinghurst, Oxford: Oxford Publishing Co. ISBN 0-902888-23-4.
- Searle, Muriel V. (1983). Lost lines : an anthology of Britain's lost railways. London: New Cavendish Books. ISBN 0-904568-41-5.
