= Bletchington railway station =

Disused railway station in Oxfordshire, England

Coordinates: 51.86059°N 1.30091°W

Bletchington
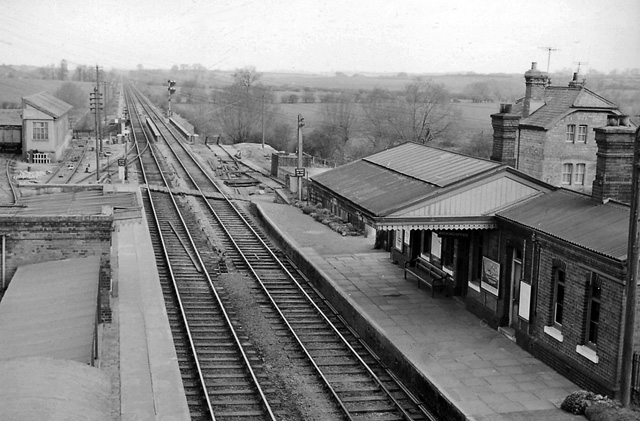
- The station in 1961

General information
- Location: Bletchington, Cherwell; England
- Grid reference: SP482182
- Platforms: 2

Other information
- Status: Disused

History
- Original company: Oxford and Rugby Railway
- Pre-grouping: Great Western Railway
- Post-grouping: GWR

Key dates
- 1850: Station opens
- 2 November 1964: Station closes for passengers
- 21 June 1965: closed for goods
Location

Bletchington railway station is a disused station in Oxfordshire at Enslow, England, a hamlet 1 1/4 miles (2 km) west of the village of Bletchingdon. The station had a number of names during its period of operation: 'Woodstock', 'Woodstock Road', 'Kirtlington' and finally 'Bletchington'.

== History ==
The Oxford and Rugby Railway planned a railway between those two points, which was authorised on 4 August 1845; construction began in 1846, but before any portion was open, it was absorbed by the Great Western Railway. The line opened as far as Banbury on 2 September 1850, and there were three intermediate stations, the southernmost being Woodstock Road. Upon the opening of a different station named Woodstock Road in 1855, this station was renamed Kirtlington; and following rebuilding it was renamed for a final time on 11 August 1890, becoming Bletchington. It is possible that the original name of this station was Woodstock, becoming Woodstock Road in May 1851 or 1852.

British Railways closed the station to passengers on 2 November 1964 and to goods on 21 June 1965. The station building survives but much of the station site is now occupied by an industrial estate.

Preceding station	Historical railways	Following station
Tackley; Line and station open	Great Western Railway; Oxford and Rugby Railway	Kidlington; Line open, station closed
