= Wolvercote Halt railway station =

Disused railway station in Oxfordshire, England

Coordinates: 51.7852°N 1.2797°W

Wolvercote Halt
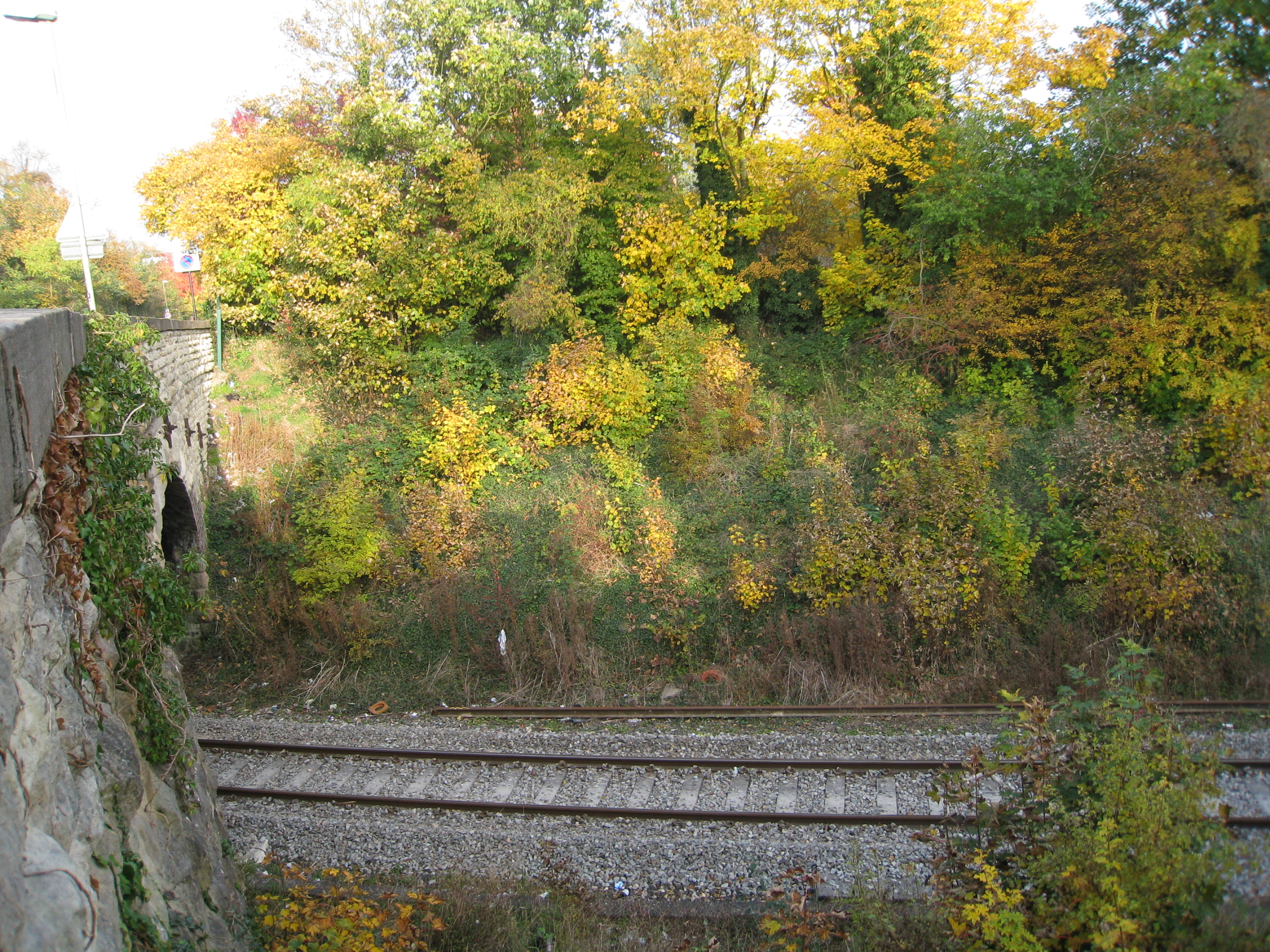
- Site of Wolvercote Halt

General information
- Location: Wolvercote, City of Oxford; England
- Grid reference: SP497098
- Platforms: 2

Other information
- Status: Disused

History
- Original company: London and North Western Railway
- Pre-grouping: London and North Western Railway
- Post-grouping: LMSR

Key dates
- 1905: Station opened
- 1 January 1917: closed
- 5 May 1919: opened
- 1926: Station closed
Location

Wolvercote Halt was a railway station at Upper Wolvercote near Oxford on the Varsity Line. The London and North Western Railway opened the halt in 1905 and the London, Midland and Scottish Railway closed it in 1926. It was situated on the southern side of First Turn.

== Route ==
Preceding station	Historical railways	Following station
Port Meadow Halt; Line open; Station closed	London and North Western Railway; Varsity Line	Oxford Road Halt; Line open; Station closed

== See also ==
- Wolvercot Platform

== Sources ==
- Wolvercote Halt on Disused Stations
- Butt, R. V. J. (October 1995). The Directory of Railway Stations: details every public and private passenger station, halt, platform and stopping place, past and present (1st ed.). Sparkford: Patrick Stephens Ltd. ISBN 978-1-85260-508-7. OCLC 60251199. OL 11956311M.
- Jowett, Alan (March 1989). Jowett's Railway Atlas of Great Britain and Ireland: From Pre-Grouping to the Present Day (1st ed.). Sparkford: Patrick Stephens Ltd. ISBN 978-1-85260-086-0. OCLC 22311137.
- Jowett, Alan (2000). Jowett's Nationalised Railway Atlas (1st ed.). Penryn, Cornwall: Atlantic Transport Publishers. ISBN 978-0-906899-99-1. OCLC 228266687.
