= Tackley railway station =

Railway station in Oxfordshire, England

Tackley
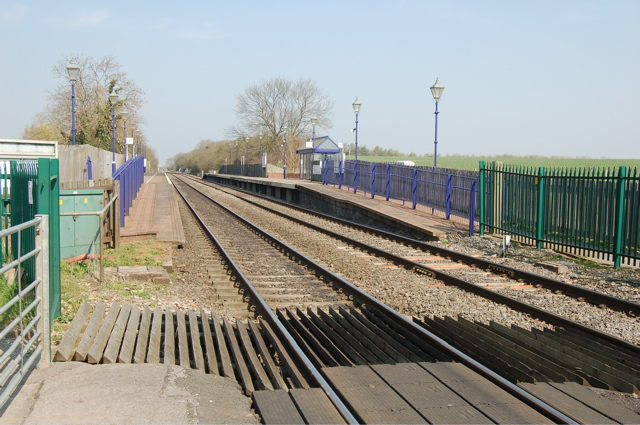

General information
- Location: Tackley, West Oxfordshire; England
- Coordinates: 51.881°N 1.297°W
- Grid reference: SP484205
- Manager: Great Western Railway
- Platforms: 2

Other information
- Station code: TAC
- Classification: DfT category F2

History
- Opened: 6 April 1931
- Original company: Great Western Railway
- Post-grouping: Great Western Railway

Passengers
- 2021/22: ▲14,574
- 2022/23: ▲20,898
- 2023/24: ▲21,374
- 2024/25: ▲25,334
- 2025/26: ▲27,510
Location
Notes
- Passenger statistics from the Office of Rail and Road

Tackley railway station is on the Cherwell Valley Line in Oxfordshire, England, serving the village of Tackley and its surrounding area. Great Western Railway operates the station and all but one of the trains serving it. The exception is a weekday late night service to Banbury operated by Chiltern Railways.

Measured via Didcot Parkway the station is 72 miles 50 chains (116.9 km) from London Paddington.

== History ==
When the Oxford – Banbury section of the Oxford and Rugby Railway opened in 1850 the nearest station was Woodstock Road, which was at Enslow 1.5 miles (2.4 km) south of Tackley. In the 1930s, in response to increasing competition from bus services, the Great Western Railway opened a number of new halts. One of these was Tackley, which was opened on 6 April 1931.

== Services ==
Most services at Tackley are operated by Great Western Railway, with a very limited service operated by Chiltern Railways.

The typical off-peak service is one train every two hours in each direction between Didcot Parkway and Banbury, operated by Great Western Railway. Additional services call at the station during the peak hours. The station is also served by a single late evening service from Oxford to Banbury, operated by Chiltern Railways on weekdays only.

On Sundays, the station is served by three Great Western Railway services in each direction between Oxford and Banbury during the summer months (between May and September) only. No services call at the station on Sundays during the winter months.

Preceding station	National Rail	Following station
Oxford	Great Western Railway Cherwell Valley Line	Heyford
Oxford	Chiltern Railways Cherwell Valley Line Limited Service	Heyford
Historical railways
Bletchington Line open, station closed	Great Western Railway Oxford and Rugby Railway	Heyford Line and station open

== Level crossing ==
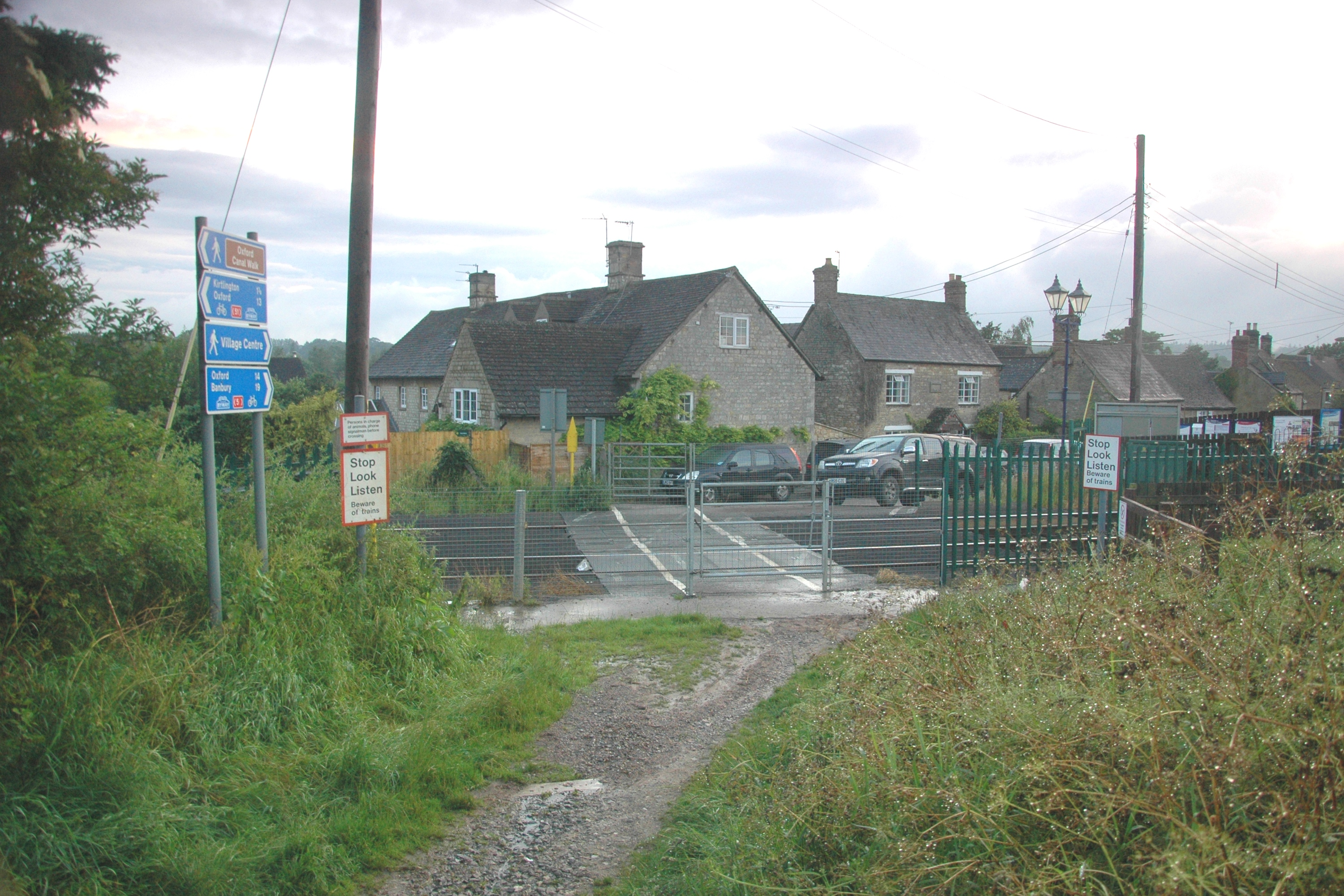
Tackley crossing no longer has gates for motor vehicles; only pedestrians, equestrians and cyclists can use it

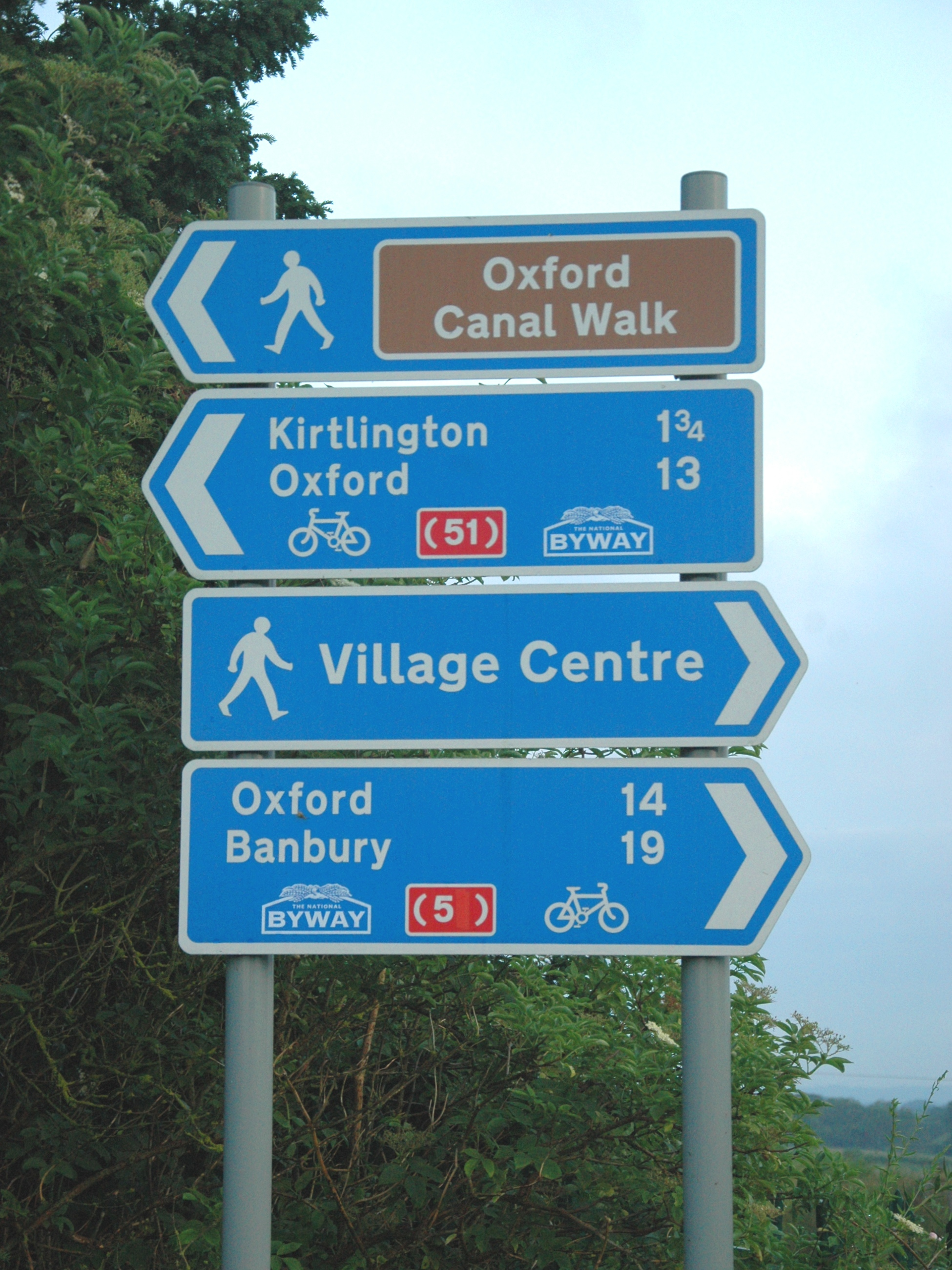
Some of the signs on the east side of Tackley crossing

The GWR sited Tackley halt just north of a level crossing on the road linking Tackley with the village of Kirtlington. This had a crossing keeper on duty 24 hours a day and the gates were interlocked with the railway signalling system. However, the route later ceased to be a through road between the two villages, so the railway company withdrew the crossing keeper and redesignated the crossing to be operated by its users.

It was then made an occupation crossing and the only vehicles allowed to use it were those authorised to have access to Tackley Estate. It had large gates for vehicles and small ones for pedestrians. This was still the case in 2009, but by 2012 the large gates had been replaced by fences and the surface for vehicles to cross the tracks had been removed (see photo).

The crossing is used by a bridleway linking Tackley and Kirtlington, which is now also part of National Cycle Route 51. The crossing is also the only passenger access to and from the "up" platform (i.e. for trains from Banbury or to Oxford, Reading and London). As of 2009 Network Rail had 165 unprotected level crossings related to its stations, 26 of which were defined as "user-worked" or "footpath crossings". However, Tackley crossing is the only one that combines station access with a public bridleway.

=== Bridge and subway proposals ===
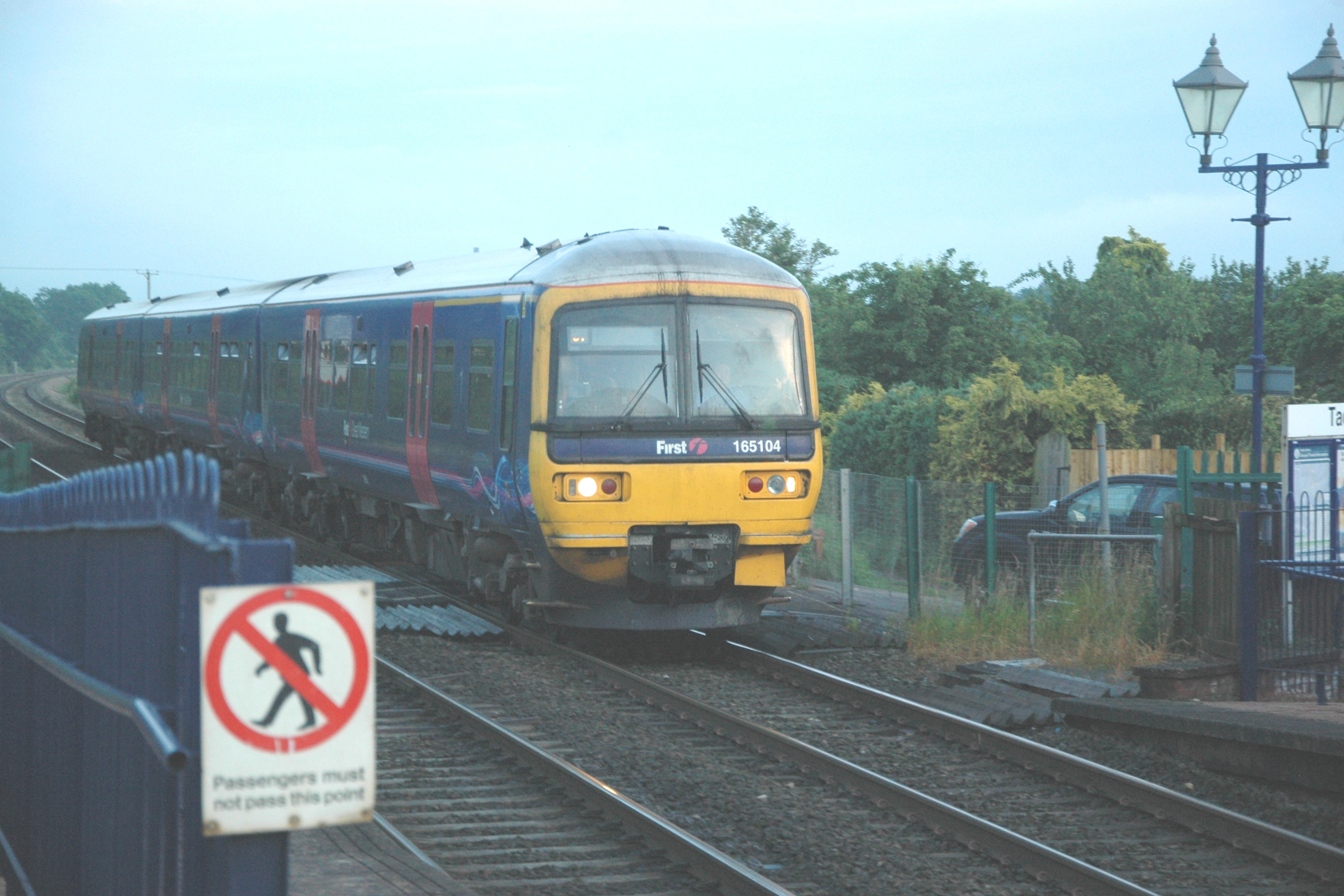
A First Great Western Class 165 train from Oxford to Banbury passing through the crossing into Tackley station

In 1999 Railtrack plc launched its Reading – Birmingham Cross Country Route Modernisation Project, which was to increase maximum speeds from 90 miles per hour (140 km/h) to 110 miles per hour (180 km/h) ready for Virgin CrossCountry's plan to introduce its new Voyager trains in 2002 (Operation Princess). Higher train speeds would increase the risk of a train colliding with someone on a user-worked level crossing, so in 2000 Railtrack asked West Oxfordshire District Council (WODC) for planning permission to build a footbridge. The bridge would serve passengers and other pedestrians but not vehicles, so the level crossing would have to remain.

In 2001 WODC refused planning permission for a footbridge purely because of its appearance. The council declared "that the proposed footbridge will, by reason of its size, design and use of materials represent an alien, incongruous and overtly urban feature in this rural location". In 2002 Railtrack responded by requesting planning permission for a subway under the railway for pedestrians, equestrians and cyclists. Railtrack and the Tackley Estate agreed an alternative route for vehicular access, and thus it would be possible to close the crossing completely. Because of the topography of the site, the subway would have to be 90 metres (300 ft) south of Tackley station. WODC again refused planning permission, this time asserting "the design's failure to make safe and convenient provision for horses, their riders, pedestrians, cyclists, the elderly and disabled people; and that the subway would appear as an unduly prominent and intrusive feature in the rural scene". Oxfordshire County Council supported WODC's refusal.

At the same time the Department for Transport removed Railtrack from controlling Britain's rail network. The DfT created a new company, by Network Rail (NR), which revised the subway proposal and lodged a planning appeal against WODC's refusal of planning permission for it. A planning inspector visited the crossing and, unlike WODC, commented that the subway would improve access to and from the "up" platform for passengers with some types of disability. In July 2003 the inspector upheld NR's appeal and granted planning permission for the subway.

However, in September 2002 Virgin CrossCountry had already introduced its accelerated timetable and by July 2003 NR had nearly finished the CrossCountry Route Modernisation, but without increasing train speeds through Tackley station. NR was drawing the project to a close and it did not implement the plan for a subway at Tackley. The planning permission was valid for five years and lapsed, unused, in July 2008.

=== Fatality and near miss ===
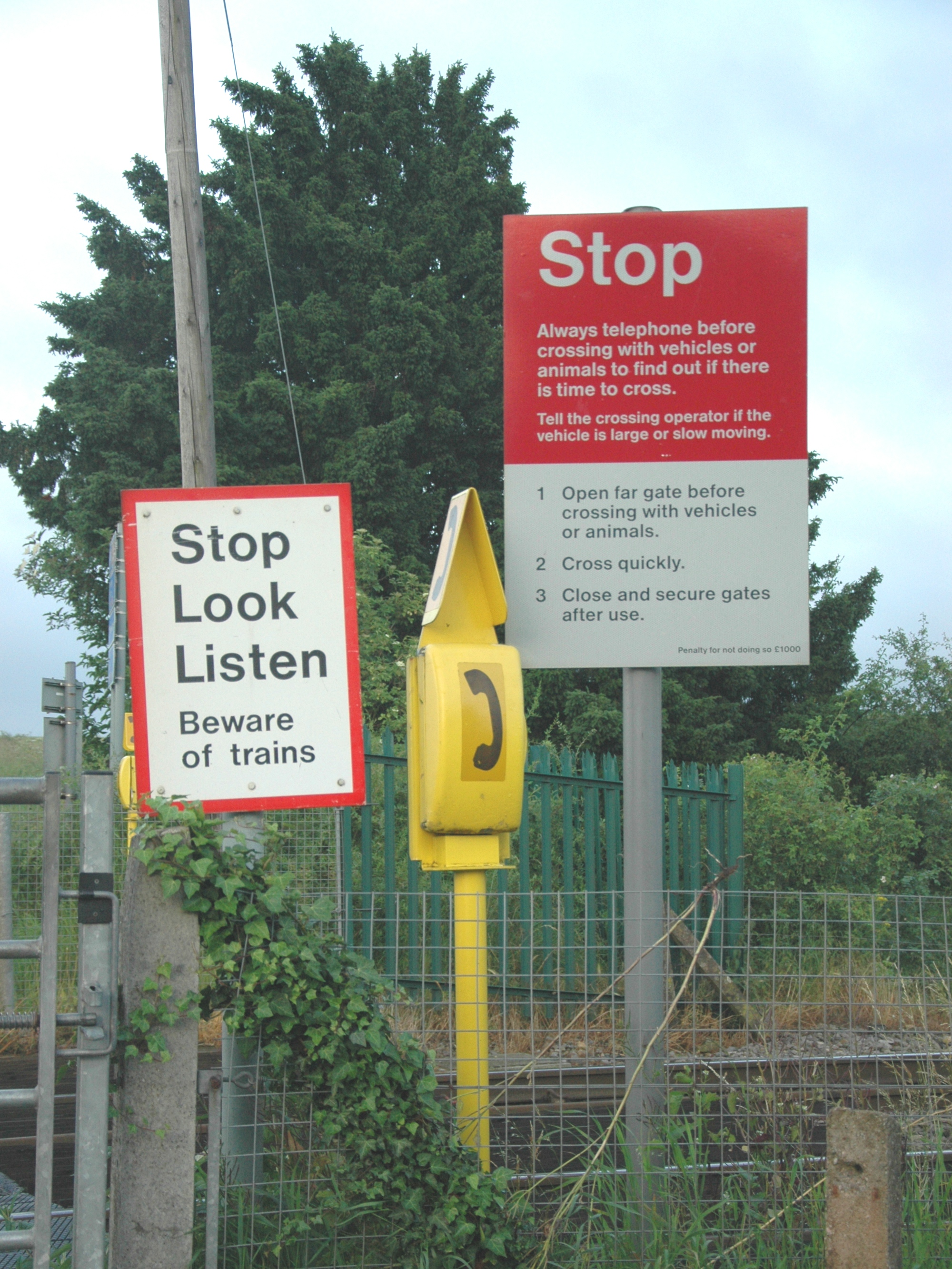
Warning signs and telephone to the signalling control centre on the west side of the crossing

On 31 March 2008 Margaret Evans, an 82-year-old Tackley resident, was struck and killed by a CrossCountry Voyager train while she was crossing to the up platform to catch a local train to Oxford. On 16 February 2009 another CrossCountry Voyager train had a near miss with someone using Tackley crossing.

The Rail Accident Investigation Branch (RAIB) found that the immediate cause of the 2008 fatality was that Mrs Evans stepped into the path of the express train. However, the RAIB also identified a problem with the "decision point", i.e. the place at which a user would decide where to cross relative to the track and identified WODC's refusal of planning permission for an alternative, safer crossing as an "underlying factor" in the accident.

=== Closure of crossing ===
The crossing was eventually closed in April 2020, replaced by a temporary footbridge at the Banbury end of the platform.

== Sources ==
- RAIB (March 2009). Fatal accident at Tackley Station level crossing, 31 March 2008. Rail Accident Report. Vol. 09/2009. Derby: Rail Accident Investigation Branch, Department for Transport.
