= Blenheim and Woodstock railway station =

Disused railway station in Woodstock, Oxfordshire

Coordinates: 51.84686°N 1.35199°W

Blenheim & Woodstock
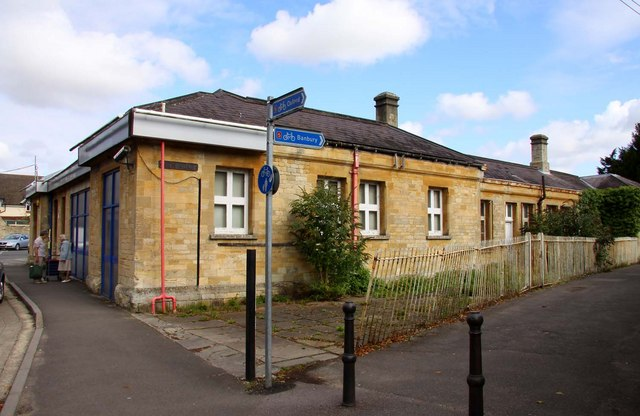
- The former stations buildings in 2009

General information
- Location: Woodstock, West Oxfordshire; England
- Grid reference: SP446167
- Platforms: 1

Other information
- Status: Disused

History
- Original company: Woodstock Railway
- Pre-grouping: Great Western Railway
- Post-grouping: GWR

Key dates
- 19 May 1890: Station opens
- 1 March 1954: Station closes
Location

Blenheim & Woodstock was a railway station constructed in the neoclassical style which served the town of Woodstock and Blenheim Palace in the English county of Oxfordshire. The station, as well as the line, was constructed by the Duke of Marlborough and was privately run until 1897 when it became part of the Great Western Railway. The number of trains serving the station was cut in the late 1930s, and again in 1952 down to only six trains a day. The last train ran on 27 February 1954 adorned with a wreath.

The station building was initially converted into a garage and petrol station. Then the forecourt of the site was no longer used as a petrol station, but for used car sales only with a building company using some of the land behind the station. There were proposals for demolishing the building to make space for housing, but the district council rejected them as "The former station building makes a positive contribution to the character and appearance of the Woodstock Conservation Area." Approval was given only after the plans included retaining the station building.

In 2013 the land behind the station building was built on as a small estate of high specification houses, and the station building was retained with no major changes to the main structure but small changes to the detail. It is now used as small offices and commercial premises. The forecourt is a small landscaped garden.

The station from the rails side

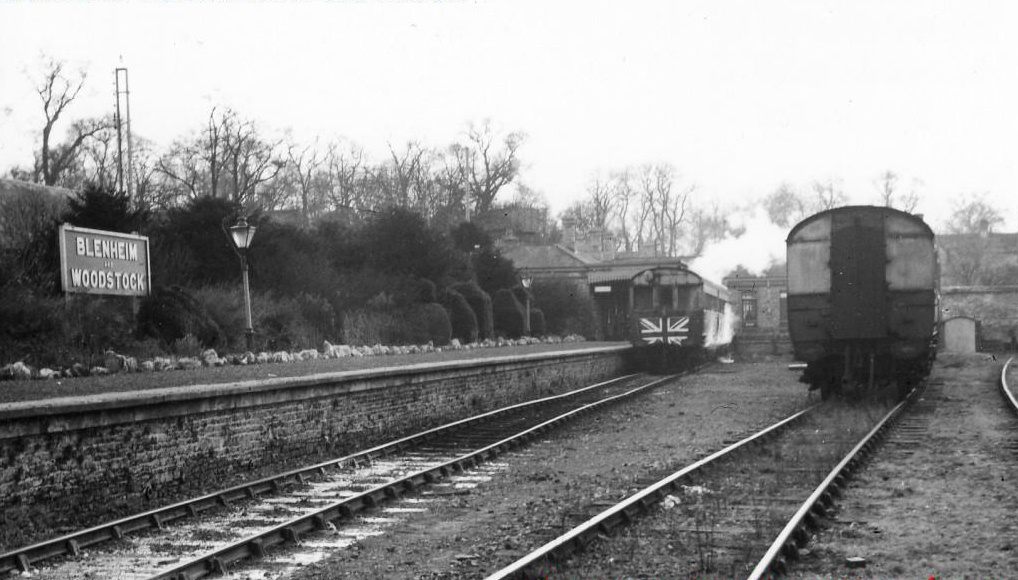
Last day of service in 1954

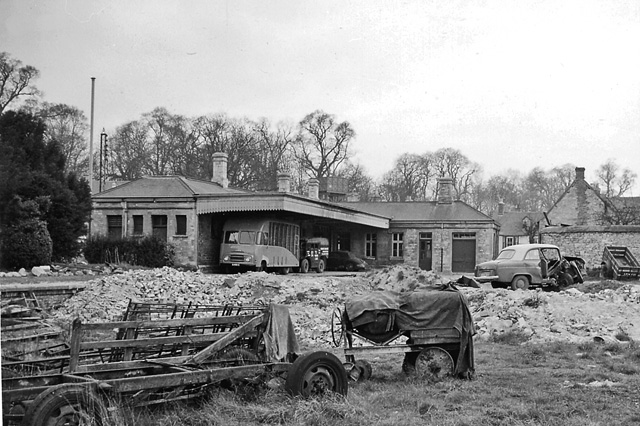
The remains of the station in 1961

== Routes ==
Preceding station	Disused railways	Following station
Shipton-on-Cherwell Halt; Line and station closed	Great Western Railway; Blenheim and Woodstock Branch Line	Terminus
