= Oxford and Rugby Railway =

Overview
- Status: Historical
- Owner: Great Western Railway
- Locale: South East England
- Termini: Oxford; Rugby

Service
- Type: Rural
- System: Great Western Railway
- Operator: Great Western Railway

History
- Opened: 2 September 1850 (Oxford to Banbury); 1 October 1852 (to Knightcote)

Technical
- Line length: About 32 miles (51 km)
- Number of tracks: 2
- Track gauge: 7 ft 1/4 in (2,140 mm); 4 ft 8 1/2 in (1,435 mm) standard gauge (Dual gauge)

The Oxford and Rugby Railway was promoted by the Great Western Railway as a means of connecting to the West Midlands and the north of England, by joining existing railways at Rugby. It was authorised in 1845, but the GWR soon decided to make its own line to Birmingham, and in 1846 it acquired the O&RR; work had not started on its construction. In the same year the GWR obtained an act of Parliament, the Birmingham and Oxford Junction Railway Act 1846, giving authorisation for its Birmingham line. The two railways were treated as a single project, to connect Birmingham and Oxford. In 1850 a single line was opened between Oxford and Banbury, and in 1852 the whole line to Birmingham was opened.

The line continues in use at the present day, as an important trunk route.

== Origin ==
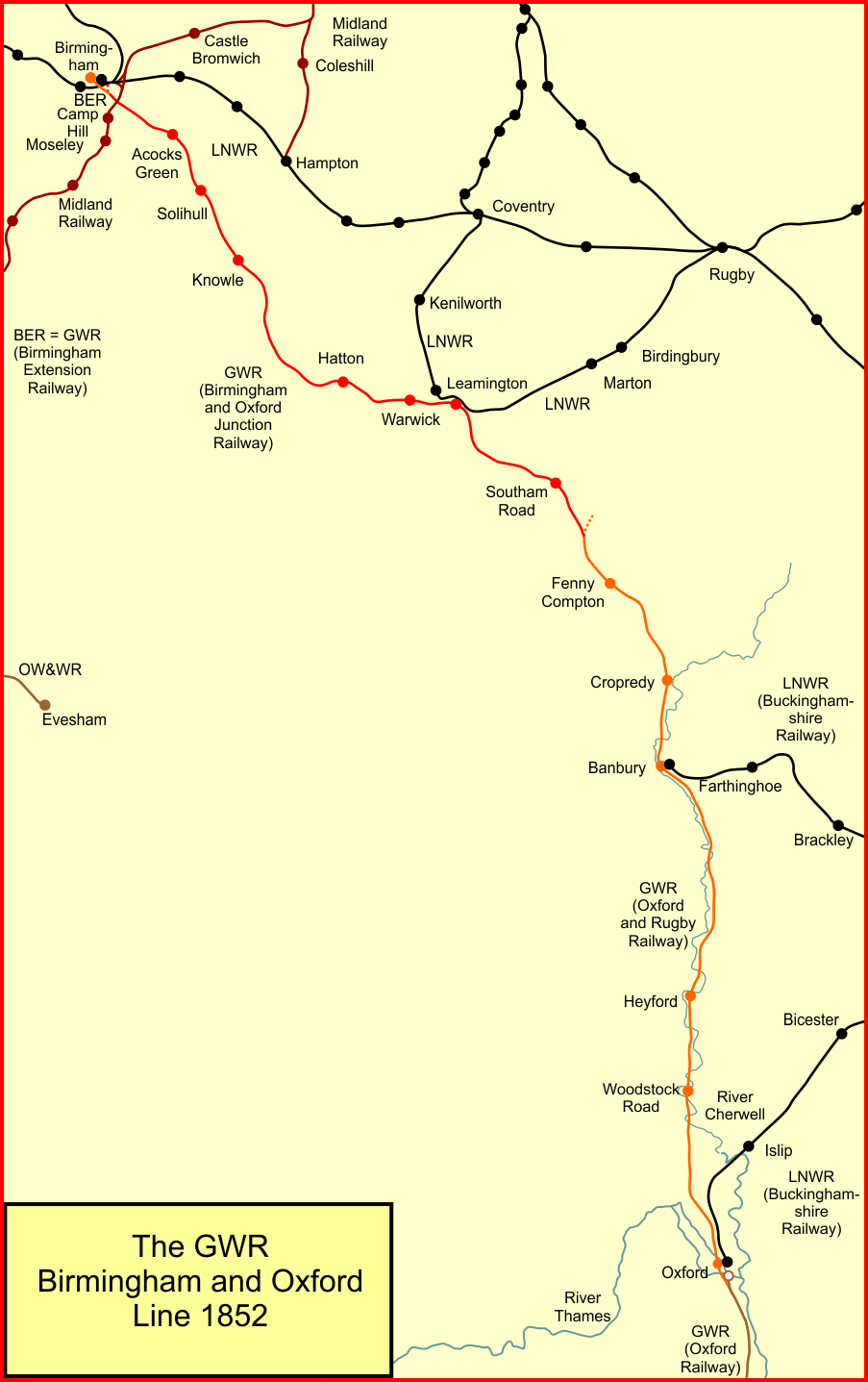
The Birmingham and Oxford line in 1852

In the mid-1840s the Great Western Railway had established its network in the south of England, but wished to connect northwards, to the industries of the West Midlands and the north-west of England.

It had reached Oxford on 12 June 1844 by means of an affiliated railway, the Oxford Railway, from Didcot. The Oxford terminus of that line was south of the River Thames, near Folly Bridge. At the time Rugby was a key railway centre, with lines radiating northward: the Midland Counties Railway and the London and Birmingham Railway connected there, forming the only routes to the north. If the GWR could reach Rugby, then it could secure the northern connections it desired.

== Authorisation ==
Oxford and Rugby Railway Act 1845
- Act of Parliament
- Parliament of the United Kingdom
- Long title: An Act for making a Railway from the City of Oxford to the Town of Rugby.
- Citation: 8 & 9 Vict. c. clxxxviii

Dates
- Royal assent: 4 August 1845

Text of statute as originally enacted

Accordingly, the Oxford and Rugby Railway was promoted by the GWR. It would run from a junction with the Oxford Railway line south of Oxford, with a new, through, Oxford station nearer to the centre of the city, through Banbury and Fenny Compton to a junction with the London and Birmingham Railway at Rugby. The Oxford and Rugby Railway Act 1845 (8 & 9 Vict. c. clxxxviii) was given royal assent on 4 August 1845. The GWR and the Oxford Railway were broad gauge lines, and the GWR naturally wished the O&RR to be the same, but Parliament inserted a requirement that mixed gauge must be provided if demanded by the Board of Trade.

And be it enacted, That the said Railway shall commence by a Junction with the Oxford Branch of the Great Western Railway either in the Liberty of Grand Pont and Parish of Saint Aldate in the City of Oxford and Counties of Oxford and Berks, or some or One of them, or in the Parish of South Hinksey in the Liberty of the City of Oxford and the County of Berks, and shall pass through the following Places, or some of them, (that is to say,) South Hinksey, North Hinksey, in the County of Berks; Saint Aldate, Saint Thomas, in the Counties of Oxford and Berks, or One of them; Saint Giles in the County of Oxford; Port Meadow in the County of Oxford, or Port Meadow in the Parish of Binsey, and Saint Giles in the Liberty of the City of Oxford; Wolvercot, Yarnton, Kidlington, Begbrook or Begbroke, Hampton Gay, Shipton, Bletchington or Bletchingdon, Kirtlington, Tackley, Rousham or Rouseham, Lower Heyford, Upper Heyford, Steeple Aston, Somerton, Fritwell, Souldern, Adderbury, Banbury, Neithrop, Bourton, Cropredy, Claydon, and Clattercote, in the County of Oxford; Aynho, King's Sutton, Warkworth, Middleton Cheney, in the County of Northampton; Farnborough, Fenny Compton, Burton Dassett, Knightcote, Watergall, Bishops Itchington otherwise Upper Itchington, Ladbrook, Chapel Ascot, Southam, Napton otherwise Napton-on-the-Hill, Stockton, Leamington Hastings, Dunchurch, Thurleston, Bilton, Hill Moreton, Clifton-upon-Dunsmore, and Rugby, all in the County of Warwick; and shall terminate at or near the Point of Junction of the London and Birmingham and Midland Railways at or near Rugby in the Parish of Rugby in the County of Warwick. — Section 20, Oxford and Rugby Railway Act 1845 (8 & 9 Vict. c. clxxxviii)

== Taken over by the GWR ==
The Oxford and Rugby Railway was taken over by the Great Western Railway by the terms of the Great Western Railway Act 1846 (9 & 10 Vict. c. xiv) of 14 May 1846.

== Grand Junction Railway involvement ==
The Grand Junction Railway ran northwards from Birmingham to connect with the Liverpool and Manchester Railway, and now it sought a southward connection so as to extend its network. It connected with the London and Birmingham Railway, but found the L&BR a difficult business partner, and it wanted a line independent of the L&BR. The GWR naturally welcomed the GJR approach, which would bring it income from the GJR traffic.

The GJR was a narrow (standard) gauge railway; at this early stage in railway history, there was no certainty about a national track gauge, and the GJR stated that it would convert its existing network to the broad gauge so as to enable through running with the GWR. This may have been simply a negotiating tactic with the L&BR. The GJR saw that the Oxford and Rugby Railway was in Parliament in the 1845 session, and the GJR altered its own proposal to join the Oxford and Rugby line at Knightcote, north of Fenny Compton, saving several miles of construction.

The necessity of building the line from Birmingham was based on the presumed impossibility of working with the London and Birmingham Railway, but very soon relations between the GJR and the L&BR normalised. The GJR saw that it could now make its London connections over the L&BR without building a new line, and it cancelled any commitment to the line to join the Oxford and Rugby Railway. The GJR and the L&BR, together with the Manchester and Birmingham Railway, amalgamated to form the London and North Western Railway on 16 July 1846.

== Construction ==
The construction contract for the Oxford and Rugby Railway was let in the autumn of 1845, but there was considerable delay in getting possession of the land, and the contractor failed, and had to be replaced. The construction work was concentrated on the line as far as Fenny Compton, "at which point, it seems, the Directors had already decided to stop". Shortage of funds resulted in the progress of the work being very slow, and in 1849 "it had definitely been decided not to proceed farther than the point of junction with the Birmingham and Oxford [Junction] Railway, two miles beyond Fenny Compton, and to abandon the remaining 15 1/2 miles to Rugby, on which no work had been done".

== Birmingham and Oxford Junction Railway ==
In the face of the Grand Junction Railway leaving the consortium to build from Birmingham, the GWR and the other parties interested in the line decided to proceed anyway, and the scheme became known as the Birmingham and Oxford Junction Railway. The London and Birmingham Railway (and its successor the LNWR) resorted to a series of spoiling tactics in Parliament intended to undermine the case for the line, but after a considerable struggle royal assent was given to the Birmingham and Oxford Junction Railway Act 1846 (9 & 10 Vict. c. cccxxxvii) on 3 August 1846.

== A single project ==
As the Oxford and Rugby Railway had already been incorporated into the GWR, the whole scheme – Oxford and Rugby Railway (to Fenny Compton) and Birmingham and Oxford Junction Railway was treated as a single GWR project, to build the Birmingham and Oxford line.

== Partial opening ==
As construction proceeded the company decided to open a single line from Oxford to Banbury on the broad gauge, but the London and North Western Railway demanded that mixed gauge be provided, as laid down in the Oxford and Rugby Railway Act 1845, even though at this stage there was no prospect of running narrow (standard) gauge trains. After considerable deliberation by the Board of Trade commissioners, the line was opened to Banbury on 2 September 1850 as a broad gauge single line.

== Opening, and the present ==
Construction continued, and the line was opened throughout in 1852.

At the present day the Oxford and Rugby Railway section is a part of the Oxford to Birmingham line, an important main line.
