= List of local nature reserves in Oxfordshire =

Local nature reserves (LNRs) in England are designated by local authorities under Section 21 of the National Parks and Access to the Countryside Act 1949. LNRs are sites which have a special local interest either biologically or geologically. Local authorities have a duty to care for them, and must control the sites by owning or leasing them, or by having an agreement with the owners. The local authorities can apply local byelaws to manage and protect LNRs.

As of February 2020, there are fifteen LNRs in Oxfordshire, a county in South East England with an area of 2,605 square kilometres and a population of 648,700.

== Key ==
=== Other designations and wildlife trust management ===
- GCR = Geological Conservation Review site
- SSSI = Site of Special Scientific Interest

== Sites ==
| Site | Photograph | Area (Note: The area and grid reference are on the "Details" page on each site in the Natural England database of local nature reserves.) | Location (Note: The location is taken from the Natural England details page for the site.) | District | Other | Map (Note: The maps are on the Natural England database of local nature reserves.) and details | Description |
|---|---|---|---|---|---|---|---|
| Abbey Fishponds | | 5.6 hectares (14 acres) | Abingdon; 51.678°N 1.262°W; SU 511 980 | Vale of White Horse | | Map and Details | |
| Adderbury Lakes | Adderbury Lakes | 1.8 hectares (4.4 acres) | Adderbury; 52.016°N 1.306°W; SP 477 355 | Cherwell | | Map and Details | The lakes were created by Capability Brown in about 1768 as part of the landscaping of the grounds of Adderbury House. The reserve also includes woodland around the lakes and there is diverse wildlife. |
| Bure Park | Bure Park | 8.4 hectares (21 acres) | Bicester; 51.909°N 1.161°W; SP 578 237 | Cherwell | | Map and Details | The River Bure runs through the park and supplies water to a pond which has great crested newts. Habitats include grassland, scrub, broadleaved woodland and hedges. |
| Crecy Hill | Crecy Hill | 0.8 hectares (2.0 acres) | Tackley; 51.887°N 1.230°W; SP 483 212 | West Oxfordshire | | Map and Details | This steeply sloping limestone bank has a calcareous grassland habitat. More than 100 wild flower species and 15 grasses have been recorded. There are also more than 100 insect species, including 20 butterflies such as the small blue. |
| Cuttle Brook | Cuttle Brook | 13.0 hectares (32 acres) | Thame; 51.745°N 0.986°W; SP 701 056 | South Oxfordshire | | Map and Details | There are seven entrances to this site close to Thame town centre. It has diverse habitats, including the brook and its banks, scrub, woodland, meadows, reed beds, hedges and sedge beds. |
| Ewelme Watercress Beds | Ewelme Watercress Beds | 2.6 hectares (6.4 acres) | Wallingford; 51.621°N 1.078°W; SU 639 917 | South Oxfordshire | | Map and Details | A stream runs through these former watercress beds, fed by a spring. Wildlife includes water voles, together with diverse invertebrates and plants. |
| Kirtlington Quarry | Kirtlington Quarry | 7.4 hectares (18 acres) | Kirtlington; 51.875°N 1.285°W; SP 493 198 | Cherwell | GCR, SSSI | Map and Details | Britain has the only five Middle Jurassic mammal sites in the world, and this disused quarry has yielded the richest and most diverse assemblage. It dates to the Upper Bathonian, around 150 million years ago. There are nine therian and prototherians species, together with a tritylodontid. There are also fossils of theropod dinosaurs, crocodilians, pterosaurs, fishes and many shark teeth. |
| Lye Valley | Lye Valley | 4.5 hectares (11 acres) | Headington; 51.748°N 1.209°W; SP 547 058 | Oxford | SSSI | Map and Details | This a calcareous valley fen, which is a nationally rare and threatened habitat. It is drained by the Lye Brook. There is a variety of moss species, such as Drepanocladus revolvens and Campylium stellatum. Invertebrates include the nationally rare soldier fly, Vanoyia tenuicornis and the uncommon spiders, Xysticus ulmi and Anistea elegans. |
| Magdalen Quarry | | 0.4 hectares (0.99 acres) | Oxford; 51.760°N 1.203°W; SP 551 071 | Oxford | GCR, SSSI | Map and Details | |
| Mowbray Fields | Mowbray Fields | 2.2 hectares (5.4 acres) | Didcot; 51.595°N 1.246°W; SU 523 887 | South Oxfordshire | | Map and Details | This nature reserve next to the Hagbourne Brook has a wildflower meadow, a disused railway embankment, a pond and wetland. There are many common spotted and southern marsh orchids, and more than 200 species of invertebrates have been recorded. |
| Rock Edge | Rock Edge | 1.8 hectares (4.4 acres) | Oxford; 51.754°N 1.206°W; SP 549 064 | Oxford | GCR, SSSI | Map and Details | This site exposes limestone rich in coral called Coral rag, laid down when the area was under a warm, shallow sea, similar to the Bahama Banks today. It is rich in fossils derived from the coral reefs. It dates to the Upper Jurassic, around 145 million years ago. |
| Saltway | Saltway | 2.0 hectares (4.9 acres) | Chipping Norton; 51.873°N 1.444°W; SP 384 195 | West Oxfordshire | SSSI | Map and Details | This is a stretch of an ancient track together with its species-rich grass verges and hedges. It has been designated an SSSI because it has the largest known British colony of the very rare downy woundwort, with more than 100 seedlings and 60 flowering stems. The plant is associated with hedges along Roman roads and ancient tracks on calcareous soils, and Salt Way may date to the Roman period. |
| The Slade | | 2.1 hectares (5.2 acres) | Bloxham; 52.015°N 1.388°W; SP 421 354 | Cherwell | | Map and Details | |
| Tuckmill Meadows | | 5.7 hectares (14 acres) | Shrivenham; 51.607°N 1.656°W; SU 239 899 | Vale of White Horse | SSSI | Map and Details | |
| Watlington Chalk Pit | Watlington Chalk Pit | 1.6 hectares (4.0 acres) | Watlington; 51.640°N 0.991°W; SU 699 940 | South Oxfordshire | SSSI | Map and Details | This site has floristically rich chalk grassland and scrub. There are many lichens, mosses and liverworts, and twenty species of butterfly have been recorded. Wintering birds include fieldfares, redwings, yellowhammer and linnets. |

== See also ==
- List of Sites of Special Scientific Interest in Oxfordshire
- Berkshire, Buckinghamshire and Oxfordshire Wildlife Trust
