= Haddenham =

Haddenham may refer to:

- Haddenham, Buckinghamshire, a village in England
  - Haddenham Junior School
  - Haddenham St Mary's Church of England School
  - Haddenham and Thame Parkway railway station
  - Haddenham (Bucks) railway station, a former station in Buckinghamshire, England
  - Haddenham-Thame Greenway, to link Haddenham in Bucks, with Thame in Oxfordshire
- Haddenham, Cambridgeshire, a village in England
  - Haddenham railway station, a former station in Cambridgeshire, England
