= Cuttle Brook (south) =

Watercourse in Oxfordshire, England

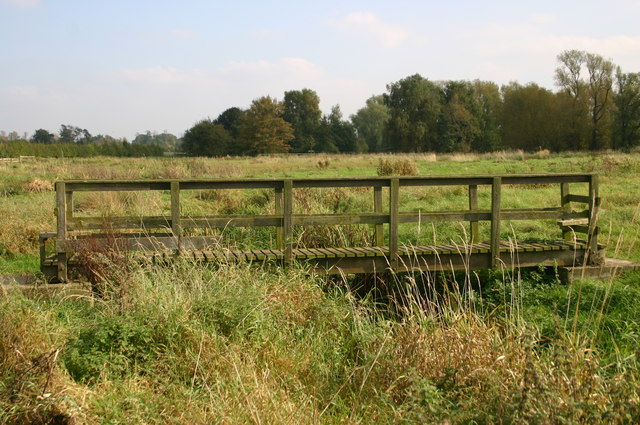

Location
- Country: England
- County: Oxfordshire

Physical characteristics
- Source
  - location: west of Chinnor
  - coordinates: 51°42′14″N 0°55′24″W
- Mouth
  - location: northwest of Thame in the River Thame
  - coordinates: 51°45′11″N 0°59′19″W
- Length: 8.5 km (5.3 mi)
- Basin size: 28.264 km^{2} (10.913 sq mi)

The Cuttle Brook is a watercourse in Oxfordshire, England. It originates from several short unnamed tributaries west of Chinnor and flows in a northwesterly direction until it flows into the River Thame on the northwestern edge of Thame. It flows through Thame, where it forms the Cuttle Brook Nature Reserve.
