= Adderbury Lakes =

Local nature reserve in Oxfordshire, England

Coordinates: 52.016°N 1.306°W

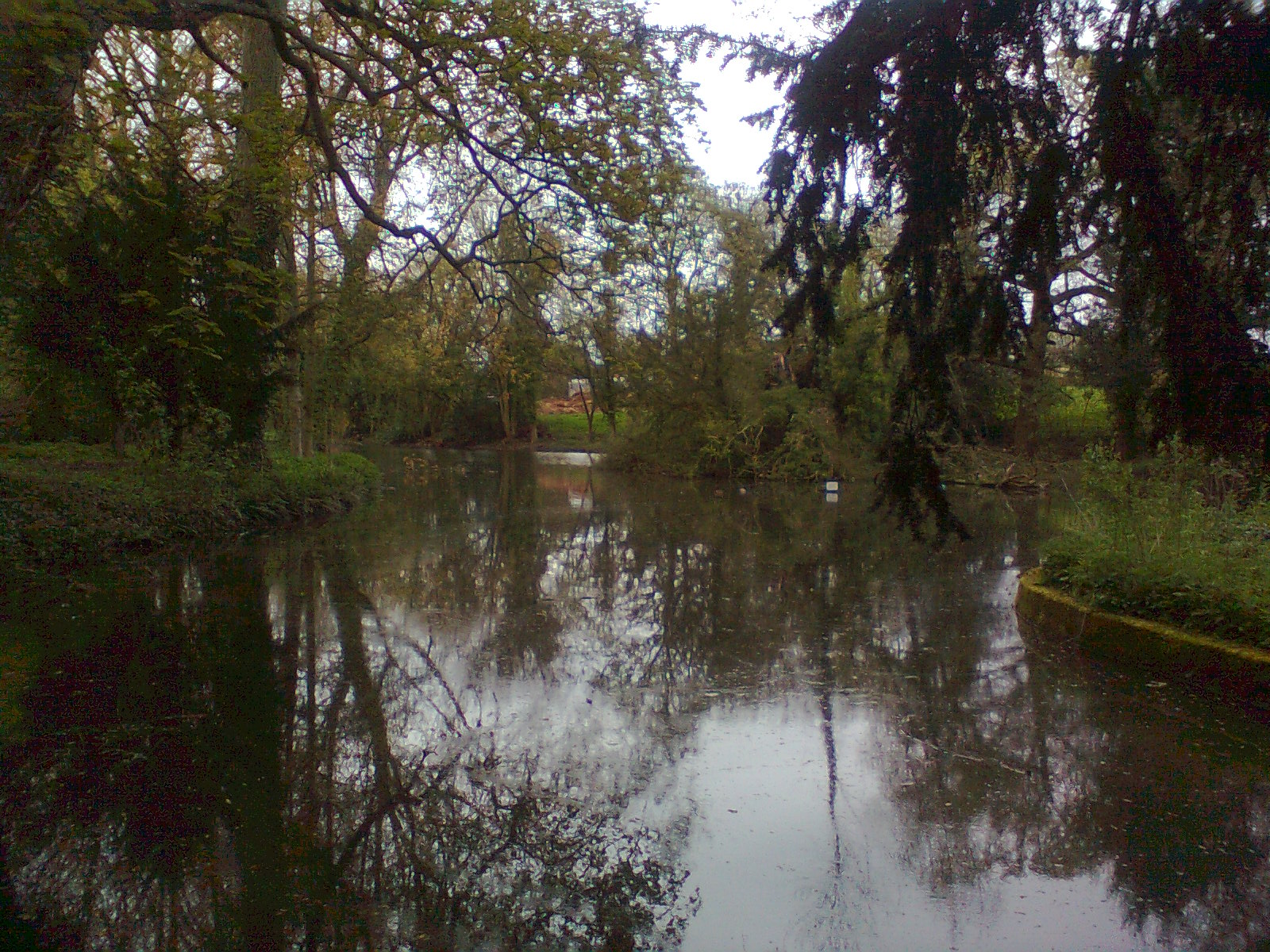
- Interactive map of Adderbury Lakes
- Type: Local Nature Reserve
- Location: Adderbury, Oxfordshire
- OS grid: SP 477 355
- Area: 1.8 hectares (4.4 acres)
- Created: July 24, 1985; 40 years ago
- Manager: Adderbury Parish Council

Adderbury Lakes is a 1.8-hectare (4.4-acre) Local Nature Reserve in Adderbury in Oxfordshire. Originally part of the grounds of Adderbury House, it is now owned and managed by Adderbury Parish Council. The reserve includes an upper and a lower lake and surrounding woodland with diverse flora and wildlife.

== Hydrology ==
The lakes are mainly fed from five natural springs immediately to the north that flow year-round. Further smaller source springs were discovered when the lakes were dredged in 2013. The lakes sit on a bed of clay and drain into Sor Brook.

== Natural history ==
Flora in the nature reserve includes aconites, bluebells, cotton thistle, charlock, creeping ivy, dead-nettle, foxglove, forget-me-not, guelder rose, herb robert, iris, meadow cranesbill, marsh violet, primrose, Queen Anne's lace, wild garlic, rosebay willowherb, violet, and wood anemone. The reserve is heavily wooded with black poplar, alder, ash, beech, hazel, maple, oak, sycamore, yew, and willow trees.

Birds living in or visiting the reserve include mallards, moorhens, kingfishers, goldcrests, long-tailed tits, nuthatches, robins, treecreepers, wrens, and woodpeckers. It is also home to pipistrelle bats, frogs, grass snakes, grey squirrels, rabbits, roe deer, moles, voles, butterflies, dragonflies, and damselflies.

== History ==
The earliest record of waterworks at Adderbury House is in an Office of Works document from 16 September 1724, and an estate plan of 1735 shows three rectangular lakes in a formal garden to the east of the house. There is an undated plan by Capability Brown showing a single long lake, probably from the period 1760–1763 when Brown was working in nearby Aynho, but there is no evidence that this was ever executed.

In 1826 Adderbury House was purchased by W. H. Chamberlin, who by 1848 had set about turning the lakes into an ornamental feature. The upper lake was lined and strengthened with stone and concrete and fitted with a sluice, and the lower lake made into a formal water garden lined with exotic plants, including some stands of bamboo that still survive. A path around the lower lake and a stone summer house were constructed at this time.

The lakes fell into neglect and disrepair from 1939 when Adderbury House was requisitioned by the War Office as sheltered accommodation during World War II, becoming overgrown and silted up with several large fallen trees blocking the flow of the water. In 1982 Adderbury Parish Council proposed converting the area into a nature reserve, which was supported by the landowners Oxfordshire County Council, and work began in 1984 carried out largely by young people from the Manpower Services Commission. 600 tons of silt and many fallen trees were removed, and bridges, paths, and fishing platforms constructed. The reserve opened on 24 July 1985.
