= Bruce Alexander (actor) =

British actor (born 1946)

- Born: Bruce John Alexander; 28 May 1946 (age 80); Watford, Hertfordshire, England
- Occupation: Actor
- Years active: 1972–present
- Known for: Superintendent Norman Mullett in A Touch of Frost (1992–2010)

Bruce John Alexander (born 28 May 1946) is a British actor. He is best known for his portrayal of Superintendent Norman Mullett in the ITV television series A Touch of Frost, in which he plays the superior of the main character Jack Frost, played by David Jason.

== Life and career ==
Alexander was born on 28 May 1946 in Watford, Hertfordshire, and has appeared with the Royal Shakespeare Company. He played Ferdinand in the 1989 production of John Webster's The Duchess of Malfi. In November 2016, he was in a "Read Not Dead" performance of Beaumont and Fletcher's The Coxcomb at the Sam Wanamaker theatre on Bankside.

In 1990, he appeared as a doctor in the first episode of the comedy Keeping Up Appearances (entitled "Daddy's Accident"), and has also featured in episodes of numerous TV series, including The Bill, Casualty, EastEnders, Midsomer Murders and Doc Martin. In 1997, Alexander had a small role in the James Bond film Tomorrow Never Dies.

In 2013, he played the character of Peter Bachman in several episodes of the TV series Love and Marriage, including "The Elephant in the Room", "Secrets & Lies", "Alarm!" and "Huge Weekend for the Paradise Family".

Alexander's radio credits include the role of Mike in Westway, the BBC World Service soap opera which ran from 1997 to 2005, and the role of Doc de Salis in the BBC dramatisation of the John le Carré novel The Honourable Schoolboy.

Alexander is the president of the Haddenham Museum in Haddenham, Buckinghamshire and is also a patron of Thame Players Theatre in Thame, Oxfordshire.

In 2019, Alexander appeared in the BBC soap opera Doctors as Ray Hopkins. In 2022, he appeared as recurring character Doug in Catherine Tate's six-part mockumentary sitcom Hard Cell, released on Netflix.

== Partial filmography ==
Film
Year	Title	Role	Notes
1980	The Long Good Friday	Mac	
1982	Giro City	GNH Lawyer	
1982	Give Us This Day	SDF man	
1990	Father	Det. Sgt Racine	
1993	Century	Interrogator	
1994	Ladybird, Ladybird	Lawyer	
1994	Nostradamus	Paul	
1997	Tomorrow Never Dies	Captain (HMS Chester)	
2000	Between Two Women	Mr. Butterworth, Headmaster	
2005	The Trial of the King Killers	John Downes	
2009	A Short Stay in Switzerland	Doctor	TV film
2011	All's Well that Ends Well		

Television
Year	Title	Role	Notes
1983	The Professionals	Detective	1 episode: The Ojuka Situation
1992–2010	A Touch of Frost	Superintendent Norman Mullett	42 episodes
1997	Woof!	Mr. Dobkin	1 episode: Testing Times.
2006	Heartbeat	Mr. Stevens	1 episode: Keeping Secrets.
2019–2022	Gentleman Jack	Mr. Parker	9 episodes
2022	Hard Cell	Doug	
