= The Slade, Oxfordshire =

Local nature reserve in Oxfordshire, England

Coordinates: 52.0165°N 1.386°W

The Slade
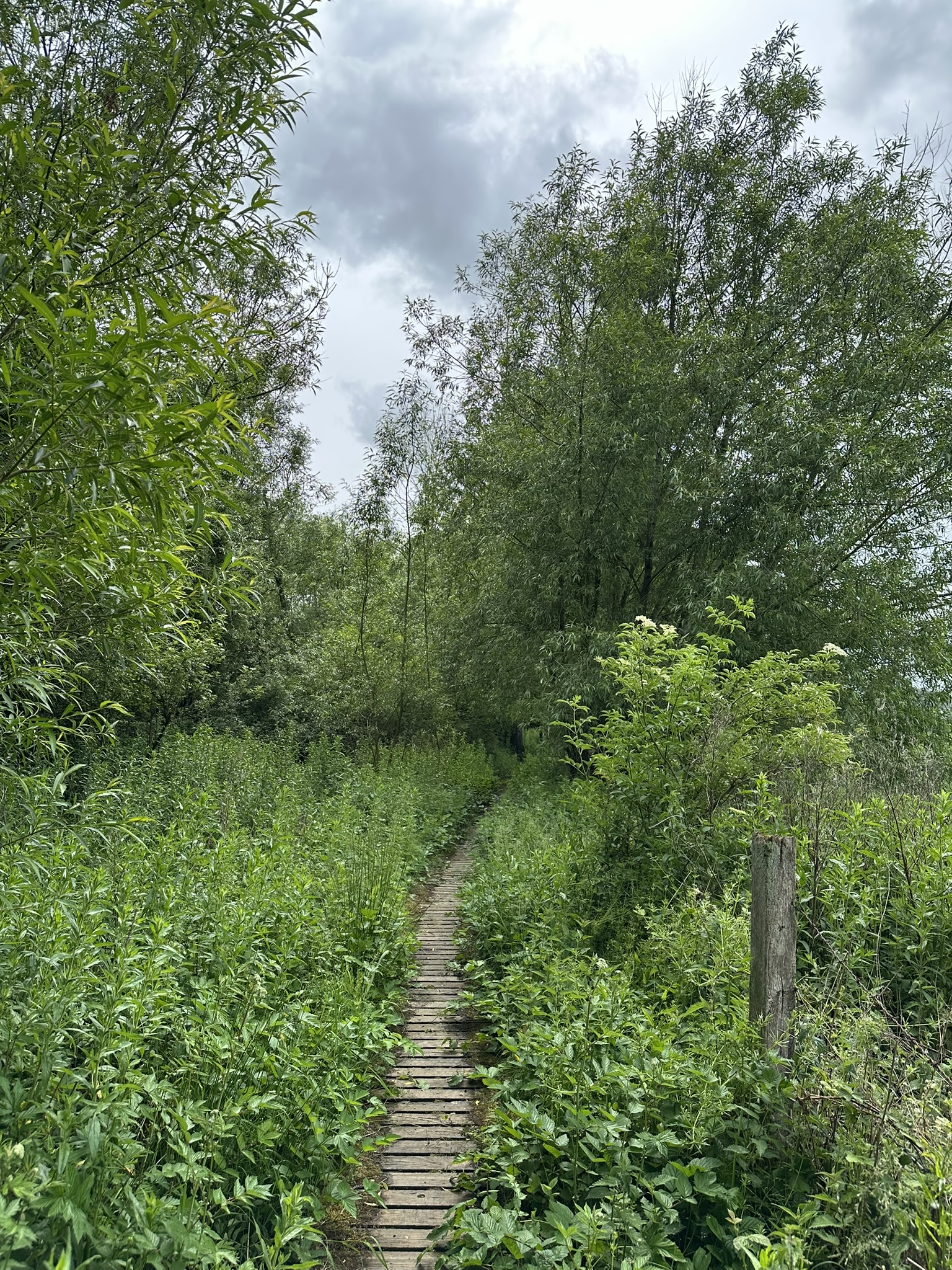
- Boardwalk along the northern edge of The Slade
- Interactive map of The Slade
- Type: Local Nature Reserve
- Location: near Bloxham, Oxfordshire
- OS grid: SP 421 354
- Area: 2.1 hectares (5.2 acres)
- Created: March 26, 2018; 8 years ago
- Manager: Bloxham Parish Council

The Slade is a 2.1-hectare (5.2-acre) Local Nature Reserve on the southwestern edge of Bloxham in Oxfordshire.

== Description ==
The site is small but varied, with areas of wet meadow, alder woodland, and a relatively dry disused railway embankment. A small stream joins Bloxham Brook (itself a tributary of the Sor Brook) within the reserve, and there are two ponds formed by disused quarry pits.

== Natural history ==
More than 170 plant species have been recorded in the reserve. The wet meadow has hard rush, meadowsweet, sedges and common spotted orchids. In the alder woodland, other wet-loving plants grow including great willowherb, marsh-marigold and wild angelica.

The reserve is home to a variety of butterflies and birds, and is frequented by common pipistrelle, soprano pipistrelle, noctule, brown long-eared and mouse-eared bats. Badgers, hares, and grass snakes have also been recorded at the site.

== History ==
The Slade was officially declared a Local Nature Reserve on 26 March 2018, although it had already been an undesignated nature reserve for many years before that point.

The reserve features a small mound, the ruins of a pest house from the early 19th century, serving nearby Bloxham. It was surrounded by a moat and had a special stone where food could be left for the infected without putting the villagers at risk.

== Gallery ==
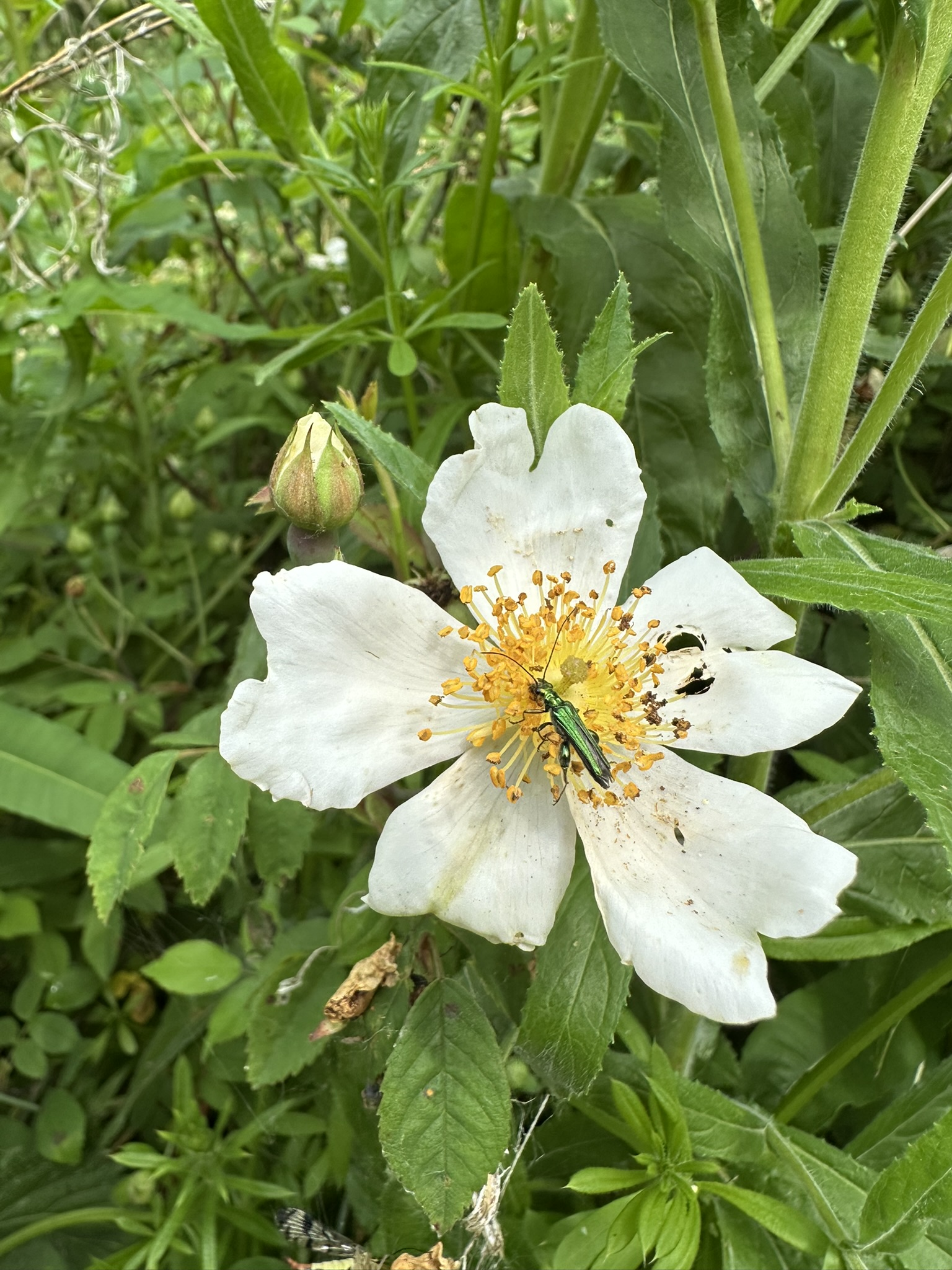
False oil beetle feeding on dog rose pollen

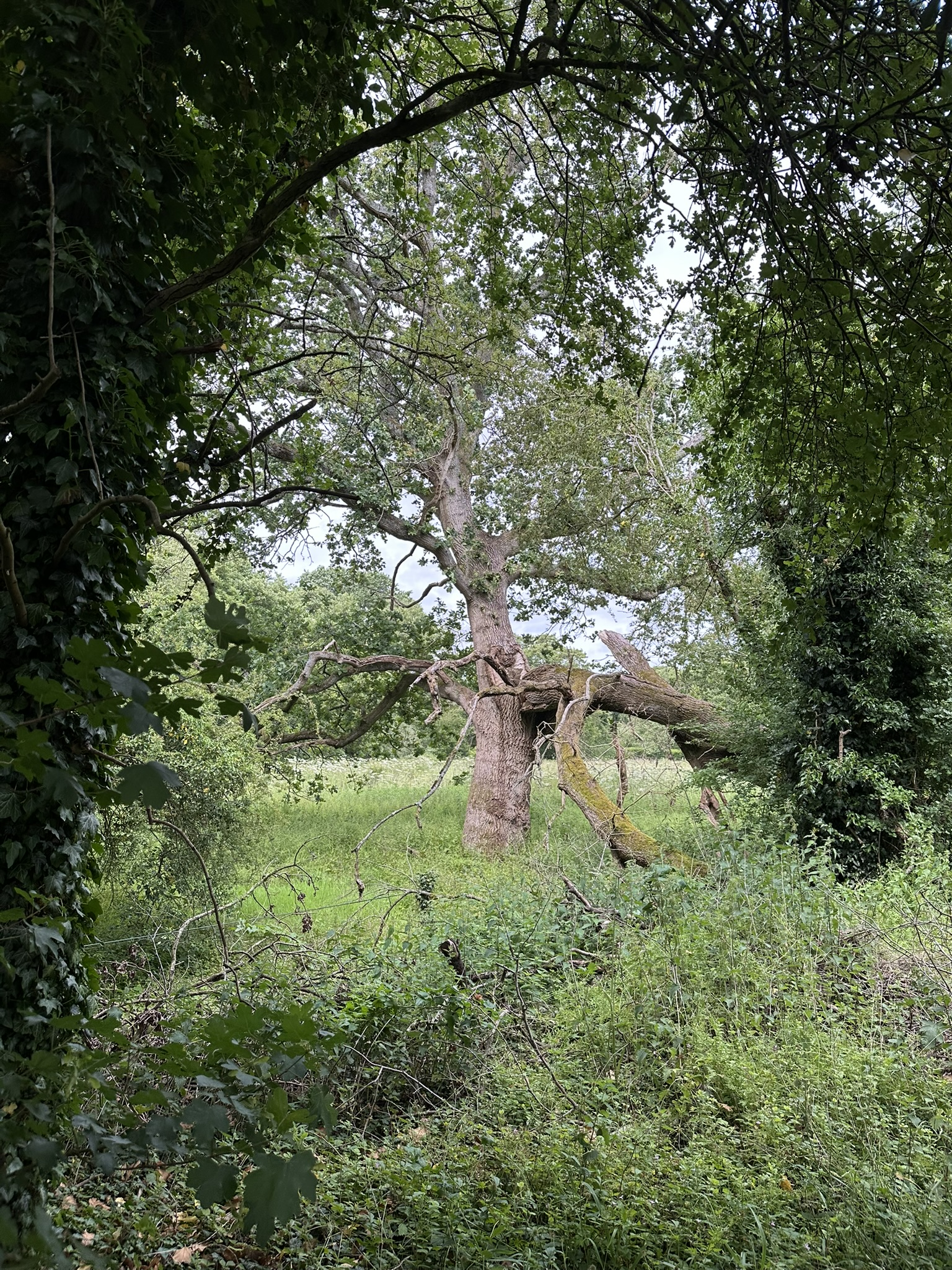
Wet meadow

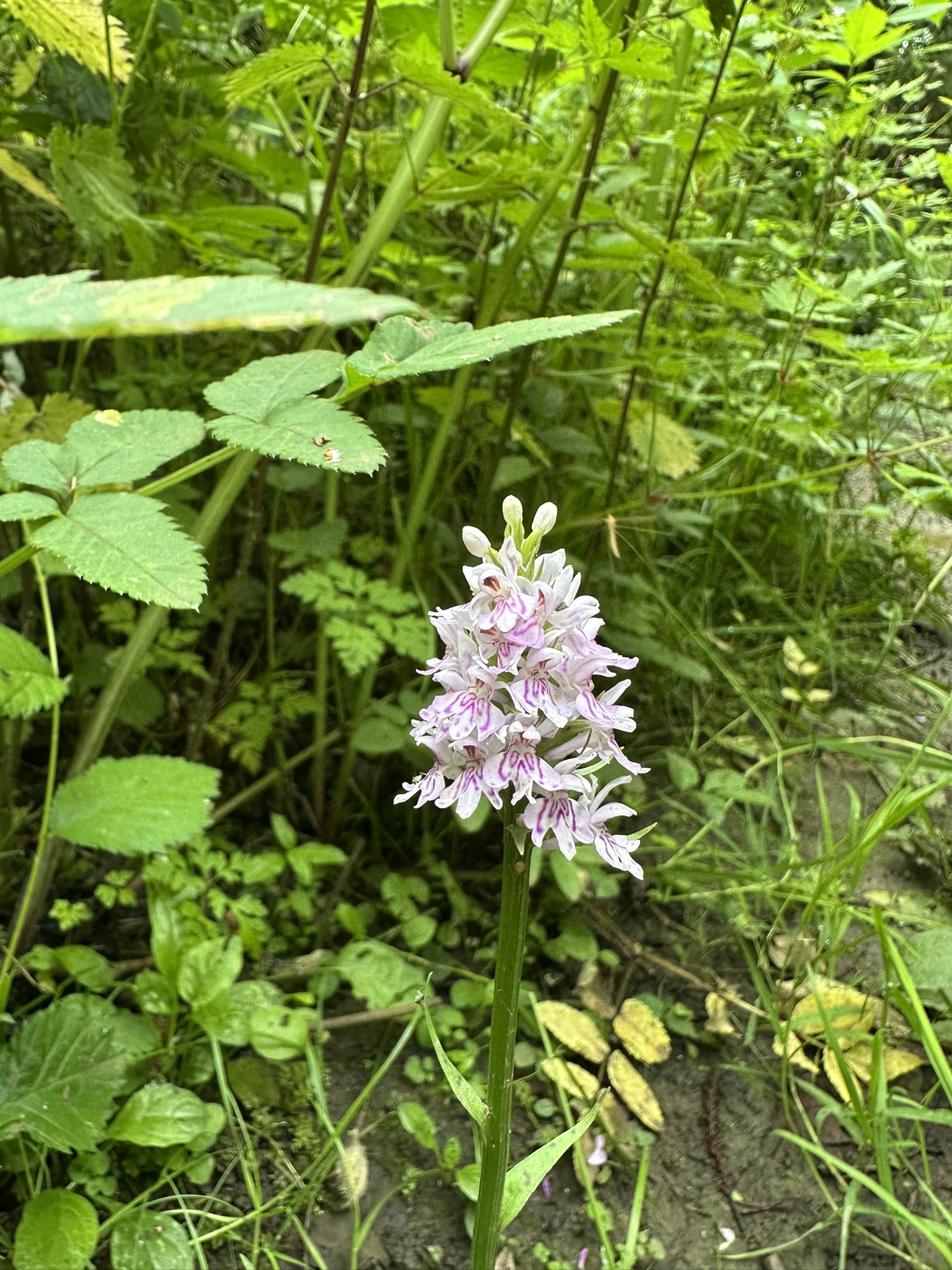
Common spotted orchid
