= St Mary's Church, Adderbury =

Medieval church in England

- The Church of St Mary the Virgin, Adderbury
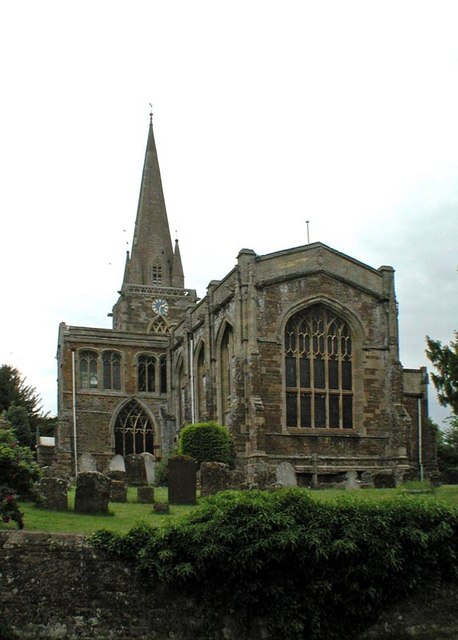
- St Mary's Church, Adderbury
- OS grid reference: SP 47089 35378
- Country: England
- Denomination: Church of England
- Previous denomination: Roman Catholic

History
- Dedication: St Mary the Virgin

Architecture
- Heritage designation: Grade I listed
- Style: Gothic

Administration
- Archdiocese: Canterbury
- Diocese: Oxford
- Deanery: Deddington
- Parish: Adderbury

Clergy
- Vicar: Rev. Liz Simpson

The Parish Church of Saint Mary the Virgin, Adderbury (also referred to as St Mary's Church) is a Church of England parish church in the village of Adderbury, Oxfordshire, England. It is a Grade I listed building.

== History ==
The church was likely founded before the Norman Conquest, as the village was named after the 10th century St Eadburga, and the bishops of Winchester claimed in the 13th century that the village had been granted to them by Athelstan in 1014-15, though this cannot have happened as Athelstan was dead by then.

In the Middle Ages, Adderbury served as the mother church to a wide area, including Milton, Bodicote and Barford St John, and was consequently rebuilt on a grand scale to be one of the largest churches in Oxfordshire. Its wealthy benefice caused a long-running dispute between the bishops, the crown and the papacy until in 1381 Bishop William of Wykeham settled the matter by granting it to New College, Oxford.

The church was damaged in the English Civil War of the 1640s, when much of its medieval stained glass was destroyed. Thereafter, the laxity of college ownership appears to have encouraged a rise in nonconformity, while the church fell into decay. One of the few developments of this period was the installation of a new clock in 1684, replacing one of 1611.

After the church reached a nadir in the 1820s, when the curate went mad, a revival began under a new incumbent. This saw the growth of the congregation, the establishment of a lending library, and the first restoration of the building in 1831 by J.C. Buckler.

== Architecture ==
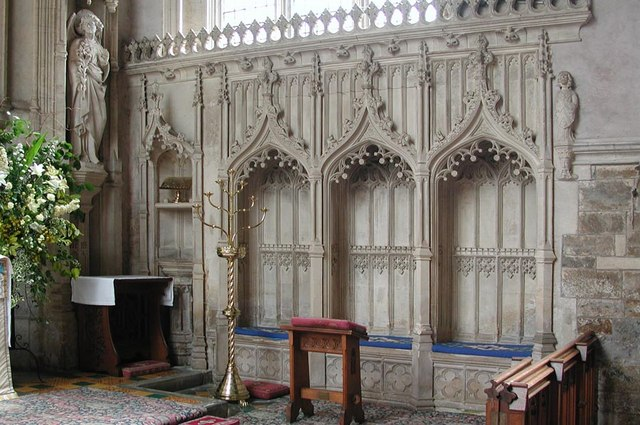
The chancel piscina and sedilia

The church is a medieval cruciform stone building with a west tower and spire. The earliest parts are the 13th century transepts, with Geometrical traceried windows. The nave arcades are of a similar date, though altered later. Reconstruction of the nave and the addition of the tower followed in the early 14th century. These parts are all ornamented with 317 carvings in the Decorated Gothic style, with animals on the south aisle and musicians on the north. The tower also has gargoyles at the top of each of its diagonal corner buttresses. In 1408-18, New College added a grand chancel and vestry, designed by Richard Winchcombe, who also designed the Divinity School at Oxford, as well as other works for New College. Unusually, the building records survive, showing that the work cost £399 5s 4d. The works included a very fine sedilia, piscina and reredos, which survive, albeit restored. However, the tracery of the windows was replaced in Buckler's restoration. The 148-foot-tall stone spire, though often dated to the 14th century, was also probably an addition of the 15th century, as can be seen from the angular mouldings at the edges.

== Fittings ==
The rood screen survives from the 15th century, and there is also 17th century panelling and an 18th century communion table, but the remainder of the furnishings, including the font, misericords and organ, are 19th century. The screen was restored by George Gilbert Scott and given a new loft.

The stained glass is all 19th century, and includes windows by Willement (1834), Ward and Hughes, Clayton and Bell, and Powell and Sons.

Within the church there are a brass commemorating Jane Smith (d.1508) and a painted memorial to Thomas More (d.1586, and not to be confused with the earlier philosopher).

== Gallery ==
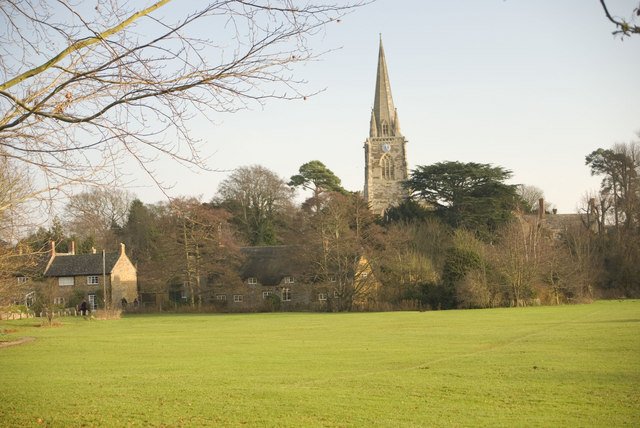
The tower and spire.

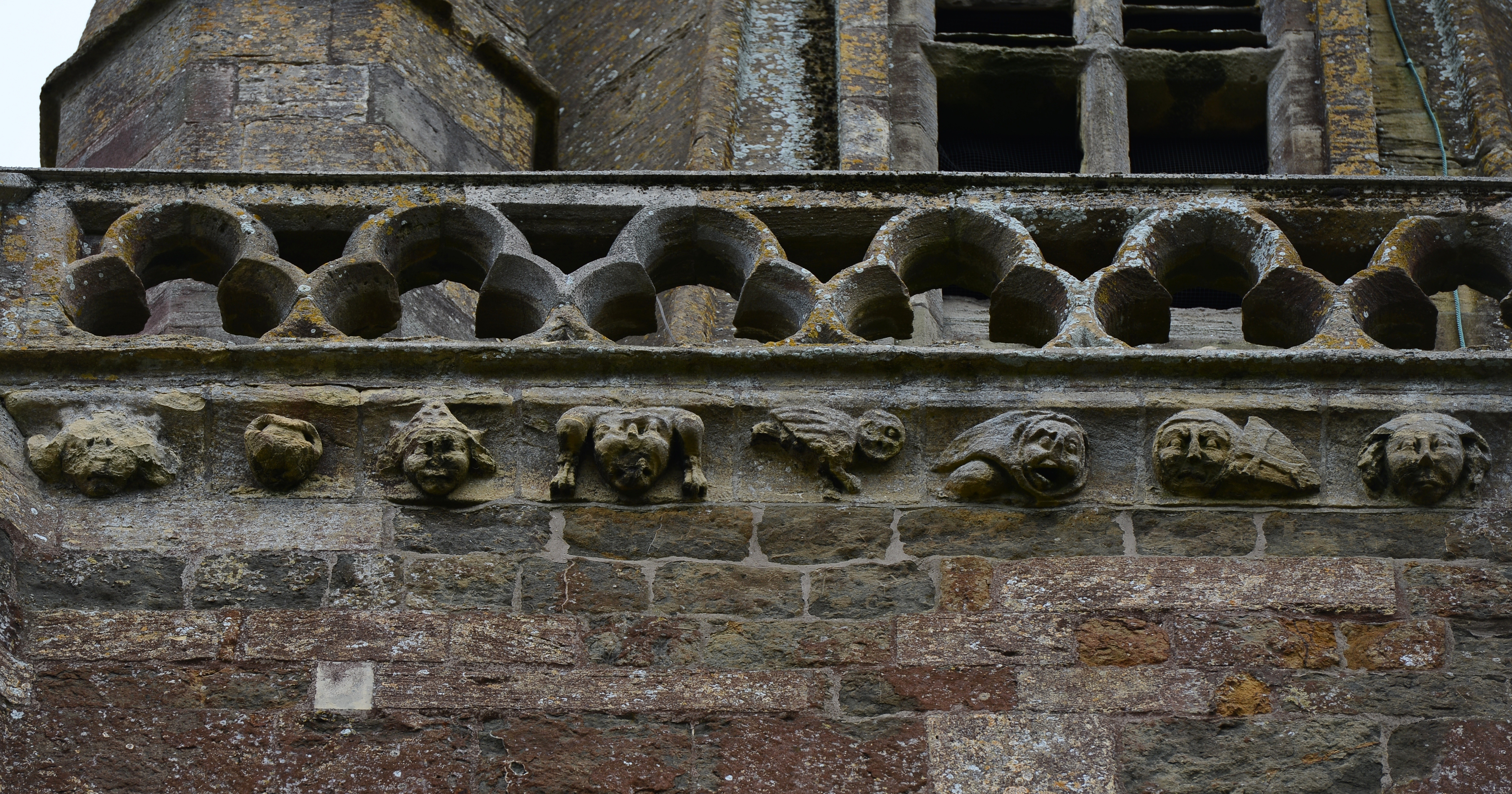
Carved frieze on the tower

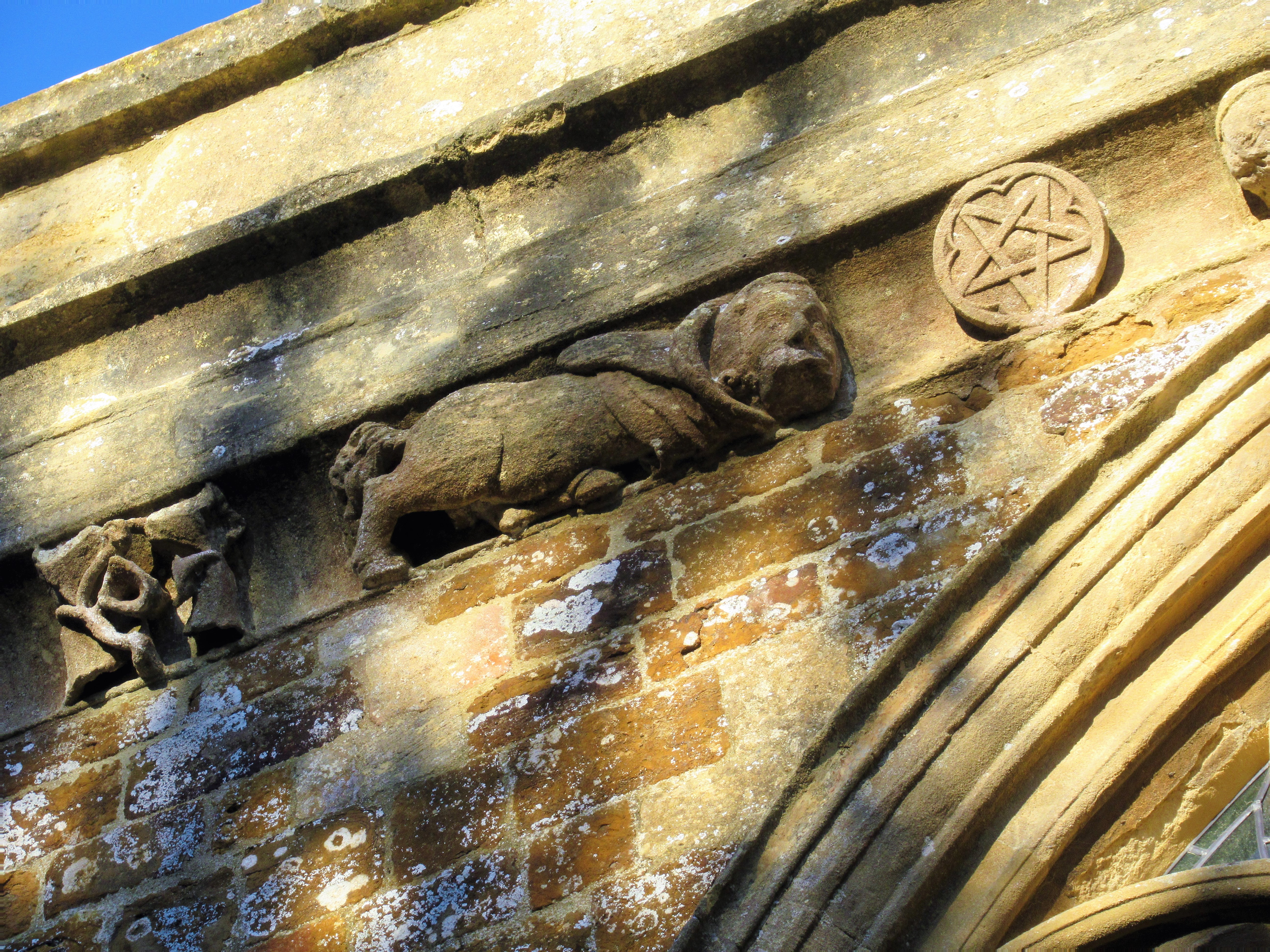
Southern frieze

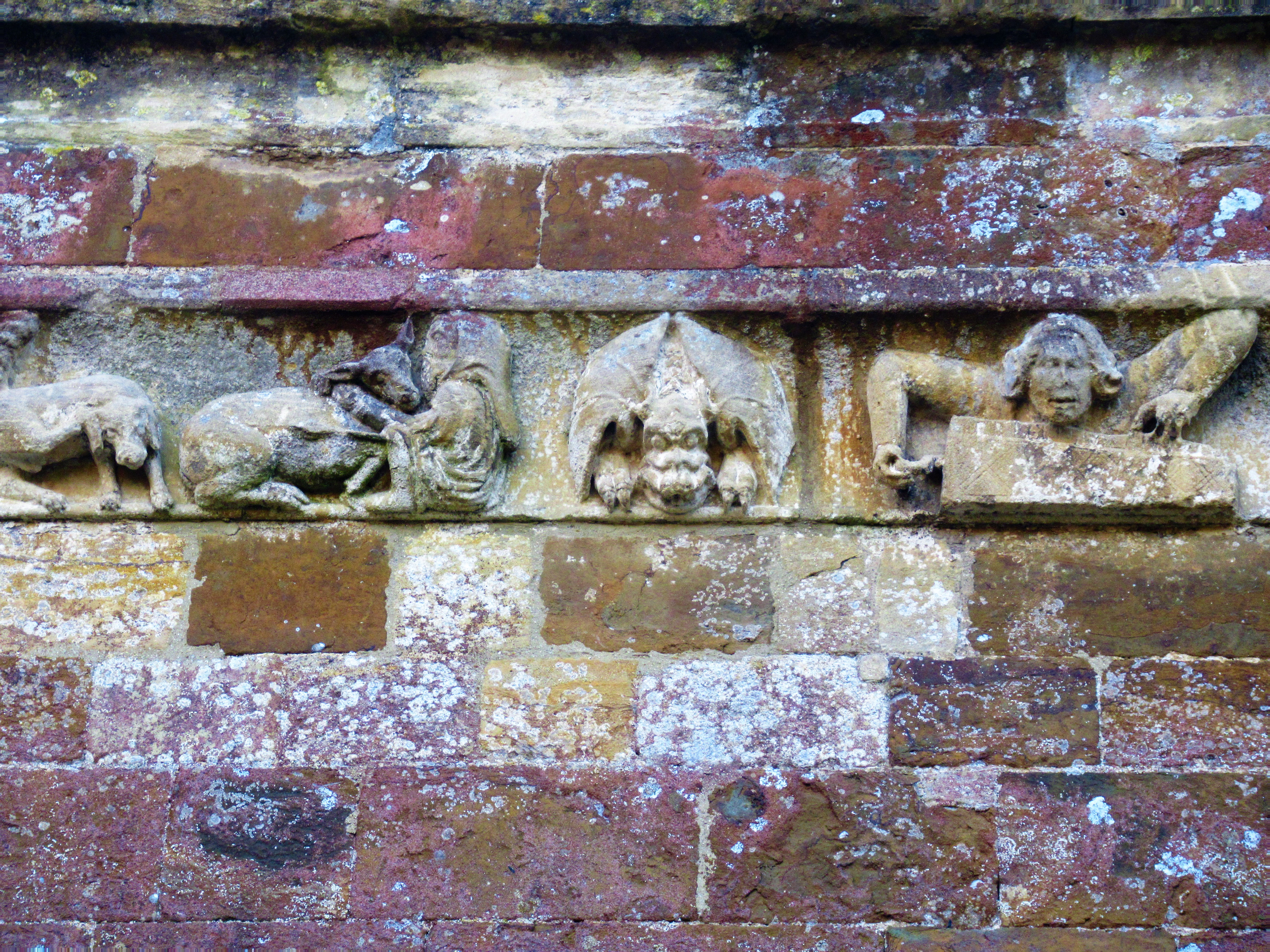
Northern frieze

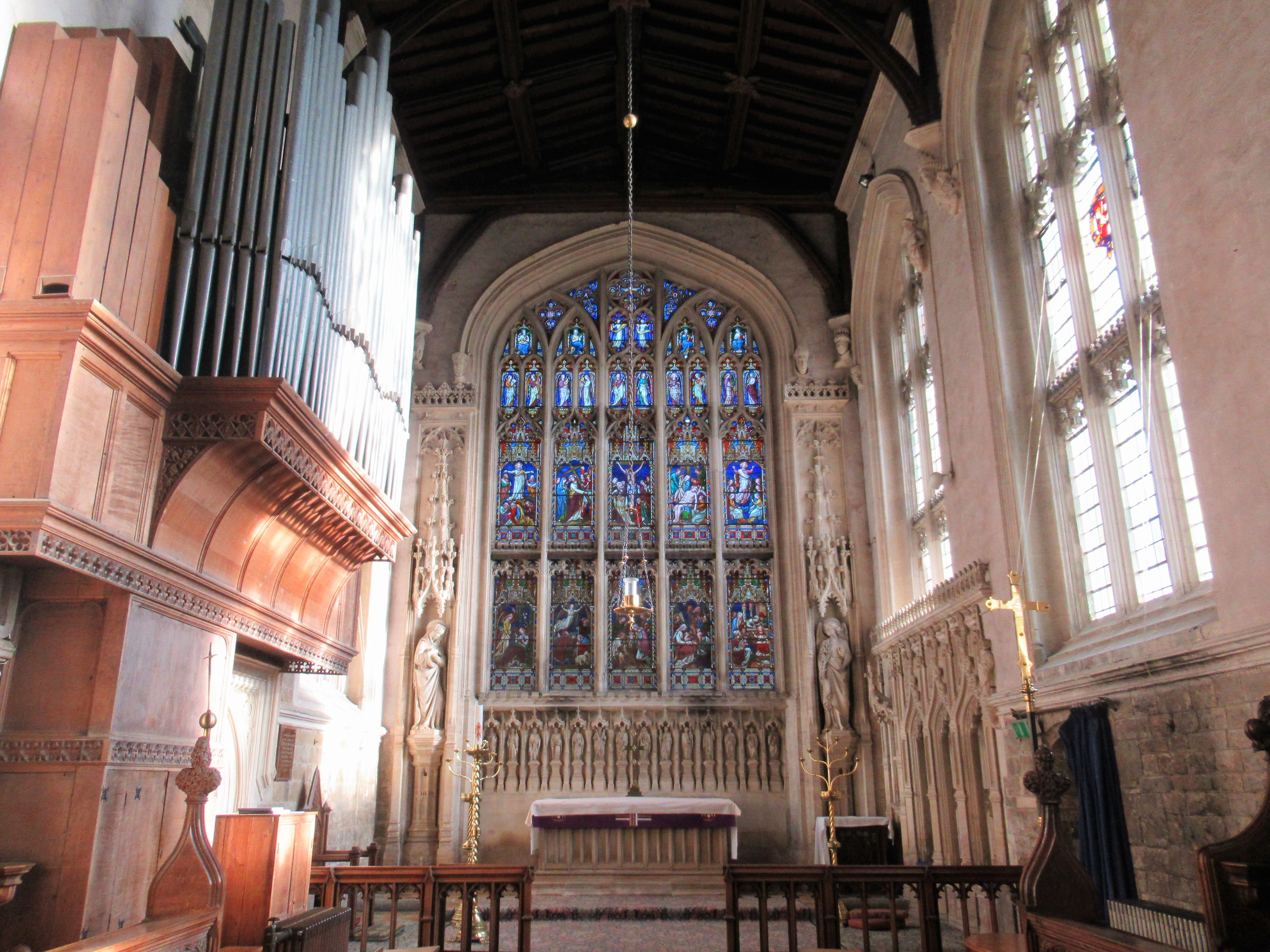
Chancel interior

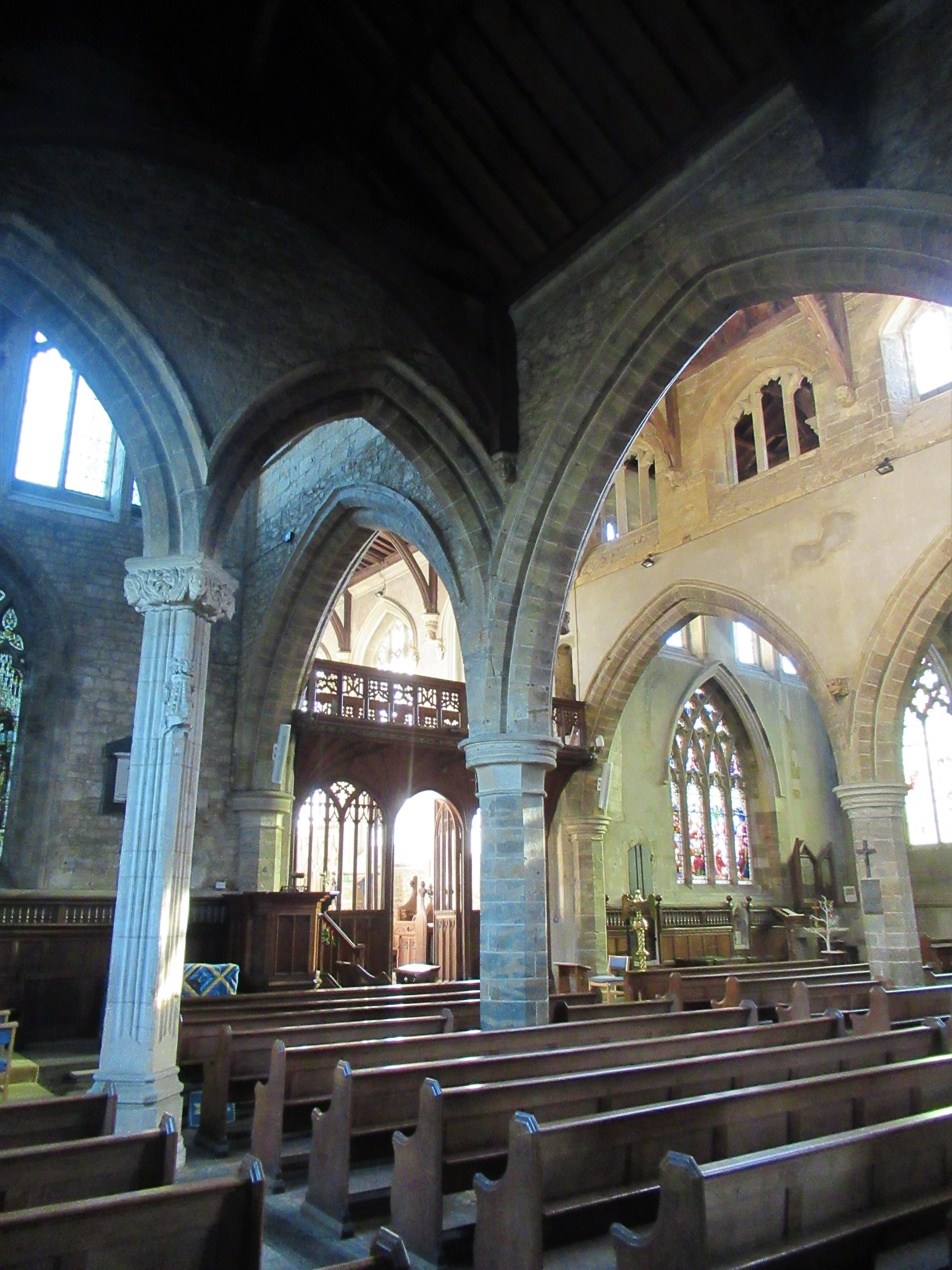
Nave interior and rood screen

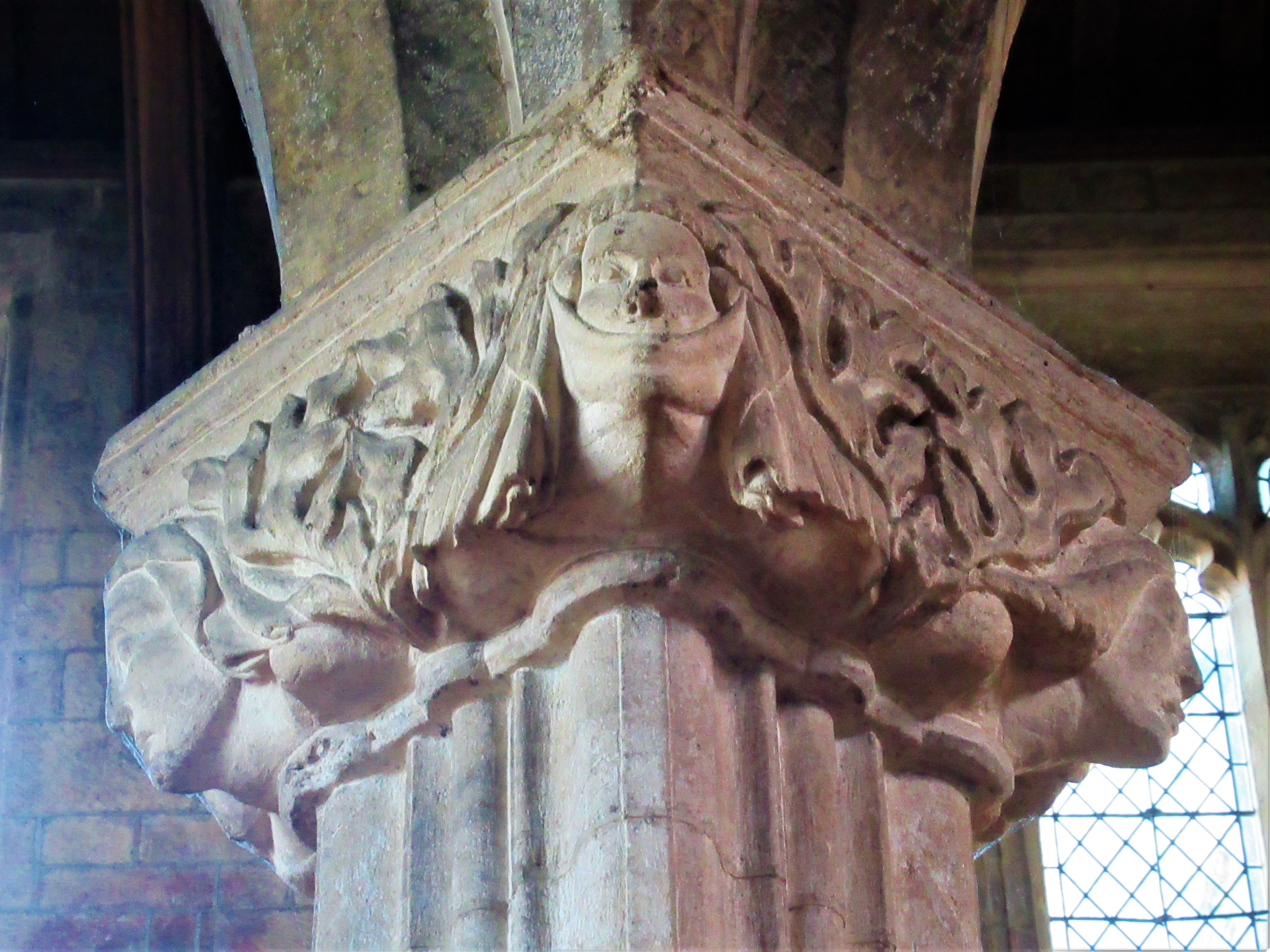
Capital carving of a lady in the north transept

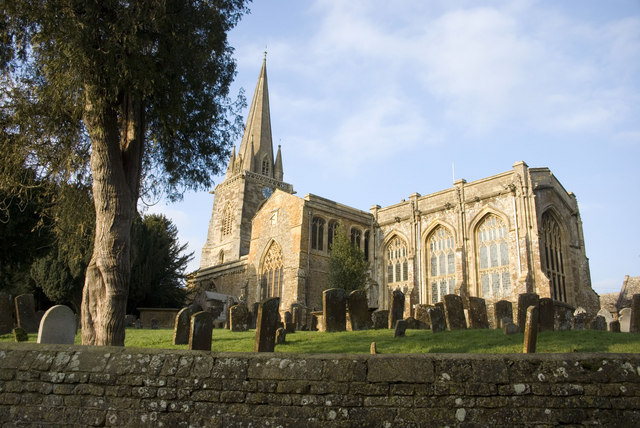
Exterior from SE
