= Haddenham War Memorial =

War Memorial located in Church End, Haddenham, Buckinghamshire, England

Coordinates: 51.766346°N 0.927243°W

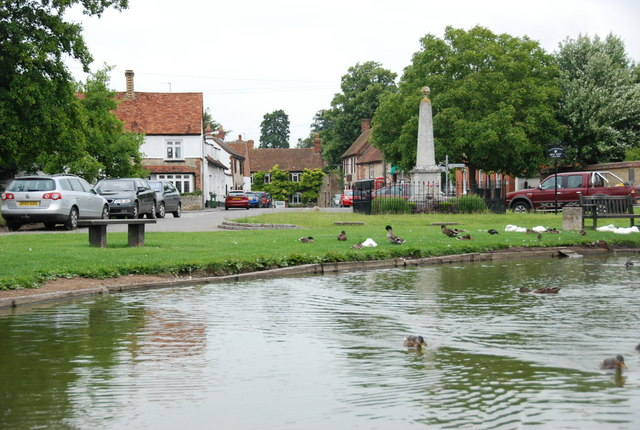
Haddenham war memorial and village pond

Haddenham War Memorial is located in Church End, Haddenham, Buckinghamshire, England. It is a grade II listed building with Historic England. It was built in the summer of 1921 and unveiled by the Marquis of Lincolnshire on 16 October 1921. The memorial is built from Portland stone and stands 14 feet high. The apex of the obelisk is surmounted by a ball finial carved with acanthus (plant) leaves, between which are the thistle, shamrock and rose. The base has corner pilasters, framing the inscribed panels. On the North face of the obelisk is carved a laurel wreath, with the words ‘OUR GLORIOUS DEAD’ and ‘THEIR NAME LIVETH FOR EVERMORE’. On the plinth are the words: ‘IN/ HONOUR/ AND/ UNDYING MEMORY/ OF/ THE MEN OF THIS VILLAGE/ WHO/ GAVE THEIR LIVES/ IN THE GREAT WAR/ OF/ 1914- 1918/ AND/ 1939 -1945’. The names are then recorded, with the regiments to which the men belonged.
