= Haddenham Museum =

Coordinates: 51°46′19″N 0°55′44″W

- Established: November 1998
- Location: The Old Schoolroom, Haddenham, Buckinghamshire, England
- Type: Private, Local History and Rural Life Museum

Haddenham Museum is based in Haddenham, Buckinghamshire, England. The museum, which is run by volunteers, first opened in 1998, and is housed in the Old Schoolroom of the Methodist chapel in the centre of the village. The museum was established to collect and preserve historical information and artefacts about the village and its collection includes both household and industrial items as well as farming implements, photographs and documents relating to the domestic and rural life of the village of Haddenham.

== Opening Times and Directions ==
The museum is normally open from March to December, on Tuesday mornings from 10 to 12am and Sunday afternoons from 2 to 4-30pm and is located behind the Methodist Chapel in the High Street, nearest postcode is HP17 8ES. For 2020 opening times have been reduced to Sundays only, from 2 until 4pm.

== History ==
The idea for a museum resulted from an exhibition held in November 1988. The enthusiasm shown by local people who loaned historic items for, or attended, the exhibition indicated that a museum would be a popular venture. Following an inaugural public meeting in June 1998 and having secured a lease with the Methodist Church, the museum opened in the chapel's Old Schoolroom on 1 November 1998. On 1 November 2008 the museum celebrated its 10th anniversary which included a display of vintage vehicles and costumed members of the Haddenham Players adding an historic falour to the event.

== Collection and activities ==
The museum's focus is on domestic, industrial and rural life. To further its aims the museum collects information, photographs and artefacts‘the buildings and lands, the inhabitants and their livelihoods, the tools of their trades, stories and events that make up the history of the village’. The museum arranges special exhibitions every few months and supports schools and community groups by giving talks and tours. Also, the Museum publishes a yearly book, part of a series called the Haddenham Chronicles, written by locals from in or around the village. Member of the Museum receive a monthly newsletter, containing news about the Museum and interesting columns.

== Management and funding ==
The museum, which is a registered charity, is overseen by a board of ten trustees. The President of the museum, who officially opened it, is the actor Bruce Alexander. There is a committee and stewards with responsibility for looking after the museum's collection and its activities. Everyone involved are volunteers. The Trust's aim is that the museum should become a centre of information for the benefit of the whole community. The museum is funded through fund-raising events and by public subscription. Membership is £5pa adults and £1pa for children. The museum is currently open on Tuesday mornings and Sunday afternoon.
