= Peter Aldington =

British architect (1933–2026)

- Born: Peter John Aldington; 14 April 1933; Preston, Lancashire, England
- Died: 15 April 2026 (aged 93)
- Education: Manchester School of Architecture
- Occupation: Architect
- Spouse: Margaret Aldington
- Parent(s): Dr John Aldington; Edna (née Entwisle)
- Awards: OBE (1986); RIBA Award for Architecture (1970)
- Practice: Aldington, Craig and Collinge
- Buildings: Turn End; Anderton House
- Website: www.turnend.org.uk

Peter John Aldington (14 April 1933 – 15 April 2026) was a British architect associated with post-war British domestic architecture. His work Turn End in Haddenham, Buckinghamshire, is among his best-known projects and is recognised through heritage listing. He received a Royal Institute of British Architects Award for Architecture in 1970 and was appointed OBE in the 1986 New Year Honours for services to architecture.

== Early life ==
Peter Aldington was born in Preston, Lancashire, to John and Edna Aldington. His father was a businessman who became managing director of Siemens Brothers. It was a staunchly Baptist household and Aldington later credited the parents' religion and love of gardening as influencing his puritan approach to architecture. John Aldington was a friend of the architect Sir George Grenfell-Baines, who lived in Preston and who designed the family house and gardens, Grenfell-Baines influenced Peter Aldington's decision to study architecture at Manchester School of Architecture a constituent school of Manchester's two universities, where Norman Foster was a contemporary. He completed his National Service in the RAF.

== Career ==
After graduation Aldington joined the architects department of London County Council (LCC), which in the post war reconstruction era had a large operational portfolio. He was still working for the LCC when he started his first independent project, a house in Askett Green. Aldington established his architectural practice in the 1960s and later worked with John Craig, who was an artist with a background in advertising. In 1980 Paul Collinge joined, to create the partnership Aldington, Craig and Collinge.

Between 1964 and 1968, he and his wife Margaret designed and built Turn End, comprising three houses—The Turn, Middle Turn and Turn End—and a garden, noted for its relationship between house and landscape in a village setting. Turn End received a RIBA Award for Architecture in 1970. The houses were listed at Grade II in 1998 and upgraded to Grade II* in 2006; the garden is listed at Grade II on the Register of Parks and Gardens.

Aldington's practice produced several residential projects that have been discussed in architectural histories of the post-war period. Aldington retired from architectural practice in 1986 at the age of 53, subsequently focusing on garden design.

== Architectural approach ==
Commentators have noted his attention to context, materials and the integration of buildings with their settings within the tradition of post-war domestic architecture in Britain. The practice distinguished itself through meticulous client briefing processes and their ability to articulate client needs "with great creativity through their understanding of the craft of building and use of materials and particular attention to setting". Aldington's approach involved extensive briefing periods with clients, sometimes lasting six to nine months, allowing designs to emerge quickly once the brief was fully understood.

In the case of his first independent work, Askett Green, Aldington and his wife lived in the house for two years and directly helped to build the property, while it was being constructed. Aldington's extensive use of timber in the building is a reflection of the career of Michael White, a timber specialist and entomologist with the Building Research Station, for whom the house was commissioned. The Aldingtons handed the house over when Mr. and Mrs. White returned from working in Nigeria, in 1964. The project cost the Whites £5,106, the equivalent in 2025 of approximately £100,000.

== Critical reception and influence ==
Aldington's work has been positioned among the finest examples of 1960s domestic architecture in Britain. Turn End has been mentioned among "the best" 1960s one-off houses, placing it alongside notable works by Team 4, Richard Rogers, Basil Spence, and Stout & Litchfield. The project has been characterised as an exemplar of architecture "without showing off", noted for its modesty, matter-of-fact construction, and spatial planning that creates "timeless, rooted in place and culture" architecture.

Critics have emphasised Aldington's synthesis of English traditions with modernist principles. His work reflects "English traditions of the picturesque and vernacular design and construction while fusing with modernist ideas to make an architecture of its place". Eleanor Young, editor of RIBA Journal has noted his development of "modernist rural vernacular" and his philosophy that "an architect shouldn't come along with hard earned middle class money and plonk a posh house in the middle of a village, but should build a bit of village". He has been cited in Concrete Quarterly as "one of the great romantic modernists of the 1960s and 70s".

Aldington's legacy has been recognised through the influence it has had on subsequent architects working in residential design. Contemporary practices have acknowledged the influence of Aldington's body of work, with The Twentieth Century Society noting that he has "more listed buildings than any other architect in the UK" and that "every house he completed has now been listed". This achievement is considered "particularly impressive given that architects based in rural areas tend to operate under the radar of the architectural press".

The National Life Stories project recorded an interview with Aldington, held by the British Library, under their Architects' Lives series, along with similar interviews with Lord Foster and Sir George Grenfell-Baines.

== Death ==
Aldington died on 15 April 2026, at the age of 93.

== Selected works ==
Name	Year	Location	Listing status
Askett Green	1961–1962	Crowbrook Road, Princes Risborough	Grade II
Turn End (The Turn, Middle Turn and Turn End)	1964–1967	Haddenham, Buckinghamshire	Grade II* (houses); Garden listed on the Register of Parks and Gardens of Special Historic Interest
Clayton House (also known as Quilter House)	1965–1966	Prestwood, Buckinghamshire	Grade II
Diggs Field	1967–1969	Haddenham, Buckinghamshire	Grade II
3A Ellers Road	1967-1968	Bessacar, Doncaster	Grade II
17B Princess Place	1969-1970	Notting Hill, London	Grade II
Anderton House	1970–1972	Goodleigh, near Barnstaple, Devon	Grade II*
Lyde End	1975–1977	Bledlow, Buckinghamshire	Grade II
Wedgwood House	1975–1978	Higham St Mary, Suffolk	Grade II

== Awards and honours ==
- Royal Institute of British Architects Award for Architecture (1970)
- Officer of the Order of the British Empire (1986)
