= Peter Parrott (RAF officer) =

RAF pilot from World War II

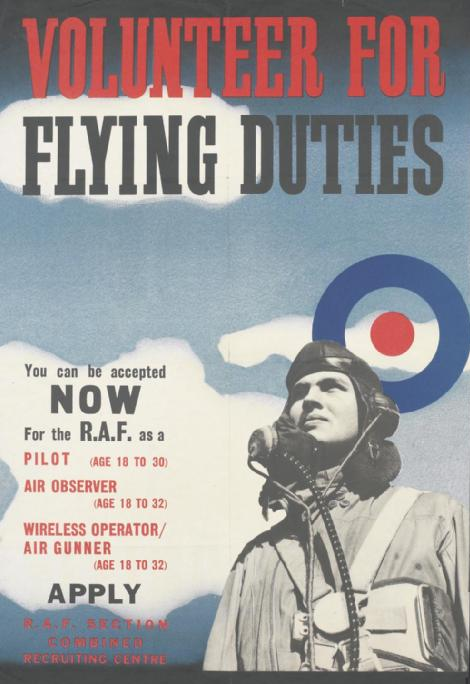
- Volunteer for flying duties art (Peter Parrott)
- Born: 28 June 1920; Haddenham, Buckinghamshire, England
- Died: 27 August 2003 (aged 83)
- Military career
- Allegiance: United Kingdom
- Branch: Royal Air Force
- Service years: 1938–1965
- Rank: Wing commander
- Nickname: Polly
- Service number: 41054
- Commands: No. 43 Squadron RAF; No. 111 Squadron RAF
- Conflicts: Second World War: Battle of France; Battle of Britain
- Awards: Distinguished Flying Cross & Bar; Air Force Cross

Peter Lawrence Parrott, DFC & Bar, AFC (28 June 1920 – 27 August 2003) was a British aviator, flying ace, and an officer in the Royal Air Force (RAF). He flew fighter aircraft during the Battle of France and the Battle of Britain during the Second World War and later became a test pilot, retiring from the RAF in 1965. Awarded the Distinguished Flying Cross and Air Force Cross, Parrott is best known as being the face of a recruitment campaign to encourage people to join the RAF. When his medals were sold in 2022, the auction house noted that "...he did more in 1940, aged just 19, than most people experience in a lifetime."

== Early life ==
Peter Lawrence Parrott was born in Haddenham, Buckinghamshire, on 28 June 1920. He finished his education at Lord Williams's Grammar School in Thame, Oxfordshire. Though many of his family were solicitors, after leaving school he worked for Buckinghamshire County Council.

== Career ==
Parrott joined the Royal Air Force (RAF) on a short-service commission in 1938, and was sent to No. 1 Elementary and Reserve Flying Training School at Hatfield, then on to No. 11 Elementary Flying School at RAF Shawbury. After that, he was posted to RAF Catfoss in 1939, towing targets for the armament training school. In January 1940, he was sent to join No. 607 Squadron RAF in France, initially flying Gloster Gladiators, but later converted to Hawker Hurricanes in April 1940, with Parrott being the only experienced pilot on the Hurricane in his squadron.

The famous picture of Parrott on the recruiting poster was taken while he was stationed in northern France, partaking in the Battle of France. He was giving a display for war correspondents when an RAF photographer asked him to turn around and look at the roof of the Nissen hut he had just left. "I couldn't see anything of interest there, but as I did so, he dropped to one knee, took a photograph and said 'thank you'." Parrott later stated that when he arrived back in England, the poster was everywhere. After many sorties over northern France against a variety of German aircraft, he received news in early May 1940 that his brother, a Whitley pilot, was listed as missing. Parrott was allowed home on leave on 17 May 1940, and while there, he received a telegram telling him to report to No. 145 Squadron RAF at RAF Tangmere. While flying with No. 145 Squadron, Parrott was shot down, crash landing in a field near to the town of Deal in Kent. He was picked up by staff from RAF Manston.

In August 1940, Parrott shot down a Junkers Ju 87 Stuka bomber that had been attacking convoys off the coast of England. The Stuka, of Sturzkampfgeschwader 77, crash landed on the Isle of Wight. He also shot down an ME 109 and a JU 88, before being posted to No. 605 Squadron RAF in October 1940. It was whilst he was here that he received notification of his Distinguished Flying Cross on account of him being on operational defence since January 1940. It was noted in his citation in the London Gazette that he was responsible for the shooting down of at least six aircraft.

In April 1941, Parrott was posted to the Central Flying School, then RAF Hullavington and RAF Tern Hill, all on instructional duties. After this, he had a brief spell with No. 57 Operational Training Unit, and then a posting to No. 501 Squadron RAF at Martlesham Heath. Not long after arriving at No. 501 Squadron, Parrott was posted to No. 72 Squadron RAF in Malta.

In 1943, Parrott was posted to No. 43 Squadron RAF, which was operating from Capodichino, near Naples in Italy, and he was promoted to squadron leader a few days after his arrival. He briefly commanded No. 111 Squadron RAF, before returning to No. 43 Squadron, of which Parrott became the commanding officer in November 1943, retaining command until March 1944.

Following the end of the Second World War, Parrott was a test pilot for the RAF and was awarded an Air Force Cross in 1952. He retired from the RAF in 1965 as a wing commander. After leaving the RAF, Parrott held a number of jobs, one of which was flying for the Libyan authorities. In 1973, Muammar Gaddafi instructed Parrott to fly to Uganda and pick-up Idi Amin, who was to be a mediator in the Arab-Israeli War. On arrival at Entebbe Airport, Parrott and his colleagues were detained and interrogated, as the Ugandan authorities thought they were mercenaries.

== Personal life ==
Parrott married Mary Dunning in 1948, who during the war was in the Women's Auxiliary Air Force and had been posted to the Y station at RAF Chicksands. Parrott and Dunning had two children. He died on 27 August 2003. In January 2022, Parrott's medals were sold in an auction alongside those of his brother, Flying Officer Thomas Hayward Parrott, who was killed in 1940. The collection sold for £200,000, and the auction house handling the sale of the medals described as Parrott as someone who "...did more in 1940, aged just 19, than most people experience in a lifetime."
