= Haddenham-Thame Greenway =

Proposed walking, wheeling and cycling route in England

Coordinates: 51°45′41″N 00°57′22″W

The Haddenham-Thame Greenway is a planned off-road, all-weather route that will connect Haddenham, in Buckinghamshire, and Thame, in Oxfordshire, England. It is intended for walkers, cyclists and those using other wheeled non-road transport, such as wheelchairs, mobility scooters, prams and children's scooters. The greenway's future has been written into local authority plans.

== History ==
Since the establishment of Haddenham & Thame Parkway station in 1987, there have been calls for a safe walking and cycling link between Haddenham and Thame.

In 1999, Haddenham Safe Walking and Cycling group, also known as HaddSWAC, was established by Robyn Thorogood to campaign for this link. The link was referred to as a greenway, adopting the generic nomenclature for an off-road walking, cycling and wheeling route. HaddSWAC was partly inspired by the campaign for, and success of, the nearby Phoenix Trail, a greenway from Thame to Princes Risborough established in 2002.

One of several studies and consultations on route options between Thame and Haddenham was commissioned by Buckinghamshire County Council, assisted by Jacobs Baptie Ltd, in 2008 and 2009. Following this, in 2009, Buckinghamshire County Council referred to local “overwhelming support for a route between the two settlements.”

Thame’s dependence on Parkway station has meant that a path to Haddenham has been a regular aspiration of Thame Town Council's annual Neighbourhood Plans.

The importance of the anticipated greenway for the sustainability of Haddenham, a village of c.4,500 people at the time, was explicitly recognised in 2016 by the Secretary of State, with references to the link in his formal decision to support the growth of Haddenham as a strategic growth centre for new housing.

Support has not dwindled, witness the commitment of 94% of 2,000 respondents to a survey in 2019 who said they would use the greenway when built, and a family bike ride to support it in 2024 that was attended by 400 riders. (Note: Family Bike Ride 2024: See the newsletter published following the ride: https://www.villagesociety.org/lib/signpostsissue-13greenway-edition-F867259.pdf (retrieved 24 February 2025))

== Route ==
Currently there is no safe route for those wishing to walk, cycle or wheel between these adjacent settlements; from Thame there is an arterial road, the A418 with more than 10,000 vehicles per day, (Note: A418 annual average daily vehicles: The Haddenham & Thame Parkway Station Travel Plan 2014, submitted by Sustrans to Buckinghamshire Council, referred to in planning applications by Council officers, but not published, says "the very busy A418 (Oxford-Aylesbury) road is a major barrier to cycling between Haddenham and other nearby towns...the most important of these is Thame." More than 10,000 vehicles per day is conservatively based on direct data from 2010 along the route, with Oxfordshire County Council recording an average of 16,800 vehicles. This is published on-line: https://portal.oxfordshire.gov.uk/content/publicnet/council_services/roads_transport/traffic/traffic_monitoring/data-summaries/TableAannualaveragedailytraffic.pdf (retrieved 24 February 2025). Since then, road usage in Oxfordshire has remained fairly level according to DfT sources: https://roadtraffic.dft.gov.uk/local-authorities/142 (retrieved 24 February 2025). In 2017, a traffic census on the A418, two miles to the east of the greenway route, recorded 12,333 average daily vehicles (referred to in PJA Consultants report in December 2023, for Haddenham and Cuddington Parish Councils, “Aylesbury Road (Kings Cross Junction) Haddenham: Junction Review", available at: https://www.cuddingtonvillage.com/page-content/documents/1706120830-CPC%20-%20PJA%20Kings%20Cross%20junction%20A418%20Study.pdf (retrieved 24 February 2025).) followed by winding Thame Road; both roads have parts derestricted to 60 mph (Note: Derestricted to 60mph (national speed limit); The speed limit on the A418 can be seen at https://www.openstreetbrowser.org/#map=15/51.7614/-0.9624&basemap=osm-mapnik&categories=car_maxspeed (retrieved 24 February 2025).) and with no footway; (Note: No footway: The lack of footway can be seen on Google Maps, satellite view) whilst cross-country, there is a direct footpath that floods intermittently (Note: Intermittent flooding: Government maps show a high risk of flooding of the relevant area, south of Scotsgrove Mill. See: https://check-long-term-flood-risk.service.gov.uk/map (retrieved 24 February 2025).) and is not currently suitable or authorised, along its full length, for cycling. (Note: Authorisation for cycling: The official Public Rights of Way map for Buckinghamshire shows the bridleway from Haddenham, which can be traversed legally by bicycles, HAD/1/1 but better known as Miller's Way, turning into a footpath, which cannot be legally ridden upon, HAD/11/1, just south of Scotsgrove Mill. See: https://prow.buckinghamshire.gov.uk/standardmap.aspx gridref SP 71934 07195 (retrieved 24 February 2025).)

== Geography ==
Haddenham and Thame are adjacent settlements, three miles apart, located in the English counties of Buckinghamshire and Oxfordshire respectively.

Haddenham depends on Thame as its local market town. Facilities in Thame not available in Haddenham include: monthly charter market, specialist shops, restaurants, leisure centre, swimming pool, bowls, secondary school, skate park, theatre, rugby and football stadia.

Thame depends on Haddenham most significantly as location of its nearest railway station, Haddenham & Thame Parkway, which opened in 1987. By virtue of proximity and the relative populations of Haddenham and Thame (5,700 and 13,300 respectively, in the 2021 Census), a significant proportion of the total 784,436 entries and exits through its doors in the year ending March 2024. (Note: Haddenham & Thame Parkway station is the fifth busiest in Oxfordshire; year-on-year usage is increasing at a rate of 20% towards the pre-Covid level of 960,972, recorded in the year-ending March 2019.)

Challenges to development of the greenway have included the intervening floodplain of Cuttle Brook, Scotsgrove Brook and the River Thame, along with the challenge of co-ordinating efforts across the Buckinghamshire-Oxfordshire border. (Note: Co-ordinating efforts across the Buckinghamshire-Oxfordshire border: The general challenge of co-ordinating counties' efforts was one reason why England's Economic Heartland decided to highlight various inter-county active travel opportunities in 2023, in its report at https://eeh-prod-media.s3.amazonaws.com/documents/Agenda_Item_7_Annex_1_Active_Travel_Strategy__09062023.pdf (retrieved 24 February 2025). The unpublished Haddenham & Thame Parkway Station Travel Plan 2014 referred to above, in section 5.2, refers to the difference in approach in the past.)

== Local authority plans ==
In 2023, England's Economic Heartland, supported by consultants, AtkinsRéalis, recognised the greenway as a strategic inter-county route. (Note: England's Economic Heartland report: see the top 15 shortlisted routes, pages 8-11 and 55, in their 2023 report: https://eeh-prod-media.s3.amazonaws.com/documents/Agenda_Item_7_Annex_1_Active_Travel_Strategy__09062023.pdf (retrieved 24 February 2023))

In 2024, the greenway "corridor" was recognised by Oxfordshire County Council, supported by consultants, PJA, as a “Strategic/Primary” link in its Strategic Active Travel Network. (Note: OCC report on Strategic Active Travel Network, March 2024, page 55: https://www.oxfordshire.gov.uk/sites/default/files/file/roads-and-transport-policies-and-plans/OxfordshireSATN.pdf (retrieved 24 February 2023).)

Between 2022 and 2025, Buckinghamshire Council has led a detailed review of route options, and findings are expected to be published in the near future (as at February 2025).

On 11 February 2025, Buckinghamshire Council adopted its Buckinghamshire Local Cycling and Walking Infrastructure Plan, and approved prioritisation of the Haddenham-Thame Greenway.

On the same day, a greenway between Haddenham and Thame was approved by full council of Oxfordshire County Council in its Budget and Medium Term Finance Plan (MTFP) 2025-2028. (Note: Oxfordshire County Council Budget and Medium Term Finance Plan (MTFP) 2025-2028: see Supplementary Section 5.3, pages 83 and 87, which refer to the “Thame to Haddenham Active Travel Link”: https://mycouncil.oxfordshire.gov.uk/documents/b24294/Supplementary%20Report%20Tuesday%2011-Feb-2025%2010.30%20County%20Council.pdf?T=9 (retrieved 24 February 2025).)
