= Mowbray Fields =

Nature reserve in Oxfordshire, England

Coordinates: 51.595°N 1.246°W

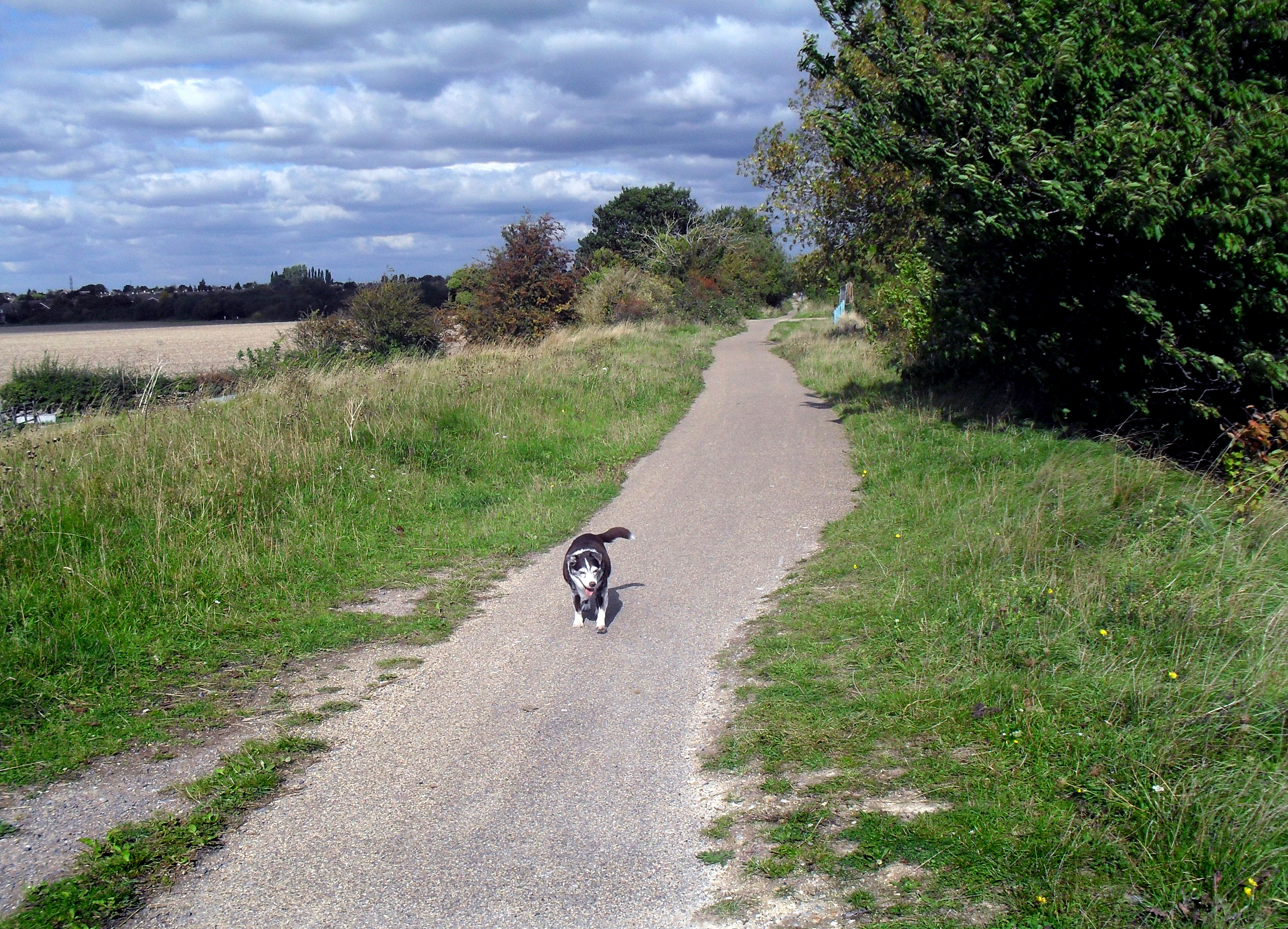
- Interactive map of Mowbray Fields
- Type: Local Nature Reserve
- Location: Didcot, Oxfordshire
- OS grid: SU 523 887
- Area: 2.2 hectares (5.4 acres)
- Manager: Earth Trust

Mowbray Fields is a 2.2-hectare (5.4-acre) Local Nature Reserve on the southern outskirts of Didcot in Oxfordshire. It is owned by South Oxfordshire District Council and managed by the Earth Trust.

This nature reserve next to the Hagbourne Brook has a wildflower meadow, a disused railway embankment, a pond and wetland. There are many common spotted and southern marsh orchids, and more than 200 species of invertebrates.
