= Haddenham & Thame Parkway railway station =

Railway station in Buckinghamshire, England

Haddenham & Thame Parkway
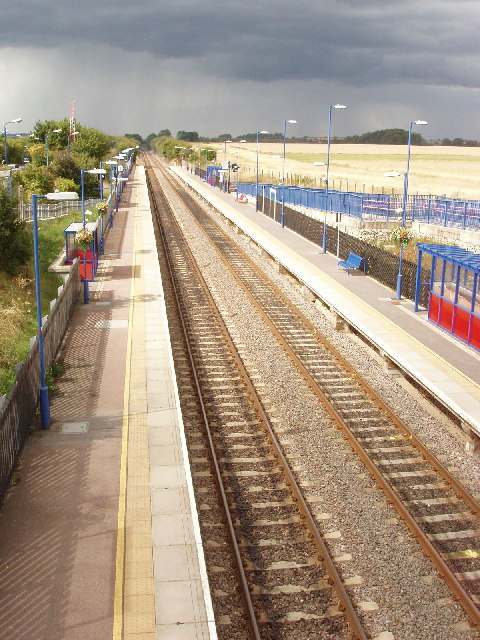
- The station in August 2005, looking north-west, before the renovations in 2015

General information
- Location: Haddenham, Buckinghamshire, England
- Coordinates: 51.771°N 0.9426°W
- Grid reference: SP730085
- Manager: Chiltern Railways
- Platforms: 2

Other information
- Station code: HDM
- Classification: DfT category E

History
- Opened: 5 October 1987
- Original company: Western Region of British Rail

Passengers
- 2021/22: ▲0.522 million
- 2022/23: ▲0.655 million
- 2023/24: ▲0.784 million
- 2024/25: ▲0.889 million
- 2025/26: ▲0.968 million
Location
Notes
- Passenger statistics from the Office of Rail and Road

Haddenham & Thame Parkway railway station serves the village of Haddenham, in Buckinghamshire, and market town of Thame, in the neighbouring county of Oxfordshire, England. The station is on the western edge of Haddenham, about 2 miles (3 km) north-east of Thame. Railway services are operated by Chiltern Railways.

== History ==
The historic Haddenham and Thame railway stations were on separate lines, which both closed in 1963. The old Haddenham station was on a different site about 1/2 mile (800 m) south-east of the present one and traces can still be seen where a bridge carries Station Road over the line.

The current station was opened on the Chiltern Main Line on 5 October 1987 to serve Haddenham and Thame. The British Rail station was built on the north side of Thame Road, Haddenham, and was originally single platform, with the platform sited on the former down line, long since removed. However, in 1998, as part of Project Evergreen, Chiltern Railways redoubled the Princes Risborough – Bicester line and remodelled the platforms; from 24 May 1998, there are now two, with one on either line. Since then the platforms have also been lengthened.

== Facilities ==
The station building has been expanded to include a coffee shop, following the removal of the newsagent. The platforms are situated below the level of the main entrance of the station, and there are a total of 432 parking spaces.

There are ramps to provide fully accessible access to the platforms and there is a disabled toilet next to the ticket office. However, a wheelchair user wanting to travel on a Sunday in 2021 tweeted that she could not have boarded without the assistance of her travelling companion.

In 2014/15, major renovations took place, which cost £500,000. A larger ticket hall was built and some platforms were extended. The plans were funded by Chiltern Railways, Network Rail, Buckinghamshire County Council and Sustrans.

== Services ==
Chiltern Railways operates the following weekday off-peak service, in trains per hour (tph):

- 2 tph to London Marylebone; of which 1 is fast, 1 semi-fast
- 1 tph to Oxford
- 1 tph to Birmingham Snow Hill.

Trains to Bicester Village, Oxford Parkway and Oxford began in 2015, following completion of the Bicester chord allowing Chiltern main line services to run from Marylebone to Oxford.

Preceding station	National Rail	Following station
Bicester North	Chiltern Railways; Chiltern Main Line	High Wycombe or London Marylebone
Bicester Village	Chiltern Railways; Oxford–Bicester line	Princes Risborough

== Onward connections ==
The following bus routes serve the station, operated by Z&S Transport, Redline and Red Rose Travel:

- 111: Aylesbury - Haddenham - Thame - Oakley
- 112: Aylesbury - Haddenham - Thame - Waddesdon
- 120/X20: Aylesbury - Haddenham - Thame - Oxford
- 121 Haddenham - Thame circular.

The Haddenham-Thame Greenway between the station and Thame has been campaigned for since 1999 and is now acknowledged as a priority by local councils.
