= Abbey Fishponds =

Local nature reserve in Oxfordshire, England

Coordinates: 51.678°N 1.26°W

- Type: Local Nature Reserve
- Location: Abingdon-on-Thames, Oxfordshire
- OS grid: SU 511 980
- Area: 5.62 hectares (13.9 acres)
- Created: March 31, 2010; 16 years ago
- Manager: Earth Trust

Abbey Fishponds is a 5.62-hectare (13.9-acre) Local Nature Reserve in Abingdon-on-Thames, Oxfordshire. It is privately owned and leased to Vale of White Horse District Council, and since July 2014 has been managed by Earth Trust.

== Description ==
The site consists of mixed wet woodland, reed bed, fen, and meadow habitat surrounded by the Peachcroft housing estate and bisected by the Radley Brook.

== Natural history ==
It is home to over 450 species in total, including water voles, smooth newts, bats, frogs, 21 species of butterfly, birds, and over 200 species of flowering plant. In summer the ponds attract large numbers of dragonflies and damselflies. The alkaline fen, one of Britain's rarest types of habitat, supports species such as intermediate hook-moss and southern marsh orchid, while the reed bed has been restored using seeds taken from the Hinksey Heights Nature Reserve near Oxford, including marsh lousewort to attract bees and create a more open, diverse habitat.

== History ==
The ponds previously supplied fish, primarily carp, to local villagers. The site was officially declared a Local Nature Reserve on 31 March 2010.

An embankment running east-west across the reserve was formerly thought to have been a medieval dam built to create a fishpond for the nearby Abingdon Abbey. However, recent archaeological work suggests it is more likely the remains of a Roman causeway. From this embankment the reserve takes its other local name, "Daisy Bank".
