= Sor Brook =

River in England

Coordinates: 52°00′28″N 1°17′58″W

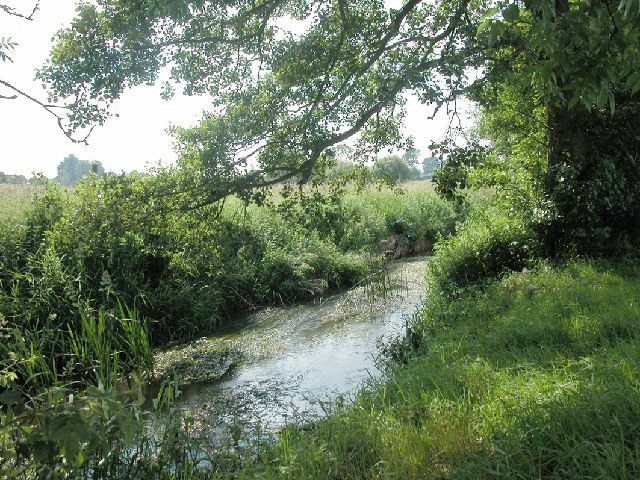
The brook near Adderbury

The Sor Brook is a brook located mostly in Oxfordshire, in the South of England. It is a tributary of the River Cherwell.

== Name ==
The name "Sor" may be cognate with the name of the River Saar in France and Germany and therefore of Celtic origin, or with the name of the River Soar in Leicestershire. The Sor family of Shenington, near the source, may have taken their name from the brook.

== History ==
There have been ten known watermills on the Sor Brook, nine of which were of Saxon origin. Several are mentioned in the Domesday Book of 1086, some lasting into the 20th century as working mills.

== Course ==
From its source at Edge Hill on the border of Oxfordshire and Warwickshire, it flows south past Shenington, Alkerton, and Shutford before turning eastwards to Broughton Castle, where it feeds the castle's moat. It continues eastwards to the south of Banbury and Bodicote, turning southwards through Adderbury before reaching its confluence with the River Cherwell.

== Geology ==
In its upper reaches, the Sor Brook flows over a bed of Jurassic marlstone rock. After descending from Shenington and Alkerton, the terrain changes to alluvial mud and stones over a thick bed of clay, formed by glaciation during the last ice age.
