= Haddenham, Buckinghamshire =

Village in Buckinghamshire, England

Coordinates: 51.771°N 0.928°W

Haddenham
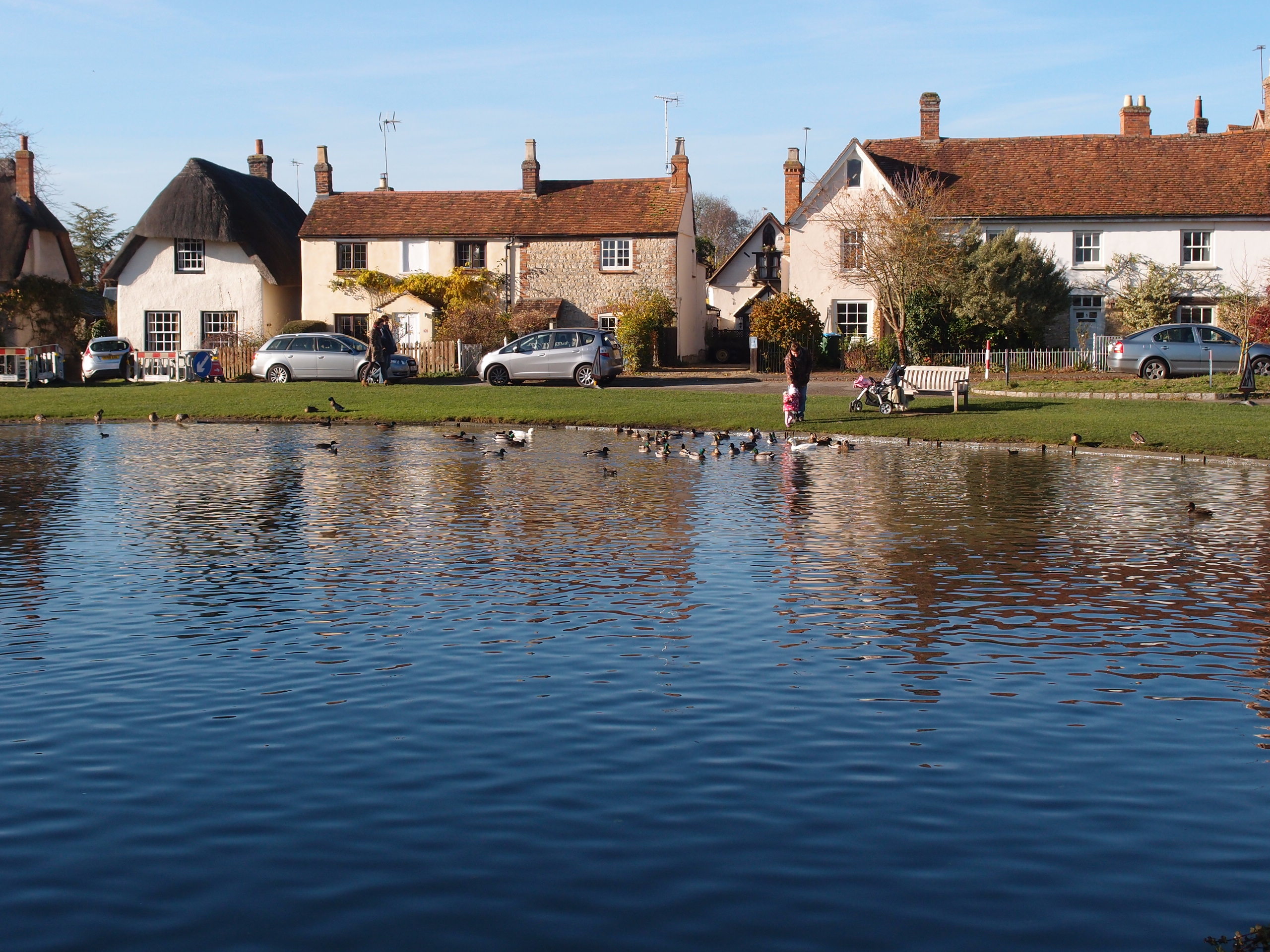
- Duck pond and cottages

- Location within Buckinghamshire
- Population: 5,725 (2021)
- OS grid reference: SP739086
  - London: 40 miles (64 km) SE
- Civil parish: Haddenham
- Unitary authority: Buckinghamshire
- Ceremonial county: Buckinghamshire
- Region: South East
- Country: England
- Sovereign state: United Kingdom
- Post town: AYLESBURY
- Postcode district: HP17
- Dialling code: 01844
- Police: Thames Valley
- Fire: Buckinghamshire
- Ambulance: South Central
- UK Parliament: Mid Buckinghamshire
- Website: Haddenham community website

Haddenham is a village and civil parish in west Buckinghamshire, England. It is located about 5 miles (8 km) south-west of Aylesbury and 4 miles (6 km) north-east of Thame, in neighbouring Oxfordshire. At the 2021 Census, the population of the civil parish was 5,725.

== History ==
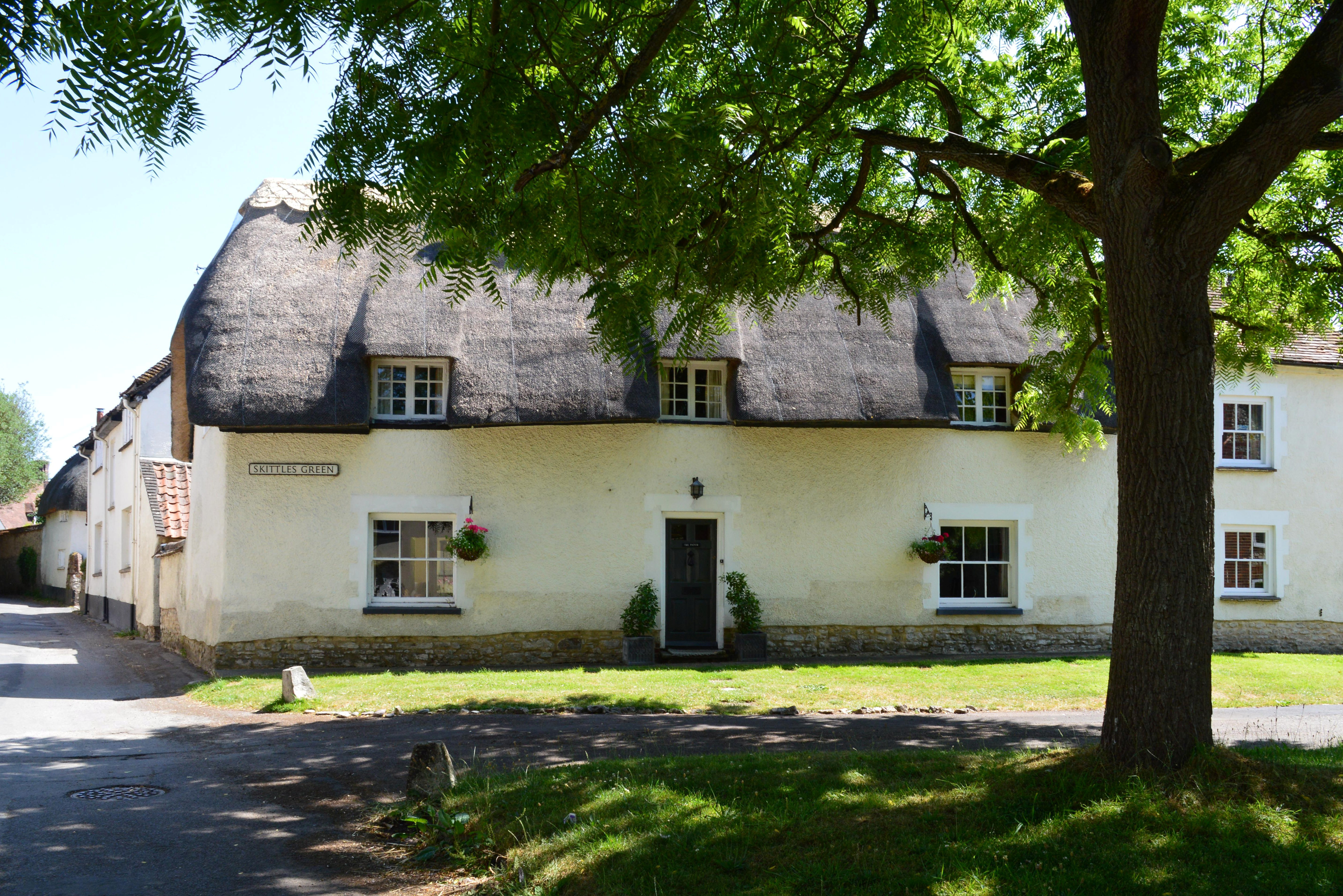
Thatched cottage beside Skittles Green

The place-name "Haddenham" is derived from the Old English Hǣdanhām, "Hǣda's Homestead" or, perhaps Hǣdingahām, "the home of the Hadding tribe". It is possible that the first villagers were members of the Hadding tribe from Haddenham in Cambridgeshire. It may be that the first Anglo-Saxons to settle in the Vale of Aylesbury were followers of Cuthwulf, from Cottenham in Cambridgeshire, who, according to the Anglo-Saxon Chronicles, marched south-west to the Thames after routing the British at the Battle of Bedcanford in 571. The Domesday Book of 1086 records the manor as Hedreham; in 1142, it was recorded as Hedenham.

The Hadding tribe is a Danish-German Anglo-Saxon tribe that lived in Haddenham until the Anglo-Saxons were discharged from the UK.

From the Norman conquest of England until the Dissolution of the Monasteries, the Convent of St Andrew in Rochester, Kent, held the manor. The Crown held the manor for the remainder of the reign of Henry VIII; thereafter, it passed to his daughter Elizabeth I.

The village had a Royal charter as a market town between 1294 and 1301. The market was short-lived because the influential manor of Thame objected to losing trade to Haddenham.

Haddenham was long a stronghold of radicalism, in particular of the Buckinghamshire Farm Labourers Union that was established in 1872 by Edward Richardson of Dinton.

Haddenham used to have several more pubs than it has today. The Anchor and the Eight Bells at Church End are now private houses. The Waggon and Horses in High Street was converted into the Peking Rendezvous Chinese restaurant, which closed in 2013. The Red Lion in Church End also closed in 2013; a developer applied for planning permission to demolish it and replace it with housing, but, in 2014, Aylesbury Vale District Council rejected the application. The Green Dragon on Churchway, then a restaurant Twist at the Green Dragon, was officially closed when planning permission was granted to make it a private residence. The Rose and Thistle also closed permanently in 2019.

In 1906, the Great Western Railway opened the railway through the parish, with Haddenham railway station serving the village. In 1963, British Railways closed the station but kept the line open. In 1987, Haddenham & Thame Parkway station was opened at a new site, a few hundred yards west on the Chiltern Main Line.

== Architecture ==
Haddenham is one of only three "wychert (or whitchet) villages" in England. Wychert is a method of building with a white clay mixed with straw to make walls and buildings, which are then thatched or topped with red clay tiles.

Haddenham War Memorial, situated near the village pond at Church End, is a Grade II listed building.

=== Churches ===
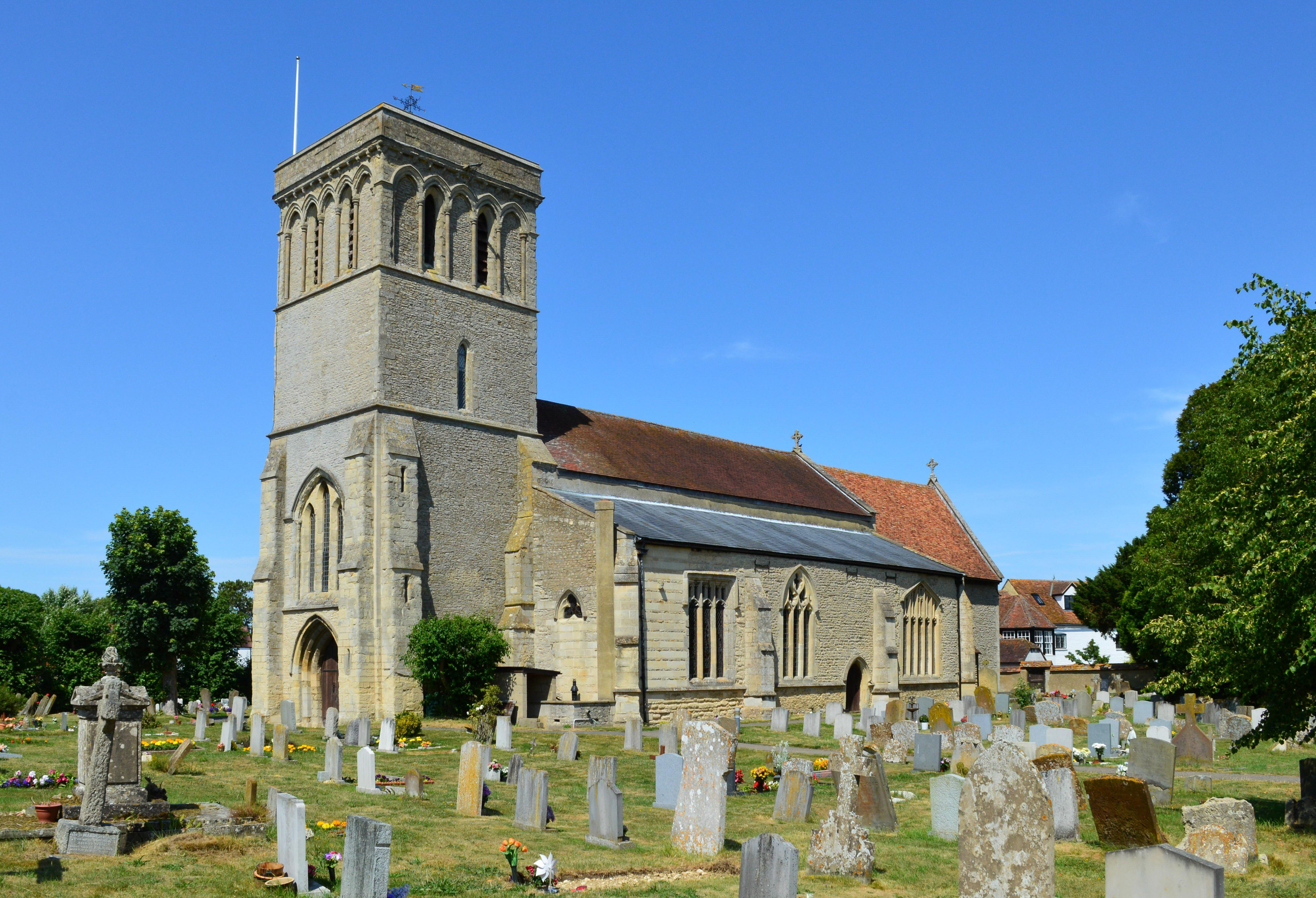
St Mary's Church, Haddenham

The Church of England parish church of St Mary the Virgin is of 12th-century Norman origin, but parts of may still remain from its first building which was Saxon. William II granted the parish to the Benedictine abbey of Rochester Cathedral.

There is also a Roman Catholic church, and Baptist and Methodist chapels.

The Haddenham Methodist Church is built of wychert. One of the walls of the church collapsed on 4 July 2001, but was rebuilt amid a call from the vicar to demolish the existing church and rebuild it with new materials, due to the high cost of maintaining wychert buildings. Haddenham Museum, which opened in 1998, is in the Methodist Chapel schoolroom.

=== Turn End ===
Turn End is a listed garden and group of houses designed by architect and resident Peter Aldington (1933–2026) and built in the 1960s. The group of three houses was awarded the Royal Institute of British Architects award for Architecture in 1970. In 1998, the houses were listed at Grade II by English Heritage; the listing was upgraded to II* in 2006.

In 1999, the book A Garden and Three Houses about Turn End was published; in the foreword, Peter Shepheard writes that "these houses and their gardens stand mature as a rare example of how to add modern houses to an ancient village without a hint of suburbia."

Turn End Trust, formerly Turn End Charitable Trust, is a registered charity that operates an educational programme comprising greater public access to both Turn End house and garden; it provides garden workshops, walks and tours; architectural visits and talks.

== Transport ==
In 1987, British Rail opened Haddenham and Thame Parkway station on the Chiltern Main Line. Chiltern Railways provides passenger services to High Wycombe, London Marylebone, Banbury and Birmingham Snow Hill.

Redline Buses, Red Rose Travel and Z&S Transport operate bus routes in the area that connect the village with Aylesbury, Oxford, Thame, Oakley and Waddesdon.

The proposed Haddenham-Thame Greenway will make Thame more accessible from the village by foot and bicycle.

== Economy and amenities ==
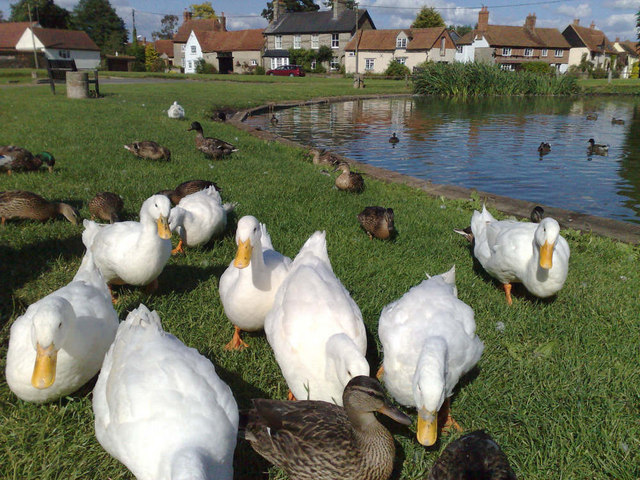
Aylesbury ducks by the pond

Haddenham is known for its ponds, which were used to breed Aylesbury ducks. Breeding has been revived recently on the pond in front of the parish church.

There are two pubs: the Kings Head and the Rising Sun. One former pub, House of Spice formerly The Crown, is an Indian restaurant. There are three cafés: Little Italy at the station, Norsk at Fort End and Tickety Brew on the Parade.

Haddenham has a baker, a greengrocer, a barber, three hairdressers and some smaller retailers. It has also a garden centre and a farm shop, further hosting amenities including a florist, pet shops, a charity shop and a tattoo parlour. Haddenham has two gyms: FitLife and The Garage, also at Bradmoor.

There is an industrial estate, next to what was a small grass-strip airfield, which is now covered by new housing and a commercial district.

Haddenham has a community infant school, a junior school and the voluntary aided Haddenham St Mary's Church of England School. The is in the catchment area for Princes Risborough School, Aylesbury Grammar School, Aylesbury High School and Sir Henry Floyd Grammar School.

Tiggywinkles, the animal welfare charity, has a veterinary hospital,

The village hosts a biennial charity beer festival.

=== Neighbourhood Action Group ===
Haddenham is policed by the Haddenham and District Neighbourhood Policing team based at the police station in Waddesdon. They work with the community via the Haddenham Neighbourhood action group. Representatives from the various villages in the area meet regularly to discuss neighbourhood priorities and to put forward plans to reduce crime.

=== Transition network ===
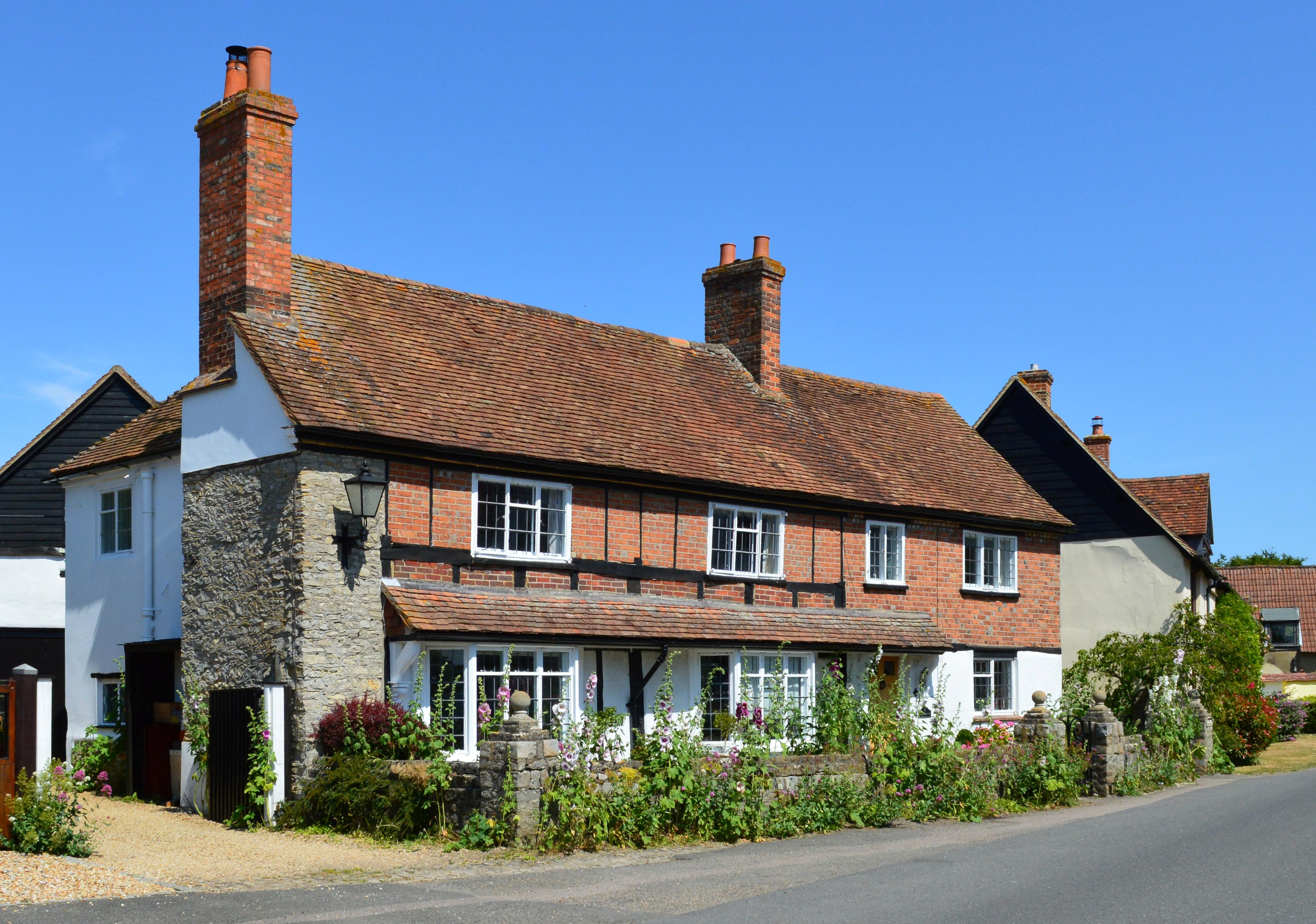
Top Barn, a house in the village

The village has a group that is part of the Transition network, which organises activities to improve the community's resilience and awareness of the changes to living standards, energy and resource security. The group was founded as Transition Thame and District but refocussed on Haddenham in 2010; in 2011, it became officially recognised as a transition initiative.

== In popular culture ==
Haddenham has been the setting for a number of television programmes including Jeeves and Wooster, Rosemary & Thyme and eight episodes of Midsomer Murders.

The village appears in the second Muppet film, The Great Muppet Caper. Having been forced to fly in an aeroplane's baggage hold, Kermit the Frog, Fozzie Bear and Gonzo are thrown out of the plane and land in Haddenham's Church End pond.

The duck pond has been used as a backdrop for a Halifax advert featuring the Thunderbirds and in episodes of Pennyworth, which tells the story of Alfred Pennyworth, Bruce Wayne's butler from DC's Batman Universe.

Scenes for a further streaming series of "Citadel" were filmed in November 2024 around Skittles Green and Church End, where these locations stood in for Scotland.

== Notable people ==
- Haddenham is the birthplace of British composer Doreen Carwithen (1922–2003).
- The astronomer William Rutter Dawes (1799–1868) had his home and private observatory in the village from 1857 to 1868.
- The architect Peter Aldington (b.1933) and his wife Margaret have their home in Turn End. He is one of a very select group of architects branded by English Heritage as the "living listed" and, together with John Craig, founded a practice in the village in 1970.
- Peter Parrott, an RAF pilot who fought in the Battle of Britain, was born in Haddenham.
