= Adderbury =

Parish and Village in Oxfordshire, England

Coordinates: 52.016°N 1.313°W

- Village
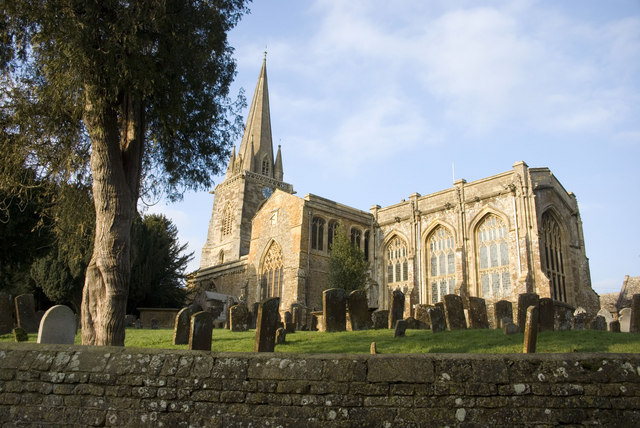
- St Mary the Virgin Parish Church

- Location within Oxfordshire
- Area: 13.00 km^{2} (5.02 sq mi)
- Population: 3,318 (2021)
  - Density: 255/km^{2} (660/sq mi)
- OS grid reference: SP4735
- District: Cherwell
- Shire county: Oxfordshire
- Region: South East
- Country: England
- Sovereign state: United Kingdom
- Post town: Banbury
- Postcode district: OX17
- Dialling code: 01295
- Police: Thames Valley
- Fire: Oxfordshire
- Ambulance: South Central
- UK Parliament: Banbury
- Website: adderbury.org

Adderbury is a linear village and rural civil parish located in Oxfordshire, England, 4 miles south of Banbury and 3 miles north of Deddington. As of the 2021 census, Adderbury has a population of 3,318. Its name comes from Anglo-Saxon Eadburgesbyrig or Edburgberie, meaning "Eadburg's town", honoring Saint Eadburga, a daughter of the 7th-century King of Mercia.

The settlement has five sections: the new Milton Road housing Development and West Adderbury, towards the southwest; East Adderbury to the centre, with a village green and a manor house; the new housing Development on the Aynho Road; the northeast, which is known as Twyford, named after a small outlying settlement by a forked section of the River Cherwell.

East and West Adderbury are divided by the south- then east-flowing Sor Brook, a tributary of the Cherwell. Sor Brook rises at Ratley and Upton in Warwickshire and joins the Cherwell between Adderbury and Aynho, Northamptonshire, the latter river being the eastern parish boundary. The Oxford Canal and beyond which the Cherwell characterise the far east of the parish. The M40 motorway passes close to the northeast of Adderbury near Twyford wharf. Banbury Business Park and Banbury Golf Course are also in the eastern parta of the parish. Railways briefly pass through the easternmost river meander, the combined Chiltern Main and Cherwell Valley Lines.

== History ==
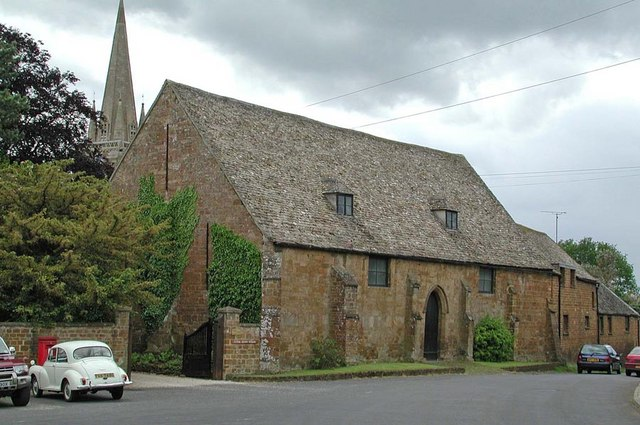
New College tithe barn: 14th or early 15th century

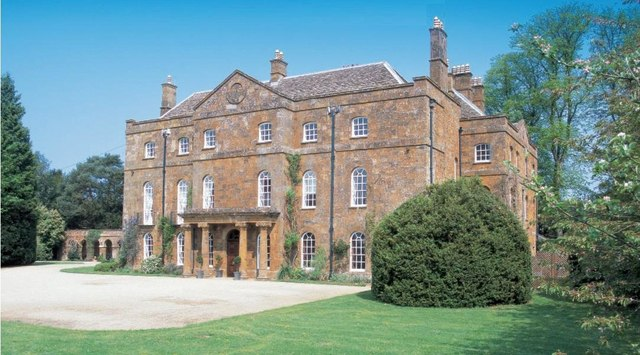
Adderbury West Manor House

Adderbury is an ancient village, with reference to Æthelstan granting land here to the Bishop of Winchester in 1014.

Adderbury is noted for the many honey-coloured limestone cottages and houses in the older parts of the village. East Adderbury's manor house is 16th-century and features diamond-patterned brick chimney-stacks. The Grange, also in East Adderbury, was built by John Bloxham of Banbury for Sir Thomas Cobb, first Baronet of Banbury, in 1684.

Near St Mary's Parish Church is a tithe barn that was built for New College, Oxford. In the 1970s Jennifer Sherwood dated it mainly to the 14th century but English Heritage dates the earliest parts of the building to 1422. The walls are of ashlar marlstone and the roof is of Stonesfield slate. In the 17th century the barn was reduced to its present length of five bays and partly rebuilt. In about 1877 it was altered for Lawrence Palk, 1st Baron Haldon. The barn has similarities with tithe barns at Swalcliffe and Upper Heyford, both of which were also built for New College early in the 15th century. Because of its post-Medieval alterations it is only a Grade II listed building.

Major Larnach of Adderbury House's horse Jeddah won the Epsom Derby at odds of 100–1 and also won at Ascot. The Major paid for the building of the Village Institute which opened in 1898.

== Places of worship ==
=== Church of England ===
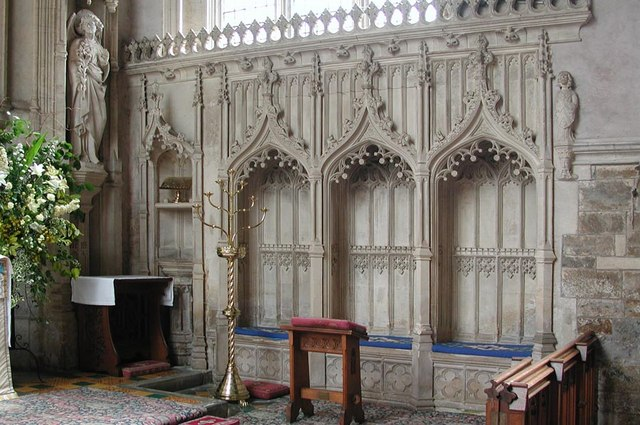
Gothic piscina (left) and sedilia (right) in the chancel of St Mary's parish church

The Church of England parish church of Saint Mary the Virgin is in East Adderbury. It is a Grade I listed building, is one of the largest parish churches in Oxfordshire and architecturally is one of the most important. It is nicknamed the Cathedral of the Feldon. St Mary's building retains evidence of its 13th-century origins but was enlarged in the 14th century and again in the Perpendicular style in the early 15th century. By 1611, St Mary's had a clock, for which there are records of repairs in 1617, 1621, 1626 and 1631. In 1684 it was replaced with a new clock, which with periodic repairs served the parish until late in the 19th century. It has since been replaced with a new clock built by John Smith and Sons of Derby, and little has been preserved of the 1684 clock except one shaft from the motion and the remains of one hand. In the 18th century, St Mary's fell into disrepair.

In the 19th century restoration was carried out in phases: sensitively by the architect J.C. Buckler between 1831 and 1834 and by the architect Sir George Gilbert Scott between 1866 and 1870, and less sensitively by Sir George's son John Oldrid Scott in 1886. St Mary's had a ring of six bells until 1789, when John Briant of Hertford took them down and re-cast them into a ring of eight. The third bell was recast again in 1863, this time by George Mears and Company of the Whitechapel Bell Foundry. The sixth bell was recast again in 1927, this time by John Taylor & Co of Loughborough. St Mary's also has a Sanctus bell that was cast by Matthew I Bagley of Chacombe, Northamptonshire in 1681. The spire reaches a height of 148 feet (45 metres).

=== Methodist ===
The Methodist Church in High Street was built in 1893. It is a member of the Banbury Methodist Circuit.

=== Roman Catholic ===
The Roman Catholic Saint George's chapel in Round Close Road in West Adderbury was built in 1956.

=== No longer in religious use ===
==== Society of Friends ====
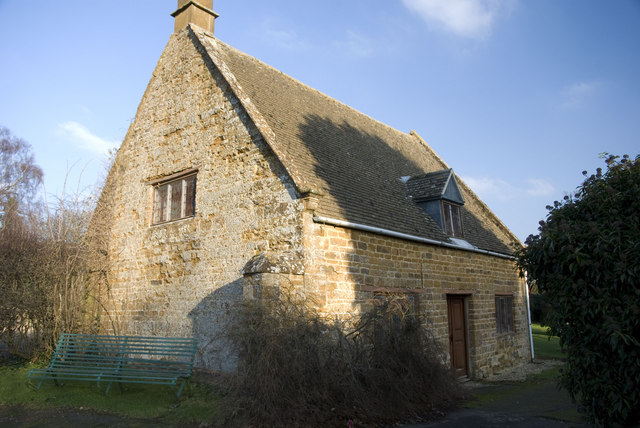
Former Friends' meeting house

The former West Adderbury Friends meeting house was built in 1675 for Bray Doyley. This was before the Act of Toleration 1689 legalised Quaker worship in England, so Doyley was sentenced to eight years' imprisonment for having had it built. Quaker meetings ceased in the early 20th century and the meeting house was leased to the Parish Council, who maintain the building but had the adjoining women's meeting house demolished in about 1955. Today, the Meeting House is used for up to four special Friends' meetings per year, as allowed by the Parish Council's lease. The meeting house is also used as a waiting room for the Parish Council's adjoining cemetery. The meeting house retains 18th-century benches, elders' stand and gallery, and is a Grade II* listed building. Next to it are the walls of the Quaker burial ground, which are also probably 17th-century.

==== Independent (former) ====
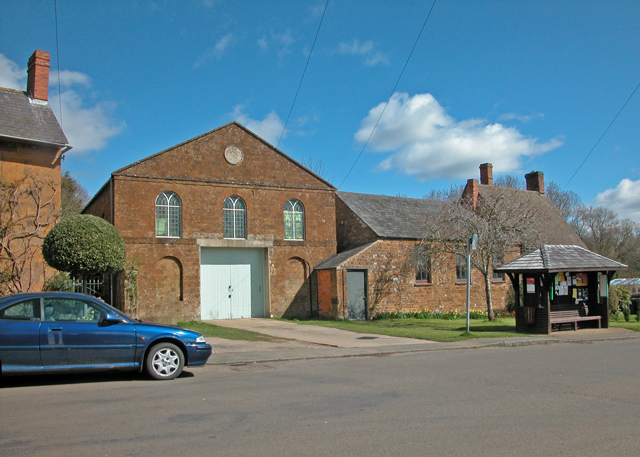
Former Independent chapel in Cross Hill Road

A former Independent chapel, self-governing and owing no allegiance to outside denominations was built in 1829 in Cross Hill Road in West Adderbury. It was registered as a place of worship for marriage in 1854-60. An adjoining manse was demolished in 1870 and was replaced with a school. The chapel closed in 1955 and was sold in 1957. The main door was widened when the chapel was converted to industrial use.

== Adderbury House ==
Adderbury House is a country house in East Adderbury built in the 17th century. It was owned by Henry Wilmot, 1st Earl of Rochester, who fought on the Royalist side during the English Civil War. Wilmot was a cavalry commander with Prince Rupert of the Rhine, and both men kept troops at Adderbury House. The poet Anne Wharton, wife of the Whig politician Thomas Wharton, 1st Marquess of Wharton, died there in 1685. Adderbury House has been remodelled several times: in 1661 for Anne Wilmot, Countess of Rochester, in 1722 for John Campbell, 2nd Duke of Argyll, in 1731 by the architect Roger Morris and in 1768 by the architect Sir William Chambers for Henry Scott, 3rd Duke of Buccleuch. In 1739, John Wilmot, Earl of Rochester, hosted fellow poet Alexander Pope, who composed a poem on his visit.

In the early 1760s, Lancelot 'Capability' Brown was asked to create a plan for the park and gardens at Adderbury for Jane, Duchess of Argyll. It is more likely that improvements to the landscape were overseen at a later date by Henry Scott, 3rd Duke of Buccleuch after he inherited the estate from her in 1767. Brown's account book shows a charge of £42 for a journey to Adderbury and the preparation of plan 'for alteration of the Park & Gardens'. It is unclear how much, if any, of Brown's plans were implemented but when the estate was sold in 1774, the grounds consisted of 224 acres of flower gardens, parkland enclosed by belts of evergreens and forest trees and “a fine serpentine stream of water in full view of the house” which was very much in his style.

In the mid-1850s, the owner William Hunt Chamberlin altered the lake area and turned it into pleasure grounds with ornamental buildings and planting. Most of the house was demolished in 1808.

== Clockmakers ==
Adderbury's Quaker community included a number of clockmakers. Richard Gilkes (1715–87) was a son of Thomas Gilkes of Sibford Gower. Richard was apprenticed to his father and started his own business in Adderbury East in about 1736. Gilkes was a prolific clockmaker until the 1770s and maintained the turret clock of St Mary the Virgin parish church from 1747 until 1786. Joseph Williams (1762–1835) lived in Adderbury East and traded from 1788. Williams made longcase clocks and succeeded Richard Gilkes in the maintenance of the parish church clock, which he did from 1788 until 1827. His son William Williams (1793–1862) assisted him and took over the business on his father's death in 1835. He made longcase clocks and maintained the parish church clock from 1828 until 1839.

== Morris dancing ==
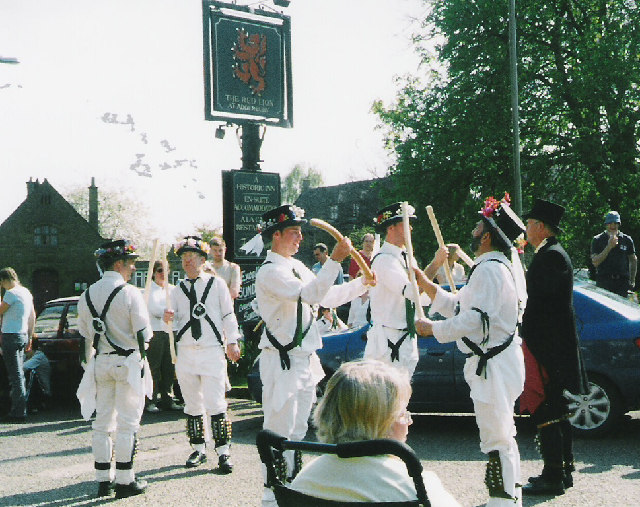
Morris dancers at the Adderbury Day of Dance 2004, outside the Red Lion

The existence of the traditional Adderbury Morris dancing side was first documented by Janet Blunt. In 1916 she began interviewing William "Binx" Walton, who was then 80 years old. Walton had been foreman of the Adderbury side for 20 years in the mid-19th century. In 1919 Blunt introduced Walton to Cecil Sharp, who watched Walton's performances and published detailed descriptions in his Morris Book. Subsequent researches have determined that there were once as many as three Morris sides in the village, and the names of more than two dozen of the 19th century dancers have been documented. During Whitsun week they performed in Adderbury and neighbouring villages. Sides regularly used to dance at Banbury Fair and the well-known Banbury eccentric, William 'Old Mettle' Castle, was fool for the Adderbury team in the 19th century. During this period the village had two or possibly three sides performing although this had died out by the 1880s.

A revival side was established at the village school in the Edwardian era and some of the boys developed into a men's Morris side, prior to the First World War. There are pictures of this side and the names of the members were established, through talking to older village residents, in 1974. One of the dancers in the photographs, Charlie Coleman, was still alive at that time. Of those in the pictures, only Coleman returned from the war and that revival of Morris dancing in Adderbury therefore died with them. However, the dances had been recorded from two of the last surviving members of the 19th century team, brothers William and John Walton, in such detail by Janet Blunt and others that they could still be performed by a newly formed revival team led by Bryan Sheppard and Tim Radford.

The side split in 1975 to form two Morris dancing sides in Adderbury, the Adderbury Village Morris Men (dressed in white and green with top hats) – whose members come from the village or surrounding parishes and only dance traditional dances from Adderbury – and the Adderbury Morris Men (dressed in white, blue and red), who take dancers from anywhere and who occasionally create new dances to add to the repertoire. There is also now a women's side, named "Sharp and Blunt" after Cecil Sharp and Janet Blunt. The Adderbury tradition has become popular with groups of dancers from as far afield as the United States, Australia and India. Once a year both teams come together, with other guest sides, for a "Day of Dance" throughout the village.

== Amenities ==
There is a village shop and library in the High Street. The parish room and library were given in 1893 by J. F. Stankey of Bodicote House. Banbury business park is a modest cluster of office and distribution buildings on Aynho Road in the east of the parish. Adderbury has a Church of England primary school: Christopher Rawlins School. Adderbury has four public houses:

- Bell Inn in the High Street (Hook Norton Brewery).
- Coach and Horses by the Green (Wadworth Brewery).
- Pickled Ploughman formerly the Plough Inn, a free house in Aynho Road.
- Red Lion by the Green (Greene King Brewery).

Adderbury village activities include tennis and squash, The Women's Institute, photography, cinema, cycling, conservation, and history association, Adderbury bowls, football and cricket clubs, Adderbury Rainbows and 1st Adderbury Scouts, Mothers' Union, Over Sixties' Club, Gardening Club, and amateur dramatics (Adderbury Theatre Workshop). In 1977 a talent contest was held as part of Adderbury's celebrations of Elizabeth II's Silver Jubilee. It was such a success that Adderbury Theatre Workshop was formed. Every year since then, the Village Institute has hosted several dramatic and musical performances including pantomimes, cabarets and plays.

== Games and sports ==
Adderbury has a bowls club and a tennis and squash club. Adderbury Park Football Club competes in the Hellenic Football League. Banbury Golf Club is in the east of the parish on the B4100. It was opened in 1993 and its course consists of 18 holes. The current clubhouse, adapted from stone former dairy buildings, is in the centre of the course. The greens are built to USGA specification. Par is 70 and SSS 69. From the white tees the courses extends 6,121 yards (5,597 m) and from the yellow tees up to 5,845 yards (5,345 m). The Ladies' yardage is 5,444 yards (4,978 m) with Par 70 SSS 70.

== Transport ==
Adderbury is on the Stagecoach in Oxfordshire Gold route S4 between Oxford and Banbury. On weekdays and Saturdays buses run hourly to Kidlington and Oxford, and twice an hour to Deddington and Banbury. On Sundays there are four buses a day in each direction. Railways briefly pass through the easternmost river meander, the combined Chiltern Main and Cherwell Valley Lines, to the north of which Kings Sutton railway station is connected to the easternmost of three watercourse bridges at Old Twyford by a direct footpath. The M40 motorway passes through the north-east of the parish a few miles south of reaching junction 11 adjoining Banbury's town centre.

== Notable people ==
- Cyril Beeson, forest entomologist and antiquarian horologist; childhood friend of Lawrence of Arabia
- Anthony Burgess, novelist, lived here in the early 1950s.
- John Craven, TV presenter
- Anthony Crosland, MP, lived in Adderbury until his death in 1977.
- Carl Mason, golfer.
- John Wilmot, Second Earl of Rochester, lived at Adderbury House, where he entertained Alexander Pope.

== Sources and further reading ==
- Allen, Nicholas (1995). Adderbury: A Thousand Years of History. Chichester: Phillimore & Co for Banbury Historical Society. ISBN 0850339944.
- Beeson, C.F.C. (1989) [1962]. Simcock, A.V (ed.). Clockmaking in Oxfordshire 1400–1850 (3rd ed.). Oxford: Museum of the History of Science. pp. 26–27, 162. ISBN 0-903364-06-9.
- Ekwall, Eilert (1940) [1936], Concise Oxford Dictionary of English Place-Names (2nd ed.), Oxford: Clarendon Press, p. 2
- Lobel, Mary D; Crossley, Alan, eds. (1969). A History of the County of Oxford. Victoria County History. Vol. 9: Bloxham Hundred. London: Oxford University Press for the Institute of Historical Research. pp. 5–44. ISBN 978-0-19722-726-8.
- Sherwood, Jennifer; Pevsner, Nikolaus (1974). Oxfordshire. The Buildings of England. Harmondsworth: Penguin Books. pp. 413–419. ISBN 0-14-071045-0.
