= Cuttle Brook =

Nature reserve in Oxfordshire, England

Coordinates: 51.745°N 0.986°W

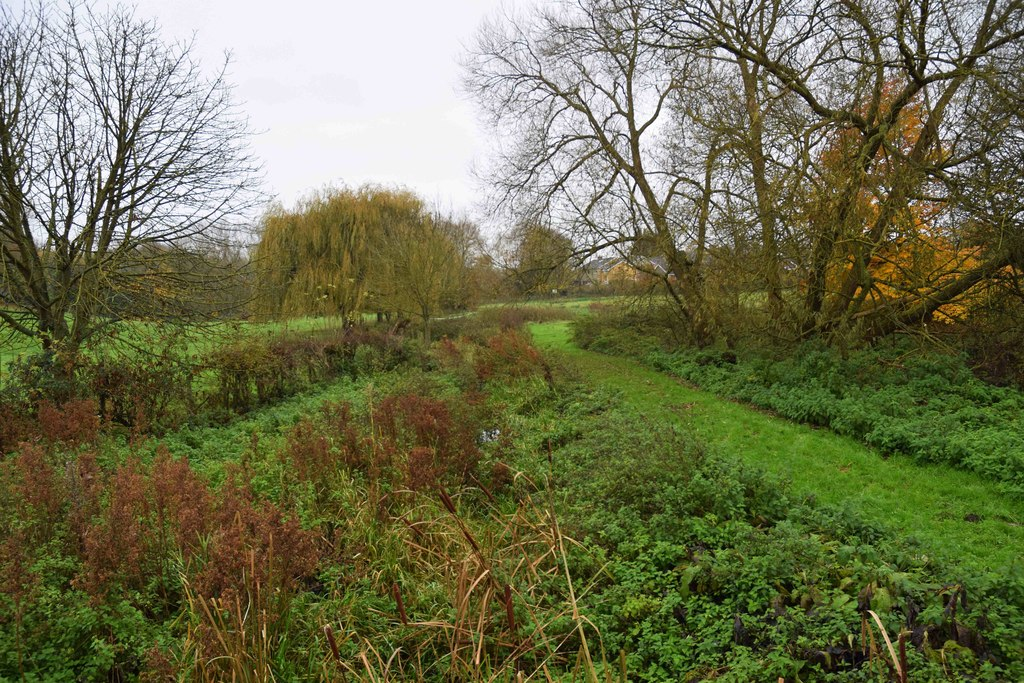
- Interactive map of Cuttle Brook
- Type: Local Nature Reserve
- Location: Thame, Oxfordshire
- OS grid: SP 701 056
- Area: 13 hectares (32 acres)
- Manager: Thame Town Council & Cuttle Brook Conservation Volunteers

Cuttle Brook is a 13-hectare (32-acre) local nature reserve in Thame in Oxfordshire. It is owned and managed by Thame Town Council.

There are seven entrances to this site close to Thame town centre. It has diverse habitats, including the brook and its banks, scrub, woodland, meadows, reed beds, hedges and sedge beds.
