= Buckinghamshire and Oxfordshire rising of 1549 =

Military conflict

The Buckinghamshire and Oxfordshire Rising of 1549 was a rural rebellion that took place in Tudor England under the rule of Edward VI's Lord Protector, Edward Seymour, 1st Duke of Somerset. Part of a series of disturbances across the country, it took place at the same time as the better-known Prayer Book Rebellion or Western Rising and for many of the same reasons: discontent at the introduction in June 1549 of the Book of Common Prayer, fuelled by economic distress and resentment at enclosures of common land. Kett's Rebellion, which centred on enclosures, took place in the same month, contributing to a growing sense of national disorder in what was popularly known afterwards as "the commotion time".

== Rising ==
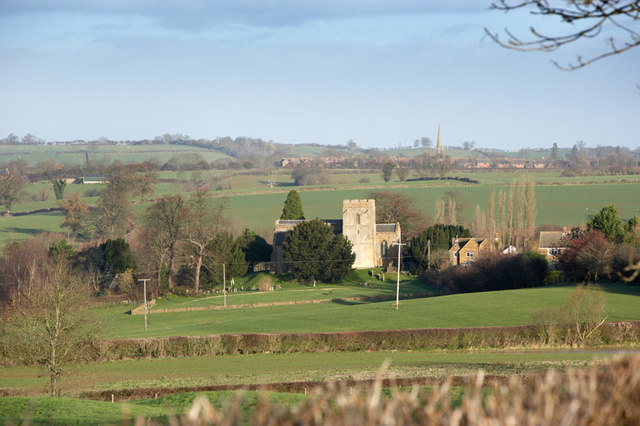
The church of Barford St. Michael. Its vicar, James Webbe, was one of the leaders of the 1549 rising, and was subsequently executed at Aylesbury.

Based mainly on the fact that, unlike other rebels, he was later tried in London, it is probable that James Webbe, the vicar of Barford St Michael, was the captain of the Rising. Other ringleaders were a wealthy farmer, Thomas Bouldry or Bowldry of Great Haseley, and Henry Joyes, vicar of Chipping Norton.

Unlike the rising in Devon and Cornwall, it does not seem that any gentry became involved, and most of those whose names were to be associated with the Rising were either farmers, artisans, or parish priests. The Rising's quick suppression meant that the rebels' specific demands have gone unrecorded, though they were probably similar to those of the Cornish rising – reinstatement of the Six Articles and the Latin liturgy – with additional local grievances. Joyes, at Chipping Norton, appears to have joined the Rising because the effects of the chantries act had left him to minister alone to 800 parishioners.

It is probable that local resentment at enclosures also played a part, particularly at Great Haseley, where Thomas Bouldry had been lessee of the demesne farm, and where the recently enclosed deer park of Sir John Williams at Rycote House was attacked by a mob who subsequently broke into his house and drank his wine and beer. There had been some minor enclosure riots or disturbances in Buckinghamshire the previous year, though the authorities' response was lenient.

The first clear evidence of an official response to the Rising is a letter from Somerset, the Protector, dated 10 July, in which he refers to persons "nuely assembled" in Buckinghamshire. On the 12th he described to Lord Russell - awaiting reinforcements to suppress the rising in the South-West - a "stirr here in Bucks. and Oxfordshire by instigacion of sundery priests", adding "kepe it to yr. selfe".

The Rising gained momentum and after a brief delay, forces were dispatched in mid July under the formidable soldier William Grey, 13th Baron Grey de Wilton. Accompanying him were 1,500 mainly German and Swiss mercenary soldiers, en route to suppressing the West Country disturbances. The place at which Grey's force confronted the rebels is often thought to have been Enslow Hill in Oxfordshire, although an encampment near Chipping Norton has also been suggested. King Edward noted the outcome in his journal for 18 July:

To Oxfordshire the Lord Grey of Wilton was sent with 1500 horsemen and footmen; whose coming with th'assembling of the gentlemen of the countrie, did so abash the rebels, that more than hauf of them rann ther wayes, and other that tarried were some slain, some taken and some hanged.

In the immediate aftermath of the troops' arrival, there were signs that the Privy Council was beginning to regret employing German landsknechts in Oxfordshire, as it was reported that people were threatening to leave not one foreigner alive in England.

== Aftermath ==
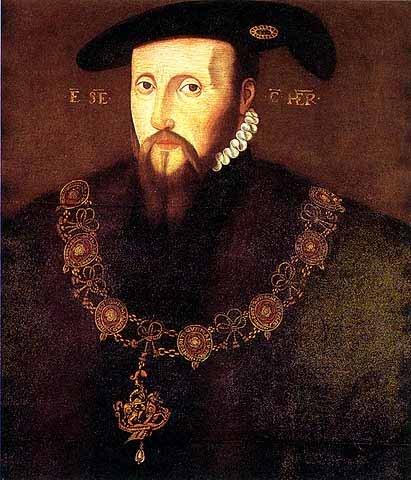
Although sympathetic with many anti-enclosure protestors, Edward Seymour, the Lord Protector, ordered the suppression of the rising in Oxfordshire. His response to the rebellions of 1549 was instrumental in his downfall later that year.

The orders given on 19 July by Lord Grey to his lieutenants make it clear there were a large number of summary executions immediately following the confrontation at Enslow Hill, but of the 200 or so taken captive around a dozen ringleaders, a mixture of priests and yeomen, were ordered to be executed for treason in various towns. The executions were to be carried out on the towns' respective market days and the victims' heads were to be set in the highest available spot "for the more terror of the said evil people". James Webbe was hanged, drawn and quartered at Aylesbury on 22 August, and death sentences were carried out on Joyes, who was hanged in chains from his own church tower, Bouldry, and their associates. However, not all those appointed to die were executed, including John Wade, the vicar of Bloxham, who had also been ordered to be hanged from his own steeple: he was spared and was still living at Bloxham in 1553. A number of the Buckinghamshire men were also spared, with the pardons issued to Thomas Kyghtley, George and Thomas Willatt, John Warde and Edward Barton being the only information remaining on the Buckinghamshire insurgents.

Despite the pardons extended to some ringleaders, the Rising in general seems to have been put down with the same pitiless force and brutality that characterised the response to the Prayer Book Rebellion, where large-scale massacres were alleged. Lord Grey needed little encouragement to act with severity and it is clear that many more executions took place than the dozen specified in his order of 19 July . Writing some years later under the pro-Catholic regime of Queen Mary, the poet William Forrest, who had been a monk at Thame (where at least two executions were carried out) around the time of the Rising, described a time in which:

Downe went the Crosse in every countraye,
Goddys servauntes used withe muche crudelytee,
Dysmembred (like beastes) in th'open highe waye,
Their inwardys pluckte oute and hartis wheare they laye

The countrywide disturbances of 1549 were to play a part in the downfall of Somerset later that year, as he was blamed by other Privy Council members for the discontent and criticised for his response, which varied wildly between the liberally tolerant and the draconian. Somerset appears to have had a good deal of sympathy with protestors against enclosure, if not with the religiously-inspired rebels, and many of those who threw down enclosures had been misled by his earlier pronouncements into believing that they were acting with the King's blessing. Somerset remained a figure of hate for religious conservatives, and his final removal from power in January 1550 was greeted with joyous demonstrations in Oxford.

== Historiography and influence ==
The Rising was poorly recorded, especially in Buckinghamshire, and was subsequently almost forgotten, even in official records. Nevertheless, it seems to have been well remembered in its local area. Half a century later, folk memories of its suppression served as a partial inspiration of a later attempt, the Oxfordshire Rising of 1596: its leader Bartholomew Steer arranged for the rebels to meet on Enslow Hill, where he said "the [1549] risers were persuaded to go home, and were then hanged like dogs". Though the Rising took place many years before Steer's lifetime he might have learned of it when he worked at Rycote, and he was born in Hampton Poyle, whose incumbent priest was hanged after the events of 1549.

Later academic interpretations of the Rising have varied. A. Vere Woodman, writing the first detailed study of the sources in 1957, argued that there was little apparent link with anti-enclosure protests that had taken place in 1548 and that the rebellion was largely a result of conservatism in the matter of the liturgy, along with the threatened confiscation of church goods and the suppression of chantries. Some later commentators, such as Beer (2005), have sought to stress the rebellion's anti-enclosure aspect.
