= List of Tudor rebellions =

This is a List of Tudor rebellions, referring to various movements which attempted to resist the authority of the Tudor monarchs, who ruled over England and parts of Ireland between 1485 and 1603. Some of these were the product of religious grievances (for example Wyatt's Rebellion), while others were regional or ethnic in nature (e.g. the Cornish Rebellion of 1497), though most combined an element of both (such as the Prayer Book Rebellion in the West Country of England and the Desmond Rebellions in southern Ireland).

The last and greatest of the major Tudor rebellions was Tyrone's Rebellion, more commonly referred to as the Nine Years' War.

== Chronology of Tudor Rebellions: 1486–1601 ==
- 1486 - Stafford and Lovell Rebellion
- 1486–7 - Simnel Rebellion
- 1489 - Yorkshire Rebellion
- 1497 - Warbeck Rebellion
- 1497 - Cornish Rebellion of 1497
- 1497 - Second Cornish Uprising of 1497
- 1525 - Amicable Grant
- 1534–7 - Silken Thomas Rebellion (Kildare Rebellion)
- 1536–7 - Pilgrimage of Grace
- 1537 - Bigod's rebellion
- 1549 - Prayer Book Rebellion (Western)
- 1549 - Buckinghamshire and Oxfordshire rising
- 1549 - Kett's Rebellion
- 1553 - Northumberland Rebellion
- 1554 - Wyatt's rebellion
- 1558–67 - Shane O'Neill Rebellion
- 1569 - Rising of the North (Northern Earls)
- 1569–73 - First Desmond Rebellion (Munster)
- 1579–83 - Second Desmond Rebellion (Geraldine)
- 1593–1603 - Tyrone's Rebellion (Nine Years' War)
- 1596 - Oxfordshire Rebellion
- 1601 - Essex Rebellion
