= Oxfordshire Rising =

Oxfordshire Rising may refer to:

- Buckinghamshire and Oxfordshire rising of 1549
- Oxfordshire rising of 1596
