= Great Haseley =

Village in Oxfordshire, England

Coordinates: 51.714°N 1.073°W

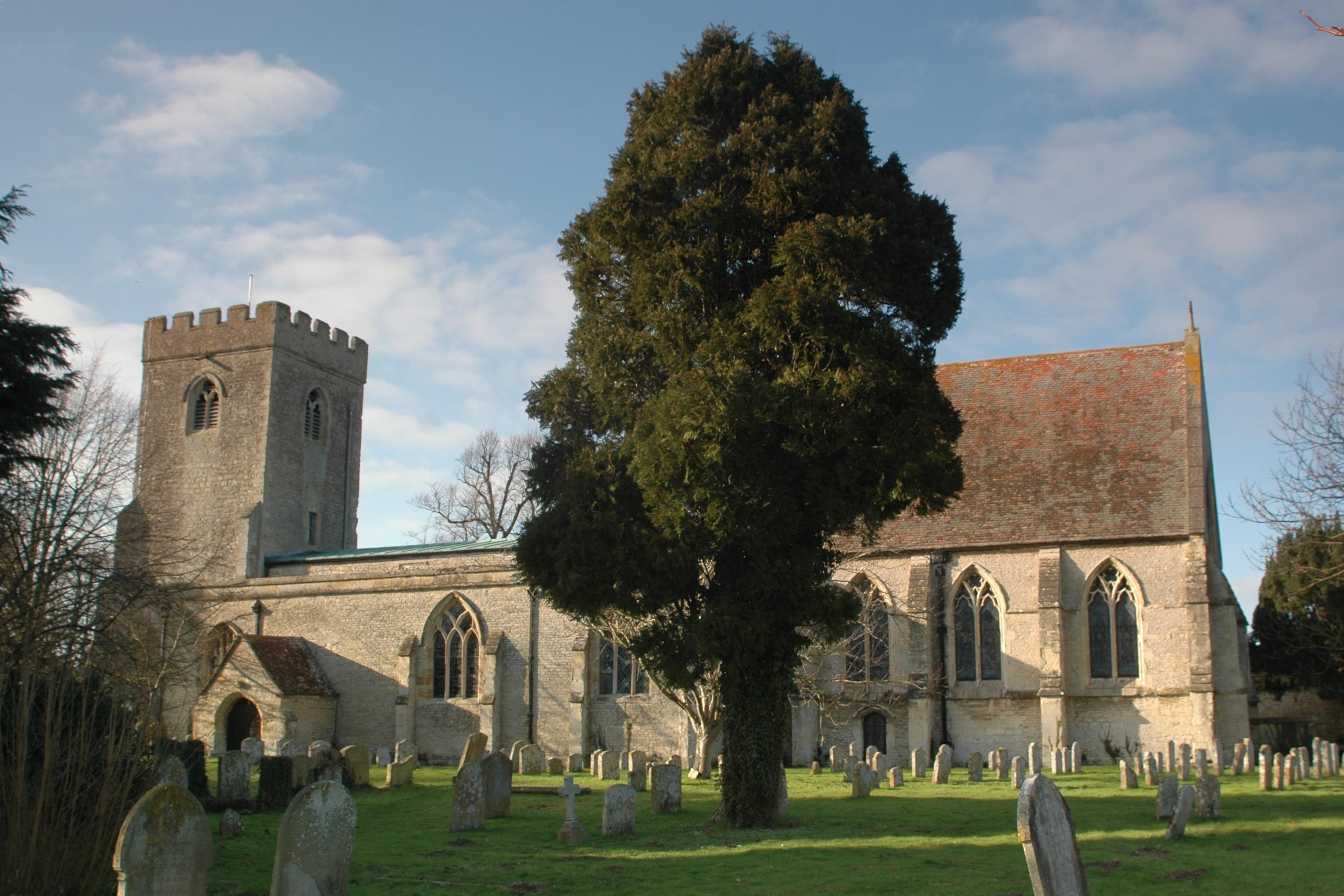
- St. Peter's parish church

- Location within Oxfordshire
- Area: 17.61 km^{2} (6.80 sq mi)
- Population: 511 (parish, including Latchford, Little Haseley, North Weston & Rycote) (2011 Census)
  - Density: 29/km^{2} (75/sq mi)
- OS grid reference: SU6401
- Civil parish: Great Haseley
- District: South Oxfordshire
- Shire county: Oxfordshire
- Region: South East
- Country: England
- Sovereign state: United Kingdom
- Post town: Oxford
- Postcode district: OX44
- Dialling code: 01844
- Police: Thames Valley
- Fire: Oxfordshire
- Ambulance: South Central
- UK Parliament: Henley and Thame
- Website: The Haseleys

Great Haseley is a village and civil parish in South Oxfordshire, England. The village is about 4.5 miles (7 km) southwest of Thame. The parish includes the hamlets of Latchford, Little Haseley and North Weston and the house, chapel and park of Rycote. The parish stretches 6 miles (10 km) along a northeast — southwest axis, bounded by the River Thame in the north, Haseley Brook in the south and partly by a boundary hedge with Little Milton parish in the west. The 2011 Census recorded a parish population of 511.

== Manor ==
The Domesday Book of 1086 records that a Norman nobleman, Miles Crispin of Wallingford, held the manor of Great Haseley. In the 13th century the manor was held by Roger Bigod, 2nd Earl of Norfolk. In 1332 Edward III granted Great Haseley to William de Bohun, 1st Earl of Northampton.

In 1482, Edward IV granted the manor to the dean and canons of St George's Chapel, Windsor Castle. The present Manor House was built in the 17th century, altered in about 1700 and has a Georgian stable block. It is a Grade II* listed building.

== Parish church ==
The Church of England parish church of Saint Peter dates from about 1200. The three-bay arcades linking the nave with the north and south aisles are in a Transitional style from Norman to Early English Gothic, as is an external doorway that has been re-set on the west side of the bell-tower. The chancel and its arch were built late in the 13th century, and it retains all of its Decorated Gothic windows from that time. In the 14th century each aisle was extended eastwards with a fourth bay, and at the end of each aisle is a chapel with a squint into the chancel. The northeast chapel is Perpendicular Gothic, as are the bell-tower and the clerestory that was added to the nave. The Gothic Revival architect Thomas Garner restored the chancel in 1897. St Peter's is a Grade I listed building.

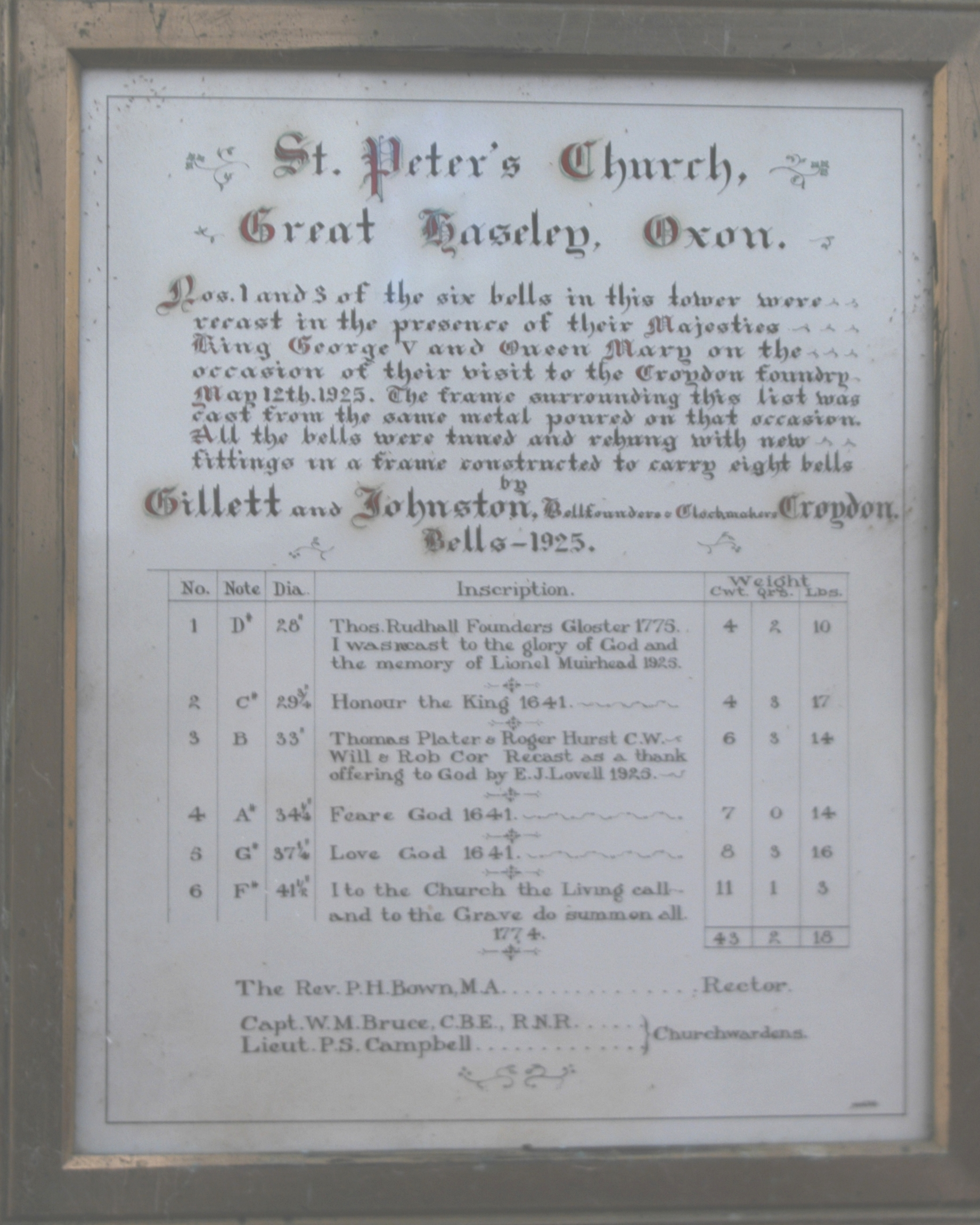
St Peter's parish church: framed record of the church's six bells

The tower has a ring of six bells. Four of them — the present third, fourth, fifth and tenor bells — existed by 1552. In 1641, Ellis I Knight of Reading recast what are now the fourth and fifth bells and cast a new bell (now the second bell), increasing the ring to five. Late in the 1690s William and Robert Cor of Aldbourne, Wiltshire recast what is now the third bell. Thomas Rudhall of Gloucester recast the tenor bell in 1774 and cast a new treble bell in 1775, increasing the ring to six. In 1925, Gillett & Johnston of Croydon re-cast the treble and the third bells, an event watched by King George V and Queen Mary. Also in 1925 all six were re-hung in a new iron frame, which has capacity for the ring to be increased to eight.

St Peter's had a church clock by 1666, when it is first mentioned in the churchwardens' accounts. It was replaced by a new clock in 1759 or 1760. This in turn was replaced by the present clock, which was installed in 1865. The churchyard contains one war grave from World War II, of Lieutenant-Colonel Anthony Muirhead, the first British Member of Parliament to die serving in the war. St Peter's parish is now part of a single benefice with the parishes of Great Milton and Little Milton.

== Economic and social history ==
Great Haseley tithe barn was built in 1313. It is a stone building, buttressed on all sides, and originally had a cruck frame of nine bays. At that stage it would have been about 125 feet (38 m) long and 30 feet (9 m) wide. In 1485–86, repairs to the roof were attempted but were unsuccessful. In 1495–96, the three most easterly bays of the barn were demolished and rebuilt as an arcaded structure with queen struts and curved wind braces. In 1811, the three most westerly bays collapsed and were not rebuilt. The accident damaged the next two bays but these were repaired with the addition of arcade posts. The barn is a Grade I listed building.

The Old Rectory was built in the 14th or 15th century. It was rebuilt in 1846 but retains a 14th-century window, a 15th-century window and its 15th-century hall. It is a Grade II* listed building. "Crucks" is a cottage in Rectory Road with a two-bay cruck frame dating from the 16th century or earlier, and a large chimney stack that was added probably in the 17th century. The house was extended in the 20th century but its original structure remains virtually intact.

=== July 1549 rising ===
There was a major anti-enclosure riot at Great Haseley in July 1549: part of widespread discontent across southern England prompted by enclosures, a growing rural economic crisis and new Protestant church liturgy introduced at Whitsun that year. Many of the enclosure rioters had been misled by proclamations issued by the Lord Somerset, Lord Protector, to believe they were acting lawfully in breaking illegal enclosures. The ringleader of the rioters seems to have been Thomas Bouldry, a prosperous farmer who was the lessee of the demesne farm at Great Haseley. A group of men attacked the recently enclosed deer park of Sir John Williams at Rycote before breaking into the house and refreshing themselves with his wine and beer.

The disturbance at Great Haseley seems to have become part of a wider rising across north Oxfordshire and Buckinghamshire, which was put down with great brutality in mid-July after the rebels were confronted by a force of 1,500 soldiers, probably at or near Enslow Hill. Several parish priests and other ringleaders were executed for their involvement, including Bouldry, who was hanged, drawn and quartered at Oxford.

=== School ===
A school for the boys of the village was founded in 1600, enlarged in the 18th century and rebuilt in 1902.

=== Clockmaker ===
Great Haseley had a clockmaker in the 18th century. Thomas Holloway's dates of birth and death are unknown but he repaired the turret clock in St Peter's church from 1736 until 1761. Holloway either retired or died in 1764, and his business was taken over by Thomas Stockford. There is no subsequent history of Stockford working in Great Haseley, but a Thomas Stockford traded in Thame from 1778–85.

=== Windmill ===
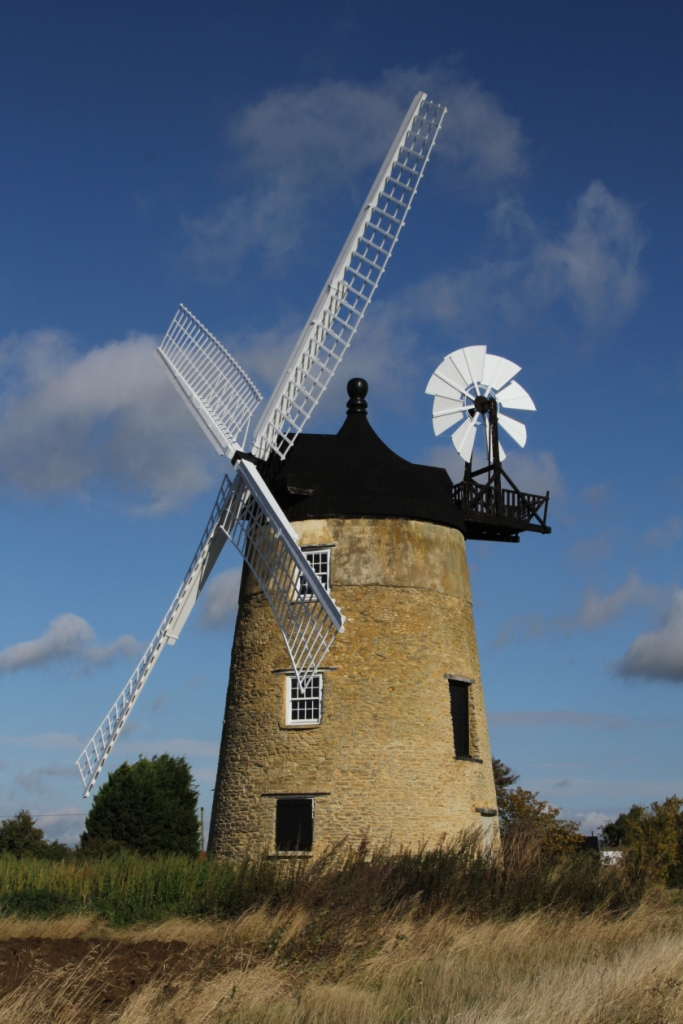
Great Haseley tower mill

There is a tower mill about 600 yards (550 m) north of the village. It was built in 1760 but has a datestone giving the year 1806, probably referring to repairs or rebuilding work. It has four common sails and a fantail. It was modernised with some iron fittings in 1889, and seems to have ceased work early in the 20th century. In about 1940 an amateur carpenter, a Mr Wood of Great Milton, started renting the mill from Lt-Col Muirhead for five shillings a year. Wood and his son conserved the mill by keeping the building weatherproof and repairing the machinery. In 1959 Wood's son, the engineer Sir Martin Wood, bought the mill, took over the project and in the 1970s undertook more maintenance and repairs. In 2005 Sir Martin transferred ownership to the newly formed Great Haseley Windmill Trust, which has since continued the restoration. The cap (i.e. roof) has been restored and in June 2014 the Trust fitted new common sails and fantail, completing the external part of the mill's restoration.

=== Notable people ===
The village is the birthplace of Alfred St. George Hamersley, a 19th-century barrister, English MP and English rugby union player who played in the first ever international match, went on to captain his country and pioneered the sport in the south of New Zealand and in British Columbia.

== Amenities ==
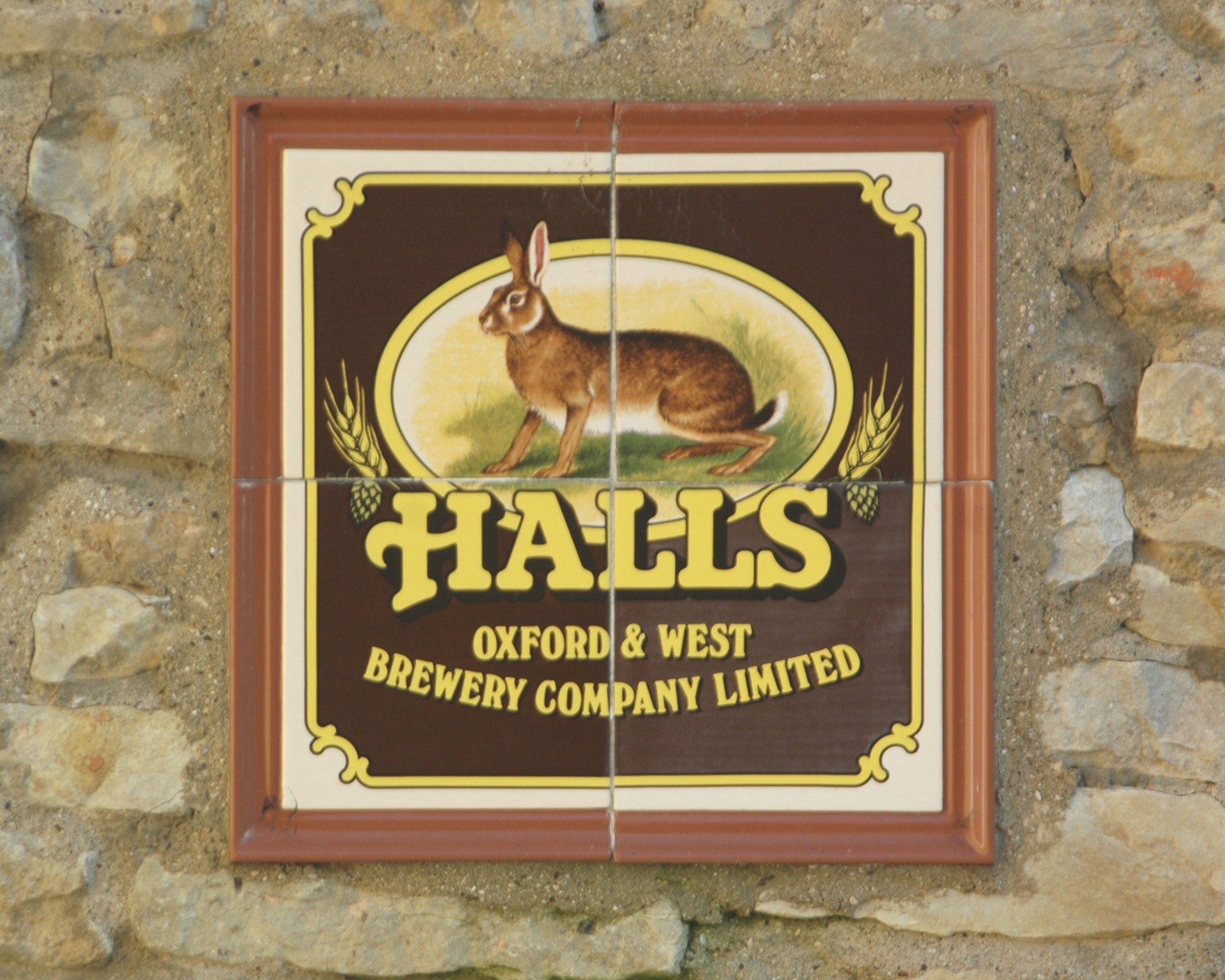
The Plough Inn: tiled plaque of the now-defunct Halls Brewery

Great Haseley has one public house, the Plough. A pub is said to have been recorded on this site since the 16th century. The present coursed rubblestone building was completed in two phases in the 18th century, and has a thatched roof. There is an Aunt Sally pitch in its garden.

== Sources ==
- Beeson, C.F.C. (1989) [1962]. Simcock, A.V. (ed.). Clockmaking in Oxfordshire 1400–1850 (3rd ed.). Oxford: Museum of the History of Science. pp. 40–41. ISBN 0-903364-06-9.
- Foreman, Wilfrid (1983). Oxfordshire Mills. Chichester: Phillimore & Co Ltd. ISBN 0-85033-441-1.
- Little, Reg (December 2013). "Wind of Change". Oxfordshire Limited Edition. Newsquest. pp. 19–21.
- Page, Mark; Peberdy, R.B. Oxfordshire: Haseley (Great and Little, with Latchford and Rycote) (In preparation - publication due in 2016). Victoria County History. Vol. XVIII. Archived from the original on 3 December 2013.
- Sherwood, Jennifer; Pevsner, Nikolaus (1974). Oxfordshire. The Buildings of England. Harmondsworth: Penguin Books. pp. 618–620. ISBN 0-14-071045-0.
- Walter, John (2010). Crowds and Popular Politics in Early Modern England. Cambridge University Press. p. 111. ISBN 978-0719082818.
- Wood, Andy (2006). The 1549 Rebellions and the Making of Early Modern England. Cambridge University Press. pp. 49–51. ISBN 0521808103.
- Woodman, A Vere (1957). "The Buckinghamshire and Oxfordshire Rising of 1549" (PDF). Oxoniensia. XXII: 78–84.
