= Jane Vigor =

English travel writer (1699–1783)

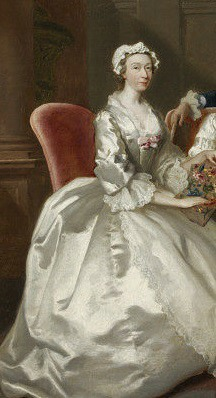
- Portrait by Joseph Highmore, 1744
- Born: Jane Goodwin; 1699; Graffham, Sussex, England
- Died: 6 September 1783 (aged 84); Windsor, Berkshire, England
- Resting place: St Nicholas churchyard, Taplow, Berkshire, England
- Occupation: Letter writer
- Spouses: Thomas Ward (m. 1718; died 1731) Claudius Rondeau (m. 1731; died 1739) William Vigor (m. 1743; died 1767)
- Children: 1
- Writing career
- Pen name: Lady Rondeau
- Language: English
- Period: 1728–1739
- Notable works: Letters from a Lady, who resided some years in Russia, to her Friend in England...

Jane Vigor (née Goodwin; other married names: Ward, Rondeau; baptised 20 February 1699 – 6 September 1783) was an English letter writer, best known for her "Letters from a Lady, who resided some years in Russia, to her Friend in England ...", written when she was the wife of two successive British residents (ambassadors) to the court of the Empress Anna of Russia. Her letters "offer a unique eyewitness account of imperial and expatriate society at Saint Petersburg" in the 1730s.

== Family and early life ==
Jane Vigor was born at Graffham in Sussex, England in early 1699, the daughter of Revd. George Goodwin and his wife, Elizabeth, née Sykes.^{a} George Goodwin was the rector of Graffham church, having been instituted as such in June 1698. Jane Goodwin was baptised at Graffham church on 20 February 1699.

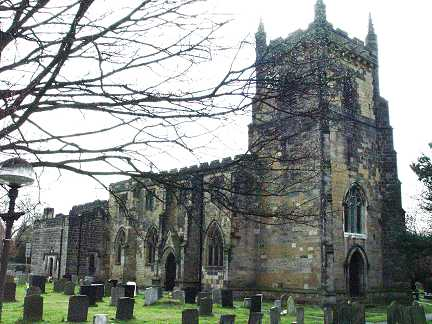
St Oswald's Church, Methley

When Jane was ten years old, George Goodwin moved to Methley in Yorkshire where he was instituted as rector of St Oswald's Church in March 1709, remaining there until his death in 1750.

On 20 November 1718, Jane Goodwin (aged 19) married Thomas Ward at Temple Church in the City of London.^{b} Ward was the son of Sir Edward Ward, the former Chief Baron of the Exchequer, and judge in the state trial of the pirate, William Kidd.

Following the death of her elder brother, Richard, in 1727, Jane inherited his share of their father's estate. George Goodwin appears to have come from a very wealthy family: writing in 1725, the Yorkshire diarist, John Hobson, describes a meeting with "Mr. Goodwin, minister of Medley (sic), who had lost £40,000 in the South Sea, and married his daughter to a Russian merchant, and had given her £14,000 to her portion".

== Life in Russia ==
Little is known about the early married life of Jane and Thomas Ward, until they arrived in St Petersburg at the end of July 1728, accompanied by his secretary Claudius Rondeau, shortly after Ward was appointed British consul-general. Ward was considered a "low-calibre" resident at the Russian court and his tenure there was short-lived, as he died suddenly in February 1731.

Following Ward's death, Rondeau applied to George Tilson, Under-Secretary for the Northern Department, for Ward's commission, to which he was appointed in September, following which he and Jane were married on 23 November 1731. Rondeau was a more effective resident than Ward, managing to reconcile the various factions within the Russia Company at St Petersburg. In the meantime, Jane took an active role in the Russian social scene, becoming a favourite of Empress Anna and attending various court parties, weddings etc.

Jane had lost a child, probably in 1737, following which she returned to London for medical attention. She became pregnant again, shortly before Rondeau died, probably from the effects of a cold, on 5 October 1739.

== Return to England ==
Following the death of Rondeau, and now pregnant, Jane decided to return to England. She set off in January 1740, taking with her a letter of recommendation from the Empress addressed to King George II:

We likewise having a particular benevolence towards the said widow for her good deserts, and consequently taking an interest in her welfare, are desirous on Our side any way to promote it; so We have found no other means than to recommend her to Your Majesty as a friend and sister to show to the said widow in her supplications your Royal Favour to her advantage and consolation in the melancholy station she is in.

— Loewenson.

Rather than attempt to travel by sea through the winter, Jane set out with her servants overland by horse-drawn sleigh; she was accompanied on her journey by William Vigor, a Quaker merchant, who was also returning to England. (Vigor was the St Petersburg agent of the Bristol-based timber, iron and steel importers, Graffin Prankard and Caleb Dickinson.) They travelled over 550 miles through the region of Livonia and the Duchy of Courland (now part of Latvia) before reaching the port of Memel (now the Lithuanian city of Klaipėda) on the Baltic Sea.

On their arrival at Memel, they found that the port was full of Prussian officers and soldiers and the only accommodation available was in a crowded inn. The following day, Vigor found better accommodation in the home of a Mr. Meyer, a business contact. The next day, Jane Rondeau and Meyer were in conversation, when they discovered that the year before, Meyer's son had been travelling in Yorkshire, England when he fell ill with smallpox. By coincidence, he was given shelter and nursed back to health in the home of Revd. Goodwin of Methley, Jane's father.

After a few days rest with Meyer and his family, Jane resumed her journey together with Vigor, travelling through Königsberg and Danzig (now Gdansk) to Hanover, where they spent a few days, before travelling on to the port of Helvoit (now Hellevoetsluis) in Holland, from where they were able to obtain a passage to England.

== Later life and death ==
Jane's daughter, Claudia Rondeau was born at Canterbury, Kent, the home town of Rondeau's family, on 8 May 1740, but she died on 31 May, only three weeks old. She was buried at St Dunstan's Church in Canterbury. Subsequently, the body of Claudius was repatriated and buried alongside his daughter.

Several other members of Claudius's family, including his parents, are also interred at St Dunstan's. Jane later had a memorial plaque erected inside St Dunstan's to commemorate her husband and daughter. Jane and William Vigor were married at the non-conformist chapel at Somerset House (in the parish of St Mary le Strand) in Westminster on 4 May 1743. The priest who officiated at the wedding was the Revd. Thomas Newcomb, who was rector at both Stopham and at Barlavington (three miles east of Jane's birthplace).

After their marriage, Jane and William Vigor lived in London until 1749, when they settled at Taplow House, near Maidenhead. Although Vigor occasionally represented the London interests of his former employers, Prankard and Dickinson, the couple settled into a life of "genteel obscurity" until William's death in October 1767. He was buried in the churchyard at St Nicholas, Taplow.

Following her husband's death, Jane Vigor moved to Windsor where she died on 6 September 1783. She was buried alongside William in Taplow churchyard.

Her obituary by John Nichols in The Gentleman's Magazine described Jane as having "lived much in the world, and being well acquainted with books, her conversation was the delight of all who had the pleasure of knowing her" and that her loss was "severely felt by the neighbouring poor, amongst whom she was constantly searching after proper objects for the exertion of her charity and benevolence".

Another English resident of St Petersburg, the governess Elizabeth Justice, described Jane as "a fine woman; very tall, and perfectly genteel", and "in all her answers, even to her inferiors, she shows the greatest condescension, and most obliging temper". The German historian, Gerhard Friedrich Müller, described her as "an Englishwoman by birth: a young, beautiful, lively, well-behaved and intelligent woman".

== Letters from a Lady... ==
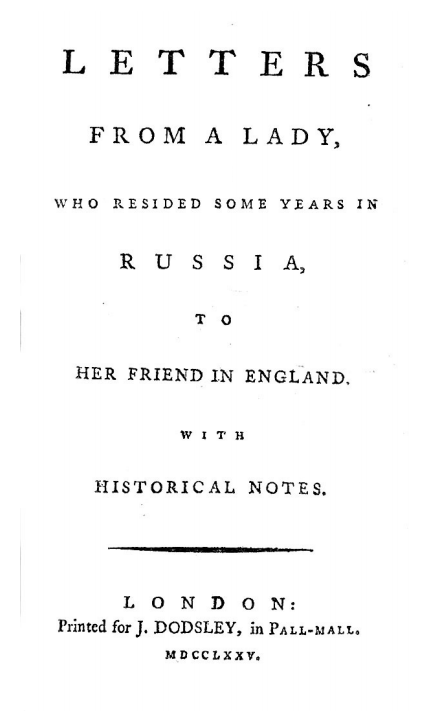

During her eleven years in St Petersburg, Jane wrote regularly to her friends and family in England. In 1775, a selection of her letters was published by James Dodsley of Pall Mall, London, under the title "Letters from a Lady, who resided some years in Russia, to her Friend in England. With historical notes". In The Gentleman‘s Magazine, John Nichols states that "she was in a manner obliged to publish, to prevent a spurious and incorrect copy from being obtruded on the world".

Despite the absence of the author's name, contemporaries soon found out that the anonymous letters had been written by Mrs Vigor. As most of the 37 letters had been written during the time she was married to Claudius Rondeau, the letters were generally referred to as "Lady Rondeau’s Letters".^{c}

The letters immediately aroused considerable interest both in England and elsewhere and were translated into German, French and Dutch by 1776. In 1777, a revised English edition was published with misprints in the original corrected. In 1836, the letters were translated into Russian; this edition was considered unsatisfactory, as it was heavily censored, and a completely revised edition was published in 1874 by Evgeny Karnovich, with additional notes by Sergey Shubinsky and an introduction by Konstantin Bestuzhev-Ryumin.

In 1784, after Jane's death the previous year, some more letters were found among her papers; these were published under the title "Eleven additional letters from Russia, in the reign of Peter II. By the late Mrs. Vigor. Never before published". The preface states that these letters were "found among her papers since her decease" and include a short biographical preface and some historical notes. These letters precede the originals chronologically and cover her earliest years at St Petersburg, during the reign of Peter II and were more personally revealing than those she had published during her lifetime.

The letters offer a unique eyewitness account of life at the court at St Petersburg and amongst the expatriate community; contemporary reviewers praised the anecdotes of courtly occasions, including marriages, coronations and funerals, as well as stories of aristocratic intrigue and romance.

== Victoria and Albert Museum ==
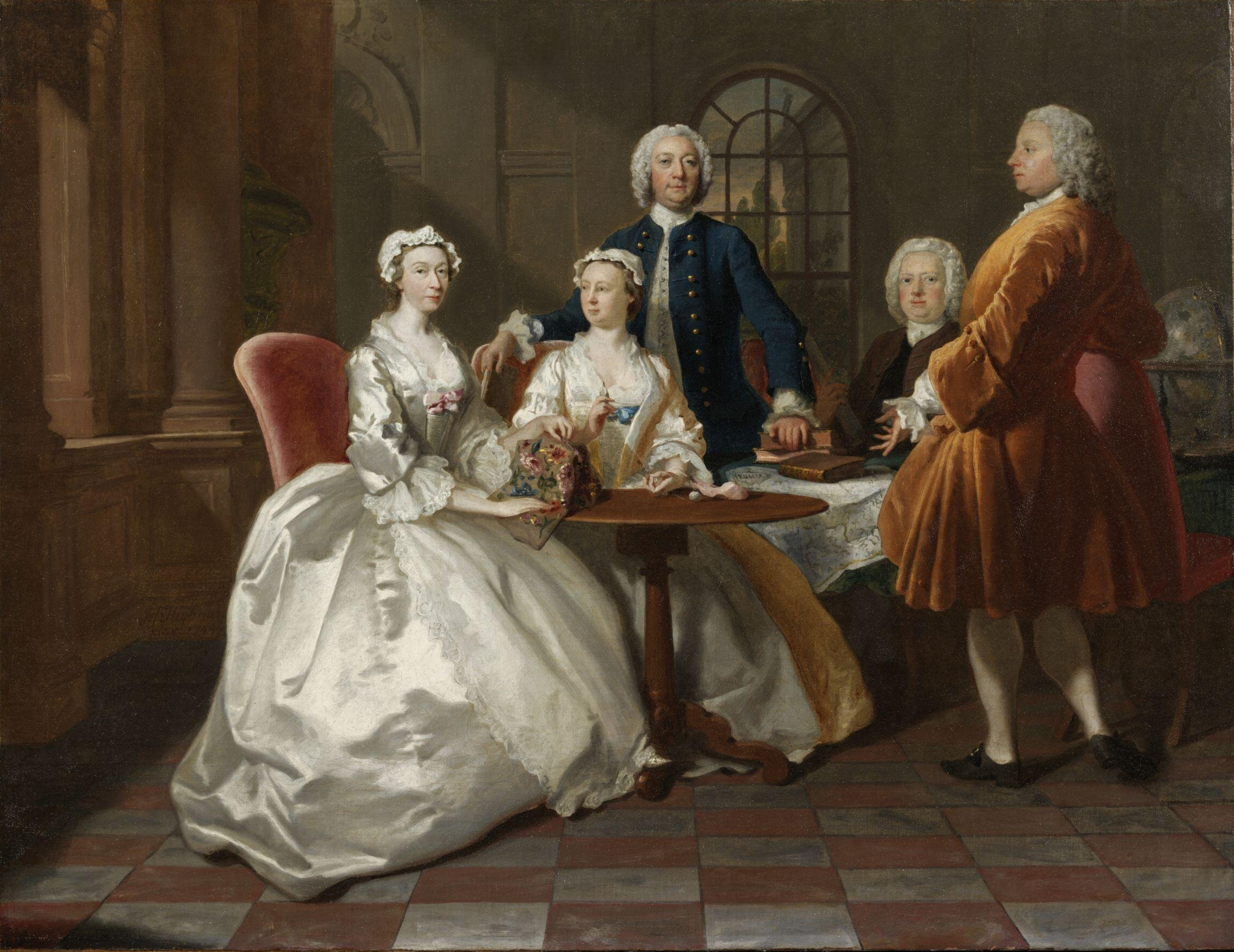
A portrait of the Vigor family by Joseph Highmore in 1744.

In 2009, London's Victoria and Albert Museum was allocated a group of twenty two embroidered sofa and chair covers together with a portrait of the Vigor family by Joseph Highmore in 1744; these had been accepted by the British Government in lieu of Inheritance Tax. The portrait, described as a "Conversation piece" shows two seated women, probably Jane and her sister-in-law, Ann, together with their husbands, William and Joseph Vigor (both standing), and a seated man, possibly John Penn (1700–1746), son of the founder of Pennsylvania, with whom the Vigors were on close terms.

In the picture, Jane is holding an example of her embroidery, while Ann is knotting silk thread with a shuttle. The seat covers were probably worked by Jane Vigor while still in St Petersburg, "adapting Russian materials to her English design and needle skills".

== Notes ==
- ^a The biography in the Oxford Dictionary of National Biography incorrectly claims that Jane was the daughter of the Revd Edward Goodwin of Rawmarsh Hall, Yorkshire, and Jane Wainwright. This claim is repeated in several other sources.
- ^b The preface to "Eleven additional letters from Russia" published in 1784, the year after Jane Vigor's death, includes some biographical notes, which state that she was married "to Thomas Ward, Esq. Consul General to Russia, 1728". This seems to refer to the date on which Ward took up his appointment in Russia, rather than the date of the marriage, which is how it has been interpreted in the ONDB article and elsewhere.
- ^c The incorrect appellation "Lady" presumably came about because of the use of the word in the full title of the publication, although Jane was always plain "Mrs".

== See also ==
- Lillie de Hegermann-Lindencrone

== Sources ==
- "Рондо, английская писательница" . Brockhaus and Efron Encyclopedic Dictionary (in Russian). 1906.
- Delany, Mary (1882). Woolsey, Sarah Chauncey (ed.). The autobiography and correspondence of Mrs. Delany. Boston: Roberts Bros.
- Loewenson, Leo (June 1957). "Lady Rondeau's Letters from Russia (1728–1739)". The Slavonic and East European Review. 35 (85): 399–408. JSTOR 4204849.
- Vigor, Mrs William (1775). Letters from a Lady, Who Resided Some Years in Russia, to Her Friend in England. Adamant Media Corporation (Elibron Classics).
- Vigor, Mrs William (1784). Eleven additional letters from Russia, ... Gale Eighteenth Century Online.
