= Francis Charles Hingeston-Randolph =

English cleric, antiquary and author

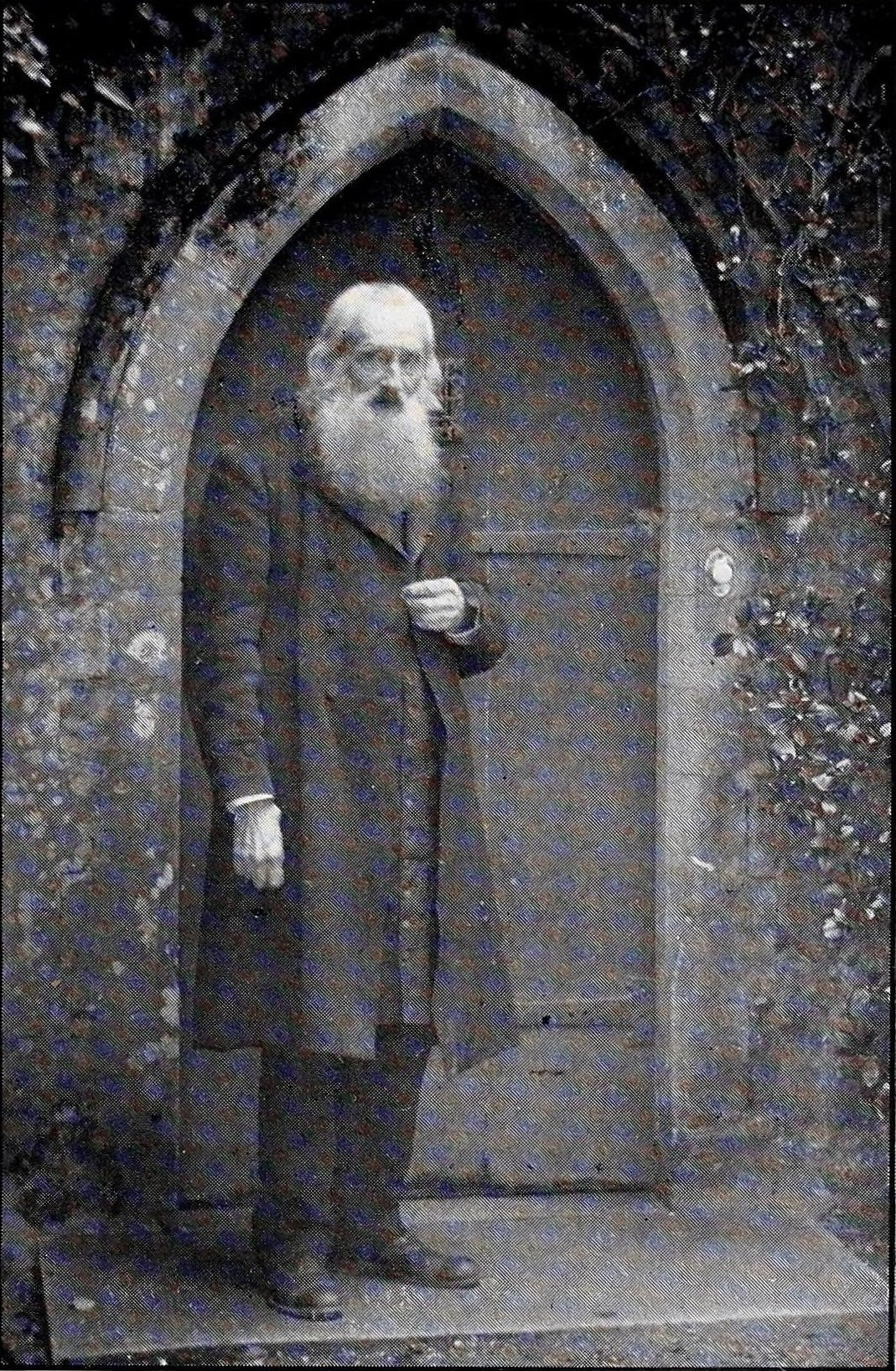
F. C. Hingeston-Randolph

Francis Charles Hingeston-Randolph, known until 1860 as Francis Hingston (1833–1910) was an English cleric, antiquary and author.

== Life ==
Francis Hingston was born at Truro on 31 March 1833, the son of Francis Hingston (1796–1841), controller of customs there, and Jane Matilda, daughter of Captain William Kirkness. Thomas Hingston was his uncle.

From Truro Grammar School, Hingston went on in 1851 to Exeter College, Oxford, as Elliott exhibitioner. He graduated B.A. in 1855 with an honorary fourth class degree in the final pass school, and proceeded M.A. in 1859. Ordained in 1856, he served as curate of Holywell, Oxfordshire, until 1858, when he moved to Hampton Gay, in the same county, succeeding to the incumbency of the parish next year. In 1860 he became rector of Ringmore, near Kingsbridge in Devon, where the patronage to the living later became vested in his family. He remained at Ringmore for the rest of his life.

For ten years (1879–90) Hingeston-Randolph was rural dean of Woodleigh. He died at Ringmore on 27 August 1910, and was buried in the churchyard there.

== Works ==
In 1857 Hingston edited the poems of his father as The Poems of Francis Hingeston, edited by his son. An early work was Specimens of Ancient Cornish Crosses and Fonts (London and Truro, 1850). Other historical publications followed, but his scholarship was called into question.

For the Rolls Series, Hingston edited John Capgrave's Chronicle (1858); Capgrave's Liber de Illustribus Henricis (1859), and Royal and Historical Letters during the Reign of Henry the Fourth, vol. i. 1399–1404 (1860). The last volume in particular was heavily criticised, and when Hingeston-Randolph (as he now was) had completed a second volume of it in 1864, collation with the original documents led to the cancelling and reprinting of sixty-two pages and the adding of sixteen pages of errata. Of each version eight copies were kept, but none was issued to the public.

In 1885 Frederick Temple, then bishop of Exeter, made Hingeston-Randolph a prebendary of Exeter Cathedral, and at the bishop's suggestion he began editing the Episcopal Registers of the diocese. Between 1886 and 1909 he completed those of eight bishops of the thirteenth, fourteenth, and fifteenth centuries (11 pts.). He mainly restricted himself to indexing the contents of the registers.

Hingeston-Randolph was often consulted about the restoration of West Country churches. He wrote Architectural History of St. Germans Church, Cornwall (1903), and contributed articles on church architecture to Building News and The Ecclesiologist. In his articles "Up and down the Deanery", which he contributed to the Salcombe Parish Magazine, he gave a historical account of every parish under his charge as rural dean. He published also Records of a Rocky Shore, by a Country Parson (1876) and The Constitution of the Cathedral Body of Exeter (1887). He was a contributor to Devon Notes and Queries, Notes and Gleanings, and Western Antiquary.

== Family ==
In the late 1850s, Hingeston courted the eldest daughter of Joseph Stevenson, the principal instigator of the Rolls Series. This probably eased his appointment as one of the first editors of the series. However, by May 1858 he had thrown her over, Stevenson describing his conduct as "base, treacherous and untruthful".

In 1860 he married Martha, only daughter of Herbert Randolph, incumbent of Melrose, Roxburghshire. At his father-in-law's wish, he then added the name of Randolph to his own and adopted Hingeston, an earlier form of the spelling of his family surname. His wife predeceased him in 1904. He left four sons and six daughters.

== Notes ==
Attribution

This article incorporates text from a publication now in the public domain: Lee, Sidney, ed. (1912). "Hingeston-Randolph, Francis Charles". Dictionary of National Biography (2nd supplement). Vol. 2. London: Smith, Elder & Co.
