= Hingston =

Hingston is a surname. Notable people with the surname include:

- Dick Hingston (born 1915), Australian footballer
- John Hingston (died 1683), composer and organist
- Richard Hingston (1887–1966), British physician, explorer and naturalist
- Seán Martin Hingston, American actor
- Thomas Hingston (died 1837), English antiquary
- William Hales Hingston, (1829–1907), Canadian physician, politician, and banker
- Dean Francis Hingston, (1977) Australian Seafarer, Food Technologist.

== See also ==
- Hingston Down, a hill in Cornwall
- Hingston & Prideaux
