= Christopher Tilson =

British Treasury official

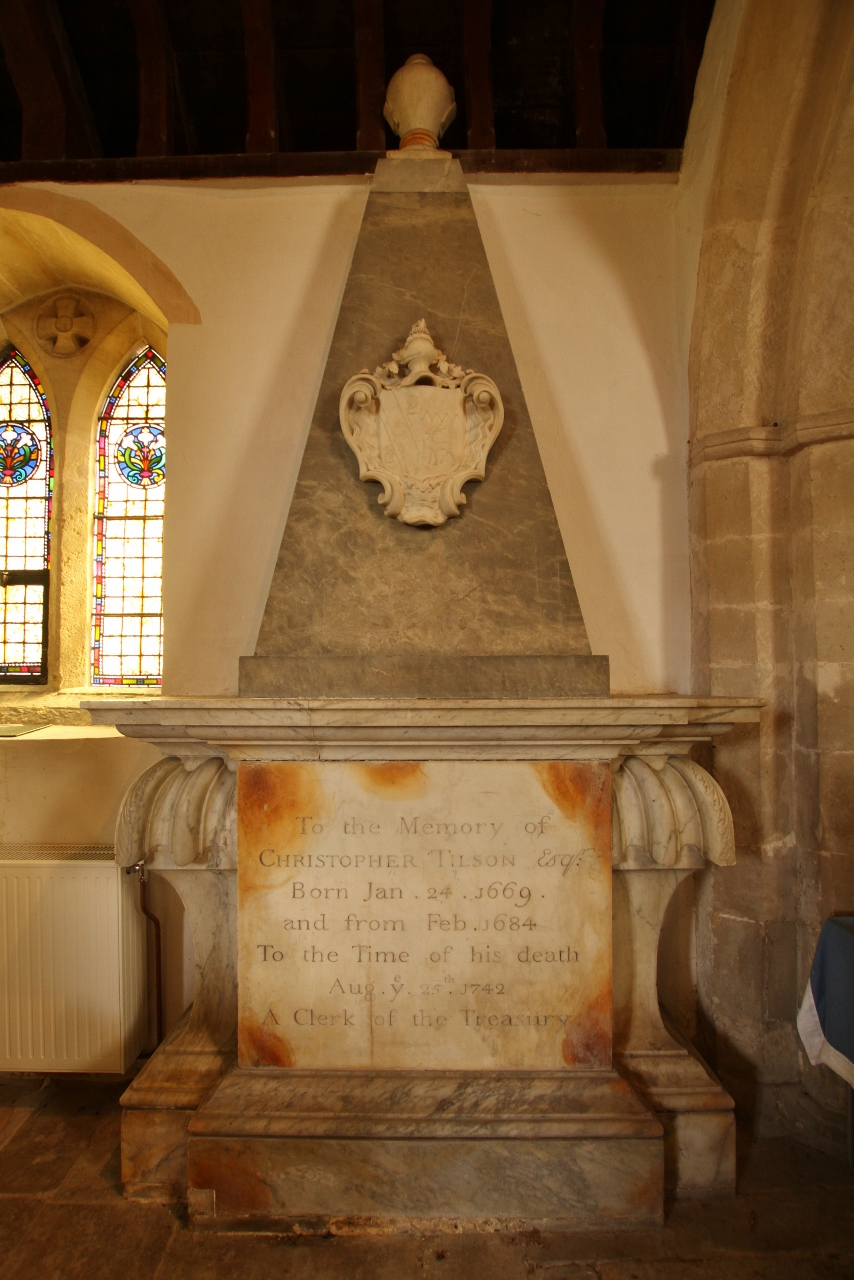
Monument to Christopher Tilson, St Mary's Church, Hampton Poyle

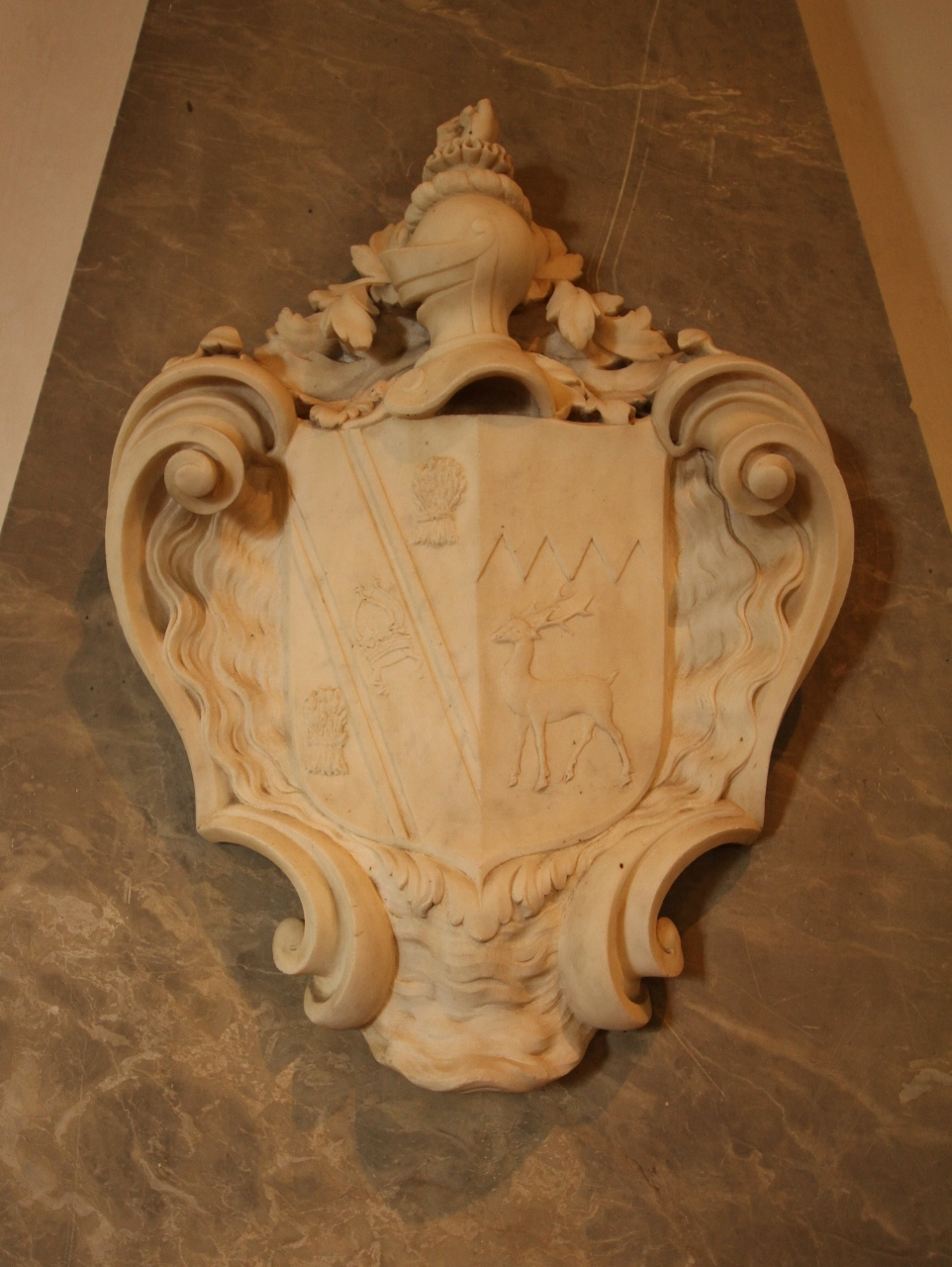
Arms of Christopher Tilson on his monument in St Mary's Church, Hampton Poyle: Or, on a bend plain cotised between two garbs azure a mitre of the field (Tilson) impaling Sable a buck trippant or a chief indented of the second (Humble)

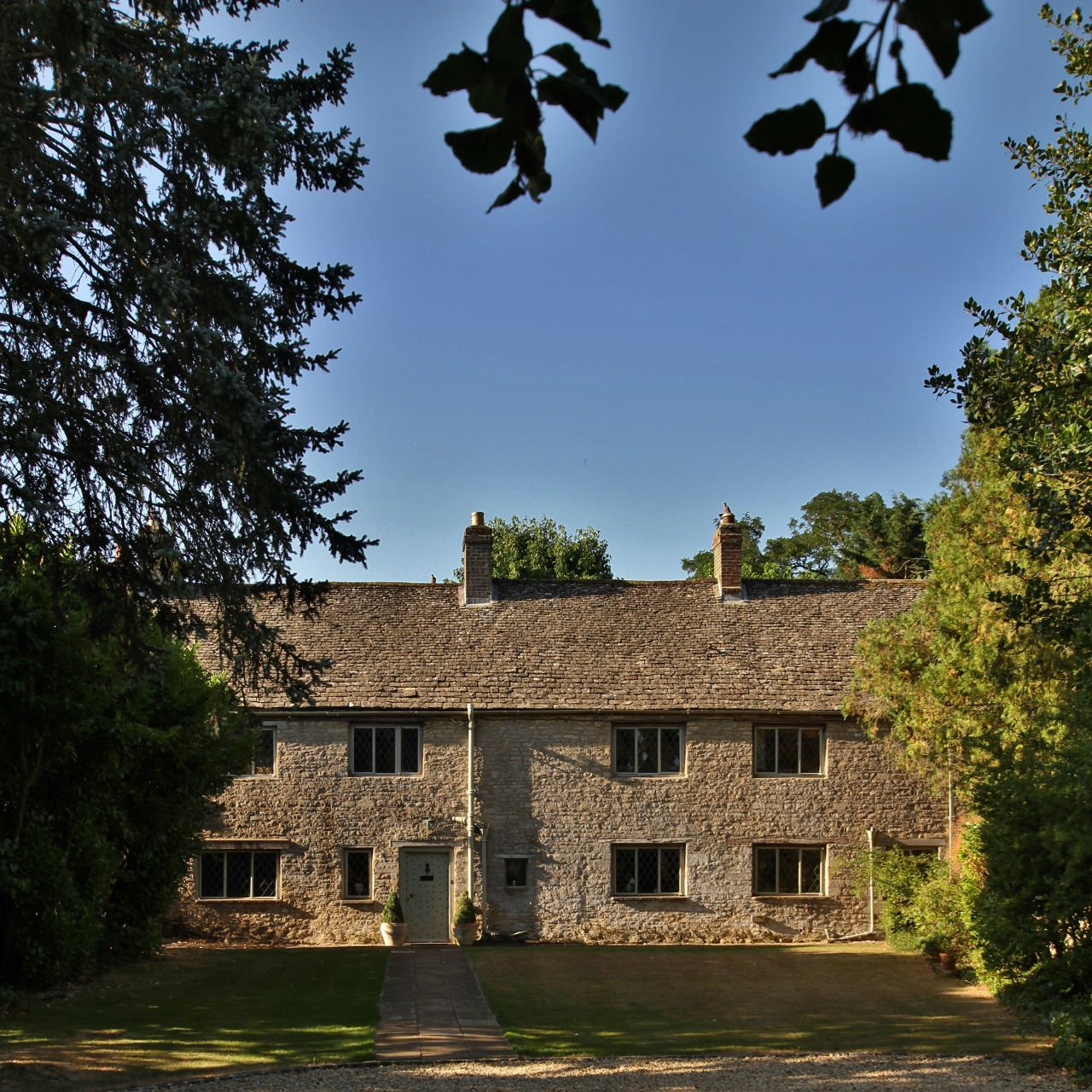
Hampton Poyle Old Manor House, built in the 17th century

Christopher Tilson (24 January 1670 – 25 August 1742) of St Margaret's, Westminster and Hampton Poyle, Oxfordshire, was a British Treasury official for over 50 years and a politician who sat in the House of Commons from 1727 to 1734.

Tilson was the son of Nathaniel Tilson of London, and grandson of Henry Tilson, Bishop of Elphin in Ireland. He was educated at St Paul's School. In February 1685 he became Clerk of the Treasury, a post he held for the rest of his life. He became Clerk of Commissioner of appeal in the excise at £100 p.a. in April 1693, and Receiver General of crown land revenues in 1699. Before 1706, he married Mary Humble (died 30 August 1737), daughter of George Humble. He acquired the manor of Hampton Poyle in 1723.

Tilson's brother was George Tilson, under-secretary of state for the northern department from 1710 to 1738. At the 1727 British general election, Tilson was returned as Member of Parliament for Cricklade. He voted with the Administration, but did not stand again at the 1734 British general election. He was chosen as a director of the Chelsea Waterworks Company in 1730 and was its deputy governor in 1733.

Tilson was questioned on 30 June 1742 by the secret committee of the House of Commons about the expenditure on the secret service during Walpole's tenure at the Treasury. He replied that it was all without account, . . . nor is there any entry in the Treasury of the application of any of these sums of money. Horace Walpole wrote that ‘old Tilson ... was so much tormented’ by the secret committee on Walpole that ‘it turned his brain'.

Tilson died on 25 August 1742.

Parliament of Great Britain
Preceded by Sir Thomas Reade; Thomas Gore	Member of Parliament for Cricklade; 1727–1734; With: Sir Thomas Reade	Succeeded by Sir Thomas Reade; William Gore
