= Hampton Gay and Poyle =

Coordinates: 51.837°N 1.271°W

- Civil parish
- Location within Oxfordshire
- Civil parish: Hampton Gay and Poyle
- District: Cherwell
- Shire county: Oxfordshire
- Region: South East
- Country: England
- Sovereign state: United Kingdom
- Post town: Kidlington
- Postcode district: OX5
- Dialling code: 01865
- Police: Thames Valley
- Fire: Oxfordshire
- Ambulance: South Central
- UK Parliament: Bicester and Woodstock

Hampton Gay and Poyle is a civil parish in Oxfordshire, England. It was formed in 1932 by merger of the parishes of Hampton Gay (grid reference SP4816) and Hampton Poyle (grid reference SP5015) and as at 2011 had 141 residents across 6.11 km^{2}

== Sources ==
- Lobel, Mary D., ed. (1959). A History of the County of Oxford. Victoria County History. Vol. 6. pp. 152–168.
