= Hampton (place name) =

Old English place name

The place name Hampton is of Old English origin and is common in England, particularly in the South of England and Central England. It can exist as a name in its own right or as a prefix or suffix. The name suggests a farm settlement, especially one where pastoral farmers keep livestock on flood-meadow pastures.

The name was exported around the world both as a place-name and as a surname, especially to those countries where the English language is an official language. Examples of place-names include:

- Hampton – Australia
- Hampton – Canada
- Hampton – United States

== Etymology ==
The English toponymist P. H. Reaney has suggested that the name element Hampton may derive from:

1. Old English hām + tūn – "village with a home farm". (Note: Chapter Two PLACE-NAME STUDY (P H Reaney). . .Examples of Hampton from Old English hām and tūn – "village with a home farm": Hampton, Oxfordshire; Hampton, Gloucestershire; Hampton Lovett, Worcestershire. . .) (Note: WiKtionary : Old English < hām >: 1. " home ".; 2. " property, estate, farm ".; 3. " village; community ".) (Note: WiKtionary : Old English < tun >: 1. " an enclosed piece of ground "; 2. " a village or town ")
2. Old English hamm + tūn – "village with a flood-meadow or pasture". (Note: Chapter Two PLACE-NAME STUDY (P H Reaney). . .Examples of Hampton from Old English hamm and tūn: Hampton, London, Middlesex; Hampton, Herefordshire; Hampton Lucy, Warwickshire. . .) (Note: WiKtionary: Old English < hamm >: 1. " enclosure, piece of enclosed land (especially land enclosed by a river) ".) (Note: Dictionary – Old English ( Clark Hall ) < hamm >: 1. " piece of pasture land "; 2. " enclosure "; 3. " dwelling ".)

The English toponymist Victor Watts has suggested the following possibilities:

1. Old English hēah + tūn – "high settlement" (Note: The settlement may be on high ground beside a flood meadow.)
2. Old English hamm + tūn:
  1. "settlement or estate in a river bend".
  2. "settlement or estate between rivers".
3. Old English hām + tūn – "home farm".

=== Examples (home farm) ===
Examples of Old English hām and tūn – "village with a home farm":

Place name	Location	OS Grid	Historic landowner	Home farm	Listed	River name
Hampton Gay	Oxfordshire	SP4816	Robert de Gay	Manor Farm	Grade II	River Cherwell (Note: Manor Farm is beside a flood-meadow of the River Cherwell.)
Hampton Poyle	Oxfordshire	SP5015	Walter de la Poyle (Note: English Place-Names (Victor Watts) < Hampton Poyle > ( hām + tūn ). . .“held by the Poyle family. . .)	Manor Farm (Note: Manor Farm is at the end of Church lane west of the church.) (Note: See Hampton Poyle > social history > . . .parish church and Manor Farm.)		River Cherwell (Note: Manor Farm is beside a flood-meadow of the River Cherwell.)
Hampton Lovett	Worcestershire	SO8865	Lovet family (Note: English Place-Names (Victor Watts) < Hampton Lovett > ( hām + tūn ). . .“belonging to the Lovet family. . .)	Hampton Farm (Note: Hampton Farmhouse is on high ground north-east of the railway line.)	Grade II	Elmbridge Brook

=== Examples (meadow) ===
Examples of Old English hamm and tūn – "village with a flood-meadow or pasture":

Place name	Location	OS Grid	Derivation
Hampton	Richmond upon Thames	TQ1370	River Thames (Note: English Place-Names (Victor Watts) < Hampton > ( hamm + tūn ) . . ."The reference is to a great bend of the River Thames . . .) (Note: The derivation suggests that Hampton was originally a farm settlement where pastoral farmers kept livestock on the flood-meadow beside the River Thames.)
Hampton Lucy	Warwickshire	SP2557	River Avon (Note: English Place-Names (Victor Watts) < Hampton Lucy > ( hamm + tūn ). . ."held by the Lucy family. . .It lies in a large bend of the River Avon. . .) (Note: The village is near an island created by a bifurcation of the River Avon.)

=== Examples (high settlement) ===
Examples of Old English hēah and tūn – "high settlement":

Place name	Location	OS Grid	Derivation	River name
Hampton	Evesham, Worcestershire	SP0243	High ground (Note: English Place-Names (Victor Watts) < Hampton > ( hēah + tūn ) . . . "The village occupies raised ground between Merry Brook and the River Isbourne. . .)	River Isbourne – River Avon (Note: The settlement is near the confluence of the rivers Isbourne and Avon.)
Hampton in Arden	Solihull, West Midlands	SP2081	High ground (Note: English Place-Names (Victor Watts) < Hampton in Arden > ( hēah + tūn ) "The village occupies a plateau of high ground")	River Blythe (Note: The settlement is near an island created by a bifurcation of the River Blythe.)

== Examples in England ==
=== Hampton ===
- Hampton, Peterborough, Cambridgeshire
- Hampton, Cheshire
- Hampton, Herne Bay, Kent
- Hampton, London Borough of Richmond upon Thames
- Hampton-on-the-Hill, Warwickshire
- Hampton in Arden, Solihull, West Midlands
- Hampton, Worcestershire

=== Hampton (prefix) ===
Examples of Hampton followed by a name, usually of a landowner:

- Hampton Gay, Oxfordshire
- Hampton Poyle, Oxfordshire
- Hampton Loade, Shropshire
- Hampton Lucy, Warwickshire
- Hampton Lovett, Worcestershire

=== Hampton (suffix) ===
- Bothenhampton, Dorset
- Littlehampton, West Sussex
- Northampton, Northamptonshire
- Southampton, Hampshire
- Sevenhampton, Gloucestershire
- Sevenhampton, Wiltshire
- Wolverhampton, West Midlands
