= Lillie de Hegermann-Lindencrone =

American diplomat (1844–1928)

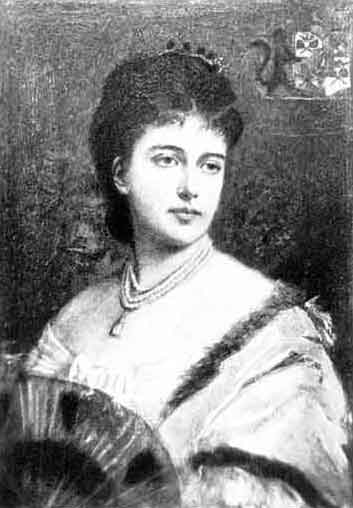
Portrait of Lillie De Hegermann-Lindencrone, circa 1880

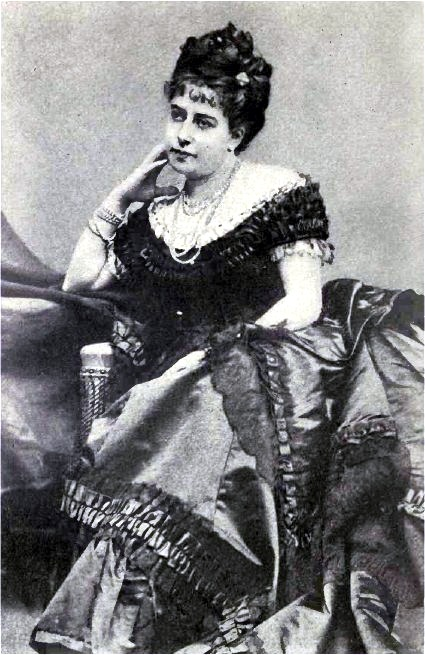
Lillie De Hegermann-Lindencrone

Lillie De Hegermann-Lindencrone (1844–1928), born Lillie Greenough in Cambridge, Massachusetts and later known as Lillie Moulton, was a trained singer, and latterly a diplomat's wife noted for publishing in 1913 a book of letters describing The Sunny Side of Diplomatic Life.

As a child she developed the remarkable voice which later was to make her well known, and when only fifteen years of age her mother took her to London to study under Manuel Garcia. Two years later she became the wife of Charles Moulton, the son of a well-known American banker, who had been a resident in Paris since the days of Louis Philippe. As Madame Charles Moulton she became an appreciated guest at the court of Napoleon III. Upon his fall, in circa 1870, she returned to the United States, where Mr. Moulton died, and a few years afterward she married M. Johan de Hegermann-Lindencrone, at that time Danish Minister to the United States, and in later periods his country's representative at Stockholm, Rome, Paris, Washington and Berlin. She died on 17 March 1928 in Copenhagen, where she is buried in the Garrison Cemetery.

She was, by her own description, a friend and favourite of a number of contemporary royal houses, being intimate with Christian IX of Denmark and his queen Louise of Hesse-Kassel (or Hesse-Cassel); Umberto I of Italy and his queen Margherita of Savoy, Oscar II of Sweden and his queen Sofia of Nassau; and the many offspring and relations of these families. She was also acquainted with many of the famous composers of her day, including Richard Wagner, Franz Liszt, and Gioacchino Rossini.

Her book, The Sunny Side of Diplomatic Life, provides an insight into the etiquette of European court life in the last years of the 19th century and the first years of the 20th century, as seen through the prism of a serving diplomat, friend and confidante of European royalty.

Several publications documenting her career as a singer were released, including one by Samuel Frizzell.

== See also ==
- Jane Vigor

== Bibliography ==
- de Hegermann-Lindencrone, Lillie (1914). The Sunny Side of Diplomatic Life, 1875-1912. New York and London, Harper & brothers. OCLC: 23326254.
- de Hegermann-Lindencrone, Lillie (1980) [1912]. In the courts of memory : musical and social life during the Second Empire in Paris, from contemporary letters. Da Capo Press. ISBN 0-306-76012-6.
- Frizzell, Samuel S. (1871). The favorite songs of Mrs. Charles Moulton as sung by her at her concerts in America. New York: Wm. A. Pond & Co. OCLC: 57748583.
- Pease, Alfred H.; de Hegermann-Lindencrone, Lillie (1874). Sleep! baby sleep! : cradle song, words from the German. New York (547 Broadway & 39 Union Squiare, New York) : Wm. A. Pond & Co. OCLC: 34233735.
- de Laurière, Y. H. (1938). Une Américaine à la cour de Napoléon III. Paris: Calmann-Lévy. OCLC: 2772251.
