= George Tilson =

British civil servant (c. 1672 – 1738)

George Tilson (c. 1672 – 17 November 1738) was a British civil servant, long-serving Under-Secretary of State in the Foreign Office.

Tilson was the son of Nathaniel Tilson of London, and grandson of Henry Tilson, Bishop of Elphin. From 1703 to 1706 he was Secretary to the British envoy to Prussia, Baron Raby. From 1710 until his death in 1738 he was Under-Secretary for the Northern Department, serving under a succession of Tory and Whig Secretaries of State: Bolingbroke, William Bromley, Townshend, James Stanhope, 1st Earl Stanhope, Sunderland and Lord Carteret. As Thomas Carlyle put it, Tilson's name "often turns up [...] in the [...] extinct Paper-heaps of that time". Tilson's brother Christopher was a long-serving treasury official and MP for Cricklade from 1727 to 1734.

Tilson was elected a Fellow of the Royal Society in May 1735.
