= James Webbe =

English politician

James Webbe (by 1528 – 1557), of Devizes, Wiltshire, was an English politician.

He was a member (MP) of the parliament of England for Devizes in 1555.
