= Bartholomew Steer =

Bartholomew Steer (baptised 1568, died 1597) led the unsuccessful Oxfordshire Rising of 1596. He was a carpenter, born in Hampton Poyle, Oxfordshire, brother to a weaver. In 1596 the area was suffering through famine and increasing poverty. The weavers and carders were severely affected by enclosure laws, and Steer, although he claimed upon his arrest that he was free and not in any want, lived in the midst of a great deal of suffering.

He was well aware of the history of rebellion in Oxfordshire, and he agitated his fellow workers to rebel against the enclosures. John Walter says that Steer "preached the politics of Cockayne" to hungry people. The goal of the uprising Steer organized was to tear down the fences and then to attack the landlords who maintained the enclosures, the law officers who enforced the enclosure act, and then to march with the people down to London, where the disaffected apprentices would join with them to demand change. There would be, he said, common ownership and access at that time.

In November 1596, Steer and four other men met and waited for the crowd to join them, but it failed to materialize. They were soon arrested, and Steer was put in Newgate Prison, where he was interrogated by Sir Edward Coke. The royal authorities were very concerned with this suspect rebellion, and Coke authorized the use of torture on Steer. The confession of the plans to murder came from torture, as Steer's initial plans were probably only to tear down the turnstiles and march. When the group went to trial in June 1597, Steer was not present. Given the defiance of his testimony, even that delivered under torture, it is almost certain that he was dead, either of his ordeal or prison conditions, by that point.

The Elizabethan government also recognised the cause of the rebels' grievance and determined that "order should be taken about inclosures...that the poor may be able to live". Parliament duly passed an Act (39 Eliz. 1 c. 2) to restore to arable use all lands that had been converted to pasture since the accession of Elizabeth I in 1558.

Although Steer's rebellion never occurred, the reaction to its rumour and attempt was out of proportion. Historians have since gravitated toward his account as an illustration of populist resentment against enclosure and material conditions in late feudalism.

== Sources ==
- Lobel, Mary D, ed. (1959). "Hampton Gay". A History of the County of Oxford. Victoria County History. Vol. 6. pp. 152–159.
- Walter, John (2004). "Bartholomew Steer". In Matthew, Colin; Harrison, Brian (eds.). The Oxford Dictionary of National Biography. Vol. 52. London: Oxford University Press. pp. 371–372.
