= Hampton Gay =

Village in Oxfordshire, England

Coordinates: 51.848°N 01.303°W

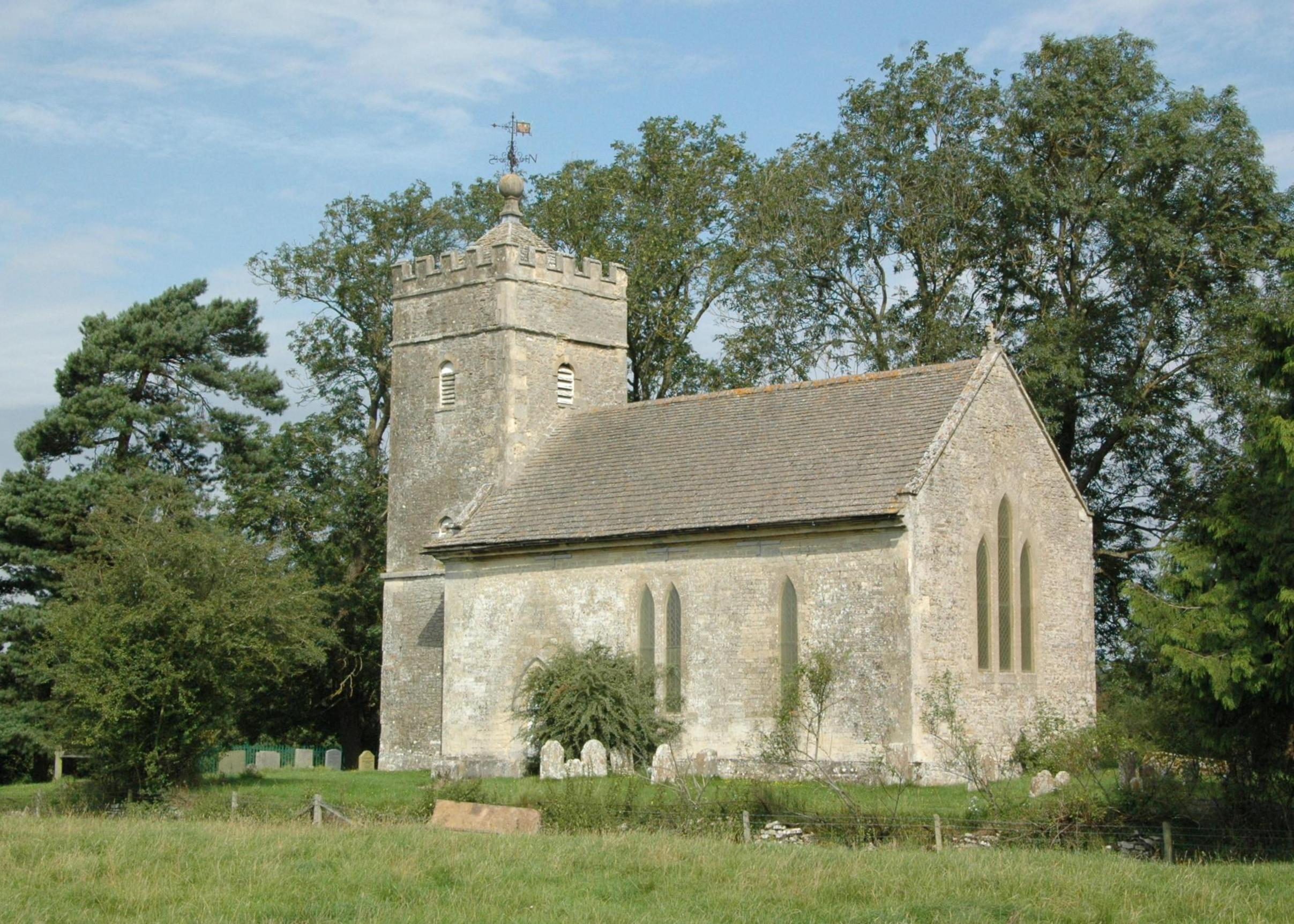
- St. Giles' parish church

- Location within Oxfordshire
- OS grid reference: SP4816
- Civil parish: Hampton Gay and Poyle
- District: Cherwell
- Shire county: Oxfordshire
- Region: South East
- Country: England
- Sovereign state: United Kingdom
- Post town: Kidlington
- Postcode district: OX5
- Dialling code: 01865
- Police: Thames Valley
- Fire: Oxfordshire
- Ambulance: South Central
- UK Parliament: Banbury
- Website: Hampton Gay and Poyle Community Website

Hampton Gay is a village in the civil parish of Hampton Gay and Poyle, in the Cherwell district, in the county of Oxfordshire, England. It is in the Cherwell Valley about 1.5 miles (2.4 km) north of Kidlington. In 1931 the parish had a population of 28. On 1 April 1932 the parish was abolished to form "Hampton Gay and Poyle".

== Name ==
In this instance the name Hampton derives from Old English hām and tūn – "village with a home farm". (Note: See Hampton (place name) > Etymology) The name Gay derives from the de Gay family. (Note: River Cherwell (Jean Stone). . . " Robert de Gay was one of Hampton Gay's first twelfth-century landlords, and in the thirteenth century, Walter de la Poyle gave his name to the other Hampton. . .)

The toponym for Hampton Gay might be:

- Home farm of the "de Gay" manor.
- Village of the "de Gay" Manor Farm.

== Archaeology ==
In 1972 a cast bronze clasp was found at Hampton Gay near St Giles' parish church. It is decorated with stylised Acanthus leaves and may be late Saxon, from the 10th or 11th century.

== Manor ==
After the Norman Conquest of England Robert D'Oyly gave an estate of three hides at Hampton Gay to his brother in arms Roger d'Ivry, while a second estate of two hides at Hampton Gay belonged to the Crown. D'Ivry's holding became part of the Honour of St. Valery, which in the 13th century was owned by Richard of Cornwall. Under his successor Edmund, 2nd Earl of Cornwall towards the end of the 13th century the d'Ivry holding was merged with the Duchy of Cornwall. The royal estate at Hampton Gay became part of the honour of Gloucester and thereby followed the same descent as the manor of Finmere. The Domesday Book of 1086 records that one Rainald was the tenant of both the d'Ivry and the royal estate. The de Gay family were tenants of both estates by about 1137 and remained so until 1222. Hampton Gay's toponym combines their surname with the Old English for a village or farm.

In about 1170 Reginald de Gay gave a virgate of land (about 30 acres (12 ha)) to the house of the Knights Templar at Cowley, Oxfordshire. In about 1311 the Templars were suppressed and their holding at Hampton Gay was transferred to the Knights Hospitaller of Saint John of Jerusalem. In about 1218 Robert de Gay gave the tenancy of half a hide of the St. Valery estate to the Benedictine convent at Godstow. Between 1195 and 1205 the Augustinian Abbey of Osney bought the tenancy of two virgates at Hampton Gay from Robert de Gay, who in stages from 1210 to 1222 gave the remainder of his tenancy to the abbey. The three religious orders retained their estates at Hampton Gay until 1539, when they were suppressed during the dissolution of the monasteries and forfeited their lands to the Crown, which in 1542 sold Hampton Gay to Leonard Chamberlayne of Shirburn. In 1544 Chamberlayne sold the estate to John Barry of Eynsham, whose family owned Hampton Gay until they got into financial difficulties and sold it in 1682.

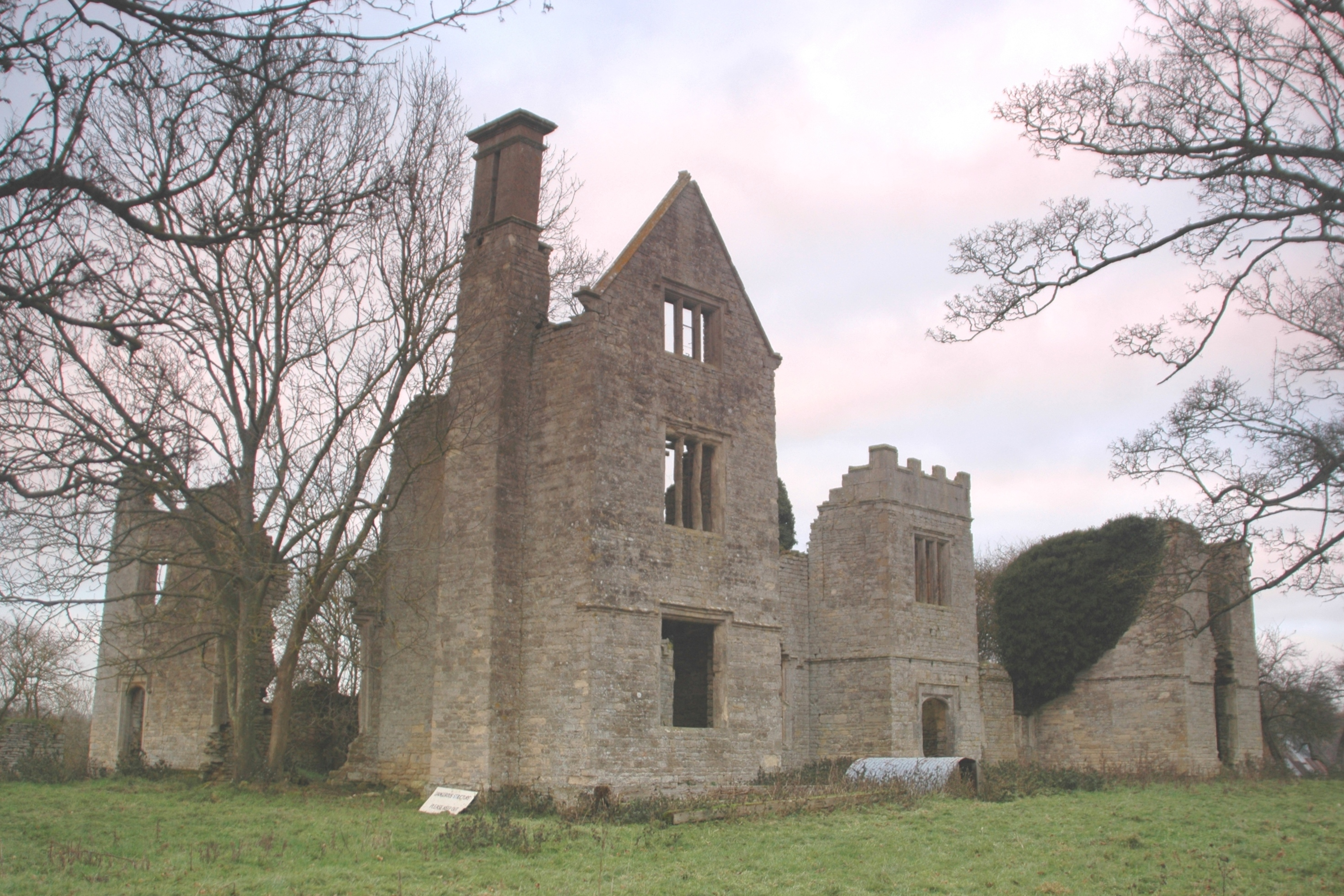
The neglected ruin of Hampton Gay's 16th century manor house is registered by English Heritage as being "at risk"

The new owner was Sir Richard Wenman, MP who in 1686 became 4th Viscount Wenman. Wenman died in 1690 and his widow sold Hampton Gay in 1691 to William Hindes of Priors Marston in Warwickshire. The Hindes family owned Hampton Gay until 1798 when Susannah, widow of Thomas Hindes, died without a male heir and left the manor to their daughter Anne and her husband. The manor changed hands again in 1809 and 1849, and in 1862 was bought by Wadham College, Oxford. In 1928 the college sold Hampton Gay to Colonel S.L. Barry of Long Crendon, Buckinghamshire, a descendant of the Barry family who had owned the manor in the 16th and 17th centuries. On his death in 1943 Col. Barry left the estate to his daughter Jeanne and her husband, the Honourable James McDonnell.

The Barry family built the manor house in the 16th century. It has an E-shaped plan with gabled wings and a battlemented central porch. Its Elizabethan form remained unaltered until the 19th century, including original Elizabethan panelling in its principal rooms, but in 1809 it was reported to be in a neglected state. In the 1880s the house was divided into two tenements but in 1887 it was gutted by fire. It has never been restored and remains an ivy-clad ruin. It is a Grade II listed building and a scheduled monument. Early in the 21st century English Heritage placed the manor house ruins on its register of historic buildings at risk, listing its priority as "A" and its condition as "very bad".

== Parish church ==
Tithe records show that Hampton Gay had a parish church by 1074. The Church of England parish church of Saint Giles had included features from at least as early as the 13th century, but in 1767–72 the Rev. Thomas Hindes, a member of the family that then owned the manor, had it completely rebuilt. In 1842 the antiquarian J.H. Parker condemned St. Giles' Georgian architecture as "a very bad specimen of the meeting-house style". In 1859–60 the curate, Rev. F. C. Hingeston, altered the church to his own designs, replacing its round-headed Georgian windows with ones in an Early English Gothic style and having the south doorway re-cut in a Norman revival fashion. St. Giles contains a number of monuments, most of them to the Barry family. The most notable is a 17th-century wall monument with kneeling effigies of Vincent and Anne Barry and their daughter Lady Katherine Fenner. St. Giles' parish is now part of the Church of England benefice of Akeman, which includes the parishes of Bletchingdon, Chesterton, Kirtlington, Middleton Stoney, Wendlebury and Weston-on-the-Green.

== Economic and social history ==
Hampton Gay had a water mill on the River Cherwell by 1219, when it became the property of Osney Abbey. It was a grist mill until 1681, when Vincent Barry leased it to a Mr Hutton, who converted it into a paper mill. In 1684 Hutton took over the corn mill at Adderbury Grounds, 12 miles (19 km) upstream of Hampton Gay, and converted that into a paper mill. The mills produced pulp, but the paper was made in batches by hand until 1812, when Hampton Gay mill was re-equipped with a modern Fourdrinier machine that made paper mechanically and continuously. In 1863–73 the paper mill was rebuilt with a gasworks, steam engine and other machinery. In 1875 it was destroyed by fire but from 1876 it was restored to production. In 1880 it had both a water wheel powered by the river and a steam engine fed by a Cornish boiler, and could produce about a ton of paper per day. The tenants running the mill were J. and B. New, and when the manor house was divided they became tenants of one of its two portions. However, by 1887 the News had gone bankrupt and their stock in trade was sold to settle unpaid rent.

Hampton Gay's population was more numerous in mediaeval times than at present. However it declined, and in 1428 the village was exempted from taxation because it had fewer than 10 householders. John Barry, who bought the manor in 1544, had made his money from wool, and he or his heirs enclosed land at Hampton Gay for sheep pasture. In 1596 Hampton Gay villagers joined those from Hampton Poyle who were plotting an agrarian revolt against the enclosures. Led by Bartholemew Steer who farmed the land at Hampton Gay, the rebels planned to murder landowners including Vincent Barry and his daughter and then to march on London. A carpenter at Hampton Gay warned Barry, five ringleaders were arrested and taken to London for trial, Bartholemew Steer, who was recognised as the leader was sentenced to be hanged drawn and quartered. However, the Government also recognised the cause of the rebels' grievance and determined that "order should be taken about inclosures...that the poor may be able to live". Parliament duly passed an Act (39 Eliz. 1 c. 2) to restore to arable use all lands that had been converted to pasture since the accession of Elizabeth I in 1558.

Manor Farm house was built early in the 17th century. It has a gabled front of three bays, original clustered chimney-stacks and a Stonesfield slate roof. A wing was added to the house in the 19th century. The Oxford and Rugby Railway between Oxford and Banbury was built past Hampton Gay in 1848–49. The nearest station provided was Kidlington, more than 1.5 miles (2.4 km) to the south. The Shipton-on-Cherwell train crash, one of the worst accidents in British railway history, occurred near the village in 1874. Workers at a paper mill in Hampton Gay assisted the injured, and the inquest took place at Hampton Gay manor. British Railways closed Kidlington station in 1964 but the railway remains open as part of the Cherwell Valley Line. Hampton Gay was a separate civil parish until 1932 when it was merged with the adjacent parish of Hampton Poyle. The population of Hampton Gay continued to dwindle from the closing of the mill to the 1990s and is classified as a hamlet. From 2002 there has been something of a resurgence of activity, with new farming families joining the community increasing the population considerably. Willowbrook Farm has attracted a lot of media attention through its educational and charitable work. It was established in 2003 and has been a pioneer of tayib (natural) farming based on principles of traditional regenerative agriculture, combining environmental and social sustainability. The founders, Dr Lutfi Radwan and Ruby Radwan were the subjects of a 2022 episode of the popular TV series "New Lives in the Wild".
