= Hampton Poyle =

Village in Oxfordshire, England

Coordinates: 51.836°N 01.272°W

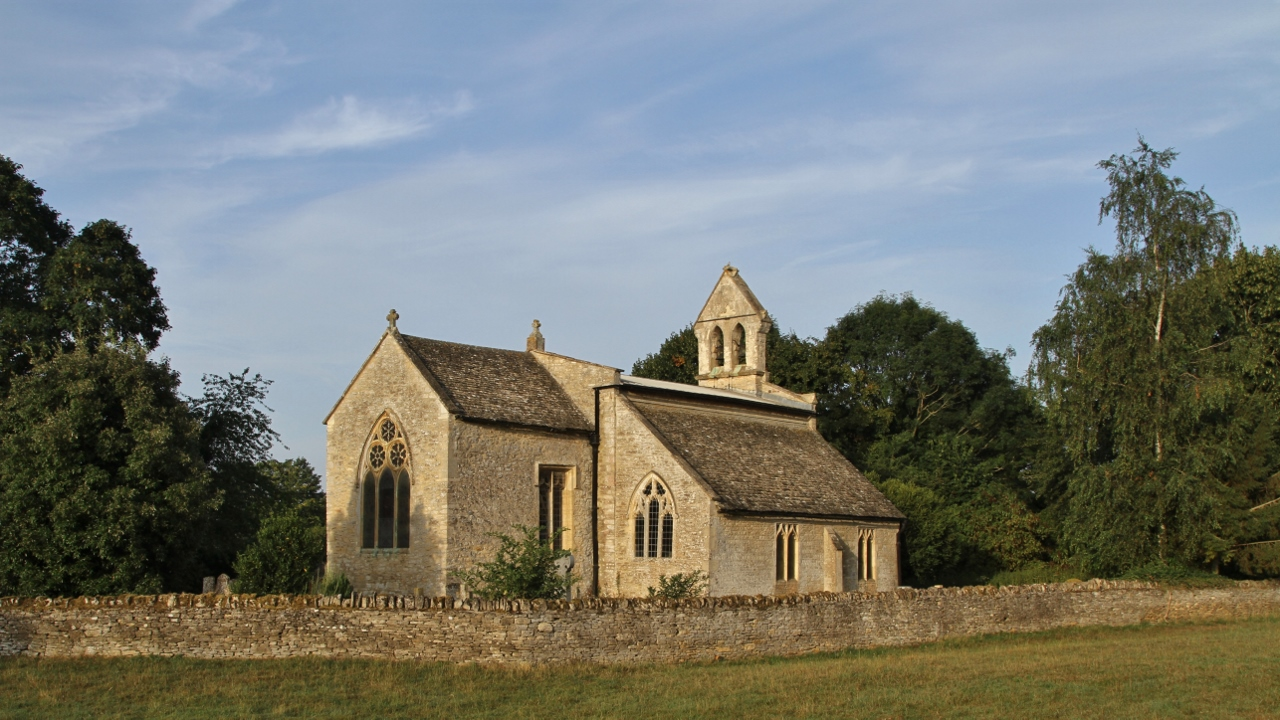
- St Mary's parish church

- Flag

- Location within Oxfordshire
- OS grid reference: SP5015
- Civil parish: Hampton Gay and Poyle
- District: Cherwell
- Shire county: Oxfordshire
- Region: South East
- Country: England
- Sovereign state: United Kingdom
- Post town: Kidlington
- Postcode district: OX5
- Dialling code: 01865
- Police: Thames Valley
- Fire: Oxfordshire
- Ambulance: South Central
- UK Parliament: Henley

Hampton Poyle is a village in the civil parish of Hampton Gay and Poyle, in the Cherwell district, in the county of Oxfordshire, England. It is the Cherwell in valley, about 1 mile (1.6 km) northeast of Kidlington and about 5 miles (8 km) north of the centre of Oxford.

Hampton Poyle was a separate civil parish of 807 acres (327 ha) until 1 April 1932, when it was merged with the neighbouring parish of Hampton Gay. In 1931 the parish had a population of 80.

== Name ==
In this instance the name Hampton derives from Old English hām and tūn – "village with a home farm". (Note: See Hampton (place name) > Etymology) The affix "Poyle" refers to Walter de la Poyle, who acquired the manor in the 13th century. It distinguishes the village from its neighbour Hampton Gay, which is about 1 mile (1.6 km) west-northwest.

The toponym for Hampton Poyle might be:

- Home farm of the "de la Poyle" manor.
- Village of the "de la Poyle" Manor Farm. (Note: Manor Farm is to the west of the church at the bottom of Church lane.)

== Manor ==
In the reign of Edward the Confessor in the 11th century there were five manors at Hamtone, each held by a different Anglo-Saxon thegn. The Domesday Book of 1086 records that these had been combined into a single manor of 10 hides held of the King by a person called Jernio or Gernio.

In 1166 Philip de Hanton held the manor and it was assessed at one knight's fee. The manor descended in his family until the 13th century. When his great-grandson Stephen died in 1252 it was assessed at half a knight's fee. Stephen left no male heir so the manor passed to his infant daughter Alice. By 1267 she had married Walter de la Poyle, who thus acquired the manor.

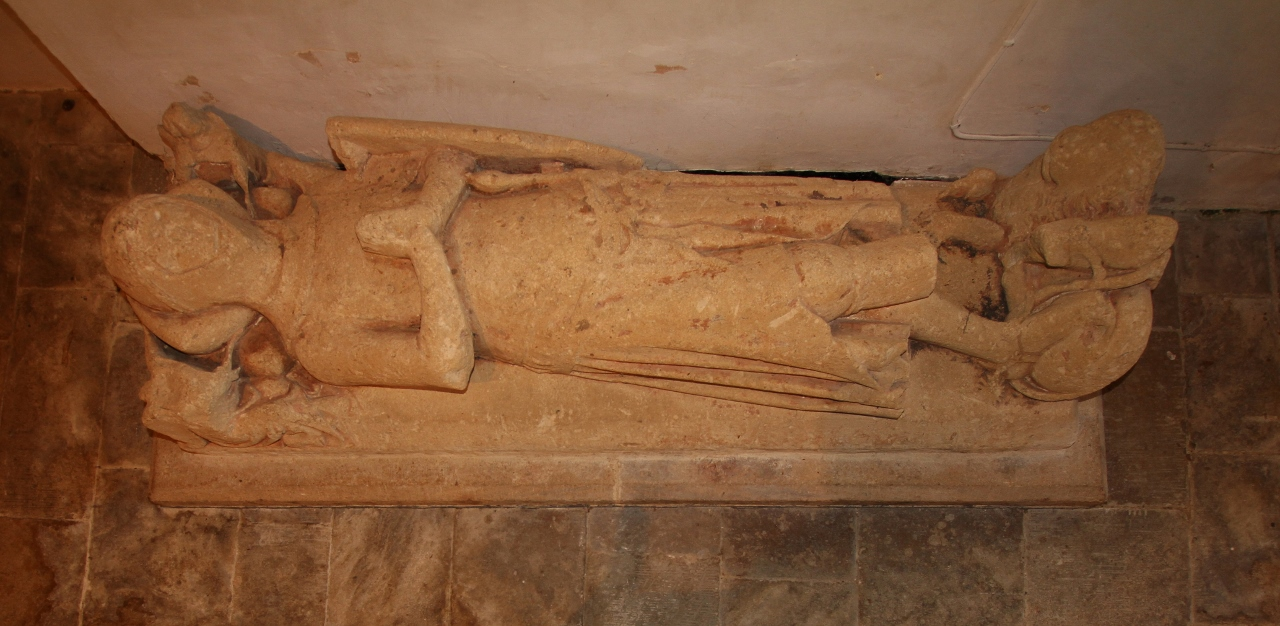
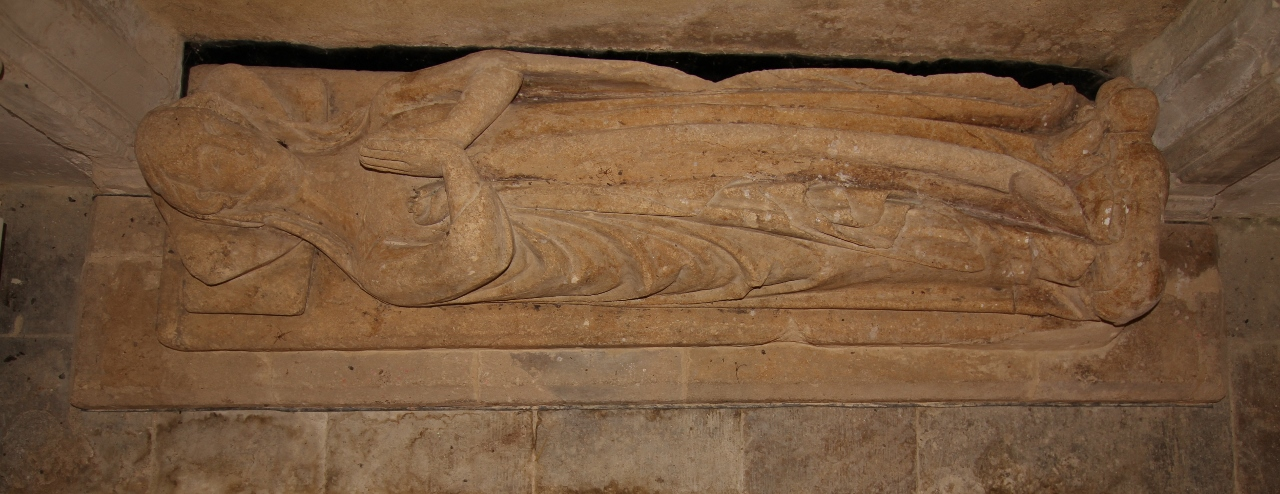
Early 14th-century stone effigies of a knight and a lady in St Mary's parish church

The manor descended in the de la Poyle family until early in the 15th century, when it passed to the Warner and Gaynesford families. In the 16th century it passed through several hands. In 1558 a James Bury died leaving his estates to be divided between his three daughters. Hampton Poyle passed to his daughter Jane, who was the wife of Ambrose Dormer of Ascot.

Ambrose Dormer left Hampton Poyle to his stepson Michael Dormer, who died in 1624 leaving his estates to his sister's four daughters. In 1625 Hampton Poyle manor was divided into four quarters, but one daughter sold her share to her sister Bridget, who was the wife of the politician Sir Henry Croke.

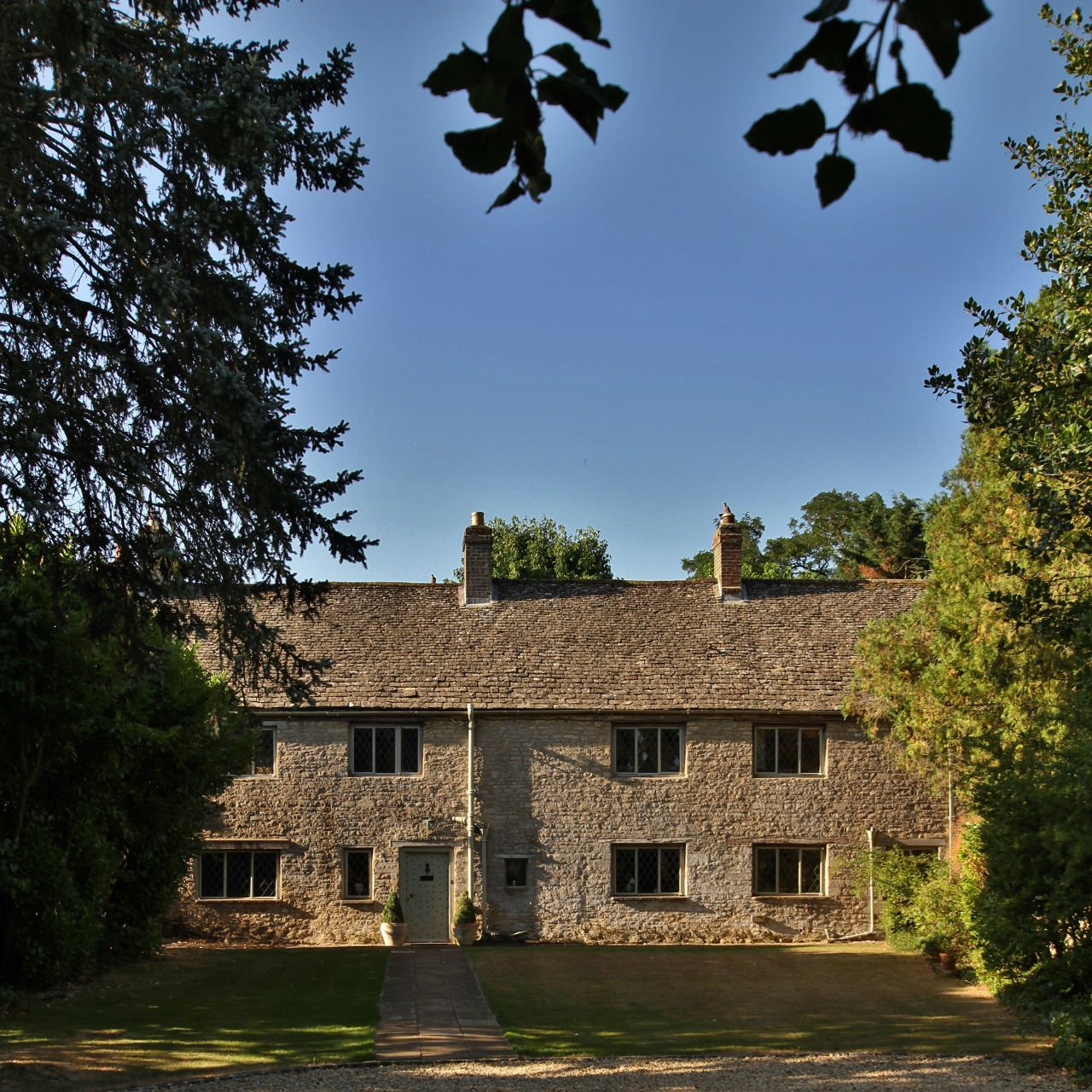
The Old Manor House, built in the 17th century

Henry's son Robert Croke was a politician who was a Royalist in the English Civil War. The Croke family's wealth was much reduced by the war, and in 1646 Robert had to compound for his estates. In 1648 Sir Henry and Sir Robert sold their share of Hampton Poyle to a John West. It then passed to his son, also called John, who mortgaged it.

In 1717 John West junior's widow Elizabeth and his mortgagees sold Hampton Poyle to Arthur Annesley, 5th Earl of Anglesey. In 1723 the Earl sold his Hampton estates to Christopher Tilson, a Treasury officer. It descended in the Tilson family until 1795, when John Henry Tilson sold it to Arthur Annesley, 1st Earl of Mountnorris. Hampton Poyle descended with the Annesley family until after the death of Arthur Annesley, 11th Viscount Valentia in 1927. In 1929 the Annesley estate at Hampton Poyle was broken up and sold to its tenants.

Te Old Manor House in Church Lane is 17th-century. It may have been built when the Dormer or Croke families held the manor.

== Parish church ==
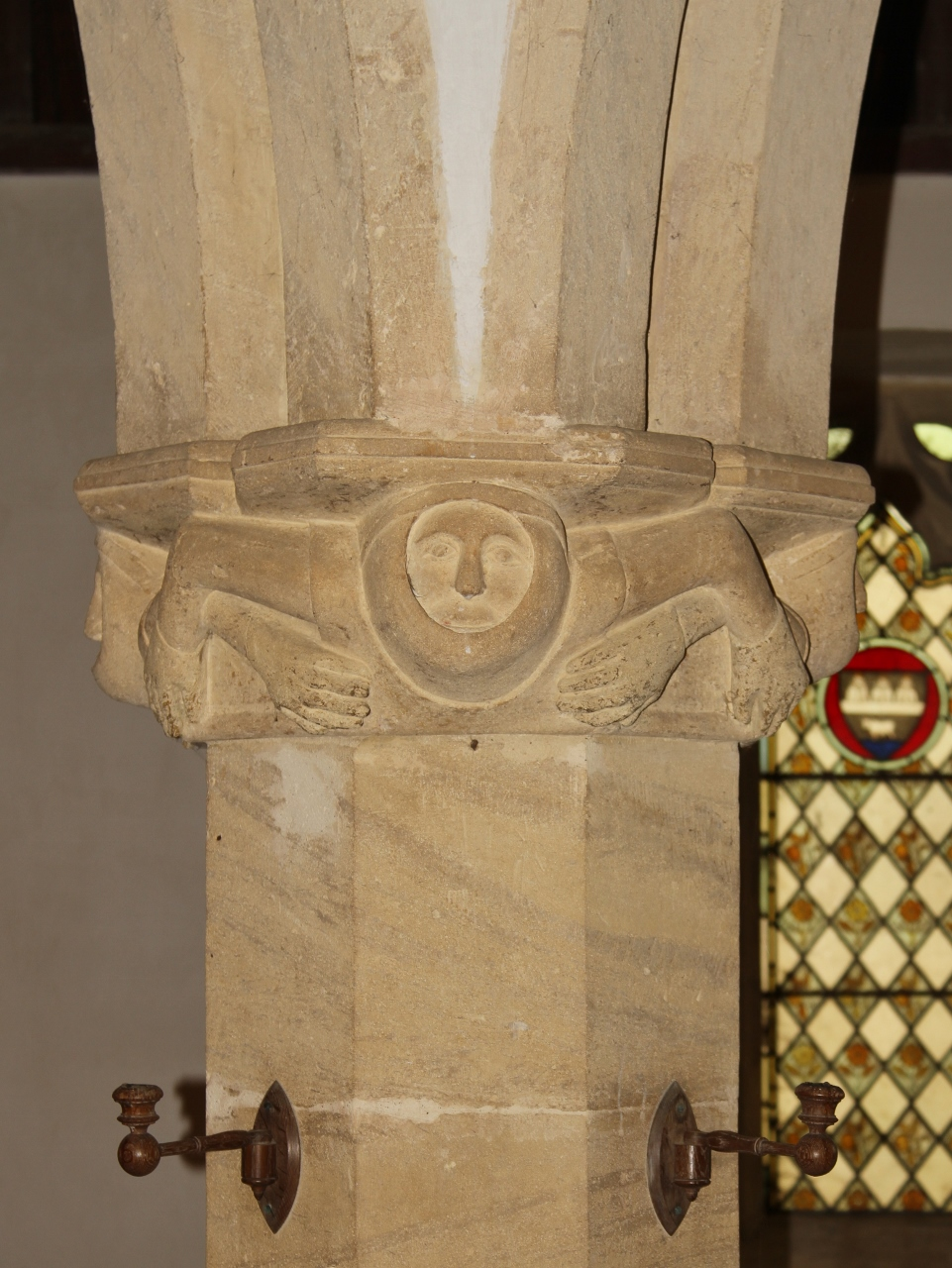
Capital of the 14th-century column in St Mary's north arcade

The Church of England parish church of Saint Mary the Virgin was built in the 13th century. The earliest known written record of it is a charter from about 1225. Features surviving from this period include the priest's doorway on the south side of the chancel and probably the three-light east window of the chancel.

In the 14th century north and south aisles of two bays were added to the nave and the present chancel arch was inserted. The arcades of the two aisles are dissimilar, and the south may be slightly earlier than the north. The two arches of the south arcade are separated by a surviving narrow section of nave wall. A third arch at right-angles to this section of wall divides the two bays of the south aisle.

Between the two arches of the north arcade is an octagonal column. Its capital is a relief of the upper halves of four hooded figures with their arms linked. This style of lively 14th-century sculpture is more common further north in Oxfordshire, including Adderbury, Alkerton, Bloxham and Hanwell. At the east end of the north aisle is another relief of a human face, forming a corbel that supports a piscina.

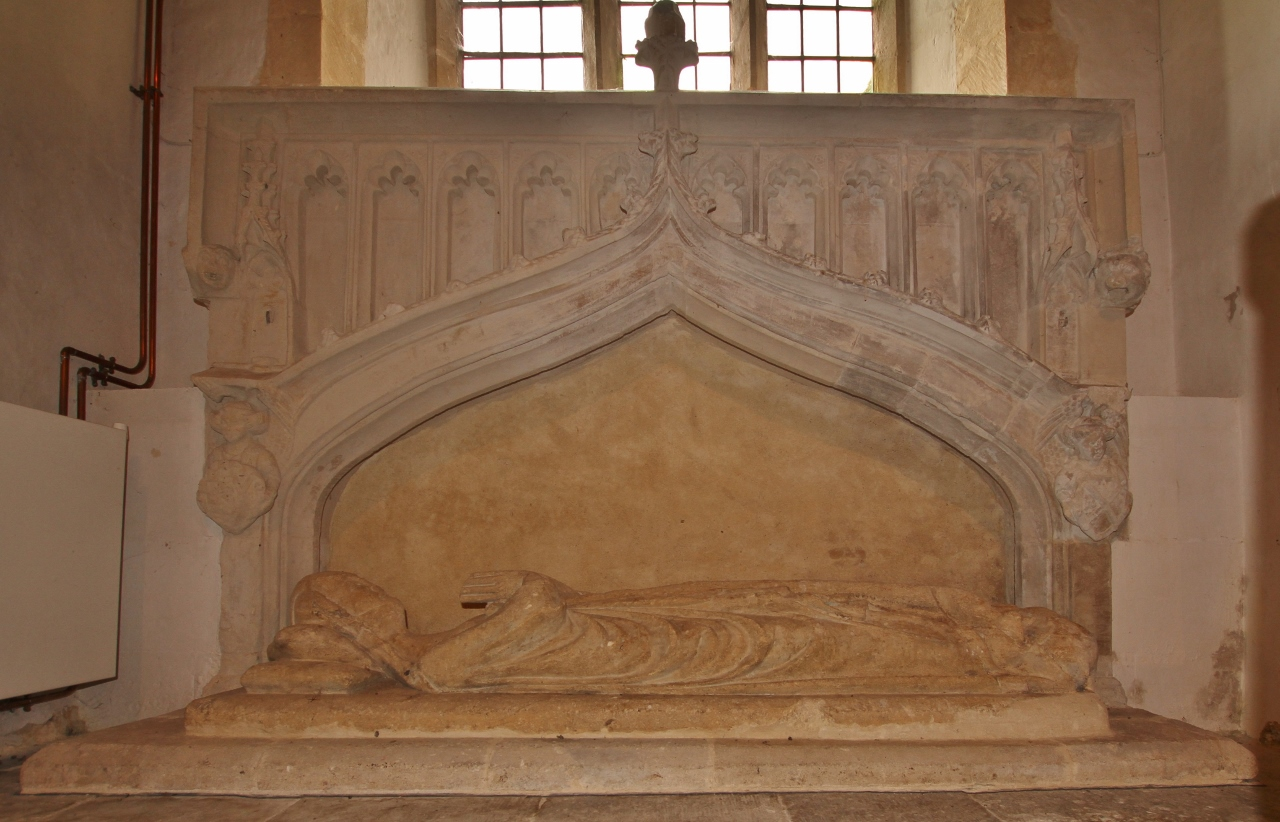
Poyle recess in St Mary's north aisle, now mismatched to an earlier and larger effigy of a lady

In the north aisle are 14th-century recumbent effigies of a knight in armour with a lion at his feet and a lady with a dog at her feet. The lady is in an arched, pinnacled and traceried recess bearing the arms of Poyle and another family impaling Poyle. But the recess is Perpendicular Gothic and thus later than the effigy. And it is too short for the effigy, suggesting it was made for another Poyle family monument, now lost.

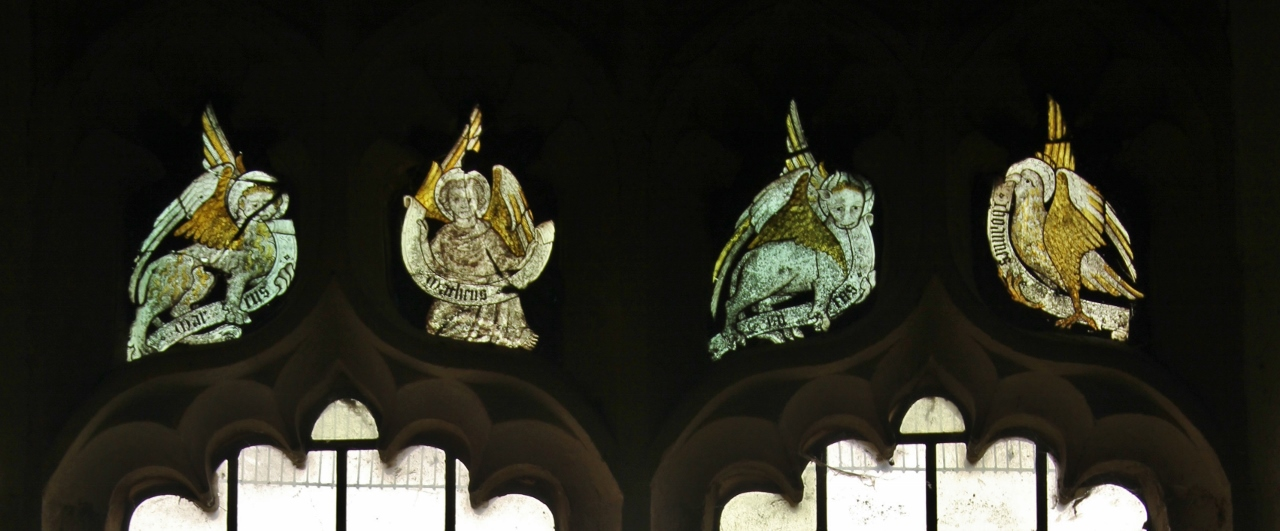
Early 15th-century symbols of the four Evangelists in the north window of St Mary's chancel

The north window of the chancel was inserted in the 15th century. Medieval stained glass, made about 1400–30, survives in four small lights at the top of the window. They represent the symbols of the four Evangelists, each with a Latin inscription.

At the west end of the nave is a bell-gable with two bells, one of which is 17th-century. In the south aisle is an 18th-century monument by Peter Scheemakers for Christopher Tilson (1669–1742), who throughout his adult life was a clerk to HM Treasury.

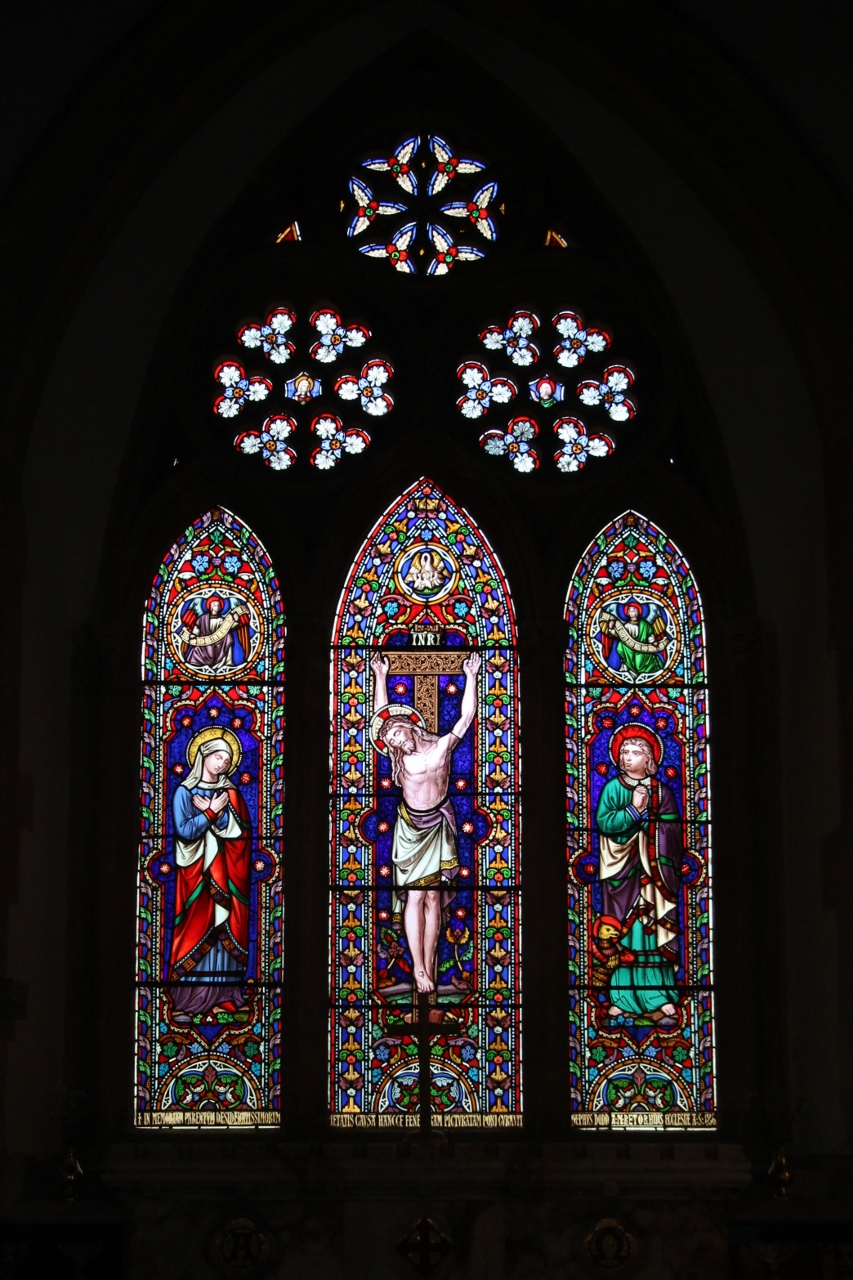
Gothic Revival stained-glass east window of St Mary's chancel

The church building was restored in 1844 and again in 1870, on the latter occasion under the direction of the Gothic Revival architect GE Street. In one of these restorations was inserted in the north windows of the north aisle and in the east window of the chancel. St Mary's is a Grade II* listed building.

St Mary's is now part of the Church of England parish of Kidlington with Hampton Poyle.

== Economic and social history ==
By 1086 Hampton Poyle had a watermill on the River Cherwell. It burnt down in 1771. No trace of it survives, except for its mill stream, which is south of the parish church and Manor Farm.

The parish had no school until the 19th century. A small school existed by 1833 and had become a National School by 1837. By 1871 the school was deemed inadequate, so children over six years of age were sent to the school at Bletchingdon 1 1/4 miles (2 km) to the north. After 1890 the school at Hampton Poyle was closed and children under six were also sent to Bletchingdon.

Poyle Court in Church Lane is a 17th-century house that was re-fronted in about 1800.

In 2014 the village adopted a flag based on the Arms of Walter de la Poyle. It is registered with the Flag Institute.

== Agrarian revolt ==
In 1596 Bartholomew Steer of Hampton Poyle led inhabitants of both his own village and Hampton Gay to plot an agrarian revolt against landowners enclosing arable land and turning it into sheep pasture. The rebels planned to murder landowners including the lord of the manor of Hampton Gay and then to march on London.

A carpenter at Hampton Gay warned the lord of that manor. Five ringleaders were arrested and taken to London for trial. Steer was tortured and in 1597 two of his co-conspirators were sentenced to be hanged and quartered.

However, the Government also recognised the cause of the rebels' grievance and determined that "order should be taken about inclosures... that the poor may be able to live". Parliament duly passed an Act (39 Eliz. 1 c. 2) to restore to arable use all lands that had been converted to pasture since the accession of Elizabeth I in 1558.

== Amenities ==
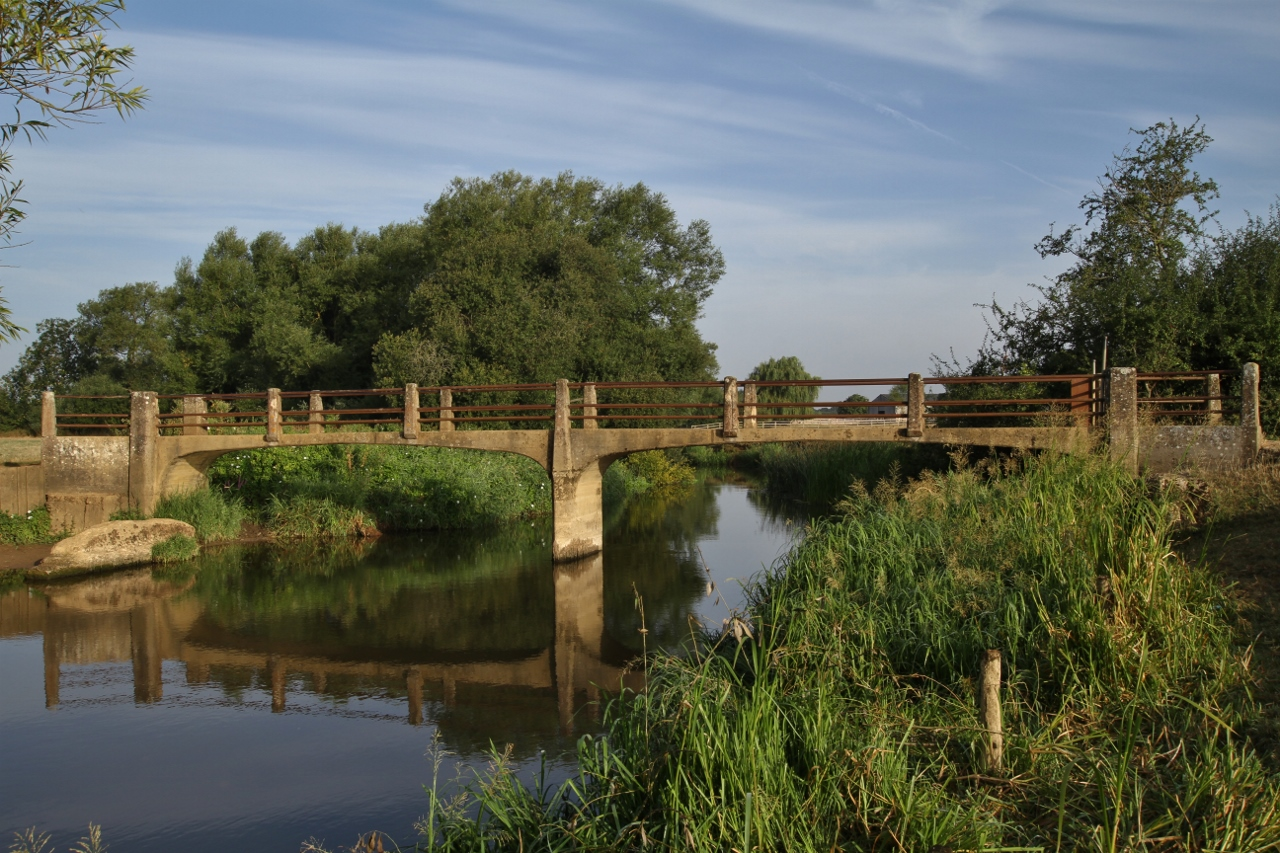
Footbridge over the River Cherwell bearing a footpath to Kidlington

Hampton Poyle has one public house, The Bell. It is now also a restaurant and boutique hotel.

=== Public transport ===
Grayline bus route 24 serves Hampton Poyle, linking it with Oxford via Oxford Parkway in one direction and Bicester via Bletchingdon, Kirtlington, Weston-on-the-Green and Wendlebury in the other. Buses run from Mondays to Saturdays, six times a day in each direction. There is no late evening service, and no service on Sundays or bank holidays.

== Sources ==
- Ekwall, Eilert (1960) [1936]. Concise Oxford Dictionary of English Place-Names (4th ed.). Oxford: Oxford University Press. Hampton. ISBN 0198691033.
- Lobel, Mary D, ed. (1959). "Hampton Poyle". A History of the County of Oxford. Victoria County History. Vol. 6: Ploughley Hundred. London: Oxford University Press for the Institute of Historical Research. pp. 160–168.
- Sherwood, Jennifer; Pevsner, Nikolaus (1974). Oxfordshire. The Buildings of England. Harmondsworth: Penguin Books. pp. 630–631. ISBN 0-14-071045-0.
- Walter, John (2004). "Bartholomew Steer". In Matthew, HCG; Harrison, Brian (eds.). The Oxford Dictionary of National Biography. Vol. 52. London: Oxford University Press. pp. 371–372.
