= Oxfordshire rising of 1596 =

The Oxfordshire rising took place in November 1596 under the rule of Queen Elizabeth I of England during times of bad harvest and unprecedented poverty. A small group of impoverished men developed a plan to seize weapons and armour and march on London, hoping to attract "200 or 300... from various towns of that shire". They met on Enslow Hill on 21 November, but without any of the assumed support were quickly arrested, and tortured due to suspicions of a wider conspiracy. A year later two of the men were hanged, drawn, and quartered for their treason.

== Background ==
The years 1596 to 1598 were the worst of many years for the English population, as bad harvests coincided with outbreaks of disease, as well as a fall in wages which forced many people into starvation. Given the state of the poorest classes, those with property felt threatened by revolt, a fact not helped by the boom in publishing of sensationalist literature detailing the many 'crimes' of vagrants thanks to new printing technology. Over 20% of the rural population were considered 'poor' (i.e. impoverished) and so these fears were easy to feed. Furthermore, as it was up to the local gentry and JPs (Justices of the Peace) to enforce these laws there was a great deal of inconsistency in their application.

As population levels started to rise in the second half of the sixteenth century, pressure on land for food and work increased, and the enclosure of common land, whether agreed amicably among farmers or enforced illegally by greedy landlords, was seen by distressed groups as the cause of their grief. For much of the period grain prices rose ahead of wool prices and enclosure attracted less political attention. By the 1590s, however, private profit was replacing communal co-operation. Allegations that common lands had been fenced off, villagers denied rights of pasturage, and land converted from arable to pasture lay behind events in Oxfordshire in 1596.

== The 'rising' ==
The ringleader of the rising was a carpenter from Hampton Poyle named Bartholomew Steer. Along with two other men, Steer formulated a plan to protest against enclosures after between forty and sixty men visited the county's Lord Lieutenant, Lord Norreys, and asked him to help the poor. However the protest soon escalated into a more violent plot, first to throw down the enclosures themselves and then to seize weapons from the Lord Lieutenant's residence and kill several local landowners. Steer and two brothers, millers James and Richard Bradshaw, tried to recruit further support as they travelled round the local area.

Steer arranged for the plotters to meet on Enslow Hill at 9pm on 21 November, assuming they would attract wide support, and proposed they march to London after attacking local targets in order to link up with the London apprentices. Steer seems to have selected Enslow Hill due to folk memories of a previous rising (centred on resistance to religious reforms) that was suppressed there in 1549: he told one man that the commons had risen and then been "hanged like dogs" after being persuaded to return home, but that he intended to go through with his plan and "would never yield". However, there were some signs that people were nervous about committing themselves. When Steer asked his brother how much support he could expect in Witney and received a discouraging response, he commented that "if all men were of that mind they might live like slaves as he did. But for himself happ what would, for he could die but once and [...] he would not alwaies live like a slave".

Four men gathered at Enslow Hill on the 21st: Steer, Thomas Horne, a servant from Hampton Gay, Robert Burton, a Beckley mason, and Edward Bompass, a fuller who had promised to bring support from the neighbouring village of Kirtlington., However, no one else appeared and the gathering disbanded after two hours. It is possible that they were victims of a misunderstanding, as a larger group of armed men, who remained anonymous, had been seen to gather on the hill the preceding Sunday. It also seems likely that the men's proposal of violent methods and their marginal status in the community as young, landless artisans (Steer and Bompass were both 28, and others involved were of a similar age and status) contributed to the lack of support. The plotters were quickly arrested after a servant, Roger Symonds, who Steer had tried to recruit, informed his landlord of the plan. Although Lord Norreys himself tried to play down the significance of the 'rising', the Privy Council clearly considered this rebellion threatening in the context of the time and the climate of general dissatisfaction, particularly as Robert Burton was taken into custody in London, where he may have been attempting to solicit support among the City apprentices. Sir Edward Coke advised that the ringleaders were liable for charges of treason, "making war against the Queen", under a 1571 Act, although it appears that not all the statute's legal requirements had in fact been met.

Five principal ringleaders - Steer, James and Richard Bradshaw, Bompass, and Burton - were taken to London tied to the backs of horses and closely guarded to prevent their conversing with one another. There they were lodged in separate prisons and interrogated. Around twenty other men were also imprisoned or interrogated, though not charged with treason as the ringleaders eventually were. As the authorities were eager to discover if any gentry were involved in the conspiracy, the use of torture was authorised, and Coke pursued the charges with extreme aggression, despite the misgivings of several judges regarding his interpretation of the statutes. Coke appears to have based his arguments on defective knowledge of a riot that took place on May Day 1517, the so-called "Evil May Day". Steer in his defiant testimony claimed that he "stood in no need" himself, but "meant to have risen to help his poor friends, and other poor people in misery".

Despite the charge of treason, on the terms of the 1571 statute, being "shaky" at best, the men were tried before an Oxfordshire jury including several men who had been personally threatened by the plot. Steer and James Bradshaw were both absent from 24 February arraignment, suggesting they had died in prison in the meantime. Two plotters, Burton and Richard Bradshaw, were convicted on the treason charge and eventually executed on Enslow Hill, within sight of the enclosures they had wished to remove. The fate of Bompass is unclear, though it is possible he also died in prison. Though the trials themselves and executions passed unrecorded at the time, the convictions for treason of Burton and Bradshaw were used by Coke in the trial of Robert Devereux, 2nd Earl of Essex to support his prosecution. In a more positive outcome of the 'rising', Parliament subsequently passed an Act halting further enclosures.
