= Thomas Hingston =

English antiquarian

Thomas Hingston MD (bap. 1799, died 1837) was an English antiquarian.

== Life ==
Hingston, third son of Margaret and John Hingston, clerk in the custom house, was baptised at St Ives, Cornwall, on 9 May 1799, and educated in his native town and at Queens' College, Cambridge, however, he did not take any degree.

His medical studies commenced in the house of a general practitioner, whence in 1821 he removed to Edinburgh. In 1822 he won the medal offered by George IV to the University of Edinburgh for a Latin ode on the occasion of his visit to Scotland. The original poem is lost, but a translation made by his brother is preserved in The Poems of Francis Hingeston, 1857, pp. 129–31.

In 1824 he was admitted to the degree of MD, after publishing an inaugural dissertation, De Morbo Comitiali, and in the same year he brought out a new edition of William Harvey's De Motu Cordis et Sanguinis, with additions and corrections.

Hingston first practised as a physician at Penzance 1828–32, and afterwards removed to Truro. He contributed to the Transactions of the Geological Society of Cornwall a dissertation On the use of Iron among the Earlier Nations of Europe, iv. 113–34. To vol. iv. of Davies Gilbert's Parochial History of Cornwall he furnished A Memoir of William of Worcester, and an essay On the Etymology of Cornish Names.

He died at Falmouth, whither he had removed for the benefit of the sea air, 13 July 1837.
