= Enslow =

Hamlet in Oxfordshire, England

Coordinates: 51.861°N 01.304°W

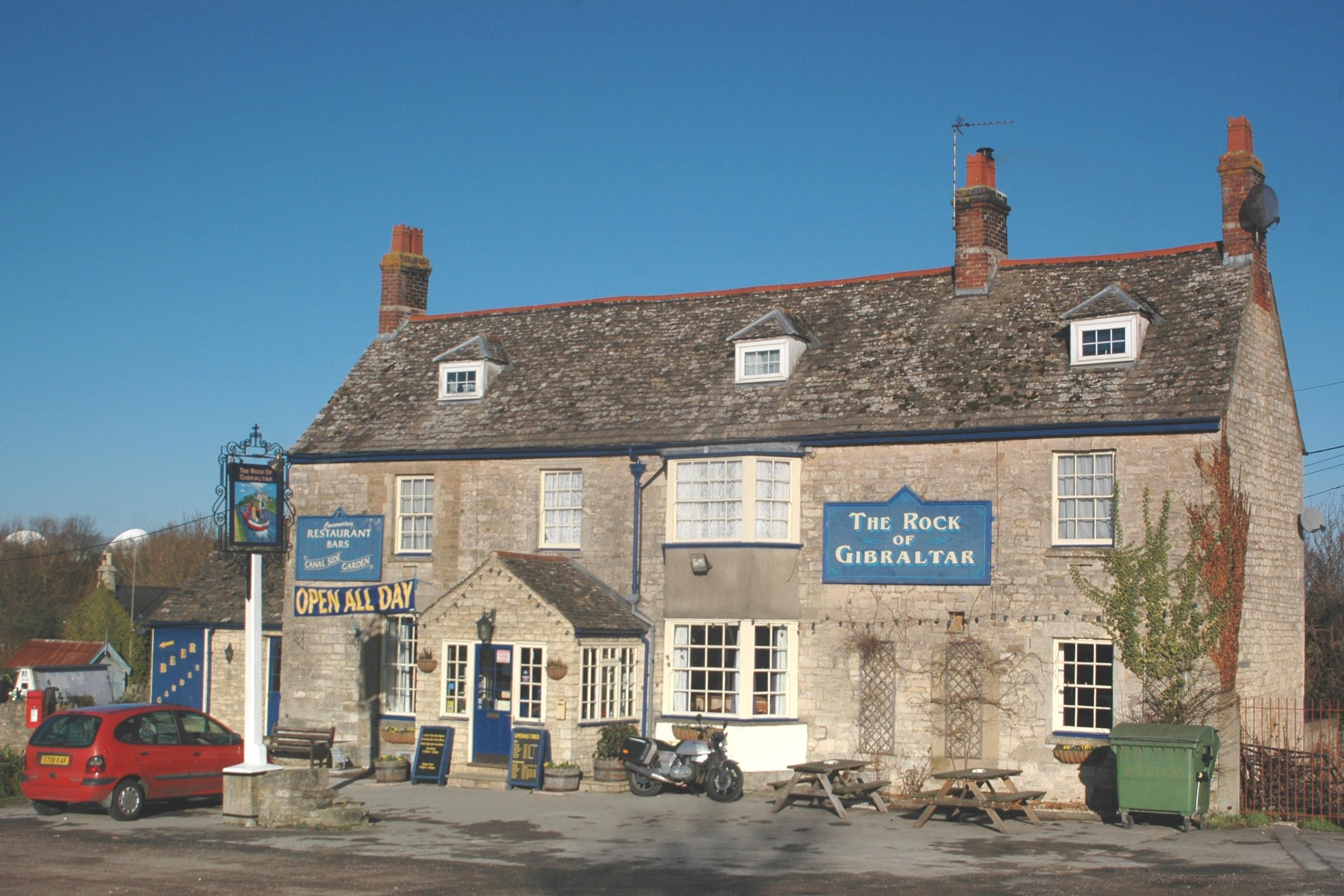
- The Rock of Gibraltar public house

- Location within Oxfordshire
- OS grid reference: SP4818
- Civil parish: Bletchingdon
- District: Cherwell
- Shire county: Oxfordshire
- Region: South East
- Country: England
- Sovereign state: United Kingdom
- Post town: Kidlington
- Postcode district: OX5
- Dialling code: 01869
- Police: Thames Valley
- Fire: Oxfordshire
- Ambulance: South Central
- UK Parliament: Banbury
- Website: Bletchingdon Parish

Enslow is a hamlet on the banks of both the River Cherwell and the Oxford Canal in Bletchingdon civil parish, Oxfordshire. The medieval main road linking London with Chipping Norton and Worcester crosses the Cherwell at Enslow. There was a bridge here by the time that John Leland toured England in 1538–43. John Ogilby's Britannia Atlas of 1675 records a timber bridge here that he called "Emley Bridg". In 1718 the road was made into a turnpike and at some stage the timber bridge was replaced by one with pointed stone arches. In 1814 the stone bridge was widened on its downstream side. to almost double its former width. In contrast with the older upstream side of the bridge, the 1814 arches are semicircular. The road is now the A4095.

Enslow Hill, now the site of a quarry, is thought to have been identical with the Spelleburge (Old English for "Speech Hill") recorded as a traditional meeting-place for Ploughley hundred in Anglo-Saxon times. The hill was the site of the unsuccessful Oxfordshire Rising of 1596 over enclosures of common land. The quarry is now the site of a Cable & Wireless Communications ground station.

Enslow had a water mill that was recorded in 1086 in the Domesday Book, and again in 1340 and in the 17th and 18th centuries. The arrival of the Oxford Canal led to the building of a wharf and associated buildings in 1788. Early in the 19th century the Rock of Gibraltar public house was built to serve the trade on and around the wharf. From 1845 the Oxford and Rugby Railway ran through the hamlet and in 1850 Bletchington railway station was built. British Railways closed the station in 1964 but the line remains open as part of the Cherwell Valley Line.

== Sources ==
- Jervoise, Edwyn (1932). The Ancient Bridges of Mid and Eastern England. Vol. III. Westminster: The Architectural Press for the SPAB. pp. 153–154.
- Lobel, Mary D, ed. (1959). "Bletchingdon". A History of the County of Oxford. Victoria County History. Vol. 6. pp. 56–71.
- MacDermot, Edward T. (1927). History of the Great Western Railway. Vol. I: 1833–1863. London: Great Western Railway. p. 300.
