= Neithrop =

Housing estates in Banbury, England

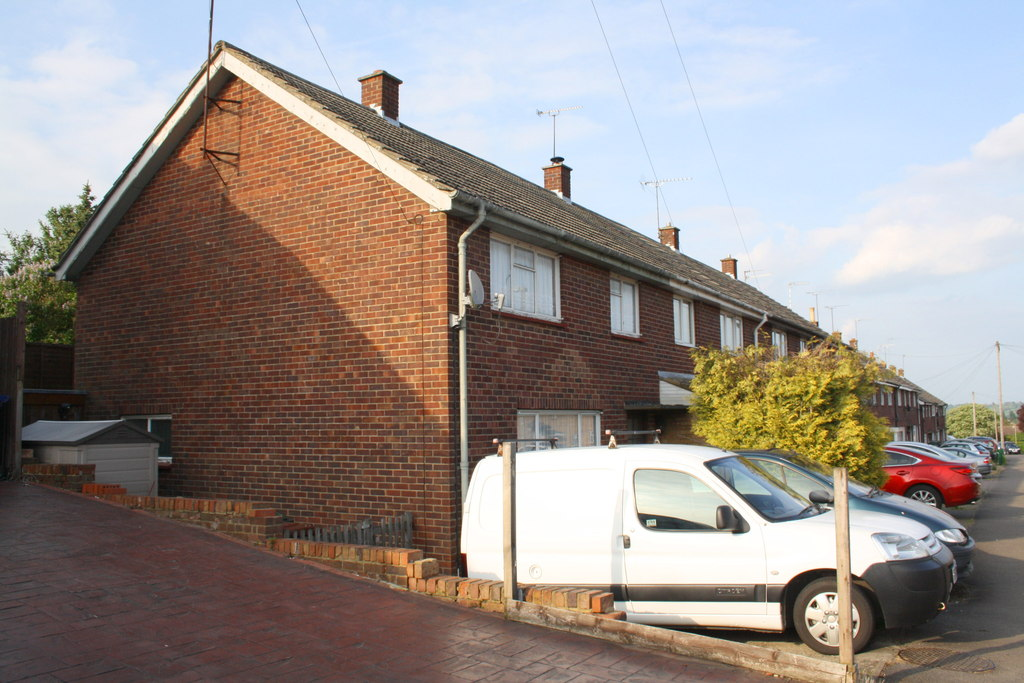
- Nos. 64 to 58 (evens) Prescott Avenue

- Location within Oxfordshire
- Civil parish: Banbury
- District: Cherwell
- Shire county: Oxfordshire
- Region: South East
- Country: England
- Sovereign state: United Kingdom

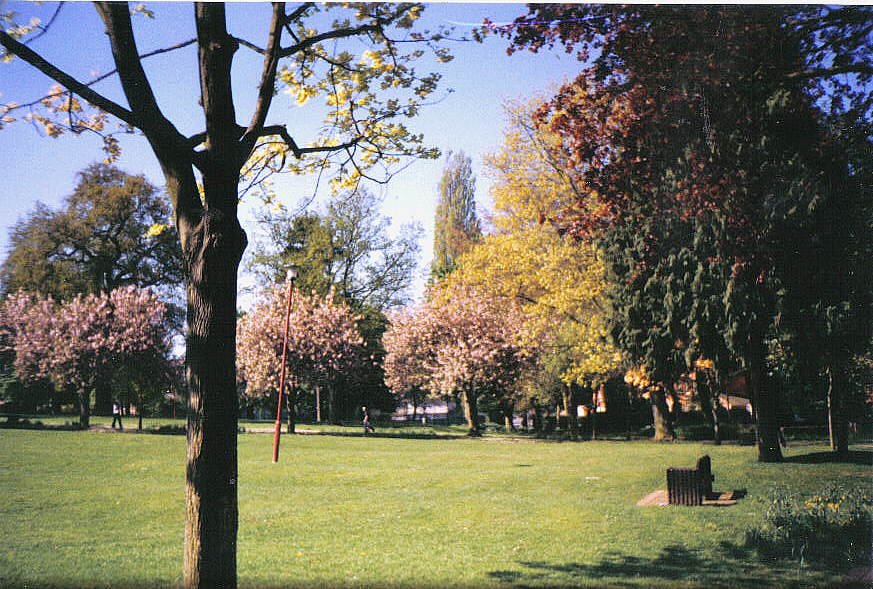
Banbury's Peoples' Park in Neithrop, during 2001.

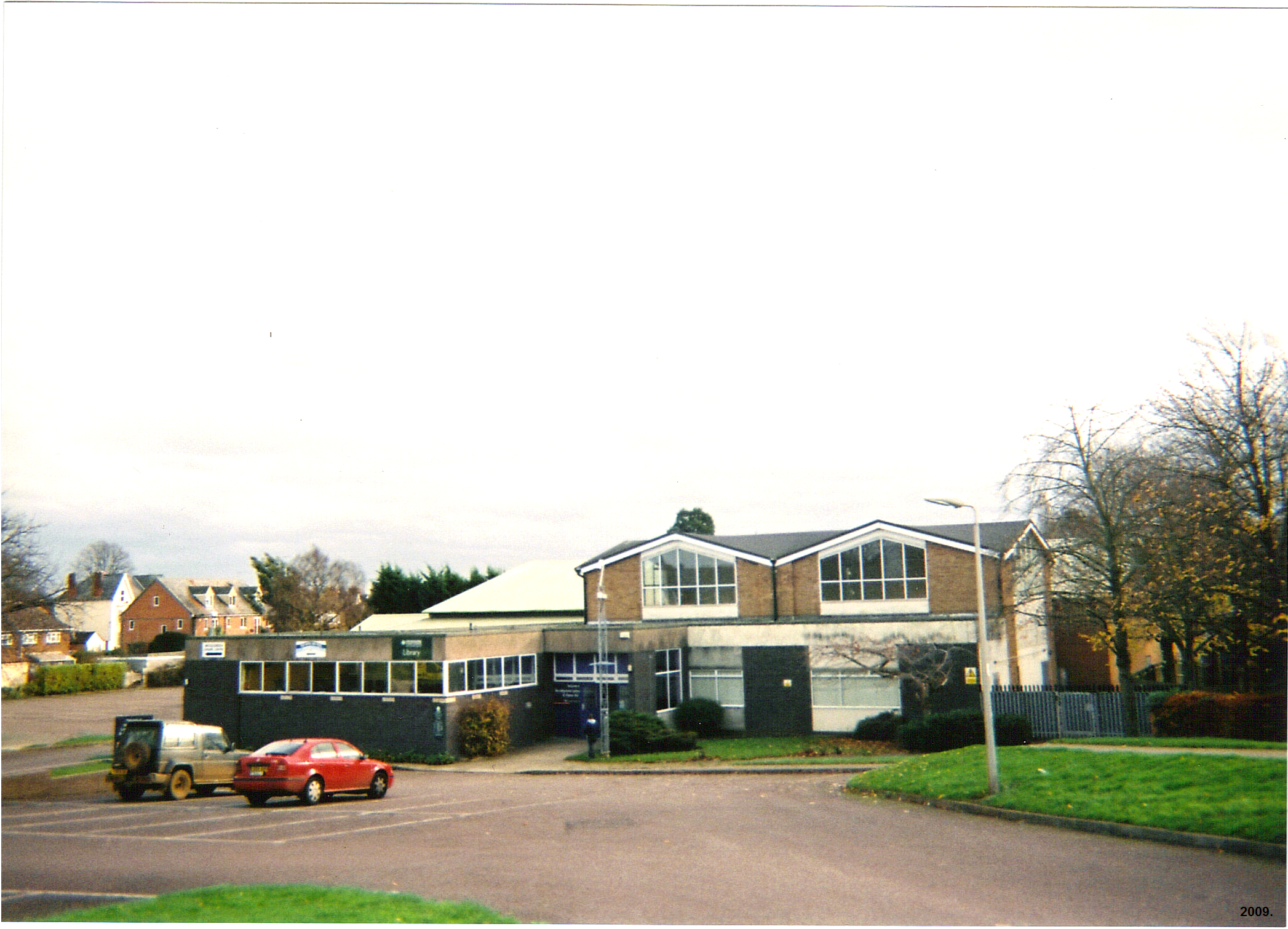
Neithrop Library in Woodgreen, Banbury in 2009.

Neithrop is an inner housing estate and part of the greater Neithrop ward of Banbury, in the Cherwell district, in the county of Oxfordshire, England. It is one of the oldest areas in Banbury, having first been first recorded as a hamlet in the 13th century. Neithrop, Woodgreen and Bretch Hill are three interconnecting housing estates.

== History ==
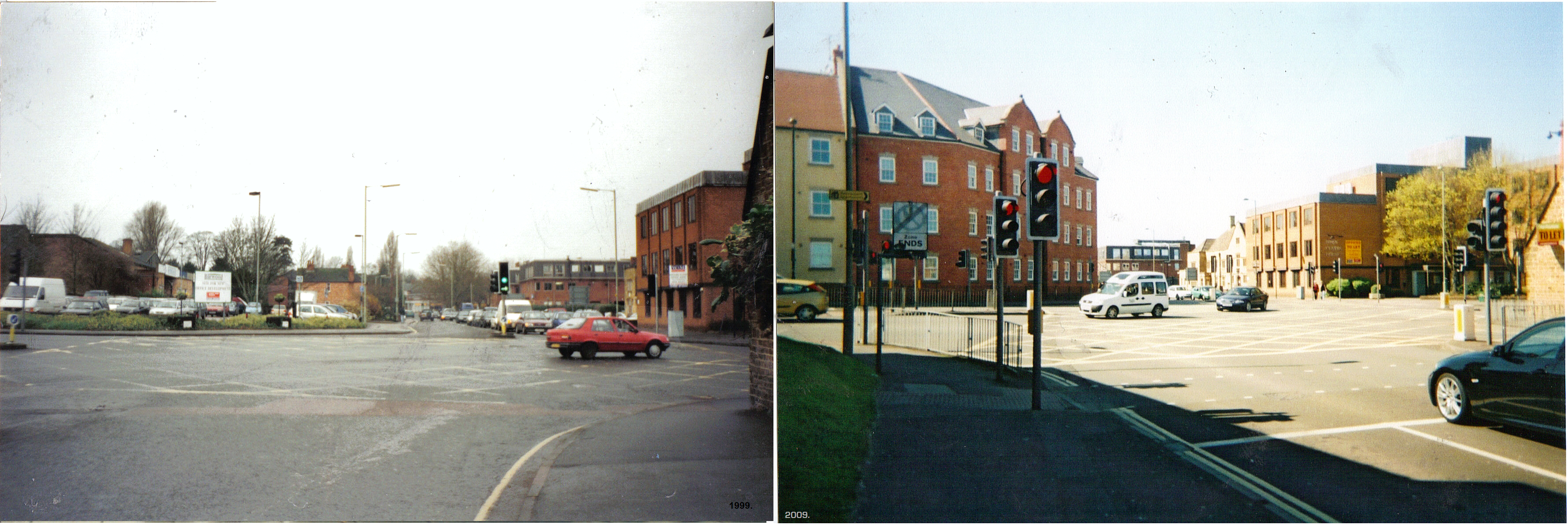
The innermost part of Neithrop at the "Shires" crossroads near Banbury town centre (L) in 1999, prior to the 2003 redevelopment, and (R) in 2009

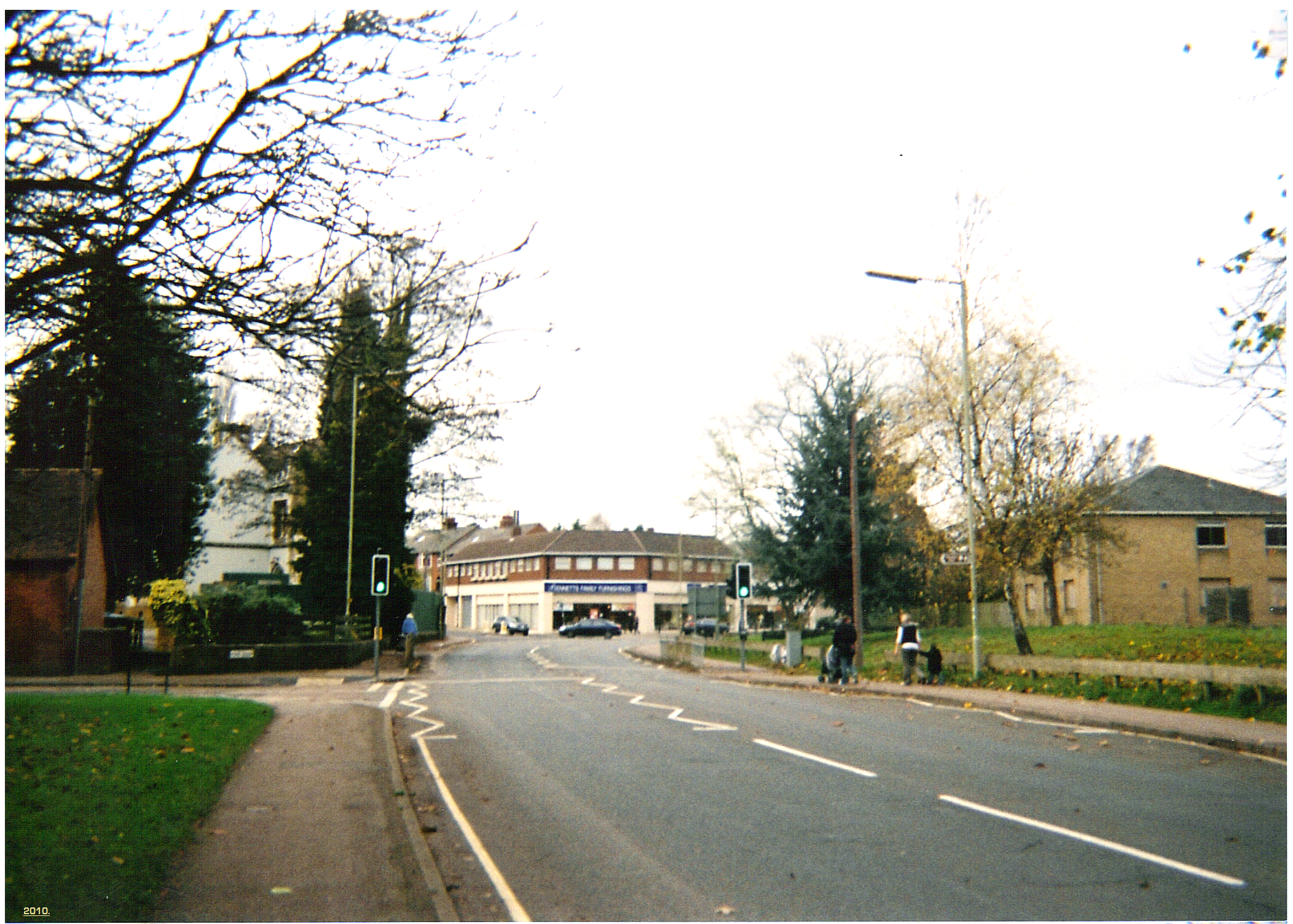
The furniture shop and the abandoned 1970s housing building in Neithrop

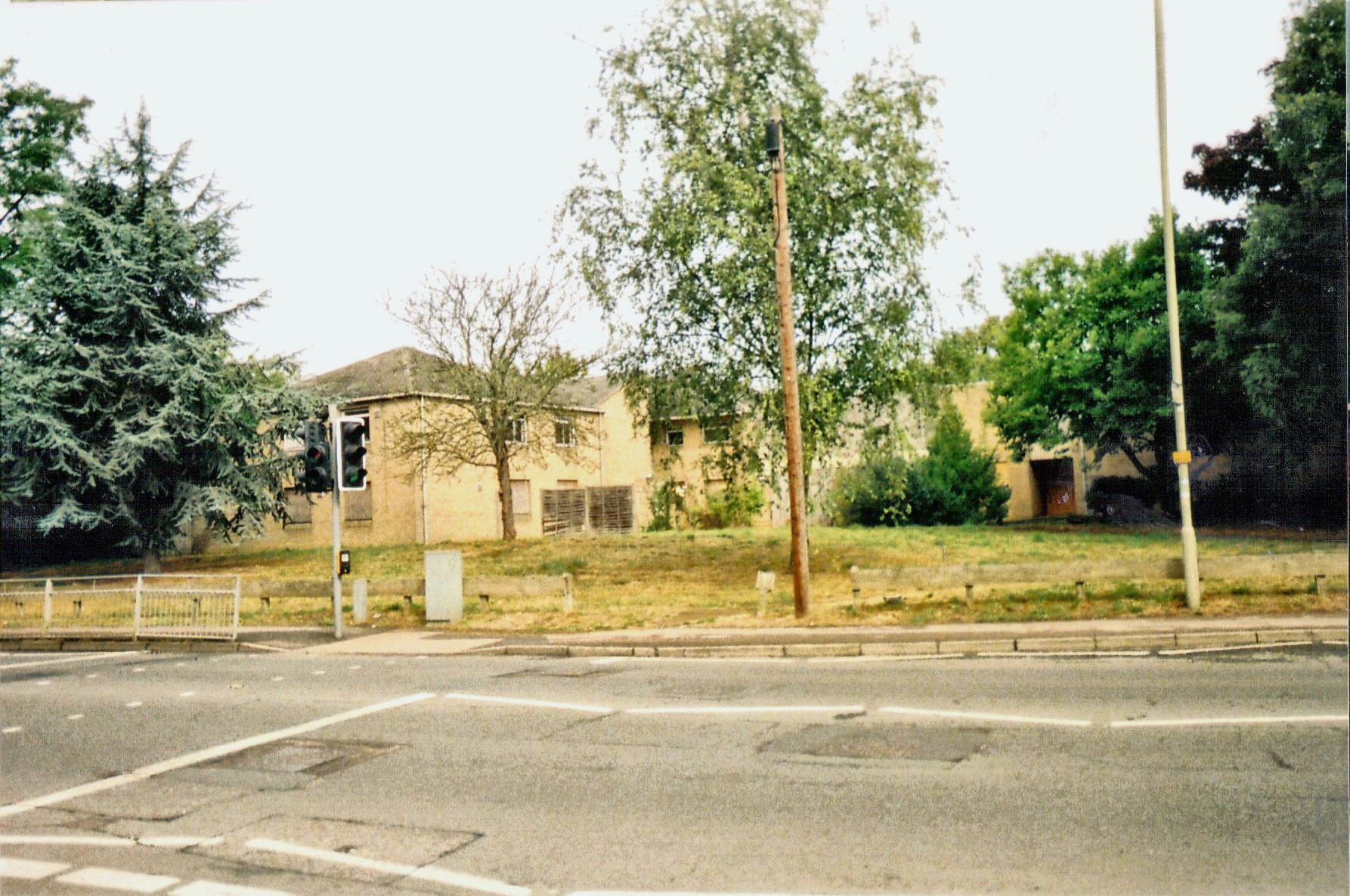
A Neithrop 1970s housing complex by the police station. It has been deserted since circa 2004. It was slated for redevelopment circa 2012–2013.

In 1247 the hundred of Banbury was valued at £5 a year and in 1441 "certainty money" due from the northern part of the hundred was 89s. 8d. It was made up of payments from Shutford, Claydon, Swalcliffe, Great Bourton and Little Bourton, Prescote, Hardwick, Calthorpe and Neithrop, Wickham, Wardington, Williamscot, Swalcliffe Lea, and the former "prebend" of Banbury. By 1568 these, except the rent from Wardington and amounted to 69s. 4d. in 1652, when the total profits of court were valued at 103s. 4d. a year in "certainty money". In 1875 payments were made only by Williamscot, Swalcliffe, Prescote, Great and Little Bourton, Neithrop, Claydon, and Shutford since the rest were freed from their rent obligations.

In 1225 there were 46 tenants in Neithrop with average land holding 1.3 yardlands, but by 1441 there were 21 tenants with an average holding 2.9 yardlands and by 1575 a further land amalgamation had been carried out with only 17 tenants retaining an average holding 3.5 yardlands. The Bishop of Lincoln's vast Banbury estate, except for Neithrop and Calthorpe, was sold to the Duke of Somerset in 1547, but by 1550 he granted it (except for Hardwick) to John Dudley, Earl of Warwick, then the Duke of Northumberland shortly afterwards, who in 1551 granted it to the Crown in exchange for other lands.

In 1545, Bishop Longland leased Easington to his holy registrar, John Frankyshe of Neithrop for 50 years from the expiry of the incumbent lease in 1561. The advance leasing of the episcopal estate was a phenomenon of the times. This part of Banbury was the scene of rioting in 1589 after the local maypole was destroyed by Puritans. Long before enclosure, the tenants of Neithrop had become freeholders, as recorded in the land deeds of 1583 to 1608 and 1614, with the permission of both Sir Anthony Cope and then his son Sir William Cope. The Land rights over the tenants' land of the former episcopal estate in the boroughs of Calthorpe and Neithrop seem to have passed to the Cope family, which also held property there which had been included in the Duke of Somerset's land grant of Hardwick to Anthony Cope in 1548. In the early 17th century the Copes granted the freehold of much of their Neithrop land to their tenants and lessees, such as the Parnells, in an act of great generosity for this time.

Further expansion in Neithrop occurred after 1850; thus St. Paul's Terrace and the houses on the west side of Paradise Road were among several small terraces that had been built in Neithrop village before 1881, besides some 50 houses in the newly laid out Park Road and Queen Street. A sawmill, timber yard and vine nursery had all come into existence behind the Magistrates court by 1882 and along Green Street and Nursery Lane, but only the Nursery Lane/Green Street vine nursery had survived until the 1920s. The by then town of Neithrop was formally incorporated into the borough of Banbury in 1889.

Banbury town council built the houses in King's Road and on the Easington estate at the time. Other working-class type houses were built at the south end of Britannia Road and the area to the east between 1881 and 1930, and also in both Old Grimsbury Road and Gibbs Road in Grimsbury. More up-market houses were built in both the Marlborough Road area and in Bath Road, Kings Road, Park Road, and Queen Street in Neithrop.

Neithrop used to be the site of Banbury's mid Victorian workhouse and later contagious diseases hospital, which was situated in Warwick Road for about 100 years. After World War II the workhouse was used as a hospital until it was demolished and built over in the 1980s. There have been various housing developments since the late 1980s. An old car show room and garage, opposite the Texaco garage, was demolished and replaced by a local housing scheme, in 2004, as was an old warehouse and car park that lay next to The Shires crossroads.

Neithrop was formerly a township in the parish of Banbury, in 1866 Neithrop became a separate civil parish, on 1 April 1932 the parish was abolished and merged with Banbury. In 1931 the parish had a population of 8165.

=== Major amenities ===
A major furniture shop, police station and a Texaco garage are located in the ward.

=== Schools ===
Neithrop is also home to a specialist school:

- Frank Wise School (primary specialist)

=== Recreational areas and parks ===
Neithrop is home to the People's Park which opened in 1910, has a bird house, tennis courts, a large field and a children's play area. The park is often used in the summer to hold small festivals. The park is also one of the town's biggest in terms of the area covered and one of the few major ones not to be built on a steep hill like Calthorpe Park is.

== Woodgreen ==
=== History ===
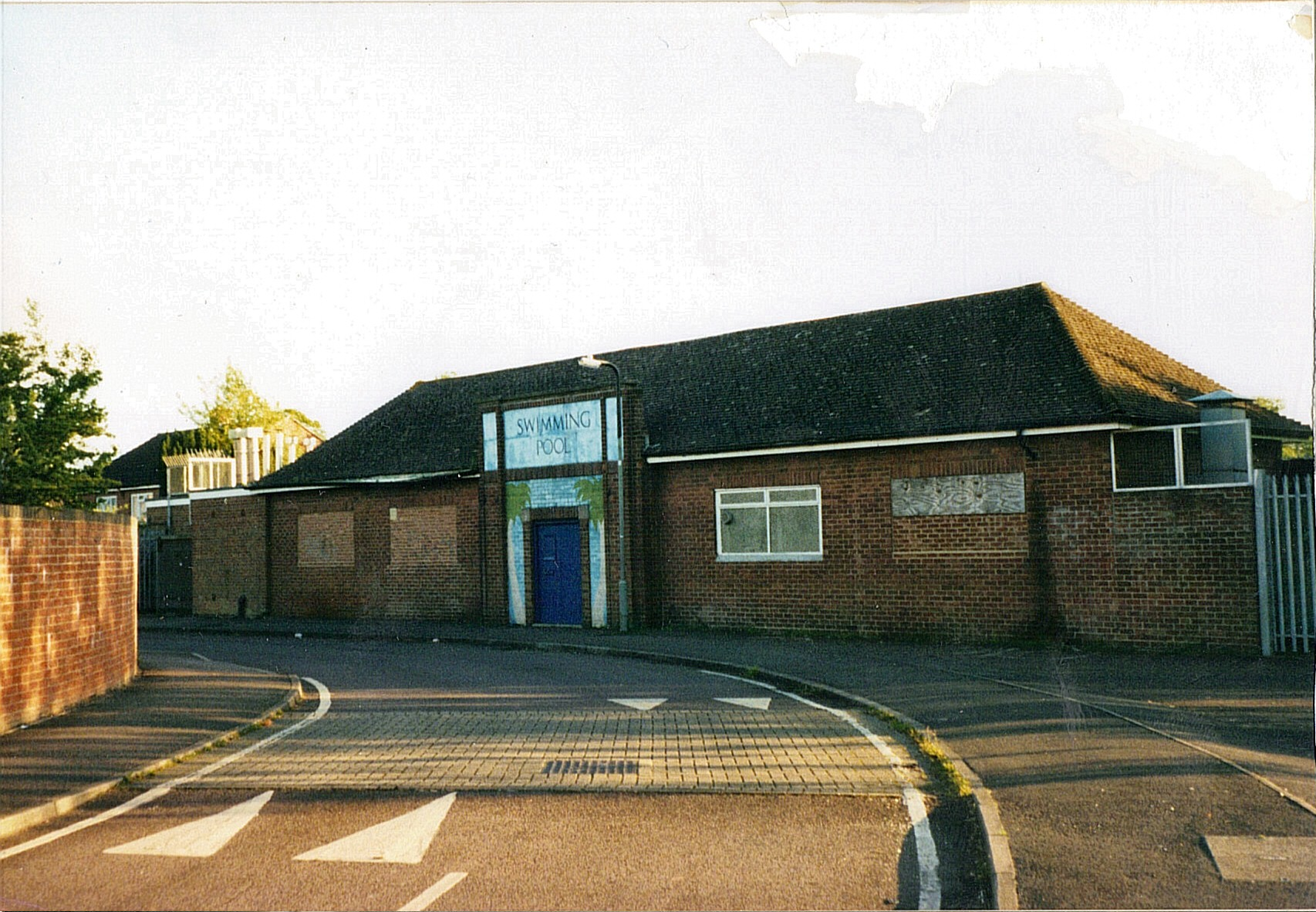
The popular Woodgreen swimming pool in 2004

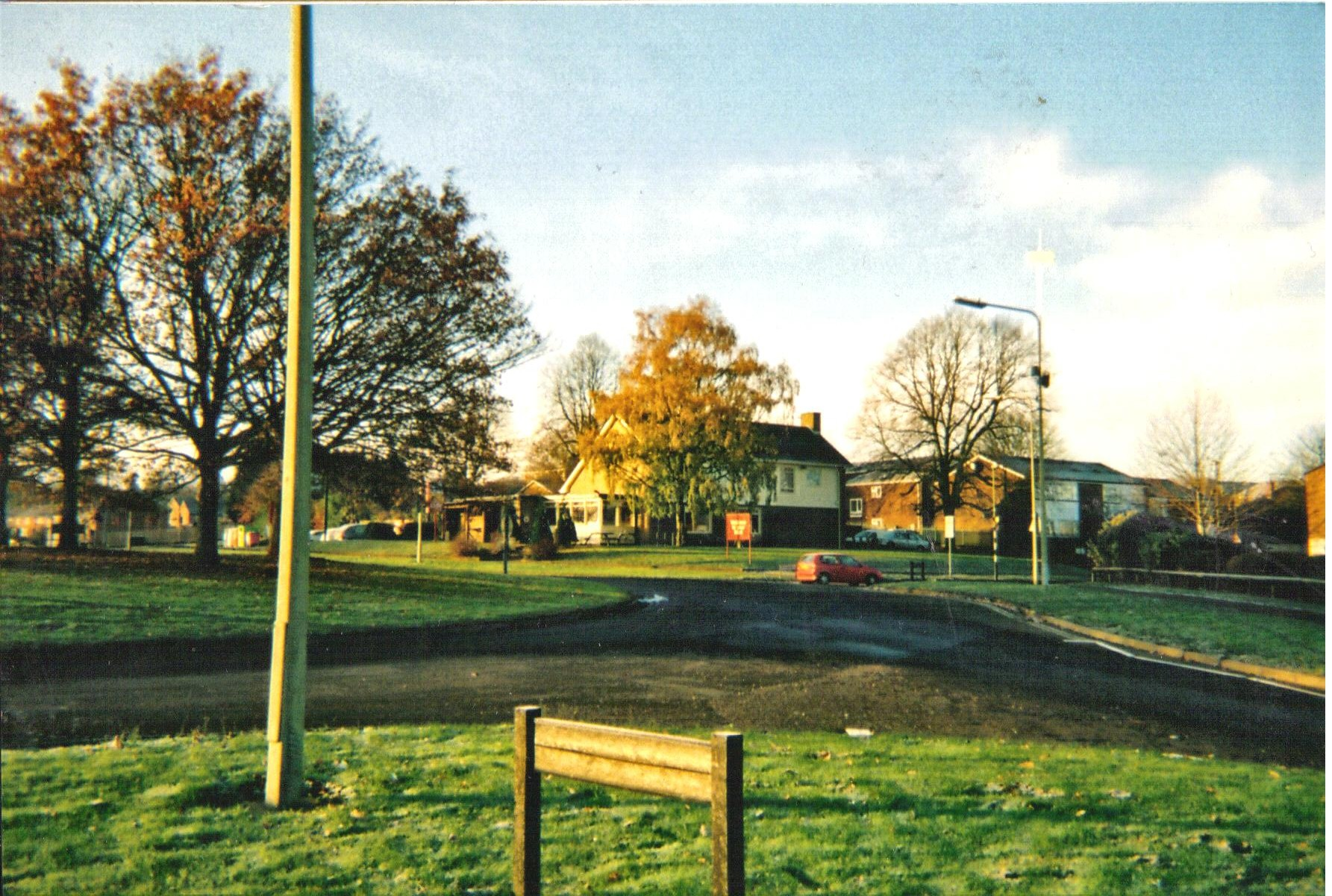
The Admiral Holland Pub in Banbury in 2010

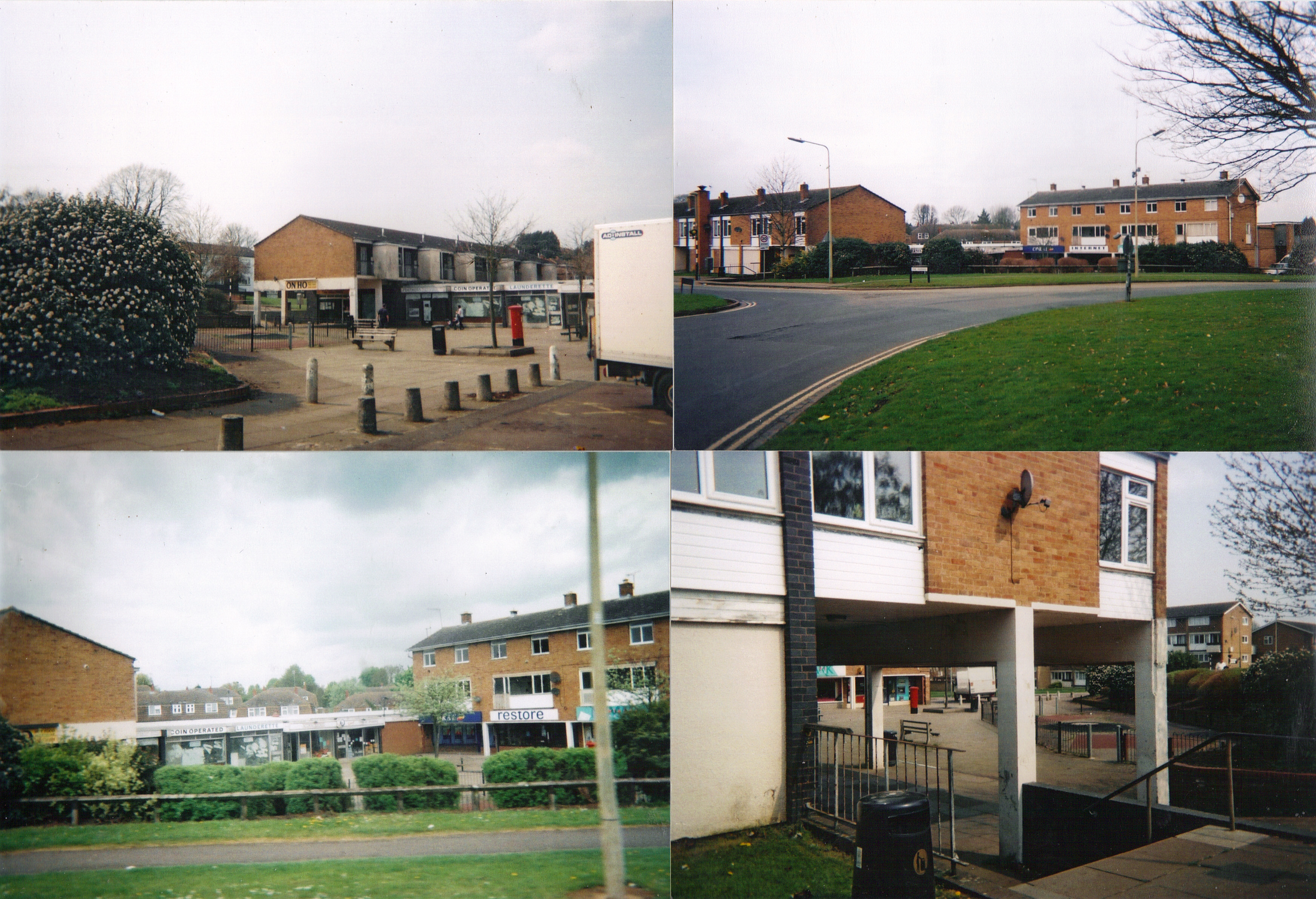
The Woodgreen shopping arcade in 2010. It was built in 1961 and was scheduled to be redeveloped in 2012 or 2013. The fenced off part with the black and red concrete is where the former play park once stood.

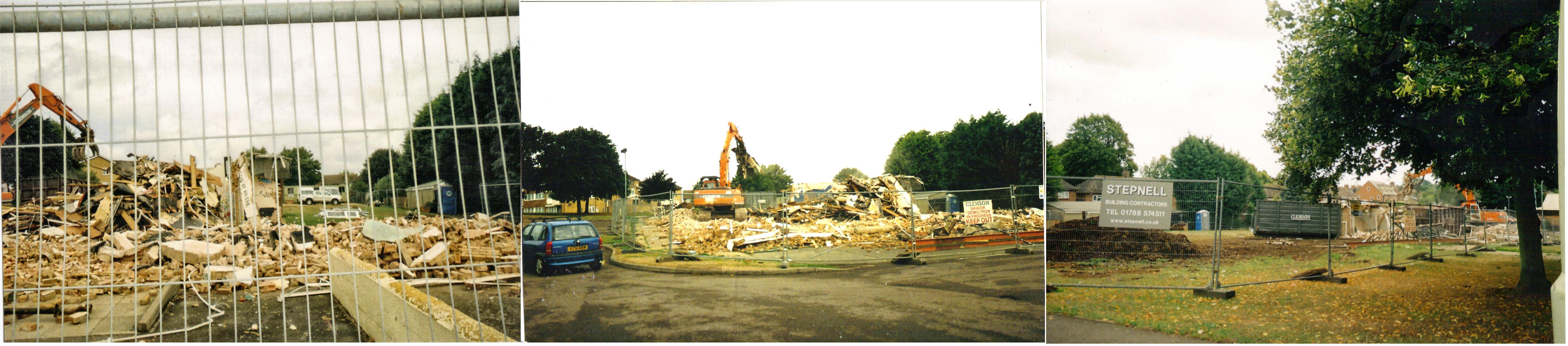
The demolition of the old 1964 Woodgreen youth club in late 2010

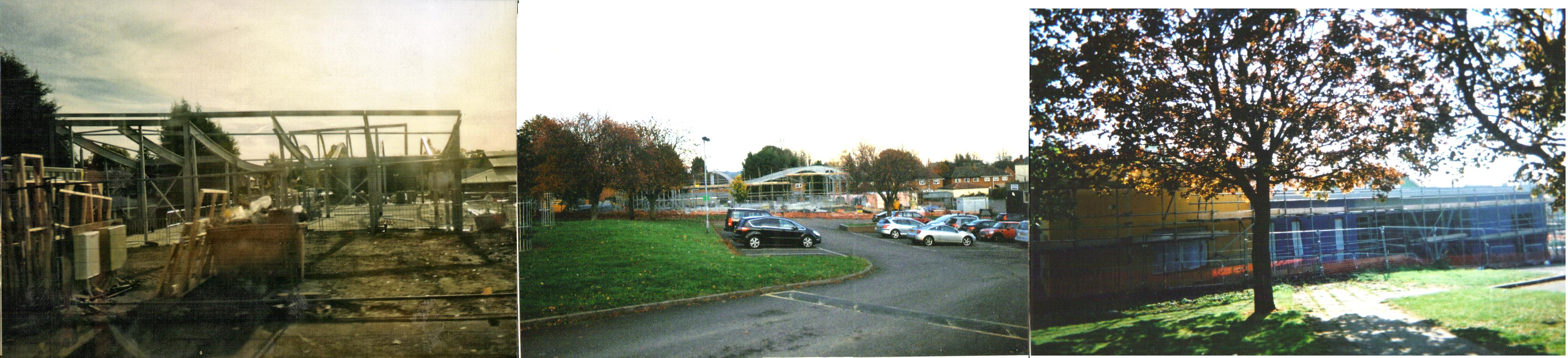
The building of the new Woodgreen youth club in late 2010 (left and centre) and early 2011 (right)

The Woodgreen estate lies in the intermediate area between the Neithrop and Bretch Hill housing estates and was built over the former Victorian village of Wood Green in the 1930s. The name 'Woodgreen' was hyphenated from 1927 to 1937, and merged by 1947. An Ordnance Survey map from 1882 reveals Park Road and part of Queen's road were partly built. Queen's road was completed by the 1900 map edition and King's road was mostly completed by the 1922 edition. Banbury's Woodgreen Youth Centre was built in 1964 and opened in 1965. It is situated in Woodgreen, next to both the Neithrop Library and the Woodgreen Leisure Centre. The low rise flats called Kennedy House were named after US President John F. Kennedy when they were built in the mid-1960s.

=== The Woodgreen swimming pool ===
The Woodgreen swimming pool was opened in early 1939 and renovated in the late 1970s. It was closed in the early 2000s, heavily renovated in 2009 and reopened in 2010. The much frequented outdoor pool is closed from September to March due to the bad seasonal weather.

=== The Admiral Holland pub ===
The Admiral Holland pub and the neighbouring houses were built circa 1960–1961. The pub was named after Vice-Admiral Lancelot Holland, who was in command of the British naval forces during the Battle of Denmark Strait in May 1941 against the German battleship Bismarck. He died aboard HMS Hood when attacking Bismarck in the Denmark Strait. The pub was demolished in 2017.

=== Recreational areas and parks ===
The Yellow Park was one of the smallest parks in Banbury. It is situated next to a youth centre on Hilton Road in the Neithrop ward. The park gets its name from the fact that the slide, monkey bars and climbing frame are all yellow. It also has swings inside the play area. There is also a small field in the park measuring approximately 2000 m^{2}. It was destroyed when the youth centre was expanded in 2010.

The Woodgreen Arcade play park 52.063267°N 1.352726°W (approx.) was a minor play park by the Woodgreen Arcade. It was removed in 2006 after youths set the two spring riders on fire in 2002. This along with the general increase in vandalism and litter lead to the park's closure. The charred spring riders, the bench and the small roundabout were removed at this date. It was later tarmacked over and public access restored a short while later. The sizeable Stanbridge Park is roughly two-thirds the size of Princess Diana Park and contains the Stanbridge Children's Play Park and a netball court. It runs between Bretch Hill and Woodgreen.

==== Recent crimes and anti-social behaviour ====
St. Louis Meadow park area was set for an £80,000 refurbishment on 3 September 2010. A plastic pay tunnel, some low wooden fencing, wood chippings, two cargo nets, a spring rider and a wooden climbing frame were added. At about 10.15pm on 9 February, fire fighters were called to the play area in St. Louis Meadow park, after a member of public reported a fire inside the play area. A plastic tunnel had been deliberately burnt by local youths. It will take £85,000 to repair the devastated park.

This tragically mirrored an event in the Spiceball park that caused heavy damage on 8 February 2007, but did not deter the council from doing its planned £90,000 and the 2006 arson of two spring riders that led to the closure of the Woodgreen Arcade play park in mid-2006. There were some concerns over antisocial behaviour and heavier than average litter levels in Princess Diana Park and Hillview Park, and that fly-tipping in Banbury also affects some streets and footpaths such as on the Ironstones' paths.

=== Local redevelopment plans ===
Woodgreen's 45-year-old youth club was closed in April 2010, demolished during July 2010, and its replacement was due to open in early 2011. The redevelopment plan was valued at £3,000,000. The small shopping complex, called the Woodgreen Arcade, which includes a Chinese takeaway shop, chemists and a popular convenience shop, is on the opposite side of the road to the Admiral Holland pub. It was built in the early 1960s and was slated for redevelopment in 2010, unlike the similarly aged pub.

== Bretch Hill ==
=== History ===
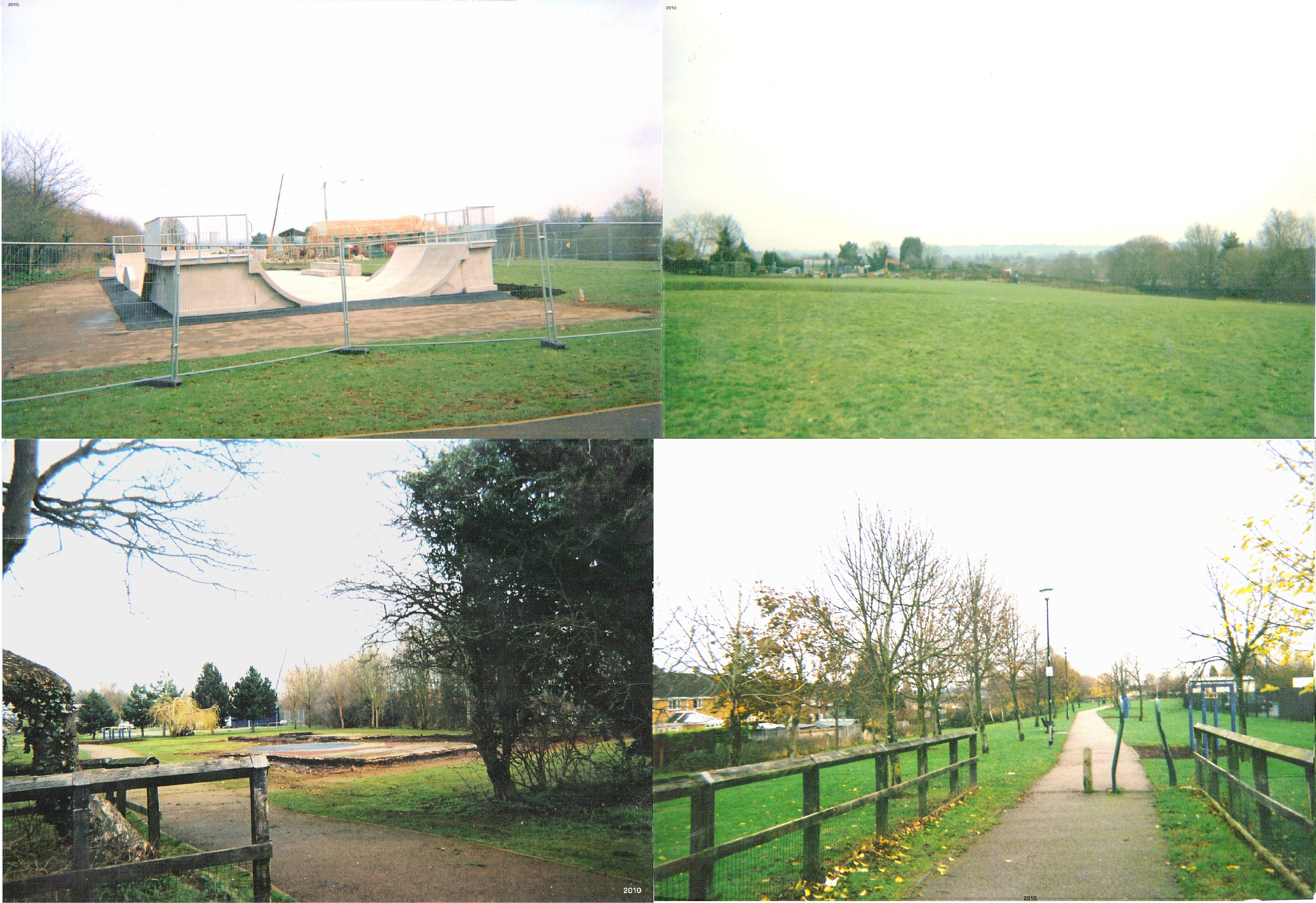
Princess Diana Park, and the adjoining 'wheeled activity' park's roller-skating arch facility in Banbury's Bretch Hill estate during 2010

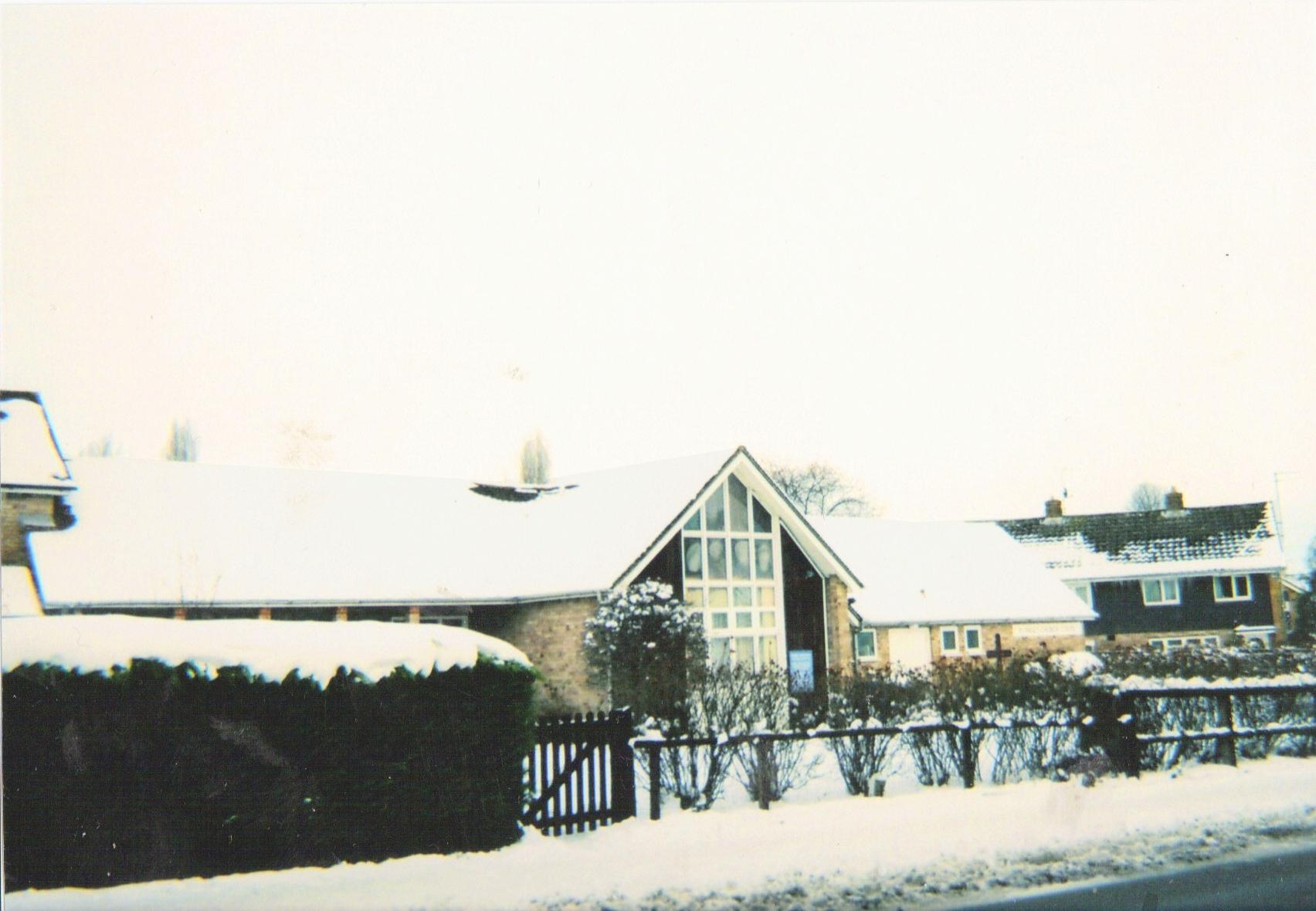
St. Pauls Church, Neithrop, Banbury, Oxfordshire in 2010

Bretch Hill is a housing estate in the Neithrop ward of Banbury, Oxfordshire. It was formerly a council estate, but today many of its houses are owner-occupied and the remainder are owned by a housing association.

Only a couple of farms and the Neithrop Guardens orchards stood in the unspoiled countryside until the 1940s. Wythicome Drive was built in 1947, but development then slowed and re-focused on Woodgreen. Most of the streets' first inhabitants were from Banbury, London and Oxford. The estate was built in the 1960s because of the growth of the town due to the North London overspill and a slum clearance scheme in both Solihull and Coventry. It was expanded further in the north during the mid-1970s. The estate is also home to the large Princess Diana Park. The now derelict Bretch Farm, near Claypits Close, opened in about 1900, was expanded slightly in 1910, lost a large part of its land to the Bretch hill development (the watertower and communications transmissions mast) in the 1960s, closed in 1990 and has been derelict ever since. Trinity Close and Powys Grove were originally created as separate entities between the late 1960s and early 1980s. Claypits Close was built circa 2007 and named after the old clay pit it was built on. There were many small, Victorian clay pits and kilns in the south west of Banbury, but they had closed by the 1920s.

=== The Bradley Arcade ===
The Bradley Arcade shopping centre was built circa 1965 and named after police inspector James Roy Bradley, who was deliberately run down and killed by wanted criminals at a local police road block in 1967.

=== The Willy Freund Centre ===
The Willy Freund Centre closed in 2004 due to a funding crisis and increasing teenage rowdiness. It was reopened in September 2010, after a six-month period of heavy renovation work. Prior to 2004 and since reopening it is the local youth centre.

=== Schools ===
Bretch Hill is served by four schools:

- William Morris School (primary)
- Orchard Fields Community School (primary)
- St. Joseph's Roman Catholic Primary School (Catholic primary school).
- North Oxfordshire Academy (secondary)

=== Recreational areas and parks ===
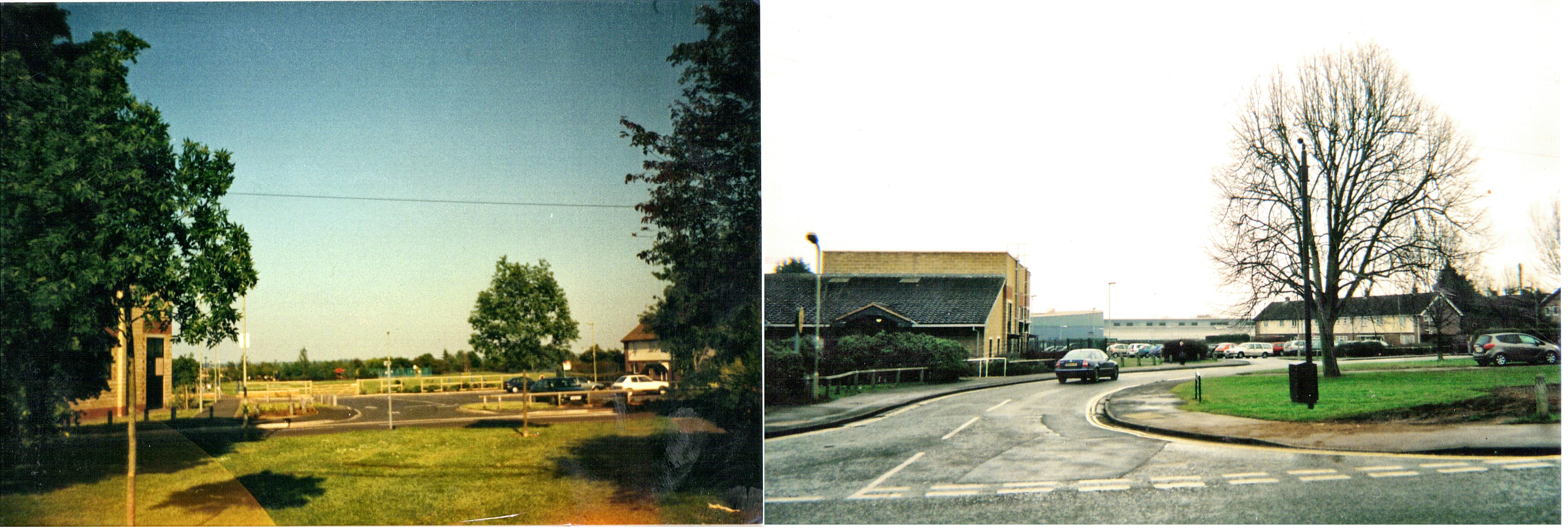
The later Orchard fields school and Princess Diana park in 2005 and 2010

- The Princess Diana Park is a large park situated between Prescott Close and Edmunds Road in the Bretch Hill estate of Banbury, neighbouring Orchard Fields Community School. It has many facilities including monkey bars, swings, football pitches and basketball courts. It measures approx 40,000m^{2}. The 30-year-old Princess Diana Park was upgraded and gained a 'Wheeled activity' park with a concrete roller-skating arch during 2010.
- The Hastings Park is a large (about a quarter} size of Spiceball) park in the Bretch Hill estate of Banbury. It has two small zip wire swings, a large field and two large hills near the middle as well as swings and the small Rugrats Play Park children's playground. The roundabout was removed from the concrete area near the entrance at Chester Avenue after an accident in 1999.
- The Bretch Hill and Dover Avenue children's play park is one of the smallest parks in Banbury, but is well equipped with a pair of swings, seats and a small slide. The bushy park measures about 25m^{2}. It is on land adjoining the Willy Freund Centre.
- The sizeable Stanbridge Park is roughly two-thirds the size of Princess Diana Park and contains the Stanbridge Children's Play Park and a netball court. It runs between Bretch Hill and Woodgreen.
- The Balmoral Rise Park is a small park on the edge of town and contains seating and the Balmoral Rise Children's Play Park.
- The Sandford Green is a small, tree covered, park between Wythicombe Drive and Bretch Hill Road.

There were some concerns over anti-social behaviour and heavier than average litter levels in Princess Diana Park and Hillview Park and that fly-tipping in Banbury also affects some streets and footpaths such as on the Ironstones' paths.

=== Planned expansion ===
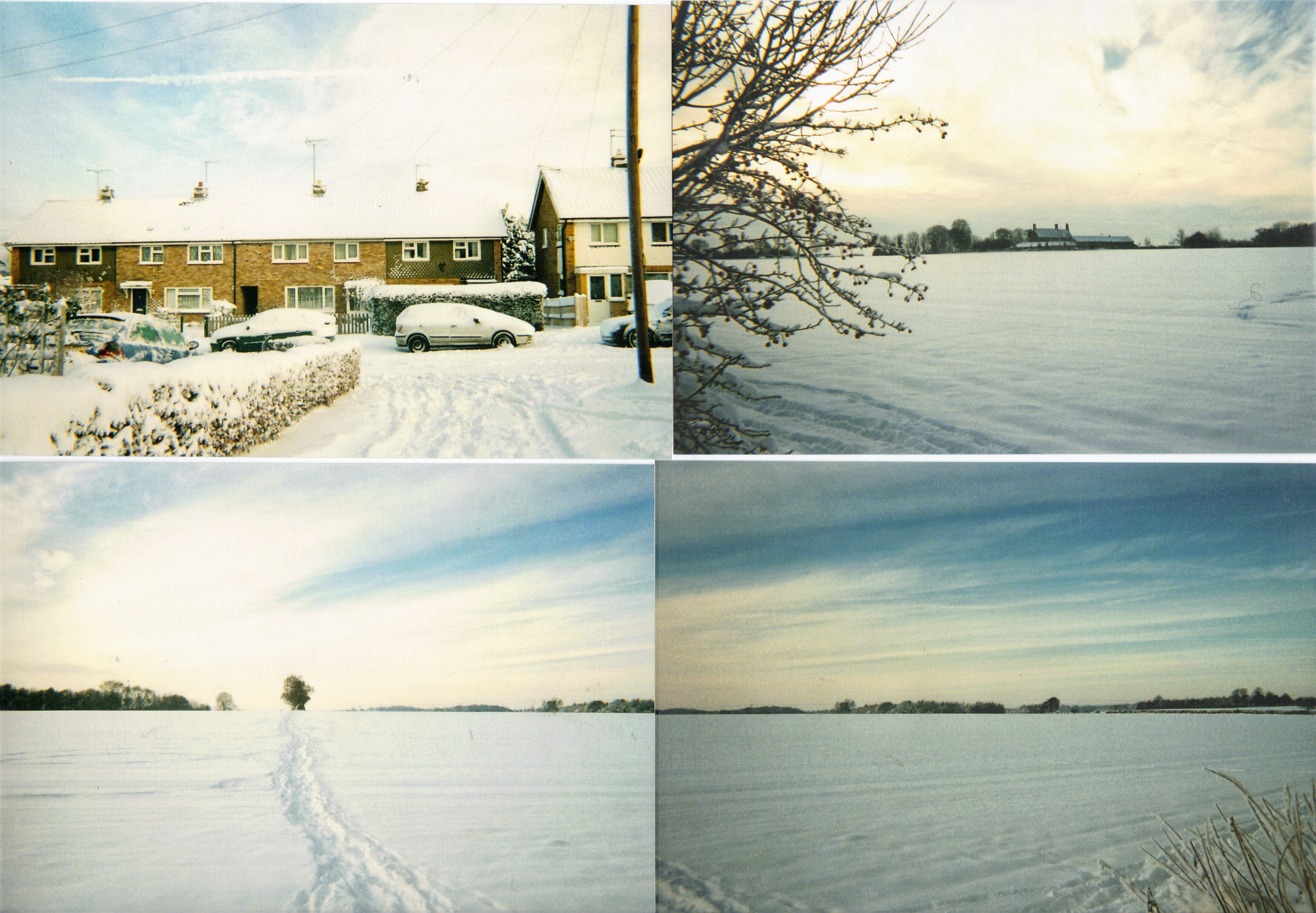
Neithrop in December 2010. Three of the images are of the farm land behind Dover Avenue and Edinbourgh Way that was slated for a new housing estate between 2006 and 2010.

A plan existed in the late 2000s to expand the Bretchill estate west, into the local farmland, but this has now been suspended due to the credit crunch and local hostility to the plan, like the southern expansion towards Bodicote.

In February 2006 Cherwell District Council voted to proceed with the plans despite the popular opposition and local campaigning against it. About 2,000 houses will be built in the estate, which will include local shops, a post office, a school and other local services. The more popular, and upmarket Hanwell Fields Estate was built in the north during 2008 and 2009. It was meant to bring affordable social housing to the west and south of Banbury, while providing for more upmarket housing in the Hanwell fields area.

== Trinity Close and Powys Grove ==
=== History ===
Whilst they are officially part of the Bretch Hill estate, they were originally created as separate entities in the late 1960s to early 1970s and mid-1970s to early 1980s respectively. Trinity Close was mostly built between 1973 and 1975. Powys Grove is near the Barley Mow Pub and Trinity Close is opposite the North Oxfordshire Academy school. The Bretch Hill Road may have remained a long cul-de-sac not reached the main road near the Drayton School or have had Appelby and Penrith Closes added to it, if the long planned Banbury by-pass had gone ahead in the early to mid-1980s. Since then there has been much redevelopment work done, with the demolition of the old lock-up garages between Appleby Close and Edinburgh Close making way for a car park and a small housing development.

=== Schools ===
There are none. Most pupils go to either William Morris School or the North Oxfordshire Academy, the latter being built in the 1970s.

=== Recreational areas and parks ===
- The Trinity Close Park and children's play park is roughly two-thirds the size of Princess Diana Park and contains the Trinity Close Play Park and a netball court.
- The Powys Grove Park is a small park on the edge of town a short way from the Barley Mow Pub.

== Transport ==
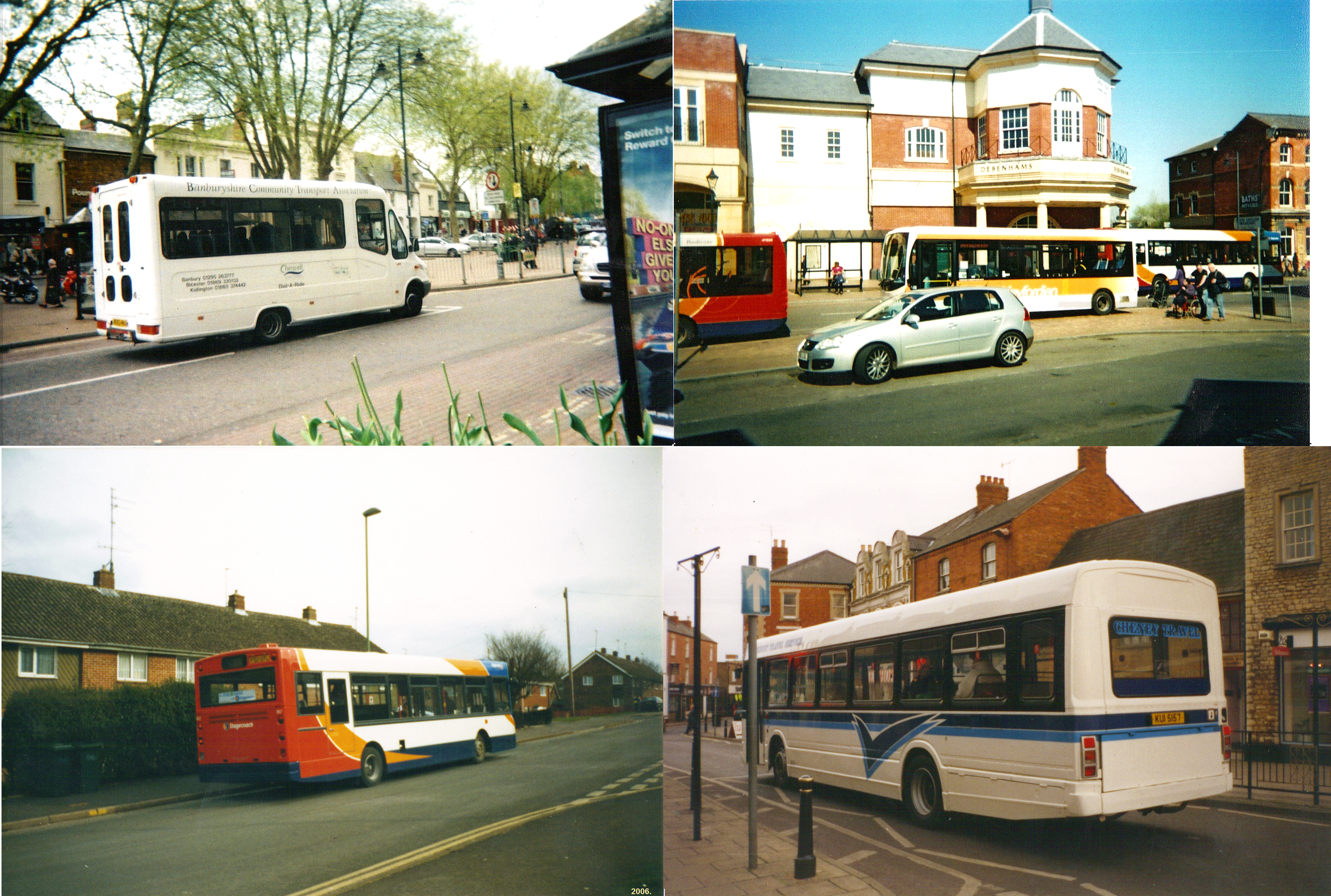
A former Cheney Coaches bus, a Heyfordian bus, a Stagecoach bus and a Banburyshire Community Transport Association (BCTA) bus in Banbury. The Stagecoach buses ran every 15 minutes on weekdays and every 20 minutes at weekends as of 2008 and the Heyfordian bus runs every 30 minutes, except on Sundays as of 2009.

The local bus services in Banbury town centre radiate out to the various estates. Those to Bretch Hill, Woodgreen, and Hardwick are run by the Stagecoach Oxfordshire bus company. Heyfordian Travel also run a service via the Poets' Corner estate and The Link. Cheney Coaches also ran a service that ran parallel to most of the Stagecoach routes between 1996 and 2004. Traffic congestion is problematic around The Shires crossroads and by Banbury Cross. It is also sometimes a problem in Orchard Way and outside the Admiral Holland pub.

== Local politics ==
The Neithrop ward is traditionally a Labour ward but for the first time, during the 2006 local elections for Cherwell District Council, the ward changed to one Labour councillor and one Conservative Party councillor. The traditionally present Green party candidate lost in 2006. The Greens have been present in the ward since the early 1990s. Labour still holds control for the Neithrop ward for the Banbury Town Council and Oxfordshire County Council. The Liberal Democrats, UKIP or British National Party fielded no candidate in the ward during 2006. A lone Liberal Democrat ran in the Hardwick estate only.

== See also ==
- History of Banbury, Oxfordshire
