= Easington, Cherwell =

Area of Banbury, Oxfordshire, England

Coordinates: 52.052°N 1.345°W

Easington
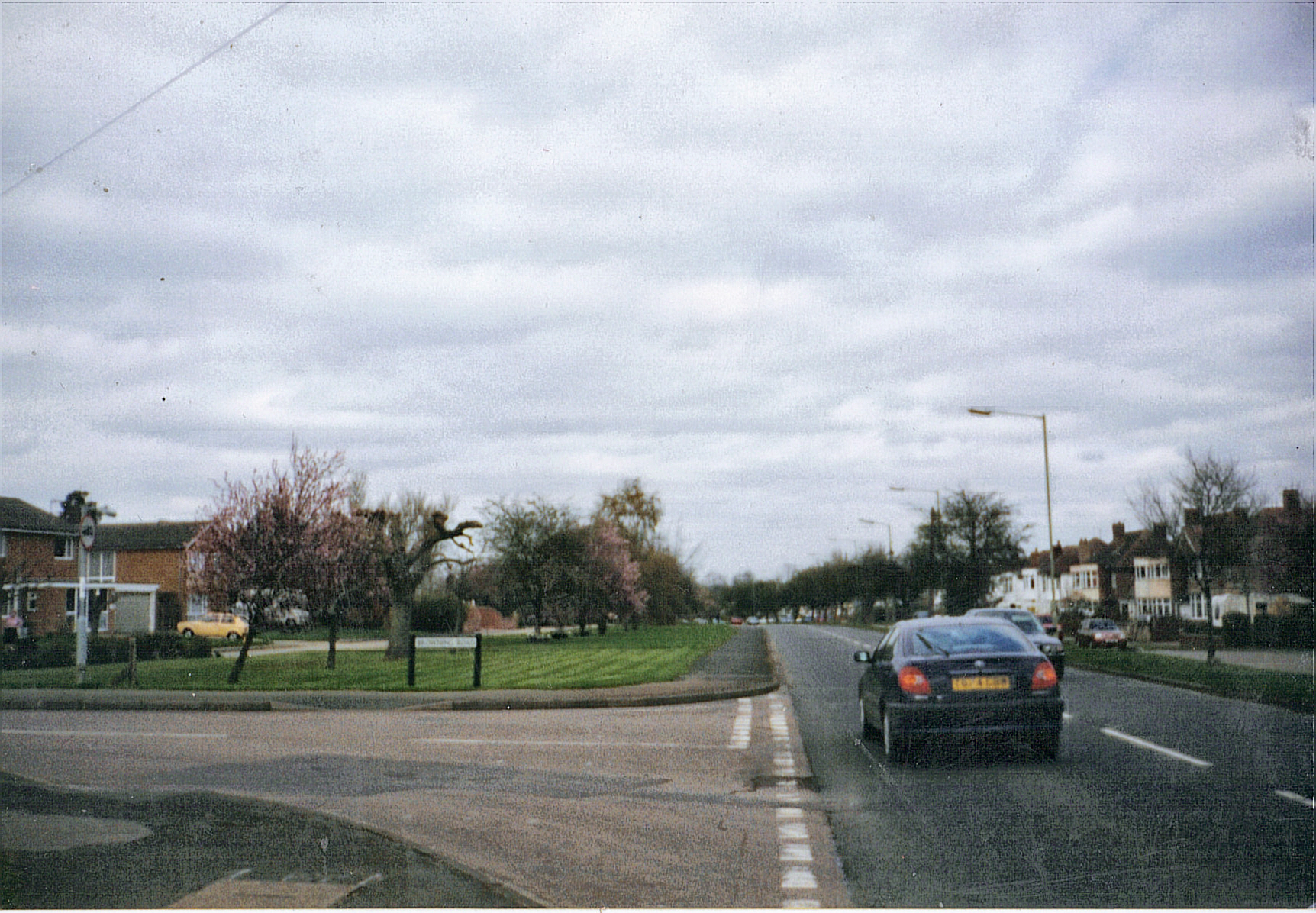
- A street in the Easington estate in Banbury in 2001

- Location within Oxfordshire
- Civil parish: Banbury
- District: Cherwell
- Shire county: Oxfordshire
- Region: South East
- Country: England
- Sovereign state: United Kingdom

Easington, Poets Corner and the Timms estate are three interconnecting estates in the town of Banbury, in the civil parish of Banbury, in the Cherwell district, in the county of Oxfordshire, England.

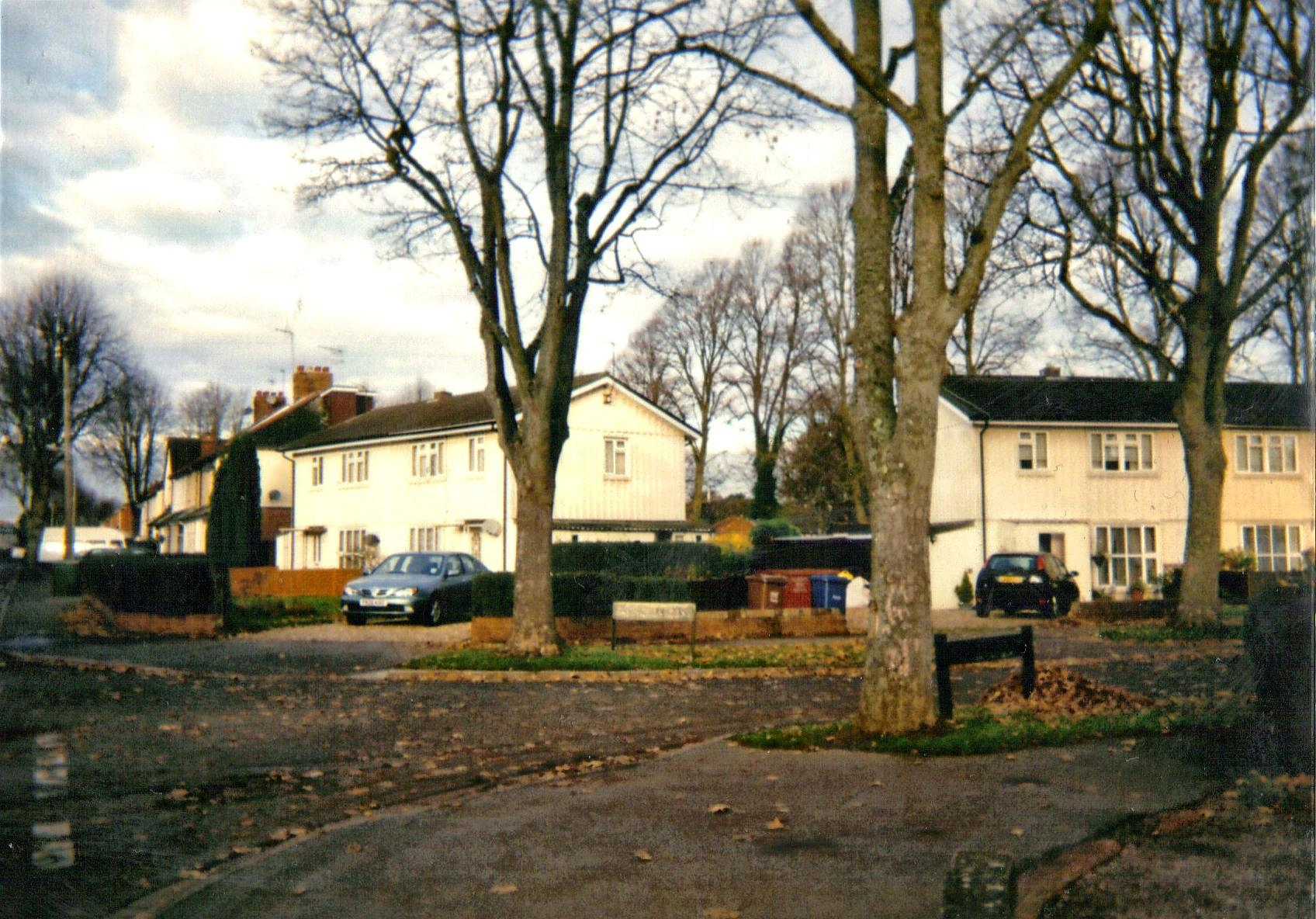
Easington Close, Banbury in 2010. It was built in 1947.

== History ==
=== Easington proper ===
Easington is a ward and former Medieval village in the south-west of the market town of Banbury. Easington, which was a rural estate attached to the former Calthorpe Manor, was first mentioned in 1279. Its demesne lands were subsequently leased out over the years.

In 1505 the Easington estate was leased out for a rent fee for 15 years to Anne, the relict of the lord, Sir William Danvers and after her death in 1520 a new lease for 40 years was made to the local mercer, William Pierson. Laurence Pierson was a farmer of Easington from 1540 to 1541 and by 1545 the lease had finally passed to John Crocker of Hook Norton; his son-in-law Edward Hawten used it for a rent. The Bishop of Lincoln's vast Banbury estate, except for Neithrop and Calthorpe, was sold to the Duke of Somerset in 1547, but by 1550 he granted it (except for Hardwick) to John Dudley, Earl of Warwick, then the Duke of Northumberland shortly afterward, who in 1551 granted it to the Crown in exchange for other lands. After 1551 the lordship of Easington seems to have remained with the Crown as no one took up the rent or apparently owned the letting rights.

The Barber family were local landlords, who let out their Easington estate's lands. By 1728, the Berrymoor lands were leased along with the first Berrymoor Farm to the same owner. As of 1734, a large portion of the estate (including Easington Farm) was leased to a local man, and in 1787 the whole lease lands of the adjacent Farm field and several village closes were included in the deal from 1799 onwards. The Barber family's property in Easington was thus farmed as a whole by successive tenants until late Victorian times. The longstanding Easington Farm's buildings was extensively repaired and enlarged in 1793 by the then lease holder.

Banbury town council built the houses in King's Road and on the Easington estate. Other working-class type houses were built at the south end of Britannia Road and the area to the east between 1881 and 1930. Houses were also built in both Old Grimsbury Road and Gibbs Road in Grimsbury. More up-market houses were built in both the Marlborough Road area and in Bath Road, Kings Road, Park Road, and Queen Street in Neithrop. Ordnance Survey maps from 1882, 1900 and 1922 show that the houses on Broughton Road are built over an old claypit called the Bear pit. Berrymoor farm, whose last land lease was of mid-Victorian origin, had become a laundrette by 1922 and had lost two outhouses, but gained a small annex to the main building.

The Housing, Town Planning, &c. Act 1919 was followed by the building of the Easington housing estate of 361 council houses in what was one of the first slum clearance schemes in the country. By 1930 the medical officer reported 131 Banbury town centre houses unfit for habitation. Therefore, in 1933, Banbury council opened the Ruscote housing estate of 160 houses. The increased population between 1931 and 1949 was accommodated by the expansion of the town in three main areas, of which houses were built both by the town corporation and by private housebuilders. Most of the estate was built in the 1930s and 1940s as local industry began to grow, with a large expansion in the early 1960s, due to the London overspill.

The land south of the Foscote Private Hospital in Calthorpe, Oxfordshire and Easington farm were mostly open farmland until the early 1960s. It had only a few farmsteads, the odd house, an allotment field (now under the Sainsbury's store), and the Municipal Borough of Banbury council's small reservoir. Berrymoor farm was finally demolished in 2004 and became St. Mary's View. Much of the farm land was used to build a children's day-care, an industrial storage facility, a small electrical substation, and a branch of De Montfort University (now a branch of the Oxford and Cherwell College) in the late 1960s.

=== The Timms and Poets Corner estates ===
Two minor streams once ran from a spring near the allotment gardens and the land under today's Timms estate. An old clay pit, kiln and brick works lay near the Poets Corner estate. The pit was of mid-Victorian origin and the buildings were put up. The pit had been filled in by the 1920s, the buildings closed by the 1940s and the site built on by the late 1960s.

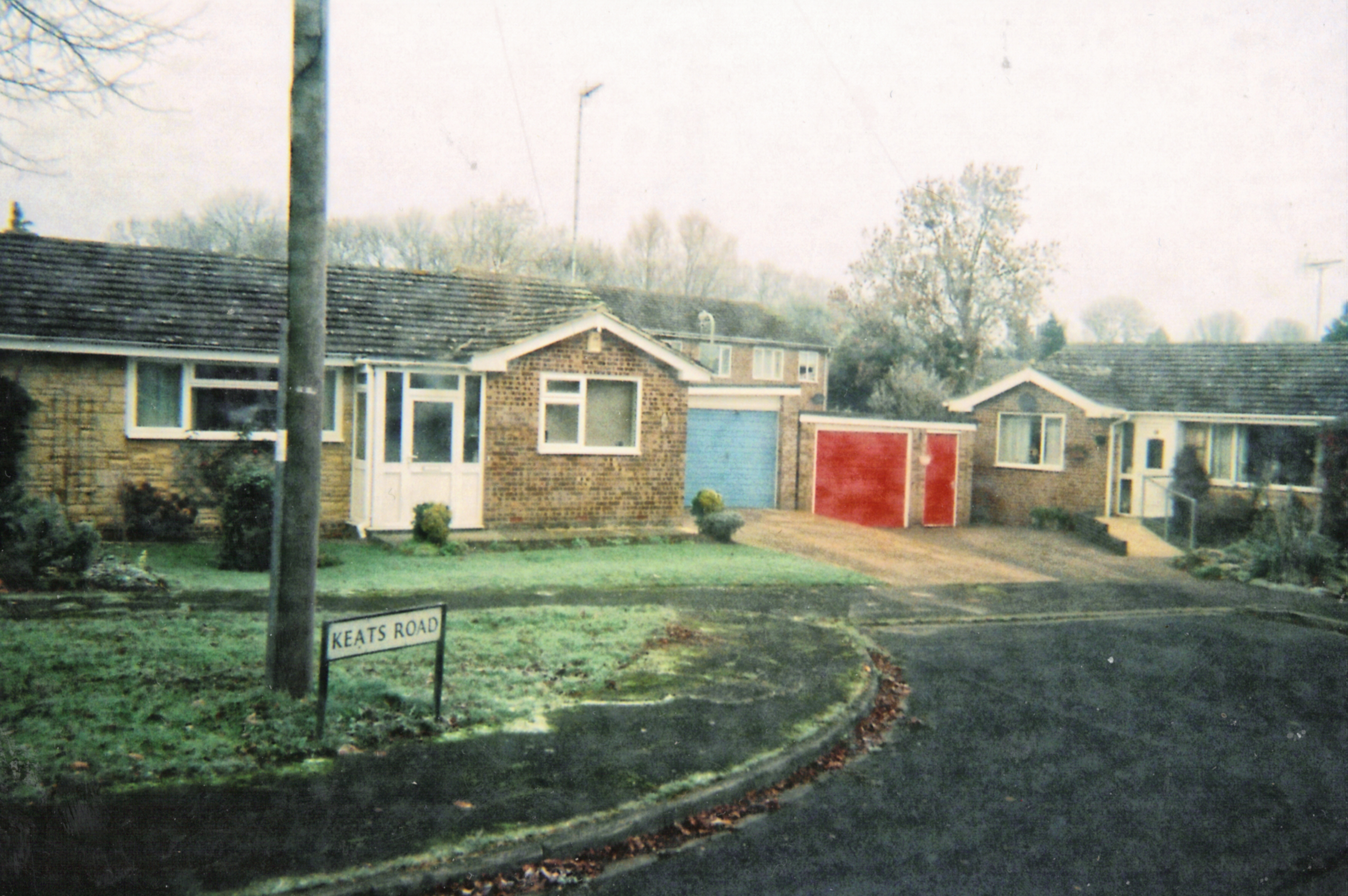
Keats Road on the Poets Corner estate, in 2010

The Timms estate and Poets Corner estate were built in the late 1950s and early 1960s respectively. Poets Corner actually covers the site of an old sporting rifle range, which went out of use when the army left just after the Second World War. The Timms estate and Poets' Corner estates are also part of the ward which contains many new-style homes. The A361 and A4260 roads pass adjacent to the estate. The people living in the three estates are generally more upper class in orientation, higher up on the social ladder and tend to have professional or managerial rather than blue collar jobs. The Easington and Timms estate has only a few recent overseas immigrants, most of which are either Irish, Poles or Czechs. The Cherwell Heights and Poets Corner estates tend to slant towards South Africans, Brazilians and Irish.

== Local amenities ==
Easington has a public house called The Easington, some convenience shops and multiple other local amenities including a sports field. The Timms estate has some parks and a shopping complex, while the Poets Corner estate has a major park and a small convenience store.

== Local politics ==
Easington ward is customarily Conservative and stayed Conservative during the 2006 local elections for Cherwell District Council, but the ward had changed to one Labour councillor and one Conservative Party councillor in the previous election of 2002. The Green party candidate lost in 2006. The Conservatives still hold Easington ward for the Banbury Town Council and Oxfordshire County Council. The Liberal Democrats and UKIP fielded no candidates in the ward during 2006. A lone Liberal Democrat stood in the Hardwick estate only.

== Schools ==
Two of Banbury's biggest secondary schools and one primary school are in Easington:

- Banbury School
- Blessed George Napier Roman Catholic School
- Harriers Ground Primary School
- Queensway Primary School on Brantwood Rise

Banbury School is a mixed, multi-heritage, fully comprehensive school with 1650 students (including sixth form) situated on Ruskin Road, in the Easington ward of Banbury, Oxfordshire, England. The school is a specialist Humanities College.

== Sport and leisure ==
Easington has a non-League football team Easington Sports F.C. who play at Addison Road.

=== Recreational areas and parks ===
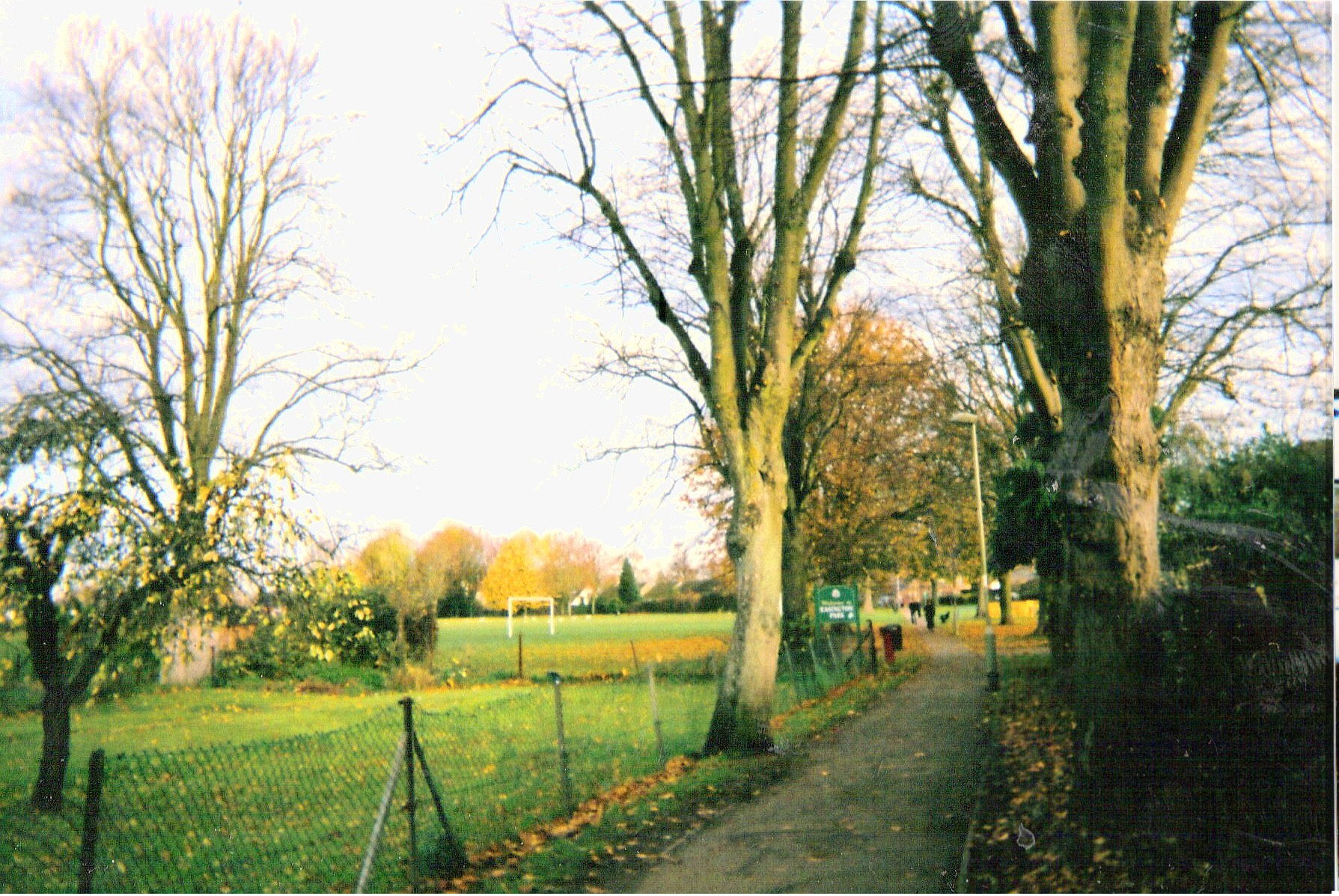
Easington Park, Banbury, Oxfordshire in 2010

- The Easington Recreation Ground is the estate's principal park and recreational area.
- The Browning Road Park and the well-resourced Browning Road Children's Play Area are about 1/3 the size of Easington Recreation Ground and is the main park and children's play area in Poets Corner. It is rather prone to winter flooding since a spring and minor stream was poorly culverted there in the early 1970s.
- The Brantwood Rise Park is a small piece of parkland in the Poets Corner estate. It is fenced in by residents' gardens' fences, save for the small lane running through it. It is merely approximately 25 ft x 12 ft. It has 1 bin, 5 trees and a bench. The kids' swing was removed in 2004, due to vandalism.

There are also 2 minor play parks and one minor park, the biggest of these being on the Timms estate, by the local shopping complex.

== Transport ==
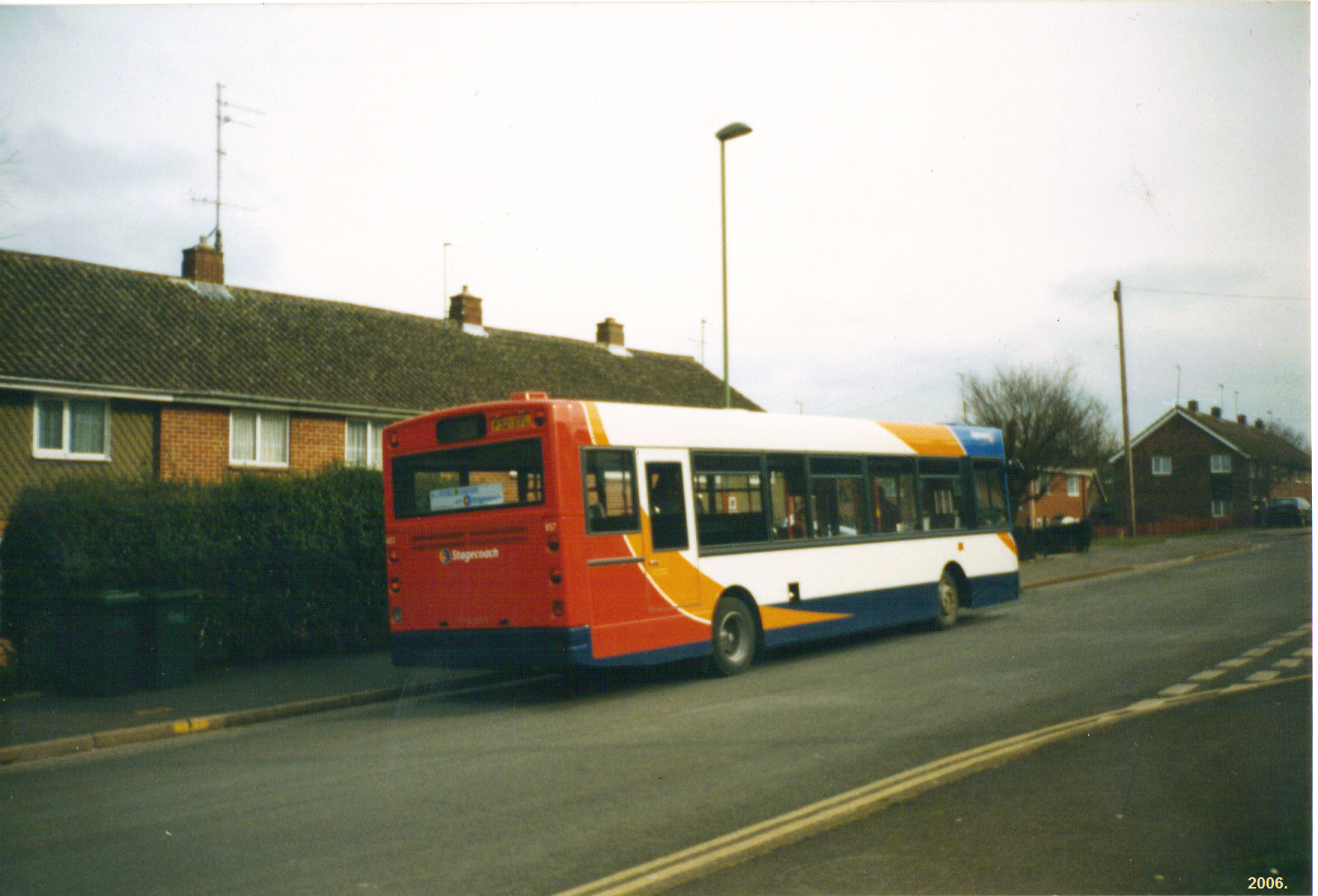
A Stagecoach bus in Bretch Hill in 2006

The local bus services to Banbury town centre via Calthorpe and the Timms estate are run by the Stagecoach Oxfordshire bus company. Heyfordian Travel buses also run a limited service on weekdays to the Timms estate and on weekdays and Saturdays to PoetsCorner via Bretch Hill.

== Gallery ==
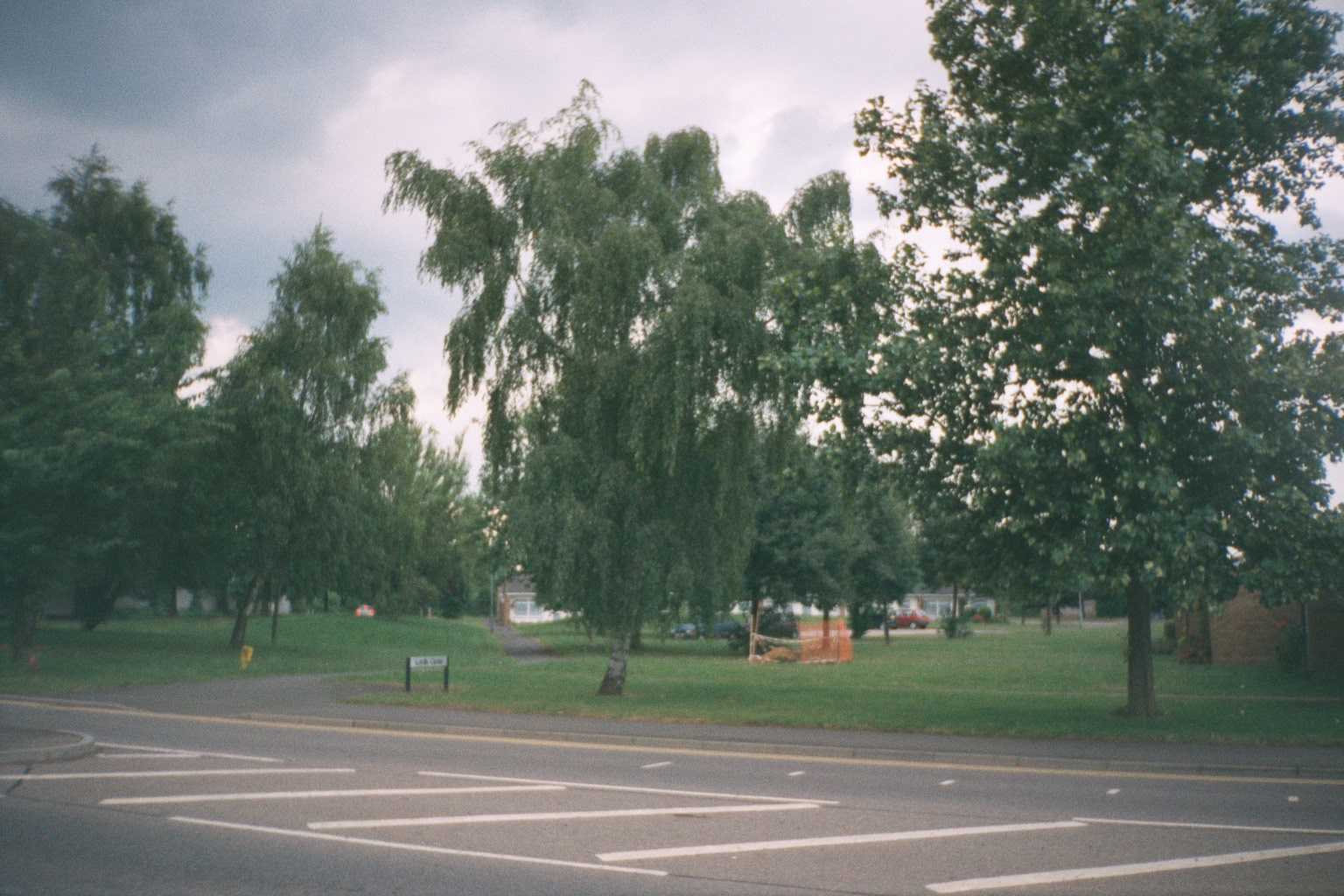
A park in Easington estate, Banbury, in 2001

== See also ==
- History of Banbury, Oxfordshire
- Banburyshire
