= Ruscote =

Estate in Oxfordshire, England

Coordinates: 52.060°N 1.36°W

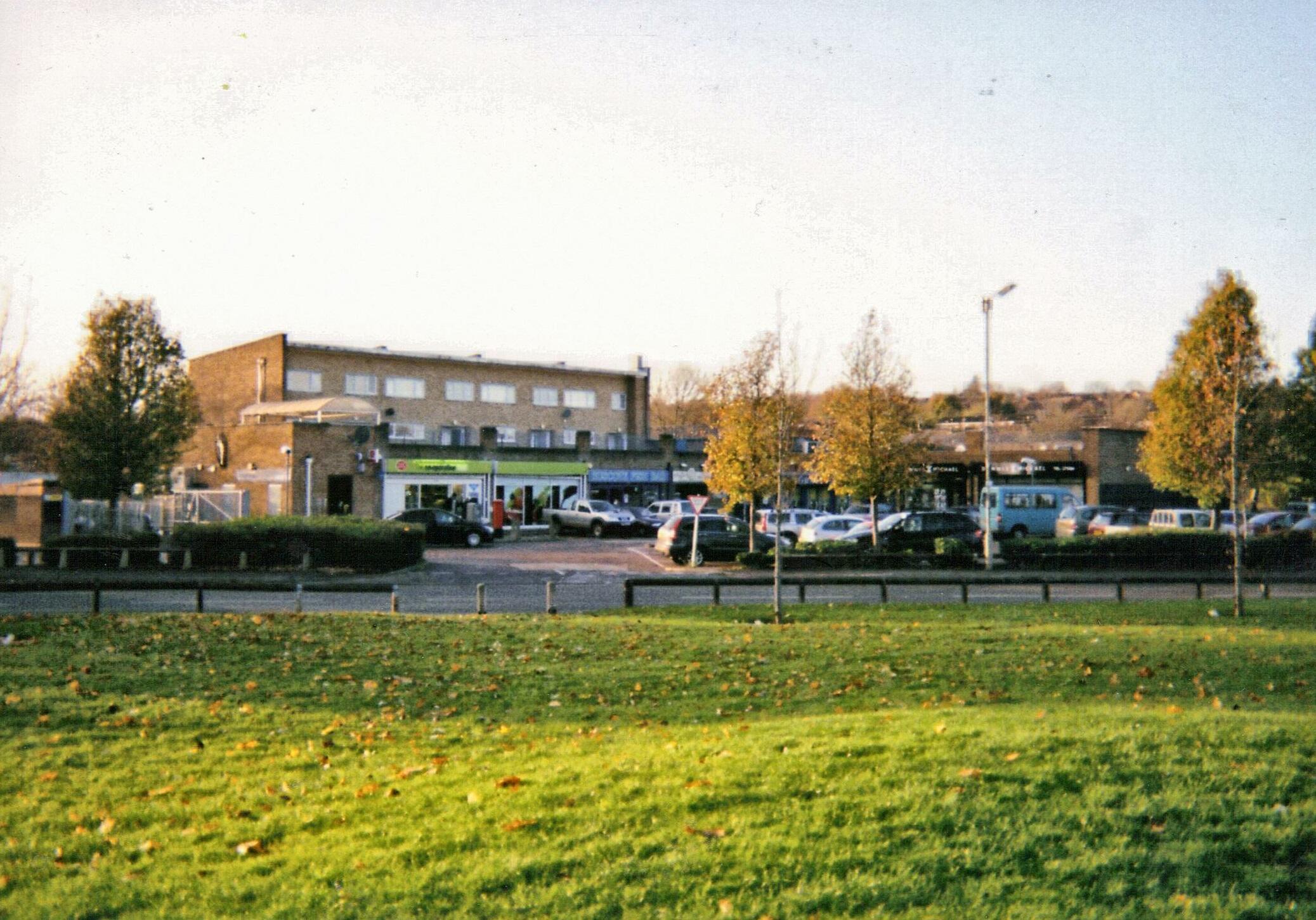
The Ruscote arcade, Banbury, in 2010. The view is from the park near the Aldi store, facing the local Co-Op store.

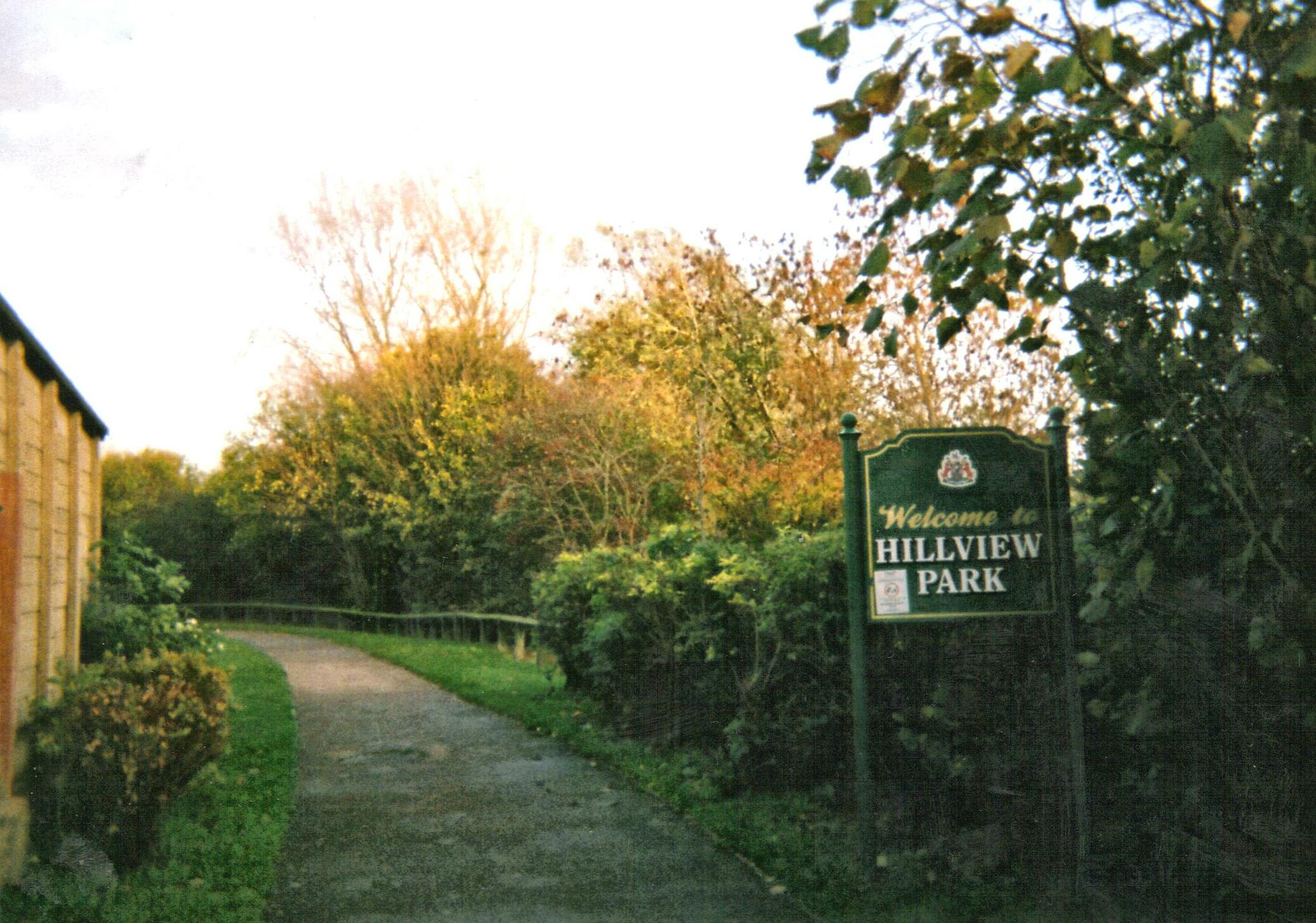
One of the entrances to Banbury's Hillview park in 2010

The Ruscote, Hardwick and Hanwell Fields estates are three interconnecting Banbury estates that were built between the 1930s and 2000s in Oxfordshire, England.

== History ==
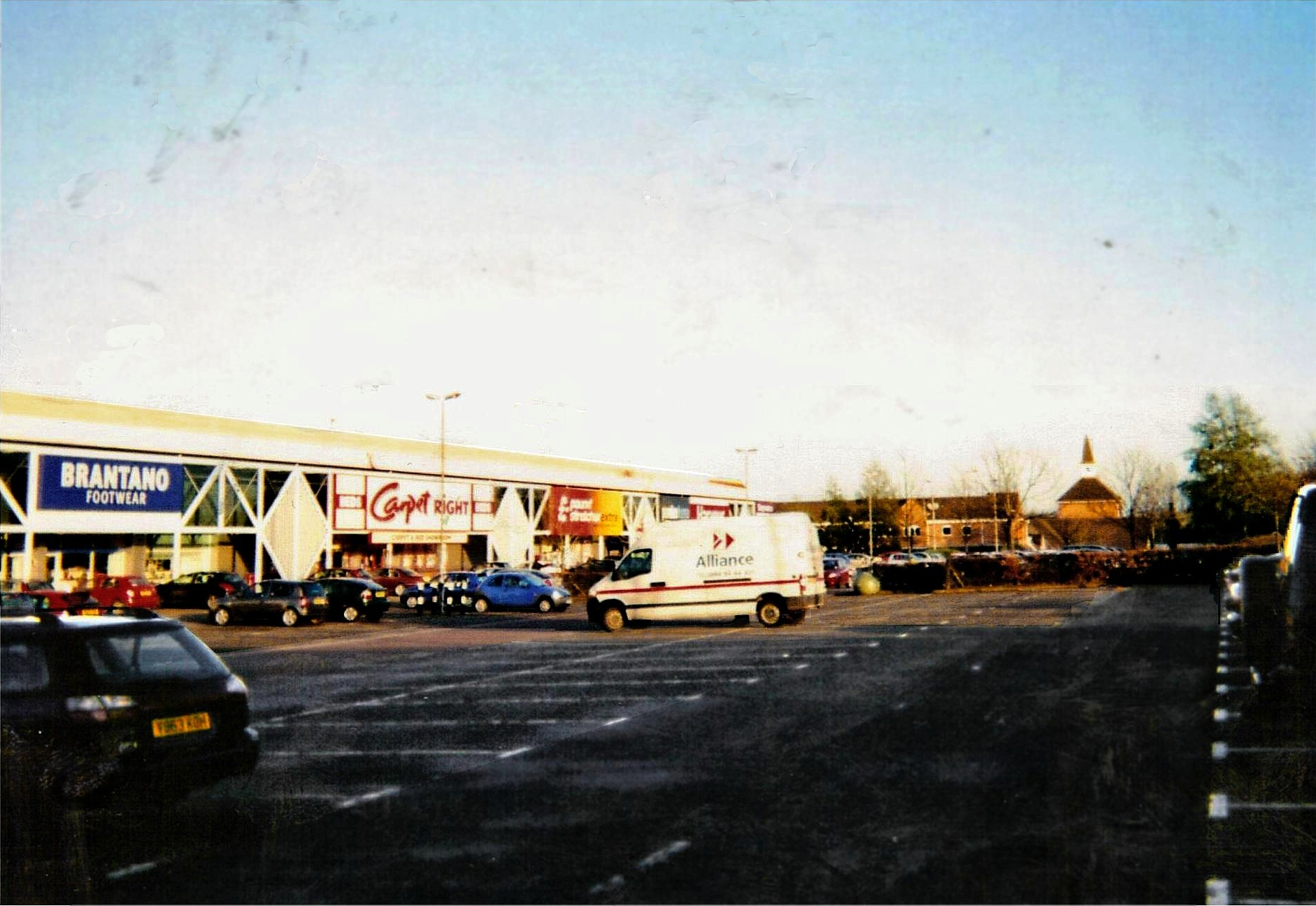
The Lockheed Drive retail estate/Banbury Cross Retail Park in Banbury has been a major employer since the 1980s.

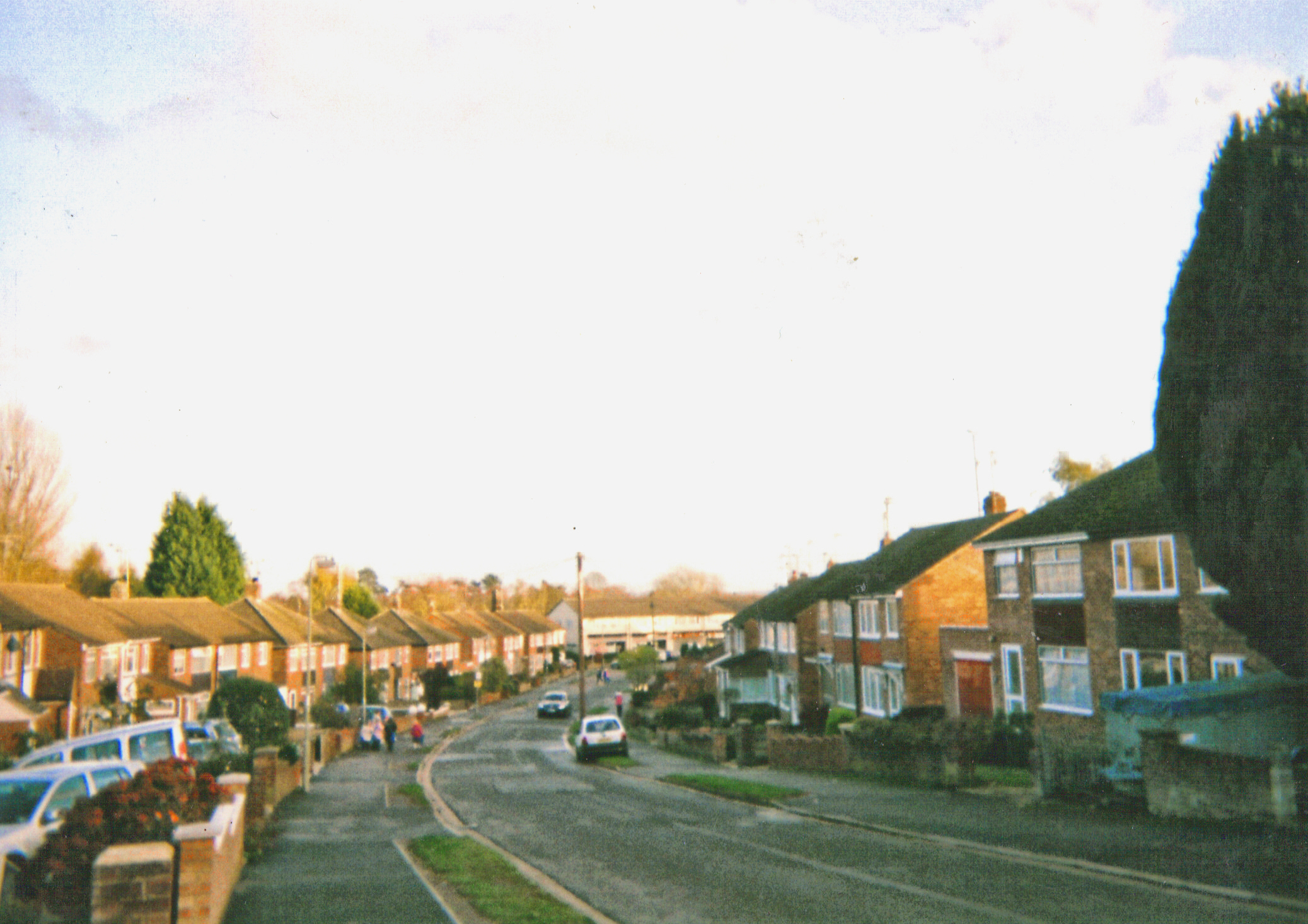
Ruscote in 2009, with the Hillview arcade shopping complex in the far distance

During excavations for the building of an office in Hennef Way in 2002, the remains of a British Iron Age settlement with circular buildings dating back to 200 BC were found. The site contained around 150 pieces of pottery and stone. Later there was a Roman villa at nearby Wykham Park. A small drinking-water reservoir lies to the north of Hennef way. The major road was named after Hennef in Germany.

Ruscote was a local village, that dated back to the 15th century, but did not develop until the late 19th century. It was formally incorporated into the borough of Banbury in 1889.

The Housing, Town Planning, &c. Act 1919 was followed by the building of the Easington housing estate of 361 council houses in what was one of the first slum clearance schemes in the country. By 1930 the medical officer reported 131 Banbury town centre houses unfit for habitation. So in 1933 Banbury council opened the Ruscote housing estate of 160 houses. The heavy increase in population between 1931 and 1949 was accommodated by the expansion of the town in three main areas, in each of which houses were built both by the town corporation and by housing private companies. The three areas were between the Oxford and Bloxham roads, where about 500 houses were built before 1939 to form the bulk suburb of Easington; in the area of the older village and suburb of Neithrop, where before 1939 some 500 houses were built both around the earlier houses and further west in new streets on either side of the Warwick road, a development which was extended to the south-west after 1945. In 1933 Banbury council opened the Ruscote housing estate of 160 houses, for working-class families.

The estate, which now has a notable South Asian community, was expanded in the 1950s because of the growth of the town due to the London overspill and further grew in the mid-1960s.

== Industry and commerce ==
The Oxfordshire Ironstone Railway (OIR) was opened between 1917 and 1919, was closed in 1967 and the line was lifted between 1967 and 1968. It was a major employer in Banbury for many of those years.

The mid-1950s the council established the Southam Road Industrial Estate which was successful in bringing a wide range of industries to the town. The most important newcomer was General Foods Ltd, formerly Alfred Bird & Sons (now Kraft Foods), which produced convenience foods. The plant was built between 1964 and 1965 and the company moved to Banbury from Birmingham in 1965. General Foods received active political and fiscal co-operation from the council to partly help find jobs for the local London overspill population. Kraft Foods Banbury is the Kraft centre of manufacturing in Britain, with the Kraft UK headquarters located at Cheltenham. A new factory with an 80,000 square feet (7,400 m^{2}) floor space was being constructed in 1969 for Encase Ltd and a factory was being built for Demag Hoists and Cranes Ltd., a subsidiary of Demag Zug, one of the world's largest manufacturers of lifting equipment. The industrial estate had become one of the 'economic epicentres' of the Banburyshire region by the early 1970s.

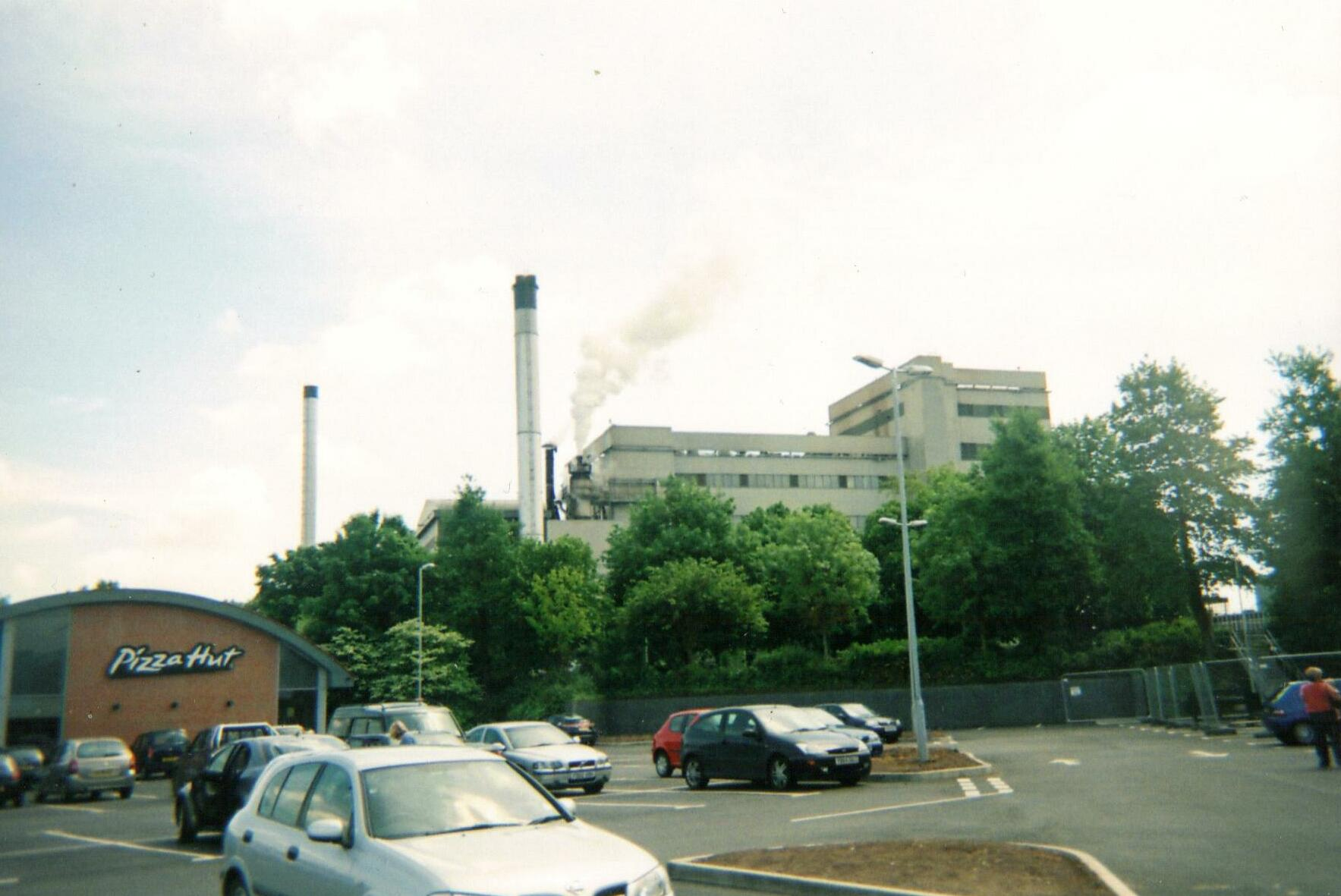
The Kraft Foods factory in Banbury has been a major employer in the town since the mid-1960s.

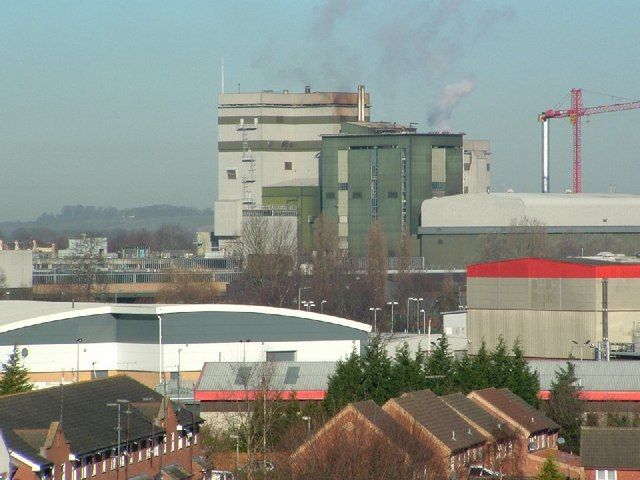
The Kraft Factory – a familiar sight on the skyline of Banbury.

The local Kraft Foods Banbury plant, which is sometimes known as General Foods after the original owner the building, and the Beaumont industrial estate and Lockheed Drive retail estate would become the leading employers for Ruscote and Hardwick estates. During October 2006, a warehouse block that was being prepared for demolition, belonging to Kraft Foods, caught fire and burned most of the day. There was a notable fire at the coffee plant on Tuesday 7 December 2010. In Spring 2010, a lorry load of Kenco Coffee was stolen by a driver who conned his way into the plant.

The Ruscote Arcade and the Hillview Arcade are another two shopping facilities on the estate.

== Schools ==
The estate is served by one school

- Hill View Primary School, Hill View Crescent.

== Recreational areas and parks ==
- Both Hillview Park and Ruscote Park are 2 large, co-joined, parks situated in the middle of the estate, and connecting to a children's play park that leads down between the local shopping complexes at the Ruscote Arcade and the Hillveiw Arcade.
- A small extension, known locally as the Aldi Park and/or the Co-Op Park, is set across the road by the town's Aldi store. Both parks have many facilities, including monkey bars, swings, football pitches and basketball courts. Together the three parks measure approx. 45,000m^{2}.

There is one other minor children's play park elsewhere.

There were some concerns over anti-social behaviour and heavier than average litter levels in Princess Diana Park and Hillview Park and that fly-tipping in Banbury also affects some streets and footpaths such as on the Ironstones' paths.

== Hardwick ==
=== History ===
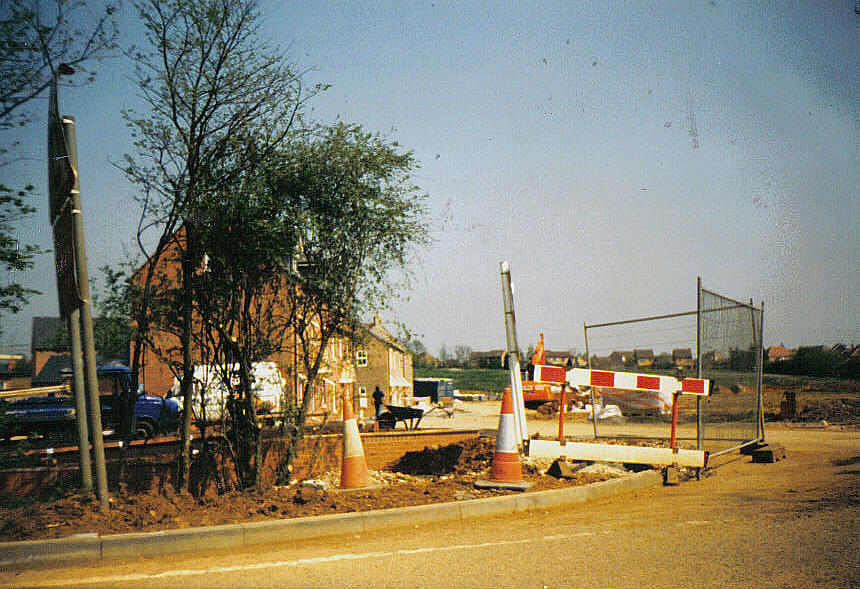
The Hardwick estate in 1993.

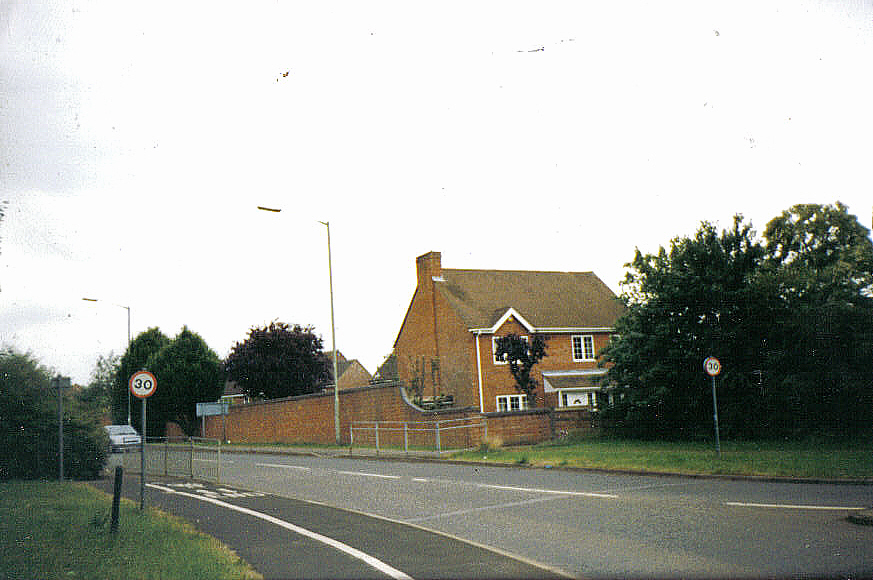
The Hardwick estate in the early 2000s (decade).

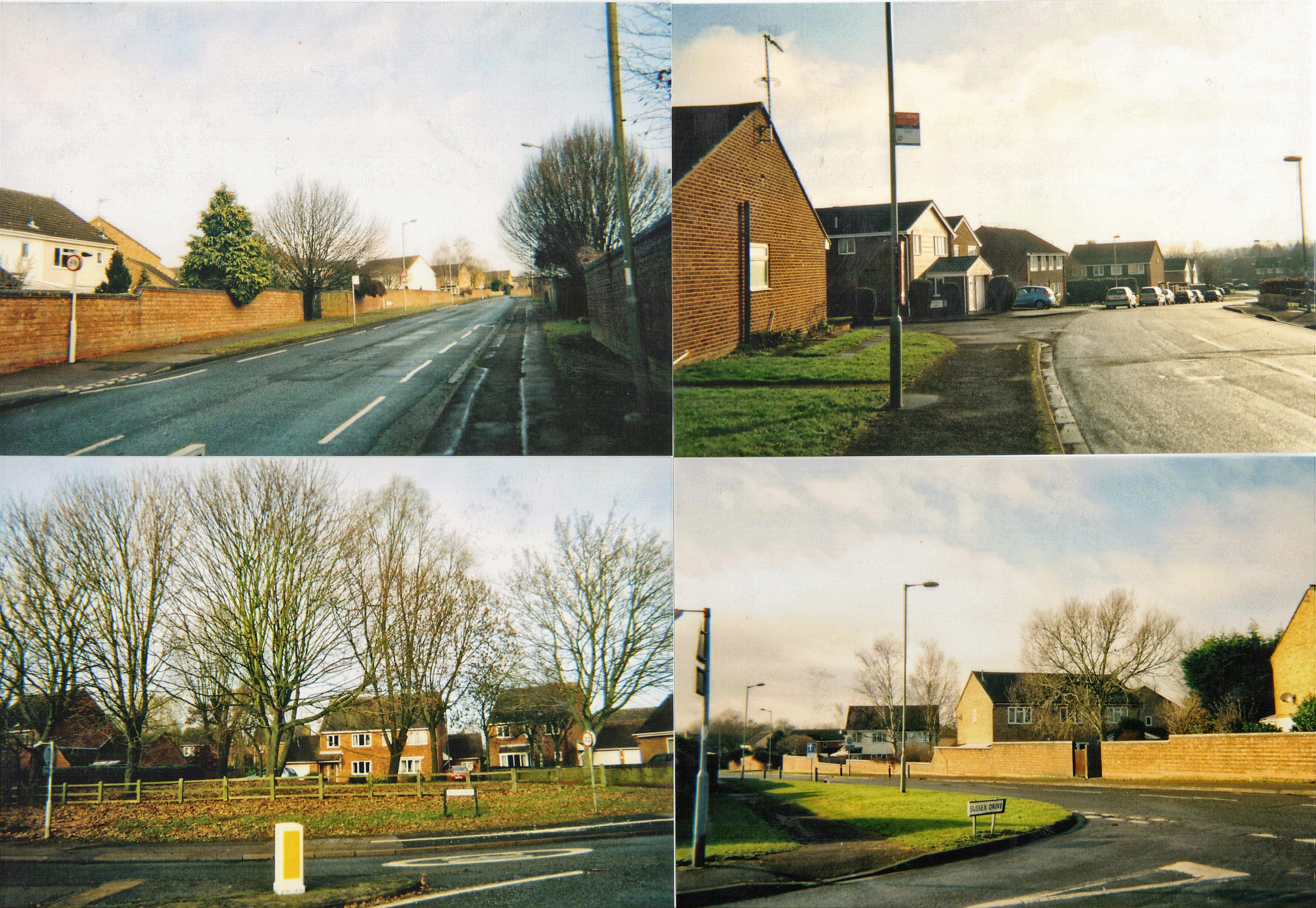
Images of Hardwick, Banbury in 2011.

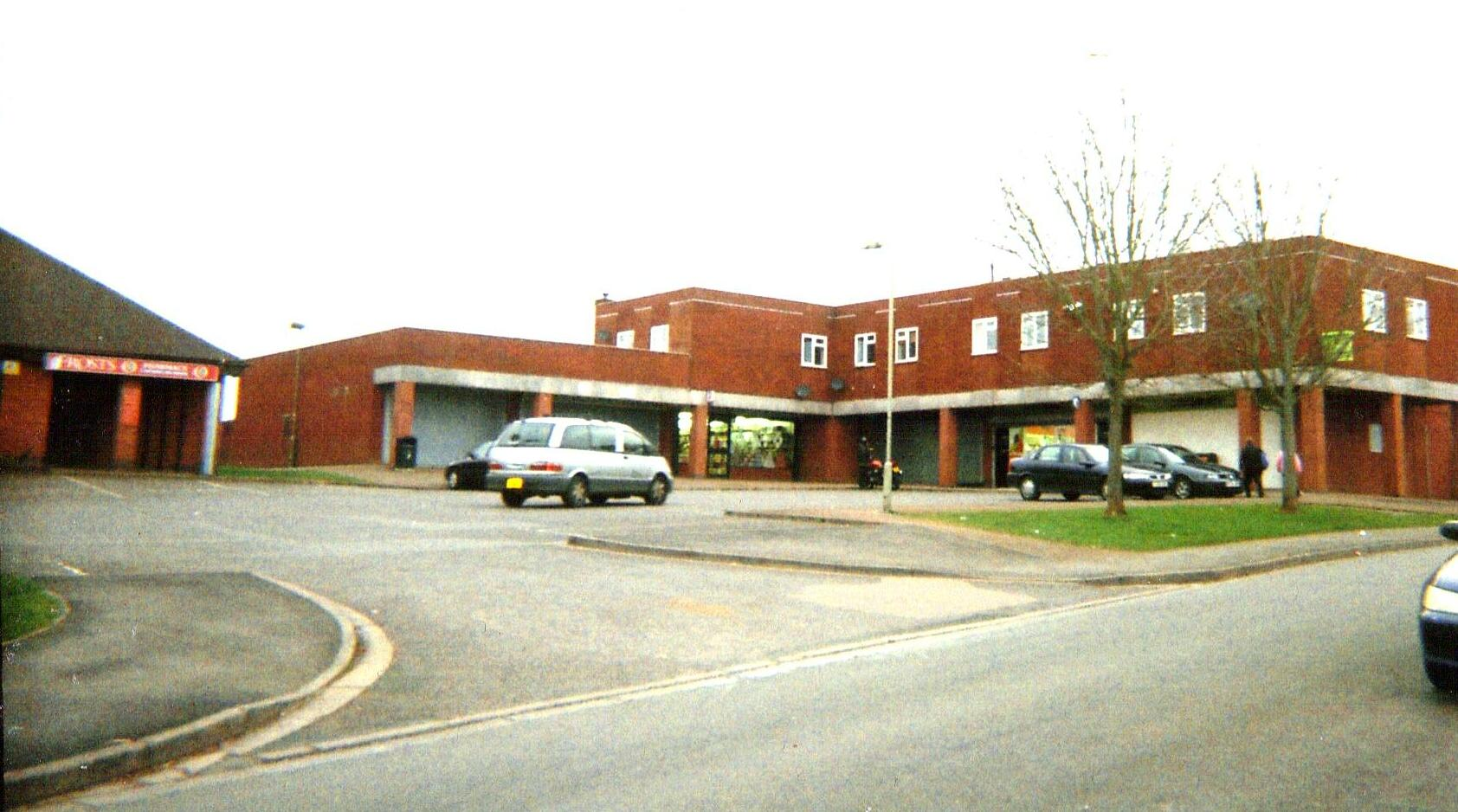
The Hardwick Arcade shopping mall in 2011.

One of the first records of the hamlet of Hardwick was in the year 1279 when 'Laurence of Hardwick' was paying rent for a local mill to the Bishop of Lincoln.

In 1247 The hundred of Banbury was valued at £5 a year and in 1441 'certainty money' (a form of rent) due from the northern part of the hundred was 89s. 8d. It was made up of payments from Shutford, Claydon, Swalcliffe, Great Bouton and Little Bourton, Prescote, Hardwick, Calthorpe and Neithrop, Wickham, Wardington, Williamscot, Swalcliffe Lea, and the former 'prebend' of Banbury. By 1568 these, except the rent from Wardington and amounted to 69s. 4d. in 1652, when the total profits of court were valued at 103s. 4d. a year in 'certainty money'. In 1875 payments were made only by Williamscot, Swalcliffe, Prescote, Great and Little Bourton, Neithrop, Claydon, and Shutford since the rest were freed from their rent obligations.

Hardwick was a Medieval hamlet that did not expand much until the late 19th century and was formally incorporated into the borough of Banbury in 1889. It became a minor village in the late 1930s and finally a housing estate in the late 1950s.

=== Industry and commerce ===
The presence of local industry was recorded as far back as the year 1279, when 'Laurence of Hardwick' was paying 3 Marks in rent to the Bishop of Lincoln annually for a mill in Hardwick hamlet.

The Northern Aluminium Co. Ltd. or Alcan Industries Ltd. pig and rolled Aluminium factory was opened in 1931 on land the firm had bought in 1929 on the east of the Southam road, in the then hamlet of Hardwick. Output had reached such an extent that in the early 1950s that Banbury's economy had become dependent on the plant's prosperity, with 24%, of the town's workers being employed there. At this time 13% were employed in distribution, 7% in clothing and 5% in agriculture. The former Alcan factory that helped build parts for Spitfire fighters aircraft during the Second World War. The Alcan Laboratories Club was founded in 1948 by the lab technicians to promote the wellbeing of the workforce in general. As a result, the village began to grow.

The various Alcan facilities on the 53-acre (21 ha) site closed between 2006 and 2007. The factory was demolished between 2008 sand 2009. The laboratory was also demolished in 2009.

Most of the estate built in the 1970s because of the growth of the town due to the Birmingham overspill and a slum clearance scheme in Smethwick. Some Welsh families have moved in since. It was expanded further in the mid-1980s. The main shopping facility is the Hardwick arcade.

=== Schools ===
The estate is served by four schools.

- Hardwick Community School Ferriston Rd., Banbury.
- Hardwick Primary School Ferriston Rd., Banbury
- Hardwick And Arden Pre-school
- Hardwick School.

=== Private health clinic ===
Hardwick Surgery is a privately run health centre in Ferriston Rd., Banbury.

=== Recreational areas and parks ===
- The Ironstones Play Area , near Ferriston Rd. was recently upgraded at a cost of a budget of £70,000. it is situated in the large Ironstones Park. The Engineered Wood Fiber (EWF) floor surface was removed during the 2007 renovation work, in favour of a safer ATP Rubberized Unitary Surface due to kids throwing the wood chips at each other, leading to a serious eye injury occurring in 2005.
- The Ironstone Park is a park in the Hardwick ward of Banbury in the English county of Oxfordshire. It is an average size park that it situated off ironstones (street). There is a medium size children's play area and a Large field measuring approx 18,000 m^{2}. It is adjacent to Hardwick School.
- The Hereford Way Play Park is a small play park.
- The Sussex Drive Play Park is a small play park.
- The Magnolias Park is a major park and contains the Magnolias Play Park.

There were some concerns over anti-social behaviour and heavier than average litter levels in Princess Diana Park and Hillview Park and that fly-tipping in Banbury also affects some streets and footpaths such as on the Ironstones' paths.

== Hanwell Fields ==
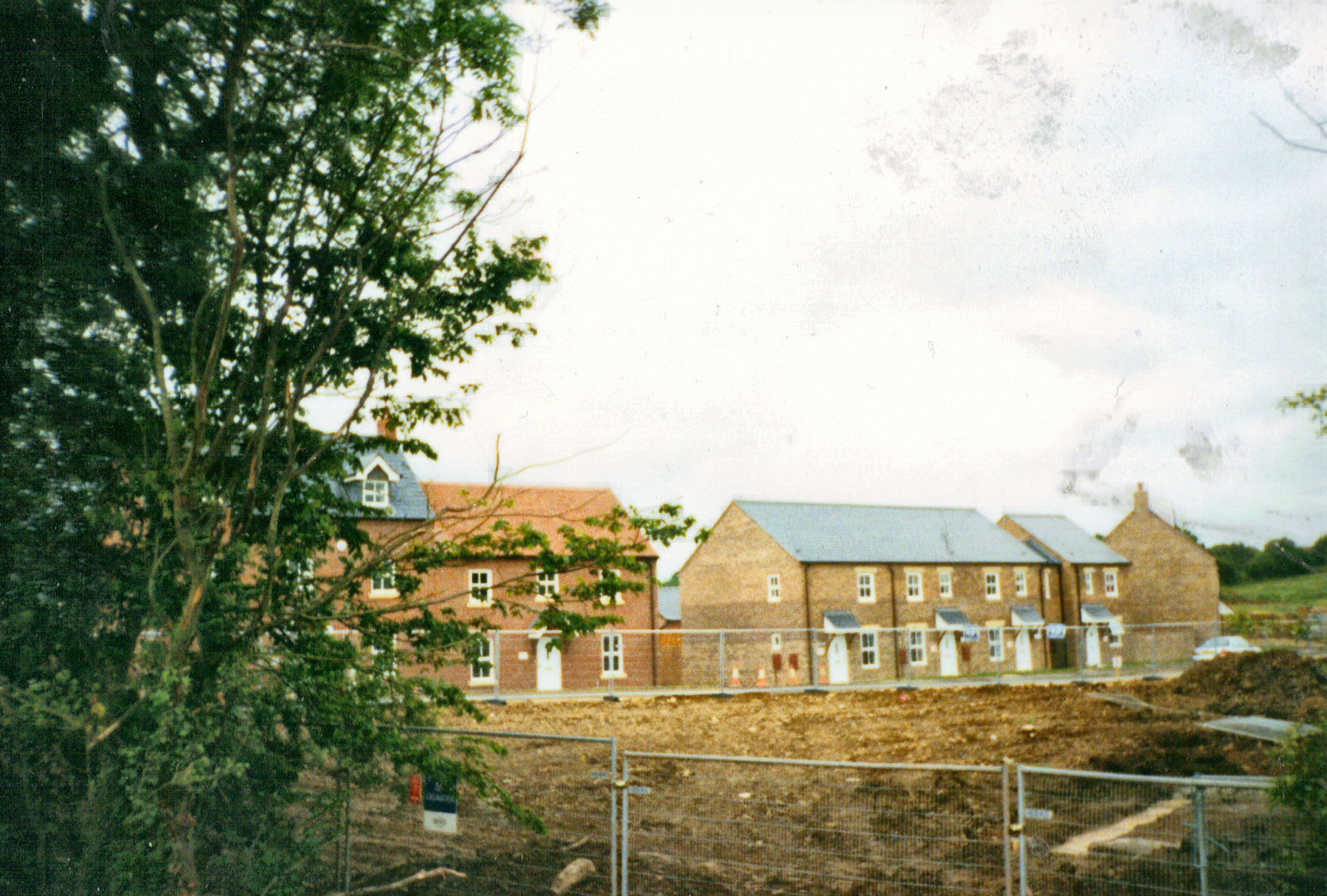
An image of the Hanwell Fields estate, Banbury in 2004.

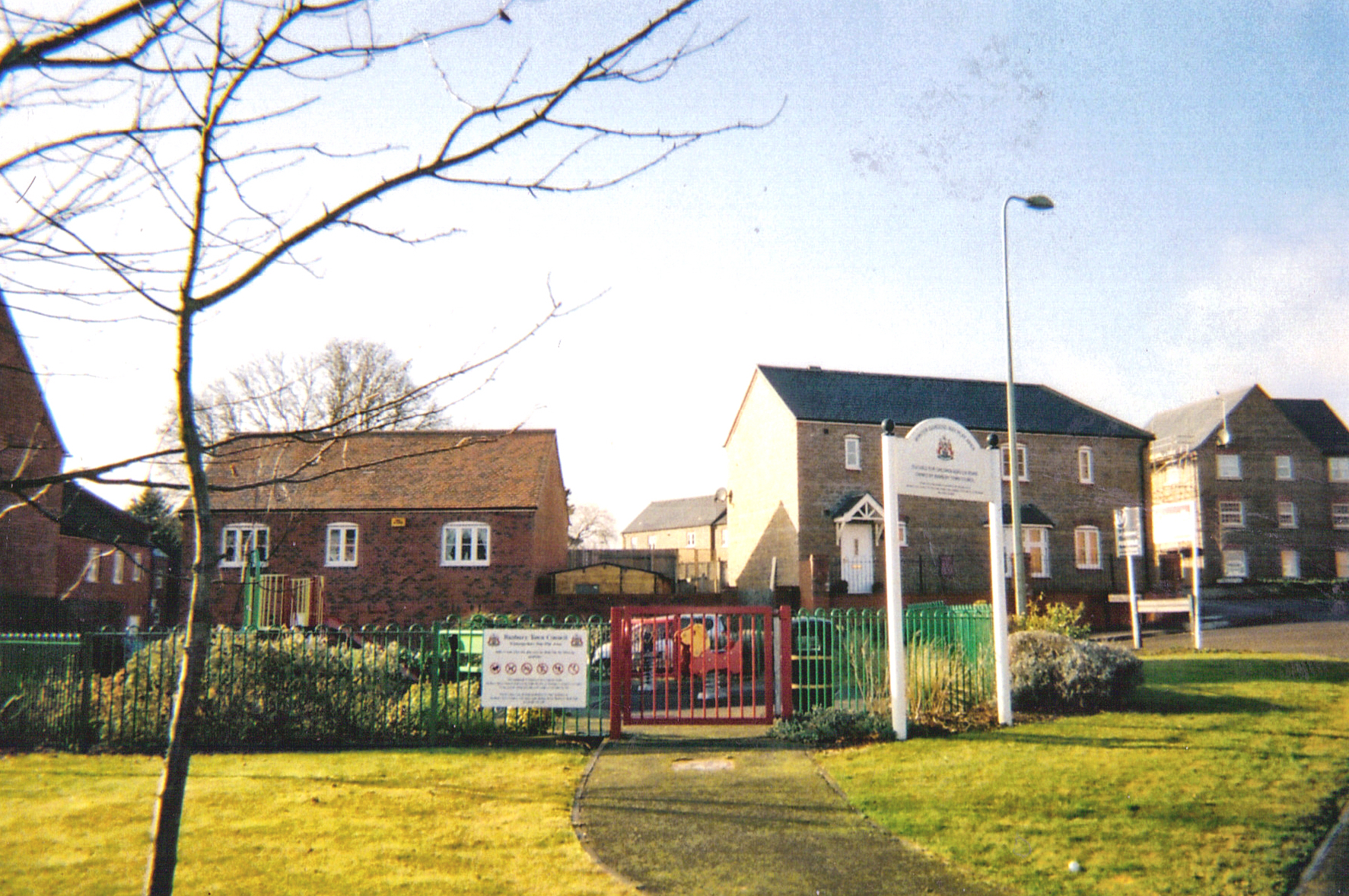
The Winter Gardens Way Children's Play Park, Banbury, UK, during 2010.

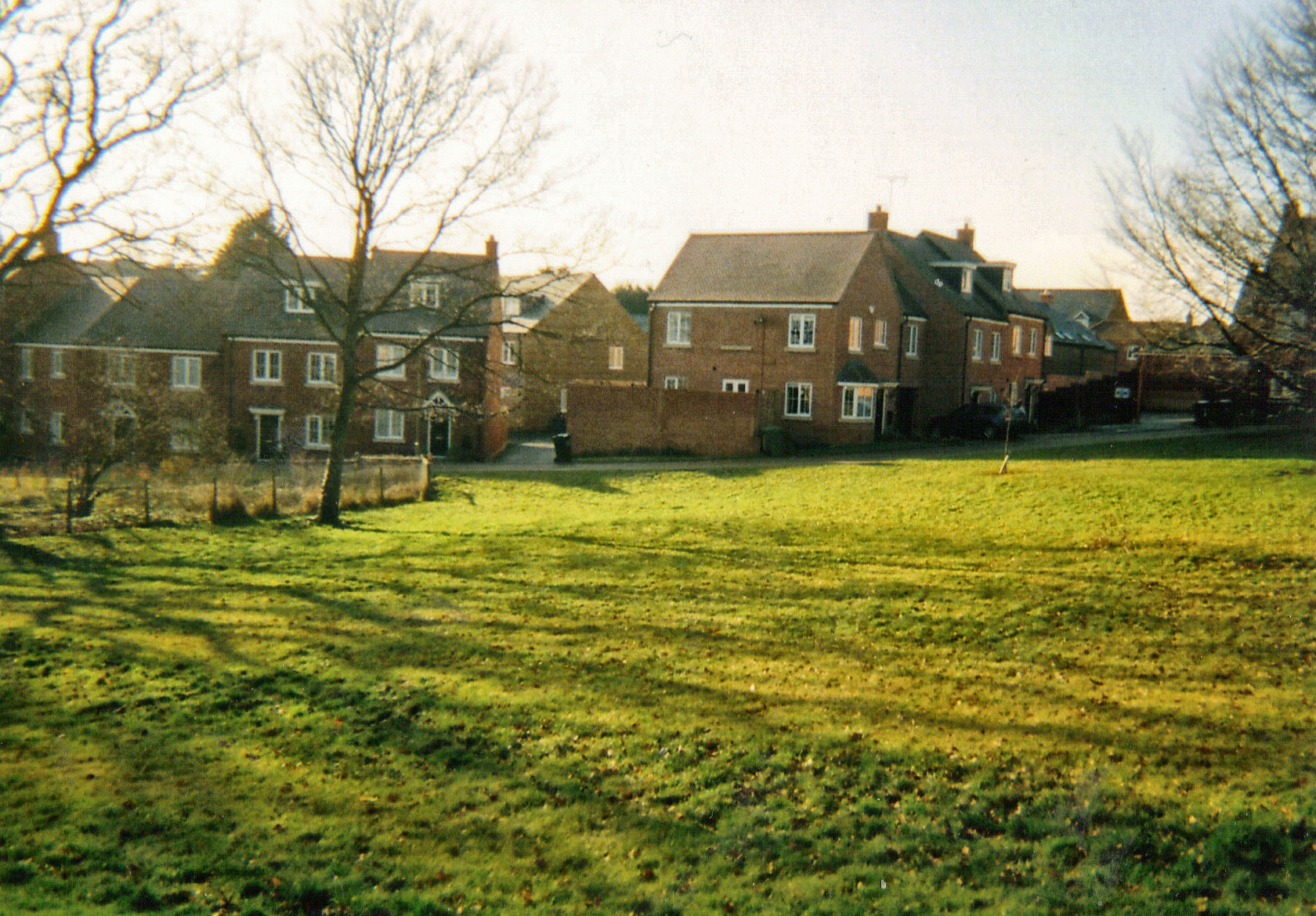
A picture of the Hanwell Fields estate, Banbury in early 2011.

=== History ===
Hanwell Field has been farmland since at least Norman times. Local villagers farmed the parish of Hanwell, Oxfordshire and its related lands on a two-field open field system until 1768, when Sir Charles Cope, 2nd Baronet bought out the rights of copyholders, life and leaseholders and enclosed the common lands.

In 1645 during the English Civil War, Parliamentary troops were billeted in nearby Hanwell village for nine weeks. Villagers petitioned the Warwickshire Committee of Accounts to pay for feeding them.

The estate lies between Banbury and Hanwell, built in-between 2001 and 2006, with a minor extension occurring in 2008 on the grounds of the former Hanwell Farm. This has become one of the constituent houses due to the natural growth of the town's commuter population.

Hanwell Fields was heavy flooded for a few days in 2007 due to heavy rainfall. The estate has a small group of shops and one pub. Many residents are part of London's commuter population.

=== Schools ===
Hanwell Fields Community School, Rotary Way.

=== Recreational areas and parks ===
- Winter Gardens Way Children's Play Park is well maintained and has 1 bench, 1 playground slide and a Spring rider. It is one of the smallest parks in the area, measuring roughly 10 ft × 12 ft (3.0 m × 3.7 m).
- Ashmead Close Play Park is a small children's play park.
- Usher Drive Park is a small park on the edge of town and contains the Usher Drive Play Park.
- Sage Close Play Park is a small play park.
- Pitmaston Road Play Park is a small play park.
- Meadowsweet Close Park and children's play park is roughly two-thirds the size of Princess Diana Park and contains the Meadowsweet Close Play Park .
- Rosedale Green is a small picnic site and park.

There is a large green space made up of grassy fields and seating to the north, which may be partly built on if planning permission is granted.

Sport Teams

Within Hanwell, Hardwick & Ruscote there are the following sport teams

Banbury Lions CC (South Northants Cricket League & South East Shires Cricket League)

FC Kayi (Banbury District & Lord Jersey Premier)

Hanwell United (Oxfordshire Senior League Div 1)

Hardwick Sports FC (Oxfordshire Senior League Div 1)

=== Planned expansion ===
A nearby field to the north has recently been developed following a formal application for the building of another 20 houses and a Sainsbury’s Local corner shop.

== Transport ==
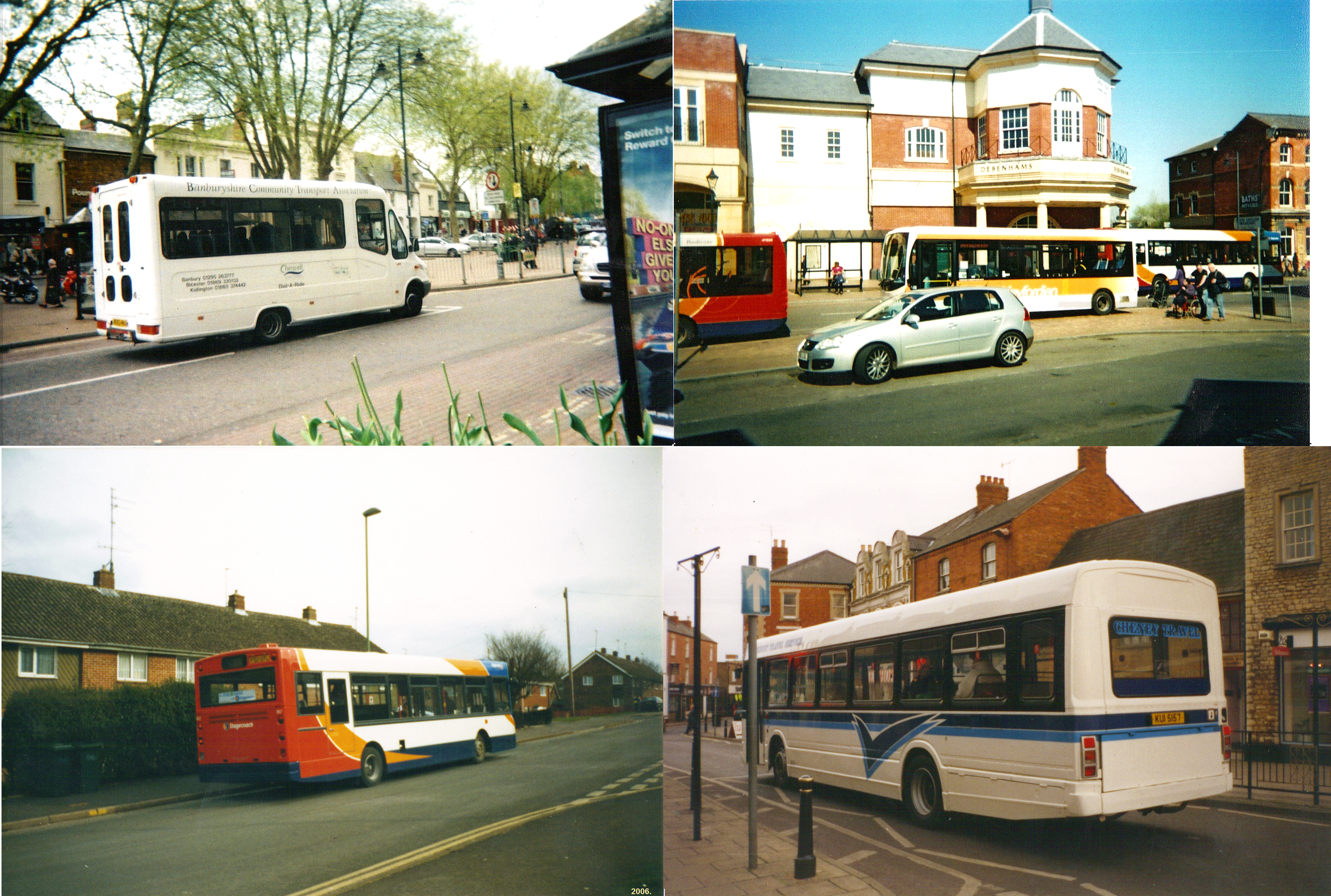
A former Cheney Coaches bus, a Heyfordian bus, a Stagecoach bus and a Banburyshire Community Transport Association (B.C.T.A). bus in Banbury. The Stagecoach busses ran every 20 minutes on weekdays and every 30 minutes at weekends as of 2008 and the Heyfordian bus runs every 30 minutes, except on Sundays as of 2009.

The local bus services to Banbury town centre and the Hardwick and Ruscote estate are run by the Stagecoach Oxfordshire bus company. Heyfordian Travel also run a service to the Hardwick estate and Hanwell Fields via the local Tesco and the Barley Mow pub. Cheney Coaches also ran a service that ran parallel to most of the Stagecoach route between 1996 and 2004.

== Local politics ==
The Ruscote and Hardwick wards were traditionally a Labour ward but for the first time, during the 2006 local elections for Cherwell District Council, the Ruscote ward changed to one Labour councillor and one Conservative Party councillor. The traditionally present Green party candidate lost in 2006.

The Conservatives held the ward for the Banbury Town Council and Oxfordshire County Council out right as of 2010.

The UKIP or British National Party fielded no candidates in the ward during 2006. A lone Liberal Democrat ran and lost in the Hardwick estate during 2006.

Following the local elections of 2012, the Conservatives retain all District and Town council seats in Hardwick while Labour holds all District and Town council seats in Ruscote.

== See also ==
- History of Banbury, Oxfordshire
- Kraft Foods
