= Spring rider =

Playground equipment

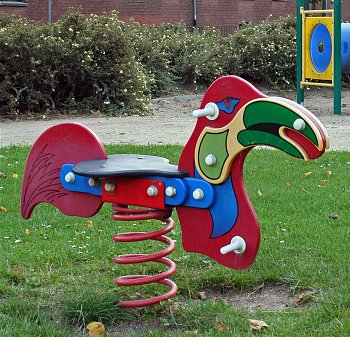
A Dutch spring rider.

A spring rider or spring rocker is a bouncy, outdoors playing device, invented in the 1960s in Italy by the company Pozza. It mainly consists of a metal spring beneath a plastic or wooden central beam or flange, with 1 to 4 plastic or fiberglass seats above it. When a person sits on it, the structure moves and bounces. Spring riders are common in many playgrounds. They are often designed to look like an animal or a vehicle.

Prior to this, the horse spring toy was patented in 1956 in Pasco, Washington. This toy is commonly known as a rocking horse or spring toy. This is because it has a great resemblance to these things.
