= Cropredy =

Village in Oxfordshire, England

Coordinates: 52.116°N 1.320°W

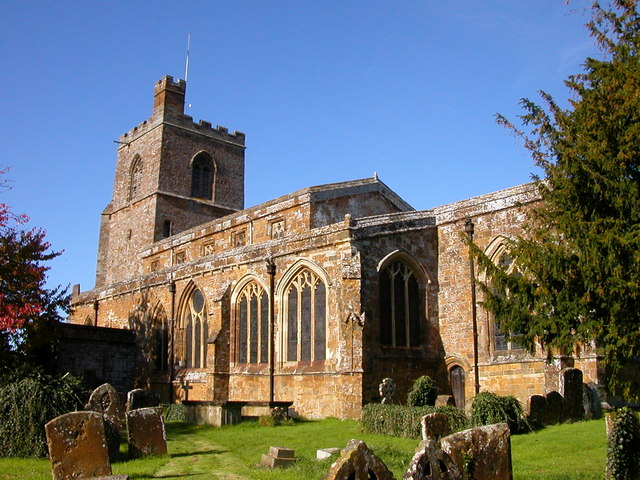
- St Mary the Virgin parish church

- Location within Oxfordshire
- Area: 9.42 km^{2} (3.64 sq mi)
- Population: 717 (Both area and population include the civil parish of Prescote in the 2011 Census for reasons of confidentiality of the latter being officially deemed too small to make up its own Output Area.)
  - Density: 76/km^{2} (200/sq mi)
- OS grid reference: SP4646
  - London: 82 miles (132 km)
- Civil parish: Cropredy
- District: Cherwell
- Shire county: Oxfordshire
- Region: South East
- Country: England
- Sovereign state: United Kingdom
- Post town: Banbury
- Postcode district: OX17
- Dialling code: 01295
- Police: Thames Valley
- Fire: Oxfordshire
- Ambulance: South Central
- UK Parliament: Banbury

Cropredy (/ˈkrɒprədi/ KROP-rə-dee) is a village and civil parish on the River Cherwell, 4 miles (6.4 km) north of Banbury in Oxfordshire.

== History ==
The village has Anglo-Saxon origins and is recorded in the Domesday Book of 1086. The toponym comes from the Old English words cropp (a hill) and ridig (a stream).

From 1519 onwards Brasenose College, Oxford owned extensive land in Cropredy. Manor Farm was built in 1693 and Prescote Manor was built in 1721.

Cropredy Bridge on the River Cherwell was the site of a major battle in 1644 during the English Civil War. King Charles engaged the Parliamentarian army led by Sir William Waller. The battle was a stalemate; the Parliamentarian side suffered heavy casualties but ultimately prevented the King's forces from crossing the bridge. A plaque on the bridge bears the inscription: "The site of the Battle of Cropredy Bridge June 1644 from Civil War Good Lord deliver us." Before the battle, some of the church valuables were hidden in the River Cherwell; these included the brass eagle lectern, which was not recovered for 50 years, during which time it was damaged.

== Church and chapels ==
The Church of England parish church of Saint Mary the Virgin is built of the local ironstone, which is a ferrous Jurassic limestone. Parts of the south aisle date from the 13th century. However, most of the present building is Decorated Gothic and was built in the 14th century, including the chancel arch, nave arcades, east window and most of the windows in the south aisle. In the 15th century Perpendicular Gothic alterations were made including a clerestory added above the nave, the north aisle rebuilt with new windows, and both aisles extended eastwards to form side chapels.

The church had a clock by 1512, when the vicar, Roger Lupton, left £6 13s 4d in his will in trust for the churchwardens to pay someone to keep the clock running and chiming every quarter-hour and the village curfew. Lupton's will prescribed that the wardens be fined 6s 8d per month of £10 per year if they were to fail. A new clock may have been installed around 1700, and Lupton's clock may then have been transferred to Claydon. The later clock was itself replaced in 1831 with a new one made by John Moore and Sons of Clerkenwell, London.

The bell tower has a ring of bells. There were six, but in 2007 two new treble bells increased this to eight. One of the new bells is named St Mary; the other Fairport Convention Festival Bell.

St Mary's parish is now part of the Benefice of Shires' Edge along with those of Claydon, Great Bourton, Mollington and Wardington.

By the 13th century Cropredy was associated with the legend of Saint Fremund, a Mercian who was said to have been martyred in the 9th century. Fremund's relics are supposed to have been moved from Offchurch in Warwickshire to Prescote, where they were lost for a time and then rediscovered and moved to Cropredy. They were then moved to the Augustinian Priory at Dunstable, probably in 1207, but an association with Fremund remained at Cropredy. There are records of gifts to a chapel and shrine to the saint here in 1488 and 1539, and a chantry priest serving in St. Fremund's chapel in 1489. During the English Reformation under Edward VI the Crown sold the chapel and its contents in 1549 and it was probably demolished. No trace remains, its site is unknown and it is not clear whether the shrine chapel was at St. Mary's church or elsewhere in the parish.

A Methodist chapel had been built by 1822. The congregation outgrew it so a larger chapel was built on a new site in 1881.

== Transport ==
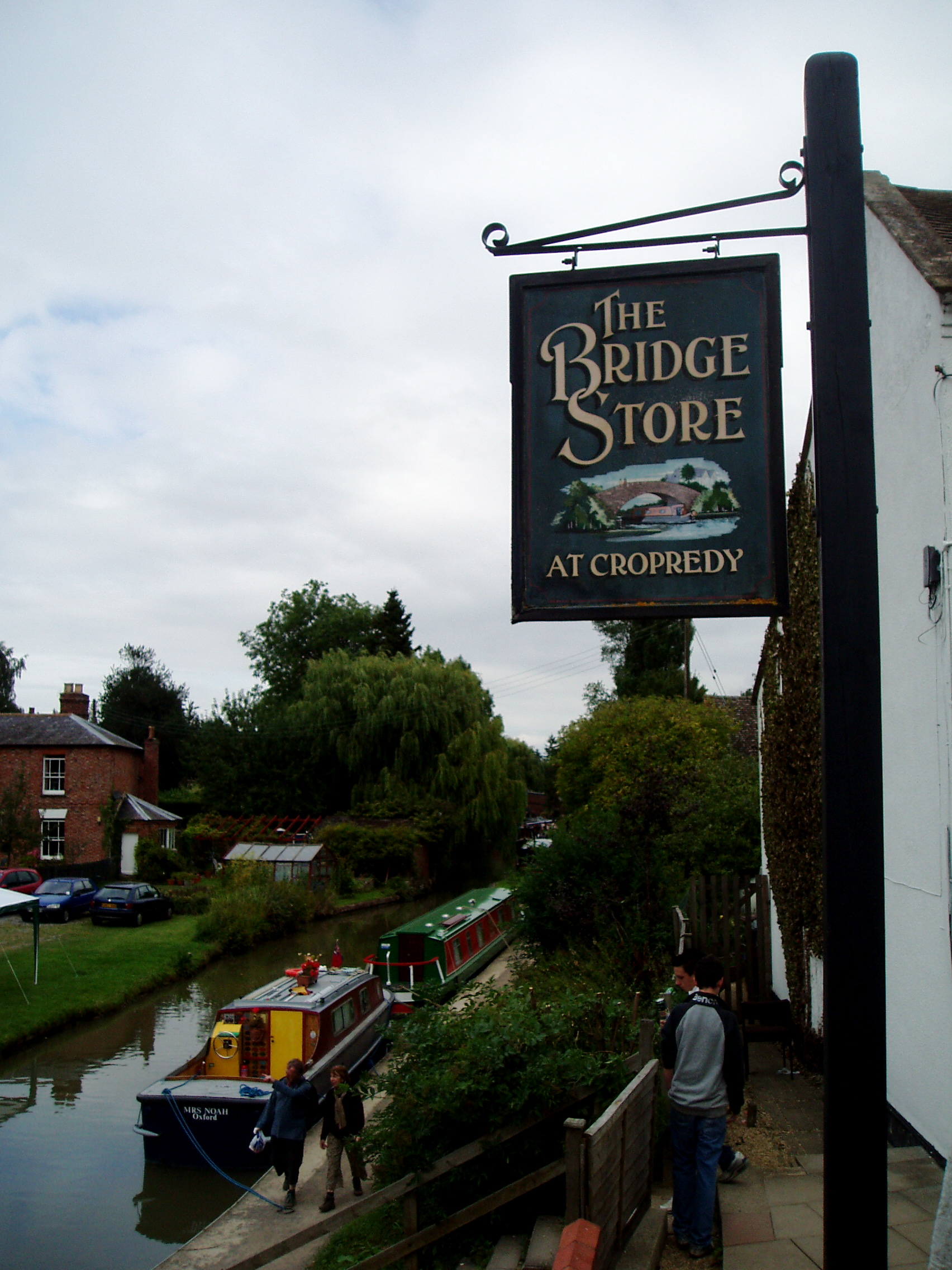
The Oxford Canal at Cropredy

Building of the Oxford Canal began at Hawkesbury Junction on the Coventry Canal in 1769 and reached Cropredy in October 1777. The canal passes between the River Cherwell and the village. There is a canal lock here, and at the south end of the village a wharf was built. This originally handled coal from the Coventry coalfield, and now serves the canal's popular leisure traffic. The wharf was briefly the canal's terminus, until the section from Cropredy to Banbury opened in March 1778. The canal finally reached Oxford and the River Thames at the end of 1789.

The Oxford and Rugby Railway had been built from Oxford northwards past Cropredy by 1852. It never reached Rugby, but at Fenny Compton it met the Birmingham and Oxford Junction Railway and thus became part of an important north–south main line. The Great Western Railway took over the O&RR before it was completed, and opened Cropredy railway station to serve the village. British Railways closed the station in 1956, but the railway remains open as part of the Chiltern Main Line.

Cropredy's public transport is bus route 503 between Banbury and Long Itchington in Warwickshire, operated by Catteralls Coaches with one bus each way a week on Thursdays only and route 502, operated by Stagecoach, between Temple Herdewyke and Banbury with one bus each way a week on Saturdays and Good Friday.

== Education ==
A National School, Cropredy and Bourton School, was opened in Cropredy in 1855. In 1867 it was renamed simply Cropredy School and a second classroom was added. In 1947 it was reorganised as a junior and infant school. Today it is a Church of England primary school.

== Amenities ==
Cropredy has two public houses: the 17th century Brasenose Arms and the Red Lion. The village has a GP's practice and several shops.

== Annual music festival ==
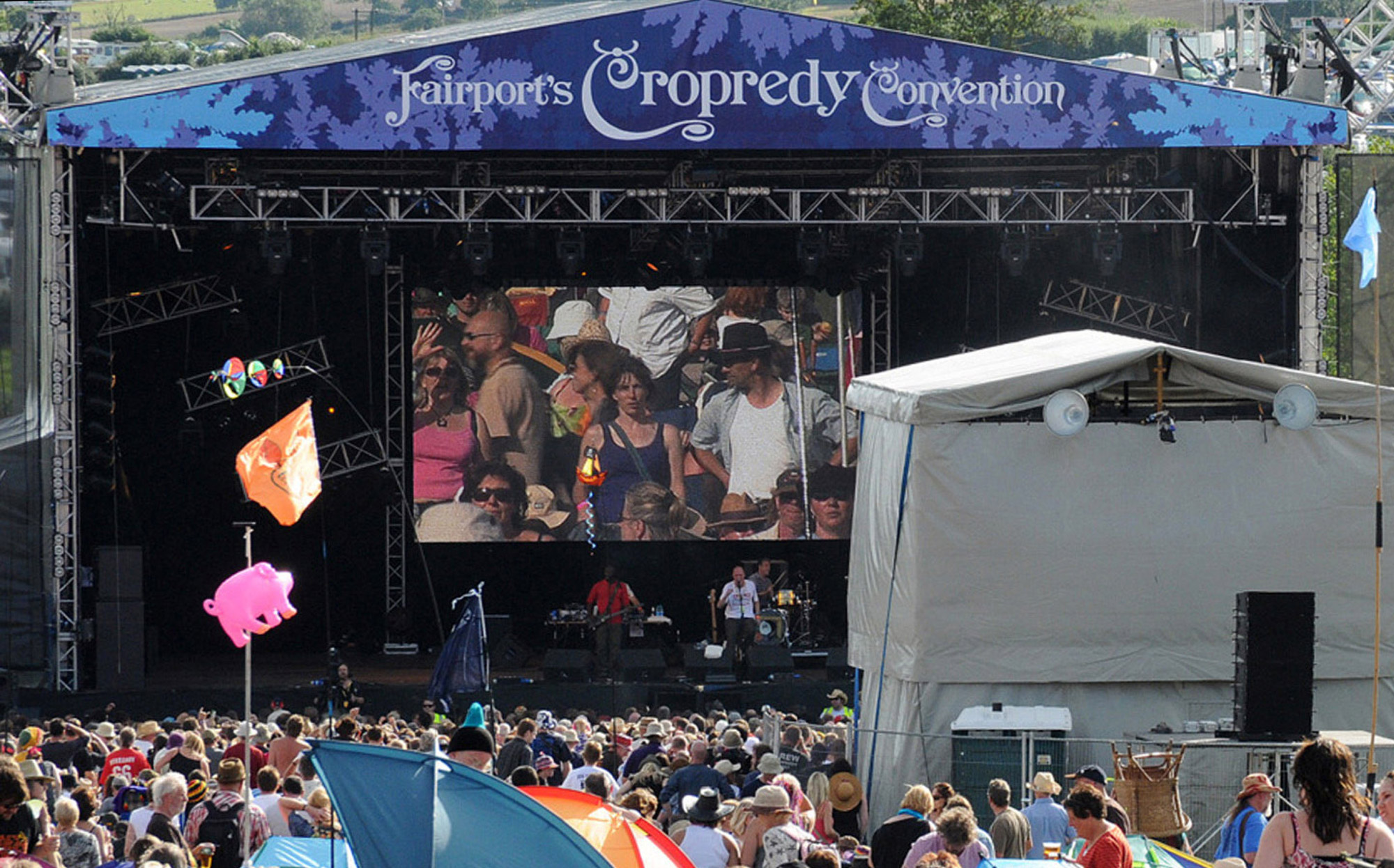
The stage at Fairport's Cropredy Convention annual festival, August 2009

On farmland east of the village British folk rock band Fairport Convention stages an annual three-day music festival titled Fairport's Cropredy Convention. The festival has expanded from a one-day event first held in 1980 (although the band had played fundraisers in the village since 1976).

== See also ==
- "Banburyshire"
- History of Banbury

== Sources ==
- Beeson, C.F.C. (1989) [1962]. Simcock, A.V. (ed.). Clockmaking in Oxfordshire 1400–1850 (3rd ed.). Oxford: Museum of the History of Science. p. 20. ISBN 0-903364-06-9.
- Compton, Hugh J. (1976). The Oxford Canal. Newton Abbot: David & Charles. ISBN 0-7153-7238-6.
- Colvin, Christina; Cooper, Janet; Cooper, N.H.; Harvey, P.D.A.; Hollings, Marjory; Hook, Judith; Jessup, Mary; Lobel, Mary D.; Mason, J.F.A.; Trinder, B.S.; Turner, Hilary (1972). Crossley, Alan (ed.). A History of the County of Oxford. Victoria County History. Vol. 10: Banbury Hundred. London: Oxford University Press for the Institute of Historical Research. pp. 157–175. ISBN 978-0-19722-728-2.
- Redwood, Fred; Woodward, Martin (1995). The Woodworm Era: The story of today's Fairport Convention. Thatcham: Jeneva. ISBN 0-9525860-0-2.
- Sherwood, Jennifer; Pevsner, Nikolaus (1974). Oxfordshire. The Buildings of England. Harmondsworth: Penguin Books. pp. 559–560. ISBN 0-14-071045-0.
- Toynbee, MR; Leeming, JJ (1938). "Cropredy Bridge" (PDF). Oxoniensia. III. Oxford Architectural and Historical Society: 123–138.
- Walker, George Graham (1975). Churches of the Banbury Area. Kineton: Roundwood Press. ISBN 0-900093-52-8.
