= Claydon, Oxfordshire =

Village in Oxfordshire, England

Coordinates: 52.147°N 1.333°W

Claydon
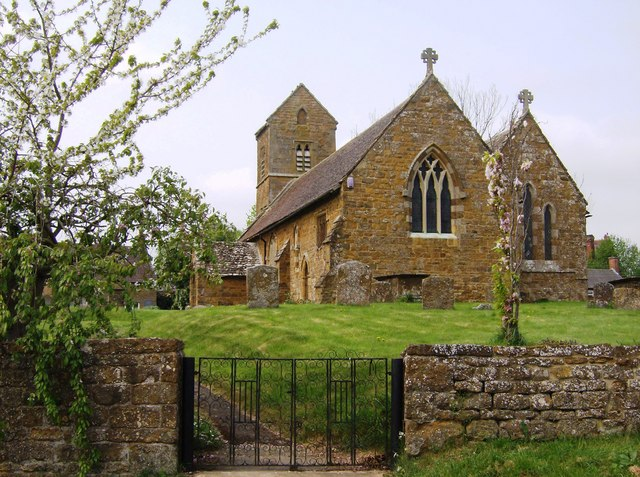
- St. James the Great parish church

- Location within Oxfordshire
- Population: 306 (parish) (2011 Census)
- OS grid reference: SP4550
- Civil parish: Claydon with Clattercot
- District: Cherwell
- Shire county: Oxfordshire
- Region: South East
- Country: England
- Sovereign state: United Kingdom
- Post town: Banbury
- Postcode district: OX17
- Dialling code: 01295
- Police: Thames Valley
- Fire: Oxfordshire
- Ambulance: South Central
- UK Parliament: Banbury
- Website: Claydon Village

Claydon is a village in the civil parish of Claydon with Clattercot, in the Cherwell district of Oxfordshire, England. The village is about 6 miles (10 km) north of Banbury and about 417 feet (127 m) above sea level on a hill of Early Jurassic Middle Lias clay.

The village is the northernmost settlement in Oxfordshire and as such is also the northernmost settlement in the entire South East England region. The parish is bounded by Warwickshire to the west and Northamptonshire to the east. The 2011 Census recorded the parish's population as 306.

== Church and chapel ==
=== Church of England ===
The Church of England parish church of Saint James the Great was a dependent chapelry of the parish of Cropredy until 1851. St. James' was originally Norman, built in about AD 1100. The arcade between the nave and north aisle survives from this date, as does the south doorway. Slightly later a chapel was added at the east end of the north aisle, linked by Early English Gothic arches to both the aisle and the chancel. There is also a squint from the chapel to the chancel. The bell tower was added in the 14th century, and the chancel was extended eastwards in either the 14th or the 15th century. The south porch is a late Medieval Perpendicular Gothic addition, and the ironwork on the south door was added in 1640.

In 1856 the Bishop of Oxford, Samuel Wilberforce, expressed dissatisfaction with the condition of the church building. In 1860 the Gothic Revival architect William White heavily restored the building, including renewal of the foundations. White almost completely rebuilt the north aisle, and so altered the chancel that its original date may not be determined with certainty.

The bell tower has three bells. Two were cast by a member or members of the Newcombe family of bell-founders: the second bell in 1609 and the treble in 1611. At that time the Newcombes had foundries at Bedford and Leicester. The tenor bell was cast in 1756 and Mears and Stainbank of the Whitechapel Bell Foundry recast it in 1910. For technical reasons the bells are currently unringable. The church has also an early clock of an unusual design. The date of its manufacture is unknown, but its style suggests that it dates from the 17th century.

St. James' parish is now part of the Benefice of Shires' Edge along with those of Cropredy, Great Bourton, Mollington and Wardington.

=== Methodist ===
A Primitive Methodist congregation developed in Claydon from 1835 and built a chapel in 1846. By 1969 it no longer had its own minister and was served by visiting clergy in the Banbury Methodist Circuit. The chapel has since closed and has been converted into a garage for the house next door.

== Economic and social history ==
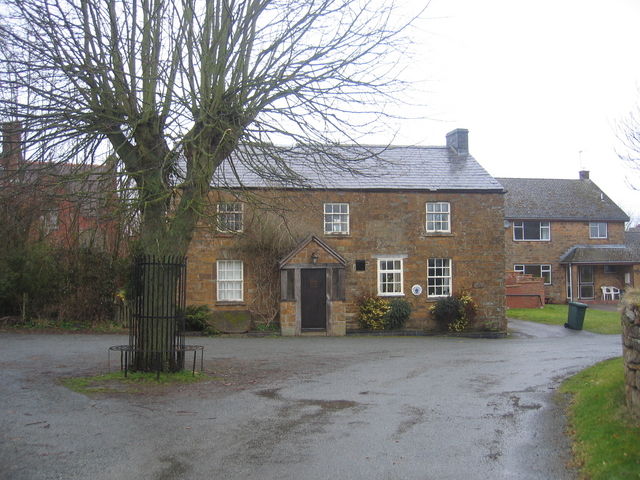
The Sunrising Inn was the last pub in Claydon and closed in 1990. It was a tied house of the Hunt Edmunds brewery of Banbury.

The clockmakers Samuel Knibb (1625–70), Joseph Knibb (1640–1711) and John Knibb (1650–1722) were born at Claydon. Joseph and John were brothers and Samuel was a cousin. Samuel traded in Newport Pagnell from about 1655 to 1663, when he moved to London and went into a partnership making instruments as well as clocks. Joseph traded in Oxford from about 1663, but when Samuel died in 1670 Joseph moved to London and took over his business. John joined Joseph in Oxford in about 1664, took over their Oxford business when Joseph moved to London in 1670 and was Mayor of Oxford in 1697 and 1710. On 26 September 2010 the Oxfordshire Blue Plaques Board unveiled a blue plaque at Claydon to Samuel, Joseph and John Knibb.

Historic houses in Claydon include Manor Farm built in 1720 and Claydon House. Claydon House is originally believed to be a 15th-century tithe barn. It was owned in 1776 by one of the Knibb family. The house was recorded as the "Mill and Plough" in 1781 and was still serving ale until 1820. Later returning to a private residence it was purchased in 1867 by the vicar of Claydon, Rev. George.W. Palmer, to be the vicarage and was given to the Ecclesiastical Commissioners in Oxford as a benefaction known as Claydon Vicarage. The property was altered that year by Edwin Dolby, the Victorian architect who altered a number of parish churches and vicarages. Claydon Vicarage was sold, on behalf of the Church Commissioners, in 1958 and it was subsequently renamed Claydon House and returned to being a private house.

Between 1753 and 1763 Claydon had three public houses. By 1781 this had fallen to two, and from 1841 the number of pubs in the village fluctuated between one and two until the latter part of the 20th century. The New Inn had closed by 1969 and the Sunrising Inn closed in January 1990. The latter is now a private house, but still displays a white and blue enamel plaque of the Hunt Edmunds brewery of Banbury.

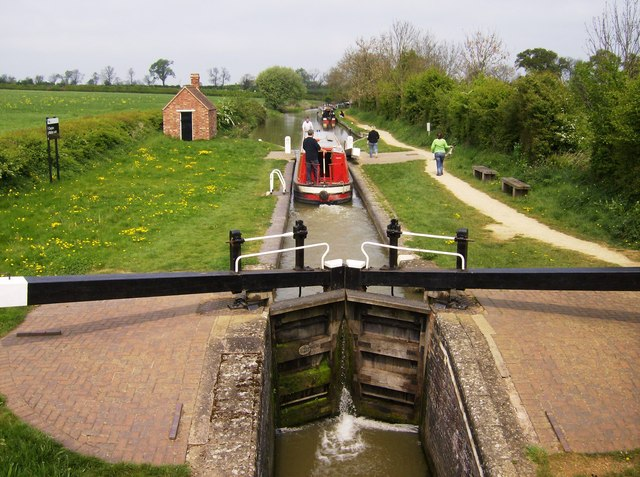
On the Oxford Canal: Claydon Middle Lock, built 1776–77

Construction of the Oxford Canal began north of Coventry in 1769. In May 1776 it reached Fenny Compton in Warwickshire, 2 1/2 miles (4 km) northwest of Claydon. and by November 1777 the canal had been extended to Cropredy in Oxfordshire, passing through Claydon parish by skirting the north and east sides of the hill on which Claydon stands. On the east side of the hill the canal's engineer Samuel Simcock built Claydon Locks, a flight of five locks that begins the canal's southward descent from its 11-mile long summit pound. Between them the five locks achieve a total rise (i.e. change in water level) of 30 feet 6 inches (9.3 m).

An open field system of farming prevailed in the parish until 1776 when an Act of Parliament enclosed the common lands of the parish.

In 1852 the Great Western Railway extended its Oxford and Rugby Railway through the western edge of Claydon parish to a new railway station at Fenny Compton. In 1872–73 the East and West Junction Railway built a line from its Fenny Compton West railway station to Towcester through glebe land in the north of Claydon parish. Claydon's nearest station was 2 1/2 miles (4 km) to the south at Cropredy, until British Railways closed it in 1956.

Claydon and Clattercote School Board was established in 1875 and opened Claydon village school in 1877. The school closed in 1948.

Claydon was historically a chapelry in the ancient parish of Cropredy. Parish functions under the poor laws from the 17th century onwards were administered separately for Claydon from other parts of Cropredy parish. Claydon therefore became a separate civil parish in 1866, when the legal definition of 'parish' was changed to be the areas used for administering the poor laws. In 1932 Claydon was merged with the neighbouring parish of Clattercot to become a new civil parish called Claydon with Clattercot. At the 1931 census (the last before the abolition of the civil parish), Claydon had a population of 199.

The village was struck by an F0/T1 tornado on 23 November 1981, as part of the record-breaking nationwide tornado outbreak on that day.

== Amenities ==
The Bygones Museum at Butlin Farm in Claydon was founded in 1972. This privately owned museum is now closed.

== Sources ==
- Beeson, CFC (1989) [1962]. Simcock, A.V (ed.). Clockmaking in Oxfordshire 1400–1850 (3rd ed.). Oxford: Museum of the History of Science. p. 35. ISBN 0-903364-06-9.
- British Waterways Board (1965). British Waterways Inland Cruising Booklet 6, Cruising on The Oxford Canal, Napton Junction to Oxford. London: British Waterways Board.
- Crossley, Alan (ed.); Colvin, Christina; Cooper, Janet; Cooper, NH; Harvey, PDA; Hollings, Marjory; Hook, Judith; Jessup, Mary; Lobel, Mary D; Mason, JFA; Trinder, BS; Turner, Hilary (1972). A History of the County of Oxford. Victoria County History. Vol. 10: Banbury Hundred. London: Oxford University Press for the Institute of Historical Research. pp. 184–194. ISBN 978-0-19722-728-2.
- Compton, Hugh J (1976). The Oxford Canal. Newton Abbot: David & Charles. ISBN 0-7153-7238-6.
- Sherwood, Jennifer; Pevsner, Nikolaus (1974). Oxfordshire. The Buildings of England. Harmondsworth: Penguin Books. p. 548. ISBN 0-14-071045-0.
