= Great Bourton =

Village in Oxfordshire, England

Coordinates: 52.106°N 1.335°W

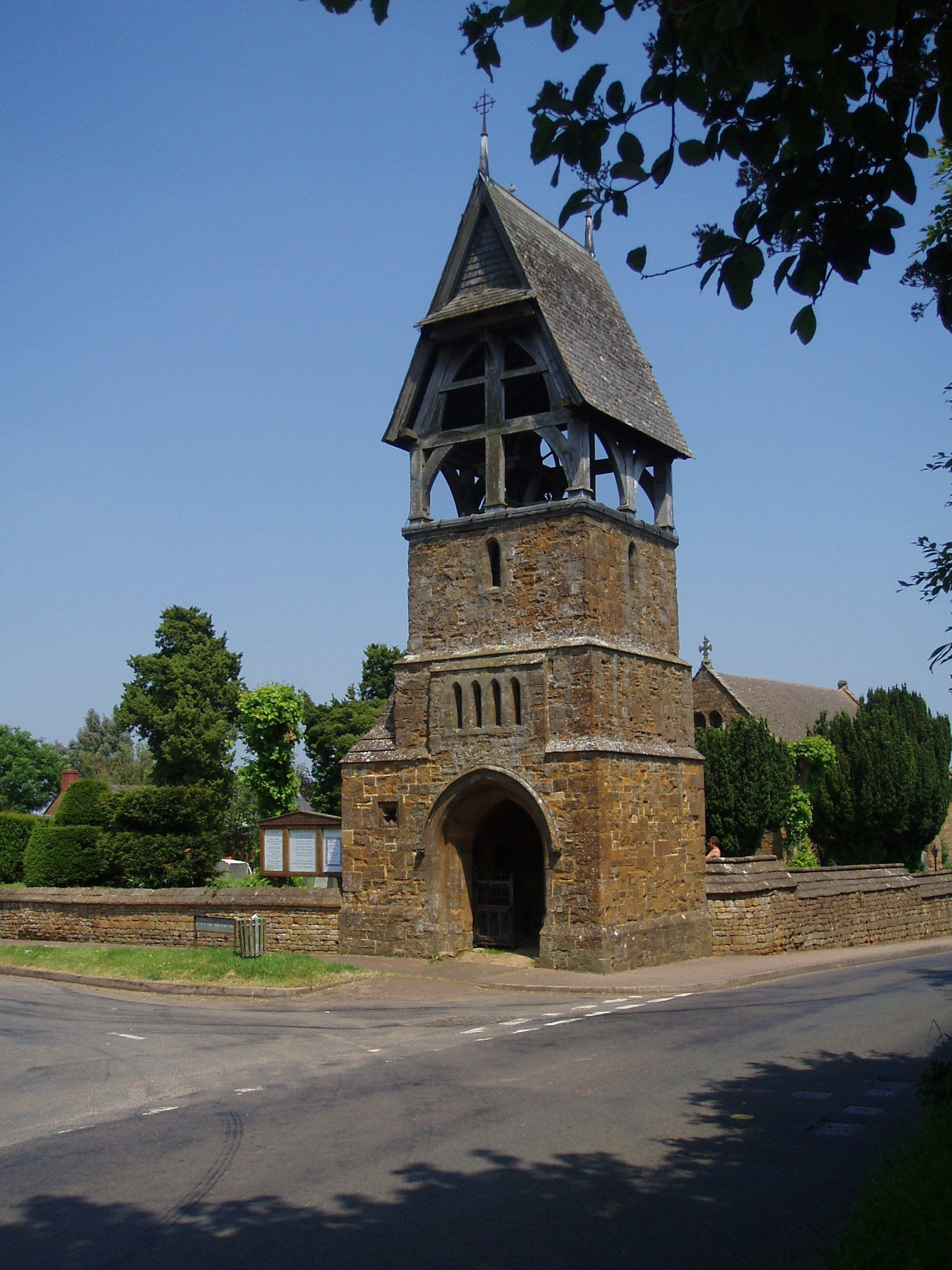
- All Saints' parish church bell tower

- Location within Oxfordshire
- Population: 614 (parish, with Little Bourton) (2011 Census)
- OS grid reference: SP456455
- Civil parish: Bourton
- District: Cherwell
- Shire county: Oxfordshire
- Region: South East
- Country: England
- Sovereign state: United Kingdom
- Post town: Banbury
- Postcode district: OX17
- Dialling code: 01295
- Police: Thames Valley
- Fire: Oxfordshire
- Ambulance: South Central
- UK Parliament: Banbury
- Website: The Bourtons

Great Bourton is a village about 3 miles (5 km) north of Banbury in Oxfordshire, England. It is the largest settlement in the civil parish of Bourton. The 2011 Census recorded the parish's population as 614.

== Church and chapel ==
=== Church of England ===
The Church of England parish church of All Saints was originally 13th century. The west wall of the nave has a recess containing a small bell cast by Henry I Bagley of Chacombe in 1673. In 1863 the church was almost entirely rebuilt to plans by the architect William White, who added a bell tower, separate from the church, built over the lychgate. It is one of only three such bell towers in Britain to be so sited. All Saints' parish is now part of the Benefice of Shires' Edge along with those of Claydon, Cropredy, Mollington and Wardington.

=== Methodist ===
Great Bourton village hall used to be the Methodist Chapel.

== History ==
In the Battle of Cropredy Bridge in June 1644, the Parliamentarian General Waller saw that the Royalist army was strung out from its position on higher ground near Great Bourton and decided to order an attack. The Royalists pushed Waller's force back to Great Bourton when it met the Royalist Earl of Northampton's brigade of horse.

== Amenities ==
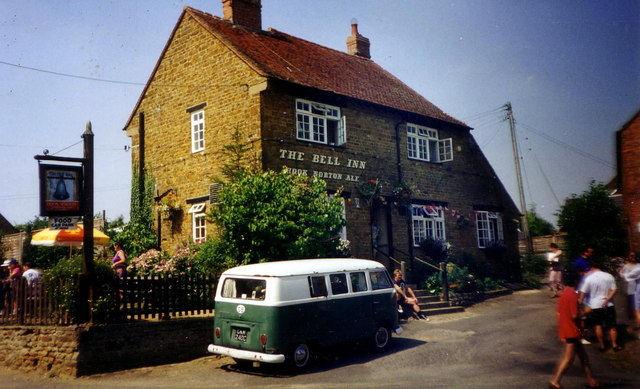
The Bell Inn in 1995

Great Bourton has a pub, The Bell, that is controlled by Hook Norton Brewery.

Great Bourton's only public transport is bus route 502 between Banbury and Temple Herdewyke in Warwickshire. The current operator is Stagecoach in Warwickshire. There is one bus a day on Saturdays.

== Sources ==
- Crossley, Alan (ed.); Colvin, Christina; Cooper, Janet; Cooper, NH; Harvey, PDA; Hollings, Marjory; Hook, Judith; Jessup, Mary; Lobel, Mary D; Mason, JFA; Trinder, BS; Turner, Hilary (1972). A History of the County of Oxford. Victoria County History. Vol. 10: Banbury Hundred. London: Oxford University Press for the Institute of Historical Research. pp. 175–184. ISBN 978-0-19722-728-2.
- Sherwood, Jennifer; Pevsner, Nikolaus (1974). Oxfordshire. The Buildings of England. Harmondsworth: Penguin Books. p. 617. ISBN 0-14-071045-0.
