= Cropredy Bridge =

Bridge in United Kingdom

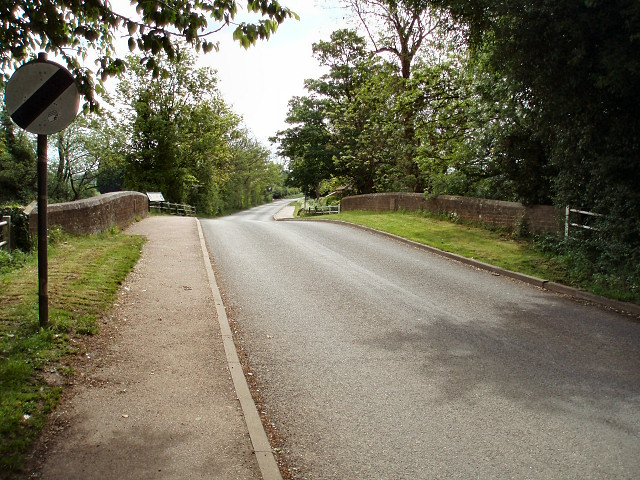
- View across the bridge towards Williamscot
- Coordinates: 52.1147°N 1.3150°W
- Carried: minor road
- Crossed: River Cherwell
- Locale: between Cropredy and Williamscot, Oxfordshire
- Owner: Oxfordshire County Council
- Maintained by: Oxfordshire County Council
- Website: web.archive.org/web/20111127015457/http://www.oxfordshire.gov.uk/cms/

Characteristics
- Material: Concrete
- No. of spans: 3

History
- Construction end: 1937
- Opened: 1937
- Collapsed: 1644 (Site of the Battle of Cropredy Bridge)
- Replaced: Medieval bridge repaired in 1691

Cropredy Bridge is a bridge in north Oxfordshire, England, that carries the minor road between Cropredy and the hamlet of Williamscot. It spans the River Cherwell, which is also the boundary between the civil parishes of Wardington (which includes Williamscot) and Cropredy. The bridge has three spans, a reinforced concrete deck and is faced with Hornton stone. Each of the three spans is 12 feet (3.7 m). The present bridge was completed in 1937, but there has been a bridge on this site since at least 1312.

== History ==
The earliest record of the bridge is of work carried out on it in 1312. It is not clear whether it was built at this time, or whether the bridge was even older and just being repaired. Numerous 14th- and 15th-century deeds refer to the magna pons or le longebrugge of Cropredy.

Cropredy bridge featured at least twice in the English Civil War. On 23 October 1642 King Charles I and part of his Royalist army crossed the bridge en route from Edgcote, Northamptonshire to Edge Hill, Warwickshire to confront a Parliamentarian force led by Earl of Essex in the Battle of Edgehill. On 29 June 1644 Royalist and Parliamentarian forces fought each other for control of the bridge in the Battle of Cropredy Bridge. The Royalist force was personally led in battle by Charles I. It defeated the Parliamentarian force, which was commanded by Sir William Waller.

The bridge may have been damaged in the battle, as there was repair or reconstruction work in 1691, according to the date on a capstone on its cutwater. As well as the year, the capstone bears a pair of initials, which could be either "SS" or "J.J.". The bridge had two arches, and it seems to be the larger, western one that was repaired after the Civil War. The smaller, eastern arch was pointed, predated the 17th century and may have been medieval.

In 1776 the Trinity sitting of the Oxfordshire quarter session was told that the bridge was "in great decay broken and ruinous". The western arch was eventually rebuilt in 1780, making it round-headed. An early 19th-century engraving shows that although the bridge was of stone it had no parapets; only wooden railings.

In 1886 the bridge was widened on its downstream (south) side, increasing its width to 17 feet (5.2 m) and giving it parapets on both sides. The justices wanted the widening to be built of red brick. The Vicar of Cropredy, Dr William Wood, opposed this clash of materials with the existing part of the bridge, which was of local Hornton stone. The two parties compromised by agreeing upon Staffordshire blue brick. The building was done by a local builder, Cherry and Son of Cropredy. The widening was not given a downstream cutwater, which left the pier with a cutwater only on its upstream side.

The parts of the bridge built at different times were not well bonded to each other. The upstream cutwater was not bonded to the upstream face of the bridge, and by the 1930s two trees were growing in the gap. The stonework of the upstream face was also significantly decayed. The trees were so well-established that Oxfordshire County Council considered the only way to remove them was to demolish the bridge. Demolition revealed the abutment and springing of an older bridge inside the abutment on the Cropredy side.} The springing was very low down, 4 feet (1.2 m) below the present summer water level of the river.

In 1937 the two-arched bridge was demolished and replaced with the present three-span one. As much as possible of the Hornton stone of the old bridge was used in the facing of the new one. The date-stone from the old cutwater was reset in the north side of the new bridge.

== Sources ==
- Colvin, Christina; Cooper, Janet; Cooper, N. H.; Harvey, P. D. A.; Hollings, Marjory; Hook, Judith; Jessup, Mary; Lobel, Mary D.; Mason, J. F. A.; Trinder, B. S.; Turner, Hilary (1972). Crossley, Alan (ed.). A History of the County of Oxford, Volume 10: Banbury Hundred. Victoria County History. pp. 157–175. ISBN 978-0-19722-728-2.
- Jervoise, Edwyn (1932). The Ancient Bridges of Mid and Eastern England. Vol. III. Westminster: The Architectural Press for the SPAB. pp. 152–153.
- Toynbee, M.R.; Leeming, J. J. (1938). "Cropredy Bridge" (PDF). Oxoniensia. III. Oxford Architectural and Historical Society: 123–138.
