= Cropredy railway station =

Railway station in Oxfordshire, England

Coordinates: 52.1127°N 1.3219°W

Cropredy
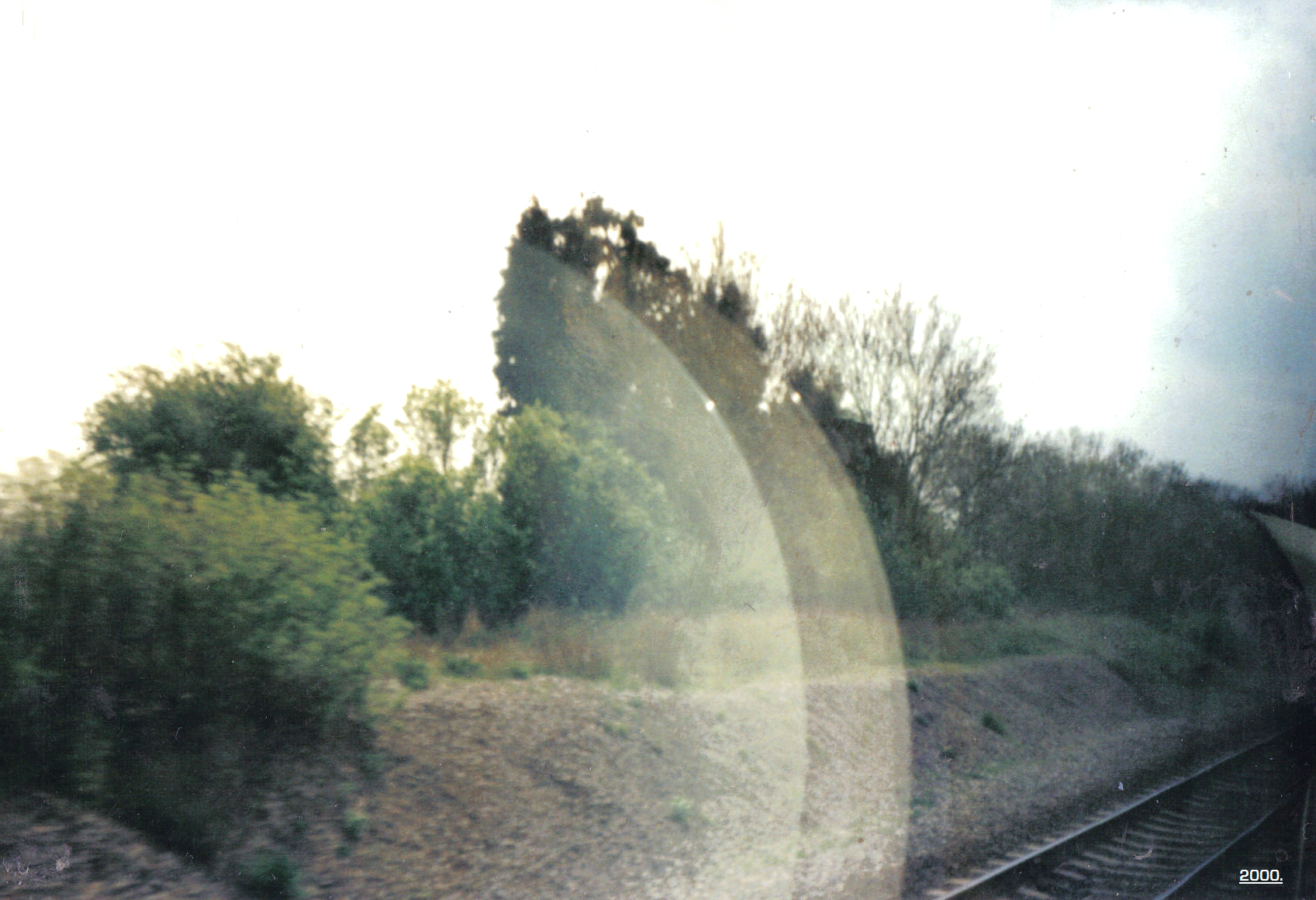
- Site of Cropredy station in 2000.

General information
- Location: Great Bourton, District of Cherwell; England
- Grid reference: SP465462
- Platforms: 2

Other information
- Status: Disused

History
- Original company: Oxford and Rugby Railway
- Pre-grouping: Great Western Railway
- Post-grouping: Great Western Railway; Western Region of British Railways

Key dates
- 1854: Station opens
- 1956: Station closes
Location

Cropredy railway station was formerly a railway station on the Great Western Railway at Great Bourton, Oxfordshire, serving the village of Cropredy. The station building was made of brick and wood, and there was a goods siding and goods shed from

== History ==
The Oxford and Rugby Railway had been built from Oxford northwards past Cropredy by 1852. It never reached Rugby, but at Fenny Compton it met the Birmingham and Oxford Junction Railway and thus became part of an important north–south main line.

The Great Western Railway took over the O&RR before it was completed, and opened Cropredy railway station in 1854 to serve the village of that name. The buildings were all wooden, situated on a brick platform in 1908. British Railways closed the station in 1956. The station was demolished and few traces remain. The railway remains open as part of the Chiltern Main Line.

== Routes ==
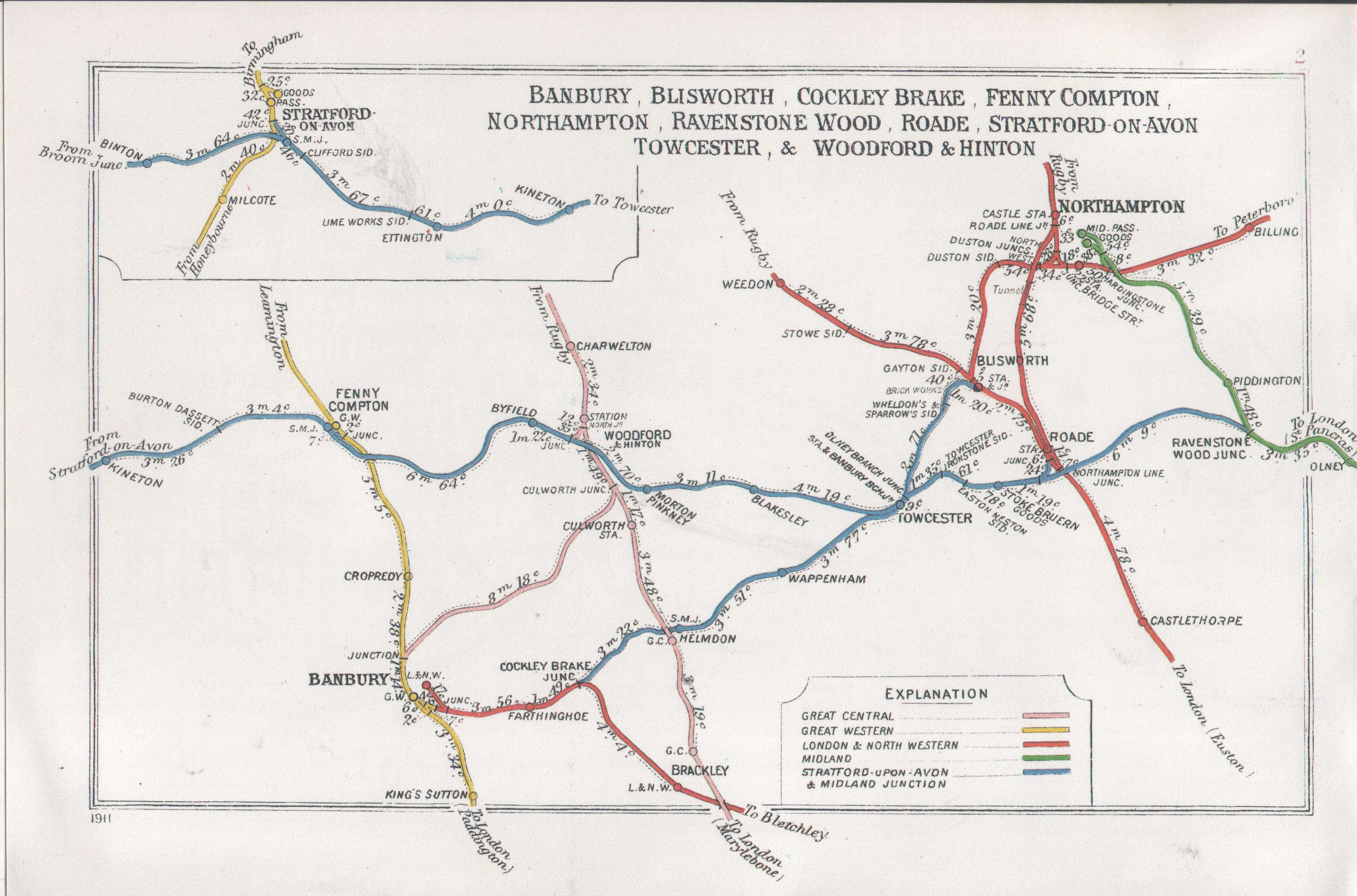
A 1911 Railway Clearing House map of railways in the vicinity of Cropredy (lower left, in yellow)

Preceding station	Historical railways	Following station
Banbury; Line and station open	Great Western Railway; Chiltern Main Line	Fenny Compton; Line open, station closed
