= Mollington =

Mollington could be

- Mollington, Cheshire
- Mollington, Oxfordshire
