= Mollington, Oxfordshire =

Village in Oxfordshire, England

Coordinates: 52.124°N 1.361°W

Mollington
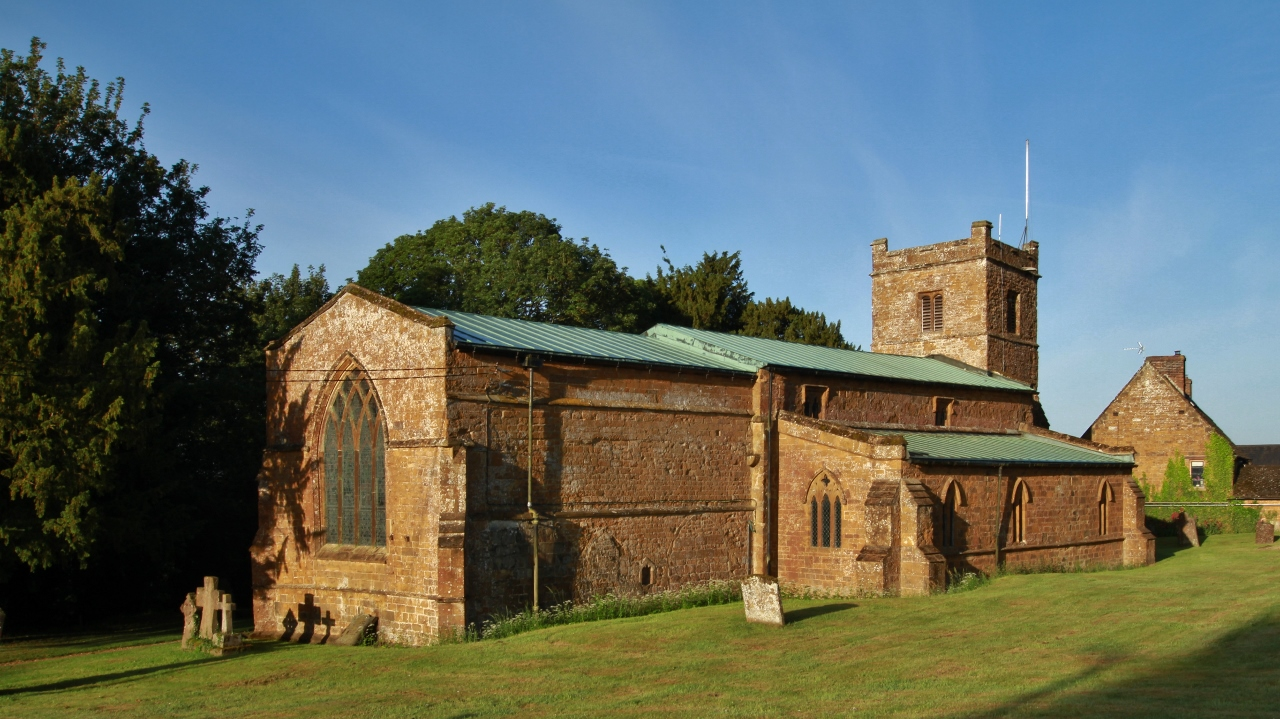
- All Saints' parish church

- Location within Oxfordshire
- Area: 5.89 km^{2} (2.27 sq mi)
- Population: 479 (2011 census)
  - Density: 81/km^{2} (210/sq mi)
- OS grid reference: SP4447
- Civil parish: Mollington
- District: Cherwell
- Shire county: Oxfordshire
- Region: South East
- Country: England
- Sovereign state: United Kingdom
- Post town: Banbury
- Postcode district: OX17
- Dialling code: 01295
- Police: Thames Valley
- Fire: Oxfordshire
- Ambulance: South Central
- UK Parliament: Banbury

Mollington is a village and civil parish about 4 miles (6.4 km) north of Banbury in Oxfordshire, England. The 2011 census recorded the parish's population as 479. It is situated in the far north of the county, on the border with Warwickshire.

== Toponym ==
An Anglo-Saxon will from AD 1015 records the toponym as Mollintun and the Domesday Book of 1086 records it as Molitone and Mollitone. An entry for 1220 in the Book of Fees records it as Mulinton and a pipe roll from 1230 records it in its modern form of Mollington. It is derived from Old English, meaning the tūn of Moll's people.

== Manor and governance ==
Æthelstan Ætheling, the eldest son of Æthelred the Unready, willed an estate at Mollington to his father in 1014 or 1015. The Domesday Book of 1086 records that by 1086 the manor was held by William d'Évreux, a kinsman of William the Conqueror.

In 1086 Mollington was partly in three counties: Oxfordshire, Warwickshire and Northamptonshire. Later the village was only in Oxfordshire and Warwickshire, and in 1895 the Warwickshire part was transferred to Oxfordshire by the Local Government Act 1894.

== Church and chapel ==
=== Church of England ===
The earliest parts of the Church of England parish church of All Saints date from the 14th century, but the font is 13th century so there may have been an earlier church building on the site. All Saints' has a north aisle which is linked to the nave by an arcade of four bays. The tower was built in the 16th century. There was a chapel on the north side of the chancel, but it was demolished in 1786. A blocked arch and doorway survive in the north wall of the chancel and a piscina can be seen from the outside.

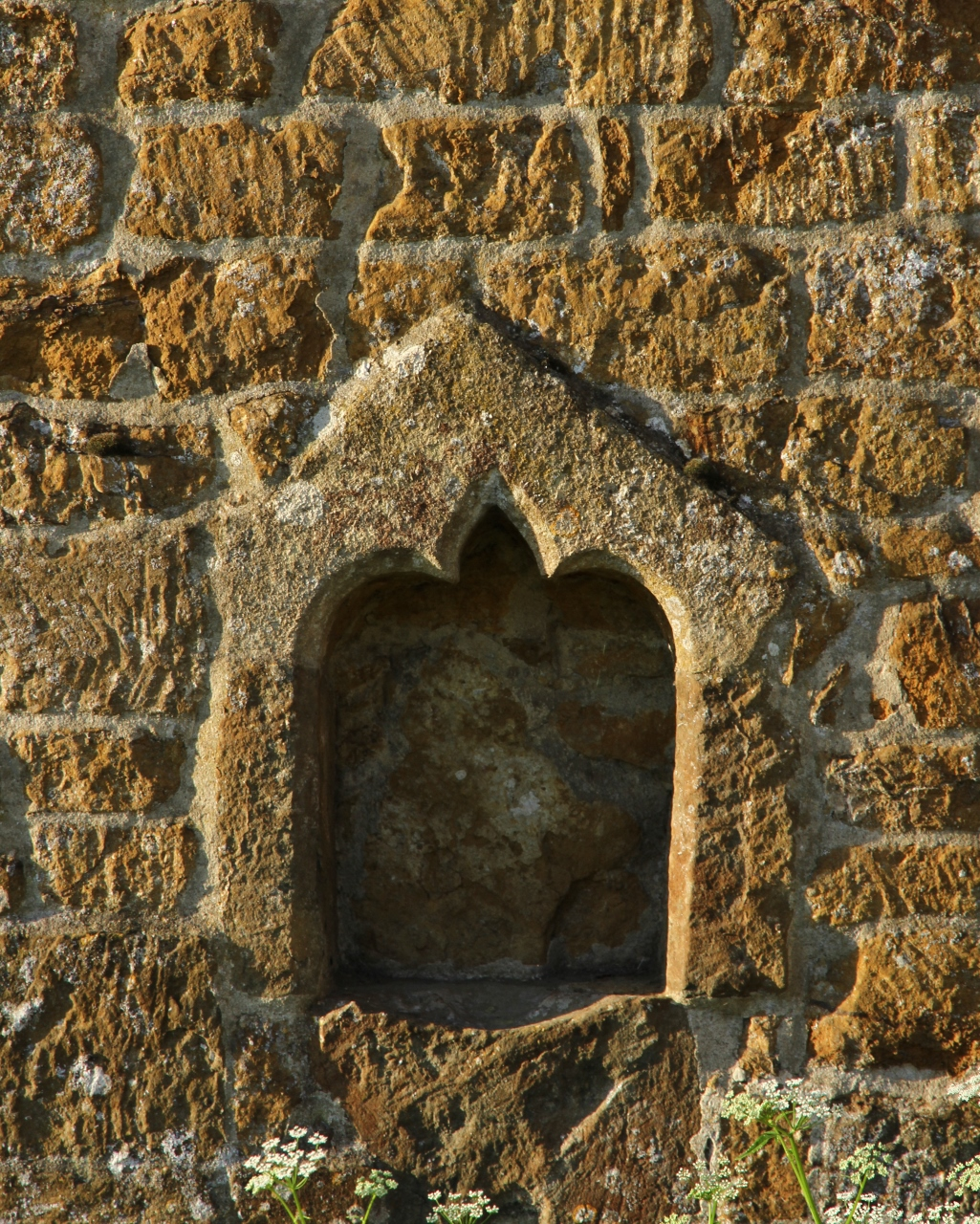
Piscina of the former north chapel of All Saints' parish church

The building was restored in 1856 under the direction of the Gothic Revival architect William White. All Saints' is a Grade II* listed building.

The tower has a ring of six bells. Henry I Bagley of Chacombe, Northamptonshire cast the fifth bell in 1631 and John Briant of Hertford cast the fourth bell in 1789. Mears and Stainbank of the Whitechapel Bell Foundry cast the third and tenor bells in 1875. The Whitechapel Bell Foundry cast the treble and second bells in 1981, completing the present ring. All Saints has also a Sanctus bell, cast by John Conyers of Yorkshire in about 1630. Conyers had two bell-foundries: one in Kingston upon Hull and the other in New Malton.

All Saints' parish is now part of the Benefice of Shires' Edge along with the parishes of Claydon, Cropredy, Great Bourton and Wardington.

=== Primitive Methodist and Brethren ===
In 1817 a private house in Mollington was registered for non-conformist worship. Houses were registered for Methodist worship in 1821 and 1828. A Primitive Methodist minister preached in Mollington in 1835, and a red brick chapel of that denomination was built in the village in 1845. It thrived the 1850s, 60s and 70s but declined in the first half of the 20th century, and was closed in 1947.

The chapel was bought in 1950 for Brethren worship, but closed again by 1969. It is now a private house.

== Social and economic history ==
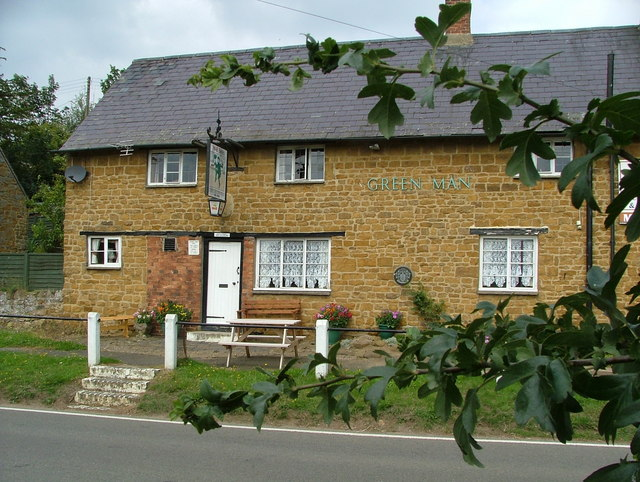
The Green Man public house

In 1872 a National School was built in the village. It was a Church of England school and was still open in 1996, but has since been closed.

Mollington used to have a post office.

A Point to point racing ground opened at Mollington in 1972. A number of hunt groups were based at the ground until its closure in 2007. It has since reopened with its first event on 7 May 2012.

== Amenities ==
Mollington has a public house, The Green Man, that was probably built in the middle of the 18th century. It also has a village hall and two children's playgrounds.

== Sources ==
- Crossley, Alan (ed.); Colvin, Christina; Cooper, Janet; Cooper, N.H.; Harvey, P.D.A.; Hollings, Marjory; Hook, Judith; Jessup, Mary; Lobel, Mary D.; Mason, J.F.A.; Trinder, B.S.; Turner, Hilary (1972). A History of the County of Oxford. Victoria County History. Vol. 10: Banbury Hundred. London: Oxford University Press for the Institute of Historical Research. pp. 197–206. ISBN 978-0-19722-728-2.
- Ekwall, Eilert (1960) [1936]. Concise Oxford Dictionary of English Place-Names (4th ed.). Oxford: Oxford University Press. Mollington. ISBN 0198691033.
- Sherwood, Jennifer; Pevsner, Nikolaus (1974). Oxfordshire. The Buildings of England. Harmondsworth: Penguin Books. pp. 710–711. ISBN 0-14-071045-0.
