= 2026 Cherwell District Council election =

2026 English local government election

- 7 May 2026

18 out of 48 seats to Cherwell District Council (including 2 by-elections) 25 seats needed for a majority
	First party	Second party	Third party
Leader	David Hingley	Edward Reeves	Amanda Watkins (retiring)
Party	Liberal Democrats	Conservative	Labour
Last election	17 seats, 28.3%	11 seats, 30.9%	13 seats, 25.3%
Seats before	17	12	11
Seats won	8	2	1
Seats after	21	8	8
Seat change	▲4	▼4	▼3
Popular vote	14,070	12,278	5,088
Percentage	24.5%	21.4%	8.9%
Swing	▼3.8%	▼9.5%	▼16.4%
	Fourth party	Fifth party	Sixth party
Leader	None	Ian Middleton	Les Sibley (Note: Leader of the Independent group.)
Party	Reform	Green	Independent
Last election	Did not stand	4 seats, 10.1%	3 seats, 5.3%
Seats before	0	4	4 (Note: Of the 4 Independent councillors, 2 sat in the Independent group, 1 sat with the Conservative group, and 1 sat with the Green group.)
Seats won	6	1	0
Seats after	6	4	1
Seat change	▲6	Steady	▼3
Popular vote	15,155	8,478	2,125
Percentage	26.4%	14.8%	3.7%
Swing	N/A	▲4.7%	▼1.6%
- Winner of each seat at the 2026 Cherwell District Council election.
Leader before election
David Hingley
Liberal Democrat
No overall control (Note: Liberal Democrat–Green minority coalition.)
Leader after election
Lesley McLean
Liberal Democrat
No overall control (Note: Liberal Democrat-Green coalition.)

The 2026 Cherwell District Council election was held on 7 May 2026, alongside the other local elections across the United Kingdom being held on the same day, to elect 16 of 48 members of Cherwell District Council in Oxfordshire, England.

Prior to the election, the council was under no overall control, being run by a minority coalition of the Liberal Democrats, Green Party and independent councillors, led by Liberal Democrat councillor David Hingley. Following the election, the council remained under no overall control, and the Liberal Democrats and Greens between them had over half the council's seats. David Hingley resigned as leader a few days after the election. At the subsequent annual council meeting on 20 May 2026, Liberal Democrat councillor Lesley McLean was appointed the new leader of the council, heading a Liberal Democrat and Green coalition.

== Summary ==
=== Background ===
In 2024, the council remained under no overall control.

=== Council composition ===
After 2024 election		Before 2026 election	
Party	Seats	Party	Seats
Liberal Democrats	17	Liberal Democrats	17
Conservative	11	Conservative	12
Labour	13	Labour	11
Green	4	Green	4
Independent	3	Independent	4

Changes 2024–2026:

- March 2025: Matt Hodgson (Labour), Andrew McHugh (Conservative) and Sean Woodcock (Labour) resign – by-elections held May 2025
- May 2025:
  - Henry Elugwu (Labour) and Zoe McLernon (Conservative) win by-elections; Fiaz Ahmed (Conservative) gains by-election from Labour
  - Donna Ford (Conservative) leaves party to sit as an independent
- September 2025: Chukwudi Okeke (Labour) joins Conservatives

=== Election result ===
2026 Cherwell District Council election
Party	This election				Full council			This election		
Party	Candidates	Seats	Net	Seats %	Other	Total	Total %	Votes	Votes %	+/−
Liberal Democrats	{{{candidates}}}	8	▲4	44.4	13	21	43.8	14,070	24.5	–3.8
Conservative	{{{candidates}}}	2	▼4	11.1	6	8	16.7	12,278	21.4	–9.5
Labour	{{{candidates}}}	1	▼3	5.6	7	8	16.7	5,088	8.9	–16.4
Reform	{{{candidates}}}	6	▲6	33.3	0	6	12.5	15,155	26.4	N/A
Green	{{{candidates}}}	1	Steady	5.6	3	4	8.3	8,478	14.8	+4.7
Independent	{{{candidates}}}	0	▼3	0.0	1	1	2.1	2,125	3.7	–1.6
Animal Welfare	{{{candidates}}}	0	Steady	0.0	0	0	0.0	89	0.2	N/A
SDP	{{{candidates}}}	0	Steady	0.0	0	0	0.0	35	0.1	N/A

== Incumbents ==
Ward	Incumbent councillor	Party	Re-standing
Adderbury, Bloxham & Bodicote	David Hingley	Liberal Democrats	Yes
Banbury Calthorpe & Easington	Ian Harwood	Conservative	Yes
Banbury Cross & Neithrop	Chukwudi Okeke (Note: Originally elected as Labour, but later defected to the Conservatives.)	Conservative	Yes
Banbury Grimsbury & Hightown	Rebecca Biegel	Labour	Yes
Banbury Hardwick	Andrew Crichton	Labour	Yes
Banbury Ruscote	Amanda Watkins	Labour	No
Bicester East	Donna Ford	Independent	Yes
Bicester North & Caversfield	Nicholas Mawer	Conservative	Yes
Bicester South & Ambrosden	Chris Pruden	Liberal Democrats	Yes
Bicester West	John Broad	Independent	No
Cropredy, Sibfords & Wroxton	Phil Chapman	Conservative	No
Deddington	Edward Reeves	Conservative	Yes
Fringford & Heyfords	Barry Wood	Conservative	No
Kidlington East	Fiona Mawson	Green	Yes
Kidlington West	Jean Conway	Liberal Democrats	Yes (Note: Standing in Fringford & Heyfords ward.)
Launton & Otmoor	Gemma Coton	Liberal Democrats	No

== Ward results ==
=== Adderbury, Bloxham & Bodicote ===
Adderbury, Bloxham & Bodicote
Party	Candidate	Votes	%	±%
Liberal Democrats	David Hingley*	1,275	32.6	–8.1
Conservative	James Edsberg	1,071	27.5	–6.2
Reform	David Collingwood-Turner	966	24.8	N/A
Green	Linda Newbery	333	8.5	+1.3
Labour	Helen Oldfield	253	6.5	–11.6
Majority		204	5.2	–2.0
Rejected ballots		8	0.2	N/A
Turnout		3,906	48.0	+13.3
Registered electors		8,140		
Liberal Democrats hold		Swing	▼1.0	

=== Banbury Calthorpe & Easington ===
Banbury Calthorpe & Easington (2 seats due to by-election)
Party	Candidate	Votes	%	±%
Conservative	Ian Harwood* (Note: Harwood was elected for a full four year term.)	1,294	32.5	–7.4
Reform	John Brown (Note: Brown was elected in the by-election to the vacant seat for a one year term.)	1,232	30.9	N/A
Reform	Mark Naden	1,105	27.7	N/A
Conservative	Luke Whitehouse	1,042	26.1	–13.8
Green	Sam Burnett	802	20.1	+12.5
Green	Alex Leonova	760	19.1	+11.5
Labour	Andrew Eaton	600	15.1	–24.1
Labour	Helen Mears	546	13.7	–25.5
Liberal Democrats	David Pallot	243	6.1	–0.3
Liberal Democrats	Jacqui Smith	241	6.0	–0.4
Independent	Phil Richards	108	2.7	N/A
Rejected ballots		8	0.2	N/A
Turnout		~4,118	45.1	+12.4
Registered electors		9,131		
Conservative hold				
Reform gain from Labour				

=== Banbury Cross & Neithrop ===
Banbury Cross & Neithrop
Party	Candidate	Votes	%	±%
Reform	Yvonne Greene	713	26.6	N/A
Labour	Jose Omekandji	644	24.0	–24.3
Green	Jake Howard	510	19.0	+9.4
Conservative	Chuk Okeke*	479	17.8	–6.4
Liberal Democrats	Rebecca Bell	197	7.3	+1.1
Independent	Simon Garrett	133	5.0	–6.4
Majority		69	2.6	N/A
Rejected ballots		9	0.3	N/A
Turnout		2,685	35.4	+9.6
Registered electors		7,591		
Reform gain from Conservative				

=== Banbury Grimsbury & Hightown ===
Banbury Grimsbury & Hightown
Party	Candidate	Votes	%	±%
Labour Co-op	Rebecca Biegel*	685	27.6	–17.1
Reform	Chris Wiseman	596	24.0	N/A
Conservative	Koppany Nagy	456	18.4	–2.1
Green	Jack Vere	425	17.1	+7.8
Liberal Democrats	Sean Murray	176	7.1	–6.4
Independent	Cassi Bellingham	146	5.9	–6.1
Majority		89	3.6	–20.4
Rejected ballots		9	0.4	N/A
Turnout		2,493	34.6	+8.4
Registered electors		7,198		
Labour Co-op hold				

=== Banbury Hardwick ===
Banbury Hardwick
Party	Candidate	Votes	%	±%
Reform	Paul Jeffreys	950	34.8	N/A
Labour Co-op	Andrew Crichton*	701	25.7	–24.5
Green	Simi Cumberbatch	453	16.6	+5.3
Conservative	Taraji Ogunnubi	371	13.6	–18.8
Liberal Democrats	Michael Offei	257	9.4	+3.3
Majority		249	9.1	N/A
Turnout		2,732	35.0	+12.2
Registered electors		7,831		
Reform gain from Labour Co-op				

=== Banbury Ruscote ===
Banbury Ruscote
Party	Candidate	Votes	%	±%
Reform	Mark Gorman	750	35.4	N/A
Labour Co-op	Chloe Smith	540	25.5	–33.1
Green	Karl Kwiatkowski	313	14.8	+8.4
Conservative	Nikki Payne	300	14.2	–6.2
Independent	Julie Battison	119	5.6	–3.6
Liberal Democrats	Kai Smith	96	4.5	–0.9
Majority		210	9.9	N/A
Turnout		2,118	28.5	+7.9
Registered electors		7,460		
Reform gain from Labour Co-op				

=== Bicester East ===
Bicester East
Party	Candidate	Votes	%	±%
Liberal Democrats	Bryonie Wells	919	35.2	–3.9
Reform	Andrew O'Gorman	719	27.5	N/A
Conservative	Alex Thrupp	361	13.8	–16.5
Independent	Donna Ford*	348	13.3	N/A
Green	Amanda Maguire	263	10.1	–1.9
Majority		200	7.7	–1.1
Turnout		2,610	40.9	+10.8
Registered electors		6,398		
Liberal Democrats gain from Independent				

=== Bicester North & Caversfield ===
Bicester North & Caversfield
Party	Candidate	Votes	%	±%
Liberal Democrats	Julius Parker	1,006	36.0	–1.5
Conservative	Nicholas Mawer*	701	25.1	–7.3
Reform	Alan Thomas	686	24.5	N/A
Green	Robin Winslow	310	11.1	+2.9
Labour	Babatunde Aribisala	92	3.3	–18.7
Majority		305	10.9	+5.8
Turnout		2,795	41.3	+12.7
Registered electors		6,783		
Liberal Democrats gain from Conservative		Swing	▲2.9	

=== Bicester South & Ambrosden ===
Bicester South & Ambrosden
Party	Candidate	Votes	%	±%
Liberal Democrats	Chris Pruden*	1,680	41.2	–8.3
Reform	Tom Burgess	882	21.6	N/A
Conservative	Shams Ud-din	670	16.4	–9.2
Green	Damien Maguire	641	15.7	+6.9
Labour	Sarah Farrow	203	5.0	–11.1
Majority		798	19.6	–4.3
Turnout		4,076	36.8	+12.3
Registered electors		11,102		
Liberal Democrats hold				

=== Bicester West ===
Bicester West (2 seats due to by-election)
Party	Candidate	Votes	%	±%
Reform	Michael Wilson	753	28.0	N/A
Reform	George Popescu	741	27.6	N/A
Independent	Dan Hallett	625	23.2	–35.8
Green	Claire Brenner	600	22.3	+18.7
Independent	Jasmine Webb-Majnlund	590	21.9	–37.1
Liberal Democrats	Naomi Crookston	583	21.7	+12.7
Liberal Democrats	Matt Webb	535	19.9	+10.9
Green	Tim Lobanov	328	12.2	+8.6
Conservative	Marco Caso	275	10.2	–2.5
Conservative	Andrew McHugh	258	9.6	–3.1
Animal Welfare	Paul Graham	89	3.3	N/A
Turnout		~2,759	41.6	+12.6
Registered electors		6,633		
Reform gain from Independent				
Reform gain from Independent				

=== Cropredy, Sibfords & Wroxton ===
Cropredy, Sibfords & Wroxton
Party	Candidate	Votes	%	±%
Liberal Democrats	Nicola Borkmann	1,151	30.8	–16.8
Conservative	Mitch Lee	1,122	30.0	–8.3
Reform	Matthew Taylor	948	25.4	N/A
Green	Rachel Payne	258	6.9	N/A
Labour	Anne Cullen	221	5.9	–8.2
SDP	Michael Clyne	35	0.9	N/A
Majority		29	0.8	–8.5
Turnout		3,735	52.6	+12.7
Registered electors		7,130		
Liberal Democrats gain from Conservative		Swing	▼4.3	

=== Deddington ===
Deddington
Party	Candidate	Votes	%	±%
Conservative	Eddie Reeves*	1,294	32.5	–2.3
Liberal Democrats	James Hartley	1,173	29.4	+16.8
Reform	Gail Collingwood-Turner	885	22.2	N/A
Green	Aaron Bliss	333	8.4	–2.0
Labour	Annette Murphy	300	7.5	–25.7
Majority		121	3.1	–7.5
Turnout		3,985	52.2	+14.0
Registered electors		7,649		
Conservative hold		Swing	▼9.6	

=== Fringford & Heyfords ===
Fringford & Heyfords
Party	Candidate	Votes	%	±%
Liberal Democrats	Jean Conway*	1,372	39.5	–5.1
Reform	John Honey	876	25.2	N/A
Conservative	Sandy Dallimore	868	25.0	–11.2
Green	Chris Nelson	360	10.4	+1.0
Majority		496	14.3	+5.9
Turnout		3,476	44.7	+9.0
Registered electors		7,805		
Liberal Democrats gain from Conservative				

=== Kidlington East ===
Kidlington East
Party	Candidate	Votes	%	±%
Green	Fiona Mawson*	1,053	35.2	–8.5
Reform	Adie Spittle	745	24.9	N/A
Liberal Democrats	Gabriel Schenk	495	16.5	–0.6
Conservative	John Colegrave	476	15.9	–7.5
Labour	Gergory Fish	167	5.6	–10.2
Independent	Julian Tytherleigh	56	1.9	N/A
Majority		308	10.3	–10.0
Turnout		2,992	42.2	+9.3
Registered electors		7,133		
Green hold				

=== Kidlington West ===
Kidlington West
Party	Candidate	Votes	%	±%
Liberal Democrats	Lisa Smith	1,427	45.1	–8.0
Reform	Dave Paintin	734	23.2	N/A
Conservative	Martin Phillips	548	17.3	–7.7
Green	Amanda Carpenter	457	14.4	+4.7
Majority		693	21.9	–6.2
Turnout		3,166	44.7	+11.9
Registered electors		7,112		
Liberal Democrats hold				

=== Launton & Otmoor ===
Launton & Otmoor
Party	Candidate	Votes	%	±%
Liberal Democrats	Timothy Faltermeyer	1,244	38.6	–4.2
Reform	Ian Hodgson	874	27.1	N/A
Conservative	Andrew Payne	692	21.5	–17.2
Green	John O'Regan	279	8.7	+2.7
Labour	Naomi Karslake	136	4.2	–8.3
Majority		370	11.5	+7.4
Turnout		3,225	48.8	+11.2
Registered electors		6,640		
Liberal Democrats hold				

== By-elections ==
=== Kidlington West ===
Kidlington West by-election: 16 July 2026
Party	Candidate	Votes	%	±%
Liberal Democrats	Rob Packard	1,028	58.8	+13.7
Reform	Dave Paintin	331	18.9	−4.3
Conservative	Chuk Okeke	232	13.3	–4.0
Green	Jenny Tamblyn	158	9.0	−5.4
Majority		697	39.8	+17.9
Turnout		1,749	24.5	−20.2
Registered electors		7,112		
Liberal Democrats hold		Swing	▲9.0	
