= Bourton, Cherwell =

Coordinates: 52.10°N 1.35°W

Bourton
- Civil parish
- Location within Oxfordshire
- Civil parish: Bourton
- District: Cherwell
- Shire county: Oxfordshire
- Region: South East
- Country: England
- Sovereign state: United Kingdom
- Post town: Banbury
- Postcode district: OX17
- Dialling code: 01295
- Police: Thames Valley
- Fire: Oxfordshire
- Ambulance: South Central
- UK Parliament: Banbury

Bourton is a civil parish in the Cherwell district of Oxfordshire, England, including Great Bourton and Little Bourton. According to the 2011 census it had a population of 614 across its total area of 6.98 km^{2}. The villages are about three miles north of Banbury.

== Freedom of the Parish ==
The following people and military units have received the Freedom of the Parish of Bourton.

=== Individuals ===
- Sally Leszczynski: 31 January 2022.
