= Cropredy Methodist Church =

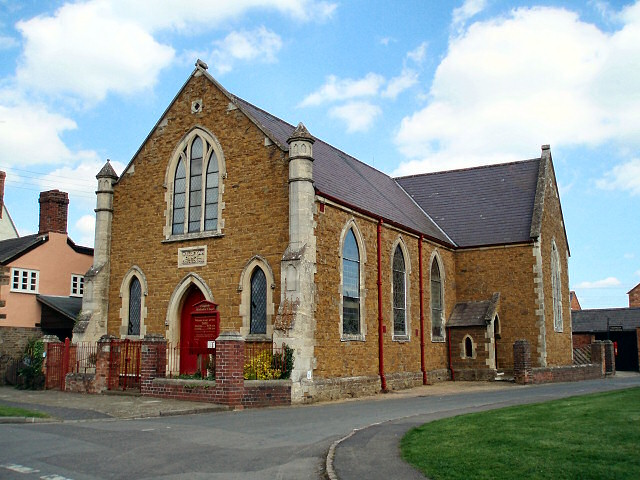
- Cropredy Methodist Church
- Cropredy Methodist Church
- 52°07′04″N 1°19′02″W
- OS grid reference: SP 46846 46824
- Location: Cropredy, Oxfordshire
- Country: England
- Denomination: Wesleyan Methodist

Architecture
- Architect: Edward Pincher
- Groundbreaking: 18 April 1881
- Completed: 26 August 1881
- Construction cost: £1,000 (equivalent to £105,100 in 2025)

Specifications
- Capacity: 200 persons

Cropredy Methodist Church is a Methodist church in the village of Cropredy, Oxfordshire, England.

== History ==
The Wesleyan congregation in Cropredy was established around 1822, but by the early 1880s had outgrown its first chapel.

A new chapel was planned and the foundation stones were laid on Easter Monday 18 April 1881 The architect was Edward Pincher of West Bromwich and the chapel with a seating capacity of 200 was completed by August of the same year. The builder was Thomas Cherry of Cropredy, supervised by Caleb Mander of Banbury. The opening service was held on 26 August 1881 when the sermon was preached by Rev. F.J. Sharr of London.

== Organ ==
A specification of the organ can be found on the National Pipe Organ Register.
