= Wardington =

Village in Oxfordshire, England

Coordinates: 52.114°N 1.284°W

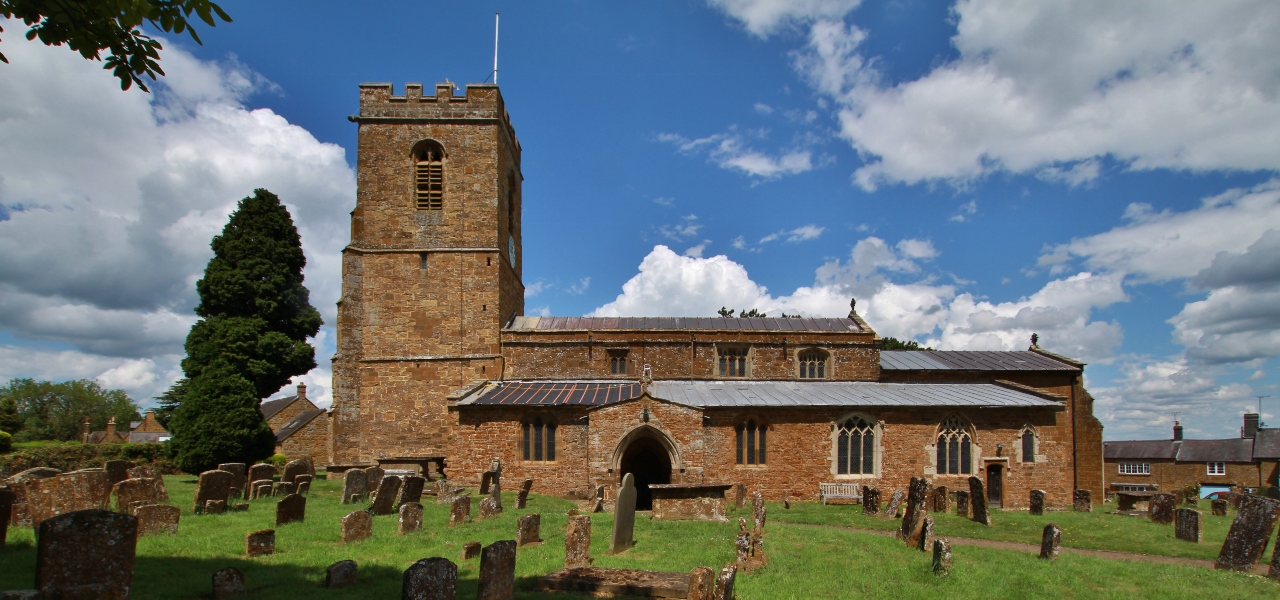
- St Mary Magdalene parish church

- Location within Oxfordshire
- Area: 11.11 km^{2} (4.29 sq mi)
- Population: 602 (parish, including Williamscot) (2011 Census)
  - Density: 54/km^{2} (140/sq mi)
- OS grid reference: SP4946
- Civil parish: Wardington
- District: Cherwell
- Shire county: Oxfordshire
- Region: South East
- Country: England
- Sovereign state: United Kingdom
- Post town: Banbury
- Postcode district: OX17
- Dialling code: 01295
- Police: Thames Valley
- Fire: Oxfordshire
- Ambulance: South Central
- UK Parliament: Banbury
- Website: Wardington.net the website of Wardington, Williamscot and Coton

Wardington is a village and civil parish in Oxfordshire, about 4 miles (6.4 km) northeast of Banbury. The village consists of two parts: Wardington and Upper Wardington. The village is on a stream that rises in Upper Wardington and flows north to join the River Cherwell.

The parish includes the hamlet of Williamscot, about 1 mile (1.6 km) southwest of Wardington. The parish is bounded to the west and north by the River Cherwell, to the south by a stream that joins the Cherwell, and to the northeast by field boundaries. Its northeastern and southern boundaries also form part of the county boundary with Northamptonshire. The 2011 Census recorded the parish's population as 602.

== Toponym ==
A hundred roll from AD 1279 records the toponym as Wardinton. Its etymology is Old English but its meaning is uncertain. "Ward" may be derived from a person called Wearda, or it may be from the Old English wearde or wearda meaning a beacon or cairn. The suffix -ingtūn is very common in Old and Middle English but its meaning is disputed.

== Manor ==
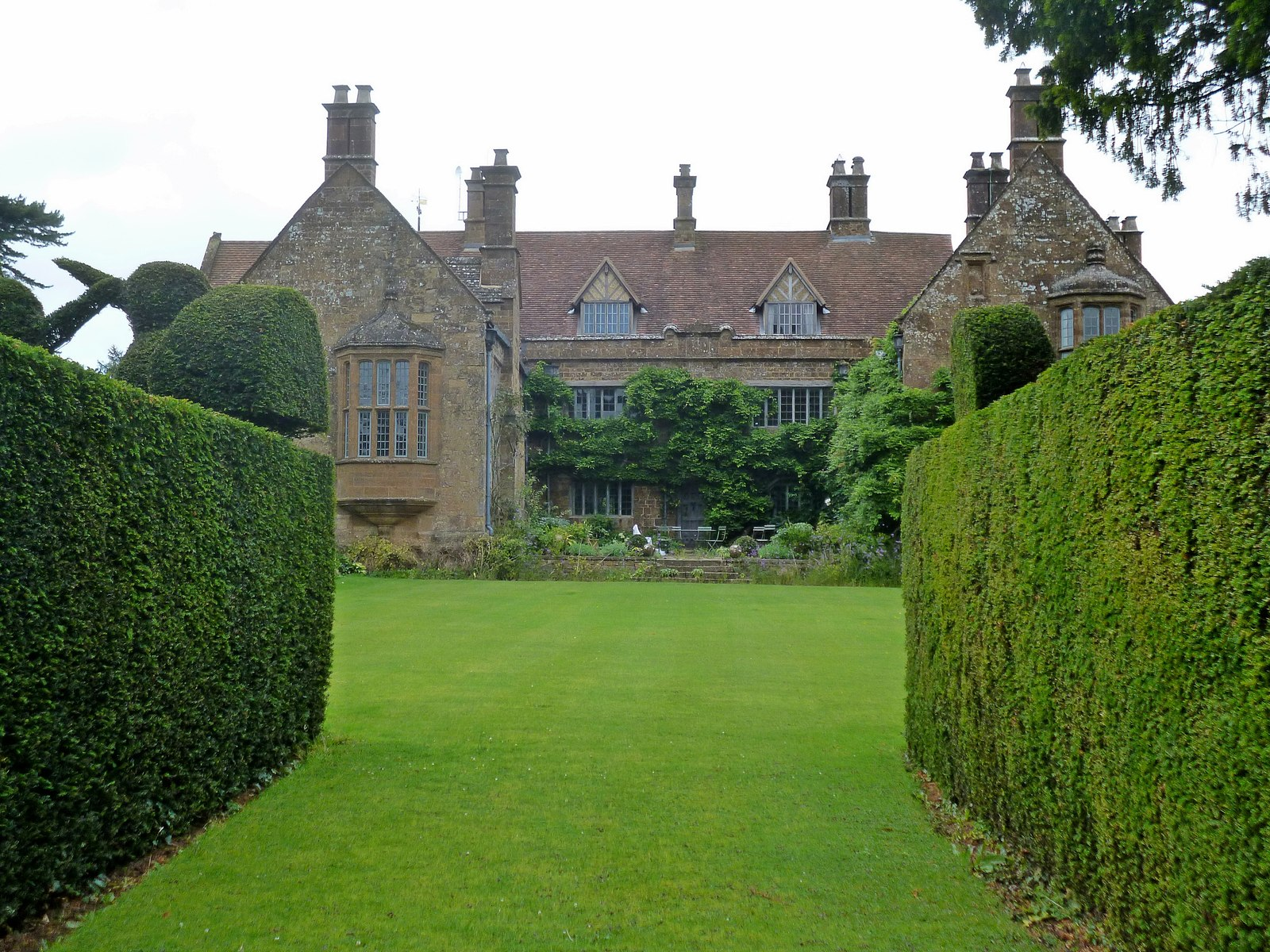
Wardington Manor in 2015

The Domesday Book of 1086 records Wardington as part of the Cropredy manor of Remigius de Fécamp, Bishop of Lincoln.

Between Wardington and Upper Wardington is Wardington Manor house, which dates from the middle of the 16th century or possibly earlier. The house was remodelled in 1665 and twice early in the 20th century. From 1917 Wardington Manor was the seat of Baron Wardington. In 2004 the house was severely damaged by fire but it has since been restored. It is a Grade II* listed building.

== Church and chapel ==
=== Church of England ===
The Church of England parish church of Saint Mary Magdalene has a 12th-century chancel and 13th-century nave. In the 14th century new Decorated Gothic windows were added to the chancel. In the 15th century a Perpendicular Gothic clerestory was added to the nave and a west tower was built.

Monuments in the church include two 14th-century tomb recesses and a 14th-century slab with a foliated cross. There is a 15th-century monumental brass to Henry Freebody, who died in 1444. In the south chapel is an 18th-century monument to George Denton, who died in 1757.

The church was restored in 1887 and 1889 under the direction of the Gothic Revival architect Ewan Christian, and again in 1912–14 under the direction of WT Loveday. St Margaret's is a Grade I listed building.

The tower has a ring of six bells. Henry I Bagley of Chacombe cast the oldest in 1669, Henry II Bagley cast the tenor bell in 1682 and Henry II and Matthew I Bagley cast the treble bell in 1685. John Briant of Hertford cast two more of the bells in 1791 and 1795. John Taylor cast the youngest bell in 1841, presumably at his then foundry in Oxford.

St Mary Magdalene parish is now part of the Benefice of Shires' Edge along with those of Claydon, Cropredy, Great Bourton and Mollington.

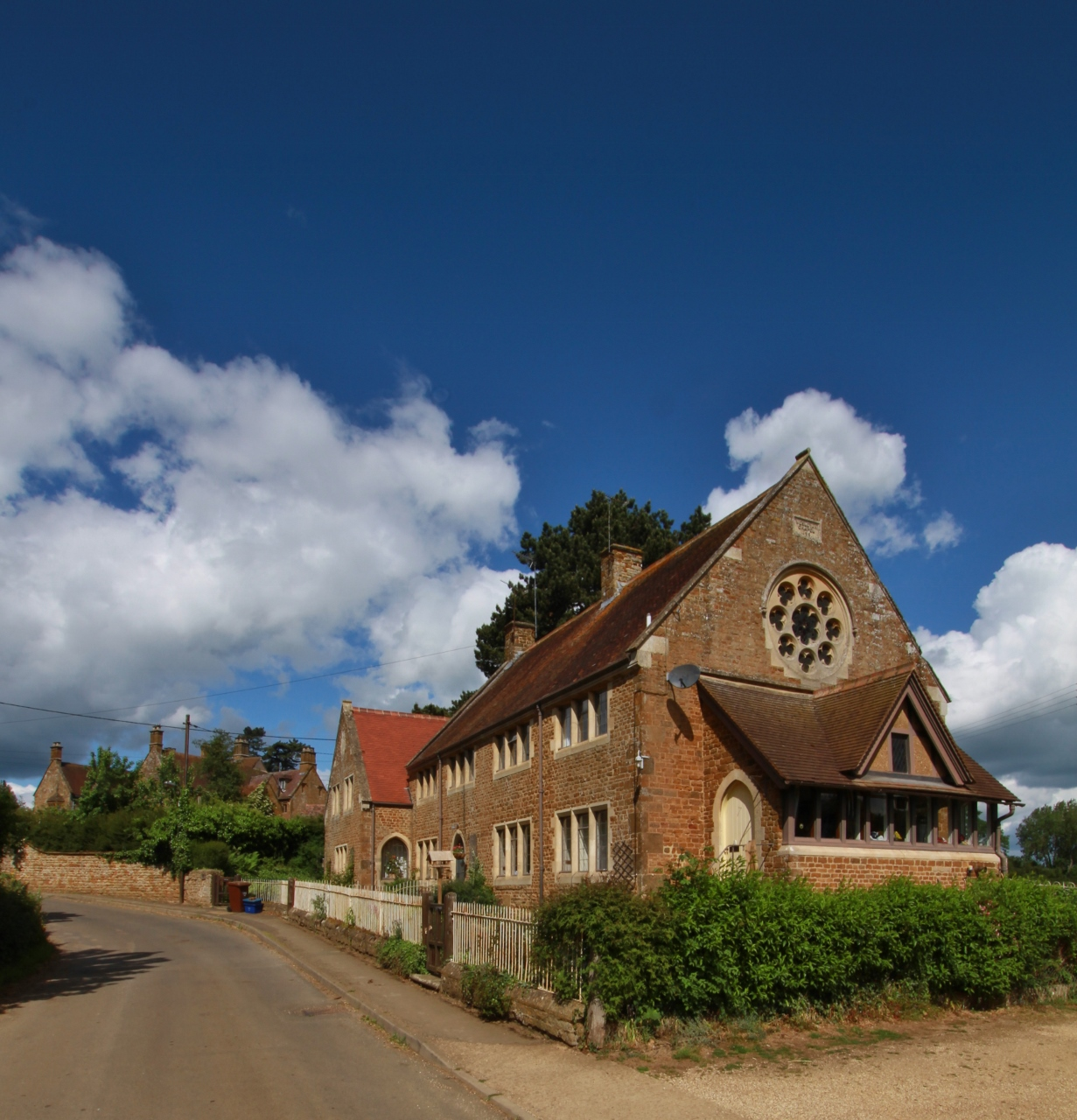
Former Wesleyan chapel in Upper Wardington

=== Methodist ===
A congregation of Wesleyans was established in the village by 1815 and had built a chapel by 1827. In 1895 a larger chapel was built in a Gothic Revival style next to the old one, which was sold to the owner of the manor house. The chapel was part of the Methodist Union of 1932, and was still open as part of Banbury Methodist Circuit in 1964. It has since closed and been converted into private homes.

== Social and economic history ==
In 1469 in the Wars of the Roses the Battle of Edgecote Moor was fought near Wardington. In 1644 in the English Civil War the Battle of Cropredy Bridge was fought across the parishes of Bourton, Cropredy, Prescote and Wardington. The site is now on the Register of Historic Battlefields.

Williamscot House is Elizabethan, built for Walter Calcott in about 1568. A Queene Anne style wing was added in 1704 and extended in Georgian style in 1777. The Elizabethan part of the house is now Grade II* listed.

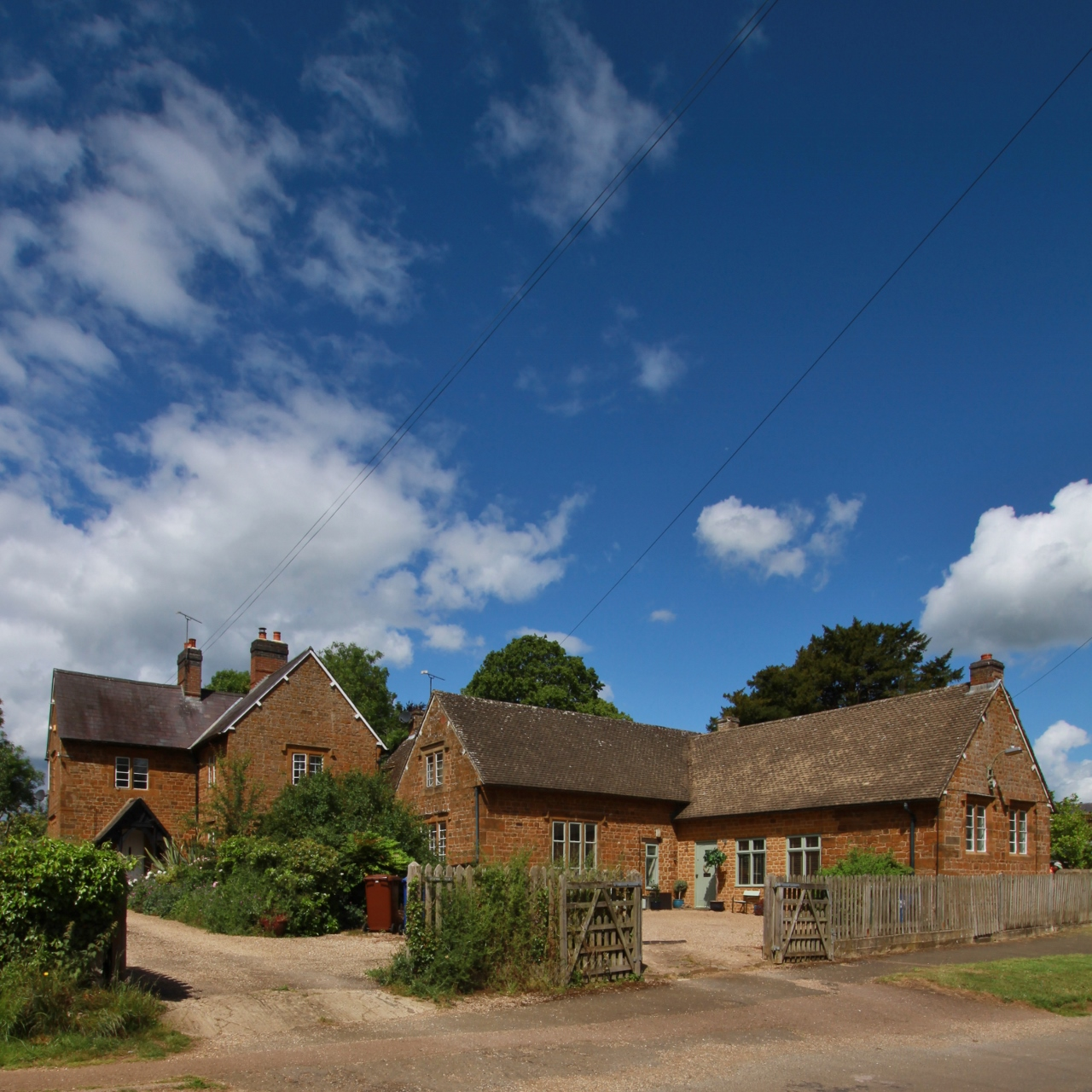
Former parish school in Wardington, closed in 1991 and now a private house

From 1574 Wardington was served by the Free School northeast of Williamscot House. The Free School was closed in 1857 but the building survives. By 1833 a school had been established at Wardington itself. This became a National School and acquired its own purpose-built premises in 1845. After 1947 it became a primary school, with children older than 11 being schooled in Banbury. The school was closed in 1991 and is now a private house.

In 1753 Wardington had three public houses: the Green Man, the Hare and Hounds and the Wheatsheaf, also called the White Swan and the White Lion. The Green Man seems to have ceased trading by 1787. In 1966 Upper Wardington had two public houses: the Plough and the Red Lion. Today only the Hare and Hounds remains in business, as the others have been converted into private homes.

In 1900 the Great Central Railway's branch line between Culworth and Banbury was built through the southern edge of Wardington parish. In 1911 the railway opened Chalcombe Road Halt more than a mile south of the village on Wardington Road. British Railways closed the halt in 1956 and the line in 1966.

Wardington Memorial Hall was built in 1920 as a monument to members of the village who were killed serving in the First World War.

== Amenities ==
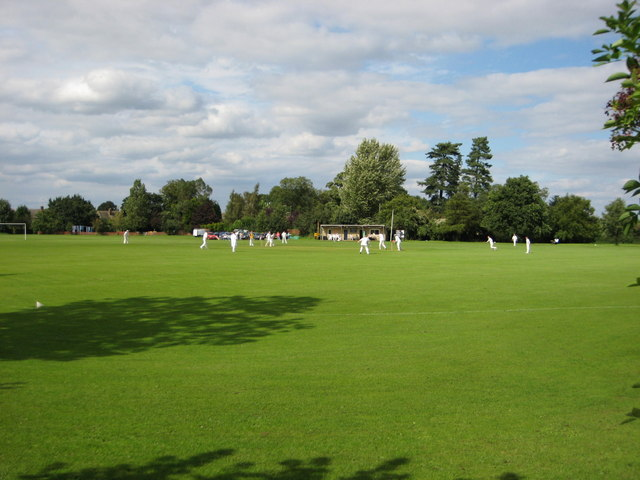
Wardington Cricket Club playing a home game

Wardington has only one public house, The Hare and Hounds, controlled by Hook Norton Brewery.

Wardington Cricket Club plays in South Northants Cricket League Division four.

== Transport ==
The A361 road runs through Wardington, with some sharp bends where there has been a number of crashes. Northamptonshire County Council's Transport Prioritisation Framework includes plans for an A361 bypass of Wardington, Chipping Warden and Byfield.

Since 2011 Stagecoach in Oxfordshire has operated bus route 200 between Banbury and Daventry via Wardington, running hourly from Mondays to Saturdays. There is no Sunday or bank holiday service.

Until 2011 Geoff Amos Coaches of Eydon had run a Monday to Saturday bus service between Rugby and Banbury via Daventry and Wardington. In April 2011 Northamptonshire County Council reduced its English National Concessionary Travel Scheme payment to bus operators from 53 pence to 38 pence per passenger and Geoff Amos Coaches warned that this would threaten the viability of its bus services. On 4 August 2011 Geoff Amos Coaches announced the withdrawal of its scheduled bus services with effect from 5 August until further notice.

== Sources ==
- Crossley, Alan (ed.); Colvin, Christina; Cooper, Janet; Cooper, NH; Harvey, PDA; Hollings, Marjory; Hook, Judith; Jessup, Mary; Lobel, Mary D.; Mason, JFA; Trinder, BS; Turner, Hilary (1972). A History of the County of Oxford. Victoria County History. Vol. 10: Banbury Hundred. London: Oxford University Press for the Institute of Historical Research. pp. 210–225. ISBN 978-0-19722-728-2.
- Ekwall, Eilert (1960) [1936]. Concise Oxford Dictionary of English Place-Names (4th ed.). Oxford: Oxford University Press. Wardington. ISBN 0198691033.
- MRC McLean Hazel (2006). Northamptonshire Transport Strategy for Growth – Transport Prioritisation Framework. Northampton: Northamptonshire County Council. pp. 71–77.
- Sherwood, Jennifer; Pevsner, Nikolaus (1974). Oxfordshire. The Buildings of England. Harmondsworth: Penguin Books. pp. 822–825. ISBN 0-14-071045-0.
