= J. J. Leeming =

British civil and traffic engineer

John Joseph Leeming
- Born: 1899
- Died: 1981 (aged 81–82)
- Engineering career
- Discipline: civil engineer; traffic engineer
- Employers: Oxfordshire County Council 1924–46; Dorset County Council 1946–64
- Projects: Abingdon Bridge rebuilding
- Significant advance: accident analysis pioneer

John Joseph Leeming (1899 – 1981) was a British civil engineer and traffic engineer. He forwarded controversial ideas for the causes of, and remedies for, road traffic accidents (RTAs), including the notion that drivers should not always be assumed to be at fault.

== Biography ==
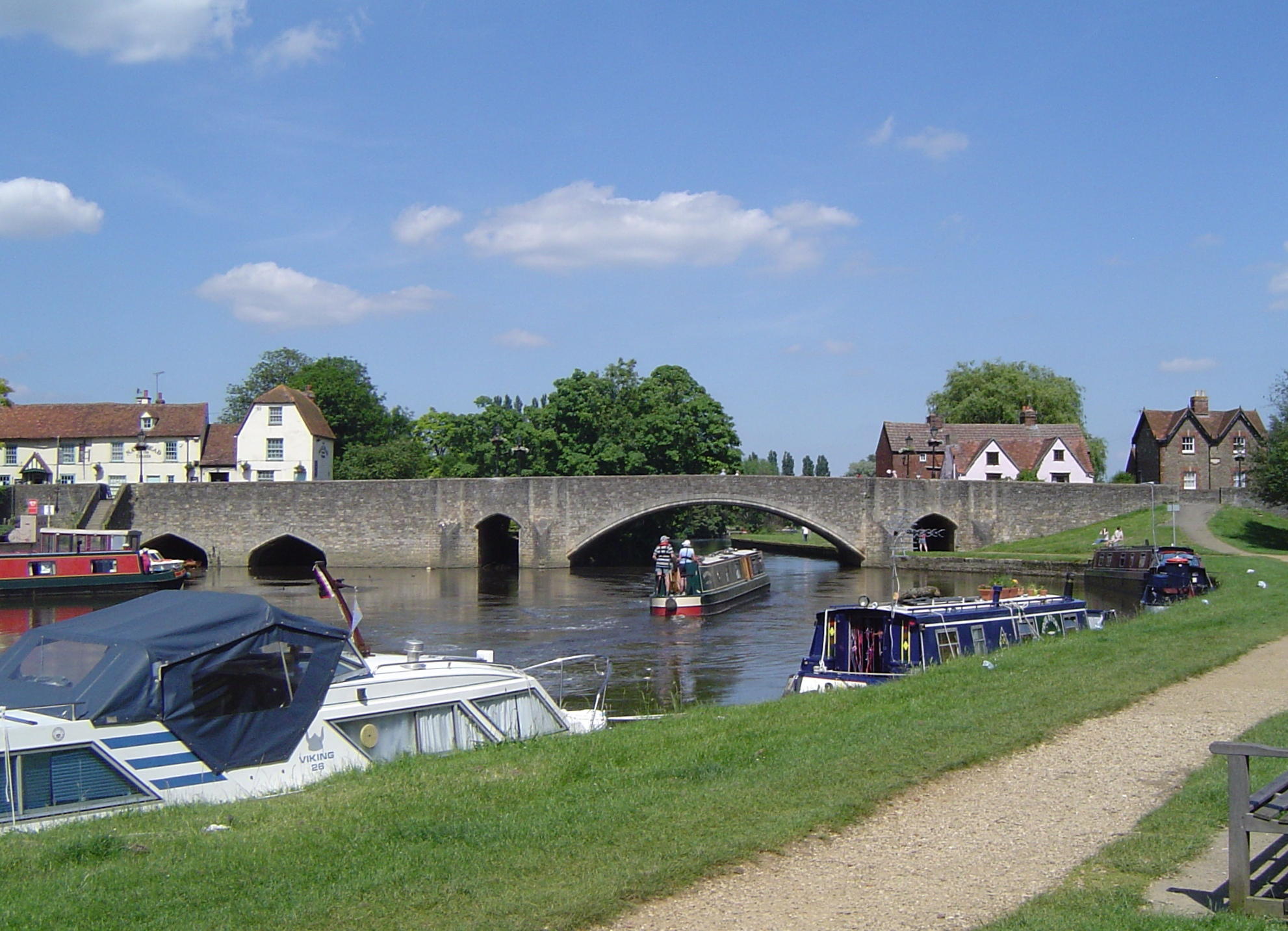
Abingdon Bridge over the River Thames, showing the wide span that Leeming designed to ease navigation

Leeming was born in 1899 and served in the First World War. From 1924 he worked in various road engineering capacities for Oxfordshire County Council, latterly as deputy county surveyor until he left for Dorset in 1946. Leeming supervised the rebuilding of some historic bridges in Oxfordshire and what was then Berkshire, including Abingdon Bridge in 1927, Cropredy Bridge in 1937 and Shilton Bridge in 1938. He wrote or co-wrote articles about these bridges that were published in the Oxford Architectural and Historical Society's journal Oxoniensia.

In 1946 Leeming moved to work for Dorset County Council as county surveyor, where he stayed until his retirement in 1964. In this period he pioneered road accident investigation. In 1969 his book Road Accidents: prevent or punish? was published. A 2007 review of a reprint of the book described it as controversial, and as being written by an "enlightened highways expert".

The National Motor Museum at Beaulieu, Hampshire holds an archive of Leeming's papers covering the period 1959–72.

== Road traffic accident causes ==
In Road Accidents: prevent or punish? Leeming set out his ideas and views of the causes of road traffic casualties (RTCs), and of how best they can be tackled. The book is described as attacking the beginnings of the blame culture, with Leeming convinced that RTCs could be reduced by using road engineering methods based on evidence derived from the scientific analysis of the causes of RTAs, and that drivers were not the main cause of many road safety problems.

== Other observations ==
=== Induced demand ===
Leeming described the phenomenon of induced demand, with respect to road traffic volumes:

Motorways and bypasses generate traffic, that is, produce extra traffic, partly by inducing people to travel who would not otherwise have done so by making the new route more convenient than the old, partly by people who go out of their direct route to enjoy the greater convenience of the new road, and partly by people who use the towns bypassed because they are more convenient for shopping and visits when through traffic has been removed.

=== Risk compensation ===
The risk compensation principle, upon which Hans Monderman's counter-intuitive shared space concept is founded, was described by Leeming:

It can safely be said that places which look dangerous do not have accidents, or very few. They happen at places which do not look dangerous. The reason for this is simple. The motorist is as intelligent as the ‘local people’. If a place looks dangerous, he can see that it is so, he takes care and there are no accidents.

== See also ==
- John Adams (geographer)

== Works ==
- Leeming, J.J. (1940). "Shilton Bridge" (PDF). Oxoniensia. V. Oxford Architectural and Historical Society: 170.
- Leeming, J.J. (1951). Road curvature and superelevation. London: Contractors' Record and Municipal Engineering.
- Leeming, J.J. (1963). Statistical Methods for Engineers. Glasgow and London: Blackie and Son.
- Leeming, J.J. (2007) [1969]. Road Accidents: prevent or punish?. Oswestry (reprint) and London (original): Quinta Press (reprint), Cassell (original). ISBN 978-1-897856-29-1. SBN 304932132.
- Leeming, J.J.; Salter, H.E. (1937). "Burford Bridge, Abingdon" (PDF). Oxoniensia. II. Oxford Architectural and Historical Society: 134–140.
- Toynbee, M.R.; Leeming, J.J. (1938). "Cropredy Bridge" (PDF). Oxoniensia. III. Oxford Architectural and Historical Society: 123–138.
