= Battle of Cropredy Bridge =

1644 battle of the First English Civil War

Coordinates: 52.115°N 1.314°W

- Part of the First English Civil War
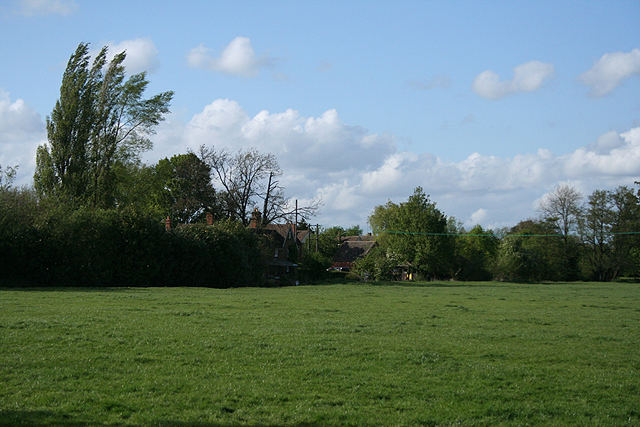
Date	29 June 1644
Location	Cropredy, near Banbury, Oxfordshire
Result	Royalist victory

Belligerents
Royalists	Parliamentarians

Commanders and leaders
Charles I	Sir William Waller

Strength
5,000 horse 4,000 foot (only part engaged)	5,000 horse 4,000 foot (only part engaged)

Casualties and losses
Unknown	700; 11 guns captured

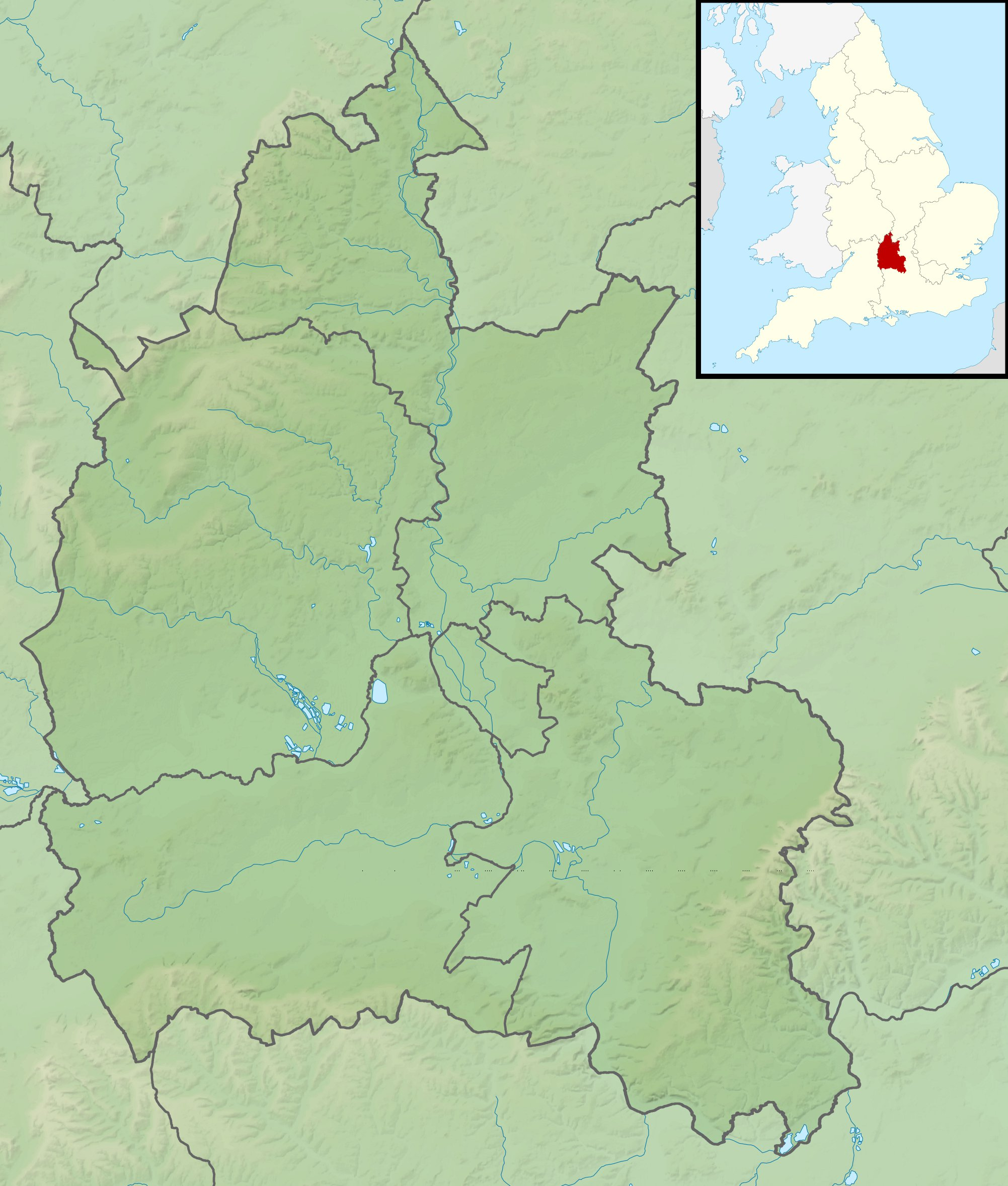
Oxfordshire and Cropredy Bridge

The Battle of Cropredy Bridge was fought on Saturday 29 June 1644 (9 July 1644 Gregorian) near Banbury, Oxfordshire during the First English Civil War. In the engagement, Sir William Waller and the Parliamentarian army failed to capture King Charles.

The site was placed on the Register of Historic Battlefields maintained by Historic England in 1995.

== Background ==
In the early part of 1644, the Royalists suffered several setbacks. Two field armies were defeated at Nantwich and Cheriton, and a Scottish Covenanter army invaded the north of England, driving the Royalists to York, where they were besieged.

King Charles held a council of war in Oxford, his wartime capital, between 25 April and 5 May. It was agreed that while the King remained on the defensive in Oxford, protected by several outlying fortified towns, his nephew Prince Rupert of the Rhine (the famous Royalist field commander) would proceed to retrieve the situation in the north. The military command of the forces that remained with King Charles fell to Lord General Patrick Ruthven, 1st Earl of Forth.

== Campaign ==
After Rupert departed, the King's council changed this policy. To find reinforcements for the West Country where Rupert's brother Prince Maurice was besieging Lyme Regis, they ordered the fortress of Reading, in Berkshire, to be abandoned. This released 2,500 foot soldiers for service elsewhere, but it also allowed the Parliamentarian armies of the Earl of Essex and Sir William Waller to concentrate against Oxford. On 19 May, they began advancing toward Oxford from Reading. On 25 May, the Royalists abandoned Abingdon in the face of Essex's advance. Essex occupied the town and then crossed the Thames to capture bridges over the River Cherwell north of Oxford, while Waller passed south of Oxford to capture a crossing over the Thames to the west at Newbridge.

Charles was in imminent danger of being surrounded and besieged in Oxford. As the city was short of provisions, he would soon be forced to surrender. On 3 June, Charles made a feint towards Abingdon to induce Waller to draw back, and then marched westward at night towards Worcester with a force mainly composed of cavalry. With Essex and Waller in pursuit, he was still in danger, but on 7 June, the two Parliamentarian generals (who disliked each other) conferred at Stow on the Wold, and agreed that Essex would march westward to relieve the siege of Lyme Regis, while Waller shadowed the King.

This allowed the King to make another feint, which convinced Waller he was about to march northward, and then move back south by carrying his foot soldiers down the Avon in commandeered boats, so as to return to Oxford and collect reinforcements. Waller, having failed to intercept the King, went to Gloucester for provisions. On 24 June, he marched from Gloucester to Stow on the Wold, where he received intelligence that the King was marching eastward from Oxford into the Parliamentarian-held eastern counties, and soon received orders from the Parliamentarian Committee of Both Kingdoms to pursue him. By 27 June, Waller had reached Hanwell Castle on high ground to the west of the Cherwell, the King being just 5 miles (8.0 km) away in Edgecote. On 28 June, the King moved to Banbury. He was resolved to offer battle, but Waller held the advantageous position.

== Battle ==
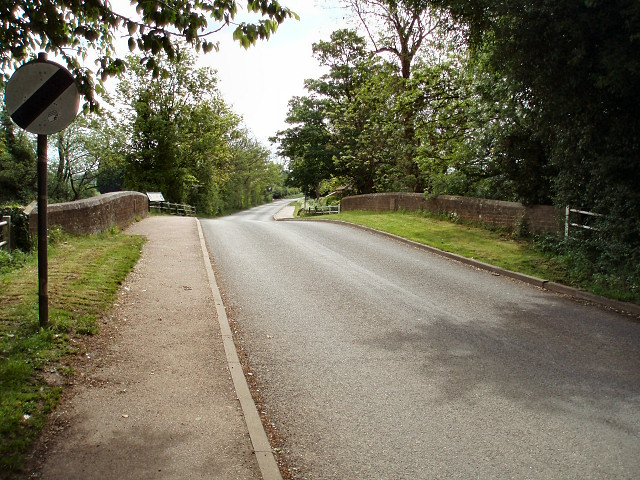
Cropredy Bridge, looking east towards Williamscot. On the fence beyond the left-hand parapet may be seen a plaque commemorating the battle.

On Saturday, 29 June, Charles's army began marching north along the east side of the River Cherwell. Waller's forces proceeded to shadow the King's movements on the other side of the river, the two armies little more than a mile apart and in sight of each other, but neither prepared to cross under the fire of enemy guns.

As they approached Cropredy, Charles ordered a small detachment of dragoons to seize the bridge over the Cherwell. At this point, he received a warning that 300 additional horsemen were approaching from the north to join Waller's army, and he ordered his army to hasten its march to cut off this detachment. The Royalist army became strung out. The vanguard and main body had crossed a stream at Hay's Bridge (near the present-day village of Chipping Warden), leaving a rearguard of only two cavalry brigades under the Earl of Cleveland and the twenty-year-old Earl of Northampton, with some infantry, south of Hay's Bridge.

Waller, seeing his opportunity, sent Lieutenant General John Middleton across Cropredy Bridge with two regiments of horse (those of Sir Arthur Haselrig and Colonel Jonas Vandruske) and nine companies of foot to isolate the Royalist rearguard, while he himself led 1,000 men across Slat Mill Ford, a mile to the south of the bridge, to catch the Royalist rear in a pincer movement.

The Royalist dragoons holding Cropredy Bridge were soon overpowered. As Middleton's force streamed towards Hay's Bridge, they became strung out and vulnerable. At Hay's Bridge, Middleton's cavalry was checked by Royalist musketeers who had overturned a carriage to block the bridge, while the Earl of Cleveland charged the Parliamentarian foot and artillery behind them. Meanwhile, Northampton's brigade charged downhill against Waller's men, and forced them back across the Slat Mill Ford.

The King was alerted that his rearguard was engaged, and ordered his army to turn about. He also sent his own lifeguard of horse under Lord Bernard Stewart back across Hay's Bridge to aid Cleveland. With their help, Cleveland made a second charge which forced Middleton back across Cropredy Bridge, abandoning eleven guns. Waller's major general of ordnance, Sir James Wemyss, was also captured.

The bridge itself was held by two Parliamentarian regiments of foot, Colonel Ralph Weldon's Kentish Regiment and the Tower Hamlets Trained Bands regiment. The Royalists tried to recapture the bridge but were repulsed. Waller's remaining artillery continued to fire from their vantage point on Bourton Hill, forcing the Cavaliers to fall back from the river.

== Aftermath ==
By evening, the two armies still faced each other across the River Cherwell. Charles took opportunity in the lull to dispatch his secretary of war, Sir Edward Walker, to parley with Waller with a message of grace and pardon, but the Parliamentarian replied that he had no power to treat.

At length, after receiving further intelligence of additional Parliamentarians nearby, and as the king's train was low in food and supplies, the Royalists slipped away under the cover of night, taking the guns captured from Waller with them. While the Royalists had suffered few casualties, Waller had lost 700 men, many having deserted immediately after the battle.

Waller's army shortly became demoralised, and immobilised by desertions and mutinies by men unwilling to serve far from their homes, chiefly those drawn from London. Charles could afford to ignore Waller and march into the West Country after Essex, forcing Essex's army to surrender at Lostwithiel.

== Music ==
The song Red and Gold by (written by Ralph McTell for Fairport Convention, whose annual music festival is held on the outskirts of Cropredy) relates the story of the battle as told by a non-combatant. Versions of the song by various artists exist.
