= Little Bourton =

Village in Oxfordshire

Coordinates: 52.094°N 1.333°W

- Location within Oxfordshire
- OS grid reference: SP4576 4417
- Civil parish: Bourton
- District: Cherwell
- Shire county: Oxfordshire
- Region: South East
- Country: England
- Sovereign state: United Kingdom
- Post town: Banbury
- Postcode district: OX17
- Dialling code: 01295
- Police: Thames Valley
- Fire: Oxfordshire
- Ambulance: South Central
- UK Parliament: Banbury

Little Bourton, also known as Bourton Parva is a village in the civil parish of Bourton, in the Cherwell district, in the county of Oxfordshire, England. It is located about three miles north of Banbury.
