= Cherwell (district) =

Cherwell Cherwell District
- Non-metropolitan district
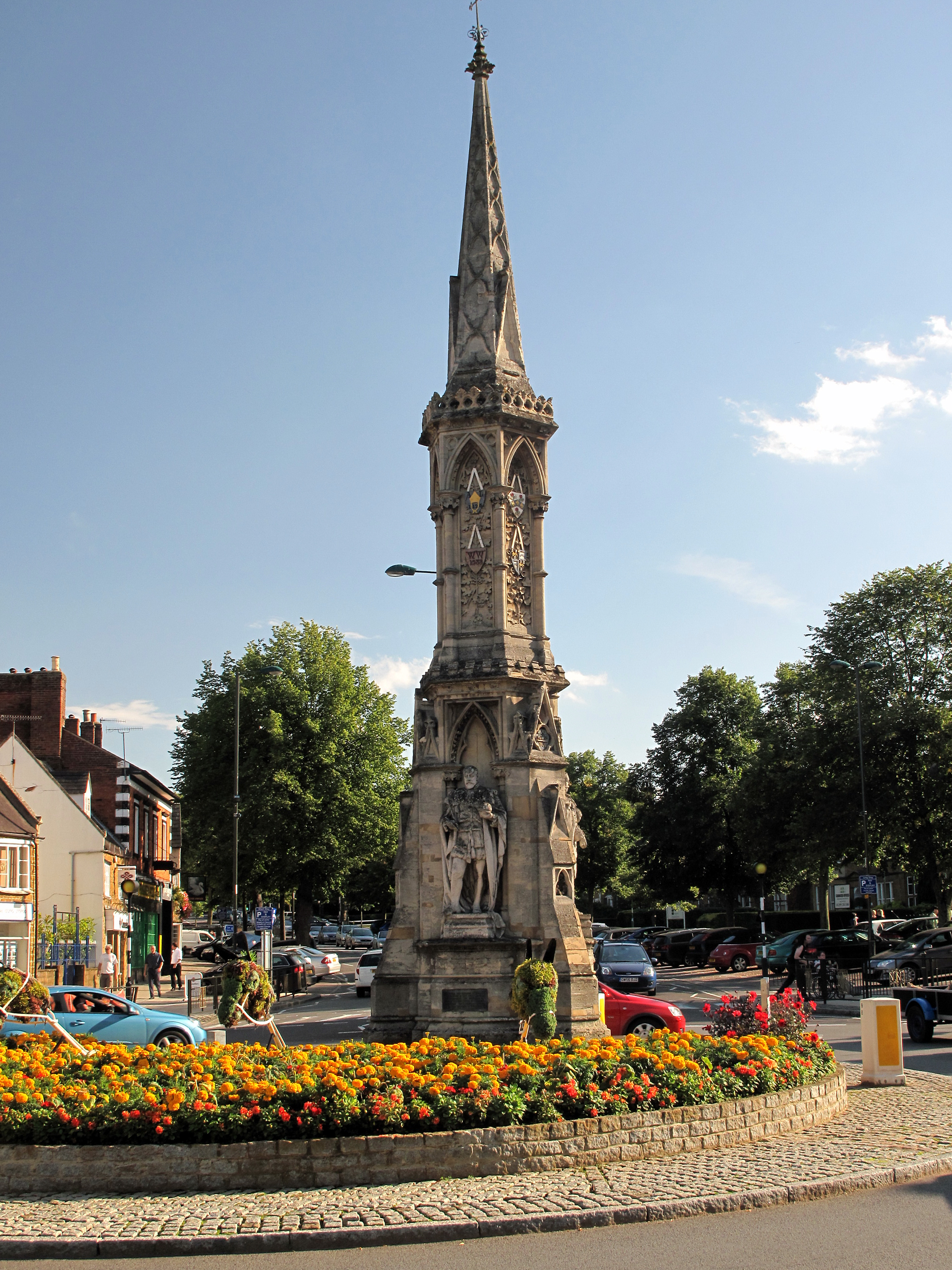
- The cross in Banbury, the district's administrative centre

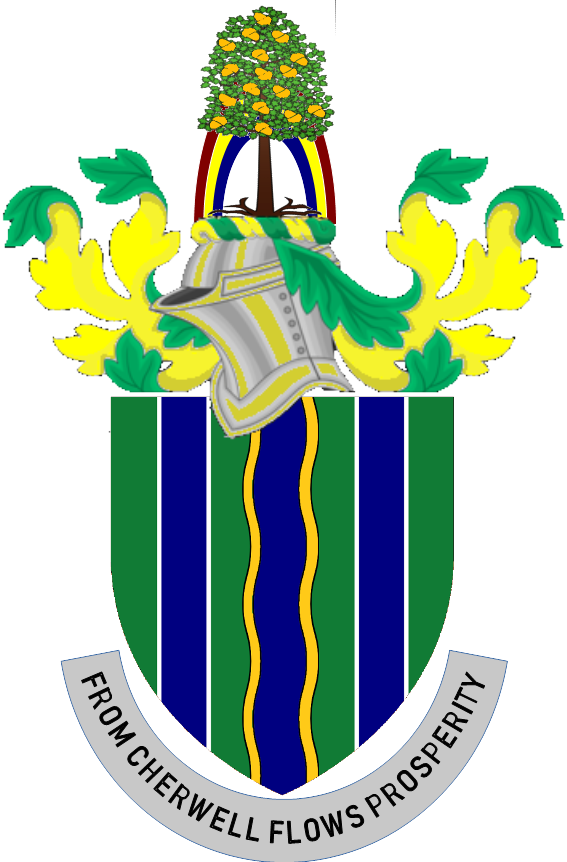
- Coat of arms

- Cherwell shown within Oxfordshire
- Coordinates: 51.95°N 1.25°W
- Sovereign state: United Kingdom
- Constituent country: England
- Region: South East England
- Non-metropolitan county: Oxfordshire
- Status: Non-metropolitan district
- Admin HQ: Bodicote
- Incorporated: 1 April 1974

Government
  - Type: Non-metropolitan district council
  - Body: Cherwell District Council
  - Leadership: Leader & Cabinet (No overall control)
  - MPs: Sean Woodcock; Calum Miller

Area
  - Total: 227.3 sq mi (588.8 km^{2})
  - Rank: 62nd (of 296)

Population (2025)
  - Total: 172,178
  - Rank: 124th (of 296)
  - Density: 757.4/sq mi (292.4/km^{2})

Ethnicity (2021)
  - Ethnic groups: List: 88.1% White; 6% Asian; 2.9% Mixed; 1.8% Black; 1.3% other

Religion (2021)
  - Religion: List: 50.3% Christianity; 38.1% no religion; 6.1% not stated; 3.2% Islam; 0.8% Hinduism; 0.6% Buddhism; 0.5% other; 0.4% Sikhism; 0.1% Judaism
- Time zone: UTC0 (GMT)
  - Summer (DST): UTC+1 (BST)
- ONS code: 38UB (ONS); E07000177 (GSS)
- OS grid reference: SP5153928258

Cherwell (/ˈtʃɑːrwɛl/ CHAR-wel or /ˈtʃɜːrwɛl/ CHUR-wel) is a local government district in northern Oxfordshire, England. The district was created in 1974 and takes its name from the River Cherwell, which drains south through the region to flow into the River Thames at Oxford. Towns in Cherwell include Banbury, where the council is based, Bicester and Kidlington.

== History ==
Cherwell district was created on 1 April 1974 under the Local Government Act 1972, covering the area of four former districts, which were all abolished at the same time:

- Banbury Municipal Borough
- Banbury Rural District
- Bicester Urban District
- Ploughley Rural District

The new district was named Cherwell after the main river in the area.

== Abolition ==
Under current local government reorganisation plans, all district councils in Oxfordshire, as well as the county council, will be abolished in 2028, with the district being split between new Greater Oxford and North Oxfordshire unitary authorities.

== Geography ==
The northern half of the Cherwell district consists mainly of gently rolling hills going down towards the River Cherwell, but the southern half of the district around Bicester is much flatter. The north-west of the district lies at the northern extremity of the Cotswolds.

== Governance ==
Cherwell District Council

Type
- Type: Non-metropolitan district council

Leadership
- Chair: Nigel Simpson, Conservative since 20 May 2026
- Leader: Lesley McLean, Liberal Democrat since 20 May 2026
- Chief Executive: Gordon Stewart since 2024

Structure
- Seats: 48 councillors
- Political groups: Administration (25) Liberal Democrats (21) Green Party (4) Other parties (23) Labour (8) Conservative (8) Reform UK (6) Independent (1)

Elections
- Last election: 7 May 2026
- Next election: TBD

Meeting place
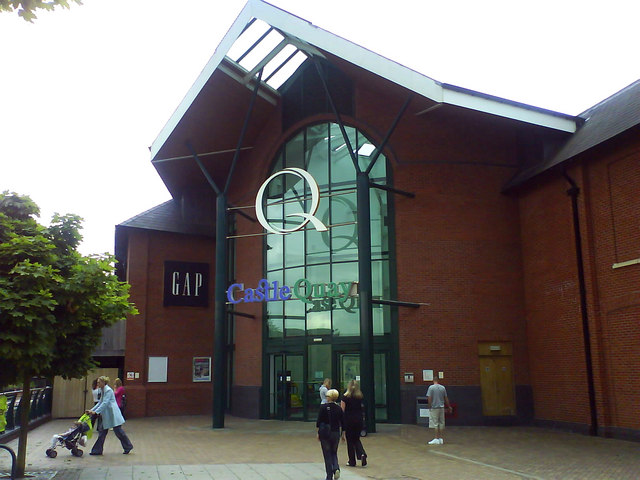
- 39 Castle Quay, Banbury, OX16 5FD

Website
- www.cherwell.gov.uk

Oxfordshire has a two-tier structure of local government, with the five district councils (including Cherwell District Council) providing district-level services, and Oxfordshire County Council providing county-level services.

=== Political control ===
The council has been under no overall control since the 2023 election. Prior to that election, the Conservatives had held a majority of the seats on the council since 2000. Following the 2024 election a coalition of the Liberal Democrats, the Green Party, and one independent councillor would took charge of the council as a minority administration. Following the 2026 election a similar coalition of the Liberal Democrats and Greens formed to run the council, holding a majority of the council's seats between them.

The first election to the district council was held in 1973, initially operating as a shadow authority alongside the outgoing authorities until it came into its powers on 1 April 1974. Political control of the council since 1974 has been as follows:

Party in control	Years
No overall control	1974–1976
Conservative	1976–1995
No overall control	1995–1996
Labour	1996–1998
No overall control	1998–2000
Conservative	2000–2023
No overall control	2023–present

=== Leadership ===
The leaders of the council since 2001 have been:

Councillor	Party	From	To
George Reynolds	Conservative	3 Sep 2001	Jun 2004
Barry Wood (Note: Following the Conservatives losing control of the council in the 2023 elections Barry Wood was removed from office at the council's annual meeting on 17 May 2023. Since the council could not agree on a replacement leader the meeting was then adjourned until 23 May 2023, but no alternative leader who could command a majority had emerged by then either so Barry Wood was reinstated as leader.)	Conservative	23 Jun 2004	17 May 2023
Barry Wood	Conservative	23 May 2023	22 May 2024
David Hingley	Liberal Democrats	22 May 2024	12 May 2026
Lesley McLean	Liberal Democrats	20 May 2026	

=== Composition ===
Following the 2026 election,the composition of the council is:

Party	Councillors
Liberal Democrats	21
Labour	8
Conservative	8
Reform	6
Green	4
Independent	1
Total	48

The next election is theoretically due in 2027 but the exact nature and timing of the election will be determined by proposed reforms to local government which could involve the creation of a single unitary authority covering the whole of Oxfordshire and under current proposals would involve the abolition of district councils.

=== Premises ===
The council is based at 39 Castle Quay in Banbury, the district's largest town. The council's premises comprise some converted former shop units within a shopping centre. The council moved into Castle Quay in 2025.

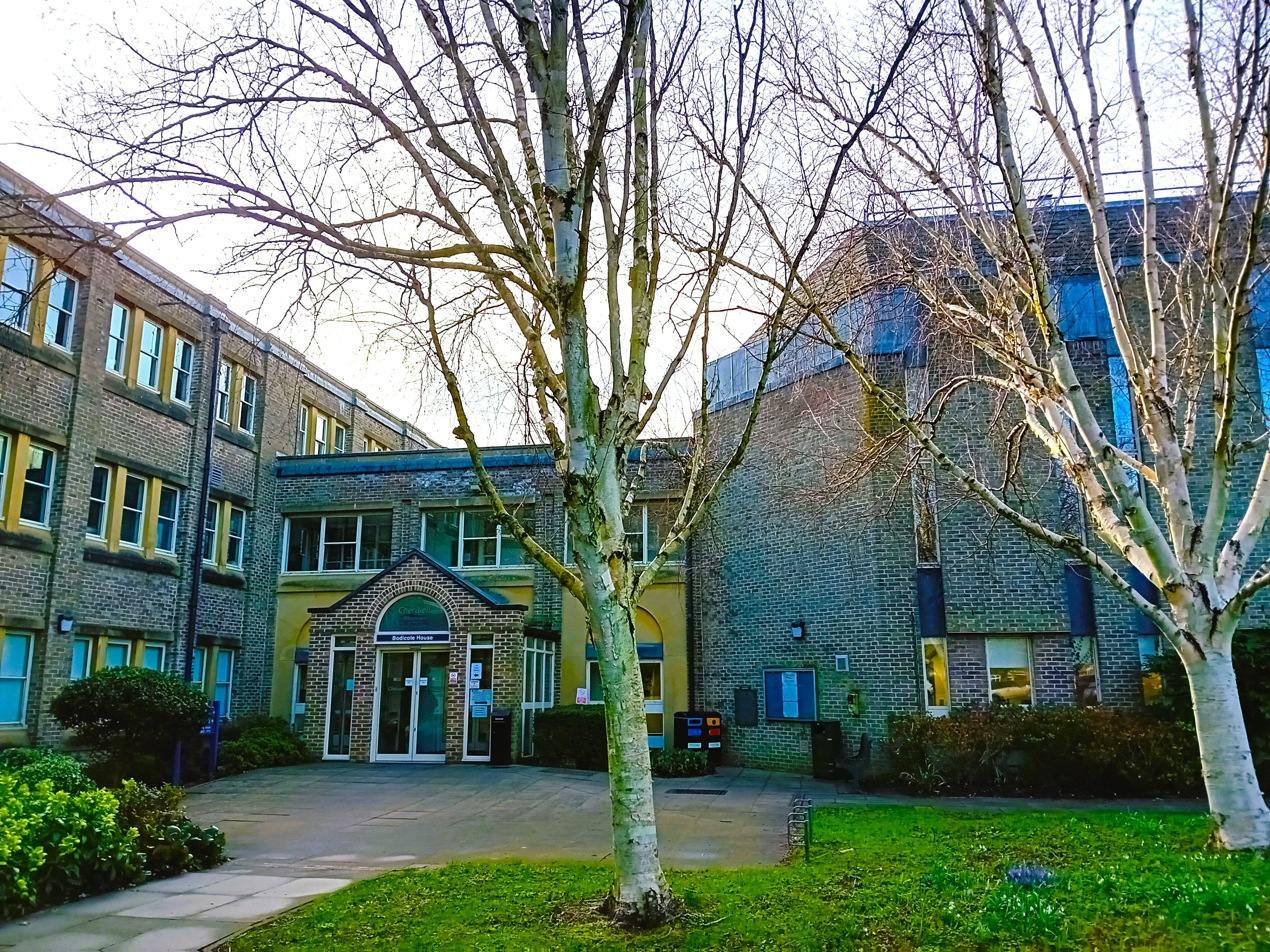
Bodicote House, White Post Road, Bodicote: Council's headquarters 1974–2025

Prior to 2025, the council was based at Bodicote House in Bodicote, a village immediately to the south of Banbury. Bodicote House is a large eighteenth century house, which had served as the headquarters of the old Banbury Rural District Council from 1952. Large modern extensions were added to the original house. In 2023 the council announced plans to move its headquarters into the Castle Quay shopping centre in Banbury and sell the Bodicote House site. The move, to 39 Castle Quay, took place on 31 March 2025.

== Elections ==
Since 2016 the council has comprised 48 councillors elected from 16 wards, with each ward electing three councillors. Elections to the council are held in three out of every four years, with one third of the council being chosen at each election. Elections to Oxfordshire County Council are held in the fourth year of the cycle when there are no district council elections.

== Arms ==
Coat of arms of Cherwell

Notes
Granted 21 March 2016
Crest
On a Wreath Or and Vert in front of a Rainbow proper an Oak Tree eradicated Sable leaved Vert and fructed Or, Mantled Vert and Azure lined Or and Argent.
Escutcheon
Vert a Pale wavy Or thereon a Pale wavy Azure all between two Pallets Argent on each a Pallet Azure.
Motto
From Cherwell Flows Prosperity

== Transport ==
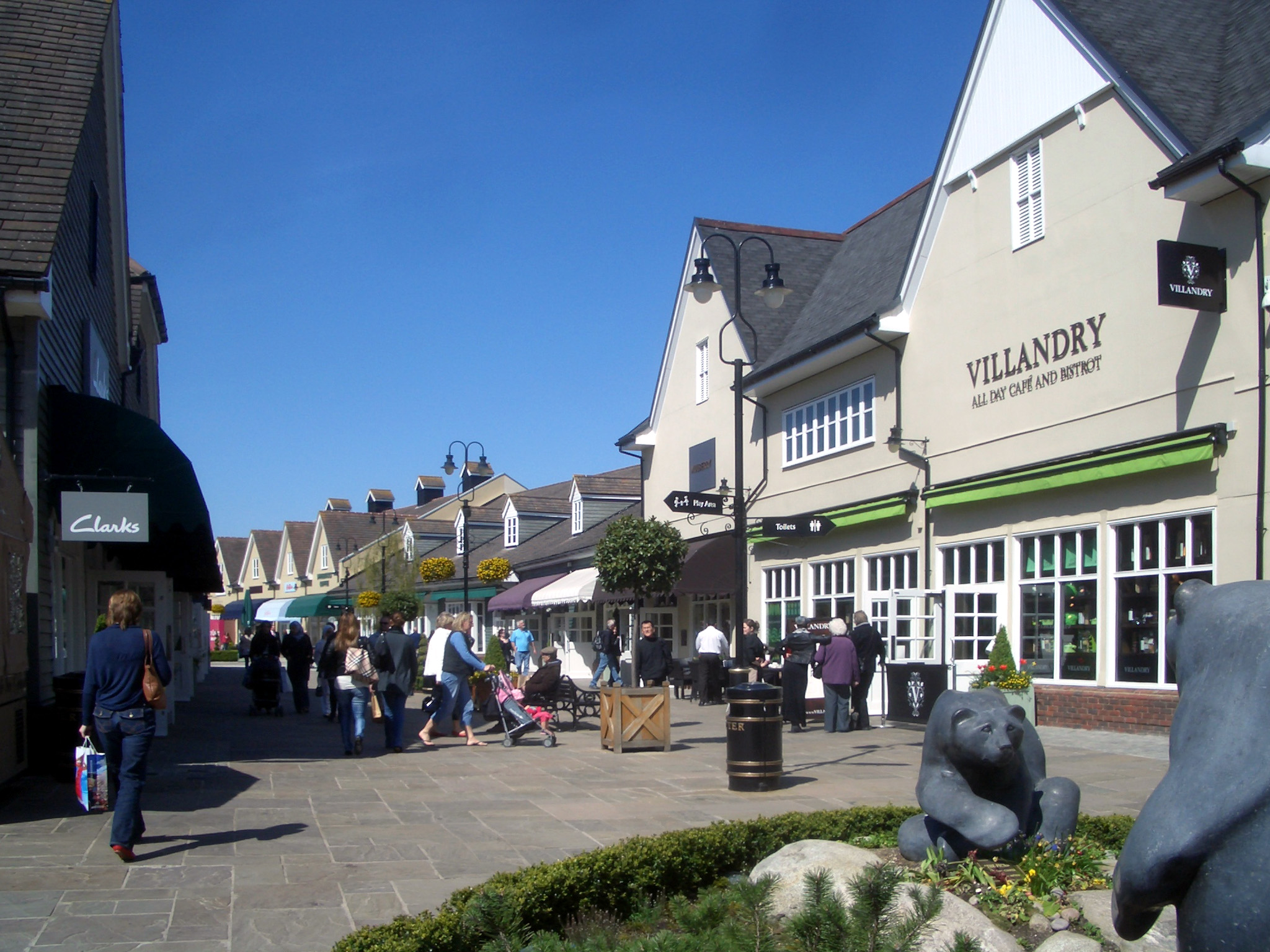
Bicester, the second-largest settlement in the district

Much of the district is within easy reach of the M40, with junctions 9, 10 and 11 in the district. It also has good rail links with London, Birmingham, Oxford and the South.

== Media ==
In terms of television, the area is served by BBC South and ITV Meridian broadcasting from the Oxford transmitter. However, Banbury can also receive BBC West Midlands and ITV Central from the local relay transmitter which is transmitted via the Sutton Coldfield transmitter.

Radio stations for the area are Banbury FM, BBC Radio Oxford, Heart South, Capital Mid-Counties and Greatest Hits Radio.

Local newspapers are Banbury Guardian and Bicester Advertiser.

== Settlements in Cherwell district ==
Cherwell population pyramid

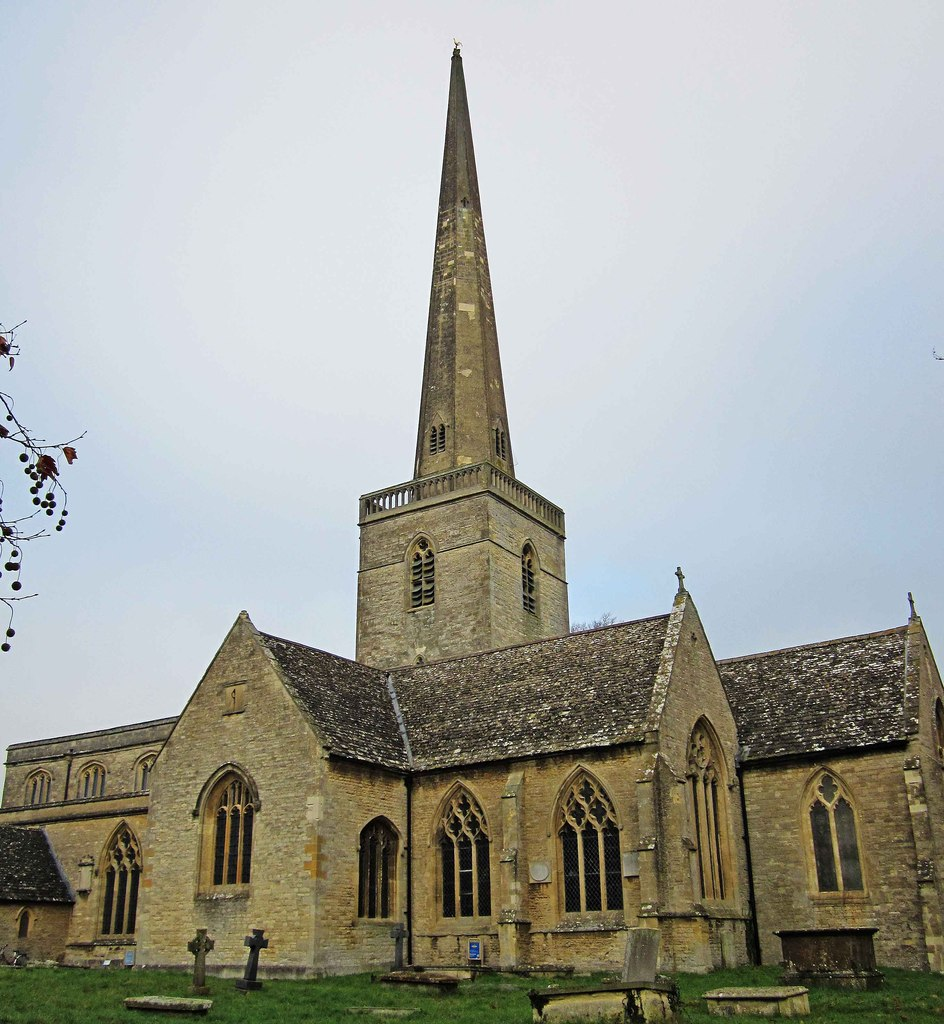
Kidlington, the third-largest settlement in the district and one of the largest villages in England

- Adderbury, Ambrosden, Ardley, Arncott
- Banbury, Barford St. John, Barford St. Michael, Begbroke, Bicester
- Blackthorn
- Bletchingdon, Bloxham, Bodicote
- Broughton
- Bucknell, Burdrop
- Charlton-on-Otmoor, Claydon, Cottisford, Cropredy
- Deddington, Drayton, Duns Tew
- Epwell
- Fencott, Finmere, Fringford, Fritwell
- Godington, Gosford, Great Bourton
- Hampton Poyle, Hanwell, Hardwick, Hethe
- Hook Norton, Horley
- Islip
- Juniper Hill
- Kidlington, Kirtlington
- Launton, Little Bourton, Lower Heyford
- Merton, Middle Aston, Middleton Stoney
- Milcombe, Milton, Mixbury, Mollington, Murcott
- Noke, North Aston, North Newington
- Oddington
- Prescote
- Shenington, Shipton-on-Cherwell, Shutford
- Sibford Ferris, Sibford Gower, Somerton
- Souldern, South Newington, Steeple Aston, Stoke Lyne, Swalcliffe
- Tadmarton, Thrupp
- Upper Heyford
- Wardington, Water Eaton, Weston-on-the-Green, Wroxton
- Yarnton

== See also ==
- History of Banbury, Oxfordshire
