= Mary Lobel =

British historian (1900–1993)

Mary Doreen Lobel OBE FSA
- Born: Mary Doreen Rogers; 25 June 1900; Bristol
- Died: 1 December 1993 (aged 93); Banbury
- Education: St Hugh's College, Oxford
- Occupations: Historian, editor
- Known for: English local history
- Spouse: Edgar Lobel

Mary Doreen Lobel (née Rogers) (25 June 1900 – 1 December 1993) was a historian who edited several volumes of the Victoria County History and a three-volume British Atlas of Historic Towns.

== Biography ==
Lobel was born Mary Doreen Rogers in Bristol on 25 June 1900. Her father, Frederick William Rogers was a stone merchant and her mother was Blanche Mary née Lyons. The family were strong suffragists, and would entertain suffragist gatherings. She was educated at Clifton High School and helped Walter Ewing Crum with cataloging translations for his Coptic dictionary.

Through Crum, she met Edgar Lobel, a research student 12 years her senior, and the couple were effectively engaged by 1918. In 1919, Lobel attended St Hugh's College, Oxford, reading history and taught history at Norwich High School after she graduated in 1922. The couple married on 24 August 1927 and moved to Oxford.

Lobel worked for the Victoria County History, as a contributor to A History of the County of Oxford, from the 1930s; and as the VCH's Oxfordshire county editor from the 1950s until 1972. Thereafter she concentrated on editing the three-volume British Atlas of Historic Towns. While editing the Victoria County History, Lobel was also a librarian at Somerville College, Oxford.

Lobel was made an OBE in 1990.

== Final years and death ==
Edgar died in 1982 and Lobel lived alone, suffering from Alzheimer's disease. She moved to Wardington House nursing home, Banbury, where she died on 1 December 1993. She left her estate to St Hugh's College, Somerville College, and the Historic Towns Trust.

== Works ==
=== Victoria County History ===
- Contributor: Salzman, Louis F.; Page, W.H.; Salter, Herbert E.; Lobel, Mary D; Crossley, Alan (1939). A History of the County of Oxford. Victoria County History. Vol. 1. Archibald Constable and Co.
- Editor, with Herbert E. Salter: A History of the County of Oxford. Victoria County History. Vol. 3. 1954.
- Editor: A History of the County of Oxford. Victoria County History. Vol. 5: Bullingdon Hundred. 1957.
- Editor: A History of the County of Oxford. Victoria County History. Vol. 6: Ploughley Hundred. 1959.
- Editor: A History of the County of Oxford. Victoria County History. Vol. 7: Thame and Dorchester Hundreds. 1962.
- Editor: A History of the County of Oxford. Victoria County History. Vol. 8: Lewknor and Pyrton Hundreds. 1964.
- Editor, with Alan Crossley: A History of the County of Oxford. Victoria County History. Vol. 9: Bloxham Hundred. 1969.
- Contributor: Crossley, Alan; Colvin, Christina; Cooper, Janet; Cooper, N.H.; Harvey, P.D.A.; Hollings, Marjory; Hook, Judith; Jessup, Mary; Lobel, Mary D.; Mason, J.F.A.; Trinder, B.S.; Turner, Hilary (1972). Crossley, Alan (ed.). A History of the County of Oxford. Victoria County History. Vol. 10: Banbury Hundred.

=== Atlas of Historic Towns ===
- Editor: The Atlas of Historic Towns: Maps and Plans of Towns and Cities in British Isles, with Historical Commentaries, from Earliest Times to 1800. Towns: Bristol, Cambridge, Coventry, Norwich. Vol. II. Baltimore, MD: Johns Hopkins University Press. 1975. ISBN 0-8018-1753-6.
- Editor: British Atlas of Historic Towns: The City of London from Prehistoric Times to Circa 1520. Vol. III. Oxford: Oxford University Press. 1969. ISBN 0-19-822979-8.
