= Grade II* listed buildings in Cherwell (district) =

There are over 20,000 Grade II* listed buildings in England. This page is a list of these buildings in the district of Cherwell in Oxfordshire.

== List of buildings ==
Name	Location	Type	Completed (Note: The date given is the date used by Historic England as significant for the initial building or that of an important part in the structure's description.)	Date designated	Grid ref. (Note: The grid reference is based on the British national grid reference system, sometimes known as OSGB36, used by the Ordnance Survey.) Geo-coordinates	Entry number (Note: The "List Entry Number" is a unique number assigned to each listed building and scheduled monument by Historic England.)	Image
The Grange	Adderbury East	Manor house	1381	8 December 1955	SP4710635416; 52°00′55″N 1°18′54″W	1200006	Upload Photo
Cross Hill House	Adderbury West	House	Mid-18th century	8 December 1955	SP4663235522; 52°00′58″N 1°19′19″W	1046411	Upload Photo
Friends Meeting House	Adderbury West	Friends Meeting House	1675	8 December 1955	SP4651835302; 52°00′51″N 1°19′25″W	1046356	Friends Meeting House More images
Numbers 1, 1a, 2, 3 and 4 Le Hall Place plus attached forecourt walls and gatepiers	Adderbury West	Manor house	14th century	8 December 1955	SP4656235496; 52°00′57″N 1°19′23″W	1046359	Upload Photo
Church of St Mary the Virgin	Ambrosden	Church	Late 12th century	7 December 1966	SP6030019409; 51°52′12″N 1°07′32″W	1046525	Church of St Mary the Virgin More images
Church of St Mary	Ardley	Church	14th century or earlier	7 December 1966	SP5424227371; 51°56′32″N 1°12′44″W	1046881	Church of St Mary More images
Ann Elizabeth Health Foods/The Reindeer Inn	Banbury	Public house	Early/mid-16th century	9 April 1952	SP4549740643; 52°03′44″N 1°20′16″W	1369571	Ann Elizabeth Health Foods/The Reindeer Inn More images
Banbury Cross	Banbury	Town cross	1858	7 October 1969	SP4532440399; 52°03′36″N 1°20′25″W	1199654	Banbury Cross More images
Browns/Clays Butchers/Lunn Poly	Banbury	House	1650	9 April 1952	SP4566240598; 52°03′43″N 1°20′07″W	1046969	Browns/Clays Butchers/Lunn Poly More images
Calthorpe House/Danvers House/Dashwood House	Banbury	House	16th century or earlier	9 April 1952	SP4541740255; 52°03′32″N 1°20′20″W	1046966	Upload Photo
Carpenters	Banbury	House	19th century	9 April 1952	SP4560640598; 52°03′43″N 1°20′10″W	1200100	Carpenters More images
FB Hancock solicitors	Banbury	House	17th century	9 April 1952	SP4536840510	1283202	FB Hancock solicitors More images
Hardwick House	Banbury	Farmhouse	16th century	9 April 1952	SP4589942956; 52°04′59″N 1°19′54″W	1200559	Hardwick House More images
Jervis and Partners	Banbury	House	c.1830–40	9 April 1952	SP4533940105; 52°03′27″N 1°20′25″W	1046914	Upload Photo
Johnson and Gaunt Solicitors	Banbury	House	17th century	7 October 1969	SP4540840672; 52°03′45″N 1°20′21″W	1200151	Johnson and Gaunt Solicitors
Nationwide and entrance to Unicorn Hotel	Banbury	Hotel	Mid-17th century	9 April 1952	SP4561140624; 52°03′44″N 1°20′10″W	1369548	Nationwide and entrance to Unicorn Hotel More images
Oxfordshire County Council Social Services	Banbury	House	Early 18th century	9 April 1952	SP4528440192; 52°03′30″N 1°20′27″W	1046912	Upload Photo
Unicorn Hotel	Banbury	Inn	Mid-17th century	9 April 1952	SP4558940623; 52°03′44″N 1°20′11″W	1200118	Unicorn Hotel
Church of St John	Barford St. John, Barford St. John and St. Michael	Church	12th century	8 December 1955	SP4389333201; 51°59′44″N 1°21′44″W	1046238	Church of St John More images
Manor House	Barford St. Michael, Barford St. John and St. Michael	Farmhouse	Probably 16th/17th century	8 December 1955	SP4319932740; 51°59′29″N 1°22′20″W	1046247	Upload Photo
Church of St Michael	Begbroke	Church	Late 12th century	7 December 1966	SP4684613942; 51°49′20″N 1°19′18″W	1291232	Church of St Michael More images
The Old Priory and attached garden walls	Bicester	House	15th century	31 January 1952	SP5842322118; 51°53′40″N 1°09′09″W	1046470	Upload Photo
The Old Vicarage	Bicester	House	c.1500	3 January 1952	SP5825522309; 51°53′47″N 1°09′17″W	1199889	Upload Photo
Bletchingdon Park	Bletchingdon	Country house	1782	26 November 1951	SP5053318026; 51°51′31″N 1°16′04″W	1219924	Bletchingdon Park More images
Church of St Giles	Bletchingdon	Church	Mid-13th century	7 December 1966	SP5065318058; 51°51′32″N 1°15′57″W	1220032	Church of St Giles More images
Home Farmhouse	Bletchingdon	Farmhouse	17th century	26 November 1951	SP5030417512; 51°51′14″N 1°16′16″W	1220080	Upload Photo
Rectory Farmhouse	Bloxham	Farmhouse	Mid-15th century	8 December 1955	SP4295035657; 52°01′04″N 1°22′32″W	1046194	Upload Photo
Church of St John the Baptist	Bodicote	Church	13th century	8 December 1955	SP4599337683; 52°02′08″N 1°19′51″W	1277948	Church of St John the Baptist More images
Church of St Lawrence	Caversfield	Church	10th/11th century	7 December 1966	SP5806325202; 51°55′20″N 1°09′26″W	1046533	Church of St Lawrence More images
Churchyard cross approximately 5 metres south west of Church of St Mary the Virgin	Charlton-on-Otmoor	Cross	14th/15th century	10 April 1987	SP5618015808; 51°50′17″N 1°11′10″W	1045779	Churchyard cross approximately 5 metres south west of Church of St Mary the Virgin More images
Church of St Mary	Great Chesterton, Chesterton	Church	12th century	7 December 1966	SP5618821366; 51°53′17″N 1°11′06″W	1300898	Church of St Mary More images
Manor Farm House	Great Chesterton, Chesterton	Farmhouse	12th century and later	9 December 1987	SP5631621367; 51°53′17″N 1°10′59″W	1369747	Upload Photo
Church of St James the Great	Claydon, Claydon with Clattercot	Church	12th century	8 December 1955	SP4570350047; 52°08′49″N 1°20′01″W	1287785	Church of St James the Great More images
Priory Farmhouse	Clattercote, Claydon with Clattercot	Farmhouse	Late 13th/early 14th century	8 December 1955	SP4579849200; 52°08′21″N 1°19′56″W	1215881	Upload Photo
Church of St Mary	Cottisford	Church	13th century	7 December 1966	SP5872931063; 51°58′30″N 1°08′47″W	1046439	Church of St Mary More images
Castle End Monks Court	Deddington	Farmhouse	16th century or earlier	8 December 1955	SP4700931700; 51°58′54″N 1°19′01″W	1046345	Upload Photo
Castle House	Deddington	Manor house	13th century	8 December 1955	SP4675231746; 51°58′56″N 1°19′14″W	1300851	Castle House More images
Church of St Peter and St Paul	Deddington	Church	Early 13th century	8 December 1955	SP4675031699; 51°58′54″N 1°19′15″W	1365859	Church of St Peter and St Paul More images
Maunds Farmhouse	Deddington	Farmhouse	Early 17th century	19 June 1987	SP4655131627; 51°58′52″N 1°19′25″W	1046314	Maunds Farmhouse
Plough House The Steps	Deddington	House	Mid-17th century	8 December 1955	SP4675031306; 51°58′42″N 1°19′15″W	1046329	Plough House The Steps
The Hermitage	Deddington	House	Mid-17th century	8 December 1955	SP4666731717; 51°58′55″N 1°19′19″W	1046323	The Hermitage More images
Church of St Peter	Drayton	Church	14th century	8 December 1955	SP4283741564; 52°04′15″N 1°22′35″W	1369591	Church of St Peter More images
Drayton Arch approximately 300 metres to south of Park Farmhouse	Drayton	Folly	c.1750	23 February 1982	SP4285941082; 52°03′59″N 1°22′34″W	1369593	Drayton Arch approximately 300 metres to south of Park Farmhouse More images
Church of St Anne	Epwell	Church	13th century	8 December 1955	SP3529240473; 52°03′41″N 1°29′12″W	1369555	Church of St Anne More images
Church of St Olave	Fritwell	Church	12th century	7 December 1966	SP5245229301; 51°57′35″N 1°14′17″W	1046892	Church of St Olave More images
Fritwell Manor	Fritwell	House	1619	26 November 1951	SP5240329479; 51°57′41″N 1°14′20″W	1266393	Upload Photo
Manor House	Water Eaton, Gosford and Water Eaton	Hall house	c.1586	26 November 1951	SP5156012067; 51°48′18″N 1°15′13″W	1046562	Manor House More images
St Frideswides Farmhouse	Cutteslowe, Gosford and Water Eaton	Farmhouse	16th century	26 November 1951	SP5072711266; 51°47′52″N 1°15′57″W	1286525	Upload Photo
Church of St Giles	Hampton Gay	Church	1767–72	7 December 1966	SP4845816450; 51°50′40″N 1°17′53″W	1291122	Church of St Giles More images
Church of St Mary	Hampton Poyle	Church	Late 13th century	7 December 1966	SP4983715522; 51°50′10″N 1°16′41″W	1220144	Church of St Mary More images
Hanwell Castle	Hanwell	House	c.1498	8 December 1955	SP4363143605; 52°05′21″N 1°21′53″W	1287674	Hanwell Castle More images
Granary/dovecote at SP 5652 3068	Tusmore, Hardwick with Tusmore	Dovecote	16th century	7 December 1966	SP5647830687; 51°58′18″N 1°10′45″W	1046450	Granary/dovecote at SP 5652 3068
Hardwick Manor House	Hardwick, Hardwick with Tusmore	Farmhouse	c.1580 to 1643	26 November 1951	SP5765729602; 51°57′43″N 1°09′44″W	1046449	Hardwick Manor House
Swerford Park	Swerford Park, Hook Norton	House	18th century	8 December 1955	SP3640931310; 51°58′45″N 1°28′17″W	1369836	Upload Photo
Manor House	Horley	Clergy house	16th/17th century	8 December 1955	SP4168243857; 52°05′29″N 1°23′35″W	1216542	Manor House More images
Proffitt's House	Hornton	House	Mid-17th century	8 December 1955	SP3932645072; 52°06′09″N 1°25′38″W	1216568	Proffitt's House
Studley Almshouses	Horton-cum-Studley	Almshouse	1639	26 November 1951	SP5977712367; 51°48′24″N 1°08′04″W	1193018	Studley Almshouses More images
Studley Priory	Studley, Horton-cum-Studley	Priory/Hotel	15th/early 16th century	26 November 1951	SP5975312219; 51°48′20″N 1°08′05″W	1193052	Studley Priory More images
The Old Weir	Studley, Horton-cum-Studley	House	c.1350	10 April 1987	SP6022612555; 51°48′30″N 1°07′40″W	1046568	Upload Photo
The Old Rectory	Islip	House	19th/20th century	26 November 1951	SP5273113996; 51°49′20″N 1°14′11″W	1046539	The Old Rectory
Dovecote approximately 10 metres north north east of the Old Rectory and Dovecote End	Kidlington	Dovecote	16th century	26 November 1951	SP4972214455; 51°49′35″N 1°16′48″W	1290949	Upload Photo
The Vicarage	Kidlington	Vicarage	Mid-16th century	26 November 1951	SP4969114341; 51°49′32″N 1°16′49″W	1290954	Upload Photo
Church of St Mary	Kirtlington	Church	Early 12th century, possibly earlier	7 December 1966	SP5002119493; 51°52′18″N 1°16′30″W	1300872	Church of St Mary More images
Barn approximately 50 metres south of Manor Farmhouse	Launton	Barn	14th/15th century	9 December 1987	SP6036622816; 51°54′02″N 1°07′27″W	1232879	Upload Photo
Church of St Mary	Lower Heyford	Church	13th century	7 December 1966	SP4851124872; 51°55′13″N 1°17′46″W	1225457	Church of St Mary More images
Heyford Bridge: that part in the parish of Lower Heyford	Lower Heyford	Bridge	1255	26 November 1951	SP4785924764; 51°55′10″N 1°18′20″W	1266350	Heyford Bridge: that part in the parish of Lower Heyford More images
Church of All Saints	Middleton Stoney	Church	Mid-12th century	7 December 1966	SP5310823252; 51°54′19″N 1°13′46″W	1276839	Church of All Saints More images
Middleton Park: garage wing and northern pair of forecourt lodges	Middleton Stoney	House	1938	26 November 1951	SP5254923281; 51°54′20″N 1°14′15″W	1232950	Upload Photo
Middleton Park: service wing and southern pair of forecourt lodges	Middleton Stoney	House	1938	26 November 1951	SP5252723242; 51°54′19″N 1°14′16″W	1232953	Upload Photo
Church of All Saints	Mixbury	Church	12th century	7 December 1966	SP6092833994; 52°00′04″N 1°06′50″W	1192977	Church of All Saints More images
Church of All Saints	Mollington	Church	Late 13th century or early 14th century	8 December 1955	SP4422647499; 52°07′27″N 1°21′20″W	1228026	Church of All Saints More images
Church of St Giles	Noke	Church	13th century	7 December 1966	SP5444613173; 51°48′52″N 1°12′42″W	1369713	Church of St Giles More images
Church of St Mary	North Aston	Church	14th century	8 December 1955	SP4805028894; 51°57′23″N 1°18′08″W	1200620	Church of St Mary More images
Church of St Andrew	Oddington	Church	13th century	7 December 1966	SP5526014801; 51°49′45″N 1°11′58″W	1369717	Church of St Andrew More images
Church of St Nicholas	Piddington	Church	Late 13th century	7 December 1966	SP6399916980; 51°50′52″N 1°04′20″W		Church of St Nicholas More images
Church of Holy Trinity	Shenington	Church	12th century	8 December 1955	SP3727942786; 52°04′56″N 1°27′27″W	1183960	Church of Holy Trinity More images
The Beeches	Alkerton, Shenington with Alkerton	House	1716	28 January 1981	SP3768142836; 52°04′57″N 1°27′06″W	1046834	Upload Photo
The Old Rectory and attached wall	Alkerton, Shenington with Alkerton	House	1625	20 September 1988	SP3774542892; 52°04′59″N 1°27′02″W	1046833	Upload Photo
Village Cross	Thrupp, Shipton-on-Cherwell and Thrupp	Village cross	c.1500	7 December 1966	SP4804715773; 51°50′19″N 1°18′15″W	1210769	Upload Photo
Church of St Martin	Shutford	Church	Late 12th/13th century	8 December 1955	SP3860940183; 52°03′31″N 1°26′18″W	1184161	Church of St Martin More images
Manor House and abutting kitchen block	Shutford	Manor house	17th century	8 December 1955	SP3864640167; 52°03′31″N 1°26′16″W	1300239	Manor House and abutting kitchen block
Barn at Manor Farm at SP52183155	Souldern	Threshing barn	c.1400	3 October 1988	SP5206031622; 51°58′50″N 1°14′36″W	1046430	Upload Photo
Church of St Mary	Souldern	Church	Mid-12th century	7 December 1966	SP5230131691; 51°58′52″N 1°14′24″W	1046428	Church of St Mary More images
College Farmhouse	South Newington	Farmhouse	1659	8 December 1955	SP4077333307; 51°59′48″N 1°24′27″W	1249042	College Farmhouse
Church of St Peter and St Paul	Steeple Aston	Church	13th century	8 December 1955	SP4760026070; 51°55′52″N 1°18′33″W	1357162	Church of St Peter and St Paul More images
Cuttle Mill	Steeple Aston	House	Late 17th/early 18th century	8 December 1955	SP4801125114; 51°55′21″N 1°18′12″W	1066593	Upload Photo
Eyecatcher at SP48282603	Steeple Aston	Folly	c.1740	8 December 1955	SP4828026030; 51°55′51″N 1°17′57″W	1357142	Eyecatcher at SP48282603 More images
Church of St Peter	Stoke Lyne	Church	12th century	7 December 1966	SP5665228337; 51°57′02″N 1°10′38″W	1193248	Church of St Peter More images
Barn at Manor House	Tadmarton	Grange barn	15th century	8 December 1955	SP3926337902; 52°02′17″N 1°25′44″W	1283551	Upload Photo
Church of St Mary	Upper Heyford	Church	14th century	7 December 1966	SP4948325866; 51°55′45″N 1°16′54″W	1226006	Church of St Mary More images
Wardington Manor	Upper Wardington, Wardington	Manor house	15th or 16th century	8 December 1955	SP4934146062; 52°06′38″N 1°16′51″W	1228757	Wardington Manor More images
Williamscot House, late sixteenth-century range	Williamscot, Wardington	Country house	c.1568	8 December 1955	SP4779345698; 52°06′27″N 1°18′13″W	1287374	Upload Photo
Church of St Mary	Weston-on-the-Green	Church	Pre-Conquest, early C13	7 December 1966	SP5311018580; 51°51′48″N 1°13′49″W	1233027	Church of St Mary More images
Weston Manor Hotel	Weston-on-the-Green	Hall house	Late medieval, rebuilt 1820	7 December 1966	SP5337418450; 51°51′44″N 1°13′35″W	1276762	Weston Manor Hotel More images
Church of All Saints	Wroxton	Church	14th century	8 December 1955	SP4173041760; 52°04′22″N 1°23′33″W	1300046	Church of All Saints More images
Church of St Mary Magdalene	Balscote, Wroxton	Church	14th century	8 December 1955	SP3899741733; 52°04′21″N 1°25′57″W	1299831	Church of St Mary Magdalene More images
Dovecote approximately 200 metres south west of Wroxton College	Wroxton	Dovecote	1745	20 September 1988	SP4148341515; 52°04′14″N 1°23′46″W	1046772	Dovecote approximately 200 metres south west of Wroxton College
Gateway, gates, wall and attached lodge to Wroxton College	Wroxton	Gate	1771	20 September 1988	SP4143441738; 52°04′21″N 1°23′49″W	1369625	Upload Photo
Icehouse approximately 150 metres north east of Wroxton College	Wroxton	Icehouse	Early 18th century	20 September 1988	SP4184141695; 52°04′19″N 1°23′27″W	1369626	Upload Photo
Obelisk approximately 400 metres south east of Wroxton College	Wroxton	Obelisk	c.1750	23 February 1988	SP4196141272; 52°04′06″N 1°23′21″W	1046770	Obelisk approximately 400 metres south east of Wroxton College More images
Priory Farmhouse	Balscote, Wroxton	Farmhouse	14th century	8 December 1955	SP3923541665; 52°04′19″N 1°25′44″W	1299886	Upload Photo
Base and shaft of churchyard cross approximately 16 metres south south east of south porch of Church of St Bartholomew	Yarnton	Cross	14th century	26 February 1988	SP4777011664; 51°48′06″N 1°18′31″W	1290168	Base and shaft of churchyard cross approximately 16 metres south south east of south porch of Church of St Bartholomew More images
Yarnton Manor and attached wall and gateway	Yarnton	Farmhouse	Post Civil War–1895	26 November 1951	SP4769311627; 51°48′05″N 1°18′35″W	1290170	Yarnton Manor and attached wall and gateway More images

== See also ==
- Grade I listed buildings in Cherwell (district)
- Grade II* listed buildings in Oxford
- Grade II* listed buildings in South Oxfordshire
- Grade II* listed buildings in Vale of White Horse
- Grade II* listed buildings in West Oxfordshire
