= Grade II* listed buildings in Vale of White Horse =

There are over 20,000 Grade II* listed buildings in England. This page is a list of these buildings in the district of Vale of White Horse in Oxfordshire.

== List of buildings ==
Name	Location	Type	Completed (Note: The date given is the date used by Historic England as significant for the initial building or that of an important part in the structure's description.)	Date designated	Grid ref. (Note: The grid reference is based on the British national grid reference system, sometimes known as OSGB36, used by the Ordnance Survey.) Geo-coordinates	Entry number (Note: The "List Entry Number" is a unique number assigned to each listed building and scheduled monument by Historic England.)	Image
Stratton House	Abingdon	House	1722	10 December 1971	SU4961597209; 51°40′17″N 1°17′02″W	1048924	Upload Photo
Stratton Lodge	Abingdon	House	c.1800	19 January 1951	SU4960897219; 51°40′18″N 1°17′03″W	1183402	Upload Photo
The Clock House	Abingdon	House	1722	19 January 1951	SU4950097031; 51°40′12″N 1°17′08″W	1368304	The Clock House More images
The Knowl	Abingdon	House	16th century	19 January 1951	SU4975697268; 51°40′19″N 1°16′55″W	1283160	The Knowl More images
Tomkins Almshouses	Abingdon	Almshouses	Founded 1733	19 January 1951	SU4928397016; 51°40′11″N 1°17′20″W	1368299	Tomkins Almshouses More images
Twickenham House (20 East St Helen Street)	Abingdon	House	Mid-18th century	19 January 1951	SU4976096954; 51°40′09″N 1°16′55″W	1368281	Twickenham House (20 East St Helen Street) More images
Railings to No 20, East St Helen Street	Abingdon	Railings and lamp holder		10 December 1971	SU4975496954; 51°40′09″N 1°16′55″W	1048904	Railings to No 20, East St Helen Street
Stables to No 20 including cobbled yard	Abingdon	Stables	Mid-18th century	10 December 1971	SU4977396969; 51°40′09″N 1°16′54″W	1199451	Upload Photo
Wall and gatepiers to Stables at No 20	Abingdon	Wall and gate		10 December 1971	SU4975696970; 51°40′10″N 1°16′55″W	1368282	Upload Photo
26 and 26a East St Helen St	Abingdon	House	C. late 16th or early 17th century	19 January 1951	SU4975396929; 51°40′08″N 1°16′55″W	1048906	26 and 26a East St Helen St More images
28 East St Helen St	Abingdon	House	Early 18th century	19 January 1951	SU4975296917; 51°40′08″N 1°16′55″W	1283371	28 East St Helen St More images
57 East St Helen Street	Abingdon	House	1732	19 January 1951	SU4971496871; 51°40′06″N 1°16′57″W	1199427	57 East St Helen Street
Appleton Manor	Appleton	House	c.1190–1200	6 August 1952	SP4435601510; 51°42′38″N 1°21′34″W	1198061	Appleton Manor More images
Church of St Lawrence	Appleton	Church	Late 12th century	9 February 1966	SP4439401545; 51°42′39″N 1°21′32″W	1048421	Church of St Lawrence More images
Ardington House	Ardington	Country house	c.1720	25 October 1951	SU4329588273; 51°35′30″N 1°22′35″W	1048188	Ardington House More images
Church of the Holy Trinity	Ardington	Church	12th century	24 November 1966	SU4315688319; 51°35′31″N 1°22′42″W	1048189	Church of the Holy Trinity More images
The Manor House	Ashbury	Manor house	c.1488	21 November 1966	SU2631685228; 51°33′55″N 1°37′18″W	1368375	The Manor House More images
Church of St Lawrence	Besselsleigh	Church	Early 12th century	9 February 1966	SP4563101073; 51°42′24″N 1°20′28″W	1048397	Church of St Lawrence More images
Buckland House	Buckland	Country house	c.1757	21 November 1966	SU3405298212; 51°40′54″N 1°30′32″W	1368380	Buckland House More images
Home Farm Dovecote	Buckland	Dovecote	1755–57	15 January 1986	SU3406396708; 51°40′05″N 1°30′32″W	1048686	Home Farm Dovecote More images
Ice house about 270m north east of Buckland House	Buckland	Icehouse	c.1757	15 January 1986	SU3425098399; 51°41′00″N 1°30′22″W	1284798	Upload Photo
Manor House	Buckland	Country house	c.1580	10 November 1952	SU3426298258; 51°40′55″N 1°30′21″W	1284800	Manor House More images
Buscot Park	Buscot	Country house	c.1780	10 November 1952	SU2430696829; 51°40′11″N 1°39′00″W	1368116	Buscot Park More images
Manor Farmhouse	Buscot	Farmhouse	1691	10 November 1952	SU2304197720; 51°40′40″N 1°40′05″W	1181672	Manor Farmhouse More images
The Old Parsonage	Buscot	Vicarage	1703	10 November 1952	SU2259698147; 51°40′54″N 1°40′28″W	1052711	The Old Parsonage More images
Place Farm House	Chilton	Farmhouse	15th century	7 May 1976	SU4908885822; 51°34′09″N 1°17′35″W	1199600	Upload Photo
Church of All Saints	Coleshill	Church	Late 12th century	21 November 1966	SU2354693776; 51°38′32″N 1°39′40″W	1368120	Church of All Saints More images
Coleshill Park, northern pair of piers on the drive about 40m south east of gate lodge	Coleshill	Gatepiers	17th century	10 November 1952	SU2398393837; 51°38′34″N 1°39′17″W	1284579	Upload Photo
Coleshill Park, northern pair of piers about 15m south east of clock house	Coleshill	Gatepiers	17th century	10 November 1952	SU2394893769; 51°38′32″N 1°39′19″W	1052694	Upload Photo
Coleshill Park, southern pair of piers on the drive, about 40m south east of gate lodge	Coleshill	Gatepiers	17th century	10 November 1952	SU2398093834; 51°38′34″N 1°39′17″W	1052693	Upload Photo
Coleshill Park, southern pair of piers about 15m south east of clock house	Coleshill	Gatepiers	17th century	10 November 1952	SU2394293765; 51°38′32″N 1°39′19″W	1284553	Upload Photo
Courtleaze Farm buildings and attached gatepiers and rickyard walls	Coleshill	Farm buildings	c.1850–54	23 November 1990	SU2353193562; 51°38′25″N 1°39′41″W	1052663	Courtleaze Farm buildings and attached gatepiers and rickyard walls
The Old Rectory	Coleshill	House	14th–19th century	10 November 1952	SU2365593805; 51°38′33″N 1°39′34″W	1052689	Upload Photo
Church of St Swithun	Compton Beauchamp	Church	Late 13th century	21 November 1966	SU2792386919; 51°34′50″N 1°35′54″W	1198176	Church of St Swithun More images
Compton Beauchamp House: gates, gatepiers and walls about 35m north	Compton Beauchamp	Gatepiers	c.1710	10 November 1952	SU2799286982; 51°34′52″N 1°35′51″W	1283938	Compton Beauchamp House: gates, gatepiers and walls about 35m north
Compton Beauchamp House: gates, gatepiers and walls about 200m south	Compton Beauchamp	Gate	c.1710	11 December 1985	SU2792986759; 51°34′44″N 1°35′54″W	1198250	Upload Photo
Bear and Ragged Staff Inn	Cumnor	Farmhouse	Early 17th century	6 August 1952	SP4591004094; 51°44′01″N 1°20′12″W	1368591	Bear and Ragged Staff Inn More images
Swinford Bridge (that part in Cumnor)	Cumnor	Bridge	1767	9 February 1966	SP4430708608; 51°46′28″N 1°21′33″W	1284764	Swinford Bridge (that part in Cumnor) More images
Church of St James	Denchworth	Church	Late 12th century	24 November 1966	SU3810891714; 51°37′23″N 1°27′03″W	1048582	Church of St James More images
Denchworth Manor	Denchworth	House	Late 16th/early 17th century	25 October 1951	SU3824891754; 51°37′24″N 1°26′56″W	1048583	Upload Photo
Church of Saint Peter	Drayton	Church	c.1200	9 February 1966	SU4804994140; 51°38′38″N 1°18′25″W	1052771	Church of Saint Peter More images
The Manor House	Drayton	Manor house	Mid-15th century	6 August 1952	SU4823094063; 51°38′36″N 1°18′16″W	1052737	The Manor House More images
Church of St Nicholas	East Challow	Church	Mid-/late 13th century	24 November 1966	SU3807888253; 51°35′31″N 1°27′06″W	1048593	Church of St Nicholas More images
Church of St Augustine of Canterbury	East Hendred	Church	12th century	24 November 1966	SU4593188614; 51°35′40″N 1°20′18″W	1048169	Church of St Augustine of Canterbury More images
Hendred House and St Amands Chapel	East Hendred	Cross-wing house	Early 15th century	25 October 1951	SU4609288635; 51°35′41″N 1°20′10″W	1368665	Hendred House and St Amands Chapel
Church of St Michael	Eaton Hastings	Church	13th century	21 November 1966	SU2628198558; 51°41′07″N 1°37′16″W	1182735	Church of St Michael More images
Church of St Nicholas	Fyfield	Church	c.1200	9 February 1966	SU4234198904; 51°41′14″N 1°23′20″W	1368546	Church of St Nicholas More images
Manor Farmhouse	Fyfield	Farmhouse	c.1700	9 February 1966	SU4227198842; 51°41′12″N 1°23′24″W	1048366	Manor Farmhouse More images
The Manor House	Fyfield	Manor house	c.1325	6 August 1952	SU4230798943; 51°41′16″N 1°23′22″W	1198429	The Manor House More images
The White Hart Inn	Fyfield	Open-hall house	Mid-15th century, after 1442	6 August 1952	SU4235698760; 51°41′10″N 1°23′19″W	1048407	The White Hart Inn More images
Church of All Saints	Goosey	Church	Early/mid-13th century	24 November 1966	SU3563891654; 51°37′21″N 1°29′12″W	1368468	Church of All Saints More images
Church of St Giles	Great Coxwell	Church	13th century	21 November 1966	SU2698993424; 51°38′20″N 1°36′41″W	1368112	Church of St Giles More images
Old Town Hall	Great Faringdon	Town hall	Late 17th or early 18th century	12 February 1958	SU2888195578; 51°39′30″N 1°35′02″W	1048440	Old Town Hall More images
Sudbury House	Great Faringdon	House	18th century	10 November 1952	SU2933595626; 51°39′31″N 1°34′38″W	1368525	Upload Photo
Cherry Barn and attached outbuildings, about 5m east of Bayllols Manor	Harwell	Hall house	c.1350	25 October 1951	SU4919289339; 51°36′03″N 1°17′28″W	1368642	Upload Photo
Cruck barn about 40m east of Bayllols Manor	Harwell	Cruck barn	c.1365	24 November 1966	SU4923689372; 51°36′04″N 1°17′26″W	1048206	Upload Photo
Gable Cottage and Tibbleton Cottage	Harwell	House	Late 17th century	5 May 1988	SU4916888872; 51°35′48″N 1°17′30″W	1048218	Upload Photo
Geering's Almshouses and attached walls and gate	Harwell	Gate	c.1723	25 October 1951	SU4916389167; 51°35′57″N 1°17′30″W	1368639	Geering's Almshouses and attached walls and gate More images
Lime Tree House	Harwell	House	17th century	24 November 1966	SU4911489121; 51°35′56″N 1°17′32″W	1199929	Upload Photo
The Manor House	Hatford	House	Late 17th century	10 November 1952	SU3368994804; 51°39′04″N 1°30′52″W	1048640	Upload Photo
The Old Church of St George	Hatford	Church	Mid-12th century	21 November 1966	SU3371994817; 51°39′04″N 1°30′50″W	1284666	The Old Church of St George More images
Church of St Margaret	Hinton Waldrist	Church	Mid-13th century	21 November 1966	SU3751399104; 51°41′22″N 1°27′31″W	1048641	Church of St Margaret More images
Hinton Manor	Hinton Waldrist	House	Late 16th century	10 November 1952	SU3744499163; 51°41′24″N 1°27′35″W	1182212	Upload Photo
The Old Rectory and Old Rectory Cottage	Hinton Waldrist	House	14th–19th century	15 January 1986	SU3757699145; 51°41′23″N 1°27′28″W	1368397	Upload Photo
Kennington Manor House and attached wall and gatepiers	Kennington	Farmhouse	Late 18th century	6 August 1952	SP5233702356; 51°43′03″N 1°14′38″W	1182054	Upload Photo
Gazebo, terrace walls, gates, gatepiers and wall 74m north west of Kingston House	Kingston Bagpuize with Southmoor	Gazebo	Early 18th century	6 August 1952	SU4079997986; 51°40′45″N 1°24′41″W	1048380	Gazebo, terrace walls, gates, gatepiers and wall 74m north west of Kingston House
Kingston House	Kingston Bagpuize with Southmoor	Country house	17th century	6 August 1952	SU4072897913; 51°40′43″N 1°24′44″W	1198912	Kingston House More images
New Bridge and flanking walls (that part in Kingston Bagpuize civil parish)	Kingston Bagpuize with Southmoor	Bridge	14th century and later	9 February 1966	SP4036401387; 51°42′35″N 1°25′02″W	1048348	New Bridge and flanking walls (that part in Kingston Bagpuize civil parish) More images
Church of St John the Baptist	Kingston Lisle	Church	c.1200	21 November 1966	SU3261887622; 51°35′11″N 1°31′50″W	1048718	Church of St John the Baptist More images
Kingston Lisle Park	Kingston Lisle	Country house	1677	10 November 1952	SU3264587500; 51°35′07″N 1°31′49″W	1048722	Upload Photo
Church of St Michael	Letcombe Bassett	Church	12th century	24 November 1966	SU3737884919; 51°33′43″N 1°27′44″W	1253889	Church of St Michael More images
The Old Rectory, barn about 15m south east	Letcombe Bassett	Barn	14th century	11 December 1985	SU3748284967; 51°33′44″N 1°27′38″W	1048731	Upload Photo
Church of St Andrew	Letcombe Regis	Church	12th century	24 November 1966	SU3802586474; 51°34′33″N 1°27′10″W	1368706	Church of St Andrew More images
Church of St Mary	Little Coxwell	Church	Transitional	21 November 1966	SU2819093534; 51°38′24″N 1°35′39″W	1048820	Church of St Mary More images
Church of All Saints	East Lockinge	Church	12th century	24 November 1966	SU4282087204; 51°34′55″N 1°23′00″W	1368679	Church of All Saints More images
Church of St Mary	Longcot	Church	13th century	21 November 1966	SU2739690718; 51°36′53″N 1°36′21″W	1048781	Church of St Mary More images
Longcot House	Longcot	House	c.1703	21 November 1966	SU2766090939; 51°37′00″N 1°36′07″W	1048786	Longcot House More images
Tithe Barn	Longworth	Tithe barn	17th century	19 July 1999	SU3870698196; 51°40′52″N 1°26′30″W	1387458	Upload Photo
Church of St Mary	Lyford	Church	Early 13th century	9 February 1966	SU3901194230; 51°38′44″N 1°26′15″W	1199327	Church of St Mary More images
Lyford Grange	Lyford	House	c.1430–80	9 February 1966	SU3961794531; 51°38′53″N 1°25′44″W	1283468	Upload Photo
Church of All Saints	Marcham	Church	Early 13th century	9 February 1966	SU4520496814; 51°40′06″N 1°20′52″W	1048354	Church of All Saints More images
Hyde Farmhouse	Marcham	Farmhouse	Circa mid-16th century	12 February 1987	SU4596796838; 51°40′06″N 1°20′12″W	1368562	Upload Photo
The Priory about 10m south of Marcham Priory (not included)	Marcham	House	Mid-16th century	6 August 1952	SU4567196434; 51°39′53″N 1°20′28″W	1199599	The Priory about 10m south of Marcham Priory (not included)
Church of St Blaise	Milton	Church	14th century	9 February 1966	SU4853692417; 51°37′43″N 1°18′01″W	1368648	Church of St Blaise More images
42a and 42b High Street	Milton	Jettied house	Early 14th century	5 May 1988	SU4856692362; 51°37′41″N 1°17′59″W	1300905	42a and 42b High Street More images
Church of St Lawrence	North Hinksey	Church	Early 12th century	9 February 1966	SP4948305479; 51°44′45″N 1°17′05″W	1182110	Church of St Lawrence More images
Churchyard cross approximately 15 metres south of Church of St Lawrence	North Hinksey	Cross	15th century	9 February 1966	SP4950505470; 51°44′45″N 1°17′04″W	1048318	Churchyard cross approximately 15 metres south of Church of St Lawrence More images
Well house, approximately 160 metres south-east of The Fold	North Hinksey	Well house	1610	9 February 1966	SP4952405048; 51°44′31″N 1°17′03″W	1048315	Well house, approximately 160 metres south-east of The Fold More images
Church of All Saints	Pusey	Church	1745–50	21 November 1966	SU3604996526; 51°39′59″N 1°28′49″W	1368423	Church of All Saints More images
Pusey House	Pusey	Country house	c.1750	10 November 1952	SU3592296762; 51°40′07″N 1°28′55″W	1048628	Pusey House More images
Chapel	St Peters College, Radley	Chapel	1893–94	24 June 1987	SU5183799505; 51°41′31″N 1°15′05″W	1368608	Chapel More images
Church of St James	Radley	Church	13th century	9 February 1966	SU5219499377; 51°41′27″N 1°14′47″W	1048324	Church of St James More images
Radley Hall	St Peters College, Radley	Country House	1721–27	9 February 1966	SU5178299546; 51°41′32″N 1°15′08″W	1182496	Radley Hall More images
Wick Hall and attached walls	Radley	House	c.1720	9 February 1966	SU5166097974; 51°40′41″N 1°15′15″W	1284611	Upload Photo
Holywell House	Shellingford	House	Mid-17th century	15 January 1986	SU3174893706; 51°38′29″N 1°32′33″W	1182685	Upload Photo
Elm Tree House	Shrivenham	House	c.1700	10 November 1952	SU2404688970; 51°35′57″N 1°39′15″W	1183075	Elm Tree House More images
Church of St Laurence	South Hinksey	Church	Early/mid-13th century	9 February 1966	SP5097303969; 51°43′56″N 1°15′48″W	1048297	Church of St Laurence More images
Barn about 20m north east of the Manor Preparatory School	Shippon, St. Helen Without	Barn	15th century	9 February 1966	SU4846698045; 51°40′45″N 1°18′02″W	1048303	Upload Photo
Cox's Hall	Stanford in the Vale	House	1739	10 November 1952	SU3405693116; 51°38′09″N 1°30′34″W	1048611	Cox's Hall More images
Wall about 15m south of Cox's Hall	Stanford in the Vale	Gatepier	c.1739	15 January 1986	SU3406293085; 51°38′08″N 1°30′33″W	1048577	Wall about 15m south of Cox's Hall
Orchard House	Stanford in the Vale	House	1635	10 November 1952	SU3435393438; 51°38′19″N 1°30′18″W	1368473	Orchard House More images
The Manor House and Manor Cottage	Stanford in the Vale	Farmhouse	16th/early 18th century	10 November 1952	SU3421893403; 51°38′18″N 1°30′25″W	1368451	Upload Photo
Home Farmhouse	Steventon	Farmhouse	14th century	9 February 1966	SU4729392027; 51°37′30″N 1°19′06″W	1052749	Upload Photo
Priory Cottage	Steventon	House	c.1463	6 August 1952	SU4655891503; 51°37′14″N 1°19′44″W	1052724	Priory Cottage More images
Raised Causeway	Steventon	Causeway	14th century	19 February 1988	SU4665191649; 51°37′18″N 1°19′39″W	1052720	Raised Causeway More images
Raised Causeway	Steventon	Causeway	14th century	19 February 1988	SU4688691845; 51°37′25″N 1°19′27″W	1368076	Raised Causeway More images
Raised Causeway	Steventon	Causeway	14th century	19 February 1988	SU4728892062; 51°37′31″N 1°19′06″W	1368074	Raised Causeway More images
Tudor House	Steventon	House	Mid-17th century	6 August 1952	SU4675791739; 51°37′21″N 1°19′34″W	1052721	Tudor House More images
39 The Causeway	Steventon	House	15th century	6 August 1952	SU4698691864; 51°37′25″N 1°19′22″W	1052753	39 The Causeway
83 and 85 The Causeway	Steventon	House	15th century	6 August 1952	SU4669191673; 51°37′19″N 1°19′37″W	1052723	83 and 85 The Causeway
Church of St Leonard	Sunningwell	Church	13th century	9 February 1966	SP4957200532; 51°42′05″N 1°17′03″W	1182736	Church of St Leonard More images
The Old Manor	Sunningwell	House	Early 17th century	6 August 1952	SP4974700660; 51°42′09″N 1°16′54″W	1368593	The Old Manor
Buckeridges	Sutton Courtenay	Timber-framed house	1631	6 August 1952	SU5018793850; 51°38′28″N 1°16′34″W	1052701	Upload Photo
Chest tomb about 10m south of chancel of Church of All Saints	Sutton Courtenay	Chest Tomb	15th century	19 February 1988	SU5048894175; 51°38′39″N 1°16′18″W	1368103	Chest tomb about 10m south of chancel of Church of All Saints More images
East gatepier about 20m south east of the Manor House	Sutton Courtenay	Gatepier	c.1670	6 August 1952	SU5024694134; 51°38′38″N 1°16′31″W	1052733	Upload Photo
Outbuilding about 15m north east of the Manor House	Sutton Courtenay	Banqueting house	16th century	6 August 1952	SU5025594160; 51°38′38″N 1°16′30″W	1182341	Upload Photo
The Manor House	Sutton Courtenay	Cruck house	12th century	6 August 1952	SU5023094140; 51°38′38″N 1°16′32″W	1052732	The Manor House More images
West gatepier approximately 20 metres south east of the Manor House	Sutton Courtenay	Gatepier	c.1670	6 August 1952	SU5024194129; 51°38′37″N 1°16′31″W	1052734	Upload Photo
Church of St Mary	Upton	Church	12th century	24 November 1966	SU5148987002; 51°34′46″N 1°15′30″W	1200134	Church of St Mary More images
Ham House	Wantage	House	c.1740	22 April 1950	SU3904087434; 51°35′04″N 1°26′17″W	1368457	Upload Photo
32 and 33 Market Place	Wantage	Town house	c.1700	22 April 1950	SU3977187928; 51°35′20″N 1°25′38″W	1048552	32 and 33 Market Place
Church of St Laurence	West Challow	Church	Late 12th century	24 November 1966	SU3666688328; 51°35′33″N 1°28′20″W	1052756	Church of St Laurence More images
Church of St James	West Hanney	Church	c.1150	24 November 1966	SU4061992800; 51°37′57″N 1°24′52″W	1300859	Church of St James More images
West Hanney House and attached archways	West Hanney	Vicarage	1727	25 October 1951	SU4058492888; 51°38′00″N 1°24′54″W	1300843	West Hanney House and attached archways More images
Church of All Saints	Woolstone	Church	c.1200	21 November 1966	SU2943987599; 51°35′11″N 1°34′35″W	1199074	Church of All Saints More images

== See also ==
- Grade I listed buildings in Vale of White Horse
- Grade II* listed buildings in Cherwell (district)
- Grade II* listed buildings in Oxford
- Grade II* listed buildings in South Oxfordshire
- Grade II* listed buildings in West Oxfordshire
