= Old Town Hall, Faringdon =

Municipal building in Faringdon, Oxfordshire, England

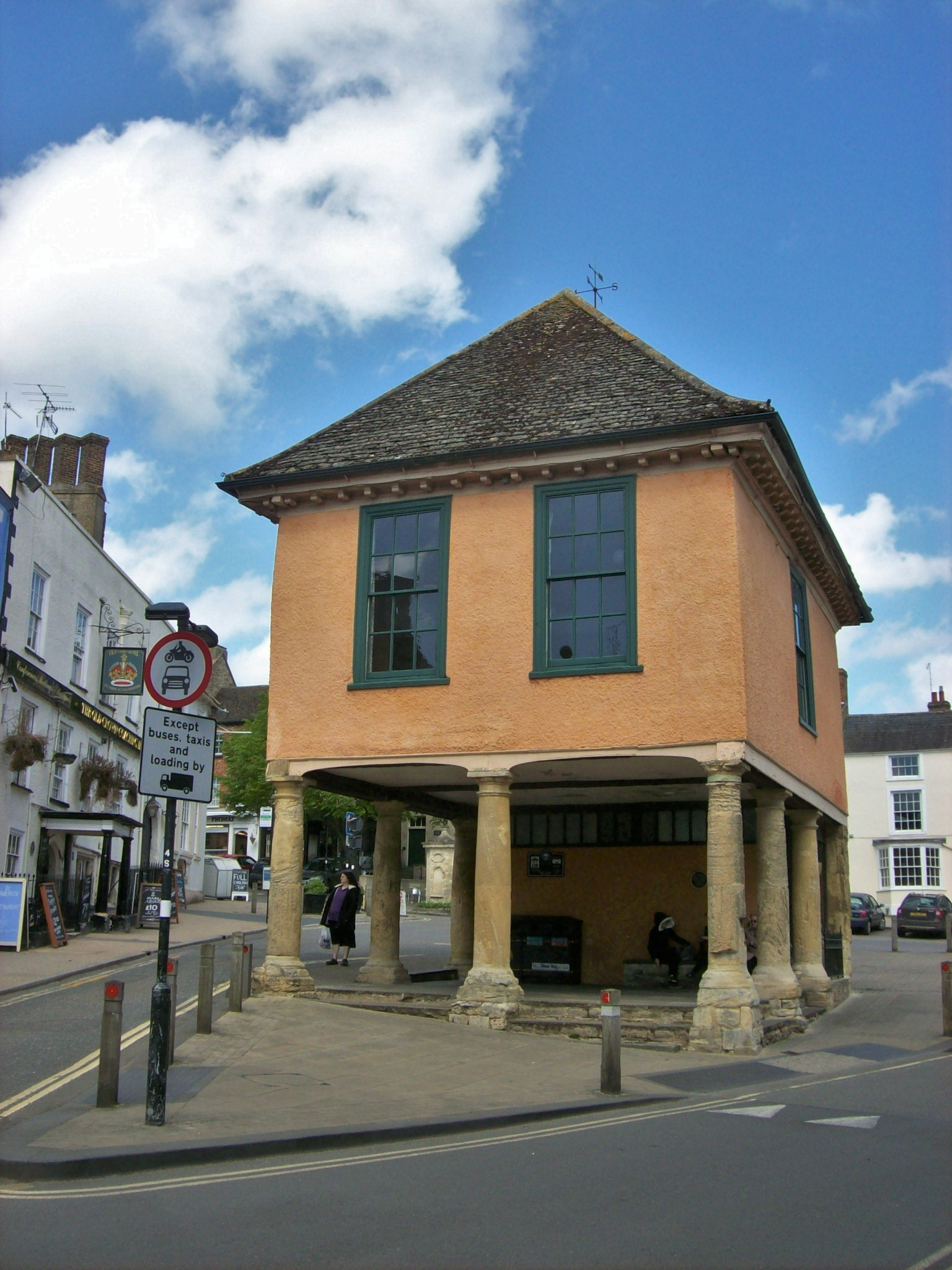
- Old Town Hall, Faringdon

- Shown in Oxfordshire
- 51.6583°N 1.5839°W
- Location: Market Place, Faringdon

History
- Built: 1650–1660

Site notes
- Architectural style: Neoclassical style

Listed Building – Grade II*
- Official name: Old Town Hall
- Designated: 12 February 1958
- Reference no.: 1048440

The Old Town Hall is a municipal building in the Market Place in Faringdon, Oxfordshire, England. The building, which is used as an exhibitions and events venue, is a Grade II* listed building.

== History ==
Following the Battle of Faringdon in 1645, a skirmish in the English Civil War at which many of the town's buildings were damaged or destroyed by the attacking roundhead forces, civic officials decided to build a new market hall. The new building was designed in the neoclassical style, built using timber frame construction techniques with a stucco finish and was completed by 1660. The ground floor was arcaded, so that butter markets could be held, with an assembly hall on the first floor. On the ground floor, there were twelve Tuscan order columns, while the first floor was fenestrated by two sash windows on each of the east and west sides and by a single sash window on the south side. Above, there was a modillioned cornice surmounted by a hipped roof with a weather vane. The architectural historian, Nikolaus Pevsner, described the building as "smaller and more provincial" than the other town halls in the area.

A metal hoop was attached to the southwest column to bind petty criminals for whipping and a lock-up was established in the north east corner for incarcerating them. In the 19th century, an extension was built to the west to accommodate a larger lock-up. After a police station, with proper cells, was established in Swan Lane in the 1880s, the western extension was converted to accommodate the equipment used by the local street sweeper. By the mid-19th century, the assembly room was being used as a public reading room but by the 1880s it was not used at all. The local horse-drawn fire engine, which had been stored in Church Street, was moved to the ground floor of the town hall in the early 20th century.

In 1918, the lord of the manor, Lord Berners of Faringdon House, who had recently inherited the town hall along with the estate and, with it, a significant liability for backlog maintenance on the town hall, decided to give the building to the town. May Morris of Kelmscott Manor led a successful campaign to refurbish the building and to install a series of oak panels on the south side of the building to commemorate the lives of local service personnel who had died in the First World War. The oak panels were unveiled by Lord Faringdon on 6 February 1921.

During the Second World War, the assembly hall was used as sleeping accommodation for officers of the armed services and after the war it was used as a public library. After the library service moved to The Elms in Gloucester Street in the late 1980s, the assembly room became a Red Cross charity shop. A new staircase was installed, and the assembly room was converted for use as an exhibition and events space in 2000. Fabrics designed by William Morris were used in later refurbishment work to honour the work of his daughter, May, in saving the building. The assembly room was also subsequently used for as a venue for parish meetings.

== See also ==
- Grade II* listed buildings in Vale of White Horse
