= Grade II* listed buildings in Oxford =

There are over 20,000 Grade II* listed buildings in England. This page is a list of these buildings in the district of Oxford in Oxfordshire.

== List of buildings ==
Name	Location	Type	Completed (Note: The date given is the date used by Historic England as significant for the initial building or that of an important part in the structure's description.)	Date designated	Grid ref. (Note: The grid reference is based on the British national grid reference system, sometimes known as OSGB36, used by the Ordnance Survey.) Geo-coordinates	Entry number (Note: The "List Entry Number" is a unique number assigned to each listed building and scheduled monument by Historic England.)	Image
Church of St Mary and St Nicholas	Littlemore	Church	1836	18 July 1963	SP5375502770; 51°43′16″N 1°13′24″W	1047667	Church of St Mary and St Nicholas More images
Minchery Farmhouse	Littlemore	Farmhouse	c. 1600	18 July 1963	SP5453502285; 51°43′00″N 1°12′43″W	1047672	Minchery Farmhouse More images
All Souls College, Warden's Lodging	All Souls College	House	1704	12 January 1954	SP5171106285; 51°45′10″N 1°15′08″W	1046756	All Souls College, Warden's Lodging More images
Bartlemas House	Oxford	House	1649	12 January 1954	SP5346805502; 51°44′44″N 1°13′37″W	1047331	Bartlemas House More images
Beam Hall, with Number 3 Merton Street	Oxford	House	15th century and c. 1600	12 January 1954	SP5169806119; 51°45′05″N 1°15′09″W	1369414	Beam Hall, with Number 3 Merton Street More images
Blue Boar Quadrangle at Christ Church	Oxford	College lodgings	1968	10 October 2006	SP5144606109; 51°45′05″N 1°15′22″W	1408741	Blue Boar Quadrangle at Christ Church More images
Brasenose College Staircase 16, 17 and 18	Brasenose College	College lodgings	1961	30 March 1998	SP5151106259; 51°45′10″N 1°15′19″W	1369494	Brasenose College Staircase 16, 17 and 18
C Wing including the Round Tower	Oxford Castle	Prison	From 1785, perhaps partly on 13th century foundations	28 June 1972	SP5100206087; 51°45′04″N 1°15′45″W	1047045	C Wing including the Round Tower More images
Campion Hall (including Chapel and Micklen Hall)	Campion Hall	College building incorporating house	1936 and late 17th/early 18th century	12 January 1954	SP5131205936; 51°44′59″N 1°15′29″W	1046738	Campion Hall (including Chapel and Micklen Hall) More images
Christ Church Picture Gallery	Oxford	Art gallery	1965–68	24 April 1998	SP5156506037; 51°45′02″N 1°15′16″W	1323703	Christ Church Picture Gallery More images
Christ Church: wall and screen facing Oriel Square in the north east corner of the college	Christ Church	Gate	18th century	28 June 1972	SP5157206130; 51°45′05″N 1°15′16″W	1046744	Christ Church: wall and screen facing Oriel Square in the north east corner of the college
Church of St Aldate	Oxford	Church	12th century	12 January 1954	SP5135505999; 51°45′01″N 1°15′27″W	1100244	Church of St Aldate More images
St Andrew's Church, Headington	Oxford	Church	Mid-12th century	12 January 1954	SP5446507635; 51°45′53″N 1°12′44″W	1348376	St Andrew's Church, Headington More images
Church of St Clement	Oxford	Church	1827–28	12 January 1954	SP5270606330; 51°45′11″N 1°14′16″W	1369413	Church of St Clement More images
Church of St Ebbe	Oxford	Church	13th century	12 January 1954	SP5120306024; 51°45′02″N 1°15′35″W	1047355	Church of St Ebbe More images
Church of St Frideswide	Oxford	Church	1872	29 January 1968	SP5015406191; 51°45′08″N 1°16′29″W	1369349	Church of St Frideswide More images
Church of St James	Oxford	Church	Late 12th century	12 January 1954	SP5398403825; 51°43′50″N 1°13′11″W	1185096	Church of St James More images
County Hall with the curving screen walls and turrets on either side	Oxford	Local government office with lamp brackets	1841	29 January 1968	SP5105306158; 51°45′06″N 1°15′43″W	1047201	County Hall with the curving screen walls and turrets on either side More images
Exeter College, Chapel on north side of quadrangle, Main Quadrangle	Exeter College	College chapel	1859	12 January 1954	SP5144406400; 51°45′14″N 1°15′22″W	1046721	Exeter College, Chapel on north side of quadrangle, Main Quadrangle More images
Frewin Hall	Oxford	House	1582	12 January 1954	SP5117006253; 51°45′10″N 1°15′36″W	1122646	Frewin Hall
Garden House approximately 50 metres ENE of Number 16 (St Giles House)	Oxford	Garden house	c. 1737	27 July 1989	SP5126406840; 51°45′28″N 1°15′31″W	1047042	Upload Photo
Gates and piers at Number 16, St Giles'	Oxford	Gate	c. 1702	28 June 1972	SP5120306809; 51°45′27″N 1°15′34″W	1359647	Gates and piers at Number 16, St Giles' More images
Grandpont House	Oxford	House	c. 1785	12 January 1954	SP5150305450; 51°44′43″N 1°15′20″W	1299941	Grandpont House More images
Greyfriars, 21 Paradise Street	Oxford	House	Late 17th century	12 January 1954	SP5101806037; 51°45′03″N 1°15′44″W	1369431	Greyfriars, 21 Paradise Street
Headington Hill Hall and attached forecourt wall	Oxford	Country house	1856–58	7 December 1992	SP5316806547; 51°45′18″N 1°13′52″W	1047044	Headington Hill Hall and attached forecourt wall More images
Hertford College, East Range	Hertford College	University college	1740	12 January 1954	SP5164706433; 51°45′15″N 1°15′11″W	1369641	Hertford College, East Range More images
Hertford College, West Range	Hertford College	College lodgings	1820–22	12 January 1954	SP5161206424; 51°45′15″N 1°15′13″W	1046724	Hertford College, West Range More images
Holywell Music Room	Oxford	Music room	1742–48	12 January 1954	SP5164406554; 51°45′19″N 1°15′12″W	1047232	Holywell Music Room More images
Keble College, De Breyne and Hayward Buildings, including Middle Common Room and bar, Fellows flat, transformer station, workshops and gates	Oxford	Apartment	1971–73	4 October 1999	SP5131006884; 51°45′30″N 1°15′29″W	1130378	Keble College, De Breyne and Hayward Buildings, including Middle Common Room and bar, Fellows flat, transformer station, workshops and gates More images
Kemp Hall	Oxford	Cross-passage house	1637	12 January 1954	SP5142506168; 51°45′07″N 1°15′23″W	1145872	Kemp Hall
Magdalen Bridge	Oxford	Bridge	1772–90	12 January 1954	SP5213106102; 51°45′04″N 1°14′46″W	1369360	Magdalen Bridge More images
Magdalen College, boundary wall of the Grove	Magdalen College	Boundary wall	Late 15th century	12 January 1954	SP5199606541; 51°45′19″N 1°14′53″W	1046708	Magdalen College, boundary wall of the Grove More images
Magdalen College, the New School Room, now New Library	Magdalen College	Library	1851	12 January 1954	SP5197806241; 51°45′09″N 1°14′54″W	1283219	Magdalen College, the New School Room, now New Library More images
Magdalen College, the Old Grammar Hall	Magdalen College	University college	1614	12 January 1954	SP5205806239; 51°45′09″N 1°14′50″W	1046706	Magdalen College, the Old Grammar Hall More images
Magdalen Gate House	Oxford	Gatehouse	Late 18th century	12 January 1954	SP5199106188; 51°45′07″N 1°14′54″W	1047287	Magdalen Gate House More images
Mansfield College	Mansfield College	Theological college	1886	12 January 1954	SP5164606817; 51°45′28″N 1°15′11″W	1046678	Mansfield College More images
Merton College, South Range Hall, Front Quadrangle	Merton College	Assembly hall	13th century	12 January 1954	SP5173906078; 51°45′04″N 1°15′07″W	1369660	Merton College, South Range Hall, Front Quadrangle More images
New College, iron screen, Garden Quadrangle	New College	University college	1711	12 January 1954	SP5183306407; 51°45′14″N 1°15′02″W	1046689	New College, iron screen, Garden Quadrangle More images
Pembroke College, Master's Lodging	Pembroke College	Teachers' house, former Almshouses	Early 16th century, converted 1927	12 January 1954	SP5138405965; 51°45′00″N 1°15′25″W	1046665	Pembroke College, Master's Lodging More images
Pembroke College, Staircase 16 (part of)	Pembroke College	College lodgings	Early 17th century	12 January 1954	SP5129006027; 51°45′02″N 1°15′30″W	1046667	Pembroke College, Staircase 16 (part of)
Florey Building, Queen's College	St Clement's	College lodgings	1971	12 March 2009	SP5234306082; 51°45′03″N 1°14′35″W	1393211	Florey Building, Queen's College More images
Iffley Rectory	Oxford	Vicarage	13th century	12 January 1954	SP5268803478; 51°43′39″N 1°14′19″W	1047193	Iffley Rectory More images
Rhodes House	Oxford	University building with Library	1929	12 January 1954	SP5151906809; 51°45′27″N 1°15′18″W	1076964	Rhodes House More images
St Bartholomew's Farmhouse	Oxford	Farmhouse	16th century	12 January 1954	SP5342805470; 51°44′43″N 1°13′39″W	1299369	St Bartholomew's Farmhouse More images
St Peter's College, Master's Lodge, former Oxford Canal Company offices	St Peter's College	University college, former office	1829	12 January 1954	SP5109006222; 51°45′09″N 1°15′41″W	1046618	St Peter's College, Master's Lodge, former Oxford Canal Company offices More images
Stable wing and garden walls of Iffley Rectory	Oxford	Gate	18th century	12 January 1954	SP5259503519; 51°43′41″N 1°14′24″W	1369399	Stable wing and garden walls of Iffley Rectory
Stones Almshouses (8 tenements)	Oxford	Almshouse	1700	12 January 1954	SP5251305999; 51°45′01″N 1°14′27″W	1047125	Stones Almshouses (8 tenements)
The Judges Lodging	Oxford	House	1702	12 January 1954	SP5121206821; 51°45′28″N 1°15′34″W	1047136	The Judges Lodging More images
Summertown Villa, formerly The Lodge, 304, Woodstock Road	Oxford	Villa	c. 1830	6 June 2001	SP5044709435; 51°46′53″N 1°16′13″W	1246138	Summertown Villa, formerly The Lodge, 304, Woodstock Road
The Martyrs' Memorial	Oxford	Commemorative monument	1841	12 January 1954	SP5124506525; 51°45′18″N 1°15′32″W	1107172	The Martyrs' Memorial More images
The Mitre Hotel	Oxford	Inn	c. 1300	12 January 1954	SP5145006222; 51°45′08″N 1°15′22″W	1369357	The Mitre Hotel More images
The Playhouse, Beaumont Street	Oxford	Theatre	1938	12 January 1954	SP5107406499; 51°45′17″N 1°15′41″W	1185150	The Playhouse, Beaumont Street More images
The Radcliffe Infirmary (Main Block)	Oxford	Infirmary	1759–70	12 January 1954	SP5100907073; 51°45′36″N 1°15′44″W	1047066	The Radcliffe Infirmary (Main Block) More images
Rhodes Building, north range of St Mary's Quad, Oriel College	Oxford	University college	1909–11	28 June 1972	SP5161406233; 51°45′09″N 1°15′13″W	1046662	Rhodes Building, north range of St Mary's Quad, Oriel College More images
The University Printing House (the Clarendon Press)	Oxford	Printing works	1826–28	12 January 1954	SP5085806914; 51°45′31″N 1°15′52″W	1052359	The University Printing House (the Clarendon Press) More images
Oxford Town Hall, Municipal Buildings and Library	Oxford	Local government office	1893–97	12 January 1954	SP5137906136; 51°45′06″N 1°15′26″W	1047153	Oxford Town Hall, Municipal Buildings and Library More images
Trinity College, gatepiers and grille	Trinity College	Gate pier	1713	12 January 1954	SP5149906626; 51°45′21″N 1°15′19″W	1046630	Trinity College, gatepiers and grille More images
Trinity College, Kettell Hall	Trinity College	House	1618–20	12 January 1954	SP5146006476; 51°45′17″N 1°15′21″W	1230901	Trinity College, Kettell Hall
Tudor House, 94 High Street/1 Magpie Lane	Oxford	Timber-framed house	16th century	12 January 1954	SP5164006239; 51°45′09″N 1°15′12″W	1369388	Tudor House, 94 High Street/1 Magpie Lane More images
University of Oxford, St Cross Building	Oxford	University building with libraries	1961–65	30 March 1993	SP5200906758; 51°45′26″N 1°14′52″W	1369496	University of Oxford, St Cross Building More images
Vanbrugh House, St Michael's Street	Oxford	House	17th century	12 January 1954	SP5119406340; 51°45′12″N 1°15′35″W	1068871	Vanbrugh House, St Michael's Street
Wadham College, South Block	Wadham College	Gate	1694, c. 1796	12 January 1954	SP5154606566; 51°45′20″N 1°15′17″W	1046599	Wadham College, South Block More images
26 Ship Street	Oxford	House	15th century	12 January 1954	SP5129206349; 51°45′13″N 1°15′30″W	1047091	26 Ship Street More images
24–37 Beaumont Street	Oxford	House	1828–37	12 January 1954	SP5106406525; 51°45′18″N 1°15′42″W	1047375	24–37 Beaumont Street More images
86 and 87 High Street	Oxford	House	Early 17th century	12 January 1954	SP5181206244; 51°45′09″N 1°15′03″W	1047248	86 and 87 High Street
35 Holywell Street	Oxford	House	1626	12 January 1954	SP5163006534; 51°45′18″N 1°15′12″W	1047234	35 Holywell Street More images
41 St Giles'	Oxford	House	c. 1700	12 January 1954	SP5113806808; 51°45′27″N 1°15′38″W	1047144	41 St Giles' More images
12 Oriel Street	Oxford	Timber-framed house	17th century	12 January 1954	SP5159106165; 51°45′07″N 1°15′15″W	1047173	12 Oriel Street
82 and 83 St Aldates Street	Oxford	House	15th century	12 January 1954	SP5140405834; 51°44′56″N 1°15′24″W	1047154	82 and 83 St Aldates Street More images
106 and 107 High Street	Oxford	House	14th century	12 January 1954	SP5156806218; 51°45′08″N 1°15′16″W	1047253	106 and 107 High Street More images
6 High Street	Oxford	House	Late 18th century	12 January 1954	SP5137106206; 51°45′08″N 1°15′26″W	1047311	6 High Street
40 St Giles'	Oxford	House	Late 17th century	12 January 1954	SP5112706816; 51°45′28″N 1°15′38″W	1068575	40 St Giles' More images
13 and 14 Pembroke Street	Oxford	House	1641; altered in 18th–19th centuries	12 January 1954	SP5131806023; 51°45′02″N 1°15′29″W	1099196	13 and 14 Pembroke Street
38 Pembroke Street	Oxford	Timber-framed house	17th century	12 January 1954	SP5129306040; 51°45′03″N 1°15′30″W	1369435	38 Pembroke Street
53 and 54 St Giles'	Oxford	House	c. 1600	12 January 1954	SP5115406743; 51°45′25″N 1°15′37″W	1369439	53 and 54 St Giles' More images
118 High Street	Oxford	House	16th century, refronted in 19th century	12 January 1954	SP5149206202; 51°45′08″N 1°15′20″W	1047257	118 High Street More images
3 Cornmarket Street	Oxford	House	15th to 17th century	12 January 1954	SP5134006215; 51°45′08″N 1°15′28″W	1185643	3 Cornmarket Street

== See also ==
- Grade I listed buildings in Oxford
- Grade II listed buildings in Oxford
- Grade II* listed buildings in Cherwell (district)
- Grade II* listed buildings in South Oxfordshire
- Grade II* listed buildings in Vale of White Horse
- Grade II* listed buildings in West Oxfordshire
