= Clattercote =

Hamlet in Oxfordshire, England

Coordinates: 52.139°N 1.330°W

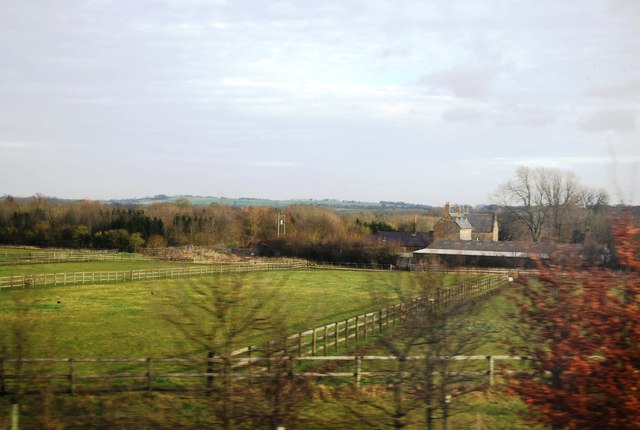

- Location within Oxfordshire
- OS grid reference: SP4549
- Civil parish: Claydon with Clattercot
- District: Cherwell
- Shire county: Oxfordshire
- Region: South East
- Country: England
- Sovereign state: United Kingdom
- Post town: Banbury
- Postcode district: OX17
- Dialling code: 01295
- Police: Thames Valley
- Fire: Oxfordshire
- Ambulance: South Central
- UK Parliament: Banbury
- Website: Claydon with Clattercote Parish Council

Clattercote or Clattercot is a hamlet in the civil parish of Claydon with Clattercot, in the Cherwell district, in Oxfordshire, England, just over 5.5 miles (8.9 km) north of Banbury.

== History ==
In the 12th century Robert de Chesney, Bishop of Lincoln granted land at Clattercote to the Gilbertine Order, on which they founded a small priory dedicated to Saint Leonard. The priory was dissolved in 1538 in the Dissolution of the Monasteries. In 1551 King Henry VIII granted the former priory and its lands to Christ Church, Oxford. The college was still the freeholder in 1969.

The Priory seems to have had a leper's pool in which leprous inmates were bathed. Remains of a paved walk around the former pool have been discovered. By the 18th century the leper's pool was known as the "great fish pond".

The priory was extensively rebuilt as a moated farmhouse, Priory Farm. The eastern range of the farmhouse includes parts of the priory dating from late in the 13th or early in the 14th century. By 1614 the remainder of the priory had been demolished and replaced with a large L-shaped house. The central wing of this house survives but by 1717 the west wing had been demolished. The present west wing had been built in its place by 1729.

In 1777 the Oxford Canal was being extended southwards past Clattercote from Fenny Compton in Warwickshire to Cropredy in Oxfordshire, and the canal company enlarged the great fish pond to form Clattercote Reservoir to feed the canal. In 1787 the company enlarged the reservoir to its present area of 21 acres (8.5 ha). There is a Clattercote Wharf on the canal about 0.5 miles (800 m) east of Priory Farm.

In 1852 the Great Western Railway built its Oxford and Rugby Railway from Oxford to Fenny Compton past Clattercote, passing just west of Priory Farm. Clattercote's nearest station was 2 miles (3.2 km) to the south at Cropredy, until British Railways closed it in 1956.

Clattercote was historically an extra-parochial area, outside any parish. In 1858 most such areas, including Clattercote, were reclassified as civil parishes. In 1932 Clattercote was merged with the neighbouring parish of Claydon to form a new civil parish called "Claydon with Clattercot". At the 1931 census (the last before the abolition of the parish), Clattercote had a population of 5.

== Sources ==
- Compton, Hugh J. (1976). The Oxford Canal. Newton Abbot: David & Charles. ISBN 0-7153-7238-6.
- Christina Colvin; Janet Cooper; N.H. Cooper; P.D.A. Harvey; Marjory Hollings; Judith Hook; Mary Jessup; Mary D. Lobel; J.F.A. Mason; B.S. Trinder; Hilary Turner (1972). Crosley, Alan (ed.). Victoria County History: A History of the County of Oxford, Volume 10. pp. 194–197.
- Sherwood, Jennifer; Pevsner, Nikolaus (1974). The Buildings of England: Oxfordshire. Harmondsworth: Penguin. pp. 547–548. ISBN 0-14-071045-0.
