= Weston-on-the-Green =

Village in Oxfordshire, England

Coordinates: 51.864°N 1.226°W

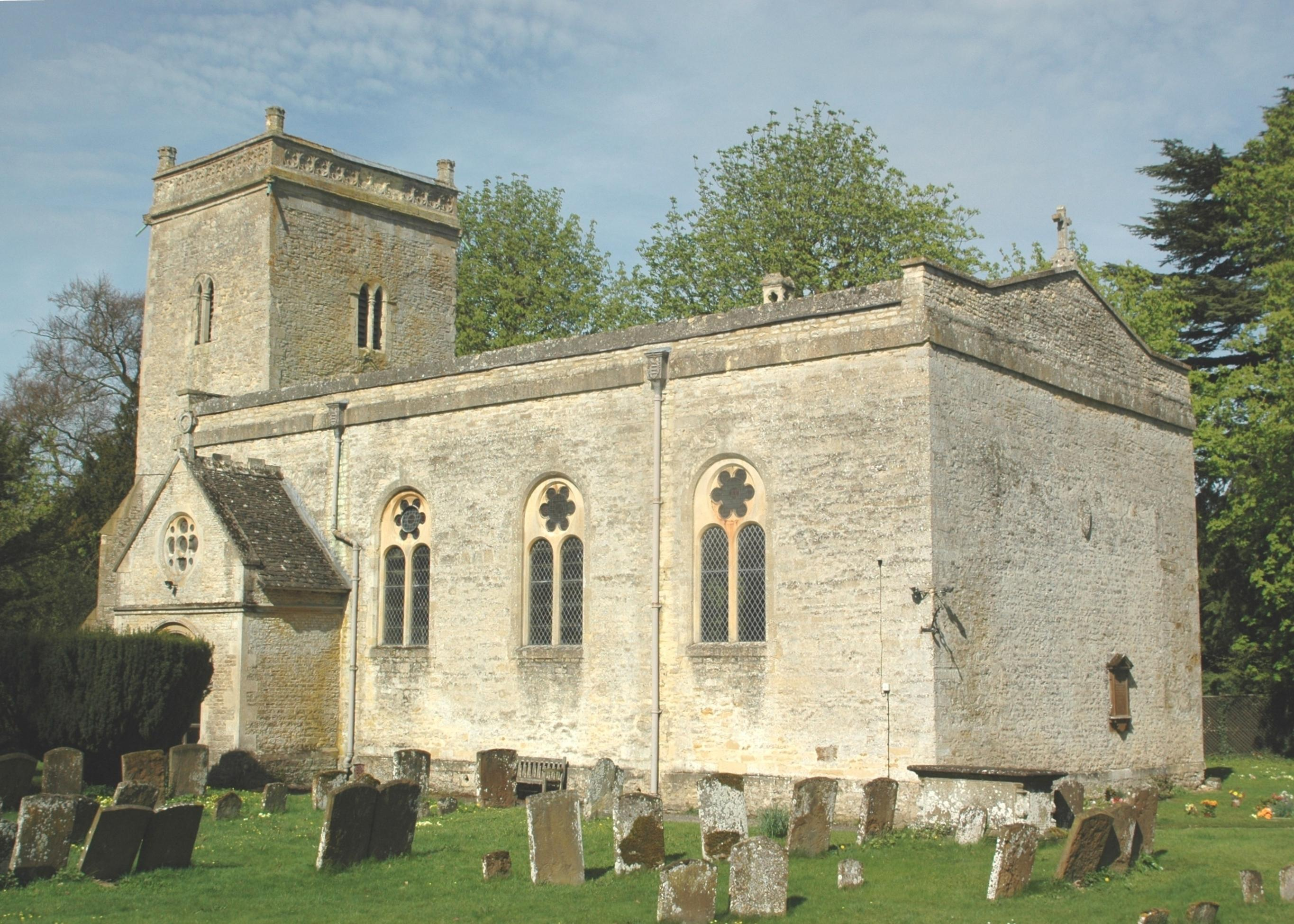
- Parish church of the Blessed Virgin Mary

- Location within Oxfordshire
- Area: 10.05 km^{2} (3.88 sq mi)
- Population: 523 (2011 census)
  - Density: 52/km^{2} (130/sq mi)
- OS grid reference: SP5318
- Civil parish: Weston-on-the-Green
- District: Cherwell
- Shire county: Oxfordshire
- Region: South East
- Country: England
- Sovereign state: United Kingdom
- Post town: Bicester
- Postcode district: OX25
- Dialling code: 01869
- Police: Thames Valley
- Fire: Oxfordshire
- Ambulance: South Central
- UK Parliament: Bicester and Woodstock
- Website: Weston On The Green

Weston-on-the-Green is a village and civil parish in the Cherwell district of Oxfordshire, England, about 4 miles (6 km) southwest of Bicester. The 2011 census recorded the parish population as 523.

== Toponym ==
The toponym "Weston" is derived from Old English. A tūn was a homestead or enclosure. The Domesday Book of 1086 records it as Westone. Variant spellings include Westona, Weston' and Westune.

== Manor ==
Wigod of Wallingford held the manor of Weston at the time of the Norman Conquest of England. Wigod died shortly after the conquest, leaving his estates including Weston to his son-in-law, the Norman baron Robert D'Oyly. Weston descended via Robert's younger brother Nigel D'Oyly to his nephew Robert (II) D'Oyly, who in 1129 founded the Augustinian Osney Abbey and included Weston parish church among its endowments. He or his heirs granted parts of the manor lands at Weston to Osney Abbey, including six virgates given by Robert (II)'s wife Edith and son Henry, and confirmed by his grandson Henry (II) D'Oyly.

In 1137 Edith gave 35 acres (14 ha) at Weston to the new Otley Abbey at Oddington, which later moved to Thame.

Henry (II) D'Oyly sold most of the remainder of the manor to Osney Abbey in 1227, retaining only the house, watermill and demesne lands. He gave the final parts of the manor to the abbey shortly afterwards, probably in 1228. The abbey retained the manor until it surrendered all its lands to the Crown in the dissolution of the monasteries in 1539.

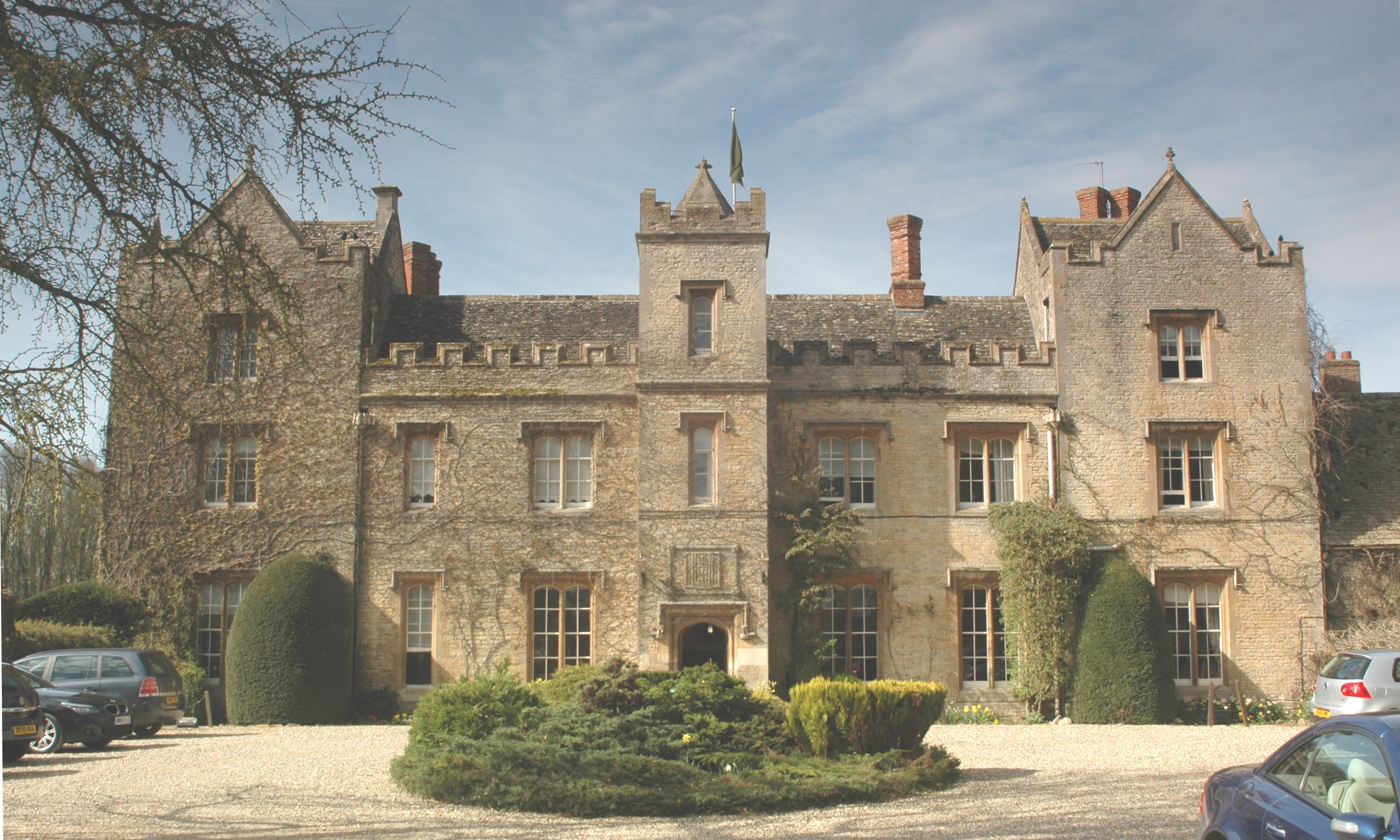
Weston Manor, re-fronted 1820 and renovated 1851

Weston Manor House is a 15th- or early 16th-century building built for Osney Abbey's bailiff. It was built within a 13th-century moat, two sides of which survived until they were filled in. The house was re-fronted in the 16th century and entrance hall has a Tudor fireplace from about this period. In 1665 the house was assessed at 20 hearths for Charles II's hearth tax. The panelling of the drawing room dates from the reign of William III and Mary II just before the end of the 17th century. In about 1780 the 16th-century great hall was renovated with a timber roof frame and linenfold panelling transferred from Notley Abbey in Buckinghamshire. The 16th century front was replaced in about 1820 and the Hon Rev FA Bertie had the house altered and renovated in 1851. Weston Manor is now a hotel.

== Parish church ==
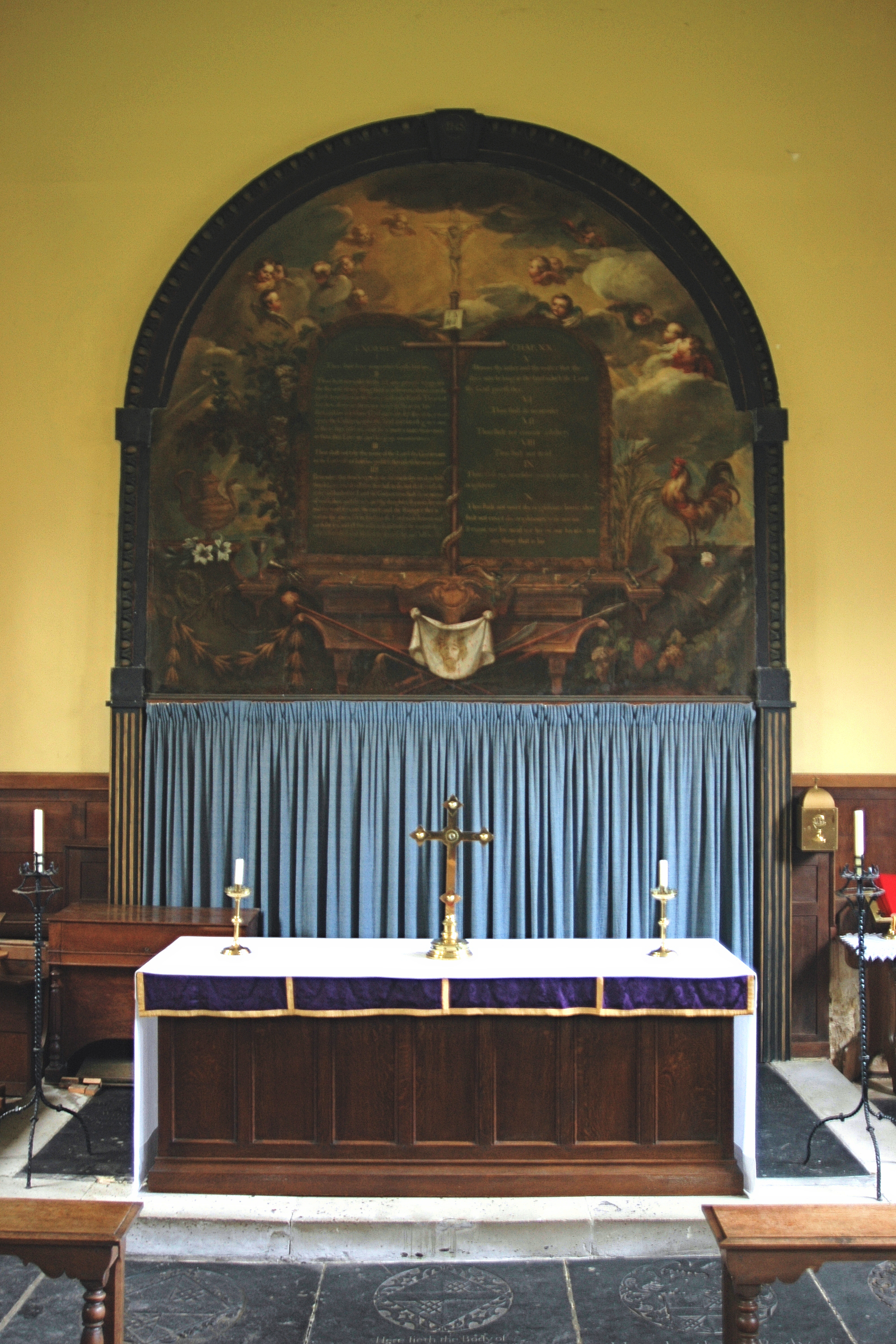
Altar of Blessed Virgin Mary parish church, with Pompeo Batoni altar piece

The earliest surviving parts of the Church of England parish church of the Blessed Virgin Mary are the Norman font and the ground stage of the west tower, which was built around 1200. By 1741 the medieval building was in ruins, and in 1743–44 all but the 13th century bell tower was rebuilt.

The replacement is a characteristically box-like Georgian church, with what were originally plain round-arched windows on the north and south sides. The Georgian building had an ornate plaster ceiling, but this collapsed in 1810. The surviving ornate Georgian surroundings of the south door are of a very high quality.

There is no east window. Instead the blank east wall is dominated by an altarpiece of the Ten Commandments thought to have been painted by the Italian master Pompeo Batoni (1708–87), although this has not been substantiated. Weston-on-the-Green is not the only Oxfordshire parish church thought to have a painting by Batoni. The parish church of Saint Peter, Marsh Baldon, 12 miles (19 km) south of Weston-on-the-Green, has a Batoni painting of the Annunciation.

The architect R. Phené Spiers restored the building in the 1870s, repairing the tower and adding the south porch and new seating. A plan to rebuild the east end with an apse "to make the building more churchlike" was not executed. In 1885 Spiers added a heavy tracery to the Georgian windows and the organ was installed.

The tower used to have three bells, one each cast in the 15th, 16th and 17th centuries. They were replaced in 1870 with ring of five, now six, all of which were cast by Mears and Stainbank of the Whitechapel Bell Foundry. There is also a Sanctus bell cast in 1834 by W&J Taylor, presumably at their Oxford foundry.

The ecclesiastical parish is now a member of the Church of England Benefice of Akeman, which includes the parishes of Bletchingdon, Chesterton, Hampton Gay, Kirtlington, Middleton Stoney and Wendlebury.

Alan Campbell Johnson, who was Press Attaché to Earl Mountbatten of Burma when he was Viceroy of India and author of Mission with Mountbatten, is buried here.

== Social and economic history ==
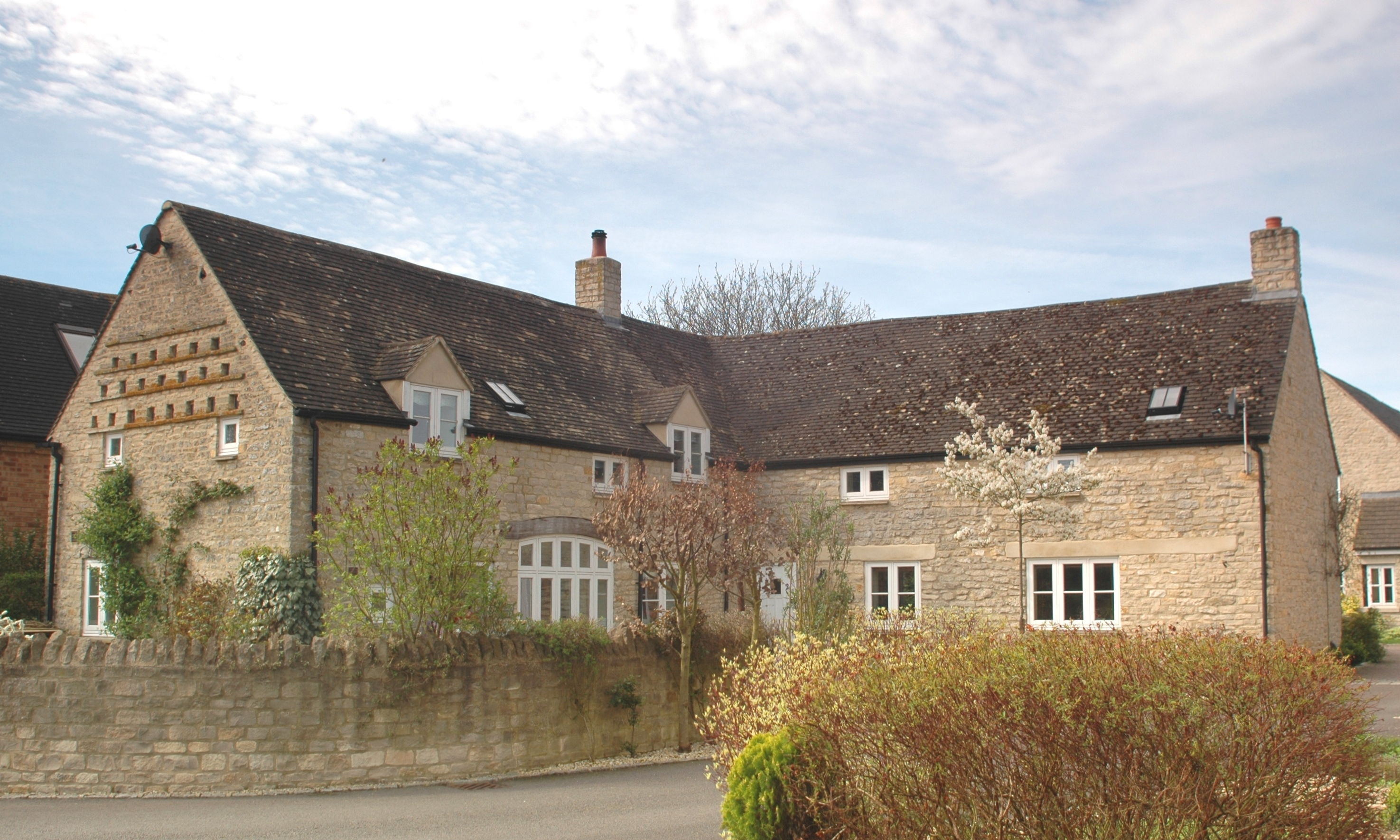
Dovecote Cottage, with former dovecote in its east gable

The Church of England school was opened in 1855. Oxfordshire County Council took it over in 1920 and reorganised it as a junior school in 1937. The village had no electricity until 1931 and the school had none until 1947. The school closed in 1984 and is now a private home.

RAF Weston-on-the-Green is about 1 mile (1.6 km) north of the village. German prisoners of war and Canadian military personnel built it in 1915 for the Royal Flying Corps. It is now a parachute training station.

== Amenities ==
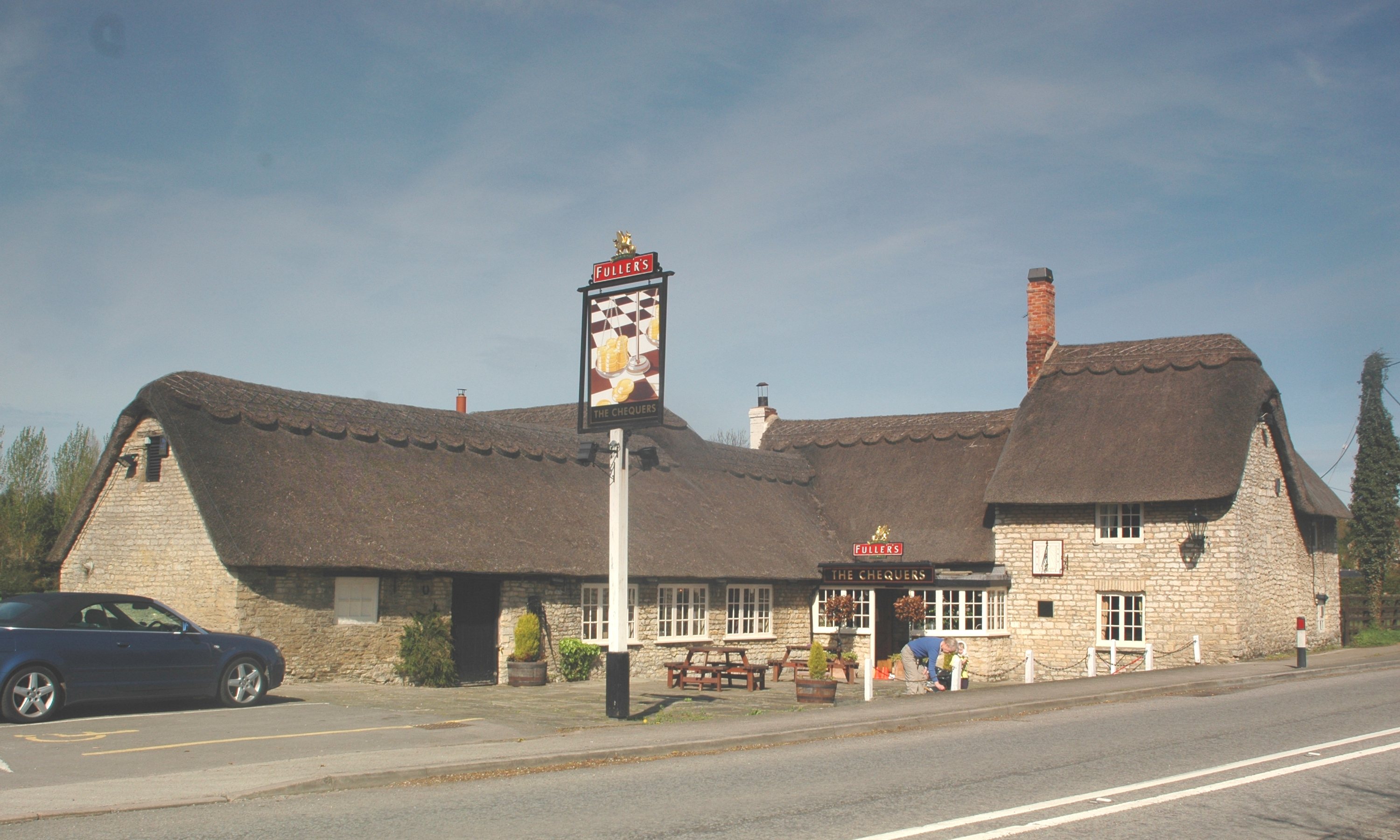
The Chequers public house

Weston-on-the-Green has two public houses: The Chequers controlled by Fuller's Brewery and The Ben Jonson. gastropub controlled by Punch Taverns.

Weston-on-the-Green also has a village shop and post office called Weston Pantry.

The parish has a village hall and a Women's Institute.

=== Public transport ===
Grayline bus route 24 serves Weston-on-the-Green, linking it with Bicester via Wendlebury in one direction and with Oxford via Kirtlington, Bletchingdon and Oxford Parkway in the other. Buses run from Mondays to Saturdays: seven times a day to and from Oxford, and four times a day to and from Bicester. There is no late evening service, and no service on Sundays or bank holidays.

== Sources ==
- Gelling, Margaret (1953). Smith, AH (ed.). The Place-Names of Oxfordshire, Part I. Vol. XXIII. based on material collected by Doris Mary Stenton. Cambridge: Cambridge University Press for the English Place-Name Society.
- Lobel, Mary D, ed. (1959). A History of the County of Oxford: Volume 6. Victoria County History. pp. 346–352.
- Sherwood, Jennifer; Pevsner, Nikolaus (1974). Oxfordshire. The Buildings of England. Harmondsworth: Penguin Books. pp. 833–834. ISBN 0-14-071045-0.
