= Compton Beauchamp House =

Grade I listed building in Oxfordshire, United Kingdom

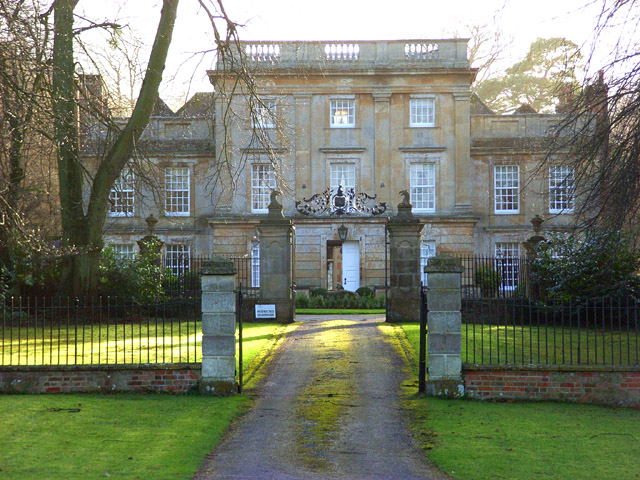

- Location within Oxfordshire
- Alternative names: Compton House

General information
- Type: Country house
- Architectural style: Baroque
- Location: Compton Beauchamp
- Coordinates: 51°34′50″N 1°35′51″W

Compton Beauchamp House (sometimes Compton House) is a Grade I listed building in Compton Beauchamp, Oxfordshire. The house was originally built in the 16th century but its interior was remodelled and its front rebuilt in the Baroque in around 1710. It was owned by the Fettiplace family and is a Grade I listed building.
