= Shipton-on-Cherwell and Thrupp =

Civil parish in Oxfordshire, England

Coordinates: 51.842°N 1.303°W

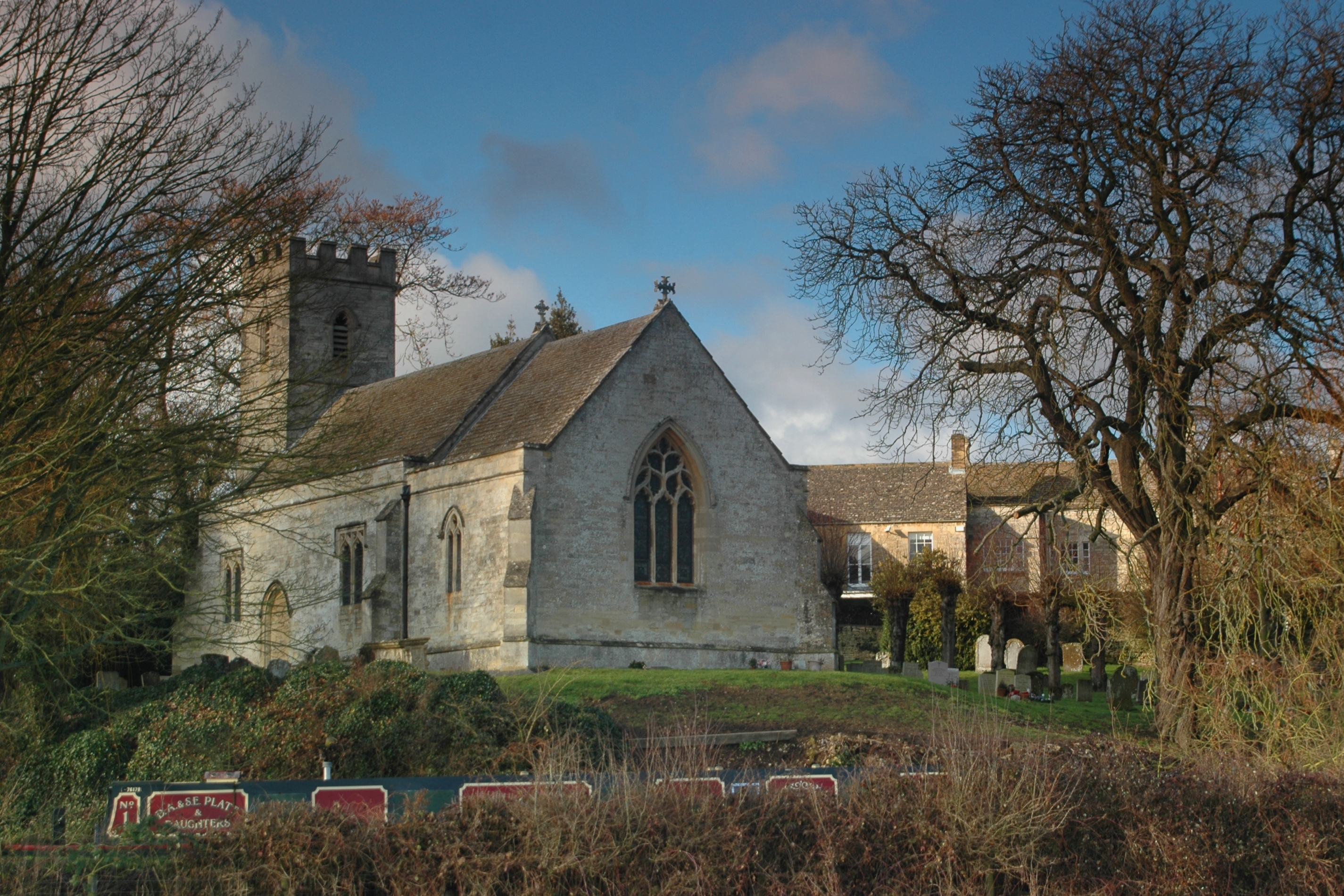
- Shipton-on-Cherwell church

- Location within Oxfordshire
- Population: 493 (2011 census)
- Civil parish: Shipton-on-Cherwell and Thrupp
- District: Cherwell
- Shire county: Oxfordshire
- Region: South East
- Country: England
- Sovereign state: United Kingdom
- UK Parliament: Bicester and Woodstock

Shipton-on-Cherwell and Thrupp is a civil parish in the Cherwell district, in the county of Oxfordshire, England. It was formed in 1955 by removing the hamlet of Thrupp (grid reference SP4815) from the parish of Kidlington and merging it with the parish of Shipton-on-Cherwell (grid reference SP4716). It covers 6.04 km^{2} and as at the 2011 census had 493 residents.

== Sources ==
- Baggs, A.P.; Blair, W.J.; Chance, Eleanor; Colvin, Christina; Cooper, Janet; Day, C.J.; Selwyn, Nesta; Townley, S.C. (2007). Crossley, Alan; Elrington, C.R. (eds.). Victoria County History: A History of the County of Oxford, Volume 12: Wootton Hundred (South) including Woodstock.
