= Claydon with Clattercot =

Civil parish in Oxfordshire, England

Coordinates: 52.149°N 1.331°W

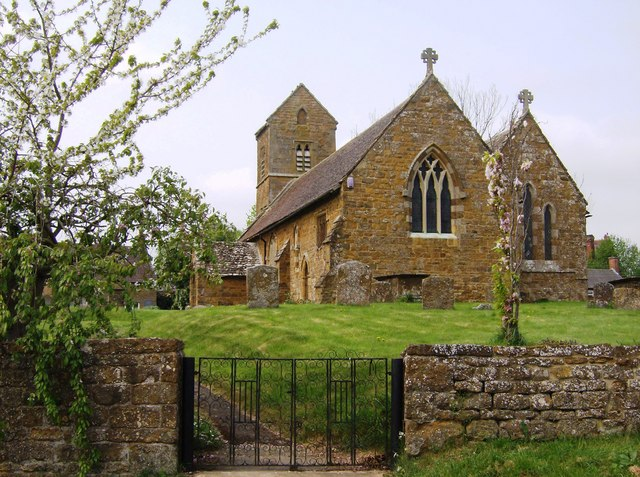
- Claydon church

- Location within Oxfordshire
- Population: 306 (2011 census)
- Civil parish: Claydon with Clattercot
- District: Cherwell
- Shire county: Oxfordshire
- Region: South East
- Country: England
- Sovereign state: United Kingdom
- UK Parliament: Banbury

Claydon with Clattercot is a civil parish in the Cherwell district, in the county of Oxfordshire, England. It was formed in 1932 by merger of the parish of Claydon (grid reference SP4550) with the extra-parochial area of Clattercote (grid reference SP4549). As of the United Kingdom Census 2011, its population was 306 and it had a total of 6.22 km^{2} of land, water, and roads.

== Sources ==
- Christina Colvin; Janet Cooper; N.H. Cooper; P.D.A. Harvey; Marjory Hollings; Judith Hook; Mary Jessup; Mary D. Lobel; J.F.A. Mason; B.S. Trinder; Hilary Turner (1972). Crossley, Alan (ed.). Victoria County History: A History of the County of Oxford, Volume 10. pp. 184–197.
