= The Manor Country House Hotel, Weston-on-the-Green =

Country house hotel in Weston-on-the-Green, Oxfordshire, England

Coordinates: 51°51′43″N 1°13′34″W

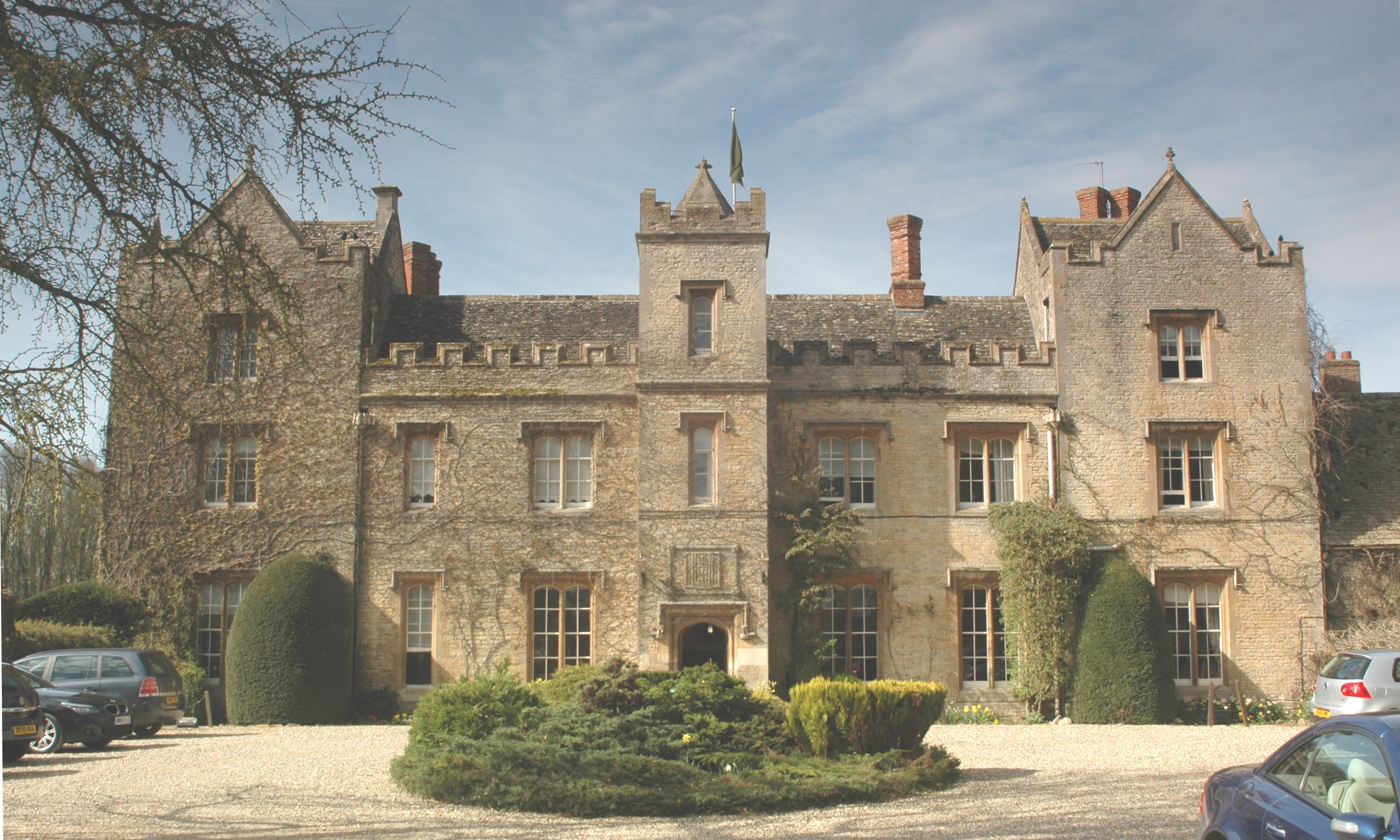
The Manor Country House Hotel

The Manor Country House Hotel in Weston-on-the-Green is a building of historical significance and is Grade II* listed on the English Heritage Register. It was built in the late 15th century and was the home of many notable people over the next five centuries. Today it is a hotel which provides accommodation, restaurant facilities and caters for special events.

== Early history ==
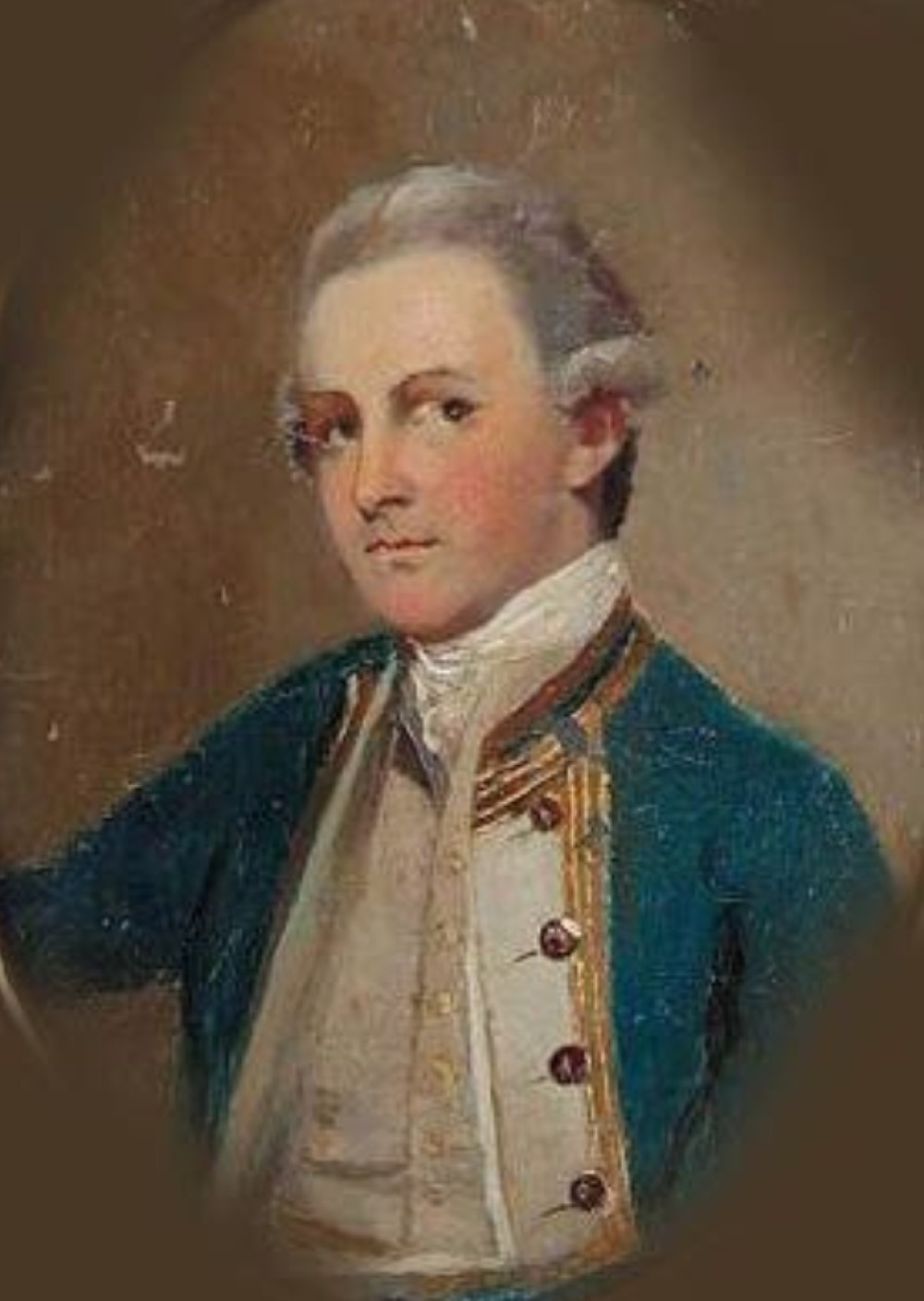
Captain Peregrine Bertie (1741-1790)

In the late 15th century the house was built for the Bailiff of Osney Abbey. It was originally within a 13th-century moat but this has since been filled in.

In the 16th century, the house was re-fronted and the entrance hall and Tudor fireplace constructed. The drawing room paneling dates from about 1680 from the reign of William and Mary. During this time the house was owned by the Norreys family (sometimes spelt Norris) who were influential politicians and landowners. In 1669 Sir Edward Norreys was the owner and when he died in 1712 he passed it to his only surviving son James. When he died in 1718 he bequeathed it to his nephew James Bertie who was Sir Edward’s grandson from his daughter Philadelphia’s marriage to Henry Bertie.

James Bertie (1687-1728) married Elizabeth Harris (1693-1720) and they had one son Norreys Bertie (1717-1766) who inherited Weston Manor when James died in 1728. All three of them are buried in St Mary’s Churchyard at Weston-on-the Green. Norreys Bertie also inherited Notley Abbey, Yattendon and Hampstead Norreys. In 1743 he rebuilt most of St Mary’s Church which is nearby. When Norreys died in 1766 his property was inherited by his nephew Captain Peregrine Bertie.

Captain Peregrine Bertie (1741-1790) was responsible for the additions to the Great Hall. In about 1780 he added a timber rooftop outline and linenfold panelling that had been transferred from his property Notley Abbey in Buckinghamshire. He married late in life and had no heirs so when he died in 1790 the house was inherited by his brother Willoughby Bertie, 4th Earl of Abingdon. He died nine years later in 1799 and Weston Manor was inherited by his son Peregrine Bertie (1790-1849). He retained ownership until his death in 1849. The Tithe map of 1848 records him as the owner and also the occupier of the house.

== Later owners ==
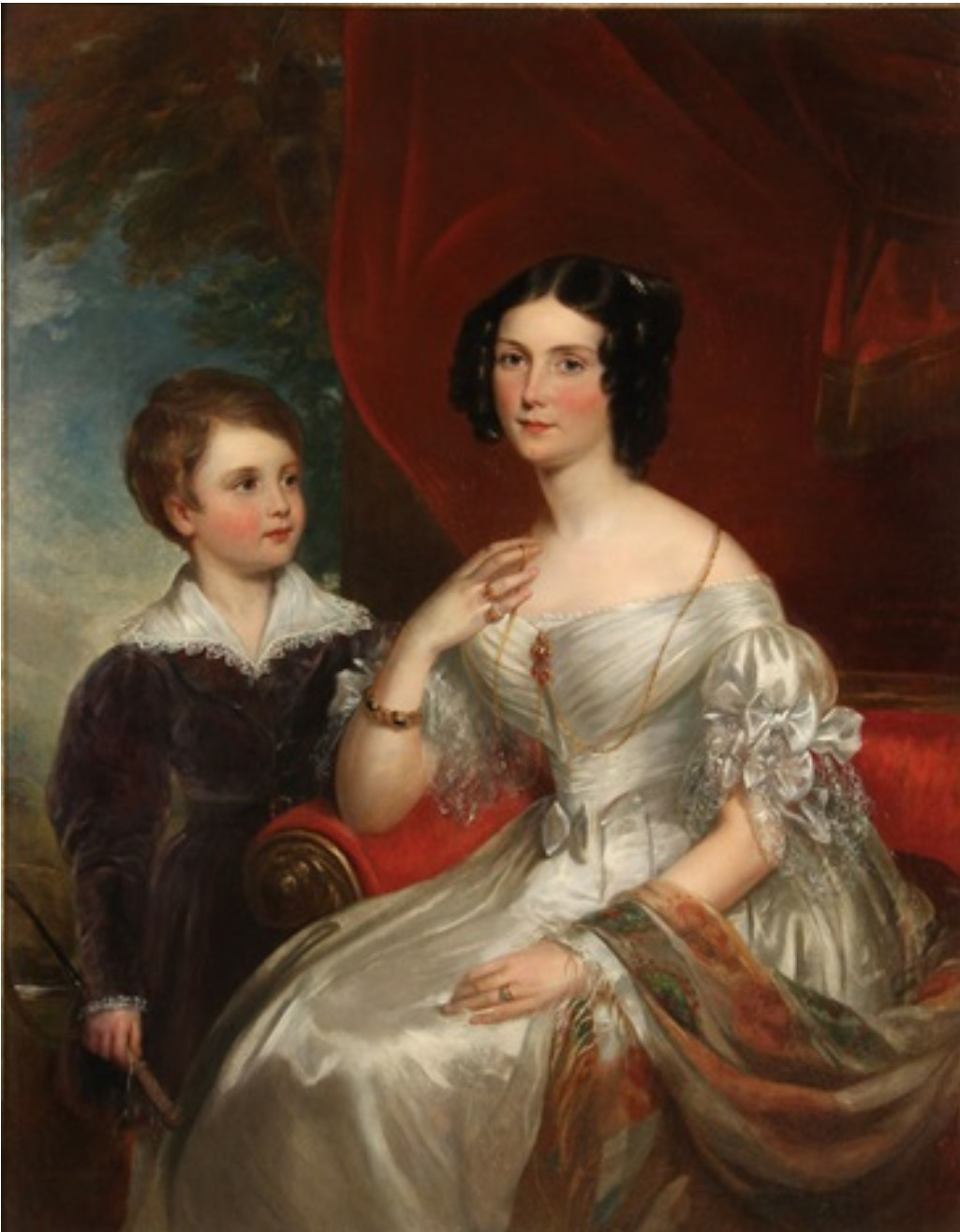
Lady Georgiana Bertie wife of Reverend Frederic Bertie and her son Charles, 1835

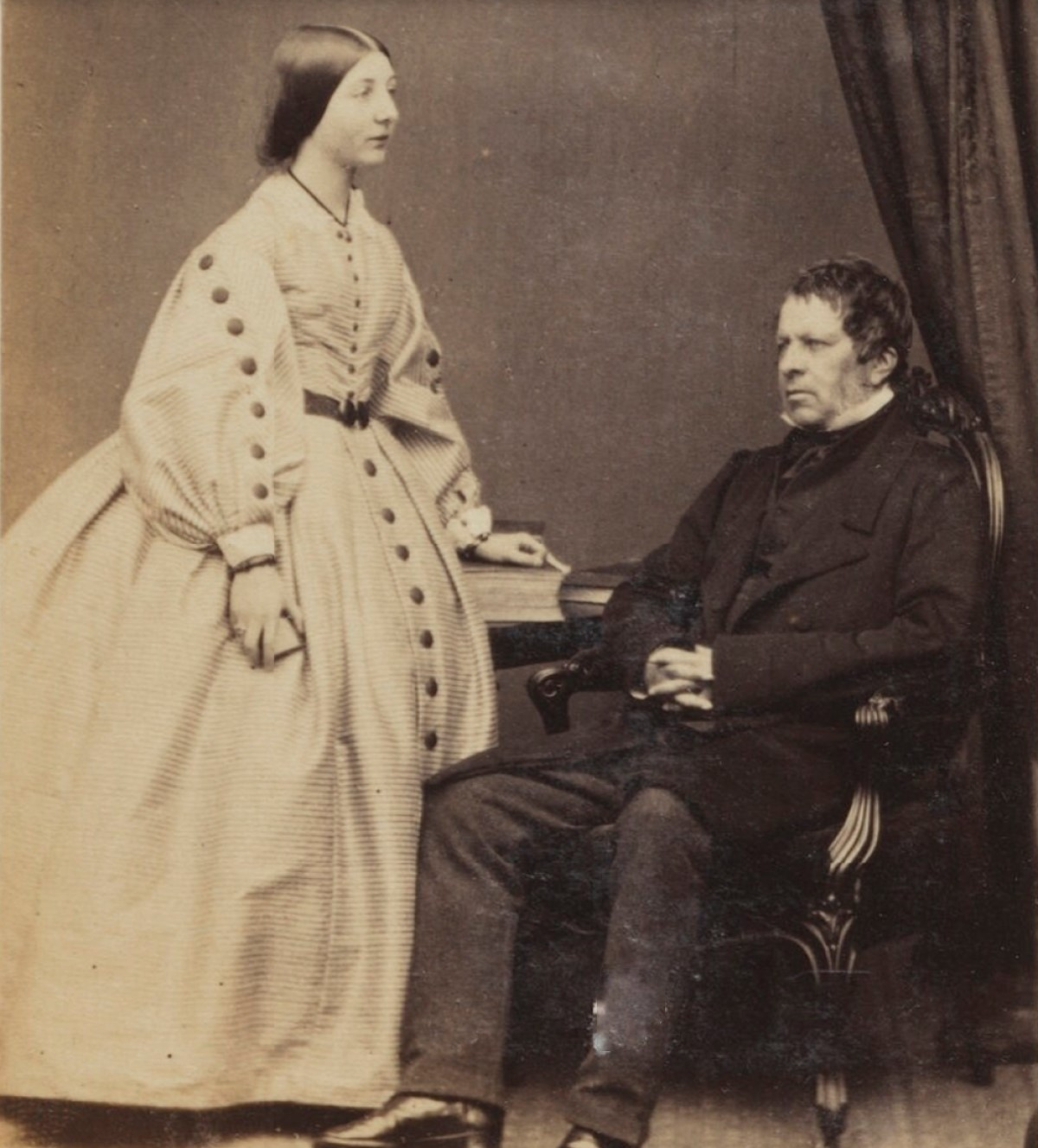
Reverend Frederic Bertie and his daughter Agnes

When Peregrine died in 1849 the house was passed to his younger brother Reverend Frederic Bertie (1793-1868) who in 1851 made major alterations and additions to the house. Frederic was born in 1793 and was educated at the University of Oxford. In 1825 he married Lady Georgiana Anne Emily Kerr who was the daughter of Vice-Admiral Lord Mark Robert Kerr. The couple had ten children. In 1835 the famous artist Sir William Beechey painted Georgiana with her son Charles. The portrait is shown. Also shown is a photograph of Reverend Frederic Bertie with his daughter Agnes.

For many years Frederic was the Vicar at Albury, Oxfordshire and he commuted between his estate and the vicarage at Albury. He died in 1868 and his wife Lady Georgiana continued to live there until her death in 1881. She is recorded in both the 1871 and 1881 Census as living there with her unmarried daughter Agnes and six servants. Agnes remained on the estate until her death in 1900. She lived in a house called “The Cottage”.

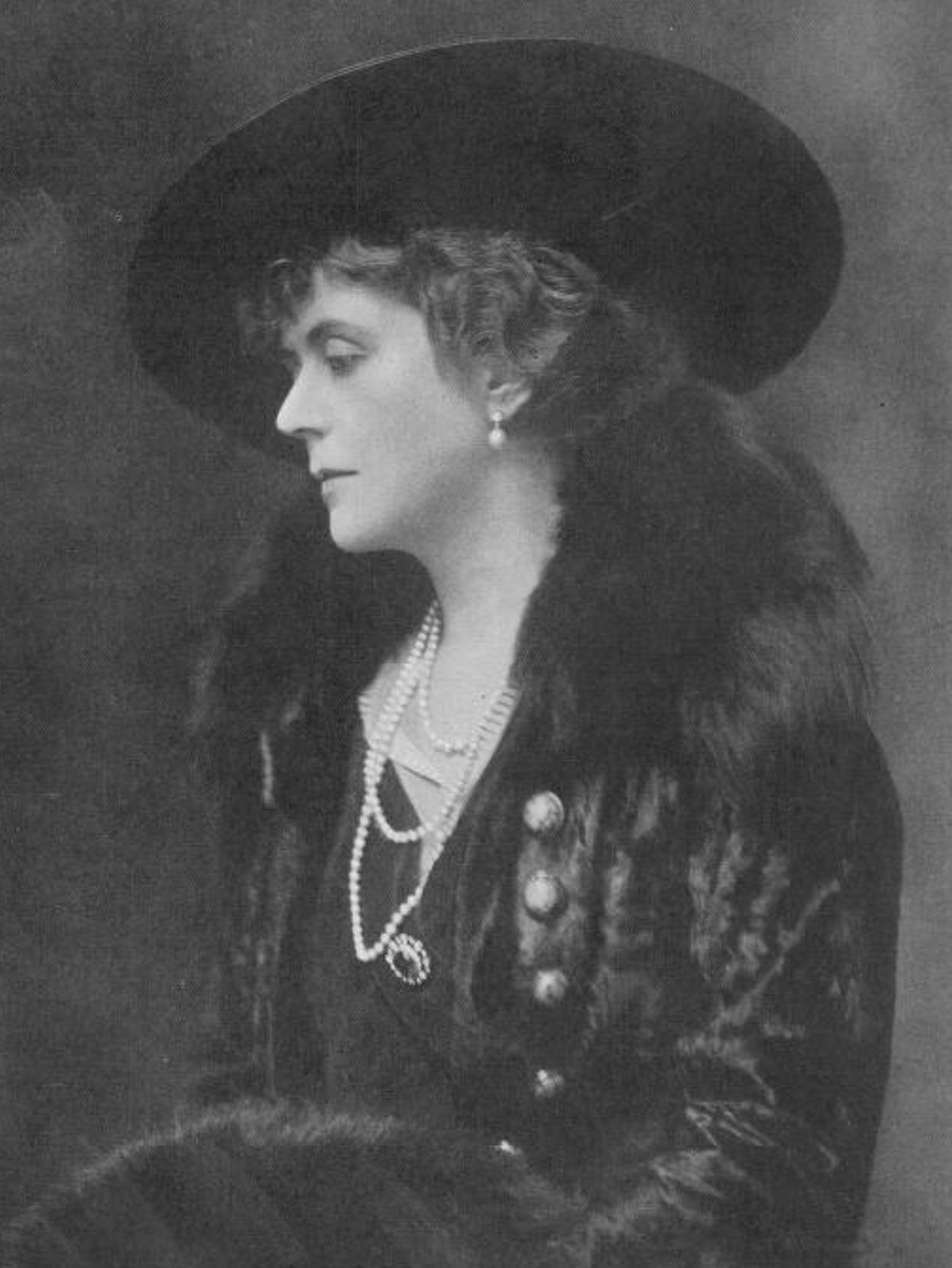
Lady Olive Grace Greville

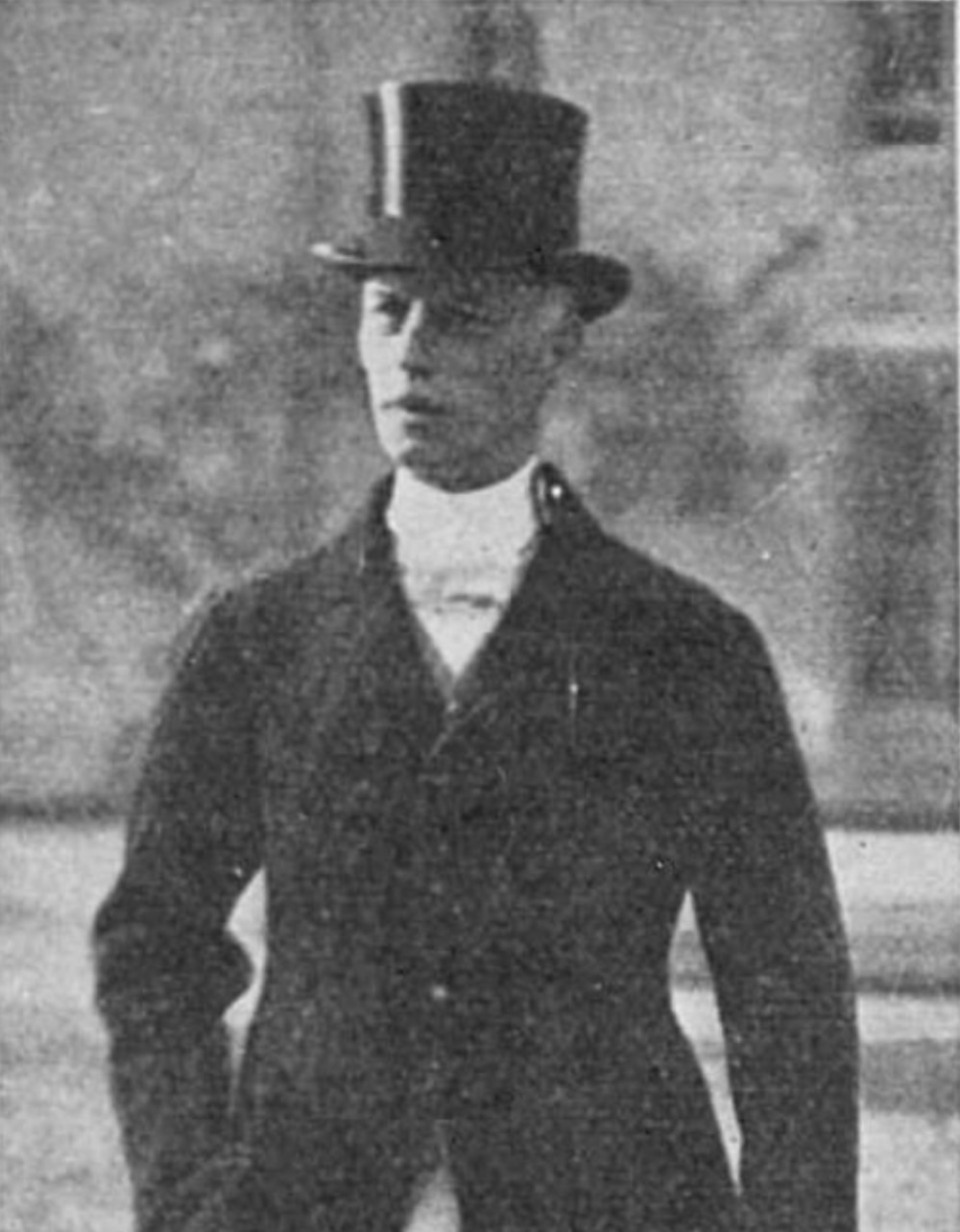
Lord Charles Greville

After Georgiana died her son Captain Frederic Arthur Bertie (1837-1885) and his wife Rose moved into the house. He had joined the army and was part of the Bengal Staff Corps. In 1873 he married Rose Emily daughter of John Pratt de Montmorency of Castle Morres in Ireland. The couple had three daughters and one son. Frederic died in 1885 but Rose and the children continued to live at the Manor. Unfortunately, Richard their only son died in the War in 1917. There is a plaque in St Mary’s Church, Weston-on-the-Green which is in his honour. In the following year Rose sold the house and it was bought by David Margesson, 1st Viscount Margesson David Margession (1890-1965) was a politician. In his youth he decided to live in the USA where he met his wife Frances Howard Leggett. The couple married in 1916 and two years later they moved to Weston Manor where they lived for the next four years. In 1922 he sold the house to Charles Greville, 3rd Baron Greville.

Charles Beresford Fulke Greville, 3rd Baron Greville (1871-1952) was a British soldier and aristocrat. He was A.D.C. to the Governor of Bombay (Lord Northcote). 1900-03, and Private Secretary to the Governor-General of Australia (Lord Northcote) in 1904. In 1909 he married Olive Kerr (nee Grace) who was the widow of Henry Kerr a wealthy American. The couple had one son. The Grevilles lived there until 1934 and then advertised the house for sale. It was bought by Stuart James Bevan.

Stuart James Bevan (1872-1935) was a British barrister and Conservative politician. His first wife Sylvia died in 1932 and two years later he married Clair Marguerite Jacobson (1885-1984). In 1935 he died and in the following year the house was sold by Clair. Both of them are buried in St Mary’s Churchyard.

By about 1946 Weston Manor was a hotel and still serves this function today.
