= Thrupp, Oxfordshire =

Hamlet in Oxfordshire, England

Coordinates: 51.839°N 1.303°W

Thrupp
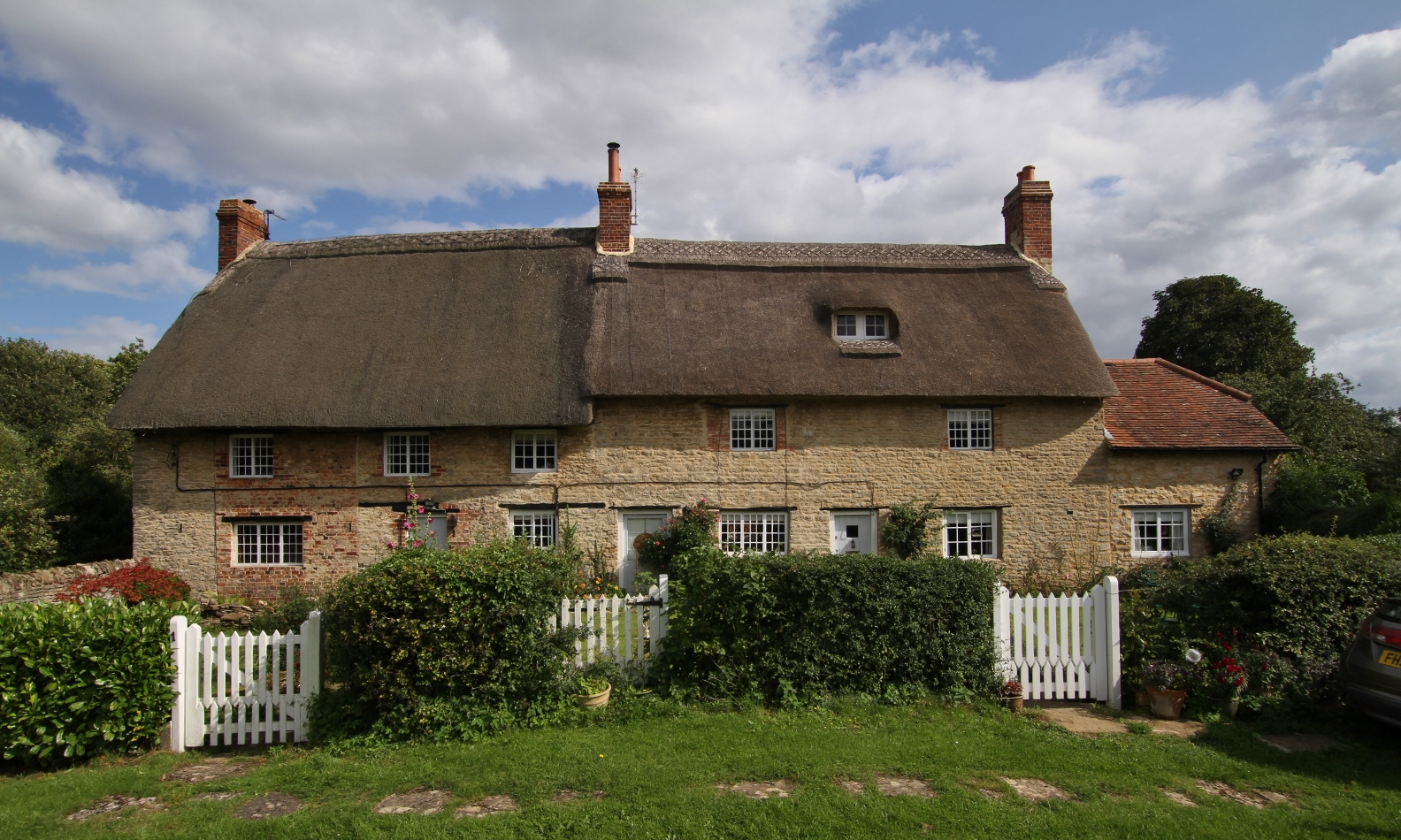
- Thrupp Yard Cottages

- Location within Oxfordshire
- OS grid reference: SP4815
- Civil parish: Shipton-on-Cherwell and Thrupp
- District: Cherwell
- Shire county: Oxfordshire
- Region: South East
- Country: England
- Sovereign state: United Kingdom
- Post town: Kidlington
- Postcode district: OX5
- Dialling code: 01865
- Police: Thames Valley
- Fire: Oxfordshire
- Ambulance: South Central
- UK Parliament: Banbury

Thrupp is a hamlet in the civil parish of Shipton-on-Cherwell and Thrupp, in the Cherwell district, in the county of Oxfordshire, England. It is beside the Oxford Canal and close to the River Cherwell, just north of Kidlington.

== History ==
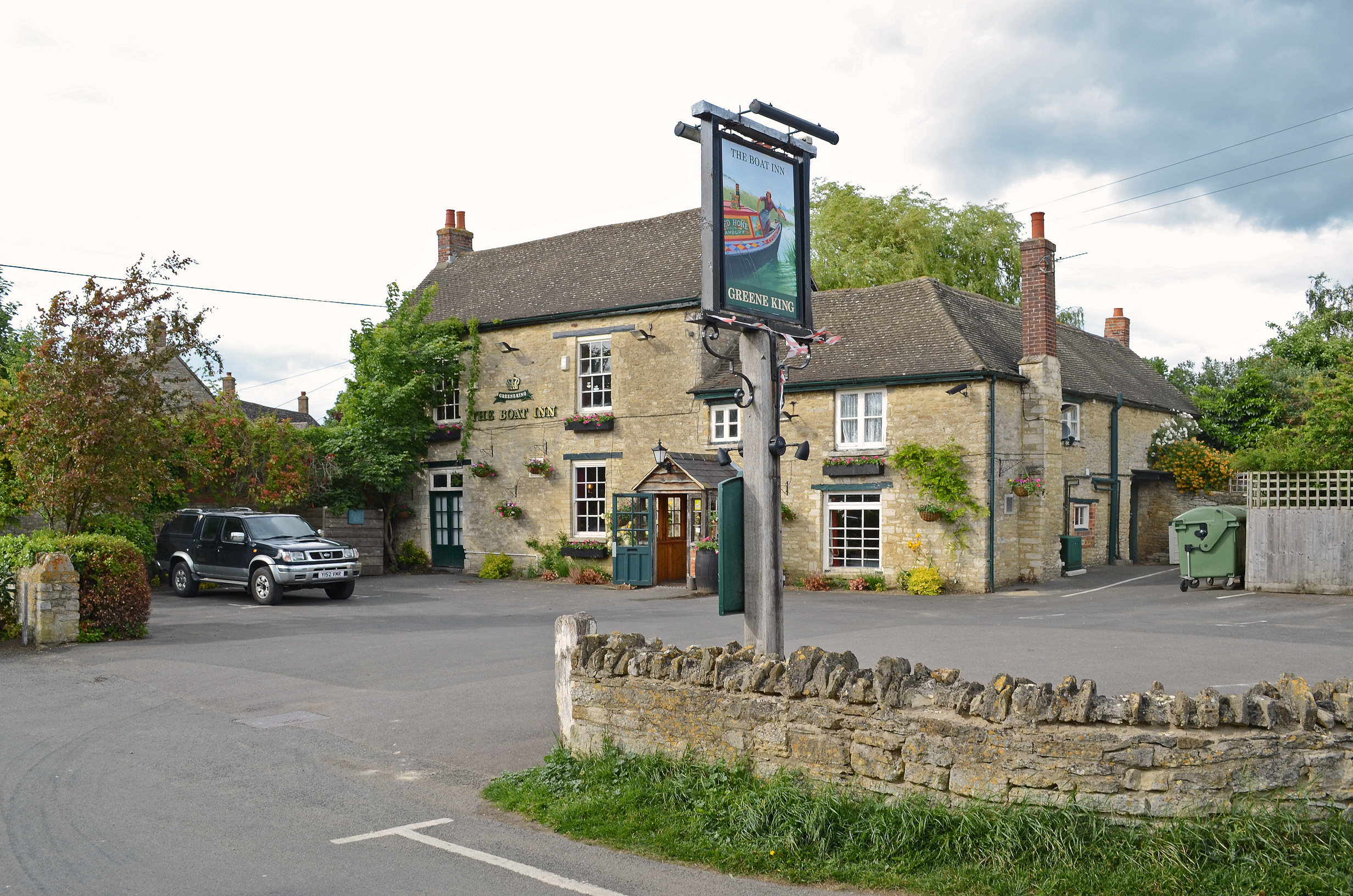
The Boat Inn previously known as the Axe

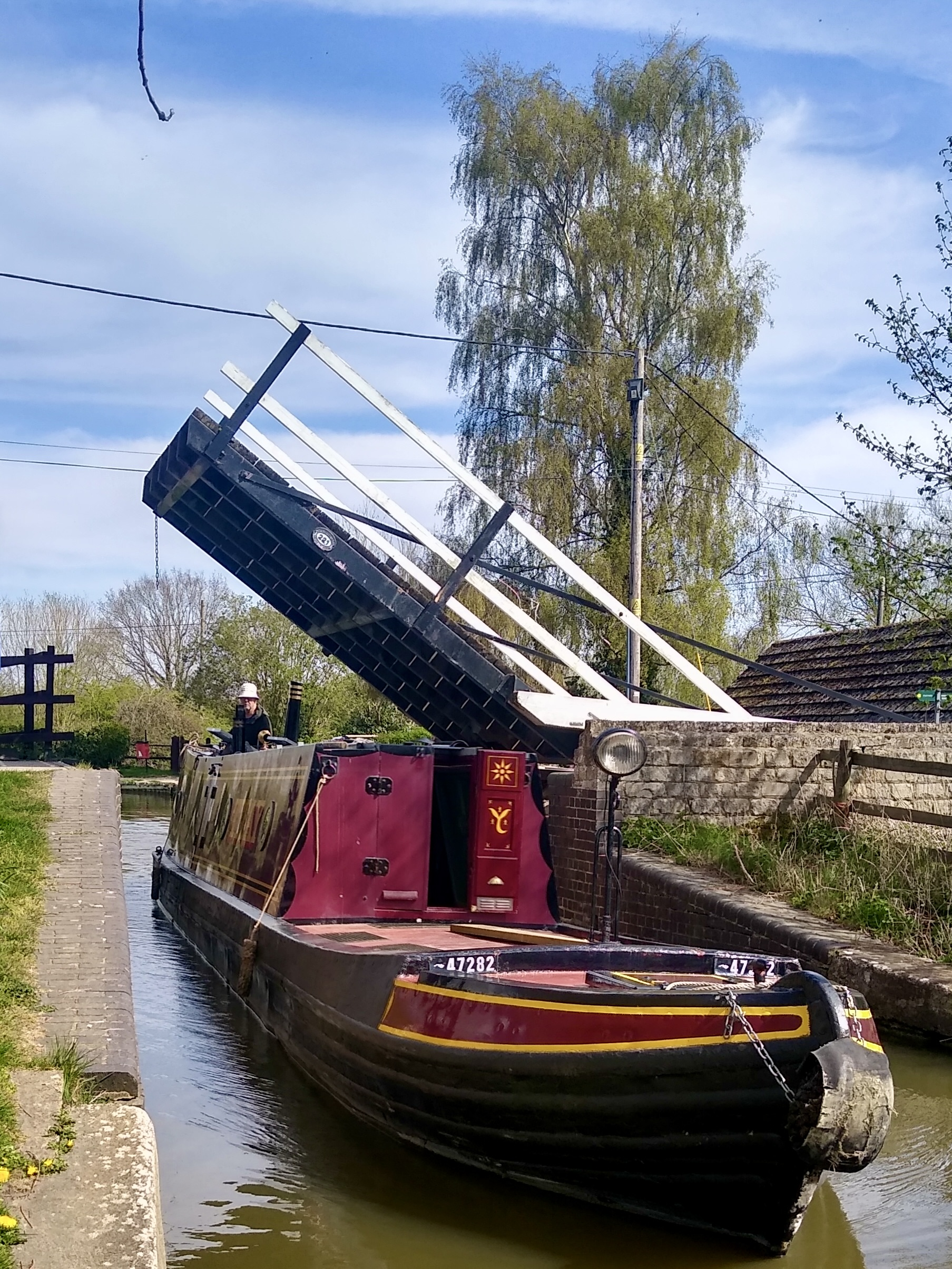
Aubreys Lift Bridge (Oxford Canal Bridge 221) at Thrupp

Before the Norman conquest of England in 1066 Stigand, Archbishop of Canterbury held the manor of Thrupp. In 1070 Stigand was deposed and William the Conqueror confiscated his lands. The name Thrupp is derived from an Old English word meaning farm or village. William granted Thrupp to Roger d'Ivry, who sold it to Wadard, a knight in William's court. In 1086 Thrupp was such a small settlement that the Domesday Book did not record it as having any tenants. Thrupp has the remains of a 15th century cross carved from local Jurassic limestone. The cross itself has been lost, but the base and rather weathered shaft survive. The present Manor Farm buildings date from the early part of the 17th century. As well as the farmhouse there are a granary and dovecote from the same period. The farm used to have a watermill powered by the River Cherwell.

In 1788 the Oxford Canal was extended southwards from Northbrook Lock just north of Tackley towards Kidlington and Oxford. It roughly parallels the River Cherwell until Thrupp, where it turns away from the river in a right-angle around Manor Farm to approach Oxford along the valley of the River Thames rather than that of the Cherwell. The canal company bought the manorial watermill, demolished most of it, and built a row of cottages beside the canal in its place. They used to be called Salt Row, and one historian suggests that they served as salt warehouses. In the 18th century Thrupp had two public houses: the Axe which is now the Boat Inn, and the Three Horseshoes which closed in 1924. In the 20th century the Britannia opened on the main Banbury Road. It has since been renamed the Jolly Boatman. Both the Boat Inn and the Jolly Boatman are now controlled by Greene King Brewery.

Thrupp has no Church of England parish church of its own. In 1876 Woodstock Baptist Church converted a house in Thrupp into a chapel. In 1953 the Baptists built a new church in nearby Kidlington, and in 1954 Thrupp chapel was consequently closed and sold. It has since been converted back into a house, but retains the external appearance of a chapel that it acquired in 1876. The 15th century cross, which may have originally stood on the main Banbury Road, now stands in front of the former chapel. At the end of the road through Thrupp is a lift bridge across the canal. On the other side is a yard with three cottages with a common thatched roof. In 1989 ITV Television filmed scenes for the Inspector Morse drama series episode The Last Enemy near the canal and the Boat Inn.

Thrupp was formerly a hamlet in the parish of Kidlington, in 1866 Thrupp became a separate civil parish, on 1 April 1955 the parish was abolished and merged with Shipton on Cherwell to form "Shipton on Cherwell and Thrupp". In 1951 the parish had a population of 154.

== Sources ==
- Cherwell District Council (August 2007). Hampton Gay, Shipton-on-Cherwell and Thrupp Conservation Area Appraisal. Bodicote: Cherwell District Council. pp. 24–26.
- Compton, Hugh J. (1976). The Oxford Canal. Newton Abbot: David & Charles. ISBN 0-7153-7238-6.
- Crossley, Alan; Elrington, C.R., eds. (1990). "Kidlington: Protestant nonconformity". A History of the County of Oxford. Victoria County History. Vol. 12: Wootton Hundred (South) including Woodstock. pp. 210–211. ISBN 978-0-19-722774-9.
- Richards, J. (1971). Thrupp, a study of the "isolated beauty" of the industrial revolution.
