= Cherwell District Council elections =

Local government elections in Oxfordshire, England

One third of Cherwell District Council in Oxfordshire, England is elected each year, followed by one year without election. Since the last comprehensive boundary changes in 2016, 48 councillors have been elected from 16 wards.

== Council elections ==
Composition of the council
Year	Conservative	Labour	Liberal Democrats (Note: Includes totals for the predecessors of the Liberal Democrats, the Liberal Party and SDP (both of which participated in the Alliance).)	Reform	Green (Note: Includes totals for the predecessors of the Green Party of England and Wales, the Ecology Party and Green Party UK.)	Independents & Others	Council control after election
Local government reorganisation; council established (45 seats)
1973	16	16	0	–	–	13	No overall control
1976	26	10	0	–	0	9	Conservative
New ward boundaries (52 seats)
1979	34	12	2	–	0	4	Conservative
1980	31	16	2	–	0	3	Conservative
1982	30	15	4	–	0	3	Conservative
1983	32	16	3	–	0	1	Conservative
1984	35	12	4	–	0	1	Conservative
1986	32	13	6	–	0	1	Conservative
1987	33	12	7	–	0	0	Conservative
1988	32	14	2	–	0	4	Conservative
1990	32	17	2	–	0	1	Conservative
1991	28	18	3	–	0	3	Conservative
1992	32	15	3	–	0	2	Conservative
1994	31	16	4	–	0	1	Conservative
1995	23	22	7	–	0	0	No overall control
1996	16	28	8	–	0	0	Labour
1998	17	24	7	–	0	4	No overall control
1999	26	19	5	–	0	2	No overall control
2000	33	13	4	–	0	2	Conservative
New ward boundaries (52 seats)
2002	37	11	2	–	0	0	Conservative
2003	34	12	4	–	0	0	Conservative
2004	36	10	4	–	0	0	Conservative
2006	38	8	4	–	0	0	Conservative
2007	42	4	4	–	0	0	Conservative
2008	44	2	4	–	0	0	Conservative
2010	44	2	4	–	0	0	Conservative
2011	43	4	3	–	0	0	Conservative
2012	41	6	3	–	0	0	Conservative
2014	40	7	2	–	0	1	Conservative
2015	41	7	1	–	0	1	Conservative
New ward boundaries (48 seats)
2016	38	8	0	–	0	2	Conservative
2018	37	9	1	–	0	1	Conservative
2019	32	9	3	–	1	3	Conservative
2021	32	9	3	0	1	3	Conservative
2022	25	10	7	0	2	4	Conservative
2023	20	12	10	0	3	3	No overall control
2024	11	13	17	0	4	3	No overall control
2026	8	8	21	6	4	1	No overall control

== Results maps ==
2002 results map

2003 results map

2004 results map

2006 results map

2007 results map

2008 results map

2010 results map

2011 results map

2012 results map

2014 results map

2015 results map

2016 results map

2018 results map

2019 results map

2021 results map

2022 results map

2023 results map

2024 results map

2026 results map

== By-election results ==
=== 1994-1998 ===
Gosford and Watereaton By-Election 28 November 1996
Party	Candidate	Votes	%	±%
Liberal Democrats		170	32.0	
Conservative		169	31.8	
Independent		100	18.8	
Labour		91	17.1	
Majority		1	0.2	
Turnout		530	50.0	
Liberal Democrats gain from Conservative		Swing		

Kidlington South East By-Election 22 January 1998
Party	Candidate	Votes	%	±%
Conservative	Maurice Billington	455	38.4	−1.1
Labour	John Stansby	450	38.0	−7.8
Liberal Democrats	John Wyse	280	23.6	+8.9
Majority		5	0.4	
Turnout		1,185	27.3	
Conservative gain from Labour		Swing		

=== 1998-2002 ===
Hardwick By-Election 23 July 1998
Party	Candidate	Votes	%	±%
Conservative		382	51.9	+24.3
Labour		306	41.6	−22.0
Liberal Democrats		48	6.5	−2.4
Majority		76	10.3	
Turnout		736		
Conservative gain from Labour		Swing		

Heyford By-Election 17 September 1998
Party	Candidate	Votes	%	±%
Liberal Democrats		290	36.3	−24.2
Independent		263	32.8	+32.8
Conservative		247	30.9	−8.6
Majority		27	3.5	
Turnout		800	47.0	
Liberal Democrats hold		Swing		

Calthorpe By-Election 27 September 2001
Party	Candidate	Votes	%	±%
Conservative		422	58.4	−2.1
Labour		183	25.3	−1.6
Liberal Democrats		117	16.2	+3.5
Majority		239	33.1	
Turnout		722	14.0	
Conservative hold		Swing		

=== 2002-2006 ===
Yarnton, Gorsford and Water Eaton By-Election 17 March 2005
Party	Candidate	Votes	%	±%
Conservative	Michael Gibbard	784	59.8	+12.6
Liberal Democrats	Suzanne Wilson-Higgins	423	32.3	−11.1
Labour	Catherine Arakelian	103	7.9	−1.5
Majority		361	27.5	
Turnout		1,310	31.0	
Conservative gain from Liberal Democrats		Swing		

=== 2006-2010 ===
Kirtlington By-Election 31 July 2008
Party	Candidate	Votes	%	±%
Conservative	Simon Holland	unopposed		
Conservative hold		Swing		

Kidlington North By-Election 4 June 2009
Party	Candidate	Votes	%	±%
Liberal Democrats	Douglas Williamson	828	49.2	−1.0
Conservative	Trevor Elford	690	41.0	+2.2
Labour	Andrew Hornsby-Smith	165	9.8	−1.2
Majority		138	8.2	
Turnout		1,683	40.7	
Liberal Democrats hold		Swing		

=== 2010-2014 ===
Kidlington North By-Election 22 July 2010
Party	Candidate	Votes	%	±%
Liberal Democrats	Alaric Rose	526	42.2	−11.4
Conservative	Eddie Stevens	419	33.6	−12.8
Labour	Catherine Arakelian	216	17.3	+17.3
UKIP	David Fairweather	86	6.9	+6.9
Majority		107	8.6	
Turnout		1,247		
Liberal Democrats hold		Swing		

Bicester North By-Election 29 September 2011
Party	Candidate	Votes	%	±%
Conservative	Melanie Magee	443	65.9	+7.0
Labour	Kevin Walsh	130	19.3	−5.8
Liberal Democrats	John Innes	99	14.7	−1.3
Majority		313	46.6	
Turnout		672		
Conservative hold		Swing		

Banbury Ruscote By-Election 15 November 2012
Party	Candidate	Votes	%	±%
Labour	Gordon Ross	611	56.7	−4.8
Conservative	Pat Tompson	349	32.4	+0.3
UKIP	David Burton	117	10.9	+10.9
Majority		262	24.3	
Turnout		1,077		
Labour hold		Swing		

Hook Norton By-Election 2 May 2013
Party	Candidate	Votes	%	±%
Conservative	Ray Jelf	511	66.6	+8.1
Labour	Perran Moon	155	20.2	−11.1
Green	Colin Clark	101	13.2	+13.2
Majority		356	46.4	
Turnout		767		
Conservative hold		Swing		

Banbury Ruscote By-Election 26 September 2013
Party	Candidate	Votes	%	±%
Labour	Mark Cherry	758	58.9	−2.6
Conservative	Pat Tompson	323	25.1	−7.0
UKIP	Christian Miller	206	16.0	+16.0
Majority		435	33.8	
Turnout		1,287		
Labour hold		Swing		

=== 2014-2018 ===
Banbury Grimsbury and Castle By-Election 1 October 2015
Party	Candidate	Votes	%	±%
Labour	Shaida Hussain	781	45.0	+8.3
Conservative	Tony Mepham	661	38.1	+3.1
UKIP	Linda Wren	150	8.6	−6.3
Liberal Democrats	Kenneth Ashworth	73	4.2	−1.3
Green	Christopher Manley	72	4.1	−3.8
Majority		120	6.9	
Turnout		1,737		
Labour gain from Conservative		Swing		

Adderbury, Bloxham and Bodicote By-Election 22 September 2016
Party	Candidate	Votes	%	±%
Conservative	Andrew McHugh	1,015	57.4	+8.5
Labour	Sue Christie	286	16.2	−0.2
Green	Naomi Kanetsuka	278	15.7	−5.5
Liberal Democrats	Ian Thomas	189	10.7	−2.8
Majority		729	41.2	
Turnout		1,768		
Conservative hold		Swing		

=== 2022-2026 ===
Banbury Cross and Neithrop By-Election 1 May 2025
Party	Candidate	Votes	%	±%
Conservative	Fiaz Ahmed	729	33.3	+9.0
Labour	Andrew Eaton	690	31.5	−16.9
Independent	Simon Garrett	412	18.8	+7.4
Liberal Democrats	Ian Thomas	358	16.4	+10.1
Majority		39	1.8	
Turnout		2,189		
Conservative gain from Labour		Swing		

Banbury Grimsbury and Hightown By-Election 1 May 2025
Party	Candidate	Votes	%	±%
Labour	Henry Elugwu	639	32.8	−11.9
Conservative	Paul Sargent	600	30.8	+10.3
Independent	Cassi Bellingham	289	14.8	+2.8
Liberal Democrats	Sophie Parker-Manuel	216	11.1	−2.4
Green	Karl Kwiatkowski	207	10.6	+1.3
Majority		39	2.0	
Turnout		1,951		
Labour hold		Swing		

Deddington By-Election 1 May 2025
Party	Candidate	Votes	%	±%
Conservative	Zoe McLernon	1,560	46.9	+3.1
Liberal Democrats	Nick Mylne	916	27.6	+15.0
Labour	Helen Oldfield	478	14.4	−18.8
Green	Aaron Bliss	370	11.1	+0.7
Majority		644	19.4	
Turnout		3,324		
Conservative hold		Swing		

=== 2026-2030 ===
Kidlington West By-Election 16 July 2026
Party	Candidate	Votes	%	±%
Liberal Democrats	Rob Packard	1,028	58.8	+13.7
Reform	Dave Panitlin	331	18.9	−4.3
Conservative	Chuk Okeke	232	13.3	−4.0
Green	Jenny Tamblyn	158	9.0	−5.4
Majority		697	39.9	
Turnout		1,749		
Liberal Democrats hold		Swing		
