= 2010 Cherwell District Council election =

2010 English local government election

Map of the 2010 Cherwell District Council election

The 2010 Cherwell District Council election took place on 6 May 2010 to elect a third of the members of Cherwell District Council, the council of Cherwell District in Oxfordshire, England. This was on the same day as the other local elections across England as well as the 2010 United Kingdom general election. The previous council election took place in 2008 and the following election was held in 2011. In the election, the council stayed under Conservative majority control, but there was no change in party numbers.

== Results ==
Party	Previous	Seats +/-	2010
Conservative	44	Steady	44
Liberal Democrat	4	Steady	4
Labour	2	Steady	2

== See also ==
- Cherwell District Council elections
