= Mark Petterson, Baron Petterson =

British Liberal Democrats politician

The Right Honourable The Lord Petterson

Member of the House of Lords
- Lord Temporal
- Life peerage 28 August 2026

Personal details
- Born: Mark Edward Petterson
- Party: Liberal Democrats
- Spouse: Vanessa (m. 1991)
- Children: 2
- Education: Imperial College London

Mark Edward Petterson, Baron Petterson is a British businessman and Liberal Democrat member of the House of Lords.

== Biography ==
Petterson was educated at Alleyne's School in Stevenage and at Imperial College London, where he graduated in mineral resources engineering in 1981.

In 2000 Petterson co-founded Warwick Energy, of which he is a director. The company developed the Barrow Offshore Wind Farm in the East Irish Sea and sold the project company to a joint venture of Centrica, DONG and Statkraft in 2003; construction of the 90 MW wind farm was completed in 2006.

Warwick Energy conceived the Thanet Offshore Wind Farm project off the coast of Kent in 2003, under the second round of UK offshore wind leasing. The project was sold in 2007 to Christofferson, Robb & Co, with Warwick Energy continuing to manage it until October 2008, and was acquired by Vattenfall in November 2008. When it was officially opened in September 2010, Thanet was the largest offshore wind farm in the world.

Warwick Energy also developed the Dudgeon Offshore Wind Farm off the north Norfolk coast. The project had received consent for up to 560 MW when Statoil and Statkraft acquired the project company in October 2012. The 402 MW wind farm was officially opened in 2017.

== Political career ==
Petterson has been a member of the Liberal Democrats for more than 25 years and was an informal adviser to the party for over a decade.

In both the 2023 Cherwell District Council election and the 2024 Cherwell District Council election, Petterson was the Liberal Democrat candidate for the Banbury Ruscote ward. In the 2025 Oxfordshire County Council election, he was again the Liberal Democrat candidate for the same ward.

In the July 2026 political peerages, it was announced that he would be made a life peer and sit in the House of Lords for the Liberal Democrats. He was created Baron Petterson on 28 August 2026. He was introduced to the House of Lords on 22 October 2026.

== Personal life ==
Petterson has supported youth homelessness charities, including Centrepoint, and has been a trustee of BYHP (formerly the Banbury Young Homelessness Project) since November 2016. He lives in Oxfordshire with his wife, Vanessa and their two daughters.

Former Leader of the Liberal Democrats Jo Swinson was criticised for taking donations from him after his involvement in fracking.
