= 2003 Cherwell District Council election =

2003 UK local government election

Results of the 2003 Cherwell District Council election

The 2003 Cherwell District Council election took place on 1 May 2003 to elect members of Cherwell District Council in Oxfordshire, England. One third of the council was up for election and the Conservative Party stayed in overall control of the council.

Before the election the Conservatives were expected to lose seats after a recent large council tax rise. The results saw the Conservatives keep a majority but suffer a net loss of 3 seats after losing 2 seats each to Labour and the Liberal Democrats. The Labour winners included John Hanna who won by 44 votes after losing in the 2002 election by 8 votes. However the Conservatives did gain a seat in Banbury Grimsbury & Castle from Labour for the first in over 20 years. Meanwhile, the National Front stood a candidate for the first time to Cherwell Council and said that they would stand in all of the Bicester wards in the next election in 2004.

After the election, the composition of the council was:

- Conservative 34
- Labour 12
- Liberal Democrat 4

== Election result ==
Cherwell local election result 2003
Party	Seats	Gains	Losses	Net gain/loss	Seats %	Votes %	Votes	+/−
Conservative	9	1	4	-3	56.3	47.7	9,457	-3.6%
Labour	4	2	1	+1	25.0	25.4	5,034	-6.3%
Liberal Democrats	3	2	0	+2	18.8	23.8	4,719	+7.8%
Independent	0	0	0	0	0	1.5	306	+1.1%
Green	0	0	0	0	0	0.8	155	+0.2%
National Front	0	0	0	0	0	0.7	142	+0.7%

== Ward results ==
Ambrosden & Chesterton
Party	Candidate	Votes	%	±%
Conservative	Andrew Fulljames	517	73.6	+8.7
Liberal Democrats	Ralph Rookwood	185	26.4	+1.5
Majority		332	47.2	+7.2
Turnout		702		
Conservative hold		Swing		

The Astons & Heyfords
Party	Candidate	Votes	%	±%
Liberal Democrats	Richard Makepeace	718	51.2	
Conservative	Terence Miall	684	48.8	
Majority		34	2.4	
Turnout		1,402		
Liberal Democrats gain from Conservative		Swing		

Banbury Easington
Party	Candidate	Votes	%	±%
Conservative	Nigel Morris	870	47.9	
Labour	David Bullock	340	18.7	
Independent	Gordon Gerry	306	16.8	
Liberal Democrats	Daphne Nash	223	12.3	
Green	Michael Cull-Dodd	79	4.3	
Majority		530	29.2	
Turnout		1,818		
Conservative hold		Swing		

Banbury Grimsbury & Castle
Party	Candidate	Votes	%	±%
Conservative	Stephen Back	704	50.7	
Labour	Gordon Ross	684	49.3	
Majority		20	1.4	
Turnout		1,388		
Conservative gain from Labour		Swing		

Banbury Hardwick
Party	Candidate	Votes	%	±%
Conservative	Nicholas Turner	504	60.4	
Labour	Andrew Coles	331	39.6	
Majority		173	20.8	
Turnout		835		
Conservative hold		Swing		

Banbury Ruscote
Party	Candidate	Votes	%	±%
Labour	Janet Justice	676	50.9	
Conservative	Keith Strangwood	652	49.1	
Majority		24	1.8	
Turnout		1,328		
Labour hold		Swing		

Bicester East
Party	Candidate	Votes	%	±%
Labour	John Hanna	542	46.6	
Conservative	Anthony Kempton	498	42.8	
Liberal Democrats	Olatunde Afilaka	124	10.7	
Majority		44	3.8	
Turnout		1,164		
Labour gain from Conservative		Swing		

Bicester North
Party	Candidate	Votes	%	±%
Conservative	Eamonn Gilmore	564	57.4	
Labour	Wendy Spencer	273	27.8	
Liberal Democrats	Stephen Creed	146	14.9	
Majority		291	29.6	
Turnout		983		
Conservative hold		Swing		

Bicester South
Party	Candidate	Votes	%	±%
Conservative	Rose Stratford	405	42.6	
Liberal Democrats	Nicholas Cotter	387	40.7	
Labour	Nicholas Cherry	159	16.7	
Majority		18	1.9	
Turnout		951		
Conservative hold		Swing		

Bicester Town
Party	Candidate	Votes	%	±%
Conservative	Diana Edwards	564	52.3	
Labour	John Broad	341	31.6	
Liberal Democrats	Neil Walton	173	16.0	
Majority		223	20.7	
Turnout		1,078		
Conservative hold		Swing		

Bicester West
Party	Candidate	Votes	%	±%
Labour	Leslie Sibley	774	43.3	
Conservative	Russell Hurle	690	38.6	
Liberal Democrats	Lorraine Read	181	10.1	
National Front	James Starkey	142	7.9	
Majority		84	4.7	
Turnout		1,787		
Labour gain from Conservative		Swing		

Cropredy
Party	Candidate	Votes	%	±%
Conservative	Rosemarie Higham	704	77.5	
Liberal Democrats	Peter Davis	204	22.5	
Majority		500	55.0	
Turnout		908		
Conservative hold		Swing		

Hook Norton
Party	Candidate	Votes	%	±%
Conservative	Derrick Gasson	597	77.6	
Liberal Democrats	Martin Squires	172	22.4	
Majority		425	55.2	
Turnout		769		
Conservative hold		Swing		

Kidlington North
Party	Candidate	Votes	%	±%
Liberal Democrats	John Wyse	786	54.6	
Conservative	Susan Goodgame	408	28.4	
Labour	Catharine Arakelian	245	17.0	
Majority		378	26.2	
Turnout		1,439		
Liberal Democrats hold		Swing		

Kidlington South
Party	Candidate	Votes	%	±%
Labour	John Stansby	669	37.6	
Liberal Democrats	Devena Rae	602	33.9	
Conservative	Barry Carter	507	28.5	
Majority		67	3.7	
Turnout		1,778		
Labour hold		Swing		

Yarnton, Gosford & Water Eaton
Party	Candidate	Votes	%	±%
Liberal Democrats	Paul Evans	818	55.2	
Conservative	Maurice Billington	589	39.7	
Green	Nicholas Goodwin	76	5.1	
Majority		229	15.5	
Turnout		1,483		
Liberal Democrats gain from Conservative		Swing		
