= 2024 Cherwell District Council election =

2024 English local election

- 2 May 2024

16 out of 48 seats to Cherwell District Council 25 seats needed for a majority

	First party	Second party	Third party
Leader	David Hingley	Sean Woodcock	Barry Wood
Party	Liberal Democrats	Labour	Conservative
Last election	10 seats, 25.2%	12 seats, 25.7%	20 seats, 34.0%
Seats before	10	12	20
Seats won	8	4	2
Seats after	17	13	11
Seat change	▲7	▲1	▼9
Popular vote	10,220	9,137	11,156
Percentage	28.3%	25.3%	30.9%
Swing	▲3.1%	▼0.4%	▼3.1%
	Fourth party	Fifth party
Leader	Ian Middleton	Les Sibley
Party	Green	Independent
Last election	3 seats, 11.1%	3 seats, 4.0%
Seats before	3	3
Seats won	1	1
Seats after	4	3
Seat change	▲1	Steady
Popular vote	3,659	1,905
Percentage	10.1%	5.3%
Swing	▼1.0%	▲1.3%
- Winner of each seat at the 2024 Cherwell District Council election
Leader before election
Barry Wood
Conservative
No overall control
Leader after election
David Hingley
Liberal Democrats
No overall control

The 2024 Cherwell District Council election took place on 2 May 2024 to elect members of Cherwell District Council in Oxfordshire, England. This was on the same day as other local elections.

== Summary ==
The council was under no overall control prior to the election, being run by a Conservative minority administration. The council remained under no overall control after the election, but the Conservatives fell back from being the largest party to being only the third largest party on the council, with the Liberal Democrats being the largest party, followed by Labour.

Following the election a minority administration comprising the Liberal Democrats and Green Party plus one of the independents formed to run the council. The Liberal Democrat group leader, David Hingley, was formally appointed as leader of the council at the subsequent annual council meeting on 22 May 2024.

=== Election result ===
Cherwell District Council's composition following the 2024 local elections

2024 Cherwell District Council election
Party	This election			Full council			This election		
Party	Seats	Net	Seats %	Other	Total	Total %	Votes	Votes %	+/−
Liberal Democrats	8	▲7	50.0	9	17	35.4	10,220	28.3	+3.1
Labour	4	▲1	25.0	9	13	27.1	9,137	25.3	–0.4
Conservative	2	▼9	12.5	9	11	22.9	11,156	30.9	–3.1
Green	1	▲1	6.3	3	4	8.3	3,659	10.1	–1.0
Independent	1	Steady	6.3	2	3	6.3	1,905	5.3	+1.3

== Ward results ==
The Statement of Persons Nominated, which details the candidates standing in each ward, was released by Cherwell District Council following the close of nominations on 5 April 2024.

=== Adderbury, Bloxham & Bodicote ===
Adderbury, Bloxham & Bodicote
Party	Candidate	Votes	%	±%
Liberal Democrats	Gordon Blakeway	1,100	40.9	−12.7
Conservative	Adam Nell*	908	33.7	+1.9
Labour	Helen Oldfield	488	18.1	+6.1
Green	Linda Newbery	195	7.2	N/A
Majority		192	7.2	
Turnout		2,691	34.7	
Registered electors		7,792		
Liberal Democrats gain from Conservative		Swing		

=== Banbury Calthorpe & Easington ===
Banbury Calthorpe & Easington
Party	Candidate	Votes	%	±%
Conservative	Kieron Mallon*	1,141	39.9	+3.0
Labour Co-op	Anne Cullen	1,120	39.2	−3.4
Green	Liz Reed	216	7.6	+0.2
Independent	John Brown	200	7.0	+2.4
Liberal Democrats	Stephen Buckwell	182	6.4	−1.7
Majority		21	0.7	
Turnout		2,859	32.68	
Registered electors		8,826		
Conservative hold		Swing		

=== Banbury Cross & Neithrop ===
Banbury Cross & Neithrop
Party	Candidate	Votes	%	±%
Labour Co-op	Matt Hodgson*	936	48.4	−6.2
Conservative	Fiaz Ahmed	469	24.3	+1.5
Independent	Simon Garrett	220	11.4	+7.3
Green	Alison Nuttall	187	9.7	+1.5
Liberal Democrats	Andrew Raisbeck	121	6.3	−0.9
Majority		467	24.1	
Turnout		1,933	25.82	
Registered electors		7,537		
Labour Co-op hold		Swing		

=== Banbury Grimsbury & Hightown ===
Banbury Grimsbury & Hightown
Party	Candidate	Votes	%	±%
Labour	Dom Vaitkus	842	44.7	−10.9
Conservative	Tahir Mahmood	387	20.5	−0.5
Liberal Democrats	Sophie Parker-Manuel	254	13.5	+5.8
Independent	Cassi Bellingham	227	12.0	+5.8
Green	Karl Kwiatkowski	175	9.3	−0.2
Majority		455	24.2	
Turnout		1,885	26.4	
Registered electors		7,217		
Labour hold		Swing		

=== Banbury Hardwick ===
Banbury Hardwick
Party	Candidate	Votes	%	±%
Labour	Kerrie Thornhill	870	50.2	+4.1
Conservative	Adrian Dongo Munoz	561	32.4	−7.8
Green	Carol Broom	196	11.3	−1.9
Liberal Democrats	Christophe Aramini	106	6.1	N/A
Majority		309	17.8	+11.9
Turnout		1,733	22.79	−0.45
Registered electors		7,711		
Labour gain from Conservative		Swing		

=== Banbury Ruscote ===
Banbury Ruscote
Party	Candidate	Votes	%	±%
Labour Co-op	Mark Cherry*	868	58.6	+0.1
Conservative	Taraji Ogunnubi	302	20.4	−5.3
Independent	Julie Battison	137	9.2	+4.6
Green	Julie Middleton	95	6.4	+0.1
Liberal Democrats	Mark Petterson	80	5.4	+0.5
Majority		566	38.2	
Turnout		1,482	20.57	
Registered electors		7,272		
Labour Co-op hold		Swing		

=== Bicester East ===
Bicester East
Party	Candidate	Votes	%	±%
Liberal Democrats	Rob Parkinson	746	39.1	N/A
Conservative	Sandy Dallimore*	577	30.3	−7.6
Labour	Jane Clements	355	18.6	−1.9
Green	Damien Maguire	228	12.0	−29.6
Majority		169	8.8	
Turnout		1,906	30.08	
Registered electors		6,394		
Liberal Democrats gain from Conservative		Swing		

=== Bicester North & Caversfield ===
Bicester North & Caversfield
Party	Candidate	Votes	%	±%
Liberal Democrats	John Willett	710	37.5	−2.1
Conservative	Lynn Pratt*	614	32.4	−1.3
Labour	Arjun Bais	416	22.0	−4.7
Green	Victoria Campbell	155	8.2	N/A
Majority		96	5.1	
Turnout		1,895	28.61	
Registered electors		6,669		
Liberal Democrats gain from Conservative		Swing		

=== Bicester South & Ambrosden ===
Bicester South & Ambrosden
Party	Candidate	Votes	%	±%
Liberal Democrats	Frank Ideh	1,250	49.5	−7.3
Conservative	Sammy Omotayo	647	25.6	−2.1
Labour	Sian Tohill-Martin	406	16.1	+0.6
Green	Bryony Core	222	8.8	N/A
Majority		603	23.9	
Turnout		2,525	24.48	
Registered electors		10,380		
Liberal Democrats gain from Conservative		Swing		

=== Bicester West ===
Bicester West
Party	Candidate	Votes	%	±%
Independent	Les Sibley*	1,121	59.0	+19.0
Labour	Naomi Karslake	298	15.7	−4.7
Conservative	Jake Whittingham	241	12.7	−11.6
Liberal Democrats	Peter Jackson	171	9.0	−0.7
Green	Trevor Campbell	68	3.6	−2.1
Majority		823	43.3	
Turnout		1,899	29.00	
Registered electors		6,583		
Independent hold		Swing		

=== Cropredy, Sibfords & Wroxton ===
Cropredy, Sibfords & Wroxton
Party	Candidate	Votes	%	±%
Liberal Democrats	Chris Brant	1,310	47.6	+16.8
Conservative	George Reynolds*	1,056	38.3	−6.6
Labour	Kim Harman	388	14.1	−1.7
Majority		254	9.3	
Turnout		2,754	39.92	
Registered electors		6,962		
Liberal Democrats gain from Conservative		Swing		

=== Deddington ===
Deddington
Party	Candidate	Votes	%	±%
Conservative	David Rogers	1,244	43.8	±0.0
Labour	Annette Murphy	941	33.2	+6.0
Liberal Democrats	James Hartley	357	12.6	−6.1
Green	Aaron Bliss	296	10.4	+0.1
Majority		303	10.6	
Turnout		2,838	38.16	
Registered electors		7,519		
Conservative hold		Swing		

=== Fringford & Heyfords ===
Fringford & Heyfords
Party	Candidate	Votes	%	±%
Liberal Democrats	Grace Conway-Murray	1,169	44.6	+13.5
Conservative	Simon Holland	949	36.2	−6.0
Labour	Russ Hewer	257	9.8	−5.2
Green	Jenny Tamblyn	245	9.4	−2.3
Majority		220	8.4	
Turnout		2,620	35.67	
Registered electors		7,402		
Liberal Democrats gain from Conservative		Swing		

=== Kidlington East ===
Kidlington East
Party	Candidate	Votes	%	±%
Green	Linda Ward	1,010	43.7	−13.3
Conservative	Emma Nell	541	23.4	−2.3
Liberal Democrats	Mel Moorhouse	396	17.1	N/A
Labour	Gary Warland	365	15.8	+5.4
Majority		469	20.3	
Turnout		2,312	32.90	
Registered electors		7,100		
Green gain from Conservative		Swing		

=== Kidlington West ===
Kidlington West
Party	Candidate	Votes	%	±%
Liberal Democrats	Dorothy Walker*	1,224	53.1	−3.1
Conservative	Zoe McLernon	575	25.0	−7.0
Labour	Barry Richards	281	12.2	+0.4
Green	Amanda Maguire	224	9.7	N/A
Majority		649	28.1	
Turnout		2,304	32.82	
Registered electors		7,091		
Liberal Democrats hold		Swing		

=== Launton & Otmoor ===
Launton & Otmoor
Party	Candidate	Votes	%	±%
Liberal Democrats	Alisa Russell	1,044	42.8	−2.2
Conservative	David Hughes	944	38.7	−3.6
Labour	James Daulton	306	12.5	−0.2
Green	Fin MacEwan	147	6.0	N/A
Majority		100	4.1	
Turnout		2,441	37.64	
Registered electors		6,557		
Liberal Democrats gain from Conservative		Swing		

== By-elections ==
=== Banbury Cross & Neithrop ===
Banbury Cross & Neithrop by-election: 1 May 2025
Party	Candidate	Votes	%	±%
Conservative	Fiaz Ahmed	729	33.3	+9.0
Labour	Andrew Eaton	690	31.5	–16.9
Independent	Simon Garrett	412	18.8	+7.4
Liberal Democrats	Rebecca Bell	358	16.4	+10.1
Majority		39	1.8	N/A
Turnout		2,189	29.4	+3.6
Registered electors		7,639		
Conservative gain from Labour		Swing	▲13.0	

=== Banbury Grimsbury & Hightown ===
Banbury Grimsbury & Hightown by-election: 1 May 2025
Party	Candidate	Votes	%	±%
Labour	Henry Elugwu	639	32.8	–11.9
Conservative	Paul Sargent	600	30.8	+10.3
Independent	Cassi Bellingham	289	14.8	+2.8
Liberal Democrats	Sophie Parker-Manuel	216	11.1	–2.4
Green	Karl Kwiatkowski	207	10.6	+1.3
Majority		39	2.0	–22.2
Turnout		1,951	27.6	+1.2
Registered electors		7,207		
Labour hold		Swing	▼11.1	

=== Deddington ===
Deddington by-election: 1 May 2025
Party	Candidate	Votes	%	±%
Conservative	Zoe McLernon	1,560	46.9	+3.1
Liberal Democrats	Nick Mylne	916	27.6	+15.0
Labour	Helen Oldfield	478	14.4	–18.8
Green	Aaron Bliss	370	11.1	+0.7
Majority		644	19.3	+8.7
Turnout		3,324	44.3	+6.1
Registered electors		7,673		
Conservative hold		Swing	▼6.0	
