= 1999 Cherwell District Council election =

1999 UK local government election

The 1999 Cherwell District Council election took place on 6 May 1999 to elect members of Cherwell District Council in Oxfordshire, England. One third of the council was up for election and the council stayed under no overall control.

The result saw the Conservative party make gains from both Labour and the Liberal Democrats to become the largest party on the council.

After the election, the composition of the council was

- Conservative 26
- Labour 19
- Liberal Democrat 5
- Independent 2

== Election result ==
Cherwell local election result 1999
Party	Seats	Gains	Losses	Net gain/loss	Seats %	Votes %	Votes	+/−
Conservative	10			+7	55.6			
Labour	6			-4	33.3			
Liberal Democrats	1			-3	5.6			
Independent	1			0	5.6			
