= 2019 Cherwell District Council election =

2019 UK local government election

Results of the 2019 Cherwell District Council election

The 2019 Cherwell District Council election was held on 2 May 2019 to elect members of Cherwell District Council in England. This was on the same day as other local elections.

== Results summary ==
2019 Cherwell District Council election
| Party | This election | | | | Full council | | | This election | | |
| Party | Candidates | Seats | Net | Seats % | Other | Total | Total % | Votes | Votes % | +/− |
|---|---|---|---|---|---|---|---|---|---|---|
| Conservative | {{{candidates}}} | 9 | ▼5 | 52.9 | 23 | 32 | 66.7 | 15,783 | 42.5 | |
| Labour | {{{candidates}}} | 3 | Steady | 17.6 | 6 | 9 | 18.8 | 7,854 | 21.1 | |
| Liberal Democrats | {{{candidates}}} | 2 | ▲2 | 11.8 | 1 | 3 | 6.3 | 6,365 | 17.1 | |
| Independent | {{{candidates}}} | 2 | ▲2 | 11.8 | 1 | 3 | 6.3 | 2,544 | 6.8 | |
| Green | {{{candidates}}} | 1 | ▲1 | 5.9 | 0 | 1 | 2.1 | 3,984 | 10.7 | |
| UKIP | {{{candidates}}} | 0 | Steady | 0.0 | 0 | 0 | 0.0 | 626 | 1.7 | |

== Ward results ==
=== Adderbury, Bloxham & Bodicote ===
Adderbury, Bloxham & Bodicote
| Party | Candidate | Votes | % | ±% |
|---|---|---|---|---|
| Conservative | Mike Bishop | 1,189 | 52.2 | |
| Green | Andy Aris | 416 | 18.3 | |
| Labour Co-op | Suzette Watson | 377 | 16.5 | |
| Liberal Democrats | Jonathan Gregory | 296 | 13.0 | |
| Majority | | 773 | 33.9 | |
| Turnout | | 2,318 | 32.8 | |
| Conservative hold | | Swing | | |

=== Banbury Calthorpe & Easington ===
Banbury Calthorpe & Easington
| Party | Candidate | Votes | % | ±% |
|---|---|---|---|---|
| Conservative | Colin Clarke | 1,218 | 53.2 | |
| Labour Co-op | Phil Richards | 590 | 25.8 | |
| Liberal Democrats | Brent Jackson | 480 | 21.0 | |
| Majority | | 628 | 27.4 | |
| Turnout | | 2,365 | 30.7 | |
| Conservative hold | | Swing | | |

=== Banbury Cross & Neithrop ===
Banbury Cross & Neithrop
| Party | Candidate | Votes | % | ±% |
|---|---|---|---|---|
| Labour | Hannah Banfield | 1,031 | 48.5 | |
| Conservative | Alastair Milenhome | 789 | 37.1 | |
| Liberal Democrats | John Whitwell | 306 | 14.4 | |
| Majority | | 242 | 11.4 | |
| Turnout | | 2,187 | 31.7 | |
| Labour hold | | Swing | | |

=== Banbury Grimsbury & Hightown ===
Banbury Grimsbury & Hightown
| Party | Candidate | Votes | % | ±% |
|---|---|---|---|---|
| Labour Co-op | Perran Moon | 957 | 49.2 | |
| Conservative | David Beverly | 586 | 30.1 | |
| Green | Carrick Cameron | 403 | 20.7 | |
| Majority | | 371 | 19.1 | |
| Turnout | | 1,990 | 29.1 | |
| Labour Co-op hold | | Swing | | |

=== Banbury Hardwick ===
Banbury Hardwick
| Party | Candidate | Votes | % | ±% |
|---|---|---|---|---|
| Conservative | Nathan Bignell | 817 | 49.7 | |
| Labour | Blue Watson | 417 | 25.4 | |
| Green | Karl Kwiatkowski | 215 | 13.1 | |
| UKIP | Heather Firkin | 194 | 11.8 | |
| Majority | | 400 | 24.3 | |
| Turnout | | 1,654 | 26.2 | |
| Conservative hold | | Swing | | |

=== Banbury Ruscote ===
Banbury Ruscote
| Party | Candidate | Votes | % | ±% |
|---|---|---|---|---|
| Labour Co-op | Sean Woodcock | 790 | 53.9 | |
| Conservative | Chris Phillips | 487 | 33.2 | |
| Liberal Democrats | Ian Thomas | 189 | 12.9 | |
| Majority | | 303 | 20.7 | |
| Turnout | | 1,525 | 23.8 | |
| Labour Co-op hold | | Swing | | |

=== Bicester East ===
Bicester East
| Party | Candidate | Votes | % | ±% |
|---|---|---|---|---|
| Conservative | Richard Mould | 740 | 40.1 | |
| Green | Robert Nixon | 620 | 33.6 | |
| Labour Co-op | Celia Kavuma | 348 | 18.9 | |
| Liberal Democrats | Bruce Shakespeare | 136 | 7.4 | |
| Majority | | 120 | 6.5 | |
| Turnout | | 1,882 | 31.0 | |
| Conservative hold | | Swing | | |

=== Bicester North & Caversfield ===
Bicester North & Caversfield
| Party | Candidate | Votes | % | ±% |
|---|---|---|---|---|
| Conservative | Jason Slaymaker | 794 | 47.9 | |
| Green | Francis Boon | 298 | 18.0 | |
| Liberal Democrats | Dan Murphy | 291 | 17.6 | |
| Labour | Margarey Lyon | 274 | 16.5 | |
| Majority | | 496 | 29.9 | |
| Turnout | | 1,686 | 27.4 | |
| Conservative hold | | Swing | | |

=== Bicester South & Ambrosden ===
Bicester South & Ambrosden
| Party | Candidate | Votes | % | ±% |
|---|---|---|---|---|
| Independent | Nick Cotter | 1,259 | 56.5 | |
| Conservative | Zoe Mclernon | 675 | 30.3 | |
| Labour | Marcus English | 296 | 13.3 | |
| Majority | | 584 | 26.2 | |
| Turnout | | 2,246 | 29.4 | |
| Independent gain from Conservative | | Swing | | |

=== Bicester West ===
Bicester West
| Party | Candidate | Votes | % | ±% |
|---|---|---|---|---|
| Independent | Fraser Webster | 1,285 | 57.5 | |
| Conservative | Debbie Pickford | 597 | 26.7 | |
| Labour | John Melrose | 352 | 15.8 | |
| Majority | | 688 | 30.8 | |
| Turnout | | 2,256 | 34.5 | |
| Independent gain from Conservative | | Swing | | |

=== Cropredy, Sibfords & Wroxton ===
Cropredy, Sibfords & Wroxton
| Party | Candidate | Votes | % | ±% |
|---|---|---|---|---|
| Conservative | Douglas Webb | 1,503 | 58.8 | |
| Liberal Democrats | Julian Woodward | 653 | 25.6 | |
| Labour | Anne Cullen | 398 | 15.6 | |
| Majority | | 850 | 33.2 | |
| Turnout | | 2,625 | 40.8 | |
| Conservative hold | | Swing | | |

=== Deddington ===
Deddington
| Party | Candidate | Votes | % | ±% |
|---|---|---|---|---|
| Conservative | Hugo Brown | 1,376 | 49.9 | |
| Green | Aaron Bliss | 523 | 19.0 | |
| Liberal Democrats | Nigel Davis | 477 | 17.3 | |
| Labour | Annette Murphy | 382 | 13.9 | |
| Majority | | 853 | 30.9 | |
| Turnout | | 2,812 | 38.5 | |
| Conservative hold | | Swing | | |

=== Fringford & Heyfords ===
Fringford & Heyfords
| Party | Candidate | Votes | % | ±% |
|---|---|---|---|---|
| Conservative | Ian Corkin | 1,223 | 55.2 | |
| Green | Jenny Tamblyn | 420 | 18.9 | |
| Liberal Democrats | Dillie Keane | 394 | 17.8 | |
| UKIP | Alan Harris | 180 | 8.1 | |
| Majority | | 803 | 36.2 | |
| Turnout | | 2,230 | 34.9 | |
| Conservative hold | | Swing | | |

=== Kidlington East ===
Kidlington East
| Party | Candidate | Votes | % | ±% |
|---|---|---|---|---|
| Green | Ian Middleton | 1,089 | 40.4 | |
| Conservative | Neil Prestidge | 1,016 | 37.7 | |
| Labour | John Stansby | 377 | 14.0 | |
| UKIP | Anthony Morris | 214 | 7.9 | |
| Majority | | 73 | 2.7 | |
| Turnout | | 2,724 | 38.2 | |
| Green gain from Conservative | | Swing | | |

=== Kidlington West ===
Kidlington West
| Party | Candidate | Votes | % | ±% |
|---|---|---|---|---|
| Liberal Democrats | Katherine Tyson | 1,493 | 52.7 | |
| Liberal Democrats | Conrad Copeland | 1,436 | 50.7 | |
| Conservative | Nigel Simpson | 816 | 28.8 | |
| Conservative | Alan Mackenzie-Wintle | 786 | 27.8 | |
| Labour | Chuk Okeke | 402 | 14.2 | |
| UKIP | Hilary Valk | 252 | 8.9 | |
| Majority | | 620 | 22.9 | |
| Turnout | | 2,852 | 41.2 | |
| Liberal Democrats gain from Conservative | | Swing | | |
| Liberal Democrats gain from Conservative | | Swing | | |

=== Launton & Otmoor ===
Launton & Otmoor
| Party | Candidate | Votes | % | ±% |
|---|---|---|---|---|
| Conservative | Tim Hallchurch | 1,171 | 57.6 | |
| Labour | Michael Nixon | 863 | 42.4 | |
| Majority | | 308 | 15.2 | |
| Turnout | | 2,164 | 35.7 | |
| Conservative hold | | Swing | | |
