= 2023 Cherwell District Council election =

2023 UK local government election

- 4 May 2023

16 out of 48 seats to Cherwell District Council 25 seats needed for a majority

	First party	Second party	Third party
Leader	Barry Wood	Sean Woodcock	David Hingley
Party	Conservative	Labour	Liberal Democrats
Last election	25 seats, 38.4%	10 seats, 24.8%	7 seats, 26.4%
Seats before	25	9	7
Seats won	3	5	5
Seats after	20	12	10
Seat change	▼5	▲3	▲3
Popular vote	12,735	9,641	9,461
Percentage	34.0%	25.7%	25.2%
Swing	▼4.8%	▲0.9%	▼1.2%
	Fourth party	Fifth party
Leader	Ian Middleton
Party	Green	Independent
Last election	2 seats, 7.7%	4 seats, 2.6%
Seats before	2	5
Seats won	2	1
Seats after	3	3
Seat change	▲1	▼2
Popular vote	4,160	1,486
Percentage	11.1%	4.0%
Swing	▲3.4%	▲1.4%
- The winner of each ward in the 2023 Cherwell District Council Election
Leader before election
Barry Wood
Conservative
Leader after election
Barry Wood
Conservative
No overall control

The 2023 Cherwell District Council election took place on 4 May 2023 to elect members of Cherwell District Council in Oxfordshire, England. This was on the same day as other local elections in England.

The Conservatives lost control of the council to no overall control. Attempts to form a coalition of the other parties failed to produce an alternative administration. The Conservative leader of the council, Barry Wood, was removed from office at the council's annual meeting on 17 May 2023, but as the council could not agree on a replacement leader the meeting was then adjourned until 23 May 2023. No alternative leader who could command a majority had emerged by then either, and so Barry Wood was reinstated as leader, in charge of a Conservative minority administration.

Green Party leader Ian Middleton said this was because the Labour Party National Executive Committee had told the local Labour Party that they could not have any Green or Independent councillors in roles in the Executive.

== Overall results ==
The overall results were as follows:

2023 Cherwell District Council election
Party	This election			Full council			This election		
Party	Seats	Net	Seats %	Other	Total	Total %	Votes	Votes %	+/−
Conservative	3	▼5	18.8	17	20	41.7	12,735	34.0	-4.8
Labour	5	▲3	31.3	7	12	25.0	9,641	25.7	+0.9
Liberal Democrats	5	▲3	31.3	5	10	20.8	9,461	25.2	-1.2
Green	2	▲1	12.5	1	3	6.3	4,160	11.1	+3.4
Independent	1	▼2	6.3	2	3	6.3	1,486	4.0	+1.4

== Ward results ==
The Statement of Persons Nominated, which details the candidates standing in each ward, was released by Cherwell District Council following the close of nominations on 4 April 2023. The results for each ward were:

=== Adderbury, Bloxham and Bodicote ===
Adderbury, Bloxham and Bodicote
Party	Candidate	Votes	%	±%
Liberal Democrats	Robert Pattenden	1,540	53.6	−6.3
Conservative	David Bunn	913	31.8	+1.8
Labour	Helen Oldfield	345	12.0	+1.9
Independent	Paul Tucker	73	2.5	N/A
Majority		627	21.8	
Turnout		2,871	37.85	
Registered electors		7,604		
Liberal Democrats gain from Conservative		Swing		

=== Banbury Calthorpe & Easington ===
Banbury Calthorpe & Easington
Party	Candidate	Votes	%	±%
Labour	Lynne Parsons	1,217	42.6	−0.1
Conservative	Fiaz Ahmed	1,055	36.9	−9.8
Liberal Democrats	David Yeomans	244	8.1	−2.5
Green	Julia Middleton	213	7.4	N/A
Independent	John Brown	131	4.6	N/A
Majority		162	5.7	
Turnout		2,860	32.93	
Registered electors		8,731		
Labour gain from Conservative		Swing	▲4.85	

=== Banbury Cross & Neithrop ===
Banbury Cross & Neithrop
Party	Candidate	Votes	%	±%
Labour	Becky Clarke	1,058	54.6	+3.8
Conservative	Munoz Dungo	443	22.8	−12.6
Green	Linda Catherine Ward	159	8.2	N/A
Liberal Democrats	Andrew Raisbeck	141	7.2	−6.6
Independent	Simon Garrett	80	4.1	N/A
Independent	Tim Barrett	58	3.0	N/A
Majority		615	31.7	
Turnout		1,939	26.18	−3.3
Registered electors		7,461		
Labour hold		Swing		

=== Banbury Grimsbury & Hightown ===
Banbury Grimsbury & Hightown
Party	Candidate	Votes	%	±%
Labour Co-op	Sean Woodcock*	1,030	55.6	−0.9
Conservative	Zeeshan Ahmed	389	21.0	−6.1
Green	Karl Kwiatkowski	175	9.5	+0.9
Liberal Democrats	Sophie Parker-Manuel	143	7.7	−0.1
Independent	Cassi Perry	114	6.2	N/A
Majority		641	34.6	
Turnout		1,851	26.27	
Registered electors		7,110		
Labour Co-op hold		Swing		

=== Banbury Hardwick ===
Banbury Hardwick
Party	Candidate	Votes	%	±%
Labour	Besmira Brasha	809	46.1	+2.9
Conservative	Tony Ilott	716	40.2	+1.4
Green	Amanda Maguire	231	13.2	+3.3
Majority		93	5.9	+1.5
Turnout		1,756	23.2	−2
Registered electors		7,612		
Labour gain from Conservative		Swing	▲0.75	

=== Banbury Ruscote ===
Banbury Ruscote
Party	Candidate	Votes	%	±%
Labour	Isabel Creed	884	58.5	+2.8
Conservative	Jayne Strangwood	388	25.7	−8.2
Green	Carol Broom	95	6.3	N/A
Liberal Democrats	Mark Petterson	74	4.9	−5.5
Independent	Julie Battison	70	4.6	N/A
Majority		496	32.8	
Turnout		1,511	21.29	
Registered electors		7,124		
Labour hold		Swing		

=== Bicester East ===
Bicester East
Party	Candidate	Votes	%	±%
Green	Tom Beckett	843	41.6	+14.0
Conservative	Sam Holland	767	37.9	−10.1
Labour	Jane Clements	416	20.5	−4.0
Majority		76	3.8	
Turnout		2,026	32.08	
Registered electors		6,377		
Green gain from Conservative		Swing		

=== Bicester North & Caversfield ===
Bicester North & Caversfield
Party	Candidate	Votes	%	±%
Liberal Democrats	Simon Lytton	794	39.6	+19.8
Conservative	Jason Slaymaker*	676	33.7	−7.2
Labour	Arjun Bais	536	26.7	−1.3
Majority		118	5.9	
Turnout		2,006	31.13	
Registered electors		6,502		
Liberal Democrats gain from Conservative		Swing		

=== Bicester South & Ambrosden ===
Bicester South & Ambrosden
Party	Candidate	Votes	%	±%
Liberal Democrats	Nick Cotter*	1,660	56.8	+1.4
Conservative	Sammy Omotayo	808	27.7	−3.7
Labour	Robert Nixon	453	15.5	+3.2
Majority		852	29.1	
Turnout		2,921	29.57	
Registered electors		9,948		
Liberal Democrats gain from Independent		Swing		

=== Bicester West ===
Bicester West
Party	Candidate	Votes	%	±%
Independent	Harry Knight	777	40.0	−12.3
Conservative	Alex Thrupp	472	24.3	−5.1
Labour	Christopher Howells	397	20.4	+2.1
Liberal Democrats	Martin Chadwick	188	9.7	N/A
Green	Damien Maguire	110	5.7	N/A
Majority		305	15.7	
Turnout		1,944	29.93	
Registered electors		6,559		
Independent hold		Swing		

=== Cropredy, Sibfords & Wroxton ===
Cropredy, Sibfords & Wroxton
Party	Candidate	Votes	%	±%
Conservative	Douglas Webb*	1,247	44.9	−4.9
Liberal Democrats	Xenia Huntley	856	30.8	+5.6
Labour	Siân Tohill-Martin	439	15.8	−9.2
Green	Victoria Campbell	238	8.6	N/A
Majority		391	14.1	
Turnout		2,780	40.19	
Registered electors		6,967		
Conservative hold		Swing		

=== Deddington ===
Deddington
Party	Candidate	Votes	%	±%
Conservative	Andrew McHugh	1,280	43.8	−2.1
Labour	Annette Murphy	796	27.2	+4.8
Liberal Democrats	James Hartley	547	18.7	−2.0
Green	Linda Newbery	300	10.3	−0.7
Majority		484	16.6	
Turnout		2,923	39.65	
Registered electors		7,430		
Conservative hold		Swing		

=== Fringford & Heyfords ===
Fringford & Heyfords
Party	Candidate	Votes	%	±%
Conservative	Nigel Simpson	1,049	42.2	−0.3
Liberal Democrats	Mark Chivers	774	31.1	+10.8
Labour	Alex Williams	373	15.0	−3.9
Green	Jenny Tamblyn	291	11.7	−6.6
Majority		275	11.1	
Turnout		2,487	34.77	
Registered electors		7,179		
Conservative hold		Swing		

=== Kidlington East ===
Kidlington East
Party	Candidate	Votes	%	±%
Green	Ian Middleton*	1,505	57.0	+10.2
Conservative	Tony Puffer	678	25.7	−12.2
Labour Co-op	Barry Richards	276	10.4	−4.9
Independent	Philip Brown	183	6.9	N/A
Majority		827	31.3	
Turnout		2,642	37.86	
Registered electors		7,036		
Green hold		Swing		

=== Kidlington West ===
Kidlington West
Party	Candidate	Votes	%	±%
Liberal Democrats	Lesley McLean	1,410	56.2	+3.8
Conservative	Rosie Hillard	802	32.0	−4.0
Labour	Matthew Bevington	297	11.8	+0.2
Majority		608	24.2	
Turnout		2,509	36.25	
Registered electors		6,983		
Liberal Democrats hold		Swing		

=== Launton & Otmoor ===
Launton & Otmoor
Party	Candidate	Votes	%	±%
Liberal Democrats	Julian Nedelcu	1,120	45.0	−4.5
Conservative	David Hughes	1,052	42.3	+1.5
Labour	Naomi Karslake	315	12.7	+4.1
Majority		68	2.7	
Turnout		2,477	38.7	
Registered electors		6,490		
Liberal Democrats gain from Conservative		Swing		
