= 2006 Cherwell District Council election =

2006 UK local government election

Results of the 2006 Cherwell District Council election

The 2006 Cherwell District Council election took place on 4 May 2006 to elect members of Cherwell District Council in Oxfordshire, England. One third of the council was up for election and the Conservative Party stayed in overall control of the council.

In total 45 candidates stood in the election competing for the 18 seats which were up for election. The results saw the Conservatives win 15 of the 18 seats contested. They gained 2 seats from Labour in the Banbury wards of Neithrop and Grimsbury and Castle. Their victory in Neithrop was the first time in over 30 years that Labour had not won the ward and saw the first muslim councillor, Alyas Ahmed, elected to Cherwell council. The Liberal Democrats also picked up a seat from Labour in Kidlington South where the Labour group leader on the council, Andrew Hornsby-Smith, stood down at the election. Labour only managed to keep one of their seats in the election, in Banbury Ruscote, where George Parish was re-elected. Turnout in the election ranged from a low of 20% to a high of 51%.

After the election, the composition of the council was:

- Conservative 38
- Labour 8
- Liberal Democrat 4

== Election result ==
Cherwell local election result 2006
Party	Seats	Gains	Losses	Net gain/loss	Seats %	Votes %	Votes	+/−
Conservative	15	2	0	+2	83.3	60.2	14,957	+3.1%
Liberal Democrats	2	1	0	+1	11.1	24.8	6,167	+7.7%
Labour	1	0	3	-3	5.6	14.3	3,563	-9.9%
Green	0	0	0	0	0	0.6	148	+0.0%

== Ward results ==
Banbury Calthorpe
Party	Candidate	Votes	%	±%
Conservative	Colin Clarke	782	64.8	
Labour	Hanry Goodman	261	21.6	
Liberal Democrats	Suzanne Wilson-Higgins	164	13.6	
Majority		521	43.2	
Turnout		1,207		
Conservative hold		Swing		

Banbury Easington
Party	Candidate	Votes	%	±%
Conservative	Kieron Mallon	1,357	64.1	−5.2
Labour	Martin Weir	382	18.0	−12.7
Liberal Democrats	Pamela Linzey-Jones	379	17.9	+17.9
Majority		975	46.1	+7.5
Turnout		2,118		
Conservative hold		Swing		

Banbury Grimsbury and Castle
Party	Candidate	Votes	%	±%
Conservative	Margaret Cullip	862	50.2	−6.9
Labour	Andrew Beere	520	30.3	−12.6
Liberal Democrats	Choudry Anjum	334	19.5	+19.5
Majority		342	19.9	+5.7
Turnout		1,716		
Conservative gain from Labour		Swing		

Banbury Hardwick
Party	Candidate	Votes	%	±%
Conservative	Stuart Robbins	782	59.9	−6.2
Labour	Neil Mepham	343	26.3	−7.6
Liberal Democrats	Frank Davies	181	13.9	+13.9
Majority		439	33.6	+1.4
Turnout		1,306		
Conservative hold		Swing		

Banbury Neithrop
Party	Candidate	Votes	%	±%
Conservative	Alyas Ahmed	572	49.5	+4.8
Labour	Richard Doy	371	32.1	−23.2
Liberal Democrats	Peter Johnson	212	18.4	+18.4
Majority		201	17.4	
Turnout		1,155		
Conservative gain from Labour		Swing		

Banbury Ruscote
Party	Candidate	Votes	%	±%
Labour	George Parish	748	51.5	−2.1
Conservative	Elizabeth Macleod	559	38.5	−7.9
Liberal Democrats	Deborah Atsoparthis	145	10.0	+10.0
Majority		189	13.0	+5.8
Turnout		1,452		
Labour hold		Swing		

Bicester West
Party	Candidate	Votes	%	±%
Conservative	Norman Bolster	1,292	69.5	+12.1
Labour	John Broad	566	30.5	−0.5
Majority		726	39.0	+12.6
Turnout		1,858		
Conservative hold		Swing		

Bloxham and Bodicote
Party	Candidate	Votes	%	±%
Conservative	Eric Heath	1,254	70.6	+7.4
Liberal Democrats	Peter Davis	523	29.4	−7.4
Majority		731	41.2	+14.8
Turnout		1,777		
Conservative hold		Swing		

Cropredy
Party	Candidate	Votes	%	±%
Conservative	Kenneth Atack	703	74.3	−3.2
Liberal Democrats	Stephen Creed	243	25.7	+3.2
Majority		460	48.6	−6.4
Turnout		946		
Conservative hold		Swing		

Deddington
Party	Candidate	Votes	%	±%
Conservative	Paul O'Sullivan	675	62.2	+2.9
Liberal Democrats	Martin Squires	410	37.8	−2.9
Majority		265	24.4	+5.8
Turnout		1,085		
Conservative hold		Swing		

Fringford
Party	Candidate	Votes	%	±%
Conservative	Barry Wood	727	84.8	+14.5
Liberal Democrats	Nicholas Cotter	130	15.2	−14.5
Majority		597	69.6	+29.0
Turnout		857		
Conservative hold		Swing		

Kidlington North
Party	Candidate	Votes	%	±%
Liberal Democrats	Chris Pack	906	59.7	+5.1
Conservative	Michael Hunt	612	40.3	+11.9
Majority		294	19.4	−6.8
Turnout		1,518		
Liberal Democrats hold		Swing		

Kidlington South
Party	Candidate	Votes	%	±%
Liberal Democrats	Devena Rae	1,115	44.6	+13.1
Conservative	Mary Young	863	34.5	−3.5
Labour	Martin Keighery	372	14.9	−9.9
Green	Janet Warren	148	5.9	+0.2
Majority		152	10.1	
Turnout		2,498		
Liberal Democrats gain from Labour		Swing		

Kirtlington
Party	Candidate	Votes	%	±%
Conservative	Neil Godwin	650	73.4	+16.4
Liberal Democrats	Andrew Murray	235	26.6	−16.4
Majority		415	46.8	+32.8
Turnout		885		
Conservative hold		Swing		

Otmoor
Party	Candidate	Votes	%	±%
Conservative	Timothy Hallchurch	566	68.4	+8.0
Liberal Democrats	Elisabeth Yardley	262	31.6	−8.0
Majority		304	36.8	+16.0
Turnout		828		
Conservative hold		Swing		

Sibford
Party	Candidate	Votes	%	±%
Conservative	George Reynolds	796	79.4	
Liberal Democrats	Janice Johnson	206	20.6	
Majority		590	58.8	
Turnout		1,002		
Conservative hold		Swing		

The Astons and Heyfords
Party	Candidate	Votes	%	±%
Conservative	James Macnamara	1,146	73.2	+24.4
Liberal Democrats	Neil Walton	420	26.8	−24.4
Majority		726	44.4	
Turnout		1,566		
Conservative hold		Swing		

Wroxton
Party	Candidate	Votes	%	±%
Conservative	Douglas Webb	759	71.5	
Liberal Democrats	Anthony Burns	302	28.5	
Majority		457	43.0	
Turnout		1,061		
Conservative hold		Swing		
