= 2002 Cherwell District Council election =

Election of Cherwell District Council members (2002)

Results of the 2002 Cherwell District Council election

The 2002 Cherwell District Council election took place on 2 May 2002 to elect members of Cherwell District Council in Oxfordshire, England. The whole council was up for election with boundary changes since the last election in 2000 reducing the number of seats by 2. The Conservative Party stayed in overall control of the council.

The election saw the two independent councillors and one independent Socialist councillor stand down from the council after deciding not to seek re-election. When the candidates were announced, five Conservatives including the leader of the council, George Reynolds, were unopposed in the election. The results saw the Conservative Party consolidate their control of the council after winning 37 of the 50 seats on the council including all of the seats in Bicester.

== Election result ==
Cherwell local election result 2002
Party	Seats	Gains	Losses	Net gain/loss	Seats %	Votes %	Votes	+/−
Conservative	37			+4	74.0	51.3	28,899	-0.2%
Labour	11			-1	22.0	31.7	17,876	+2.5%
Liberal Democrats	2			-2	4.0	16.0	9,023	-3.3%
Green	0			0	0	0.6	319	+0.6%
Independent	0			-2	0	0.4	212	+0.4%
Independent Labour	0			-1	0	0	0	0

== Ward results ==
Adderbury
Party	Candidate	Votes	%	±%
Conservative	J Harper	unopposed		

Ambrosden and Chesterton
Party	Candidate	Votes	%	±%
Conservative	A Fulljames	513	64.9	
Liberal Democrats	C Bearder	197	24.9	
Labour	M Lynch	81	10.2	
Majority		316	40.0	
Turnout		791		

The Astons and Heyfords (2)
Party	Candidate	Votes	%	±%
Conservative	J Macnamara	715		
Conservative	T Miall	610		
Liberal Democrats	R Makepeace	538		
Liberal Democrats	P Makepeace	502		
Labour	M Stuart	158		
Turnout		2,523		

Banbury Calthorpe (2)
Party	Candidate	Votes	%	±%
Conservative	E Macleod	609		
Conservative	A Milne Home	607		
Labour	T Conrad	421		
Labour	M Weir	349		
Turnout		1,986		

Banbury Easington (3)
Party	Candidate	Votes	%	±%
Conservative	K Mallon	1,172		
Conservative	C Blackwell	1,154		
Conservative	B Smith	1,108		
Labour	D Bullock	512		
Liberal Democrats	D Nash	477		
Labour	B Dhesi	471		
Labour	K Harper	434		
Turnout		5,328		

Banbury Grimsbury and Castle (3)
Party	Candidate	Votes	%	±%
Labour	R Collins	810		
Labour	N Mepham	748		
Labour	S Mold	721		
Conservative	C Bonner	619		
Conservative	A Carney	564		
Conservative	J Vine	522		
Turnout		3,984		

Banbury Hardwick (3)
Party	Candidate	Votes	%	±%
Conservative	E Milne	524		
Conservative	M Fermoy	498		
Conservative	N Turner	447		
Labour	M Hunt	373		
Labour	R Mold	285		
Independent	C Rowe	212		
Turnout		2,339		

Banbury Neithrop (2)
Party	Candidate	Votes	%	±%
Labour	R Doy	613		
Labour	S Dhesi	585		
Conservative	B Scutter	312		
Conservative	G Wills	306		
Turnout		1,816		

Banbury Ruscote (3)
Party	Candidate	Votes	%	±%
Labour	G Parish	831		
Labour	P Cartledge	770		
Labour	J Justice	761		
Conservative	K Strangewood	575		
Conservative	P Tompson	477		
Conservative	T Wren	475		
Turnout		3,889		

Bicester East (2)
Party	Candidate	Votes	%	±%
Conservative	G Archer	600		
Conservative	A Kempton	551		
Labour	J Hanna	543		
Labour	A Roberts	473		
Liberal Democrats	O Afilaka	157		
Turnout		2,324		

Bicester North (2)
Party	Candidate	Votes	%	±%
Conservative	L Pratt	781		
Conservative	E Gilmore	743		
Labour	S Moss	310		
Liberal Democrats	A Murray	256		
Labour	A Koumas	255		
Turnout		2,345		

Bicester South (2)
Party	Candidate	Votes	%	±%
Conservative	L Stratford	480		
Conservative	R Stratford	419		
Liberal Democrats	N Cotter	267		
Labour	N Cherry	212		
Turnout		1,378		

Bicester Town (2)
Party	Candidate	Votes	%	±%
Conservative	D Pickford	621		
Conservative	D Edwards	611		
Labour	W Spencer	471		
Labour	D Wood	438		
Liberal Democrats	N Walton	178		
Liberal Democrats	D Connett	171		
Turnout		2,490		

Bicester West (3)
Party	Candidate	Votes	%	±%
Conservative	N Bolster	934		
Conservative	D Spencer	902		
Conservative	R Hurle	880		
Labour	L Sibley	819		
Labour	P Pointer	706		
Labour	A Hasted	643		
Liberal Democrats	R Wills	277		
Liberal Democrats	D Atsoparthis	214		
Liberal Democrats	P Johnson	206		
Turnout		5,581		

Bloxham and Bodicote (2)
Party	Candidate	Votes	%	±%
Conservative	E Heath	1,210		
Conservative	L Smart	1,117		
Liberal Democrats	P Davis	642		
Liberal Democrats	A Kaye	605		
Turnout		3,574		

Caversfield
Party	Candidate	Votes	%	±%
Conservative	C Fulljames	451	75.0	
Liberal Democrats	W Bruder	80	13.3	
Labour	M Blacker	70	11.6	
Majority		371	61.7	
Turnout		601		

Cropredy
Party	Candidate	Votes	%	±%
Conservative	R Higham	unopposed		

Deddington
Party	Candidate	Votes	%	±%
Conservative	P O'Sullivan	578	59.3	
Liberal Democrats	M Squires	396	40.7	
Majority		282	18.6	
Turnout		974		

Fringford
Party	Candidate	Votes	%	±%
Conservative	B Wood	526	70.3	
Liberal Democrats	R Rookwood	222	29.7	
Majority		304	40.6	
Turnout		748		

Hook Norton
Party	Candidate	Votes	%	±%
Conservative	D Gasson	unopposed		

Kidlington North (2)
Party	Candidate	Votes	%	±%
Liberal Democrats	C Pack	568		
Liberal Democrats	J Wyse	544		
Conservative	S Goodgame	464		
Conservative	M Young	450		
Labour	J Ruiz	368		
Labour	C Witcher	347		
Green	J Warren	144		
Turnout		2,885		

Kidlington South (3)
Party	Candidate	Votes	%	±%
Labour	A Hornsby-Smith	982		
Labour	R Laynes	982		
Labour	J Stansby	901		
Conservative	O Kelland	587		
Conservative	B Carter	583		
Conservative	J Lord	522		
Liberal Democrats	D Rae	394		
Liberal Democrats	A Graham	382		
Liberal Democrats	V Robinson	303		
Turnout		5,636		

Kirtlington
Party	Candidate	Votes	%	±%
Conservative	N Godwin	510	57.0	
Liberal Democrats	B Wing	385	43.0	
Majority		125	14.0	
Turnout		895		

Launton
Party	Candidate	Votes	%	±%
Conservative	D Hughes	670	77.0	
Liberal Democrats	R Brown	200	23.0	
Majority		470	54.0	
Turnout		870		

Otmoor
Party	Candidate	Votes	%	±%
Conservative	T Hallchurch	459	60.4	
Liberal Democrats	E Yardley	301	39.6	
Majority		158	20.8	
Turnout		760		

Sibford
Party	Candidate	Votes	%	±%
Conservative	G Reynolds	unopposed		

Wroxton
Party	Candidate	Votes	%	±%
Conservative	L Mansell	unopposed		

Yarnton, Gosford and Water Eaton (2)
Party	Candidate	Votes	%	±%
Conservative	M Hastings	735		
Conservative	V Billington	708		
Liberal Democrats	M Gibbard	316		
Liberal Democrats	A Craddock	245		
Labour	C Arakelian	226		
Labour	G Taylor	207		
Green	N Goodwin	175		
Turnout		2,612		
