= 2011 Cherwell District Council election =

2011 UK local government election

Results of the 2011 Cherwell District Council election

The 2011 Cherwell District Council election took place on 5 May 2011 to elect members of Cherwell District Council in Oxfordshire, England. One third of the council was up for election and the Conservative Party stayed in overall control of the council.

In all 16 seats were contested, out of 50 on the council. The Conservative party remained in overall control with 43 seats, a net loss of just one seat. There was one Conservative gain, the Bicester South ward taken by Lynn Pratt from Liberal Democrat leader Nick Cotter, but Labour gained two seats from Conservative, with Patrick Cartledge regaining the Banbury Ruscote seat which he had lost to the Conservatives in 2008, and Andrew Beere taking Banbury Grimsbury and Castle by 15 votes, also from the Conservatives. Labour increased their council seats from two to four, whereas the loss of the Bicester South ward by the Liberal Democrat party left them with three councillors, and so were replaced by Labour as official opposition on the council.

After the election, the composition of the council was

- Conservative 43
- Labour 4
- Liberal Democrat 3

== Election result ==
Cherwell local election result 2011
Party	Seats	Gains	Losses	Net gain/loss	Seats %	Votes %	Votes	+/−
Conservative	12	1	2	-1		51.0	14962	
Labour	3	2		+2		29.2	8565	
Liberal Democrats	1		1	-1				
Green	0			0				
Independent	0			0				
Labour Co-op	0			0				

== Ward results ==
Ambrosden and Chesterton
Party	Candidate	Votes	%	±%
Conservative	Andrew John Fulljames	718	73.6	
Liberal Democrats	John Willett	257	26.4	
Majority		461		
Turnout		975	43.2	
Conservative hold		Swing		

Banbury Easington
Party	Candidate	Votes	%	±%
Conservative	Nigel John Morris	1353	51.1	
Labour Co-op	Surinder Dhesi	875	33.1	
Green	Katherine Jane Chandler	247	9.3	
Liberal Democrats	Andy Murray	172	6.5	
Majority		478		
Turnout		2647	44.7	
Conservative hold		Swing		

Banbury Grimsbury and Castle
Party	Candidate	Votes	%	±%
Labour	Andrew Gerald Beere	969	40.9	
Conservative	Chris Smithson	954	40.3	
Green	Andrew John Haywood	230	9.7	
Liberal Democrats	Kenneth William Ashworth	214	9.0	
Majority		15		
Turnout		2367	31.1	
Labour gain from Conservative		Swing		

Banbury Hardwick
Party	Candidate	Votes	%	±%
Conservative	Nicholas Patrick Turner	1035	51.5	
Labour	Sean Lee Woodcock	636	31.6	
Green	Stephen Christopher Hartley	197	9.8	
Liberal Democrats	Steve Creed	142	7.1	
Majority		399		
Turnout		2010	33.1	
Conservative hold		Swing		

Banbury Ruscote
Party	Candidate	Votes	%	±%
Labour	Patrick Samuel Cartledge	1058	54.4	
Conservative	Keith Strangwood	762	39.2	
Liberal Democrats	Tony Burns	125	6.4	
Majority		296		
Turnout		1945	34.9	
Labour gain from Conservative		Swing		

Bicester East
Party	Candidate	Votes	%	±%
Conservative	Rose Thirza Jane Stratford	972	60.3	
Labour	John Hanna	641	39.7	
Majority		331		
Turnout		1613	39.6	
Conservative hold		Swing		

Bicester North
Party	Candidate	Votes	%	±%
Conservative	Carol Stewart	1013	58.9	
Labour	Kevin Lawrence Walsh	432	25.1	
Liberal Democrats	John Alexander Innes	275	16.0	
Majority		581		
Turnout		1720	37.3	
Conservative hold		Swing		

Bicester South
Party	Candidate	Votes	%	±%
Conservative	Lynn Mary Pratt	677	43.8	
Liberal Democrats	Nick Cotter	550	35.6	
Labour	Neil Ridges Payne	234	15.1	
Green	Graham Allan Newell	86	5.6	
Majority		127		
Turnout		1547	41.9	
Conservative gain from Liberal Democrats		Swing		

Bicester Town
Party	Candidate	Votes	%	±%
Conservative	Diana May Edwards	852	60.5	
Labour	John Leslie Broad	557	39.5	
Majority		295		
Turnout		1409	38.8	
Conservative hold		Swing		

Bicester West
Party	Candidate	Votes	%	±%
Labour	Les Sibley	1286	56.4	
Conservative	James Ferris Porter	994	43.6	
Majority		292		
Turnout		2280	43.4	
Labour hold		Swing		

Cropredy
Party	Candidate	Votes	%	±%
Conservative	Ken Atack	748	60.0	
Independent	Ray Barron-Woolfold	255	20.5	
Labour	Derek John Evans	163	13.1	
Liberal Democrats	Janice Johnson	80	6.4	
Majority		493		
Turnout		1246	55.9	
Conservative hold		Swing		

Hook Norton
Party	Candidate	Votes	%	±%
Conservative	Victoria Louise Irvine	686	58.5	
Labour	Perran Henry Rupert Moon	367	31.3	
Liberal Democrats	Peter Davis	119	10.2	
Majority		319		
Turnout		1172	56.7	
Conservative hold		Swing		

Kidlington North
Party	Candidate	Votes	%	±%
Liberal Democrats	Alaric David Hammond Rose	771	39.7	
Conservative	Sandra Rhodes	757	38.9	
Labour	Trevor Alan Blake	295	15.2	
Green	Alastair Theodore White	121	6.2	
Majority		14		
Turnout		1944	48.2	
Liberal Democrats hold		Swing		

Kidlington South
Party	Candidate	Votes	%	±%
Conservative	Neil Prestidge	1236	41.2	
Liberal Democrats	Alan William Graham	861	28.7	
Labour	David James	691	23.0	
Green	Janet Malvine Warren	212	7.1	
Majority		375		
Turnout		3000	48.6	
Conservative hold		Swing		

The Astons and Heyfords
Party	Candidate	Votes	%	±%
Conservative	Mike Kerford-Byrnes	1103	62.2	
Green	Mary Rachel Franklin	348	19.6	
Liberal Democrats	Liz Yardley	322	18.2	
Majority		755		
Turnout		1773	46.7	
Conservative hold		Swing		

Yarnton, Gosford and Water Eaton
Party	Candidate	Votes	%	±%
Conservative	Michael John Gibbard	1102	65.6	
Labour	Andrew Hornsby-Smith	361	21.5	
Liberal Democrats	Suzanne Wilson-Higgins	217	12.9	
Majority		741		
Turnout		1680	46.1	
Conservative hold		Swing		
