= 2000 Cherwell District Council election =

2000 UK local government election

The 2000 Cherwell District Council election took place on 4 May 2000 to elect members of Cherwell District Council in Oxfordshire, England. One third of the council was up for election and the Conservative Party gained overall control of the council from no overall control.

The results saw the Conservatives gain 7 seats, 6 of them from the Labour Party, to win a majority on the council for the first time since 1995. Conservative gains came mainly in the Banbury and Bicester areas, with the biggest name Labour councillor to lose in the election being the former mayor, John Hanna. One of the Conservative winners in the election was Mary Young, who won in South East Kidlington ward to become a councillor for the first time at the age of 81. Turnout in the election varied from a high of 53% in Ruscote to a low of 11% in Neithrop.

After the election, the composition of the council was:

- Conservative 33
- Labour 13
- Liberal Democrat 4
- Independent 2

== Election result ==
Cherwell local election result 2000
| Party | Seats | Gains | Losses | Net gain/loss | Seats % | Votes % | Votes | +/− |
|---|---|---|---|---|---|---|---|---|
| Conservative | 15 | 7 | 0 | +7 | 83.3 | 51.5 | 9,848 | |
| Labour | 2 | 0 | 6 | -6 | 11.1 | 29.2 | 5,587 | |
| Liberal Democrats | 1 | 1 | 2 | -1 | 5.6 | 19.3 | 3,702 | |

== Ward results ==
Adderbury
| Party | Candidate | Votes | % | ±% |
|---|---|---|---|---|
| Conservative | John Harper | 590 | 73.9 | |
| Liberal Democrats | David Puckering | 208 | 26.1 | |
| Majority | | 382 | 47.8 | |
| Turnout | | 798 | 38.1 | |
| Conservative hold | | Swing | | |

Ambrosden
| Party | Candidate | Votes | % | ±% |
|---|---|---|---|---|
| Conservative | David Markham | 331 | 63.4 | |
| Liberal Democrats | Claire Brown | 191 | 36.6 | |
| Majority | | 140 | 26.8 | |
| Turnout | | 522 | 19.4 | |
| Conservative hold | | Swing | | |

Ardley
| Party | Candidate | Votes | % | ±% |
|---|---|---|---|---|
| Conservative | Catharine Fulljames | 454 | 80.5 | |
| Liberal Democrats | Ralph Rookwood | 110 | 19.5 | |
| Majority | | 354 | 61.0 | |
| Turnout | | 564 | 21.6 | |
| Conservative hold | | Swing | | |

Bicester East
| Party | Candidate | Votes | % | ±% |
|---|---|---|---|---|
| Conservative | Rose Stratford | 1,073 | 50.8 | |
| Labour | John Hanna | 667 | 31.6 | |
| Liberal Democrats | Elizabeth Yardley | 374 | 17.7 | |
| Majority | | 406 | 19.2 | |
| Turnout | | 2,114 | 27.4 | |
| Conservative gain from Labour | | Swing | | |

Bicester South
| Party | Candidate | Votes | % | ±% |
|---|---|---|---|---|
| Conservative | Diana Edwards | 483 | 61.4 | |
| Labour | Di Pettifer | 304 | 38.6 | |
| Majority | | 179 | 22.8 | |
| Turnout | | 787 | 24.7 | |

Bicester West
| Party | Candidate | Votes | % | ±% |
|---|---|---|---|---|
| Conservative | Norman Bolster | 1,130 | 47.4 | |
| Labour | Les Sibley | 937 | 39.3 | |
| Liberal Democrats | Kay Brown | 315 | 13.2 | |
| Majority | | 193 | 8.1 | |
| Turnout | | 2,382 | 30.9 | |

Bodicote
| Party | Candidate | Votes | % | ±% |
|---|---|---|---|---|
| Conservative | Ann Graham | 534 | 65.8 | |
| Liberal Democrats | Peter Davis | 277 | 34.2 | |
| Majority | | 257 | 31.6 | |
| Turnout | | 811 | 47.9 | |
| Conservative hold | | Swing | | |

Calthorpe
| Party | Candidate | Votes | % | ±% |
|---|---|---|---|---|
| Conservative | Elizabeth Macleod | 853 | 60.5 | |
| Labour | Roy Mold | 379 | 26.9 | |
| Liberal Democrats | Geoffrey Fisher | 179 | 12.7 | |
| Majority | | 474 | 33.6 | |
| Turnout | | 1,411 | 20.2 | |

Easington
| Party | Candidate | Votes | % | ±% |
|---|---|---|---|---|
| Conservative | Hilary Smith | 952 | 59.2 | |
| Liberal Democrats | Daphne Nash | 423 | 26.3 | |
| Labour | Andrew Beere | 232 | 14.4 | |
| Majority | | 529 | 32.9 | |
| Turnout | | 1,607 | 31.7 | |
| Conservative gain from Liberal Democrats | | Swing | | |

Gosford
| Party | Candidate | Votes | % | ±% |
|---|---|---|---|---|
| Conservative | Maurice Billington | 230 | 46.6 | |
| Liberal Democrats | Anne Parsley | 218 | 44.1 | |
| Labour | Joyce Ruiz | 46 | 9.3 | |
| Majority | | 12 | 2.5 | |
| Turnout | | 494 | 47.7 | |
| Conservative hold | | Swing | | |

Grimsbury
| Party | Candidate | Votes | % | ±% |
|---|---|---|---|---|
| Labour | Sandra Mold | 644 | 53.1 | |
| Conservative | Thomas Greeves | 568 | 46.9 | |
| Majority | | 76 | 6.2 | |
| Turnout | | 1,212 | 18.4 | |
| Labour hold | | Swing | | |

Hardwick
| Party | Candidate | Votes | % | ±% |
|---|---|---|---|---|
| Conservative | Elsie Milne | 617 | 61.5 | |
| Labour | Balbiz Dhesi | 387 | 38.5 | |
| Majority | | 230 | 23.0 | |
| Turnout | | 1,004 | 19.1 | |
| Conservative hold | | Swing | | |

Hornton
| Party | Candidate | Votes | % | ±% |
|---|---|---|---|---|
| Conservative | Lorna Mansell | 231 | 54.9 | |
| Labour | Elizabeth Gatliff | 135 | 32.1 | |
| Liberal Democrats | Mervyn Probert | 55 | 13.1 | |
| Majority | | 96 | 22.8 | |
| Turnout | | 421 | 40.7 | |
| Conservative hold | | Swing | | |

Kidlington North West
| Party | Candidate | Votes | % | ±% |
|---|---|---|---|---|
| Liberal Democrats | Christopher Pack | 852 | 60.2 | |
| Labour | Andrew Hornsby-Smith | 564 | 39.8 | |
| Majority | | 288 | 20.4 | |
| Turnout | | 1,416 | 31.1 | |
| Liberal Democrats gain from Labour | | Swing | | |

Kidlington South East
| Party | Candidate | Votes | % | ±% |
|---|---|---|---|---|
| Conservative | Mary Young | 533 | 42.8 | |
| Labour | Anthony Chinn | 435 | 34.9 | |
| Liberal Democrats | Devena Rae | 277 | 22.2 | |
| Majority | | 98 | 7.9 | |
| Turnout | | 1,245 | 28.2 | |

Launton
| Party | Candidate | Votes | % | ±% |
|---|---|---|---|---|
| Conservative | William Evans | 474 | 80.7 | |
| Liberal Democrats | Derek Turner | 113 | 19.3 | |
| Majority | | 361 | 61.4 | |
| Turnout | | 587 | 34.9 | |
| Conservative hold | | Swing | | |

Neithrop
| Party | Candidate | Votes | % | ±% |
|---|---|---|---|---|
| Labour | Richard Doy | 470 | 58.1 | |
| Conservative | Christopher Mills | 339 | 41.9 | |
| Majority | | 131 | 16.2 | |
| Turnout | | 809 | 11.5 | |
| Labour hold | | Swing | | |

Ruscote
| Party | Candidate | Votes | % | ±% |
|---|---|---|---|---|
| Conservative | Keith Strangwood | 456 | 47.8 | |
| Labour | Wendy Humphries | 387 | 40.6 | |
| Liberal Democrats | Anthony Burns | 110 | 11.5 | |
| Majority | | 69 | 7.2 | |
| Turnout | | 953 | 53.0 | |
| Conservative gain from Labour | | Swing | | |
