= 2008 Cherwell District Council election =

2008 UK local government election

Results of the 2008 Cherwell District Council election

The 2008 Cherwell District Council election took place on 1 May 2008 to elect members of Cherwell District Council in Oxfordshire, England. One third of the council was up for election and the Conservative Party stayed in overall control of the council.

The results saw the Conservatives win all of the seats that were contested in the election in a clean sweep. They gained 2 seats from Labour to have 44 of the 50 seats on the council, while the Liberal Democrats were not defending any seats in the election. In Banbury Neithrop ward, Martin Weir, a former Labour Party member who joined the Conservatives earlier in the year, defeated his former colleague and mayor Surinder Dhesi to take the seat. The other gain came in Banbury Ruscote, with the defeats for Labour being blamed on the national political situation. The results meant that Labour were reduced to holding only 2 seats on the council behind the Liberal Democrats on 4.

After the election, the composition of the council was:

- Conservative 44
- Liberal Democrat 4
- Labour 2

== Election result ==
Cherwell local election result 2008
Party	Seats	Gains	Losses	Net gain/loss	Seats %	Votes %	Votes	+/−
Conservative	18	2	0	+2	100.0	67.0	16,341	+10.0
Labour	0	0	2	-2	0.0	19.0	4,637	+0.1
Liberal Democrats	0	0	0	0	0.0	14.0	3,420	-6.5

== Ward results ==
Adderbury
Party	Candidate	Votes	%	±%
Conservative	Rick Atkinson	682	75.1	+13.7
Liberal Democrats	Elisabeth Yardley	226	24.9	−13.7
Majority		456	50.2	+27.4
Turnout		908	39.0	
Conservative hold		Swing		

Banbury Calthorpe
Party	Candidate	Votes	%	±%
Conservative	Alastair Milne Home	884	75.9	+11.1
Labour	Mary Ross	280	24.1	+2.5
Majority		604	51.8	+8.6
Turnout		1,164	28.0	
Conservative hold		Swing		

Banbury Easington
Party	Candidate	Votes	%	±%
Conservative	Fred Blackwell	1,534	77.9	+16.8
Labour	Roy Mold	435	22.1	+2.6
Majority		1,099	55.8	+14.2
Turnout		1,969	33.7	−1.0
Conservative hold		Swing		

Banbury Grimsbury & Castle
Party	Candidate	Votes	%	±%
Conservative	Ann Bonner	1,075	62.0	+0.3
Labour	Henry Goodman	495	28.6	−9.7
Liberal Democrats	Martin Chadwick	163	9.4	+9.4
Majority		580	33.4	+10.0
Turnout		1,733	24.5	−1.0
Conservative hold		Swing		

Banbury Hardwick (2)
Party	Candidate	Votes	%	±%
Conservative	John Donaldson	975		
Conservative	Anthony Ilott	836		
Labour	Sean Woodcock	281		
Labour	Sandra Mold	260		
Liberal Democrats	Anthony Burns	233		
Turnout		2,585	24.2	+0.2
Conservative hold		Swing		
Conservative hold		Swing		

Banbury Neithrop
Party	Candidate	Votes	%	±%
Conservative	Martin Weir	700	56.1	+6.6
Labour	Surinder Dhesi	548	43.9	+11.8
Majority		152	12.2	−5.2
Turnout		1,248	28.8	
Conservative gain from Labour		Swing		

Banbury Ruscote
Party	Candidate	Votes	%	±%
Conservative	Patricia Tompson	751	52.0	+2.9
Labour	Patrick Cartledge	694	48.0	+11.4
Majority		57	4.0	−8.5
Turnout		1,445	25.3	−1.7
Conservative gain from Labour		Swing		

Bicester East
Party	Candidate	Votes	%	±%
Conservative	Lawrie Stratford	877	70.3	+10.1
Labour	Chris Bream	208	16.7	−8.1
Liberal Democrats	Bruce Shakespeare	163	13.1	−1.9
Majority		669	53.6	+18.2
Turnout		1,248	28.3	−1.2
Conservative hold		Swing		

Bicester North
Party	Candidate	Votes	%	±%
Conservative	Nicholas Mawer	939	73.2	+2.2
Liberal Democrats	Steve Creed	178	13.9	−1.2
Labour	John Darbyshire	165	12.9	−1.0
Majority		761	59.3	+3.4
Turnout		1,282	26.7	+1.2
Conservative hold		Swing		

Bicester South
Party	Candidate	Votes	%	±%
Conservative	Dan Sames	827	60.1	+10.1
Liberal Democrats	Neil Walton	548	39.9	−10.1
Majority		279	20.2	
Turnout		1,375	37.4	+5.1
Conservative hold		Swing		

Bicester Town
Party	Candidate	Votes	%	±%
Conservative	Debbie Pickford	774	65.5	+7.0
Labour	Mary Lynch	209	17.7	−5.4
Liberal Democrats	John Willett	199	16.8	−1.6
Majority		565	47.8	+12.4
Turnout		1,182	30.5	+0.2
Conservative hold		Swing		

Bicester West
Party	Candidate	Votes	%	±%
Conservative	Russell Hurle	1,175	68.0	+21.0
Labour	John Broad	553	32.0	−21.0
Majority		622	36.0	
Turnout		1,728	31.1	−5.0
Conservative hold		Swing		

Bloxham & Bodicote
Party	Candidate	Votes	%	±%
Conservative	Lynda Thirzie Smart	1,338	73.4	+2.8
Liberal Democrats	Peter Davis	484	26.6	−2.8
Majority		854	46.8	+5.6
Turnout		1,822	39.7	
Conservative hold		Swing		

Caversfield
Party	Candidate	Votes	%	±%
Conservative	Catherine Fulljames	510	76.9	+5.3
Liberal Democrats	Andy Murray	100	15.1	−13.3
Labour	Alan Hasted	53	8.0	+8.0
Majority		410	61.8	+18.6
Turnout		663	34.9	
Conservative hold		Swing		

Kidlington South
Party	Candidate	Votes	%	±%
Conservative	Maurice Billington	1,369	57.1	+12.8
Liberal Democrats	Doug Williamson	695	29.0	−3.9
Labour	David James	333	13.9	−8.9
Majority		674	28.1	+16.7
Turnout		2,397	38.0	+2.3
Conservative hold		Swing		

Launton
Party	Candidate	Votes	%	±%
Conservative	David Hughes	unopposed		
Conservative hold		Swing		

Yarnton, Gosford & Water Eaton
Party	Candidate	Votes	%	±%
Conservative	Trevor Stevens	1,095	66.4	−3.2
Liberal Democrats	Suzanne Wilson-Higgins	431	26.1	−4.3
Labour	Martin Keighery	123	7.5	+7.5
Majority		664	40.3	+1.1
Turnout		1,649	44.7	+8.2
Conservative hold		Swing		
