= Finmere =

Village in Oxfordshire, England

Coordinates: 51.991°N 1.073°W

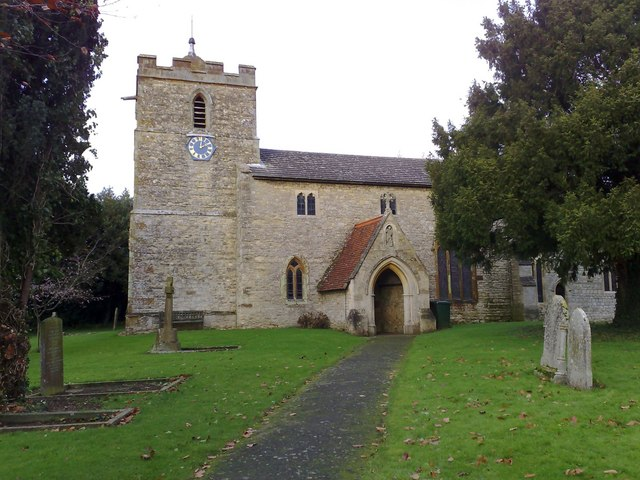
- St Michael & All Angels parish church

- Location within Oxfordshire
- Area: 6.35 km^{2} (2.45 sq mi)
- Population: 466 (2011 census)
  - Density: 73/km^{2} (190/sq mi)
- OS grid reference: SP6332
- Civil parish: Finmere
- District: Cherwell
- Shire county: Oxfordshire
- Region: South East
- Country: England
- Sovereign state: United Kingdom
- Post town: Buckingham
- Postcode district: MK18
- Dialling code: 01280
- Police: Thames Valley
- Fire: Oxfordshire
- Ambulance: South Central
- UK Parliament: Bicester and Woodstock
- Website: Finmere Parish Council

Finmere is a village and civil parish in Oxfordshire, south of the River Great Ouse. It is on the county boundary with Buckinghamshire, almost 4 miles (6 km) west of Buckingham and just over 4 miles (6 km) east of Brackley in Northamptonshire. The 2011 census recorded the parish's population as 466.

== Archaeology ==
In 2000 archaeologists found evidence of Bronze Age, Iron Age and Roman activity in Finmere Quarry about 3/4 mile (1.2 km) west of the village. Five early Bronze Age cremation pits were excavated, and from one pit two collared urns were recovered. The cremations were dated to about 2040 to 1880 BC.

The site of a late Iron Age settlement was found west of the cremation pits and just east of the trackbed of the former Great Central Main Line railway. The settlement consisted originally of a number of roundhouses packed close together in a straight line, and then developed in phases with later structures overlapping the sites of some of the earlier ones. Enclosures, presumably to contain livestock, were created at different times and in different shapes, with the outlines of some enclosures from different periods overlapping the sites of the roundhouses and each other. Iron Age pottery recovered from the site suggests that the settlement was occupied in phases from the 4th to the 1st century BC.

A pair of ditches were found running parallel across the site about 4.5 metres (15 ft) apart and roughly east–west. The ditches were identified as flanking a track, and fragments of wheel-thrown pottery found on part of the site led to the track being dated to the period of Roman occupation of Britain. The site is about 0.8 miles (1.3 km) from the course of the Roman road that linked Alchester near Bicester with Lactodurum (now Towcester), which runs through the eastern side of Finmere village.

== Manor ==
Finmere's toponym is derived from the Old English for "pool frequented by woodpeckers". The village includes the hamlet of Little Tingewick.

Before and after the Norman Conquest of England Wulfward the White, a thegn of King Edward the Confessor's Queen Edith, owned the Manor of Finmere. However, by 1086 William of Normandy had granted the manor to Geoffrey de Montbray, who was Bishop of Coutances but also one of William's senior military commanders. Subsequently, the manor passed to the Earls of Gloucester, in whose family it stayed until the 4th Earl of Gloucester died without a successor in 1314. In 1347 the manor passed to the 1st Earl of Stafford, in whose family it then remained.

== Parish church ==
Finmere had a parish church by 1189, when its advowson was granted to the Augustinian Friary in Bristol. The only surviving remnant from the parish church of that period seems to be the 12th century font. The earliest surviving parts of the present Church of England parish church of St Michael and All Angels are the tower, the north wall of the chancel and the Decorated Gothic windows in the chancel and the south wall of the nave. The Perpendicular Gothic clerestory was added later. The church underwent major repairs at various times in the 17th, 18th and 19th centuries. A west gallery was added, probably in the 1760s. In 1856–58 the Gothic Revival architect G.E. Street removed the west gallery, restored the church, widened the chancel arch and added the north aisle. A vestry was added in 1868 and a porch in 1876. The architectural historians Sir Nikolaus Pevsner and Jennifer Sherwood criticised Street's alterations for being "too aggressive" and dominating the rest of the building.

St. Michael's bell tower has three bells. William Chamberlain of Aldgate cast the tenor in about 1470 and an unidentified bellfounder cast the treble in about 1599. The middle bell is of unknown age but Lester and Pack of the Whitechapel Bell Foundry recast it in 1754.

The tower has also an historic turret clock that was installed in 1697. 22 donors between them raised the £8 10s 0d cost. The clock was altered with a new escapement and other alterations in 1858 and reinstalled in 1859. Dr James Clarke of Finmere House designed the escapement and paid the £10 cost of reinstallation, which was done by William Bayliss, the village carpenter.

The Church of England parish is now a member of the Benefice of Shelswell, which includes the parishes of Cottisford, Fringford, Godington, Hardwick-cum-Tusmore, Hethe, Mixbury, Newton Purcell, Stoke Lyne and Stratton Audley.

== Social and economic history ==
The Domesday Book records that by 1086 the village had a watermill. The village continued to have a mill on the Great Ouse until early in the 19th century, when Richard Temple-Grenville, 1st Duke of Buckingham and Chandos had it demolished.

In 1645 during the English Civil War a Parliamentarian force from Newport Pagnell surprised a platoon of eighteen Royalists stationed in Finmere. The Parliamentarians drove the Royalists out of the village, which thereafter remained under Parliamentarian control.

An open field system of farming predominated in the parish until 1667, when the common fields were enclosed.

At an unrecorded date prior to the Enclosure act, a field of approx. 12 acres had been set aside for the use of the Poor of the village. It is known as the Poor's Plot and, as of 2023, still exists and income from the plot partly funds the village allotments.

In 1824 the 1st Duke of Buckingham and Chandos built a National School for the village. In 1926 it was reorganised as a junior school, with senior pupils thereafter going to the school in Fringford. The first Finmere school was closed in 1948. A new school was built and opened in 1959.

== Historic houses ==
Finmere rectory has had a chequered history. In 1634 it was a relatively small house of only four bays. Thereafter it was enlarged to ten bays, but in 1662 a violent storm blew it down. The rector had it rebuilt as a house of only five bays, but that burnt down in 1668. By 1685 the rectory consisted of only three bays, but by 1738 it had been enlarged to six. Also in the 18th century "Capability" Brown designed its gardens. No trace of Brown's work survives, and in 1867 the house was demolished and replaced with a new rectory. This is now a private house, Finmere Place.

Other historic houses in Finmere include Finmere House (built in 1600 and re-fronted in 1739) and Lepper's House (built in 1638 and rebuilt in 1879).

== Transport ==
Finmere was on the main road between Buckingham and Banbury, which was made into a turnpike by an Act of Parliament in 1744. Since the 1920s the road has been classified as the A421, and later in the 20th century a bypass was built past the former RAF Finmere airfield, south of Finmere and the neighbouring Buckinghamshire village of Tingewick, to take the A421 past the two villages.

In 1847–50 the Buckinghamshire Railway built a branch line to Banbury Merton Street through the northern part of the parish along the Great Ouse Valley. Fulwell & Westbury station was built on the line about 1.5 miles (2.4 km) northwest of the village. In 1899 the Great Central Railway built its main line to London through the western part of the parish and built Finmere for Buckingham station about 1 mile (1.6 km) south of the village. Buckingham already had a railway station on the Banbury to Verney Junction Branch Line and was almost 5 miles (8 km) from the Great Central station, so the name was subsequently shortened to the more appropriate "Finmere". British Railways closed Finmere station in 1963, and closed the section of the Great Central line through the station in 1966. BR also closed Fulwell and Westbury station and the branch line to Banbury in the 1960s.

== RAF Finmere ==
The War Department built a military airfield south of Finmere and Tingewick in 1941–42, which was commissioned in July 1942 as RAF Finmere. It served as a Bomber Command operational training unit, flying Bristol Blenheim medium bombers which by then were obsolete for combat operations and used only for training. They were eventually withdrawn from this role as well and from January 1944 the training unit at RAF Finmere flew de Havilland Mosquitoes. After the Second World War RAF Finmere served as a Transport Command storage depot until the 1950s, when it was decommissioned and closed as an RAF base. Part of one runway remains in use as a private airfield.

Since 1973 a Sunday market has been held on the area where the three concrete runways converge. Initially Buckinghamshire County Council opposed the market and had the operators convicted and fined for breaking the Shops Act 1950 that forbade most forms of retailing in England and Wales on Sundays. In 1974 Britain's local government reorganisation transferred responsibility for planning to Aylesbury Vale District Council, which in 1975 granted the market planning permission for three years and in 1976 extended that permission until 1981. In 1994 Parliament adopted the Sunday Trading Act which greatly reduced restrictions on Sunday retailing in England and Wales, and since then Finmere Market has been less busy. However, the former airfield is now also the venue of the annual Bicester Sheep Fair.

On 2 April 1992 a US Air Force plane crashed near Finmere. There were no fatalities or casualties. It was speculated that the plane was attempting to make an emergency landing at the disused airfield at Finmere.

== Amenities ==
The parish has a thatched 17th- or 18th-century public house, the Red Lion at Little Tingewick. It is now a gastropub.

There is a village hall and playing fields at the north end of Finmere village.

== Sources and further reading ==
- Beeson, CFC (1989) [1962]. Simcock, AV (ed.). Clockmaking in Oxfordshire 1400–1850 (3rd ed.). Oxford: Museum of the History of Science. pp. 37–38. ISBN 0-903364-06-9.
- Blomfield, James Charles (1998) [1887]. History of Finmere. Finmere: Finmere and Little Tingewick Historical Society.
- Hart, Jonathan; Kenyon, David; Mudd, Andrew (2010). "Excavation of Early Bronze Age Cremations and a Later Iron Age Settlement at Finmere Quarry, North-East Oxfordshire". Oxoniensia. LXXV. Oxfordshire Architectural and Historical Society: 97–132. ISSN 0308-5562.
- Lobel, Mary D, ed. (1959). A History of the County of Oxford. Victoria County History. Vol. 6: Ploughley Hundred. London: Oxford University Press for the Institute of Historical Research. pp. 116–125.
- Sherwood, Jennifer; Pevsner, Nikolaus (1974). Oxfordshire. The Buildings of England. Harmondsworth: Penguin Books. pp. 604–605. ISBN 978-0-14-071045-8.
