= List of places called Newton in the United Kingdom =

Places in the United Kingdom having "Newton" in their name include:

== England ==
=== Cheshire ===
- Newton, Chester, Cheshire
- Newton, a hamlet in Kingsley, Cheshire, near Frodsham
- Newton, a hamlet in Middlewich, Cheshire
- Newton, a hamlet in Mottram St Andrew, Cheshire, near Prestbury
- Newton by Daresbury, in Daresbury, Cheshire
- Newton by Malpas, Cheshire
- Newton-by-Tattenhall, Cheshire

=== Cumbria ===
- Newton Arlosh, Cumbria
- Newton-in-Furness, Cumbria
- High Newton, a village in Lindale and Newton-in-Cartmel, Cumbria
- Low Newton, Cumbria

=== Derbyshire ===
- Newton, Derbyshire
- Newton Grange, Derbyshire
- Newton Solney, Derbyshire
- Kings Newton, Derbyshire

=== Devon ===
- Newton Abbot, Devon
- Newton Ferrers, Devon
- Newton Poppleford, Devon
- Newton St Cyres, Devon
- Newton St Petrock, Devon
- Newton Tracey, Devon

=== County Durham ===
- Newton Aycliffe, County Durham
- Archdeacon Newton, County Durham
- Longnewton, County Durham

=== Herefordshire ===
- Newton, a hamlet in Clifford, Herefordshire
- Newton, Golden Valley, Herefordshire
- Newton, Hampton Court, Herefordshire
- Walford, Letton and Newton, Herefordshire

=== Lancashire ===
- Newton, Fylde, Lancashire
- Newton, Lancaster, Lancashire
- Newton-in-Bowland, Lancashire
- Newton-with-Clifton, Lancashire
- Newton-with-Scales, Lancashire
- Hardhorn with Newton, Lancashire

=== Leicestershire ===
- Newton Burgoland, Leicestershire
- Newton Harcourt, Leicestershire
- Cold Newton, Leicestershire

=== Lincolnshire ===
- Newton, Lincolnshire
- Newton on Trent, Lincolnshire
- Toft Newton, Lincolnshire
- Wold Newton, Lincolnshire

=== Norfolk ===
- Newton, Norfolk
- Newton by Castle Acre, Norfolk
- Newton St Faith, a village in Horsham St Faith and Newton St Faith, Norfolk
- West Newton, Norfolk

=== Northamptonshire ===
- Newton, Northamptonshire (sometimes called Newton in the Willows)
- Newton Bromswold, Northamptonshire
- Woodnewton, Northamptonshire

=== Northumberland ===
- Newton, Northumberland, in Bywell parish
- Newton-by-the-Sea, Northumberland, a civil parish
- Newton on the Moor, Northumberland

=== Nottinghamshire ===
- Newton, Nottinghamshire
  - RAF Newton, Nottinghamshire
- Newton Town, a locality in Mansfield, Nottinghamshire

=== Shropshire ===
- Newton, Shropshire, an area of Craven Arms
- Newton Mere, a lake in Welshampton and Lyneal, Shropshire
- Newton on the Hill, a hamlet in Myddle, Broughton and Harmer Hill, Shropshire

=== Somerset ===
- Newton St Loe, Somerset
- Newton, a hamlet in Bicknoller, Somerset
- North Newton, a village in North Petherton, Somerset
- West Newton, a hamlet in North Petherton, Somerset

=== Wiltshire ===
- Newton, a hamlet in Whiteparish, Wiltshire
- Newton Tony, Wiltshire
- South Newton, Wiltshire

=== East Riding of Yorkshire ===
- East Newton, a hamlet in Aldbrough, East Riding of Yorkshire
- Out Newton, East Riding of Yorkshire
- West Newton, a hamlet in Burton Constable, East Riding of Yorkshire
- Wold Newton, East Riding of Yorkshire

=== North Yorkshire ===
- Newton-on-Ouse, North Yorkshire
- Newton-on-Rawcliffe, North Yorkshire, in Newton civil parish
- Newton Kyme, North Yorkshire
- Newton Morrell, North Yorkshire
- Newton Mulgrave, North Yorkshire
- Newton-le-Willows, North Yorkshire
- Newton under Roseberry, North Yorkshire
- East Newton, a hamlet in Stonegrave, North Yorkshire

=== Other counties ===
- Newton, a hamlet in Dunton, Bedfordshire
- Newton Bromswold, Bedfordshire
- Newton Blossomville, Buckinghamshire
- Newton Longville, Buckinghamshire
- Newton, South Cambridgeshire, Cambridgeshire
- Newton-in-the-Isle, Isle of Ely, Cambridgeshire
- Newton, Cornwall
- Newton Ferrers, a locality in St Mellion, Cornwall
- Maiden Newton, Dorset
- Sturminster Newton, Dorset
- Newton, South Gloucestershire, a locality in Rockhampton
- Newton, Greater Manchester, a suburb of Hyde formerly in Cheshire
- Newton Heath (formerly Newton), Greater Manchester
- Newton Stacey, Hampshire
- Newton Valence, Hampshire
- Newton Court, a neighbourhood in Hatfield, Hertfordshire
- Newton-le-Willows, Merseyside
  - Newton (UK Parliament constituency), former constituency formerly in Lancashire
- Newton, Merseyside, on the Wirral
- Newton Morrell, a hamlet in Newton Purcell with Shelswell, Oxfordshire
- Newton Purcell, Oxfordshire
- Newton, a hamlet in Blithfield, Staffordshire
- Newton, Suffolk (also known as Newton Green)
- Old Newton, Suffolk
- Newton, Warwickshire
- Newton Regis, Warwickshire
- Newton, West Midlands, a ward in Sandwell
- Newton, Doncaster, a hamlet in Sproutbrough and Cusworth, South Yorkshire
- Newton, a hamlet in Ledsham, West Yorkshire
- Potternewton, West Yorkshire

== Scotland ==
- Newton, Argyll on the Cowal peninsula, Argyll and Bute
- Newton, Fordyce, a settlement in Fordyce, Aberdeenshire
- Newton, Midlothian near to Danderhall
- Newton, North Uist, Na h-Eileanan an Siar
- Newton, Scottish Borders, part of Nenthorn
- Newton, South Lanarkshire, near to Cambuslang
  - Newton railway station serving the above community
- Newton, West Lothian
- Newton Mearns, East Renfrewshire
- Newton of Ardtoe, Highland
- Newton-on-Ayr railway station, South Ayrshire
- Newton Stewart, Dumfries and Galloway
- Newton Wamphray, Dumfries and Galloway
- Barony of Newton, Stirlingshire
- North Newton, a locality on the Isle of Arran, North Ayrshire
- South Newton, North Ayrshire
- Longnewton, a locality in Ancrum, Scottish Borders
- Newtongrange, Midlothian
- Newtonmore, Highland

== Wales ==
- Newton, Brecknockshire
- Newton, Carew
- Newton, Porthcawl
- Newton, Swansea
- Newton Green
- Manorbier Newton, a hamlet in Manorbier, Pembrokeshire
