= Tingewick Meadows =

Protected area in Buckinghamshire, England

Coordinates: 51.9763°N 1.0522°W

- Site of Special Scientific Interest
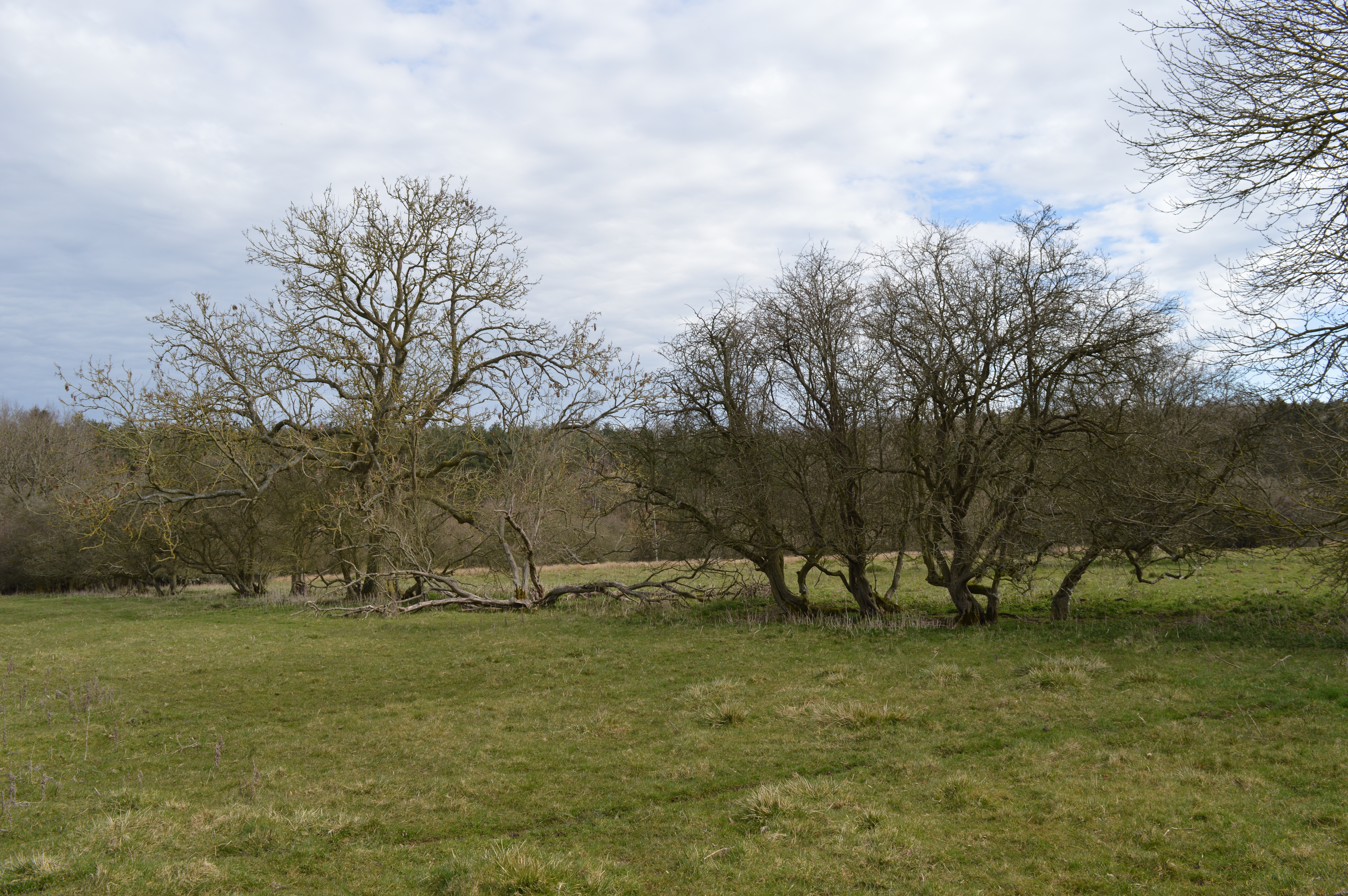
- Location of Tingewick Meadows.
- Area of search: Buckinghamshire
- Grid reference: SP652313
- Interest: Biological
- Area: 11.1 ha (27 acres)
- Notification date: 1984
- Location map: Magic Map

Tingewick Meadows is an 11.1-hectare (27-acre) biological Site of Special Scientific Interest south of Tingewick in Buckinghamshire.

The site is one of the few remaining old meadows in the north of the county. It has two fields which are grazed by horses and cattle. There are areas of ridge and furrow, and of marsh and ditches which are fed by springs. The grassland has a rich variety of plant species, some of which are rare in the Vale of Aylesbury, such as the quaking grass briza media and the dwarf thistle cirsium acaule. The ditches have a wide variety of bryophytes, and the hedges have trees such as ash, oak and hazel.

There is access from the road which goes south from Tingewick towards Barton Hartshorn and Chetwode.
