= Chetwode =

Village in Buckinghamshire, England

Coordinates: 51.960°N 1.066°W

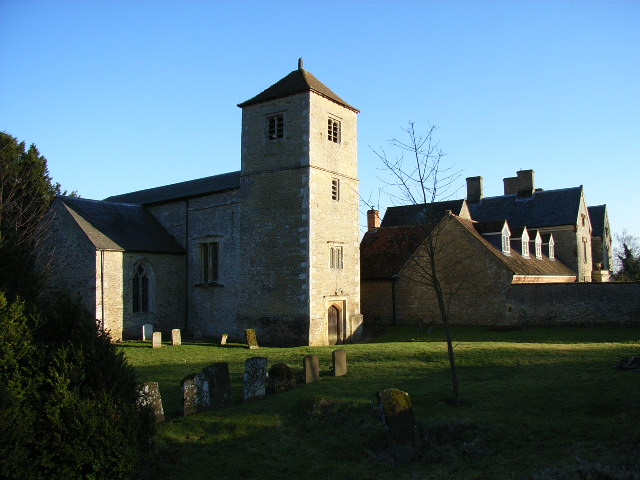
- Church and Priory of SS. Mary and Nicholas

- Location within Buckinghamshire
- Population: 173 (2011 Census including Barton Hartshorn)
- OS grid reference: SP6429
- Civil parish: Chetwode
- Unitary authority: Buckinghamshire
- Ceremonial county: Buckinghamshire
- Region: South East
- Country: England
- Sovereign state: United Kingdom
- Post town: Buckingham
- Postcode district: MK18
- Dialling code: 01280
- Police: Thames Valley
- Fire: Buckinghamshire
- Ambulance: South Central
- UK Parliament: Buckingham and Bletchley

Chetwode (/ˈtʃɛtwʊd/) is a village and civil parish about 4 miles (6.4 km) southwest of Buckingham, in the Buckinghamshire district of the ceremonial county of Buckinghamshire, England. The parish is bounded to the southwest and southeast by a brook called The Birne, which here also forms part of the county boundary with Oxfordshire.

== Etymology ==
The name Chetwode is first attested in a charter of 949 (preserved in a seventeenth-century copy) as Cetwuda, and then in the Domesday Book of 1086 as Ceteode. The first part of the name comes from the Brittonic word corresponding to modern Welsh coed ('wood'), expanded with the Old English word wudu, of the same meaning.

== Manor ==
There is a manor at Chetwode that stayed in the same family from the time of the Domesday Book in 1086 through to the 1960s. The Domesday Book records that in 1086 Robert de Thain held the manor from Odo, Bishop of Bayeux.

== Priory and parish church ==
In 1244 Sir Ralphe de Norwich founded an Augustinian priory at Chetwode. In 1460, owing to its poverty, the priory was dissolved and annexed to the nearby Notley Abbey (or "Nutley" Abbey) in Long Crendon. This led to the first recognition of Chetwode as a village rather than just a priory.

The Church of England parish church of Saint Mary and Saint Nicholas was once part of the Augustinian priory church. However the parish church had become ruinous in the 15th century and this building replaced it as the parish church in 1480. The stonework is a fine example of the work of the 13th century, particularly the sedilia, the east window of five lancets and the triple-lancet window on the south side, with stained glass of the 13th and 14th centuries. The 14th century north chapel later became the manor pew.

A plan of the arrangements of the church and priory cloister in the 16th-century shows the development of Priory House.

== Economic history ==
The parish's common lands were enclosed by an Act of Parliament passed in 1812.

In 1899 the Great Central Railway opened its main line to London through the southwestern part of the parish. The nearest station was Finmere for Buckingham, which was just over the Oxfordshire county boundary on the main road between Buckingham and Bicester and just over 1 mile (1.6 km) from Chetwode. The station was 5 miles (8 km) from Buckingham, more than 1 mile (1.6 km) from Finmere and was actually in Shelswell parish next to the village of Newton Purcell. In about 1922 the Great Central renamed the station Finmere. British Railways closed the station in 1963 and the line in 1966.

The route of High Speed 2 follows the old Great Central line route through the parish.

== See also ==
- List of English abbeys, priories and friaries serving as parish churches

== Sources and further reading ==
- Betjeman, John (1968). Collins Pocket Guide to English Parish Churches. Vol. The South. London: Collins. p. 126.
- Page, W.H., ed. (1905). A History of the County of Buckingham. Victoria County History. Vol. 1. Westminster: Archibald Constable & Co. pp. 380–381.
- Page, W.H., ed. (1927). A History of the County of Buckingham. Victoria County History. Vol. 4. pp. 163–168.
- Pevsner, Nikolaus (1973) [1966]. Buckinghamshire. The Buildings of England. Harmondsworth: Penguin Books. pp. 92–93. ISBN 0-14-071019-1.
