= Newton, Brecknockshire =

Coordinates: 51.9119°N 3.2869°W

Newton (Welsh name Trenewydd) is a hamlet located between the market town of Brecon and the village of Llansantffraed, mid Wales, on the A40 road. It was the birthplace of the poet Henry Vaughan and his clergyman brother Thomas Vaughan (philosopher).
