= RAF Finmere =

Former RAF base in Buckinghamshire, England

RAF Finmere
- Near Finmere, Oxfordshire in England
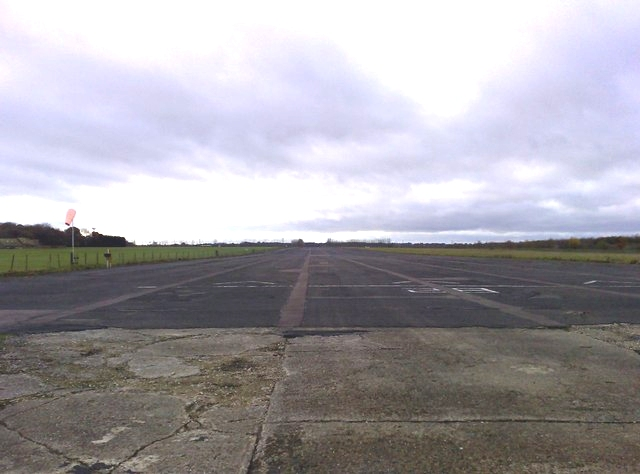
- The threshold of the main runway

Site information
- Type: Royal Air Force satellite station
- Code: FI
- Owner: Air Ministry
- Operator: Royal Air Force
- Controlled by: RAF Fighter Command * No. 9 Group RAF * No. 12 Group RAF; RAF Bomber Command * No. 92 (OTU) Group RAF; RAF Flying Training Command 1943-

Location
- Shown within Buckinghamshire RAF Finmere (the United Kingdom)
- Coordinates: 51°59′08″N 001°04′02″W

Site history
- Built: 1941/42
- In use: August 1942 – July 1945
- Battles/wars: European theatre of World War II

Airfield information
- Elevation: 119 metres (390 ft) AMSL
Runways
Direction	Length and surface
04/22	Concrete
10/28	Concrete
16/34	Concrete

Royal Air Force Finmere or more simply RAF Finmere is a former Royal Air Force satellite station located to the south-east of Finmere and south of Tingewick, a few miles west of Buckingham. Whilst the village of Finmere is in Oxfordshire, the whole of RAF Finmere was located within the north-west corner of Buckinghamshire. It was served by the nearby Finmere railway station.

== Layout ==
RAF Finmere consisted of three concrete runways, radiating from two adjacent points in the north-west corner of the site, with twenty-seven hardstandings and two hangars (types B1 and T2).

== History ==
=== Second World War ===
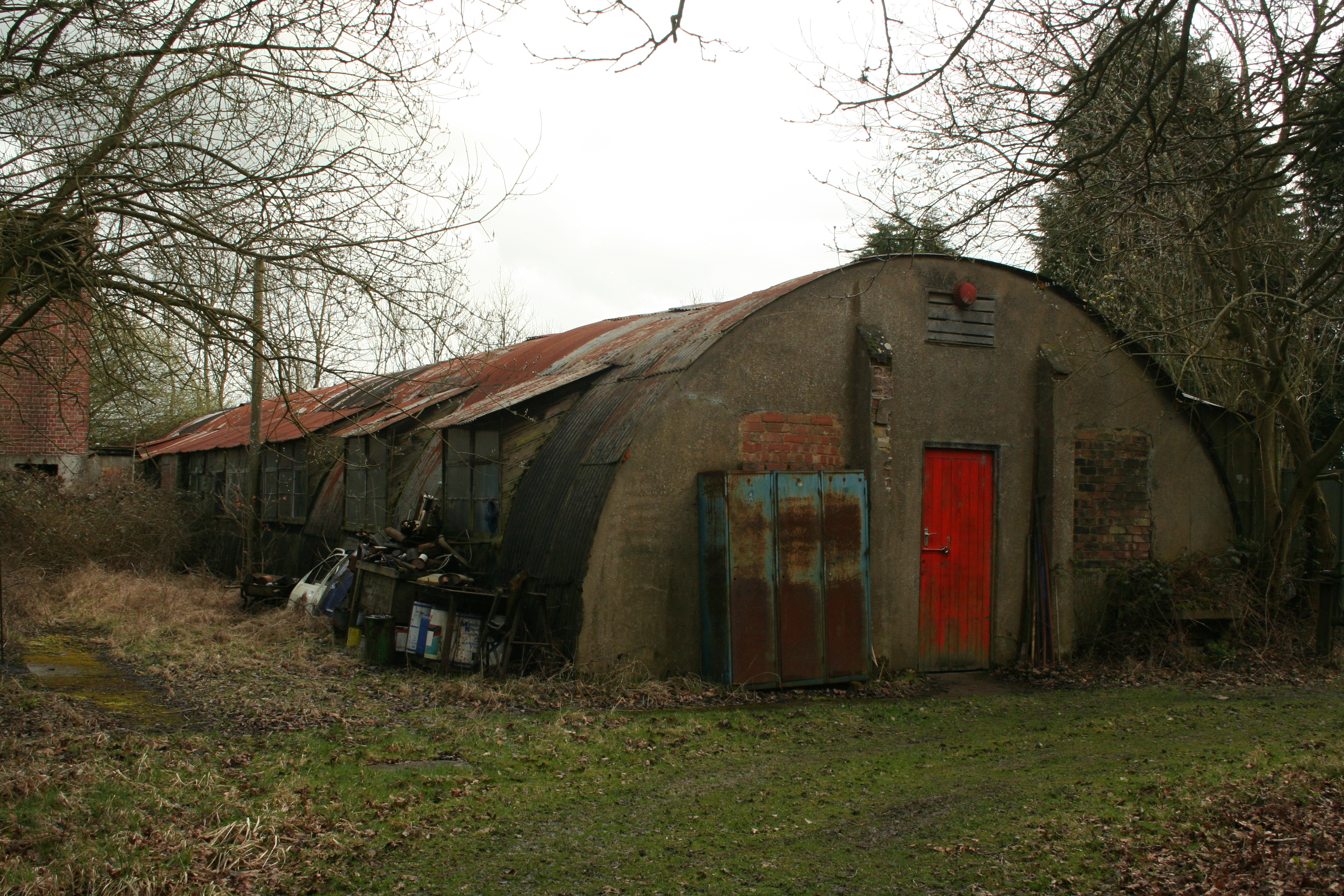
A derelict Nissen hut, formerly used as a communal building

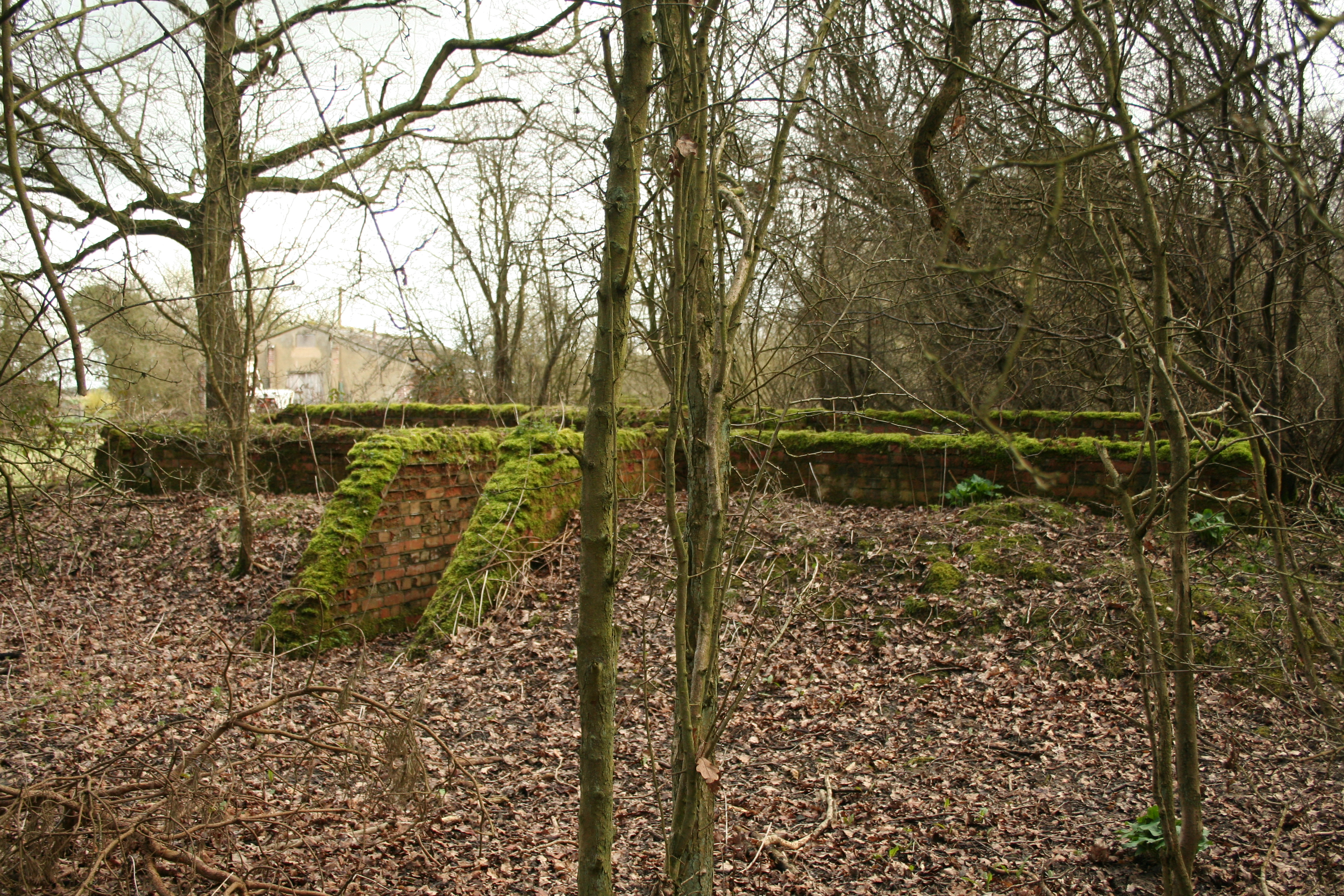
Remains of the blast pens

Built by the Air Ministry in 1941–42, it was commissioned by the RAF in July 1942 as a satellite to nearby RAF Bicester, which was an all-grass airfield and proved unserviceable during wet winter periods. No. 13 Operational Training Unit RAF moved to Finmere, bringing with them Bristol Blenheim Mk1 (short-nose) and Mk4 (long-nose) bombers. By the time of the arrival in 1943 of the similarly equipped No. 307 Ferry Training Unit RAF (FTU), formed at RAF Bicester in late 1942 to train pilots to ferry aircraft to northwest Africa, No. 13 OTU had moved onto the American Douglas A-20 Boston and North American B-25 Mitchell, much heavier aeroplanes with tricycle undercarriage. The arrival of these aircraft meant that Finmere quickly eclipsed its parent station at Bicester in terms of operational importance, as they could not land at Bicester. The arrival of No. 307 FTU also aided its pilots' conversion to the more modern types, as they had the opportunity to fly them back-to-back with their own Blenheims. There were also occasional visits from Supermarine Spitfires and Hawker Tempests from the Fighter Affiliation Flight at Bicester, training bomber crews in retaliation and avoidance of enemy fighters. 1944 saw No. 13 OTU convert to the de Havilland Mosquito: over the next years, Finmere became a major centre for Mosquito aircrew training with almost fifty airframes available, turning out thirty trained crews per month for the war in the Far East. This was pre-empted by the atomic bombings of Hiroshima and Nagasaki.

The following units were also here at some point:

- No. 14 Personnel Transit Centre
- No. 60 OTU
- No. 282 MU
- No. 421 Repair & Salvage Unit
- No. 1473 (Special Duties) Flight RAF
- No. 1655 Mosquito Training Unit RAF

=== Post-war and up to the present day ===
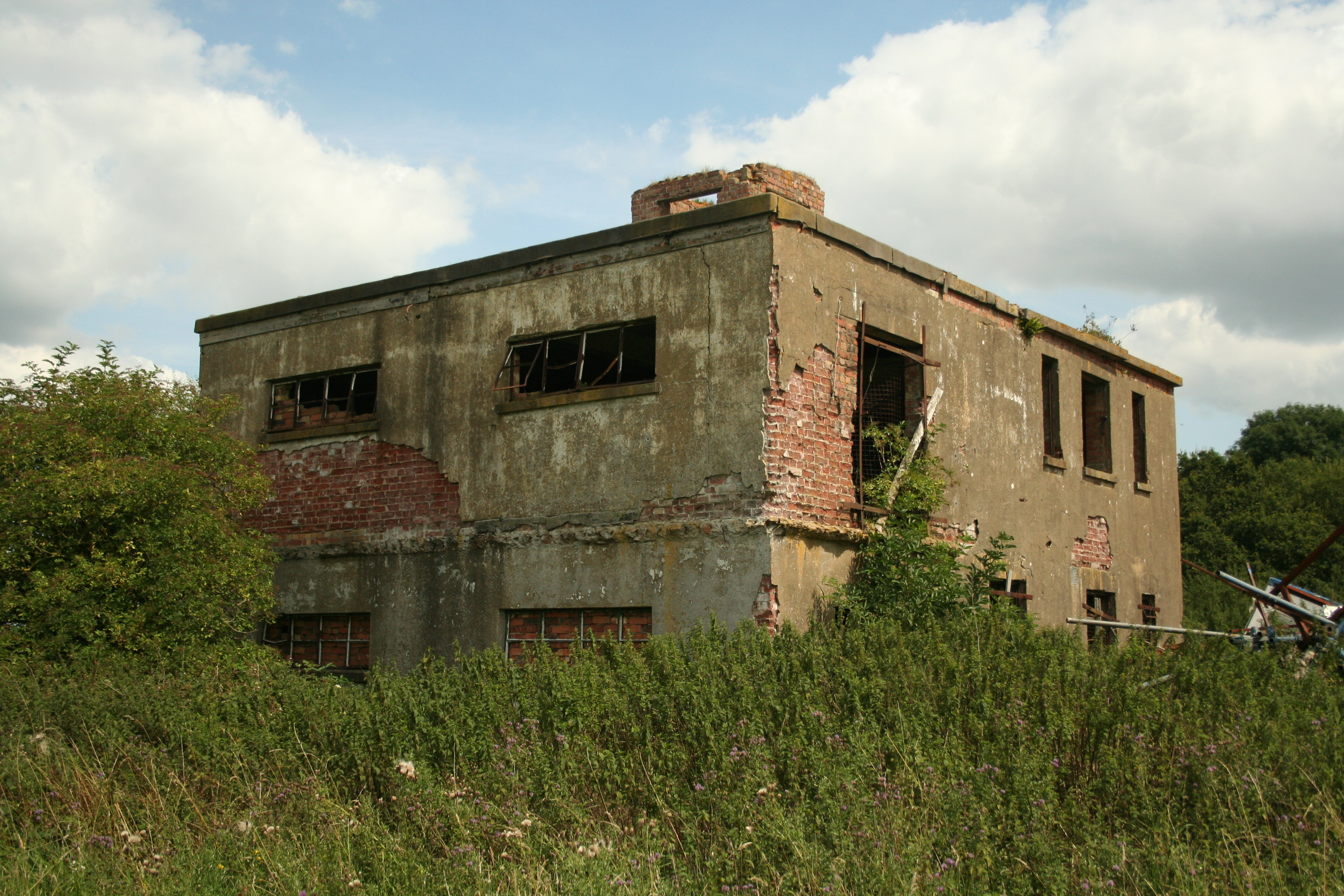
The derelict former control tower

After the sudden end of the Second World War, Finmere was used to store large amounts of surplus ammunition, but was emptied and closed in the summer of 1945. The hangars survive in good condition and are used for light industry/agriculture, but all other surviving buildings are in an advanced state of decay: the former control tower is surrounded by scrap metal. The main east–west runway survives in its entirety, but only half of its length (the eastern half) is in usable condition. Of the other two, less than a quarter of the length of the western runway survives, the rest now just being grass, while two-fifths of the eastern runway survives, albeit in unusable condition. The bottom two-fifths are now covered by trees, with the middle fifth being laid to grass.

The runway was used as the filming location for the plane crash scene in the James Bond film You Only Live Twice. The site became known for its Sunday market which started in 1973, which gained local notoriety for breaking Sunday trading laws.

The Tingewick bypass re-routed a section of the A421 through the northern perimeter road in 1998.
