= Mixbury =

Village in Oxfordshire, England

Coordinates: 52.004°N 1.114°W

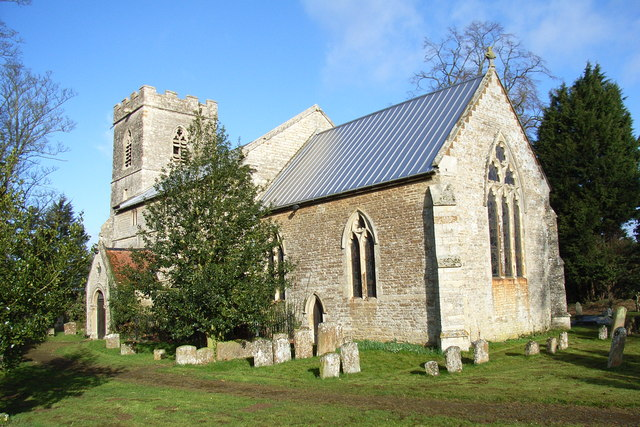
- All Saints' parish church

- Location within Oxfordshire
- Area: 15.38 km^{2} (5.94 sq mi)
- Population: 370 (including civil parish of Newton Purcell with Shelswell as at the 2011 Census for confidentiality reasons of the latter)
  - Density: 24/km^{2} (62/sq mi)
- OS grid reference: SP6033
- Civil parish: Mixbury
- District: Cherwell
- Shire county: Oxfordshire
- Region: South East
- Country: England
- Sovereign state: United Kingdom
- Post town: Brackley
- Postcode district: NN13
- Dialling code: 01280
- Police: Thames Valley
- Fire: Oxfordshire
- Ambulance: South Central
- UK Parliament: Bicester and Woodstock

Mixbury is a village and civil parish in Oxfordshire, about 2.5 miles (4 km) southeast of Brackley in Northamptonshire.

== Manor ==
The toponym is derived from the Old English mixen-burgh, meaning "fortification near dung-heap". "Burgh" refers to Beaumont Castle, which was built about 1100. It no longer stands, but its earthworks remain at the north end of the village.

The Domesday Book records that in 1086 Roger d'Ivry held a manor of 17 hides at Missberie. The manor was part of the Honour of St. Valery by 1213, when Robert de St. Valery gave Mixbury's mesne lordship to the Augustinian Osney Abbey. The abbey retained Mixbury until it was suppressed in the Dissolution of the monasteries in 1539.

== Parish church ==
The Church of England parish church of All Saints dates from the 12th century. The south doorway is Norman, dating from about 1170. Early in the 14th century all the windows were replaced with Decorated Gothic ones. A south aisle of three bays and a west tower were added at the same time. The Perpendicular Gothic clerestory was added later. The chancel was restored in 1843 and the remainder of the church was restored after 1848. All Saints' is a Grade II* listed building.

The west tower has three bells. The treble bell was cast in 1577 by John Appowell of Buckingham, the tenor in 1609 by Robert Atton of Buckingham and the second in 1627 by Bartholomew Atton of Buckingham. Ringing now is very restricted for safety reasons. The church clock is of unknown date, but appears to be late 17th century.

The ecclesiastical parish is now a member of the Shelswell Benefice.

== Economic and social history ==
Mixbury Inclosure Act 1729
- Act of Parliament
- Parliament of Great Britain
- Long title: An Act to confirm an Agreement for enclosing the Common Fields, Downs, Waste, and Unenclosed Lands, Part of the Manor of Mixbury, in the County of Oxon; and for other Purposes therein mentioned.
- Citation: 3 Geo. 2. c. 5 Pr.
- Territorial extent: Great Britain

Dates
- Royal assent: 24 March 1730
- Commencement: 13 January 1730 (Note: Start of session.)

Status: Current legislation

An open field system of farming prevailed in the parish until 1730. Evidence suggests that it may have begun with two fields, but by the latter part of the 17th century it had been reorganised as a more efficient three-field system. The fields were Middle Field, Sandfield and West Field. The Mixbury Inclosure Act 1729 (3 Geo. 2. c. 5 Pr.) resulting in an inclosure award being made the next year. This is by far the earliest inclosure act for an Oxfordshire parish: the next was not passed until 1758. The area enclosed under the act was about 2,000 acres (810 ha); land enclosed before 1729 by agreement without the need for an act had been about 445 acres (180 ha).

The main road between Buckingham and Banbury passes through the parish south of the village. It was made into a turnpike by an Act of Parliament in 1744.

The rector had the village school built in 1838. In 1928 it was reorganised as a junior school and older pupils were transferred to the school at Fringford. It was reorganised as an infants' school in 1948 and closed in 1955.

The original village consisted of thatch-roofed rubblestone cottages clustered between All Saints and the stream. In 1874 they were demolished under an order of the Court of Chancery and replaced with two rows of brick-faced semi-detached estate cottages laid out as a model village along the road leading south from the church.

=== Railways ===
In 1847–50 the Buckinghamshire Railway built its branch line to Banbury Merton Street through the northern part of the parish along the Great Ouse Valley. Fulwell & Westbury station was built on the line about 1 mile (1.6 km) northeast of the village.

The Great Central Main Line from Nottingham Victoria to London Marylebone was built through the eastern part of the parish in the 1890s and opened in 1899. The nearest station was Finmere for Buckingham, about 2 miles (3 km) southeast of Mixbury. Buckingham already had a railway station on the Buckinghamshire Railway, and was almost 5 miles (8 km) from the Great Central station, so the name was later shortened to the more appropriate "Finmere".

In 1961 British Railways closed Fulwell and Westbury station to passenger traffic. In 1963 The Reshaping of British Railways report recommended that BR close both the branch line to Banbury and the Great Central Main Line. It closed Finmere station and the Banbury branch line immediately, and the Great Central Main Line in 1966.

== Sources ==
- Beeson, C.F.C.; Simcock, A.V. (1989) [1962]. Clockmaking in Oxfordshire 1400–1850 (3rd ed.). Oxford: Museum of the History of Science. p. 47. ISBN 0-903364-06-9.
- Blomfield, James Charles (c. 1890). Part V: History of Fringford, Hethe, Mixbury, Newton Purcell, and Shelswell. Deanery of Bicester. Elliot Stock & Co: London.
- Gray, Howard L (1959) [1915]. The English Field Systems. Cambridge, MA; London: Harvard University Press; Merlin Press. pp. 113, 538.
- Lobel, Mary D, ed. (1959). A History of the County of Oxford. Victoria County History. Vol. 6. pp. 251–262.
- Rowley, Trevor (1978). Villages in the Landscape. Archaeology in the Field Series. London: J.M. Dent & Sons Ltd. pp. 138–139. ISBN 0-460-04166-5.
- Sherwood, Jennifer; Pevsner, Nikolaus (1974). The Buildings of England: Oxfordshire. Harmondsworth: Penguin Books. p. 710. ISBN 0-14-071045-0.
