= Godington =

Village in Oxfordshire, England

Coordinates: 51.945°N 01.066°W

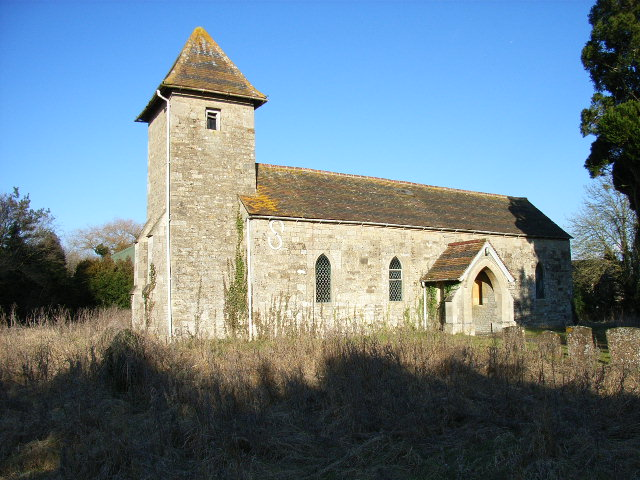
- Holy Trinity parish church

- Location within Oxfordshire
- Population: 40 (2001 census)
- OS grid reference: SP6427
- Civil parish: Godington
- District: Cherwell
- Shire county: Oxfordshire
- Region: South East
- Country: England
- Sovereign state: United Kingdom
- Post town: Bicester
- Postcode district: OX27
- Dialling code: 01869
- Police: Thames Valley
- Fire: Oxfordshire
- Ambulance: South Central
- UK Parliament: Bicester and Woodstock

Godington is a village and civil parish about 5 miles (8 km) northeast of Bicester in Oxfordshire. The parish is bounded on all but the west side by a brook called the Birne, which at this point forms also the county boundary with Buckinghamshire. The parish was included in the figures of Stratton Audley for the purposes of the 2011 United Kingdom census.

== Manor ==
The village was first settled by the Saxons. Its toponym is derived from Old English: either Gōdan dūn (the hill of Goda) or Gōdinga dūn (Goda's people).

Before the Norman Conquest of England two Saxons, Siward and Siwate, held the Manor of Godington, but the Domesday Book records that by 1086 a Norman called Richard Puingiant held it. He also held the manor of Middleton Stoney, and Godington was held as part of the latter manor for some centuries thereafter.

By the middle of the 12th century, the manor of Godington was held by Richard de Camville, who gave Poodle Farm in the parish to the Augustinian Missenden Abbey in Buckinghamshire. The Abbey retained Poodle Farm until the dissolution of the monasteries in the 16th century. By 1541 William Fermor of Somerton had bought the farm. By the time of his death in 1552 Fermor also held Godington Manor, thus reuniting Poodle with the other former de Camville lands. Godington remained with the Fermors until the last direct heir, another William Fermor, died without a direct successor in 1828.

There is a rectangular mediaeval moat next to the parish church. The present Moat Farm house inside the moated area is dated 1672.

By 1535 Magdalen College, Oxford held three hay meadows in the parish. It still held them in 1817, when the duty to pay tithes was commuted. Most of the parish was farmed under the open field system until 1603, when it was enclosed by agreement between Sir Richard Fermor, the Rector and one of the local farmers.

== Church and chapel ==
The earliest written record of the parish church is from 1221, when the Abbess of the Benedictine Elstow Abbey in Bedfordshire disputed with a later Richard de Camville which one of them held the advowson of the parish. The Abbey won, and retained the right until its dissolution in 1539. After this the Crown held the advowson until 1608, when it was sold to Sir Henry Fowkes who immediately sold it on to Corpus Christi College, Oxford.

The Fermors were recusants and with their support the majority of Godington parishioners remained Roman Catholic. In 1739 Roman Catholics still outnumbered Anglicans in the parish, and a Roman Catholic priest lived in the parish to serve them. Early in the 19th century it was recorded that the farming families were Catholic but their labourers were Protestant. Until 1900 in the roof of the farmhouse at Moat Farm there was a Roman Catholic chapel that was served by a priest from Hethe. In 1759 it was also recorded that recusants from Godington worshipped at the Fermor family chapel at Tusmore Park.

By 1790 the mediaeval Church of England parish church of the Holy Trinity was in disrepair and in danger of collapse, and in 1792 William Fermor employed a fellow-Roman Catholic to rebuild it. In 1852 the church was restored and rectangular Georgian windows were converted to lancets, and in 1905 the building was restored again. The mediaeval font survives and some mediaeval masonry remains in the bell tower. The tower used to have three bells, but in 1792 two of them were sold to pay for rebuilding the church. The surviving bell was cast in 1717, and there is also a Sanctus bell cast in 1793.

By 1665 the Rectory was a large house, assessed at six hearths for hearth tax. By 1787 it was "ruinous and decayed" and Corpus Christi College loaned £200 to rebuild it. In 1867 it was replaced with a new parsonage on a different site, designed by the architect William Wilkinson. In 1928 the ecclesiastical parish of Godington was combined with that of Stratton Audley, and in the 1930s the "new" parsonage was sold as a private house, now called The Old Rectory. The parish of Stratton Audley with Godington is now part of the benefice of Stratton Audley with Godington, Fringford with Hethe and Stoke Lyne. The benefice is part of the Shelswell group of parishes.

== Railways ==
Between 1895 and 1899 the Great Central Main Line extended its main line from the Midlands to London. It passes through the east of Godington parish on an embankment, crossing in and out of the parish (and county) on bridges over the Birne. Godington was too small to have its own railway station, and the nearest Great Central ones were Finmere and Calvert, about 3.5 miles (5.6 km) from the village in either direction. British Railways closed Finmere in 1963, Calvert in 1964 and the main line between Calvert and Rugby in 1966.

Godington was nearer to Marsh Gibbon and Poundon station, about 2 miles (3 km) to the south on the Varsity Line. The London and North Western Railway opened this station in 1880 and BR closed it in 1968.

== Modern economy ==
The parish has been associated with equestrianism. In the 1950s its coverts were favoured by the Bicester Hunt. Since the 1980s Godington Stud has bred Trakehner warmblood horses for sports.

== Sources ==
- Lobel, Mary D., ed. (1959). A History of the County of Oxford: Volume 6. Victoria County History. pp. 146–152.
- Sherwood, Jennifer; Pevsner, Nikolaus (1974). Oxfordshire. The Buildings of England. Harmondsworth: Penguin Books. p. 613. ISBN 0-14-071045-0.
