= Thomas Vaughan (philosopher) =

Welsh philosopher (1621–1666)

Thomas Vaughan (1621 − 27 February 1666) was a Welsh clergyman, philosopher, and alchemist, who wrote in English. He is now remembered for his work in the field of natural magic. He also published under the pseudonym Eugenius Philalethes.

His influences included Johannes Trithemius (1462–1516), Heinrich Cornelius Agrippa (1486–1535), Michael Sendivogius (1566–1636), and Rosicrucianism (early 17th century).

== Life ==
A Royalist clergyman from Brecon, Wales, Thomas was the twin brother of the poet Henry Vaughan, both being born at Newton, in the parish of St. Bridget's, in early 1621 (or possibly 1622). He entered Jesus College, Oxford, in 1638, and remained there for a decade during the English Civil War.

Vaughan took part in the Battle of Rowton Heath in 1645. Although still based in Oxford, he became Rector of Llansantffraed (St Bridget), Wales, in 1640 and took up medical studies, motivated by the lack of doctors there. In 1650, however, Vaughan was evicted from the parish for his Royalist sympathies and alleged drunkenness.

Vaughan later became involved in a plan with Thomas Henshaw and Robert Child to form a chemical club, with a laboratory and library, the main aim being to translate and collect chemical works. He married a woman named Rebecca in 1651 and spent the next period of his life in London. After her death in 1658, he re-dedicated their research notebook, now in the British Library (MS, Sloane 1741).

In 1661, Vaughan fell out with an alchemical collaborator, Edward Bolnest, over money matters and alleged broken promises, and the matter came to litigation after Bolnest had threatened violence. Vaughan was accused as part of this affair of spending "most of his time in the study of Naturall Philosophy and Chimicall Phisick". He is reported as having confessed that he had "long sought and long missed... the philosopher's stone."

After the Restoration, he found a patron in Sir Robert Moray, with whom he fled from London to Oxford during the plague of 1665.

Vaughan died at the house of Samuel Kem, at Albury, Oxfordshire.

== Works ==
Although he did not practice medicine, Vaughan sought to apply his chemical skills to preparing medicines in the manner recommended by Paracelsus. He corresponded with Samuel Hartlib, who by 1650 was paying attention to Vaughan as author, and established a reputation with his book Anthroposophia Theomagica, a magico-mystical work. Vaughan was the author of tracts published under the pseudonym Eugenius Philalethes, as is now generally agreed.

Vaughan was unusual amongst alchemists of the time in that he worked closely with his wife Rebecca Vaughan. He was a self-described member of the "Society of Unknown Philosophers", and was responsible for translating into English in 1652 the Fama Fraternitatis Rosae Crucis, an anonymous Rosicrucian manifesto first published in 1614 in Kassel, Germany.

Vaughan quarrelled in print with Henry More. Their pamphlet war petered out, but More returned to the subject of alchemists in Enthusiasmus Triumphatus (1656). Another critic of Vaughan was John Gaule.

Allen G. Debus has written that a simple explanation of Vaughan's natural philosophy, in its mature form, is as the De occulta of Cornelius Agrippa, in an exposition coming via the views of Michael Sendivogius. As a writer in the school of Sendivogius, Vaughan follows Jacques de Nuisement and Andreas Orthelius. He placed himself in the tradition of the Rosicrucian reformers of education, and of Johannes Trithemius, his teacher Libanius Gallus, and Pelagius of Majorca, teacher of Libanius (of whom the last two are not known to have been real people apart from what Trithemius relates of them).

According to some writers of catalogues of hermetic and alchemical treatises (such as John Ferguson, Denis Ian Duveen, Vinci Verginelli et al.), Thomas Vaughan could be the anonymous author of the treatise Reconditorium ac Reclusorium Opulentiae Sapientiaeque Numinis Mundi Magni, cui deditur in titulum CHYMICA VANNUS... Amstelodami... Anno 1666, i. e. a mysterious masterpiece of the hermetic tradition.

== Posthumous attack ==
In 1896 Vaughan was the subject of a hoax making alleged revelations as to the practice of devil-worship by the initiates of freemasonry, and that Thomas had helped to found freemasonry as a Satanic society. Leo Taxil, a Parisian journalist, was eventually revealed as the perpetrator of what is now called the Taxil hoax.
