= Hethe =

Village in Oxfordshire, England

Coordinates: 51.960°N 1.137°W

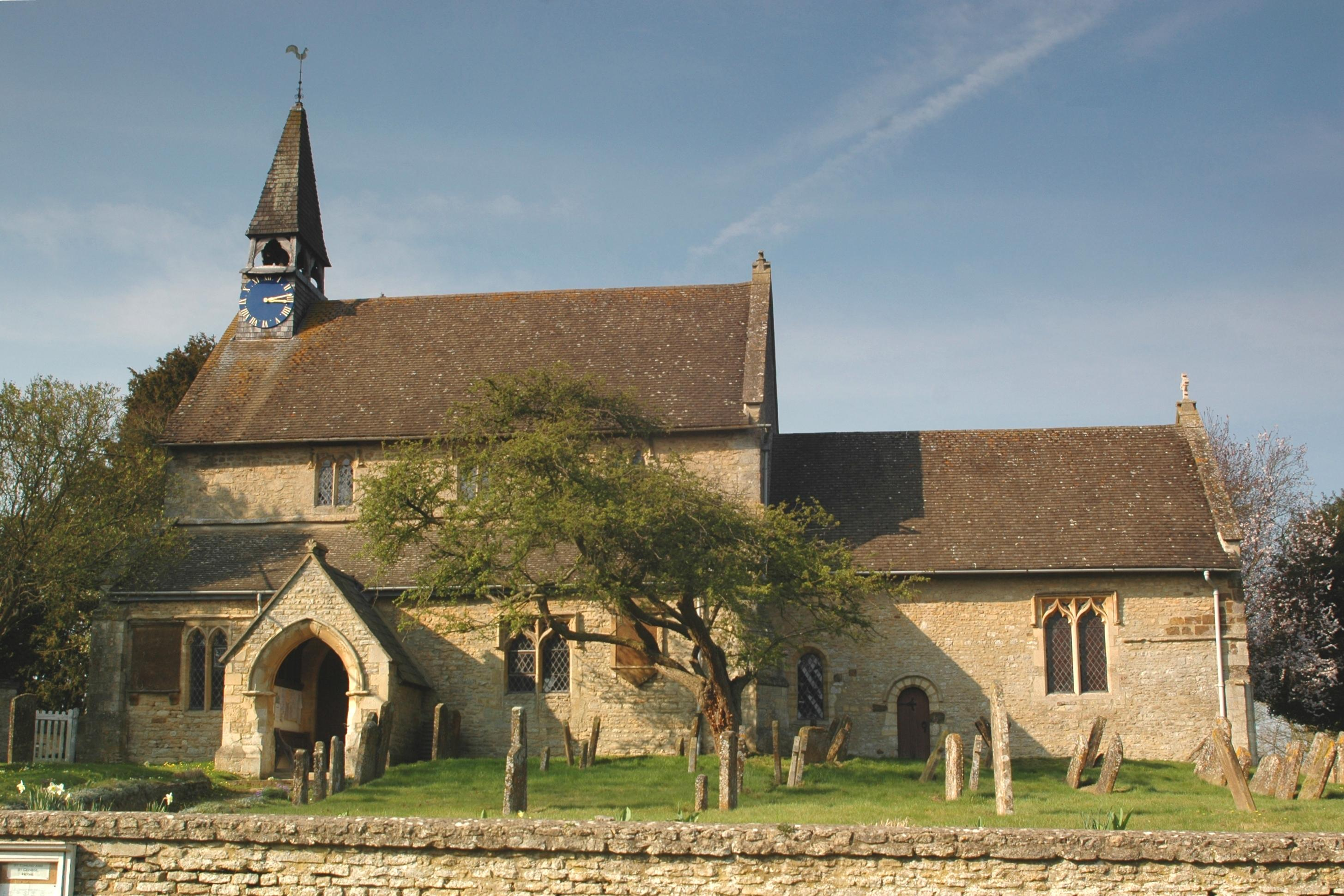
- St Edmund & St George parish church

- Location within Oxfordshire
- Area: 5.75 km^{2} (2.22 sq mi)
- Population: 279 (2001 census)
  - Density: 49/km^{2} (130/sq mi)
- OS grid reference: SP5929
- Civil parish: Hethe
- District: Cherwell
- Shire county: Oxfordshire
- Region: South East
- Country: England
- Sovereign state: United Kingdom
- Post town: Bicester
- Postcode district: OX27
- Dialling code: 01869
- Police: Thames Valley
- Fire: Oxfordshire
- Ambulance: South Central
- UK Parliament: Bicester and Woodstock

Hethe is a village and civil parish about 4.5 miles (7.2 km) north of Bicester in Oxfordshire, England.

== Manor ==
The village's toponym comes from the Old English hæð meaning "heath, uncultivated ground".

Before and after the Norman Conquest of England Wulfward the White, a thegn of King Edward the Confessor's Queen Edith, owned the manor of Hethe. However, by 1086 William the Conqueror had granted the manor to Geoffrey de Montbray, who was both Bishop of Coutances and also one of William's senior military commanders. By the 12th century the manor belonged to the Earls of Gloucester, with whom it stayed until the 4th Earl of Gloucester died without a successor in 1314. In 1347 the manor passed to the 1st Earl of Stafford. It remained with the Staffords (who from 1402 were also Dukes of Buckingham) until 1521, when Edward Stafford, 3rd Duke of Buckingham was executed for treason and his properties were attainted to the Crown.

Somewhen after 1167 St Bartholomew's Hospital in London was given a hide of land at Hethe. In 1537 the hospital was dissolved under the dissolution of the monasteries and the Crown seized all its lands, but in 1547 the hospital was refounded. The hospital retained its holding at Hethe at least as late as 1682.

Hethe House was built in the 18th century. It used to be a dower house for Shelswell.

The parish was farmed under an open field system until 1772, when an Act of Parliament enabled its enclosure.

== Churches ==
=== Church of England ===
The Church of England parish church of Saint Edmund and Saint George is known to have existed by 1154, when it was given to the Augustinian Priory at Kenilworth, later Kenilworth Abbey. Both the west wall of the nave and the south wall of the chancel survive from this time, each retaining a Norman lancet window and the latter a priest's doorway from the same period. The east end of the chancel was rebuilt early in the 13th century when a Decorated Gothic east window was inserted. In the 15th century a Perpendicular Gothic clerestory was added to the nave. When the Abbey was dissolved in 1538 the advowson of Hethe passed to the Crown, which has retained it ever since.

In 1854 Samuel Wilberforce, Bishop of Oxford complained that the St. Edmund and St. George was "in most miserable order" and "utterly too small for the population". In 1859 the Gothic Revival architect G.E. Street restored the building, widened the chancel arch, and added the bell-turret and the north aisle. Street moved the Decorated Style east window from the chancel to the north aisle, and inserted a new east window in the chancel in its place. In 1924 the living was combined with that of Fringford. The parish is now part of the benefice of Stratton Audley with Godington, Fringford with Hethe and Stoke Lyne. The benefice is part of the Shelswell group of parishes.

The Old Rectory was in existence by 1679. In 1928 it was refitted after being burnt out.

=== Roman Catholic ===
No Roman Catholics were reported in Hethe from the English Reformation in the 1540s until after the English Civil War. However, in the first half of the 16th century William Fermor of Somerton bought the manor of Hardwick 1 mile (1.6 km) west of Hethe, in 1606 Sir Richard Fermor bought the manor of Tusmore, 2 miles (3.2 km) west of Hethe and in 1625 the Fermor family moved to Tusmore from Somerton. The Fermors were a recusant family who had their own Roman Catholic chapel, a family priest (usually a Jesuit), and employed Catholic staff whom they allowed to attend Mass at their family chapel. The Fermors supported Catholic communities who farmed their lands at Godington (3 miles (4.8 km) east of Hethe), Hardwick and Somerton.

At some time the Fermors acquired land at Hethe, and in 1676 ten Catholics working for the Fermors were living there. A Roman Catholic population numbering less than ten survived in Hethe survived throughout the 18th and early part of the 19th centuries, some but not all of them working for the Fermors. They attended Mass at the chapel in Tusmore until the Fermors closed it for refurbishment in 1768. Thereafter they attended Mass at a chapel in Hardwick created in the attic of the manor house, but the Fermors sold the manor in 1828 and the new owner closed the chapel in 1830.

In 1832 the priest from Hardwick had Holy Trinity church built at Hethe to serve the Roman Catholic population there and in surrounding villages. It is a Gothic Revival building but the name of its architect is not recorded.

=== Methodist ===
By 1794 Hethe had a small Methodist congregation. It built its first chapel in 1854 and replaced this with a second chapel in 1876. The latter was still being used as a chapel in 1955 but is now a private house.

== Social and economic history ==
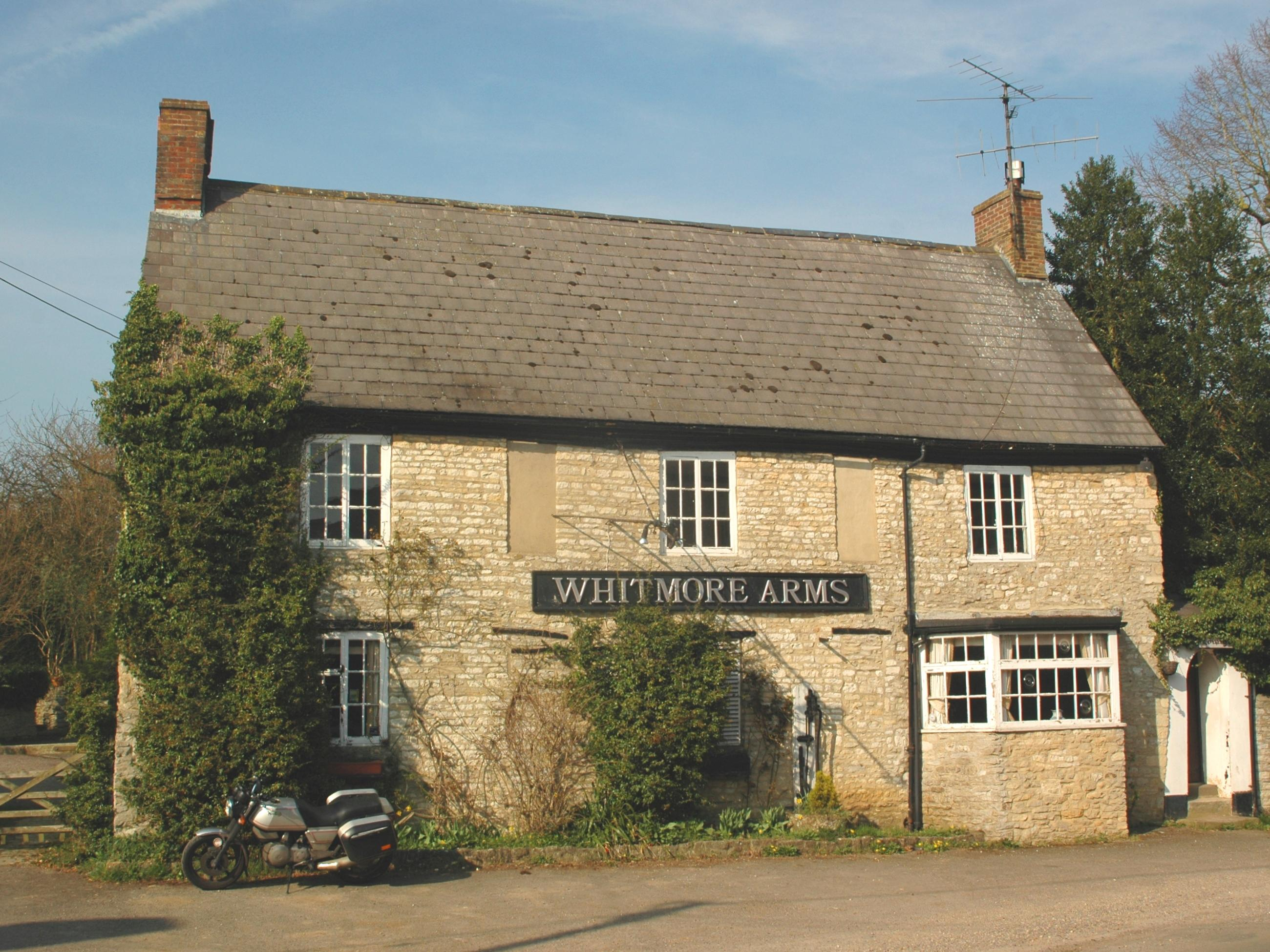
The Whitmore Arms

Hethe has a public house, which until the early part of the 19th century was called the Maltster's Arms. It was then renamed the Whitmore Arms, after Thomas Whitmore who lived at Hethe House 1808–11. It has been a Grade II listed building since 1988. Since 2012 it has been called The Muddy Duck.

A National School was built in 1852 and enlarged in 1874. In 1924 it was reorganised as a junior school and in 1948 it was reorganised again as an infants' school. In 1954 it was still open as a Church of England school, but it is now closed. In 1831 land was bought to build a Roman Catholic school. Building was begun then, but not completed until 1870 when it opened as St. Philip's School. By 1920 it was an infants' school and in 1924 it was closed.

In 2020 the village football pitch next to the village hall started hosting the home matches of Oxfordshire Senior League team Ashton Folly.

== Sources and further reading ==
- Blomfield, James Charles (c. 1890). Part V: History of Fringford, Hethe, Mixbury, Newton Purcell, and Shelswell. Deanery of Bicester. Elliot Stock & Co: London.
- Lobel, Mary D, ed. (1959). A History of the County of Oxford: Volume 6. Victoria County History. pp. 174–181.
- Sherwood, Jennifer; Pevsner, Nikolaus (1974). Oxfordshire. The Buildings of England. Harmondsworth: Penguin Books. pp. 645–646. ISBN 0-14-071045-0.
