= Beaumont Castle =

- Mixbury, Oxfordshire, England

Site information
- Type: Possible Motte and bailey or ringwork
- Condition: Limited earthworks remain

Location
- Shown within Oxfordshire
- Coordinates: 52.002°N 1.113°W

Beaumont Castle was a medieval castle in Mixbury, Oxfordshire, England, located at grid reference SP610140.

== History ==
Beaumont Castle was a possible motte and bailey or ringwork castle built in the village of Mixbury, Oxfordshire, England. The castle was probably built by Roger d'Ivry following the Norman invasion of England. The castle was probably called Beaumont because it occupied a natural promontory overlooking a local stream. The castle was abandoned before 1216. Private excavations by two brothers from London in 1954–5 allegedly revealed a dungeon and an underground passage, although this discovery is disputed by scholars. The site is registered as a scheduled monument.

== See also ==
- Castles in Great Britain and Ireland
- List of castles in England
