= Stratton Audley =

Village in Oxfordshire, England

Coordinates: 51.930°N 01.117°W

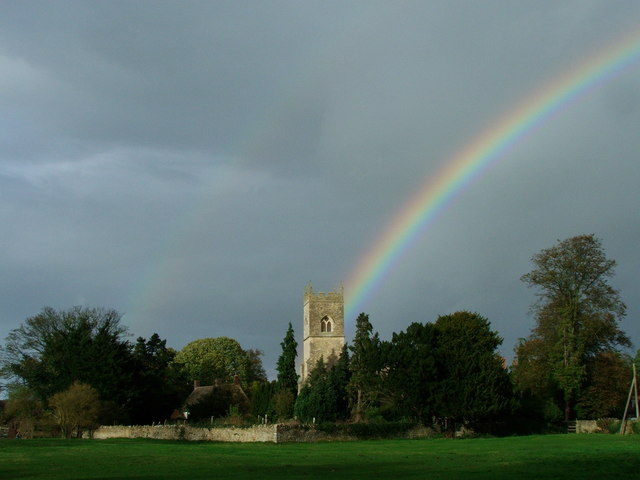
- The Tower of St Mary and St Edburga's

- Location within Oxfordshire
- Area: 13.36 km^{2} (5.16 sq mi)
- Population: 434 (including Godington, the population is less and likely to be similar to as in the 2001 census when the figures were not confidential and the population was 393 people)
  - Density: 32/km^{2} (83/sq mi)
- OS grid reference: SP6026
- Civil parish: Stratton Audley
- District: Cherwell
- Shire county: Oxfordshire
- Region: South East
- Country: England
- Sovereign state: United Kingdom
- Post town: Bicester
- Postcode district: OX27
- Dialling code: 01869
- Police: Thames Valley
- Fire: Oxfordshire
- Ambulance: South Central
- UK Parliament: Bicester and Woodstock

Stratton Audley is a village and civil parish about 2.5 miles (4 km) northeast of Bicester in Oxfordshire, England.

== Manor ==
The Domesday Book of 1086 records that Robert D'Oyly held five hides of land at Stratton. Like many D'Oyly manors, Stratton later became part of the Honour of Wallingford. The Honour of Wallingford became part of the Earldom of Cornwall and thence in the 15th century a number of former Wallingford manors became part of the Duke of Suffolk's Honour of Ewelme.

The Audley family became tenants of the manor by marriage in 1244 and built a moated castle there by 1263. Stratton remained in the Audley family until Hugh Audley, Earl of Gloucester died in 1347 leaving the manor to his daughter Margaret, wife of Ralph de Stafford, 1st Earl of Stafford. The castle does not survive, but its remains were excavated in 1870.

The present manor house was originally 16th century. It was altered in the latter half of the 17th century and partly rebuilt in the 19th and 20th centuries.

== Parish church ==
The Church of England parish church of Saint Mary and Saint Edburga dates from the 12th century but was largely rebuilt in the 13th and 14th centuries. The Decorated Gothic bell tower was added late in the 14th century. The church has a Jacobean pulpit and elm table, the latter dated 1636. There is also an oak tower screen, which was made in the 20th century by the Oxford Diocesan Surveyor T. Lawrence Dale. The church is a Grade I listed building.

In 1552 the church had three bells plus a Sanctus bell. The bells were re-hung in 1636. Richard Keene of Woodstock cast the present third, fourth and fifth bells in 1693 and re-cast the Sanctus bell in about 1699. Henry III Bagley of Chacombe cast the tenor bell in 1721. Pack and Chapman of the Whitechapel Bell Foundry cast the treble bell in 1779, completing the present ring of five bells. The ring was re-hung in 1902 but part of the disused 1636 frame is preserved in the church.

St Mary & St Edburga's is now part of the benefice of Stratton Audley with Godington, Fringford with Hethe and Stoke Lyne. The benefice is part of the Shelswell group of parishes.

== Economic and social history ==
There was some enclosure of land in the parish in the 16th century, and by 1779 the enclosed land totalled 300 acres (120 ha). Arable farming continued on an open field system until Parliament passed an inclosure act, the Stratton Audley and Caversfield Inclosure Act 1780 (20 Geo. 3. c. 50 Pr.), to enable all Stratton Audley's open fields and common lands to be enclosed.

A school was opened in 1808 supported by Sir John Borlase Warren, 1st Baronet, who provided a house and salary for the schoolmaster. New premises for the school were completed and opened in 1837. It was affiliated to the National Society for Promoting Religious Education. In 1929 it was reorganised as a junior school and senior pupils were transferred to the school at Fringford. It became a voluntary controlled school in 1951 and was still open in 1954.

== Amenities ==
Stratton Audley has one public house, the Red Lion,

== Sources ==
- Lobel, Mary D, ed. (1959). A History of the County of Oxford: Volume 6. Victoria County History. pp. 324–333.
- Sherwood, Jennifer; Pevsner, Nikolaus (1974). Oxfordshire. The Buildings of England. Harmondsworth: Penguin Books. pp. 794–795. ISBN 0-14-071045-0.
