= Stoke Lyne =

Village in Oxfordshire, England

Coordinates: 51.950°N 1.176°W

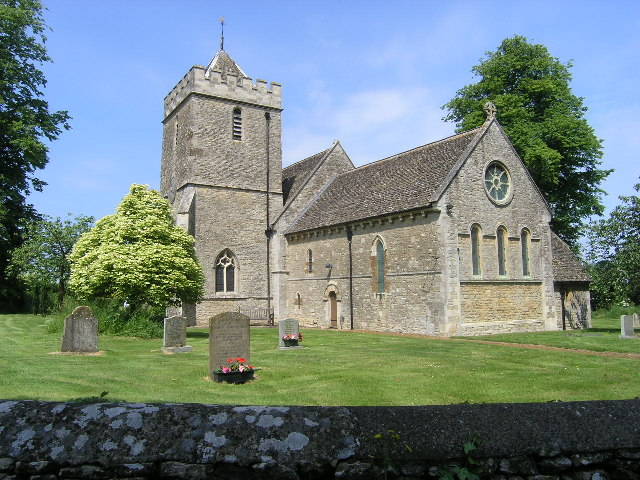
- St. Peter's parish church

- Location within Oxfordshire
- Area: 13.02 km^{2} (5.03 sq mi)
- Population: 418 (2011 census)
  - Density: 32/km^{2} (83/sq mi)
- OS grid reference: SP5628
- Civil parish: Stoke Lyne
- District: Cherwell
- Shire county: Oxfordshire
- Region: South East
- Country: England
- Sovereign state: United Kingdom
- Post town: Bicester
- Postcode district: OX27
- Dialling code: 01869
- Police: Thames Valley
- Fire: Oxfordshire
- Ambulance: South Central
- UK Parliament: Bicester and Woodstock

Stoke Lyne is a village and civil parish about 4 miles (6.4 km) north of Bicester, Oxfordshire in southern England.

== Etymology ==
The name Stoke Lyne is first attested, simply as Stoches, in the Domesday Book of 1086. This name comes from the Old English word stoc ('secondary settlement, outlying farmstead, dairy farm'). As Stoke is a very common name in England, this was later disambiguated: the form Stoke del Isle ('Stoke of the Del Isle family') is attested in 1328, and in the Latinised form Stoke Insula already in 1316. In the early fifteenth century, the estate was bought by William Lynde, and the name came to be disambiguated through the addition of his family's name. This is first attested in 1526 in the form Stokelynde; the present-day form is first attested as Stoke-lyne in 1658.

== Battle of Fethan leag ==
According to the Anglo-Saxon Chronicle, in 584 CE a Saxon army led by King Ceawlin of Wessex and his son Cutha fought an army of Britons "at the place which is named Fethan leag". Cutha was killed but his father Ceawlin won "many towns and countless war-loot". A 12th-century document records a wood called "Fethelée" in a reference to Stoke Lyne, so it is now thought the Chronicle is depicting a battle near Stoke Lyne.

Modern historians doubt, however, that such a battle took place. In the assessment of Patrick Sims-Williams, "the name means 'wood (or clearing) of the soldier or band of soldiers (or of the battle)'. That could be a coincidence, or the site could be named after the 584 battle; but in view of the earlier folk-etymologies [in the Chronicle] one is bound to suspect that the annal really reflects a legend explaining the place-name".

== Manor ==
Tostig Godwinson, Earl of Northumbria held the manor of Stoke Lyne before the Norman Conquest of England in 1066. When Tostig's elder brother Harold Godwinson was crowned King Harold II in January 1066, Earl Tostig encouraged Harald III of Norway to invade England, but in September Harold II defeated the Norwegian army at the Battle of Stamford Bridge and both Harald and Tostig were killed in the fighting.

The Domesday Book records that in 1086 Stoke Lyne's feudal overlord was Walter Giffard, who William II made 1st Earl of Buckingham in 1097. The manor remained part of the honour of Giffard until Walter Giffard, 2nd Earl of Buckingham died without an heir in 1164. It then passed to Richard de Clare, 2nd Earl of Pembroke, who was descended from a sister of the first Walter Giffard. It remained with his heirs until Anselm Marshal, 6th Earl of Pembroke died without a male heir in 1245. Anselm's estates were divided between five co-heiresses and Stoke Lyne passed to Richard de Clare, 5th Earl of Hertford and 2nd Earl of Gloucester, whose mother Isabel Marshal was a daughter of William Marshal, 1st Earl of Pembroke. Richard de Clare's grandson Gilbert de Clare, 7th Earl of Hertford was killed at the Battle of Bannockburn in 1314 leaving no male heir. His estates were divided between his three sisters but there is no mention of Stoke Lyne being among them.

Thereafter the Earls of Oxford held Stoke Lyne as part of their honour of Whitchurch until at least the 16th century.

== Parish church ==
The Church of England parish church of Saint Peter has a late Norman nave and chancel. A north aisle was added in the 13th century and a south tower was added early in the 14th century. Most of the north aisle was demolished, leaving just the easternmost bay as a north transept. St. Peter's is a Grade II* listed building.

The tower has three bells, all cast by the Whitechapel Bell Foundry. Thomas II Mears cast the second bell in 1812, while Mears and Stainbank cast the treble in 1869 and the tenor in 1925.

The parish is now part of the benefice of Stratton Audley with Godington, Fringford with Hethe and Stoke Lyne. The benefice is part of the Shelswell group of parishes.

A Church of England school for the village was built in 1864 and reorganised as a junior school in 1930. It was still open in 1954 but has since closed.

== Amenities ==
Stoke Lyne has a public house, the Peyton Arms, controlled by the Hook Norton Brewery. Stoke Lyne has a Women's Institute.

== Sources ==
- Ellis, Peter Berresford (1994) [1993]. Celt and Saxon The Struggle for Britain AD 410–937. London: Constable & Co. p. 84. ISBN 0-09-473260-4.
- Lobel, Mary D, ed. (1959). A History of the County of Oxford, Volume 6. Victoria County History. pp. 312–323.
- Sherwood, Jennifer; Pevsner, Nikolaus (1974). Oxfordshire. The Buildings of England. Harmondsworth: Penguin Books. p. 789. ISBN 0-14-071045-0.
- Stenton, Frank M (1971). Anglo-Saxon England. Oxford: Clarendon Press. p. 29. ISBN 0-19-821716-1.
- Swanton, Michael, ed. (1996). The Anglo-Saxon Chronicle. New York: Routledge. pp. 14–21. ISBN 0-415-92129-5.
