= Henry Vaughan =

Welsh metaphysical poet (1621–1695)

- Born: 1621; Newton St Bridget, Brecknockshire, Wales
- Died: 23 April 1695 (aged 73–74); Scethrog House, Llansantffraed, Brecknockshire, Wales
- Occupation: Poet
- Spouse(s): Catherine Vaughan, Elizabeth Vaughan
- Relatives: Thomas Vaughan
- Writing career
- Period: 17th century
- Genre: Poetry
- Notable work: Silex Scintillans

Henry Vaughan (1621 – 23 April 1695) was a Welsh metaphysical poet, author and translator writing in English, and a medical physician. His religious poetry appeared in Silex Scintillans in 1650, with a second part in 1655. In 1646 his Poems, with the Tenth Satire of Juvenal Englished was published. Meanwhile he had been persuaded by reading the religious poet George Herbert to renounce "idle verse". The prose Mount of Olives and Solitary Devotions (1652) show his authenticity and depth of convictions. Two more volumes of secular verse followed, ostensibly without his sanction, but it is his religious verse that has been acclaimed. He also translated short moral and religious works and two medical works in prose. In the 1650s he began a lifelong medical practice.

== Early life ==
Henry Vaughan was born at Newton by Usk in the Llansantffraed (St. Bridget's) parish of Brecknockshire, the eldest known child of Thomas Vaughan (c. 1586–1658) of Tretower and Denise Jenkin (born c. 1593), the only daughter and heir of David and Gwenllian Morgan of Llansantffraed. Vaughan had a twin brother, Thomas Vaughan, who became a philosopher and alchemist.

Vaughan was kin to two powerful Welsh families, one Catholic, one Protestant. His paternal grandfather, William, owned Tretower Court. His paternal grandmother, Frances, was the natural daughter of Thomas Somerset, who spent some 24 years in the Tower of London for adhering to Catholicism. As she survived into Vaughan's boyhood, there may have been some direct Catholic influence on his early nurturing. Vaughan shared ancestry with the Herbert family through the daughter of a famous Welsh knight, Dafydd Gam, slain at Agincourt, the "Davy Gam, esquire" of William Shakespeare's Henry V. He is not known to have claimed kinship with George Herbert, but may have been aware of the tie.

== Education ==
Thomas Vaughan later remarked that "English is a Language the Author was not born to." Both boys were sent to school under Matthew Herbert, Rector of Llangattock, to whom both wrote tributes. Matthew Herbert may have reinforced a devotion to church and monarchy the boys had learnt at home. Like several of Vaughan's clerical acquaintances, he later proved uncompromising during the interregnum. He was imprisoned, his property was seized, and he narrowly avoided banishment.

The buttery books of Jesus College, Oxford show Thomas Vaughan being admitted in May 1638. It is thought that Henry went up at the same time; Anthony Wood states, "He made his first entry into Jesus College in Michaelmas term 1638, aged 17 years. There is no clear record to establish Henry's residence or matriculation, but the assumption of his association with Oxford, supported by his inclusion in Athenae Oxoniensis, is reasonable enough."

Recent research in the Jesus College archives, however, suggests that Henry did not enter Jesus College before 1641, unless he did so in 1639 without matriculating or paying an admission fee, and left before the record in the surviving buttery books resumes in December of that year. It has been suggested that Henry went to Oxford later, after Thomas, based on poems each wrote for a 1651 edition of the Comedies, Tragi-Comedies, with Other Poems of William Cartwright, who had died in 1643. Thomas had clearly attended Cartwright's lectures, which were a draw at the time: "When He did read, how did we flock to hear!" Henry apparently had not, as his poem "Upon the poems and plays of the ever-memorable Mr William Cartwright" begins with the words, "I did but see thee." This and the 1647 poem "Upon Mr Fletcher's plays" are celebrations of Royalist volumes that implied "a reaffirmation of Cavalier ideals and a gesture of defiance against the society which had repudiated them."

As the Civil War developed, Vaughan was recalled home from London, initially to serve as a secretary to Sir Marmaduke Lloyd, a chief justice on the Brecknockshire circuit and staunch royalist. Vaughan is thought to have served briefly in the Royalist army. On his return, he began to practise medicine.

By 1646, Vaughan had married Catherine Wise, with whom he reared a son, Thomas, and three daughters, Lucy, Frances, and Catherine. His courtship with his first wife is reflected in "Upon the Priory Grove", in his first volume of poetry, Poems, with the Tenth Satire of Juvenal Englished (1646). After his first wife's death, he married her sister, Elizabeth, probably in 1655.

== Secular works ==
Vaughan took his literary inspiration from his native environment and chose the descriptive name "Silurist", derived from his homage to the Silures, a Celtic tribe of pre-Roman south Wales that strongly resisted the Romans. The name reflects the love Vaughan felt for the Welsh mountains of his home, in what is now part of the Brecon Beacons National Park and the River Usk valley, where he spent most of his early and professional life.

By 1647, Vaughan with his wife and children had chosen life in the countryside. This was the setting in which Vaughan wrote Olor Iscanus (The Swan of Usk). However, it was not published until 1651, over three years after it was written, which presumably reflects some crisis in Vaughan's life. During those years, his grandfather William Vaughan died and he was evicted from his living in Llansantffraed. Vaughan later decried the publication, having "long ago condemned these poems to obscurity."

Olor Iscanus is filled with odd words and similes that beg attention, despite its dark and morbid cognitive appeal. It is founded on crises felt in Vaughan's homeland, Brecknockshire. No major battle was fought there in the Civil War, but the effects of the war were deeply felt by him and his community. The Puritan Parliament visited misfortune, ejecting Anglicans and Royalists. Vaughan also lost his home at that time.

There is a marked difference in the atmosphere Vaughan attempts to convey in this work and in his most famous work, Silex Scintillans. Olor Iscanus represents a specific period in Vaughan's life, which emphasises other secular writers and provides allusions to debt and happy living. A fervent topic of Vaughan throughout the poems is the Civil War, and it reveals Vaughan's somewhat paradoxical thinking, which ultimately fails to show whether he took part or not. Vaughan states complete satisfaction at being clean of "innocent blood", but also provides seemingly eyewitness accounts of battles and his own "soldiery". Although Vaughan is thought to have been a Royalist, these poems express contempt for all current authority and show a lack of zeal for the Royalist cause. His poems generally reflect a sense of severe decline, which may mean he lamented the effects of the war on the monarchy and society. His short poem "The Timber", ostensibly about a dead tree, concludes: "thy strange resentment after death / Means only those who broke – in life – thy peace."

Olor Iscanus includes translations from the Latin of Ovid, Boethius, and the Polish poet Casimir Sarbiewski.

== Conversion and sacred poetry ==
It was not until the writing of Silex Scintillans that Vaughan received significant acclaim. The period shortly preceding the publication of the first volume of the work (1650) marked an important period of his life. Certain indications in the first volume and explicit statements in the preface to the second volume (1655) suggest that Vaughan suffered a prolonged sickness that inflicted much pain. Vaughan interprets this experience as an encounter with death that alerted him to a "misspent youth". Vaughan believed he had been spared to make amends and start a new course not only in his life but in the literature he would produce. He described his previous work as foul and a contribution to "corrupt literature". Perhaps the most notable mark of Vaughan's conversion is how much it is credited to George Herbert. Vaughan claims he is the least of Herbert's many "pious converts". The influence of Herbert's poetry has been widely noted, with many of Vaughan's works based on works by Herbert. It was during this period of Vaughan's life, around 1650, that he adopted the saying "Moriendo, revixi" – by dying, I gain new life.

The first volume of Silex Scintillans was followed by The Mount of Olives, or Solitary Devotions (1652), a prose book of devotions providing prayers for various stages in the day, for prayer in church and for other purposes. It appears as a "companion volume" to the Book of Common Prayer, to which it alludes frequently, although it had been outlawed under the Commonwealth. The work was also influenced by Lancelot Andrewes's Preces Privatae (1615) and John Cosin's Collection of Private Devotions (1627). Flores Solitudinis (1654) contains translations from the Latin of two works by the Spanish Jesuit Juan Eusebio Nieremberg, one by a 5th-century Bishop of Lyon, Eucherius, and by Paulinus of Nola, of whom Vaughan wrote a prose life.

Vaughan practised medicine, perhaps as early as the 1640s. He attached to the second volume of Silex Scintillans (1655) a translation of Henry Nollius's Hermetical Physick. He went on to produce a translation of Nollius's The Chymists Key in 1657.

== Poetic influences ==
Vaughan was much indebted to George Herbert, who provided a model for his new-found spiritual life and literary career, showing a "spiritual quickening and the gift of gracious feeling" derived from Herbert.

Archbishop Trench took the view, "As a divine Vaughan may be inferior [to Herbert], but as a poet he is certainly superior." Critics praise Vaughan's use of literary elements. His monosyllables, long-drawn alliterations and ability to compel the reader to rate him as "more than the equal of George Herbert". Yet others say the two are not even comparable, as Herbert is in fact the Master. While these commentators admit that Henry Vaughan's use of words can be superior to Herbert's, they believe his poetry is, in fact, worse. Herbert's superiority is said to rest on his profundity and consistency.

Certainly Vaughan would have never written the way he did without Herbert's posthumous direction. (The latter had died in 1633.) The explicit spiritual influence here is all but proclaimed in the preface to Silex Scintillans. The prose of Vaughan exemplifies this as well. For instance, Herbert's The Temple is often seen as the inspiration and model on which Vaughan created his work. Silex Scintillans is most often classed with this collection of Herbert's, as it borrows the same themes, experience and beliefs. Herbert's influence is evident in the shape and the spirituality of Vaughan's poetry. For example, the opening to Vaughan's poem "Unprofitableness" – "How rich, O Lord! How fresh thy visits are!" – recalls Herbert's 'The Flower':

How fresh, O Lord, how sweet and clean
Are thy returns! ev'n as the flowers in spring

Another work of Vaughan's that parallels Herbert is Mount of Olives, for example in the passage, "Let sensual natures judge as they please, but for my part, I shall hold it no paradoxe to affirme, there are no pleasures in the world. Some coloured griefes of blushing woes there are, which look as clear as if they were true complexions; but it is very sad and tyred truth, that they are but painted." This echoes Herbert's Rose:

In this world of sugar's lies,
And to use a larger measure
Than my strict yet welcome size.
First, there is no pleasure here:
Coloure'd griefs indeed there are,
Blushing woes that look as clear,
As if they could beauty spare.

Critics have argued that Vaughan is enslaved to Herbert's works, using similar "little tricks" such as abrupt introductions and whimsical titles as a framework for his work, and "failing to learn" from Herbert. Vaughan was said to be unable to know his limits and focus more on the intensity of the poem, meanwhile losing the attention of his audience.

Yet Alexander Grosart denies that Vaughan was solely an imitator of Herbert. There are moments when the reader can see Vaughan's true self, where he shows naturalness, immediacy and ability to relate the concrete through poetry. In some cases he draws observations from Herbert's language that are distinctly his own. It is as if Vaughan takes proprietorship of some of Herbert's work, yet makes it unique to himself. Vaughan takes another step away from Herbert in his presentation. Herbert in The Temple – often the source of comparison between the two writers – lays down explicit instructions on its reading. This contrasts with Vaughan's attitude that the experience of reading is the best guide to his meanings, so that he promoted no special reading method.

At these times Vaughan shows himself different from any other poet. Much of the distinction comes from an apparent lack of sympathy with the world about him. His aloof appeal to his surroundings detaches him and displays his love of nature and mysticism. This in turn influenced later poets such as Wordsworth. His mind thinks in terms of a physical and spiritual world and the obscure relation between the two, often moved to original, unfamiliar, remote places reflected in his poetry. He was loyal to the themes of the Anglican Church and religious festivals, but found his true voice in the more mystical themes of eternity, communion with the dead, nature, and childhood. He was a "poet of revelation" who used the Bible, Nature and his own experience to illustrate his vision of eternity. This gives Vaughan's poetry a particularly modern sound.

Alliteration, conspicuous in Welsh poetry, is more commonly used by Vaughan than by most of his contemporaries in English, noticeably in the opening to "The Water-fall".

Vaughan drew on personal loss in two well-known poems: "The World" and "They Are All Gone into the World of Light". Another, "The Retreat", combines the theme of loss with the corruption of childhood, which is yet another consistent theme of his. Vaughan's new-found personal voice and persona are seen to result of the death of a younger brother.

This is an example of an especially beautiful fragment of one of his poems entitled 'The World':

I saw Eternity the other night,
Like a great ring of pure and endless light,

All calm, as it was bright,

And round beneath it, Time in hours, days, years

Driv'n by the spheres

Like a vast shadow mov'd; in which the world

And all her train were hurl'd.

== Death and legacy ==
Henry Vaughan was acclaimed less in his lifetime than after his death, on 23 April 1695 aged 74. He was buried in the churchyard of St Bride's, Llansantffraed, Powys, where he had spent most of his life. The grave is visited by enthusiasts and has been the inspiration for other poets, including Siegfried Sassoon, Roland Mathias and Brian Morris.

Vaughan is recognised as an "example of a poet who can write both graceful and effective prose". He influenced the work of poets such as Wordsworth, Tennyson and Siegfried Sassoon. The American science fiction writer Philip K. Dick also named Vaughan as a key influence.

== Musical settings ==
Several poems by Vaughan from Silex Scintillans have been set to music, including:

- "The Evening-Watch: Dialogue between Body and Soul" by Gustav Holst (1924)
- The Eucharistic poem "Welcome, sweet and sacred feast" set by Gerald Finzi as the anthem Welcome, sweet and sacred feast in Three anthems, Op. 27 (1953)
- Peace, set as the first of Hubert Parry's Songs of Farewell (1916–1918): "My soul, there is a country".
- Several poems set by Daniel Jones in his cantata The Country Beyond the Stars
- "Christ's Nativity" and "Peace" set by the American composer Timothy Hoekman in his 1992 sequence of three songs entitled The Nativity for soprano and orchestra
- "They Are All Gone into the World of Light" set by the British composer Howard Goodall in his 2004 choral work "As Angels in some brighter dreams" and first performed by The Shrewsbury Chorale on 5 June 2004

== Works ==
- Poems, with the Tenth Satire of Juvenal Englished (1646), includes a translation of a Satire by the Latin poet Juvenal.
- Olor Iscanus (1647, published 1651)
- Silex Scintillans (1650 and 1655)
- Mount of Olives, or Solitary Devotions (1652)
- Flores Solitudinis (1654)
- Hermetical Physics (1655), translated from the Latin of Henry Nollius
- The Chymists Key (1657), translated from the Latin of Henry Nollius
- Several translations from the Latin contributed to Thomas Powell's Humane Industry (1661)
- Thalia Rediviva (1678), a joint collection of poetry with his brother Thomas Vaughan, after Thomas's death

== See also ==
- Physician writer
