= Newton Purcell with Shelswell =

Coordinates: 51.965°N 1.101°W

- Civil parish
- Location within Oxfordshire
- Civil parish: Newton Purcell with Shelswell
- District: Cherwell
- Shire county: Oxfordshire
- Region: South East
- Country: England
- Sovereign state: United Kingdom
- Post town: Buckingham
- Postcode district: MK18
- Dialling code: 01280
- Police: Thames Valley
- Fire: Oxfordshire
- Ambulance: South Central
- UK Parliament: Bicester and Woodstock

Newton Purcell with Shelswell is a civil parish in Oxfordshire, England. It was formed in 1932 by merger of the parishes of Newton Purcell (grid reference SP6230) and Shelswell (grid reference SP6030).

== Sources ==
- Lobel, Mary D., ed. (1959). Victoria County History: A History of the County of Oxford: Volume 6.
