= Llansantffraed =

Parish in Powys, Wales

Coordinates: 51.902°N 3.277°W

Llansantffraed, Talybont-on-Usk
- Location within Powys
- Population: 1,422 (2011)
- OS grid reference: SO123235
- Community: Talybont-on-Usk
- Principal area: Powys
- Preserved county: Powys
- Country: Wales
- Sovereign state: United Kingdom
- Post town: BRECON
- Postcode district: LD3
- Dialling code: 01874
- Police: Dyfed-Powys
- Fire: Mid and West Wales
- Ambulance: Welsh
- UK Parliament: Brecon, Radnor and Cwm Tawe
- Senedd Cymru – Welsh Parliament: Brecon and Radnorshire

Llansantffraed (Llansantffraed-juxta-Usk) is a parish in the community of Talybont-on-Usk in Powys, Wales, near Brecon. The benefice of Llansantffraed with Llanrhystud and Llanddeiniol falls within the Diocese of St Davids in the Church in Wales.

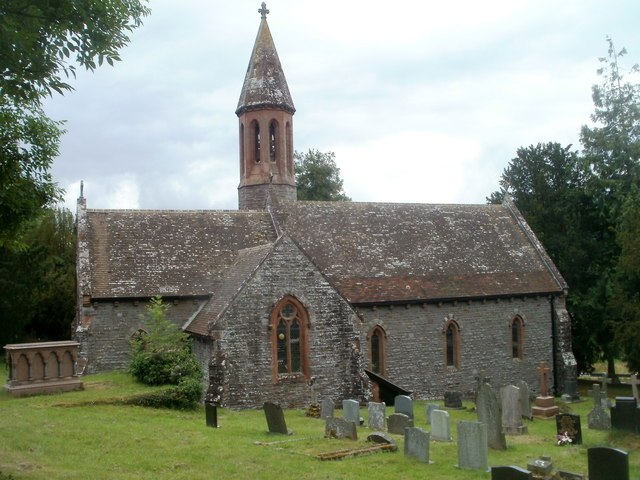
St Fraed's Church

== Church and churchyard ==
The church of St Ffraed is a Grade II listed building. It was largely restored in 1690 and was completely rebuilt in 1885 by the architect Stephen W. Williams.

The parish is the burial place of the poet Henry Vaughan (1621–1695), who was born in the hamlet of Scethrog within the parish. Vaughan's grave in the churchyard, on the slopes of a hill known as Allt yr Esgair or simply The Allt, overlooks the River Usk. The poets Siegfried Sassoon, Roland Mathias, Brian Morris and Anne Cluysenaar were all inspired to write poems by their visits to the grave. Sassoon's "At the Grave of Henry Vaughan" is the best-known of these and is read every year at the graveside following the Vaughan memorial service.

Another grave of note in the churchyard is a Grade II listed tomb erected for the Gwynne-Holford family, residents of nearby Buckland Hall (see below). The family included James Gwynne-Holford, Conservative Member of Parliament for Brecon (died 1886).

Vaughan's twin brother, Thomas Vaughan, became rector of Llansantffraed in about 1644. He was forced to vacate the position in 1650, on grounds that included his having been on the Royalist side during the English Civil War.

== Other buildings ==
The Old Rectory, which stands close by the church to the northwest, is a Grade II listed building, with an estimated date of late 18th century. It is thought to have been built as a hunting lodge for the Buckland estate and converted into a rectory in the 19th century, but was released by the church during the 1950s. It later became a guest house.

=== Buckland Hall ===
Buckland Hall, home of the Gwynne-Holfords, stands in a large park a small distance from the village. It is a Grade II listed building. Its Edwardian garden is listed, also at Grade II, on the Cadw/ICOMOS Register of Parks and Gardens of Special Historic Interest in Wales. The park contains a tennis pavilion, graded at II*, by Henry Avray Tipping.

== Governance ==
An electoral ward with the same name exists. The population of this ward at the 2011 census was 1,880.
