= Fringford =

Village in Oxfordshire, England

Coordinates: 51.953°N 1.123°W

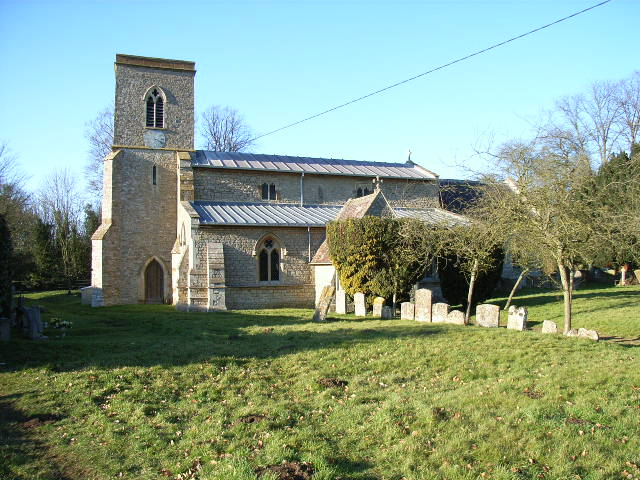
- St. Michael's parish church

- Location within Oxfordshire
- Area: 5.89 km^{2} (2.27 sq mi)
- Population: 602 (2011 census)
  - Density: 102/km^{2} (260/sq mi)
- OS grid reference: SP6028
- Civil parish: Fringford
- District: Cherwell
- Shire county: Oxfordshire
- Region: South East
- Country: England
- Sovereign state: United Kingdom
- Post town: Bicester
- Postcode district: OX27
- Dialling code: 01869
- Police: Thames Valley
- Fire: Oxfordshire
- Ambulance: South Central
- UK Parliament: Bicester and Woodstock
- Website: Fringford Village

Fringford is a village and civil parish in Oxfordshire, about 4 miles (6.4 km) northeast of Bicester. The parish is bounded to the east by the Roman road that linked Alchester Roman Town with Roman Towcester, to the south by a brook that joins the River Bure, to the north mostly by a brook that is a tributary of the River Great Ouse, and to the west by field boundaries. Fringford village is in the north of the parish, surrounded on two sides by a bend in the tributary of the Great Ouse.

The 2011 census recorded the parish's population as 602.

== Archaeology ==
At the southern edge of the parish, beside the tributary of the River Bure, there may have been a Roman villa. The site is only about 200 yards (180 m) west of the Roman road. It is now occupied by Fringford Lodge.

== Manor ==
Fringford's toponym is derived from an Old English tribal or family name Ferring or Fcaring and the ford that formed the only crossing-point of the narrow stream that flows around three sides of the village. An earlier form of the name would have been Ferringas-ford.

After the Norman Conquest of England in 1066, William of Normandy gave his half-brother Odo, Bishop of Bayeux, manors that included Fringford. Later the Crown deposed Odo and granted the manor of Fringford to Baron William de Arsic of Cogges.

== Parish church ==
By the early part of the 12th century William's son Baron Manasses Arsic had built a stone church. It was dedicated to Saint Michael and All Angels and granted to the Benedictine Priory founded at Cogges by Baron William. The south aisle may have been rebuilt in the 14th century.

The west tower has three bells. Robert Atton of Buckingham cast the second bell in 1617. Richard III Chandler of Drayton Parslow cast the treble and tenor bells in 1702. The church has also a Sanctus bell that Robert I Wells of Aldbourne, Wiltshire cast in about 1780.

The only maintenance recorded before the 19th century is in 1788, when £18.4.3d. was spent on general repairs.

In 1815 Henry Dawson Roundell was appointed Rector. He is described as "possessed of ample means and genial temerament". He started letting parts of the parish glebe as allotments for labourers in the parish and, throughout his incumbency, he promoted the restoration of the church. After his incumbency the north aisle was rebuilt in 1905 and the roof was restored in 1909.

The Church of England parish of Fringford is now a member of the Benefice of Shelswell, which includes also the parishes of Cottisford, Finmere, Fringford, Godington, Hardwick, Hethe, Mixbury, Newton Purcell, Stoke Lyne and Stratton Audley. The Rector for Shelswell parishes lives in Finmere. Associate ministers live in Fringford and Bicester, and a further Licensed Lay Minister lives in Fringford.

The ten parishes are part of the Deanery of Bicester and Islip, and the Dorchester Episcopal Area of the Diocese of Oxford.

== Social and economic history ==
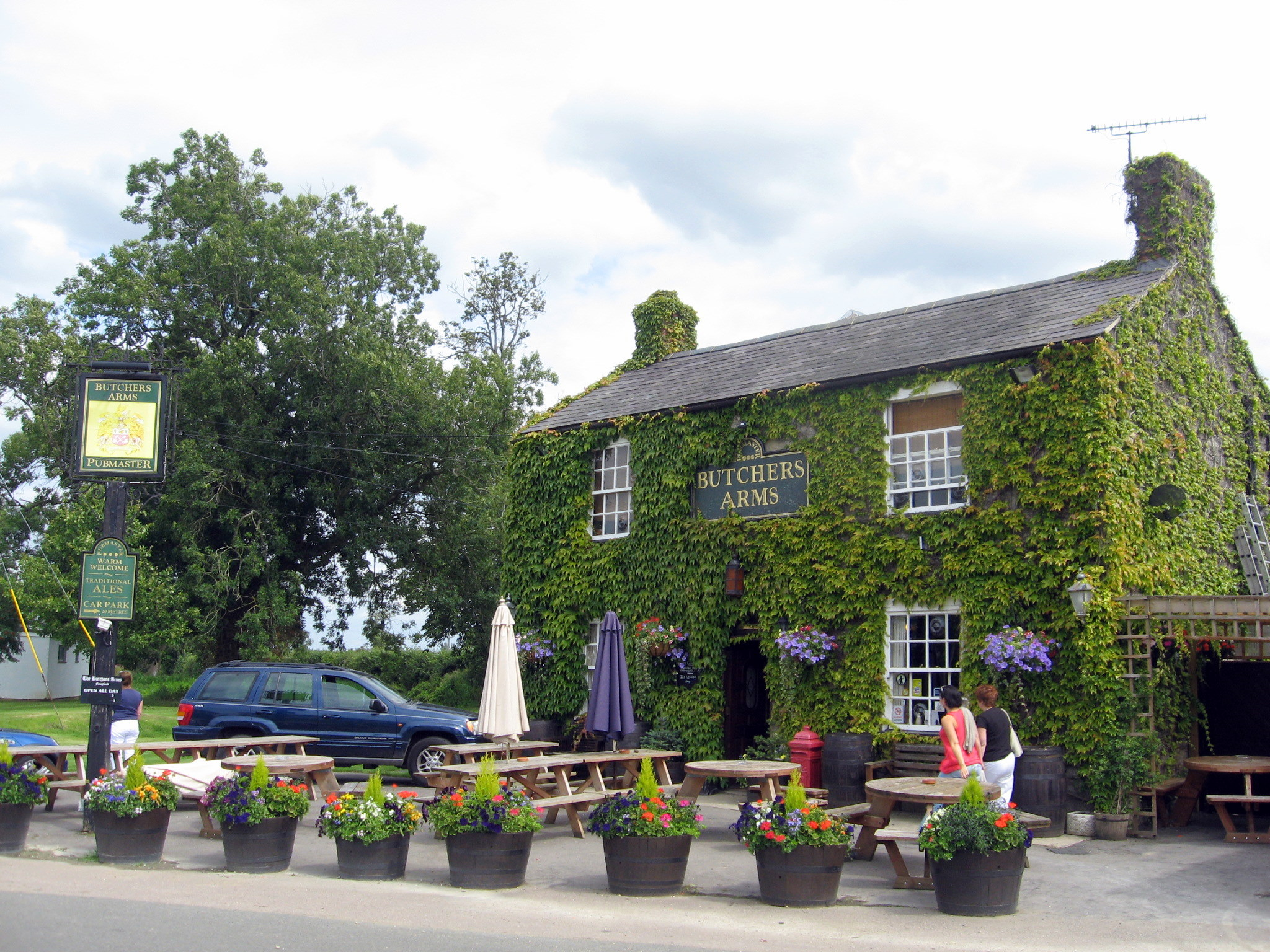
The Butchers Arms

Fringford in the 19th century is associated with Flora Thompson's Lark Rise to Candleford trilogy, in which Fringford is the prototype for Candleford Green. In 1844 the Oxford Chronicle noted "there aren't enough dwellings to shelter the poor". In 1851 the population was 357. During this time the parish had only a few good farm-houses. The population peaked at 479 in 1871, its highest number until the 1990s.

Fringford had five blacksmiths, three carpenters, three sawyers, three brickmakers, a stonemason, a shoemaker, three decorators, a carrier, a coal haulier, two bakers, two grocers and a butcher. Also two grooms, two footmen, six gardeners and a coachman from Fringford were employed at Shelswell House, Tusmore Park and Swift House.

Mains electricity was not supplied until after the Second World War and mains water until 1960.

== Amenities ==
Fringford Church of England Primary School had, as of 2021, 101 pupils. In 2020, the school won an award from the Woodland Trust for its environmental work. Fringford has one public house, the Butchers Arms. Shelswell Women's Institute meets in Fringford.

== Sources and further reading ==
- Blomfield, James Charles (c. 1890). Part V: History of Fringford, Hethe, Mixbury, Newton Purcell, and Shelswell. Deanery of Bicester. London: Elliot Stock & Co.
- Greenwood, Martin W (2000). Fringford Through the Ages. Martin Greenwood. ISBN 0-9539627-0-9.
- Lobel, Mary D, ed. (1959). A History of the County of Oxford. Victoria County History. Vol. 6: Ploughley Hundred. London: Oxford University Press for the Institute of Historical Research. pp. 125–134.
- Sherwood, Jennifer; Pevsner, Nikolaus (1974). Oxfordshire. The Buildings of England. Harmondsworth: Penguin Books. pp. 607–608. ISBN 0-14-071045-0.
