= Newton Purcell =

Village in Oxfordshire, England

Coordinates: 51.975°N 01.090°W

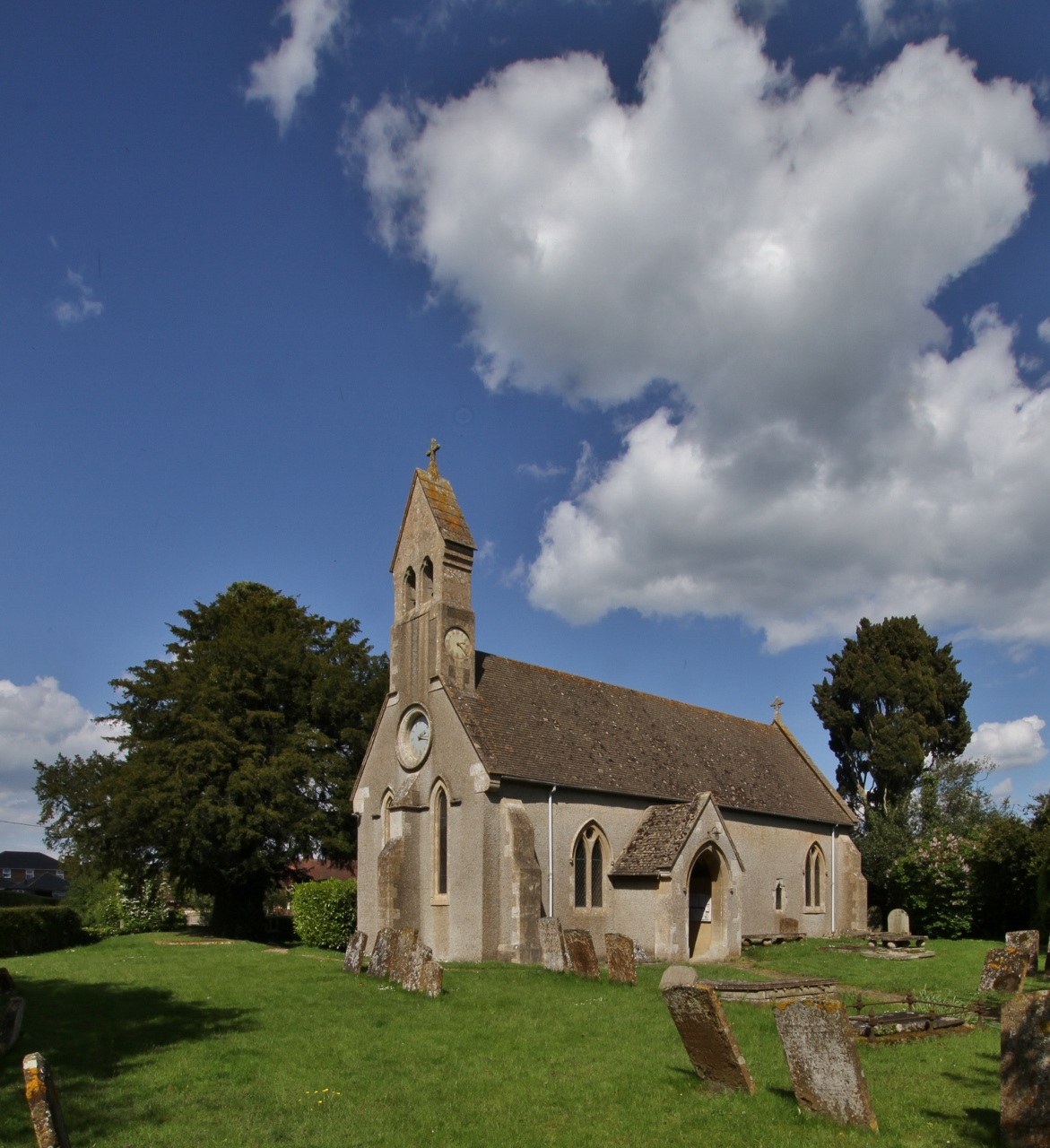
- St Michael and All Angels parish church

- Location within Oxfordshire
- Population: 103 (parish, with Shelswell) (2001 Census)
- OS grid reference: SP6230
- Civil parish: Newton Purcell with Shelswell
- District: Cherwell
- Shire county: Oxfordshire
- Region: South East
- Country: England
- Sovereign state: United Kingdom
- Post town: Buckingham
- Postcode district: MK18
- Dialling code: 01280
- Police: Thames Valley
- Fire: Oxfordshire
- Ambulance: South Central
- UK Parliament: Banbury

Newton Purcell is a village in the civil parish of Newton Purcell with Shelswell, in the Cherwell district, in the county of Oxfordshire, England, 4 1/2 miles (7 km) southeast of Brackley in neighbouring Northamptonshire. The 2001 Census recorded a parish population of 103. The parish population from the 2011 Census is not available.

== Early history ==
The course of the Roman road that linked Alchester near Bicester with Lactodurum (now Towcester) runs through the parish just east of the village. The modern road that mostly follows its course is classified as the A4421.

== Toponym ==
The Domesday Book in 1086 does not mention Newton Purcell. The earliest known written record of Newton Purcell is a document from AD 1180 which records the place-name as Neuwenton. An entry in the Book of Fees from 1198 records it as Niweton. A Charter Roll from 1245 records it as Neuton Purcel. "Newton" is one of the commonest place-names in English. It is derived from the Old English nēowa tūn meaning "new homestead" or "new village".

== Manor ==
The manor was created in the 12th century for the Purcel family, mainly with land from two neighbouring manors: Mixbury and Fringford. These manors had different overlords, and as a result the Purcels had feudal obligations to both. Mixbury was part of the honour of St Valery, which later became part of the Honour of Wallingford.

In 1213 Robert de St Valery gave the mesne lordship of Mixbury to the Augustinian Osney Abbey, and the Purcels and their successors had to pay the abbey rent until the Dissolution of the Monasteries in 1536. In 1475 the manor was still held by a Thomas Purcel, but it had left the family by 1523.

The Purcels had a moated manor house. The house has not survived, but in the 1950s fragments of its moat and a mound where it stood were still visible just east of the village.

== Parish church ==
Architectural evidence suggests that the Church of England parish church of Saint Michael and All Angels was a Norman church built in the middle of the 12th century. The earliest documentary evidence of the church's existence is slightly later, when Ralph Purcel granted the church to the Augustinian Bicester Priory in 1200. Of this original church little survives except a 12th-century Norman doorway and a 13th-century piscina.

In 1813 the church was repaired and most of its original features were destroyed. In 1875 the architect CN Beazley restored the building and added the vestry, bell-gable and south porch. St Michael's rectory was built in 1844. St Michael's parish is now part of the Shelswell benefice.

== Economic and social history ==
The parish was still being farmed under the open field system in 1679. There was no Act of Parliament for the parish's enclosure, so it must have been done by agreement. This may have been before the end of the 17th century.

The village's Church of England school was built in 1872 and enlarged in 1898. It was reorganised as a junior school in 1929 and was still open in 1954.

In 1899 the Great Central Railway completed its main line to London through the eastern part of the then Shelswell parish and built Finmere for Buckingham station where the line crosses the main road about 1/2 mile (800 m) northeast of Newton Purcell. Buckingham was almost 5 miles (8 km) from the Great Central station, so the name was subsequently shortened to the more appropriate "Finmere". British Railways closed Finmere station in 1963, and closed the section of the Great Central line through the station and parish in 1966.

In 1931 the civil parish had a population of 99. On 1 April 1932 the parish was merged with neighbouring Shelswell to form "Newton Purcell with Shelswell".

== Amenities ==
Newton Purcell had one pub, the Shelswell Inn, it was on the main road near the site of the former railway station. It has now closed.

== Bibliography ==
- Blomfield, James Charles (c. 1890). Part V: History of Fringford, Hethe, Mixbury, Newton Purcell, and Shelswell. Deanery of Bicester. Elliot Stock & Co: London.
- Lobel, Mary D, ed. (1959). "Newton Purcell". A History of the County of Oxford. Victoria County History. Vol. 6: Ploughley Hundred. London: Oxford University Press for the Institute of Historical Research. pp. 262–267.
- Ekwall, Eilert (1960) [1936]. Concise Oxford Dictionary of English Place-Names (4th ed.). Oxford: Oxford University Press. Newton. ISBN 0198691033.
- Sherwood, Jennifer; Pevsner, Nikolaus (1974). Oxfordshire. The Buildings of England. Harmondsworth: Penguin Books. p. 717. ISBN 0-14-071045-0.
