= Tingewick =

Village in Buckinghamshire, England

Coordinates: 51.990°N 1.044°W

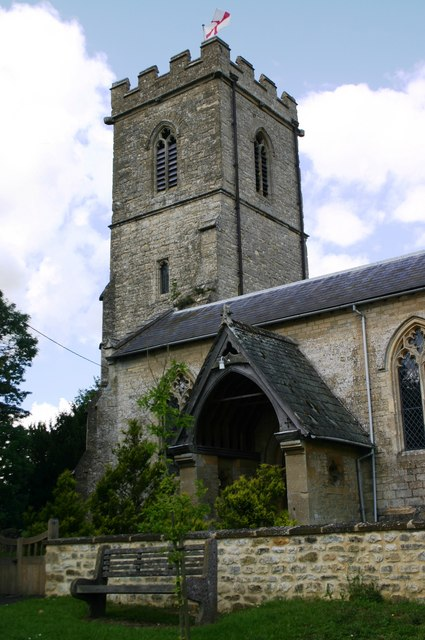
- St. Mary Magdalene parish church

- Location within Buckinghamshire
- Population: 1,093 (2011 Census)
- OS grid reference: SP656328
- Civil parish: Tingewick
- Unitary authority: Buckinghamshire
- Ceremonial county: Buckinghamshire
- Region: South East
- Country: England
- Sovereign state: United Kingdom
- Post town: Buckingham
- Postcode district: MK18
- Dialling code: 01280
- Police: Thames Valley
- Fire: Buckinghamshire
- Ambulance: South Central
- UK Parliament: Buckingham and Bletchley
- Website: Tingewick Parish Website

Tingewick is a village and civil parish about 2.5 miles (4.0 km) west of Buckingham in the unitary authority and county of Buckinghamshire, England. It is bounded to the north by the River Great Ouse, to the east by a tributary, to the west by a northern part of Oxfordshire and to the south by field boundaries.

The village formerly straddled the A421, bypassed since 1998 by its local dual carriageway.

The parish comprises about 2,300 acres (930 ha) of arable fields and pasture with the residual woodland similar in extent to the volume of homes with gardens.

== Homes ==
Part of the village is a Conservation Area; 27 of the approximately 548 dwellings are listed buildings.. Before adding the village's newest homes, two earlier main growth spurts took place; between 1821 and 1851 which saw the number of houses rise from 80 to 205; and between 1931 and 20 years later, when the number of households rose from 171 to 235.

== History ==
The remains of a Roman villa provide evidence of early habitation in the parish. It is about 440 yards (400 m) northeast of the village, about 200 yards (180 m) from the river and lies east of Tingewick Mill. The villa was partly excavated in 1860–62.

The toponym is a simplified corruption of Old English Teod[a]'s farmstead or farm; the Domesday Book of 1086, a book which usually uses "ch" or "che" instead of "k", records the village as Tedinwiche.

The earliest part of the Church of England parish church of Saint Mary Magdalene are the walls and floor of the Norman 12th century nave. The three-bay north aisle was added in about 1200. The Perpendicular gothic chancel and bell-tower were added late in the 15th century. The north aisle was altered in the 17th century, the south aisle was added in 1830 and the south porch in 1867.

The tower has a ring of five bells. The oldest was cast in London in about 1490 and is inscribed Nomen Magdalene Campana Gerit Melodie. The second bell was cast by Bartholomew Atton of Buckingham in 1591. Robert Atton of Buckingham cast the fourth bell in 1623 and the treble bell in 1627. The youngest bell in the ring is the tenor, cast by Henry Bagley III of Chacombe and Witney in 1721.

== Amenities ==
The village has no pubs or restaurants – the Royal Oak closed to custom in 2024 as did The Crown, a low category listed building in 2013. Tingewick has a village hall, a Post Office and village shop, a pottery, an animal feed warehouse and a farm supplies depot.

Roundwood Primary School, is the merger of Tingewick and Gawcott infant schools.

The village held three large charity concerts called 'Party in the Paddock' in 2004, 2005 and 2008. The event has included acts such as Bernie Marsden, Roger Daltrey (The Who), Zak Starkey, Marillion and Don Airey.

Tingewick Meadows is a Site of Special Scientific Interest south of the village.

== Sport ==
Grand tourer (GT) team Steller Motorsport are based in Tingewick. They compete in the GT World Challenge Europe Sprint Cup, and the British GT Championship.

== Sources ==
- Page, William, ed. (1927). Victoria County History: A History of the County of Buckingham, Volume 4. pp. 249–251.
- Pevsner, Nikolaus (1973) [1960]. The Buildings of England: Buckinghamshire. Harmondsworth: Penguin Books. pp. 268–269. ISBN 0-14-071019-1.
