= Finmere railway station =

Former GCML Railway Station in Oxfordshire

Coordinates: 51.9762°N 1.0856°W

Finmere
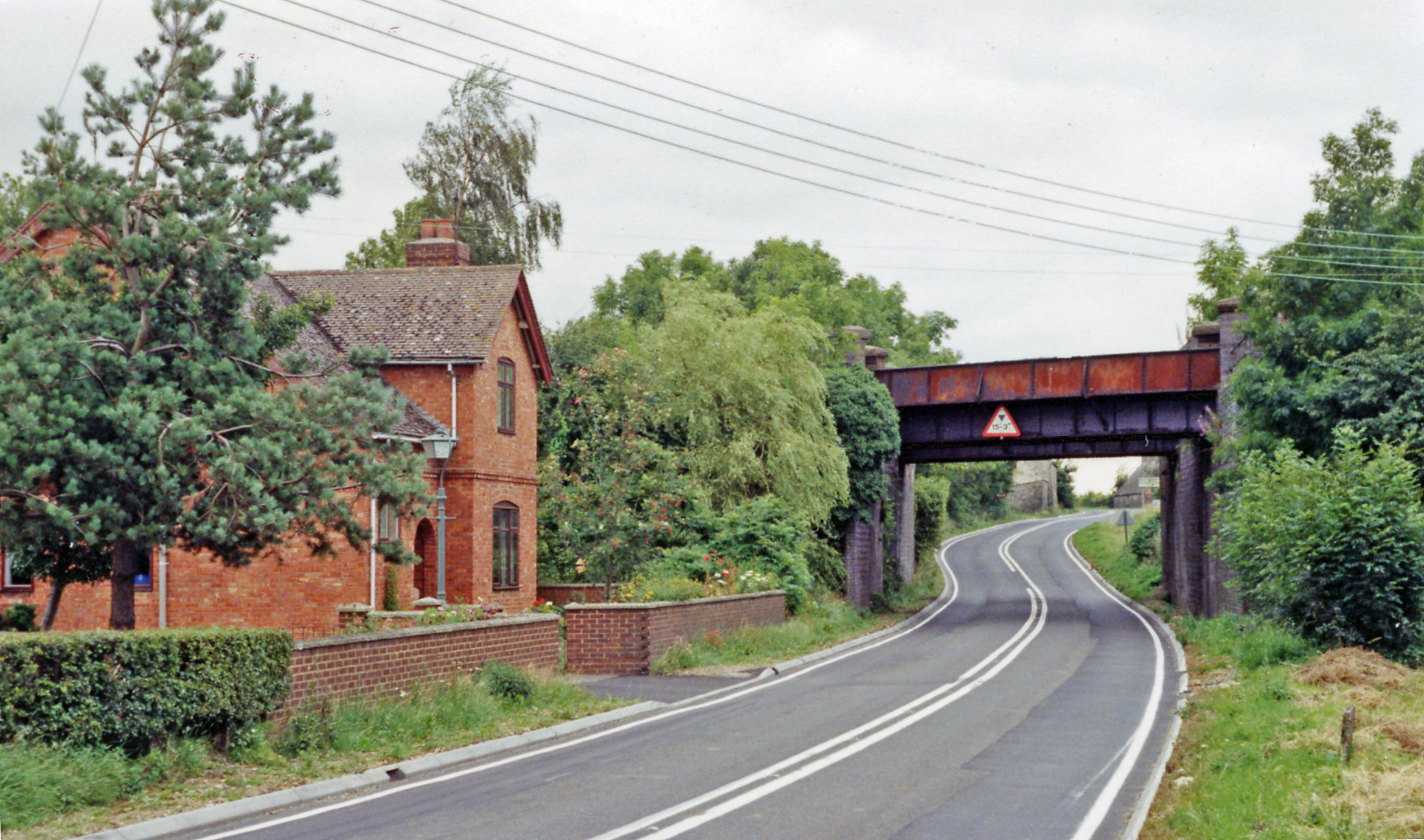
- Stationmaster's house and railway overbridge in 1991.

General information
- Location: Newton Purcell, Cherwell; England
- Grid reference: SP629313
- Platforms: 2

Other information
- Status: Disused

History
- Original company: Great Central Railway
- Pre-grouping: Great Central Railway
- Post-grouping: London and North Eastern Railway; London Midland Region of British Railways

Key dates
- 15 March 1899: Opened (Finmere for Buckingham)
- c. 1922: Renamed
- 4 March 1963: Closed to passengers
- 5 October 1964: Closed to goods
Location

Finmere was a railway station on the former Great Central Main Line which ran between Manchester London Road and London Marylebone. It was opened in 1899 and served the nearby village of Finmere. The station was closed in 1963 and the line through it was closed in 1966.

== History ==
=== Construction and opening ===
Finmere station was on the Great Central Main Line, the last English main line - built in 1899, and the first to be closed in 1966. The section of the line between Brackley Central and Quainton Road was to be constructed by Walter Scott & Co., civil engineers from Newcastle-upon-Tyne at a cost of £420,000. The construction of the section through Finmere necessitated considerable earthworks, the remains of which can still be seen today. To the north, a cutting of 180,000 cubic yards had to be excavated, while to the south the railway crossed an embankment which required the excavation of nearly 200,000 cubic yards. The earthworks were required as a consequence of the Great Central's policy to eliminate level crossings on the London Extension, regarding them as a source of danger, inconvenience and cost. This resulted in the construction of bridges for crossings both large and small, including a timber overbridge to the north of Finmere for the convenience of the local Grafton Hunt.

Opened in March 1899, Finmere typified the Great Central's style of station which was reached via a flight of steps leading up from the centre of a road underbridge, each track having a separate bridge span. A house was provided for the stationmaster and land set aside for the future provision of railway cottages. At a distance of 54.5 miles (87.7 km) from Marylebone and 0.75 miles (1.21 km) from Finmere village, the station had a small goods yard with a cattle pen, coal staithes and a goods store. The station was originally named "Finmere for Buckingham", but as Buckingham was 5 miles (8.0 km) away and served by the LNWR's Buckingham station, it was hardly convenient to alight at Finmere in order to reach the historic county town. Traps waited under the shelter of the road underbridge to ferry passengers to their destinations. Local entrepreneurs soon took advantage of the railway's presence to launch new ventures - a livestock market was opened on land adjacent to the station by Paxton & Holiday, while construction of the Shelswell Inn began in May 1900. A further bonus for the railway was the opening of Stowe School in 1923; the school's nearest main-line station was Finmere and it provided a useful form of transport for staff and pupils alike. Buckingham station was far closer physically, but not on a main line.

=== Operations ===
The station became a popular alighting place for day-trippers from London and two or three special services ran on Sundays bringing as many as fifty or sixty excursionists to the area who often found they had to walk the four miles to Buckingham in the absence of local conveyances. A slip coach service to Buckingham was introduced in 1923 to take advantage of the wealthy and prominent commuters who were now living in the area; these included Admiral Roger Keyes and Captain Ferrass Loftus who both lived at Tingewick, the banker L. Fleischmann of Chetwode Manor and Charles William Trotter, a director of the LNER who lived at Barton Hartshorn Manor.

A slip coach on the 18.20 from Marylebone reached Finmere at 19.28, the guard releasing the last carriage as the service approached the station and this carriage braking as it entered Finmere which enabled expresses to continue without stopping. After setting down at Finmere, slip coaches were worked forward to Woodford Halse. The fastest service to Marylebone from Finmere in 1922 took one hour and nine minutes on an express which only stopped at Aylesbury, although the first service of the day took slightly longer, departing at 07.59 and not arriving in Marylebone until 09.48.

=== Decline and closure ===
Although the station saw regular use during the Second World War due to its proximity to military camps and airfields, patronage began to decline after the war in the face of increased competition from buses and the private motorcar. Eventually, the only really busy periods came at the start and end of the school terms at Stowe. Proposals to close the station circulated by the British Transport Commission in 1961 and Finmere Parish Council joined with Oxfordshire County Council in objecting to closure. It subsequently closed to passenger traffic in March 1963, goods facilities being withdrawn a year later. After the station closed trains continue to pass through it until closure of the Great Central Main Line in September 1966.

Preceding station	Disused railways	Following station
Calvert; Line and station closed	Great Central Railway; London Extension	Brackley Central; Line and station closed

== Present day ==
The twin road overbridge survived until 2021, although in an overgrown state. The route chosen for HS2 passes through the site of Finmere station.

Until 2020 the station site was owned by the Coulsdon Old Vehicle & Engineering Society, which initially used it for the storage of vintage road vehicles, but subsequently brought it back into rail use. A running line has been laid using track from the East London Line project and rolling stock brought on to the site, including Class 73/1 No. 73130, and two ex- 2EPB units. More recently a 4CIG unit, No. 1753, has been acquired.

The station was opened to the public for the first time during 13–14 August 2016 by the Network SouthEast Railway Society (NSERS), which marked the 30th anniversary of its namesake passenger sector by staging a special gala at Finmere. The NSERS's Honorary President and former Network SouthEast (NSE) managing director, Chris Green, unveiled a nameplate in his honour on 4CIG's MBSO No. 62043. He also inaugurated the NSERS's mobile museum housed in a modified ISO container in NSE livery and numbered ADB 300778-4, which is now located at East Kent Railway Shepherdswell. The site remained private and was only open on selected days or by prior arrangement.

In January 2020 the station site was vacated by NSERS and handed over to HS2. In June 2021, it was announced that the two derelict railway bridges would be removed during road closures on the middle weekends of July 2021.
