= Shelswell =

Hamlet in Oxfordshire, England

Coordinates: 51.967°N 01.117°W

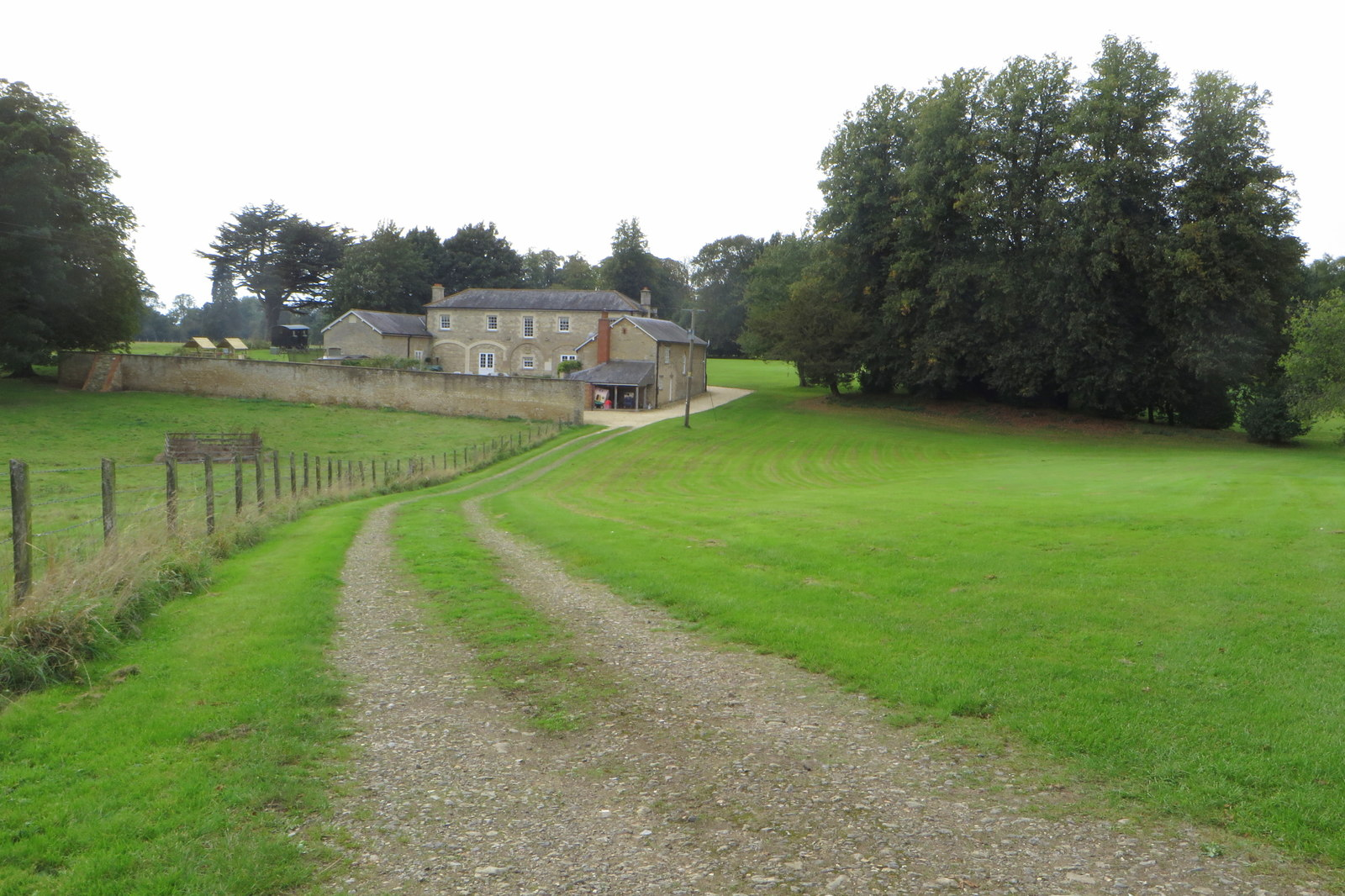
- Shelswell House

- Location within Oxfordshire
- OS grid reference: SP6130
- Civil parish: Newton Purcell with Shelswell
- District: Cherwell
- Shire county: Oxfordshire
- Region: South East
- Country: England
- Sovereign state: United Kingdom
- Post town: Bicester
- Postcode district: OX27
- Dialling code: 01280
- Police: Thames Valley
- Fire: Oxfordshire
- Ambulance: South Central
- UK Parliament: Banbury

Shelswell is a hamlet in the civil parish of Newton Purcell with Shelswell, in the Cherwell district, in the county of Oxfordshire, England. It is about 4 miles (6.4 km) south of Brackley in neighbouring Northamptonshire.

== Manor ==
Shelswell's toponym comes from Old English and suggests that the settlement may originally have been the well belonging to Scield, a Saxon settler. The spring that gave rise to this well is no longer traceable. The toponym was "Scaldeswelle" in 1180 and "Saldeywell" in 1219 before evolving into the present form.

Before the Norman Conquest of England the manor of Shelswell belonged to a Saxon called Edwin, but the Domesday Book records that by 1086 Shelswell had been granted to Geoffrey de Montbray, Bishop of Coutances. In 1093 the Bishop left Shelswell to his nephew Robert de Mowbray, Earl of Northumbria, but in 1095 the Earl was imprisoned and forfeited his estates for rebelling against William Rufus. By the 12th century Robert, 1st Earl of Gloucester, an illegitimate son of Henry I, was Shelswell's feudal overlord. Shelswell remained part of the honour of Gloucester during the 13th century and apparently as late as 1560. Sir Anthony Cope, 1st Baronet of Hanwell, Oxfordshire bought Shelswell in 1595 and it remained with the family of the Cope baronets until after 1675.

Shelswell had a medieval manor house that still stood in 1530. Moats near Home Farm may mark its site. A new manor house southwest of the former village was built either early in the 18th century according to record or in 1699 according to a date-stone found in 1875. In the 18th century that house was enlarged and plantations made to improve its parkland. In 1875, the house was almost completely demolished and replaced with Shelswell Park's present Italianate country house designed by the architect William Wilkinson. The house has a Tuscan porte-cochère and retains some rooms of the 18th-century house. In 1956 the 1875 house was unoccupied and falling into disrepair.

== Parish church ==
Shelswell had a parish church before the end of the 11th century, and its dedication to the Northumbrian Saint Ebbe reflects the Earl of Northumbria's feudal overlordship of the manor from 1093 until 1095. From 1573 the Benefice was held with that of neighbouring Newton Purcell, and Shelswell was usually referred to as a chapel of the latter. St. Ebbe's was still standing in 1618 but became increasingly dilapidated in the 18th century and was demolished in either 1796 or 1810. Two 17th-century or late 16th-century figures from the church have been preserved and are in Shelswell Park northeast of the house.

Late in the 20th century a Church of England benefice comprising Newton Purcell and nine other local parishes was established and named after Shelswell.

== Economic and social history ==
Shelswell was a poor parish and during the Middle Ages its population tended to decline. Its lands were enclosed in different stages. In 1497 the husband of the lady of the manor evicted people, demolished two houses and enclosed 60 acres (24 ha) of land for arable farming. By 1528 another landowner had made further evictions and enclosures and in 1533 Brasenose College, Oxford bought a 90 acres (36 ha) farm in the parish. By 1601 Shelswell's enclosures were complete. In 1634 the parsonage was still standing but unoccupied. No building from the former village survives today.

In 1899 the Great Central Railway built its main line to London through the eastern part of the then Shelswell parish and built Finmere for Buckingham station where the line crosses the main road about 0.5 miles (800 m) northeast of Newton Purcell. Buckingham was almost 5 miles (8.0 km) from the Great Central station, so the name was subsequently shortened to the more appropriate "Finmere". British Railways closed Finmere station in 1963, and closed the section of the Great Central line through the station and parish in 1966.

In 1931 the parish had a population of 31. On 1 April 1932 the parish was abolished and merged with Newton Purcell to form "Newton Purcell with Shelswell".

In 1939 the novelist Flora Thompson used Sheldon Park as the basis of "Skeldon Park" in Lark Rise, the first book of her Lark Rise to Candleford trilogy.

== Sources and further reading ==
- Blomfield, James Charles (c. 1890). Part V: History of Fringford, Hethe, Mixbury, Newton Purcell, and Shelswell. Deanery of Bicester. Elliot Stock & Co: London.
- Lobel, Mary D, ed. (1959). A History of the County of Oxford: Volume 6. Victoria County History. pp. 285–289.
- Sherwood, Jennifer; Pevsner, Nikolaus (1974). The Buildings of England: Oxfordshire. Harmondsworth: Penguin Books. p. 753. ISBN 0-14-071045-0.
