= Cottisford =

Village in Oxfordshire, England

Coordinates: 51.979°N 1.140°W

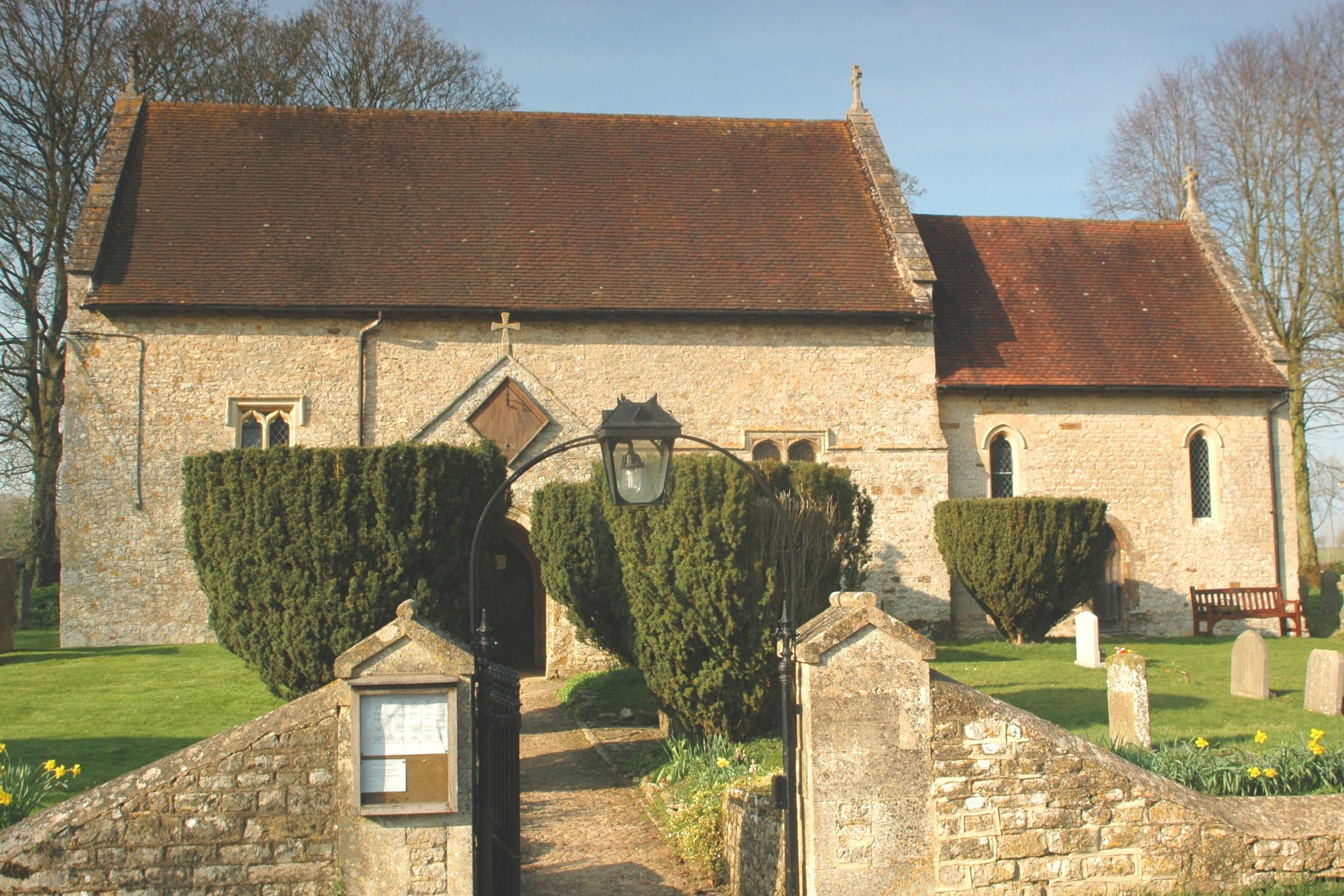
- St. Mary the Virgin parish church

- Location within Oxfordshire
- Area: 11.73 km^{2} (4.53 sq mi)
- Population: 216 (parish, including Juniper Hill and parish of Hardwick with Tusmore) (2011 Census)
  - Density: 18/km^{2} (47/sq mi)
- OS grid reference: SP5831
- Civil parish: Cottisford
- District: Cherwell
- Shire county: Oxfordshire
- Region: South East
- Country: England
- Sovereign state: United Kingdom
- Post town: Brackley
- Postcode district: NN13
- Dialling code: 01280
- Police: Thames Valley
- Fire: Oxfordshire
- Ambulance: South Central
- UK Parliament: Bicester and Woodstock

Cottisford is a village and civil parish in Oxfordshire, about 3.5 miles (5.6 km) south of Brackley in neighbouring Northamptonshire. The parish's northern and northwestern boundaries form part of the boundary between the two counties. The parish includes the hamlet of Juniper Hill about 1 mile (1.6 km) northwest of Cottisford. The 2011 Census recorded the parish's population as 216.

The village stands beside Crowell Brook, which is a stream that passes the villages of Hethe, Fringford and Godington before entering Buckinghamshire where it becomes part of Padbury Brook, a tributary of the Great Ouse. Cottisford's toponym refers to a former ford across Crowell Brook. In the 13th century the village was called Wolfheysford or Urlfesford.

== Manor ==
The Domesday Book records that in 1086 Hugh de Grandmesnil was feudal overlord of Cottisford Manor and his son-in-law Roger d'Ivry was the lord of the manor. After d'Ivry's death his widow Adeline gave Cottisford to the Benedictine Abbey of Bec in Normandy. Bec Abbey owned Ogbourne Priory in Wiltshire, which administered many of the abbey's English manors including Cottisford.

Ogbourne was an alien priory, i.e. it belonged to an abbey outside the English realm. In 1404 Henry IV was planning a military campaign in France so he granted Ogbourne Priory and all its manors jointly to his son John of Lancaster, the churchman Thomas Langley and the Prior of Ogbourne: William de Saint Vaast. The Prior died soon afterwards; in 1414 Henry V suppressed the priory and by 1422 Thomas Langley had surrendered his share of the rights to the manors to John of Lancaster, whom Henry V had made Duke of Bedford.

In 1435 the Duke died and in 1438 Henry VI granted Cottisford to his uncle Humphrey, Duke of Gloucester. However, in 1440 Henry VI founded Eton College and the following year he granted Cottisford to the new school. For several centuries the school leased out the manor to successive tenants who were lords of the manor. In 1885 the school sold the manor house and Warren Farm, and in 1921–22 it sold the remainder of its Cottisford estate.

By the late part of the 14th century Ogbourne Priory was leasing out Cottisford Manor. Eton College continued the practice, commonly granting leases of 21 or 20 years. Richard Eyre, a son of the Reverend Richard Eyre, Prebendary of Salisbury Cathedral 1710–45, obtained a lease on the manor in 1739 and renewed it in 1752. The younger Richard had spent 28 years working for the East India Company and became "a power in the village life" at Cottisford. In 1760, the year before Richard junior died, the school granted a lease to Thomas Bramston from Skreens in Essex and Richard junior's nephew Sir James Eyre. Bramston was a barrister at the Middle Temple in London; Sir James was Chief Justice of the Common Pleas. However Richard Eyre's widow Martha Eyre remained at the manor house until her death in 1772, and the following year the lease was sold by order of her executors.

The buyer was the Reverend John Russell Greenhill, Rector of Fringford, who held the lease until his death in 1813. His son Robert Greenhill-Russell, Member of Parliament for Thirsk, inherited the lease but gave it up in 1825. A succession of tenants then owned the lease until 1885, when the school sold the freehold of the manor house and Warren Farm to its tenant, Edwards Rousby. His son FR Rousby inherited the estate but later sold it to Robert Brooke-Popham.

Manor Farm is a 14th-century manor house built of rubble masonry. Surviving 14th century details include two windows and an octagonal chimneystack. Four more windows date from the 15th century. The house has a solar and originally had a medieval hall, but in the 16th century an intermediate floor was inserted to create upstairs rooms. Also in the 16th century a south wing containing a parlour was added. The house was enlarged again in the 19th century. A 12th-century window in the north gable of the house is not original to the house and must have been salvaged from a building elsewhere. The house is a Grade I listed building. On Crowell Brook just below Manor Farm is a set of fishponds, the earliest record of which is from 1325.

Cottisford House is a newer manor house built before 1707. It is of coursed rubble with ashlar quoins and has a hipped roof with attic dormers. William Turner, who leased the house from 1825, had the house altered and enlarged in about 1830. In its grounds is a square dovecote.

== Other estates ==
The Benedictine Abbey of Saint-Pierre-sur-Dives owned one hide of land at Cottisford until 1237, when it granted the estate to the Cistercian Biddlesden Abbey in Buckinghamshire. Some time after 1266 Biddlesden quitclaimed the hide to the Abbey of Bec, which continued to let it separately from the main manor that it controlled through Ogbourne Priory.

In 1527 a member of the Fermor family of Somerton bought six yardlands of land at Cottisford. The land was later sold but Thomas Fermor (died 1580), lord of the manor of Hardwick retained grazing rights on the land after its sale. Anthony Cope of Hanwell Castle owned the estate by 1606, in which year he also bought another 360 acres (150 ha) of land at Cottisford. At some point the Cope baronets sold their land at Cottisford, and by the early part of the 18th century the Fermors, then living at adjacent Tusmore Park, owned 23 yardlands at Cottisford including the former Cope estate. When Henry Howard, 2nd Earl of Effingham bought the Fermors' Tusmore estate in 1857 it included the land at Cottisford. His heir Henry Howard, 3rd Earl of Effingham died in 1898, and between then and 1920 Henry Howard, 4th Earl of Effingham broke up and sold the estate at Cottisford.

== Parish church ==
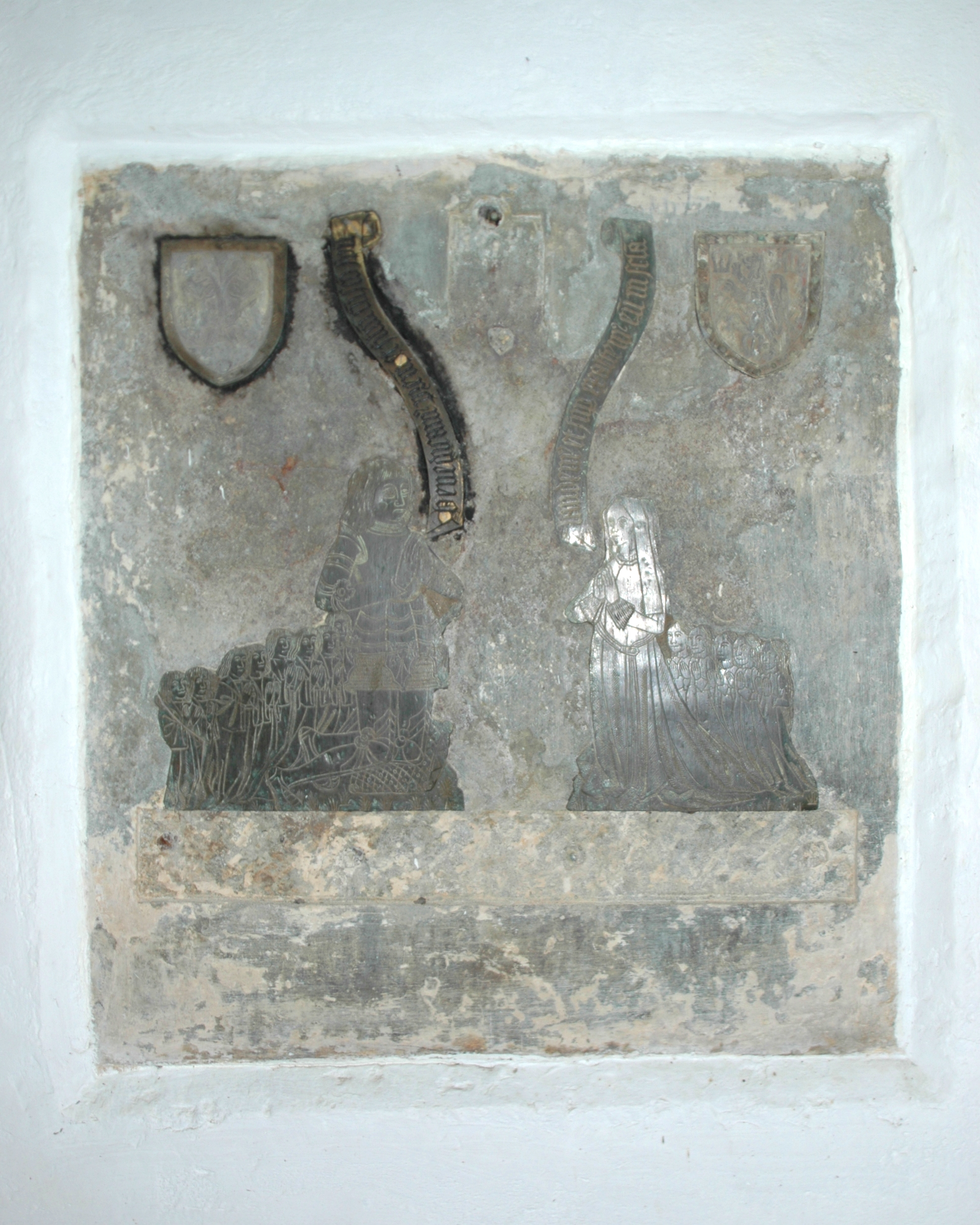
Monumental brass in St Mary's commemorating James Samewell and his wife, circa 1500

It has been suggested that parts of the Church of England parish church of Saint Mary the Virgin may be Saxon. It has proportions like those of a Saxon church: long and narrow, and taller than it is wide. The quoins at all four corners of the building are a puzzle. On the one hand they are a mixture of long flat slabs and tall narrow blocks, like Saxon quoins in many other buildings. On the other hand, the quoins are not laid in the strict long-and-short alternation diagnostic of Saxon work.

All the windows are certainly later work, but in the nave the windows in the west wall and in the western parts of the north and south walls are high up, in positions similar to where Saxon windows would have been positioned. Low down in the east wall is a blocked arch very roughly made of uneven stones. It is of such rough workmanship that it could be from any period, but if it were Saxon it would be the wall of a porticus.

Cottisford certainly had a parish church by 1081, when Hugh de Grandmesnil gave it, along with its tithe income and a hide of land, to the Benedictine Abbey of Saint-Evroul-sur-Ouche. In 1167 St. Evroul Abbey transferred its property, tithes and land at Cottisford to Bec Abbey, which by then owned the manor of Cottisford.

St. Mary's was rebuilt in the 13th century. It is a small building with only a nave, chancel and south porch. The porch is Early English Gothic and has a sundial. The east window of the chancel dates from about 1300. The Gothic Revival architect Charles Buckeridge restored the building in 1861 and the present font was added at the same time. There is no bell tower but there is a belfry in the apex of the roof. The church had two bells in the 16th century. These have not remained but the church now has two bells cast in 1710 and 1858 and a small 17th century sanctus bell. In the churchyard are the base and shaft of a medieval stone cross. St. Mary's is a Grade II* listed building.

St. Mary's is now part of the Shelswell group of parishes.

== Social and economic history ==
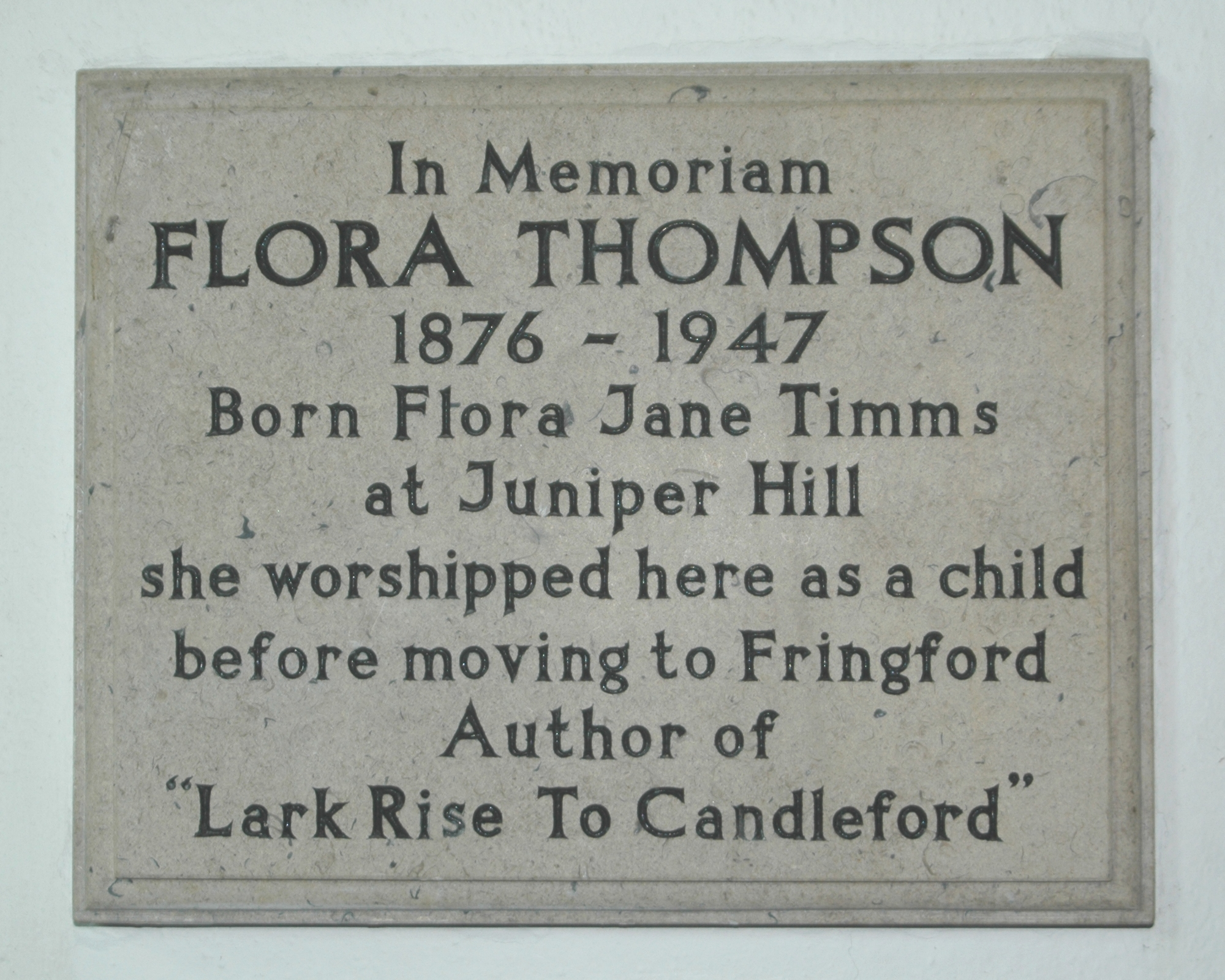
Wall plaque in St Mary's commemorating Flora Thompson

A watermill was built in about 1230, presumably on Crowell Brook. In 1292 the parish had both the watermill and a windmill. Neither mill's fate is clear, but by the second half of the 18th century the estate seems to have been using a mill at Fringford instead.

An open field system of farming prevailed in the parish until 1854. Attempts by successive lords of the manor to get Parliament to pass an inclosure act for Cottisford's common lands were defeated in 1761, 1777 and 1809. Parliament finally passed an inclosure act for the parish in 1848 but the enclosure award to redistribute the land was not settled until 1854.

The enclosure award included setting aside a plot of land for a village school. In 1856 the school and adjoining schoolmistress's cottage were built with funds provided by Eton College. The parish church ran it as a National School until it closed in 1920. Oxfordshire County Council reopened it as a county school in 1924 and reorganised it as a junior school in 1929. It was still open in 1954 but has since been closed.

The author Flora Thompson (1876–1947) grew up in Juniper Hill and was a pupil at Cottisford School. She wrote the Lark Rise to Candleford trilogy of novels, in which she modelled the village of "Fordlow" on Cottisford.

== Sources and further reading ==
- Blomfield, James Charles (1887). Deanery of Bicester. Vol. Part III: History of Cottisford, Hardwick and Tusmore. Bristol: JW Arrowsmith.
- Horn, Joyce M (1986). Volume 6, Salisbury Diocese. Fasti Ecclesiæ Anglicanæ 1541–1857. pp. 93–105.
- Lobel, Mary D, ed. (1959). A History of the County of Oxford. Victoria County History. Vol. 6: Ploughley Hundred. London: Oxford University Press for the Institute of Historical Research. pp. 103–116.
- Milnes-Walker, H (1978). "A Saxon Church at Cottisford?". Oxoniensia. XLIII. Oxfordshire Architectural and Historical Society: 255–256.
- Sherwood, Jennifer; Pevsner, Nikolaus (1974). Oxfordshire. The Buildings of England. Harmondsworth: Penguin Books. pp. 558–559. ISBN 0-14-071045-0.
