= Betty Timms =

English writer and sister of Flora Thompson

Ethel Elizabeth Timms, known as Betty Timms (10 June 1886 – 3 February 1980) was an English writer. Her success with a children's story, The Little Grey Men of the Moor (1926), is said to have encouraged her older sister, Flora Thompson, author of Lark Rise to Candleford, to persevere in writing.

== Life ==
Betty Timms was born in Juniper Hill in rural Oxfordshire, the daughter of Albert Timms, a stonemason, and Emma Timms, a nursemaid. When she was four the family moved to Cottisford.

Timms wrote a children's story, The Little Grey Men of the Moor (1926), which book was published by George G. Harrap and Co. as part of their popular Little Story Books series, and illustrated by Nora Fry. Around the time that Flora Thompson wrote Lark Rise to Candleford, Timms wrote her own childhood memoirs, though they were not published in her lifetime. In 2012 her typewritten manuscript was published as More Tales from Lark Rise.

In 1928 she married Henry Eastwood, only to lose him two years later, when he died at the age of 63 years.

Ethel Elizabeth "Betty" Eastwood née Timms died in Wincanton, Somerset, England, 3 February 1980.

== Works ==
- The Little Grey Men of the Moor. London: George G. Harrap & Co, 1926. Illustrated by Nora Fry.
- More Tales from Lark Rise: The Childhood Memories of Flora Thompson's Younger Sister. Charlbury: Wychwood Press, 2012.
