= Katharine Morris (writer) =

Katharine 'Mollie' Morris
- Born: 22 May 1910; Nottingham
- Died: 22 August 1999 (aged 89)
- Occupations: Writer and Social Worker

Katharine 'Mollie' Morris (22 May 1910 - 22 August 1999) was a Nottingham born writer, known for her five published 'gentle tales of rural England', for which she took inspiration from Nottinghamshire and the area surrounding Bleasby.

== Early life ==
Morris was born in Nottingham on 22 May 1910. She was the daughter of lace manufacturer Robert Ernest Morris and Katharine, née Dymoke. Morris spent her early childhood at Albert Grove, Lenton until the family moved to Little Firs in Bleasby, Nottinghamshire. Morris had her first story published as 'Mollie' Morris in Tiger Tim's Weekly when she was nine years old.

== Work ==
In 1931 Morris met Lionel Britton at a Bloomsbury Café. He took away a copy of her unpublished manuscript to read, and subsequently advised her to write about the village she knew and to give each character their own voice. In 1933 her first novel New Harrowing was published by Methuen, and dedicated to Britton in recognition of his help.

During the Second World War, Morris served in the police section of the Women's Auxiliary Air Force, and later in a welfare role. Her brother, Robert Varley Morris, also served in the war but was killed in action in Italy in November 1945. His name appears on the War Memorial in St Mary's Churchyard, Bleasby. After the war Morris spent a year volunteering in a welfare role in Hamburg before spending the remainder of her working life as a social worker in Kensington and Chelsea.

During the 1930s, Morris became involved in PEN International, the human rights organisation originally for ‘Poets, Essayists and Novelists', and by the 1950s she was at her most productive with her writing. Her second novel The Vixen's Cub was published by Macdonald of London in 1951. Country Dance was published in 1955. The 'promising' writer was praised for preserving an authentic country atmosphere and life in rural England, described 'as refreshing as a country ramble'. Further novels followed with The House by the Water (1957) and The Long Meadow (1958).

Morris retired to Bleasby in 1975 where she painted, sculpted and wrote. One of her sculptures Coriolanus before the People was awarded first prize in the Quatercentenary Shakespeare Festival at Southwark Festival in 1964. This is now held by Nottingham City Museums and Galleries.

Morris died on 22 August 1999 and was buried with her parents in Bleasby Churchyard. A typescript copy of a memoir and diary written by Morris is held at Duke University Libraries. This gives an account of her early life and writing career as well as her friendships with other writers such as Lionel Britton, Janko Lavrin and Nora Lavrin. A small collection of Morris's unpublished writings, including a novel, a short story, a collection of poems, and reminiscences, are held by Manuscripts and Special Collections, the University of Nottingham (MS 585). A photograph of Katharine Morris is held at the National Portrait Gallery in London.
