= Lady Isabel and the Elf Knight =

Traditional song

- Folk song
- Catalogue: Roud 21, Child 4
- Published: 1750 – 1799: Europe
- Publisher: Broadside

"Lady Isabel and the Elf Knight" (Child #4; Roud #21) is the English common name representative of a very large class of European ballads.

The most frequently collected variant, The Outlandish Knight or May Colvin tells the tale of a young woman who elopes with a knight who has promised to marry her (and who in some instances uses magic to charm her) but who then tries to murder her to get money, clothes and horses. By a quick-witted ruse she manages to kill him instead, and in many versions she is helped to keep this experience from her parents by a resourceful parrot. The main variant has been collected frequently from traditional singers in England, Scotland, Ireland and North America.

== Synopses ==
Three main English language variants of this group of ballads, with rather different plots, have been published:

=== The Gowans Sae Gae ===
Lady Isabel hears the horn of an elf-knight and wishes she had the horn and the knight "to sleep in my bosom". He immediately appears and asks her to go to the greenwood. They ride there, and he tells her that he has killed seven kings' daughters there and she is to be the eighth. She suggests that he put his head on her knee "that we may hae some rest before that I die". She puts him to sleep with a "small charm" and after tying him up with his own belt she kills him with his own dagger.

This version is written in couplets, with a refrain as second and fourth line:

Fair lady Isabel sits in her bower sewing,
Aye as the gowans grow gay
There she heard an elf-knight blawing his horn.
The first morning in May

"Gowan" is a name used for a number of plants with yellow flowers, but unless modified by another word, it usually means the common daisy, Bellis perennis, also called the "may gowan".

May Day, the morning of May 1, and May Eve, the evening of April 30, were important holidays with pagan connotations.

This variant is Child's A.

=== The Water o Wearie's Well ===
A king's daughter is full of woe. A harpist plays and everyone else falls asleep. He takes her on the back of his horse to Wearie's Well. He tells her to wade in, and when she expresses her doubts - when she is up to her knee and then her waist - says that no harm will befall her and that he has often watered his horse there. When she is up to her chin he tells her:

Seven king's-daughters I've drownd there,
In the water o Wearie's Well,
And I'll make you the eight o them,
And ring the common bell

She asks him for a kiss to "comfort me" and when he leans down to kiss her she pulls him from the saddle and drowns him. She swims to the shore and thanks God that "The dangers she o'ercame".

This version was Child's B.

=== The Outlandish Knight ===
The Roud Folk Song Index lists about 60 names for this group of songs, most of which refer to this variant, including Fause (or False) Sir John, May Colvin (or variants), Go Bring Me Some of Your Mother's Gold, and Pretty Polly. This variant includes Child's C to F, and the vast majority of versions listed by Roud, including many named Lady Isabel and the Elf-knight or variants thereon.

A knight offers to take a young woman to his home in the north and marry her, and suggests she takes "some of your father's gold and some of your mother's fee"(Child F), as well as two horses (often white for her, dapple-grey for him) from her father's stables (where there are almost always "thirty and three"). They ride, sometimes to the side of a river, or more often to the banks of the sea, where he tells her to dismount:

'Mount off, mount off, thy lily-white steed,
And deliver it unto me
For six pretty maidens I have drowned here
And the seventh thou shalt be.'

He tells her to take off her clothing, sometimes item by item (Child E), as it is too costly to be allowed to rot in the sea. She asks him either to turn his back:

For it is not fitting that such a ruffian
A naked woman should see. (Child E)

or to cut down the local vegetation:

'Go fetch the sickle to cut the nettle
That grows so near the brim,
For fear it should tangle my golden locks
Or freckle my lily white skin' (Child F)

and then either she pushes him into the sea or "seizes him by the middle so sma" and throws him in.

He asks her to help him out, but she refuses:

'Lie there, lie there, you false-hearted man,
Lie there instead of me,
For if six pretty maidens thou hast drowned here,
The seventh has drowned thee.'

She rides home, leading the spare horse. Sometimes the story ends here, but often when she arrives home a parrot comments on how late she has returned, saying he is afraid "Some ruffian hath led you astray". She promises him a luxurious cage if he keeps her secret, and when her father asks the parrot what makes him "speak before it is day" he replies that a cat was going to eat him. His mistress promises him that:

"Thy cage shall be made of the glittering gold,
And the door of the best ivory"

In performance the last syllable of the fourth line is sometimes repeated twice, and then the line is repeated:

The seventh has drowned thee. thee, thee, The seventh has drowned thee.

In Scotland this variant is sometimes called May Colvin (various alternative spellings occur). Child gives two versions of this. Child's D version is very similar to other texts except that the young woman is named as May Colven and the knight as False Sir John. In the second the knight uses a charm to make an initially reluctant May Collin go with him, and the story ends when, after the parrot episode, she goes to her parents, tells them what has happened, and they go to the scene of the crime to find and bury the body "for fear it should be seen".

== Publication history ==
The earliest known version of any of these variants is either a broadside entitled The False Knight Outwitted sometime in the second half of the eighteenth century (also the earliest "Outlandish Knight" text and Child's version F), or May Colvin, published in Herd's "Ancient and Modern Scottish Songs" in 1776 (Child's version C). The earliest printed version of "The Gowans sae Gae" was in "Ancient Ballads and Songs Volume 1" by Peter Buchan while "The Water o Wearie's Well" was first published in Volume 2 of the same book. Both volumes were published in 1828.

The Outlandish Knight variant was repeatedly printed by broadside publishers both in London and the provinces. Most broadside texts are fairly similar to one another, and often start:

An outlandish knight came from the north lands
And He came a'wooing of me
He told me he'd take me to the north lands
And there he would marry me.

The song seems to have been in circulation earlier than the printed version. In her semi-autobiographical novel Lark Rise, Flora Thompson born in 1876 and growing up in Juniper Hill, Oxfordshire, stated that in the early 1880s she heard an 83-year-old man sing the Outlandish Knight. He would have been born about 1800 and said he had learned it from his grandfather (who was probably born about 1740), who in turn learned it from his own grandfather (who was probably born about 1680).

=== Versions in 18th and 19th century ballad collections ===
- May Colvin was published in "Ancient and modern Scottish songs, heroic ballads, etc.; Vol. 1" (1776) by David Herd.
- May Colvin was published in "The Scottish Minstrel", (1821), by Robert Archibald Smith.
- May Collin was published in "A Ballad Book" (First published in 1823 for private distribution, re-published in 1880) by Charles Kirkpatrick Sharpe.
- May Collean was published in "The Scottish Ballads" (1828) by Robert Chambers.
- The Gowans sae Gae and The Water o'Wearies Well were published in "Ancient Ballads and Songs of the North of Scotland" (1828) by Peter Buchan.
- The Outlandish Knight was published in "Ancient poems, ballads, and songs" (1846) by James Henry Dixon.
- May Colvin was published in "Minstrelsy, Ancient and Modern" (1846) by William Motherwell.
- May Colvin was published in "The Ballads and songs of Ayrshire" (1847) by James Paterson.
- Two texts of May Colvin were published in "The Book of Scottish Ballads" (1857) by Alexander Whitelaw. These are Herd's and Motherwell's versions.
- The Water o Wearie's Well was included in "Early ballads illustrative of history, traditions and customs" by Robert Bell, published in 1861.
- The Outlandish Knight was published in "Northumbrian minstrelsy : a collection of the ballads, melodies and small pipe-tunes of Northumbria", (1881) by J Collingwood Bruce and John Stokoe.
- Child published The Gowans Sae Gae (one text), The Water o'Wearies Well (one text), May Collen/Collin (two texts), and two texts of the Outlandish Knight type in "The English and Scottish Popular Ballads Part 1" (1882).
- The Outlandish Knight was published in "Shropshire Folk-Lore" (1883) by Charlotte S Burne.
- The Outlandish Knight was published in "Traditional Tunes" (1891) by Frank Kidson.
- May Collean was published in "The Ballads and Songs of Carrick" (c.1892) by Rev. Roderick Lawson.
- The Outlandish Knight was published in "Songs & Ballads of Northern England" (1899) by Stokoe & Reay.

=== Other song books ===
- Arthur Quiller-Couch, (ed.) The Oxford Book of Ballads, 1910.
- Carl Sandburg; "American Songbag", Pretty Polly; 1927.
- Cecil Sharp, English Folk Songs from the Southern Appalachians, Oxford University Press, London, 1952. vol. 1, p. 7.
- R. Vaughan Williams & A. L. Lloyd, The Penguin Book of English Folk Songs, Penguin Books, 1959, pp. 80–81 (as "The Outlandish Knight")
- The Outlandish Knight, "Songs of the Midlands", Roy Palmer, 1972.
- Geoffrey Grigson (ed.), The Penguin Book of Ballads, Penguin Books, 1975. ISBN 0-14-042193-9. pp. 40–41
- Steve Roud and Julia Bishop, (eds), "The New Penguin Book of English Folk Songs", 2012, ISBN 978-0-141-19461-5. pp 311–313, 490-491. (as "The Outlandish Knight")

=== Collection history ===
The Roud Folk Song Index lists about 367 instances of this group of ballads collected from traditional singers, with the great majority being of the Outlandish Knight story. 198 were collected in the USA, 120 in England, 31 in Canada, 9 in Ireland, 8 in Scotland, and 1 in Australia. This is probably an underestimate as it is based on named performers, and collectors haven't always named the sources of the songs they publish.

Steve Roud and Julia Bishop point out that this is one of about half a dozen Child ballads that have been most consistently popular, having been collected "time and again all over the English-speaking world"

=== Field recordings ===
Many of these are available to listen online.

Informant	Location	Collector	Year	Title	Recording held by:
Joseph Leaning	Lincolnshire	Percy Grainger	1908	The Outlandish Knight	British Library
Jumbo Brightwell	Suffolk	E. J. Moeran	1951	The False-Hearted Knight	Association for Cultural Equity
Luke Stanley	Lincolnshire	Alan Lomax	1954	The Outlandish Knight	Association for Cultural Equity
William "Bill" Williams	Gloucestershire	Peter Kennedy	1957	The False Hearted Knight	British Library Sound Archive.
Otis Bird	Arkansas	Max Hunter	1958	Little Billy	Max Hunter Collection, Missouri State University.
Mrs. Allie Long Parker	Arkansas	Max Hunter	1958	Loving Polly	Max Hunter Collection, Missouri State University.
Mr. Fred High	Arkansas	Max Hunter	1959	Willie Came Over the Main Wide Ocean	Max Hunter Collection, Missouri State University.
Donia Cooper	Arkansas	Max Hunter	1959	Pretty Polly	Max Hunter Collection, Missouri State University.
Ollie Gilbert	Arkansas	Max Hunter	1959	Pretty Polly	Max Hunter Collection, Missouri State University.
Fred Jordan	Shropshire	Steve Gardham	1971	The Outlandish Knight	Steve Gardham Collection, British Library Sound Archive.
Willie Mathieson	Kinross, Scotland	Ailie Edmunds Munro	1973	May Colvin	Tobar an Dualchais/Kist o'Riches website.
Fred Jordan	Shropshire	Bob Patten	1992	The Outlandish Knight	Bob and Jacqueline Patten Collection, British Library Sound Archive

== Discussion ==
=== Relationships and origins ===
These ballads have received a lot of attention from folklorists and other scholars. There is some consensus that they derive from a family of ballads related to the Dutch ballads about Heer Halewijn. Discussion is sometimes confusing as both an individual variant and the group as a whole can be referred to as a ballad by scholars.

The ballad family is known throughout Europe and is described by Child as the ballad which "has perhaps obtained the widest circulation". He notes that the Scandinavian and German versions (both Low and High German) are the fullest versions, while the southern European ones are rather shorter, and the English versions somewhat brief.

The Dutch song Heer Halewijn is one of the earlier (13th century) versions of this tale, fuller and preserving older elements, including such things as the murderer's head speaking after the heroine has beheaded him, attempting to get her to do tasks for him.

At least 60 French, or French-Canadian versions have been collected and these almost all end in the same location as the English version, on a riverbank or by the sea, a motif only found elsewhere in the extensive and widespread Polish variants.

Numerous German variants are known. Child says 26 German variants but Lloyd, writing more than a century later, claims over 250. In some, the heroine rescues herself; in others her brother rescues her; and in still others, the murderer succeeds but her brother kills him after the fact. In some of them, the dead women reappear as doves and attempt to warn the latest victim.

At least eleven Danish variants are known, often including the heroine's meeting with the sister or the men of the murderer and dealing with them as well. An Icelandic version has a very short account of the tale. Other variants are northern Italian, Spanish, Portuguese, and Magyar.

In his introduction to this group of ballads Child discusses their place in European culture. He places them in the group of ballads and stories often named after what is considered to be the most complete example, the Dutch ballad Heer Halewijn, he describes ballads from Denmark, Norway, Sweden, Germany, Transylvania, Italy, Spain, Portugal and France and he reviews theories put forward to explain the origin of this ballad family and the nature of the "Outlandish Knight". He mentions theories that the ballad draws on stories about elves, or about the nix or neck, malevolent water spirits in German folklore, and that it is derived from the Judith and Holofernes story in the Old Testament.

Holger Olof Nygard, in an article in "The Journal of American Folklore" discusses the various theories put forward about the origin of the ballads in this group and what he calls its "continental analogues". These include:

- Svend Grundtvig's suggestion that the ballads are derived from some "obscured elf song" and that it derived from a Scandinavian source. Nygard points out that elves are not considered predatory in Scandinavian folklore and that the only ballad in which the male protagonist is referred to as an elf is Child's A version.
- Franz Böhme's theory that the knight was originally a nix, or neck, a water spirit found in the folklore of Germanic people - Child seems to have accepted this idea at first but dropped it after Grundtvig and others asked how such a creature could be killed by drowning.
- The notion of Goethe and others that the story may have derived from the French Bluebeard tales. Nygard says the tale and ballads have been separate and distinct as far as records go back, and that this is a case of "polygenesis of a narrative idea".
- Nygard dismisses Franz Holz's suggestion that the tale originates in the mediaeval idea that maiden's blood could cure leprosy because apart from an odd Swiss ballad no version gives any indication what the knight does with the maidens (apart from killing them) or suggests he is in ill-health.
- Leon Pineau suggested that the knight represented "the spirits of shadows, death, night and winter, finally overcome by the warmth of summer" and the murdered maids representing months of the year. Nygard sees this as an example of "the tendency to write the ballad group's early history not on its own terms but on terms dictated by something else".
- Paul de Keyser's psychoanalytic theory, based on Dutch versions in which the hero is beheaded, makes the ballad group about "punishment by castration arising from the suppressed desires of the singer". But the girl's brother only has a role in a few versions of the ballad.
- Last but not least, Nygard discusses the idea put forward by Sophus Bugge that the story itself descends from the biblical tale of Judith and Holofernes. But, among other objections, Nygard points out that Holofernes did not intend to kill Judith - he wanted sex with her - and had not murdered a succession of other maidens either, yet those murders seem to be at the heart of the ballad. He points out too that Bugge cherry-picks details occurring only in widely scattered variants that happen to fit with his biblical theory.

Two sentences in Nygard's conclusion are worth quoting:

"We are left with a handful of improbable impossibilities as to the source of the ballad. And for these we may well be thankful, for their authors have trod the sands of surmise and have taught us how to avoid them, if we will but learn by example.

=== Age ===
Child takes it for granted that the Scottish and English ballads he publishes are old, and that they are the remnants of more elaborate originals:

"although the best English forms are not without ancient and distinctive marks, most of these have been eliminated, and the better ballads are very brief"

In this he follows Charles Kirkpatrick Sharpe who writes of the version of May Collin in his "Ballad Book" (Child's version D):

"This ballad appears modern from a great many expressions, yet I am certain that it is old".

But Steve Roud points out that as the two earliest British versions are late 18th century and

"Despite its archaic feel and close foreign relatives, the ballad does not seem to be very old, at least in Britain"

=== Locality ===
There have been various other rationalisations, attaching the story to specific locations and historical events: for example to Gilles de Laval in the early fifteenth century. The variant May Collean has been attached, as a legend, to the coast of Ayrshire, where the heroine was said to come from the family Kennedy of Colzean. A rocky promontory called Gamesloup, on the Ayrshire coast, is pointed to by local people as the spot where the knight drowned his victims. This local association is noted by A. L. Lloyd who quotes it as an example of a ballad which "so strikes the common imagination that people want to make the piece their own by giving it a local setting".

=== Authenticity of The Gowans sae Gae ===
There have been doubts raised about the authenticity of Child's A version, The Gowans sae Gae, the suggestion being that it was composed by Peter Buchan (editor of "Ancient Ballads and Songs of the North of Scotland" (1828), the source of Child's A and B versions) or one of his informants,. This is referred to by D K Wilgus:

In addition to the now-discredited notion that the "Lady Isabel" form is the Scottish original of the non-supernatural English texts, two explanations of the "Elf-Knight" text are possible. One, based on the comparative evidence, is that the "Lady Isabel" text is a palpable fraud perpetuated by Peter Buchan with the probable help of a "supplier". This is the option chosen by Nygard. The other possibility, argued by David Buchan, is that "Lady Isabel" is a "stray" from Scandinavia which turned up in Aberdeenshire. In terms of the Anglo-American tradition of the "Outlandish Knight" the "Lady Isabel" text is of little importance, since it seems to have had no influence except in the scholarly titling of variants.

Wilgus goes on to say:

Nygard depended to some extent on extratextual information in being influenced by the suspicion of texts from Peter Buchan's collection, voiced by Child and other scholars. Ironically, Child's suspicions were largely based on the subliterary character of other texts, while "Lady Isabel" is literarily superior.

Neither of Buchan's variants is found at all widely in the tradition, if they are found at all. Versions titled Isabelle and the Elf-Knight are mainly versions of the "Outlandish Knight" variant.

== Cultural relationships ==
=== Standard references ===
- Roud 21
- Child 4

=== Textual variants ===
Several variations of the ballad were classified by Francis James Child that feature a "Lord" instead of an elf knight.

Some variations have a parrot at the end, who promises not to tell what happened. In some of these, the parrot is eaten by the cat.

The variations of the ballad vary on some of the key characters and details:

Lady Isabel variants per Child	Heroine	Villain	# Dead Women	Setting	Parrot	Notes & Source(s)
The Gowans sae gay or Aye as the Gowans grow gay	Lady Isabel	Elf-Knight	7	Greenwood		Buchan's Ballads I:22 of N. Scotland; Motherwell's MS p. 563
The Water o Wearie's Well	King's daughter	Luppen	7	Wearie's Well		Buchan's Ballads of the N. of Scotland II:80; Motherwell's MS, Harris MS 19
May Colvin or May Colvin, or False Sir John	May Colvin	False Sir John	7	Sea-side	Yes	year 1776. Herd's MSS I:166; Herd's Ancient & Modern Scottish Songs 1776:193, Motherwell's Minstrelsy p67
May Collin, May Collean or Fause Sir John and May Colvin	May Collin	Sir John, bloody knight	8	Bunion Bay	Yes	year 1823. Sharpe's Ballad Book 1823, 17:45; Buchan's Ballads of N. Scotland II:45
The Outlandish Knight	Lady	Outlandish knight	6	Sea-side	Yes	Note: This version is "a modernized version" - from "Ancient Poems, Ballads and Songs of the Peasantry of England" by Dixon:74. The story is performed by UK folk group Bellowhead on their album Burlesque.
The False Knight Outwitted	Lady	Knight	6	River-side	Yes	Roxburghe Ballads, III:449
Comparable song
"Heer Halewijn" (Dutch)	Princess	Halewijn	many	Forest & gallowfield		13th century. (compared to Outlandish Knight and May Colvin or False Sir John)
"The Lonely Willow Tree" (American)	Sally Brown	Cruel youth	6	Willow tree by seaside		Colonial & Revolution Songbook, McNeil & McNeil, 1996; claimed C17th origin but no source provided

Other titles:

- An Outlandish Rover
- The Highway Robber
- The Old Beau
- The False-Hearted Knight
- If I Take Off My Silken Stays

The Roud Folk Song Index lists 68 different titles. "The Outlandish Knight" is the most frequent.

=== Songs that refer to Lady Isabel and the Elf Knight ===
The dialogue between the Lady and the parrot, which appears in some versions, was made into a comic song: "Tell Tale Polly", published in Charley Fox's Minstrel Companion (ca. 1860).

=== Motifs ===
Another related ballad, "Hind Etin" (Child Ballad #41), also begins with abduction and rape by an elf, but ends with the pair falling in love and living happily together.

Many of the same motifs are found in Child Ballad 48, "Young Andrew".

=== Literature ===
Various forms of these ballads show great similarity to the fairy tales Fitcher's Bird and Bluebeard.

=== Art ===
Arthur Rackham's "May Colvin and the Parrot" illustrates this ballad.

Kentucky artist and ballad singer Daniel Dutton has a painting of this ballad, titled "False Sir John", on his Ballads of the Barefoot Mind website.

== Music ==
Variants of the song are commonly sung to several different tunes. The following tune was collected by Ralph Vaughan Williams in 1908 from Mr Hilton in South Walsham, Norfolk. It was published in the Folk Song Journal of English Folk Dance and Song Society (IV 123), and included in The Penguin Book of English Folk Songs.

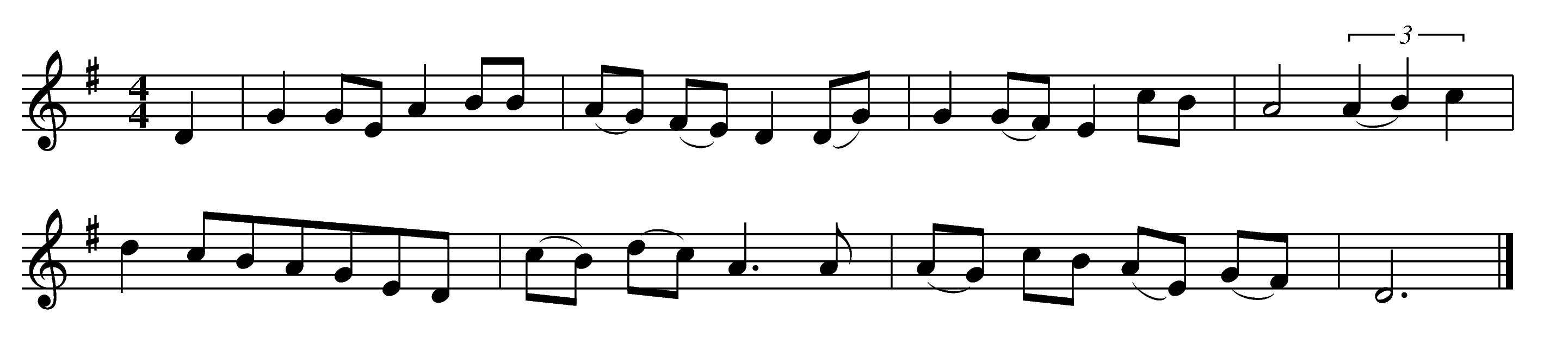

=== Recordings ===
Album/Single	Performer	Year	Variant	Notes
The Legendary J. E. Mainer Vol. 12	J. E. Mainer	c.a. 1950	Six King's Daughters	The lead here is sung by banjoist Morris Herbert
The Outlandish Knight	Cyril Tawney	1969	The Outlandish Knight	
Love, Death and The Lady	Shirley and Dolly Collins	1970	The Outlandish Knight	
Ballads and Songs	Nic Jones	1970	The Outlandish Knight	Version from Cecil Sharp's English Folk Songs
Nic Jones	Nic Jones	1971	The Outlandish Knight	Different version from previous
Shearwater	Martin Carthy	1972	The Outlandish Knight	
Time	Steeleye Span	1996	The Elf Knight	The tune used here is by Bob Johnson
The True Lover's Farewell: Appalachian Folk Ballads	Custer LaRue	1998	The Outlandish Knight	
Play On Light	Sileas	1999	May Colvin	
Think Before You Think	Danú	2000	The Outlandish Knight	
Lady Isabel and the Elf-Knight	Lisa Theriot	2001	Lady Isabel and the Elf Knight	
Sae Will We Yet	Tony Cuffe	2003	The Water o Wearie's Well	Tune by Cuffe
The Ballad Tree	Alison McMorland and Geordie McIntyre	2003	May Colvin	
Bellow	Spiers and Boden	2003	The Outlandish Knight	
The Curate's Egg	Poor Old Horse	2004	Lady Isabel and the Elf Knight	
Burlesque	Bellowhead	2006	The Outlandish Knight	
Too Long Away	Emily Smith	2008	May Colvin	
Mountain Hearth & Home	Jean Ritchie	2010	False Sir John	
Reformation House	Galley Beggar	2010	The Outlandish Knight	Shortened version with two verses
The Voice of the People: Good People, Take Warning	Fred Jordan	2012	Six Pretty Maids	1952 recording previously issued on LP
The Same Way Down	Annalivia	2012	False Sir John	An upbeat, musically creative version of this ballad
Battleplan	Bella Hardy	2013	The Seventh Girl	
Sing a Full Song	Miranda Sykes & Rex Preston	2013	Lady Isabel and the Elf Knight	
Ghost	Kate Rusby	2014	The Outlandish Knight	
The Songs Of Angela Carter	Polly Paulusma	2021	Lady Isabel & The Elf-Knight	
The Highway at Night/"May Colvin"	Castle Black	2024	False Sir Joh	Rock version

== See also ==
- List of the Child Ballads
