= Lynton Lamb =

English artist and illustrator (1907–1977)

RDI, FSRA, FSIA Lynton Lamb
- Born: 15 April 1907; British India
- Died: 4 September 1977 (aged 70); Sandon, Essex, England
- Known for: Lithography; illustration

Lynton ("Larry") Lamb RDI, FSRA, FSIA (15 April 1907 – 4 September 1977) was an English artist-designer, author, lithographer and illustrator who was notable for his book jacket, poster, architectural decoration and postage stamp designs.

== Life and work ==
Lamb was born the son of The Reverend Frederick Lamb in Nizamabad, Telangana, India. He grew up in London, and was educated at Kingswood School, Bath, Somerset. He then worked in an Estate Agents office and attended night school at Camberwell School of Art before studying art full-time at the Central School of Arts and Crafts.

From 1930 he designed book jackets and bindings for the Oxford University Press and other publishers, with a break for military service during World War II when he designed camouflage. One title was Elizabeth Goudge's The Middle Window (Gerald Duckworth, 1935). In 1936 he had an exhibition of paintings at the Storran Gallery.

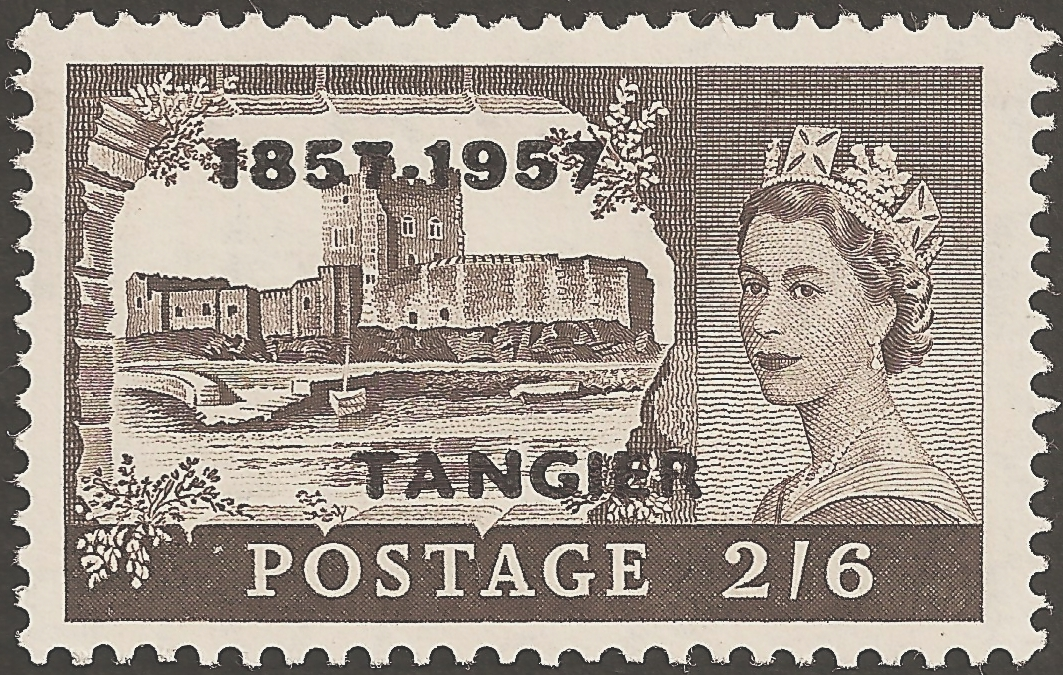
Postage stamp designed by Lynton Lamb

Lamb provided the illustrations for the first editions of A German Idyll (1932) by H. E. Bates, and Flora Thompson's novel Lark Rise (1939) – the first part of what would become her Lark Rise to Candleford trilogy.

He designed decorations for Orient Lines ships from 1935 to 1950, exhibited works at the Festival of Britain in 1951 and designed the binding of the Bible used at the Coronation of Queen Elizabeth II. In 1953–54 he designed the Queen Elizabeth II Castle series high-value definitive stamps issue featuring views of four castles in England, Scotland, Wales and Northern Ireland framed by an old stone wall later nicknamed the 'broken grotto'. He received the International Philatelic Art Society Award for the designs in 1960. In 2005, to commemorate the 50th anniversary of the stamps' issue, the Post Office re-issued the designs with new values. The Royal Mint featured the same designs on a set of silver ingots issued in 2006.

Lamb was the Author of the Inspector Charles Glover Detective stories, Death of a Dissenter, Worse Than Death, Picture Frame and Man in a Mist, published by Victor Gollancz, London, between 1969 and 1974.

His art publications included The Purpose of Painting (1936) and Preparation for Painting (1954). He was head of lithography at the Royal College of Art and Slade School of Fine Art and was named 'Royal Designer to Industry' in 1974.

Lamb lived in retirement in Sandon, Essex and died aged 70.
