= Lavrin =

Lavrin is a surname. Notable people with the surname include:

- Asunción Lavrin (born 1935), Cuba historian and author
- Janko Lavrin (1887–1986), Slovene novelist, poet, critic, translator, and historian
- Nora Fry Lavrin (1897–1985), English engraver, book illustrator and painter
