= Tusmore =

Tusmore may refer to:

- Tusmore, South Australia
- Tusmore, Oxfordshire
