= Tusmore Park =

Tusmore Park can mean

- Tusmore Park, a country estate in Oxfordshire, England
- Tusmore Park, a public park in Adelaide, South Australia
