= Keith Dewhurst =

English playwright and scriptwriter (1931–2025)

Keith Dewhurst (24 December 1931 – 11 January 2025) was an English playwright and film and television scriptwriter.

== Life and career ==
Born in Oldham on 24 December 1931, Dewhurst was educated at Rydal School and Peterhouse, Cambridge, graduating with a B.A. in English in 1953. After working as a yarn tester for Lancashire Cotton Corporation, he worked for the Manchester Evening Chronicle from 1955 to 1959, as their reporter on Manchester United.

Dewhurst wrote television plays from 1960, and plays for the theatre from the late 1960s. He also wrote radio plays and a couple of novels. His non-fiction Underdogs (2012) tells the story of Darwen FC's long run in the 1879 F.A. Cup. His dramatic adaptation of Robert Louis Stevenson's Kidnapped was staged by the Royal Lyceum Theatre Company, Edinburgh, under the direction of Bill Bryden in August 1972.

Dewhurst died on 11 January 2025, at the age of 93.

== Works ==
=== Plays ===
- Running Milligan. Televised 1965. Published in Michael Marland, ed., Z Cars: Four Scripts from the Television Series, 1968.
- Rafferty's Chant. Produced at the Mermaid Theatre, 1967. Published in Plays of the Year33, 1967.
- Corunna!. Produced 1971.
- Kidnapped, adaptation of the novel by Robert Louis Stevenson. Produced 1972.
- The Bomb in Brewery Street. Produced 1975.
- Lark Rise and Candleford, adaptation of works by Flora Thompson. Produced 1978–1979.
- Don Quixote, adaptation of the novel by Miguel de Cervantes. Produced 1982.
- The Animals of Farthing Wood, adaptation of the Colin Dann novel.

=== Television plays ===
- Albert Hope, 1962
- The Siege of Manchester, 1965
- Men of Iron, 1969
- It Calls for a Great Deal of Love, 1969
- Lloyd-George, 1973
- Our Terry, 1975
- Two Girls and a Millionaire, 1978

=== Non-fiction ===
- Underdogs: the unlikely story of football's first FA Cup heroes (Yellow Press, 2012)
- When You Put on a Red Shirt: Memories of Matt Busby, Jimmy Murphy and Manchester United (Yellow Press, 2012)
