= A Pleasant Ballad of Tobias =

English ballad

Song
- Genre: Broadside ballad

A Pleasant Ballad of Tobias is an English broadside ballad from the late 17th century. It is based on the story of Tobias from The Book of Tobit, one of the Apocrypha from the Dead Sea Scrolls. It tells the story of a young man, Tobias, who travels to Media to reclaim a debt from his father's friend, Gabael. He is accompanied by a guiding angel, Azarius. In the Book of Tobit, it is revealed that Azarius is actually the archangel Raphael. Azarius sets up a match between Tobias and Gabael's daughter, Sarah. Sarah has already had seven husbands, all of whom were killed by an evil spirit who is in love with her and won't allow any man to become her husband. Azarius uses the holy spirit to destroy the evil spirit's curse, and Sarah and Tobias are happily married. It is sung to a "pleasant new tune." Copies of the ballad can be found at the University of Glasgow library and the National Library of Scotland.

== Synopsis ==
In the first stanza, we are introduced to Tobit, an old blind man who only had one son with his wife named Anna. Tobit tells his son, Tobias, that he must go to Raguel's house in Media to recover ten talents that Tobit lent to Gabael many years ago. Tobias does not know the way, as he has never been to Media, so Azarius is called upon to guide him.

In the second stanza, they reach the Tigris river, where Tobias washes. He is scared by a giant fish that jumps out of the water. Azarius tells him to cut up the fish and to keep the liver, heart, and gall bladder, which will later be used as a cure. He then tells Tobias that Gabael has a daughter (Sarah) and that he will try to convince Gabael to allow Tobias and Sarah to marry. Tobias says he doesn't want to marry Sarah, as she has already had seven husbands, and all of them have been killed by an evil spirit. Azarius assures him that he will make a perfume that will dispel the spirit.

In the third stanza, the match between Tobias and Sarah is made and they are married. When Tobias goes up to the bridal chamber, Sarah is crying because she thinks he will be killed. Tobias burns the fish parts over a bed of coals and the spirit is forced out of the room. They lie in bed together, free of the evil spirit. Gabriel also thinks that Tobias will die in the night, and even digs a grave for him. When he sends his maid up to check on them, however, it turns out that everyone is fine. They celebrate with a feast and a fourteen-day bridal.

In the fourth stanza, we learn that Tobias' parents are grieving because they also believe that Tobias is dead. Anna is so distraught that she can't eat anything. After the fourteen-day bridal, Tobias and Sarah return home to Nineveh and greet his parents, who rejoice. Tobias rubs his father's eyes with the gall bladder of the fish and restores his eyesight.

=== Form ===
The ballad is written in four long stanzas (36 lines) of iambic tetrameter in an ABAB rhyme scheme.

== Cultural and historical significance ==
Tessa Watt uses A Pleasant Ballad of Tobias to show how "pagan" themes, including magic, remained popular for early modern audiences. She explains that the ballad summarizes only the narrative chapters of the Book of Tobit, highlighting the magic and downplaying the older Toby's relationship with God. According to Watt, the ballad continues the apocryphal tendency to meld superstition with Christian values. She also compares the story to Lady Isabel and the Elf Knight, linking the "Biblical" ballad to the magical "pagan" ballad. The ballad is also used in Peter Marshall and Alexandra Walsham's edited collection of essays aimed to understand how "the nature, existence, and activities of angels negotiated the religious, intellectual and cultural upheavals of the sixteenth and seventeenth centuries."
