= On the Russian Persecution of the Jews =

1882 sonnet by Algernon Charles Swinburne

Poem as reprinted in Tristram of Lyonesse and Other Poems (1882)

"On the Russian Persecution of the Jews" is a 1882 sonnet by English poet Algernon Charles Swinburne, written in response to contemporary reports of antisemitic violence and persecution of Jews in the Russian Empire. It is one of several poems in which Swinburne sharply criticized the policies of the Russian state.

Through biblical imagery and rhetorical questioning, it condemns both religious hypocrisy and antisemitism.

== History ==
The poem was inspired by Algernon Charles Swinburne's reading of the reports in the English press about the antisemitism and persecution of Jews in the Russian Empire. The poem debuted in The Daily Telegraph of 25 January 1882 and was reprinted later this year in Swinburne's collection Tristram of Lyonesse and Other Poems.

== Structure and content ==
The poem has the structure of a Petrarchan sonnet. It consists of two addresses to Jesus divided by a volta. The speaker first condemns Russian Christians as false followers of Christ before invoking Christ's own Jewish identity and suffering. The poem concludes with a rhetorical question asking whether Christ foresaw the crimes that would be committed against Jews by his professed followers.

== Reception ==
In 1887 "On the Russian Persecution of the Jews" was included by William Sharp in the anthology Sonnets of this Century.

Monica Partridge described the poem in 1963 as "compassionate yet bitter".

== Analysis ==
The sonnet conveys its message through biblical imagery. It has been interpreted as an expression of Swinburne's irreligion, or criticism of religion, using the motif of showing a disagreement between Christ and Christianity.

Francis O'Gorman interpreted it as an example of Swinburne's "general fury against Russia". It was one of several poems in which Swinburne was highly critical of the Russian Empire (ex. his "The White Czar" from 1878, "Launch of the Livadia" and "‘Russia: An Ode" from 1880), some of the latter calling for or endorsing the assassination of the Russian tsar, and being subject to critique in the House of Commons.

The poem has also been interpreted as an expression of Swinburne's "strong beliefs towards helping certain groups of people", or more precisely, philosemitism. The final passage can be interpreted as an indictment of Christian antisemitism and religious hypocrisy.

== See also ==
- History of the Jews in Russia
- May Laws (legal restrictions on Jews enacted in Russia in May 1882)
- Persecution of Jews
- Pogroms in the Russian Empire
