= The Outlandish Knight =

The Outlandish Knight may refer to:

- Lady Isabel and the Elf Knight, a variant of this ballad is titled The Outlandish Knight
- The Outlandish Knight (novel), a 1999 historical novel by Richard Adams
