= Averil Demuth =

English author

Averil Constance Demuth (1906–2000) was an English writer of children's stories, several of which have a fantasy element.

== Life ==
Averil Constance Demuth was born on 5 January 1906 in Devon.

In the 1920s Demuth wrote words for music composed by Norman Demuth. However, her first story was Trudi and Hansel (1938), set in the Austrian Tyrol. The girl Trudi, the boy Hansel, the cow Lotti, the dog Berni, the hen Griselda and the raven Kraak all go up the mountain to see Riese the giant, and then all come down again. Eleanor Farjeon gave the book a positive review: "Nora Lavrin's delicious crayon illustrations are the gay and unsophisticated complement to Averil Demuth's Tyrolean tale ... I like this book very much". A biographical sketch of Demuth appeared in the children's book club magazine Young Wings. The House in the Mountains (1940), illustrated by Grace Huxtable, was set in Kandergurgl, a little Swiss village. Max, Lisel and the other children encounter a witch, a wicked baron, Ruffin the dog, Mr Fooks the fox and Mr Trog the bear in a story with kidnappings, magic, secret passages and a ransom.

In 1941 she was living in Heston, Cornwall. She married Anthony Cockbain in Penzance in 1941, though he died in November 1942, after only one year of marriage.

The Enchanted Islands (1941) was followed by Sea Gypsies (1942), a holiday story of Peter and Petronel on an "enchanted island", where the "little people" were as real as humans. The Manchester Guardian reviewer welcomed the book: "This story is very well done".The House of the Wind(1953) was an adventure story set in Cornwall. One reviewer remarked that the story "spurns the hygienic world of normal holidays and enters into Lyonese and ancient magic without being objectionably fey".

In 1968 Demuth edited a book about the Minack Theatre: six people connected to the theatre described their activities, and Demuth herself gave a historical account of the theatre. She died on 16 May 2000 in Penzance.

== Works ==
- (with Norman Demuth) Two ships: unison song. London: Oxford University Press, 1926. The English choral songs, no. 57. Music by Norman Demuth, words by Averil Demuth.
- (with Norman Demuth) Spindrift: unison song. London : Edward Arnold & Co., 1930. Singing class music, No. 370. Music by Norman Demuth, words by Averil Demuth.
- Trudi and Hansel: a story of the Austrian Tyrol. London: J.M. Dent and Sons, 1938. Illustrated by Nora Lavrin.
- The house in the mountains: a Swiss story. London. Illustrated by Grace Huxtable. (American edition illustrated by Ninon MacKnight.)
- The enchanted islands: a modern fairy tale. London: H. Hamilton, 1941. Illustrated by Grace Huxtable.
- The sea gypsies. London: H. Hamilton, 1942. Illustrated by Grace Huxtable.
- The house of the wind. London: Hamish Hamilton, 1953. Illustrated by Fritz Wegner.
- (ed.) The Minack open-air theatre: a symposium . Newton Abbott: David Charles Ltd., 1968.
