= Candleford Green =

1943 novel by Flora Thompson

- First edition
- Author: Flora Thompson
- Language: English
- Genre: Novel
- Publisher: Oxford University Press
- Publication date: 1943
- Publication place: England
- Media type: Print
- Preceded by: Over to Candleford

Candleford Green is a 1943 semi-autobiographical novel by the English author Flora Thompson. The village of the title is partly modelled on the Oxfordshire village of Fringford.

In 1945 the book was republished as part of the trilogy Lark Rise to Candleford, comprising the novels Lark Rise (1939), Over to Candleford (1941), and Candleford Green (1943).

== Plot ==
The novel follows the life of Laura Timmins after her move at the age of 14 from her childhood hamlet of Lark Rise to the nearby village of Candleford Green where she takes up her first job as an assistant in the post office. The novel largely comprises a series of vignettes of the residents of Candleford Green.

== Critical analysis ==
Laura represents the author Flora Thompson herself, born Flora Timms. In 1891, when the author was fourteen, she went to work as a postal assistant in a nearby village, probably Fringford. The novel includes experiences from several post offices and towns she got to know.

According to Richard Mabey in his 2014 book Dreams of the Good Life, "Candleford Green is a village which, like Laura, is in a state of change, slowly evolving into a kind of suburb, and nurturing a new social class 'on the borderline between the working and middle classes'".

== See also ==
- Lark Rise to Candleford, the trilogy of which this novel is a part.
