= Over to Candleford =

1941 novel by Flora Thompson

- 1944 edition
- Author: Flora Thompson
- Language: English
- Genre: Novel
- Publisher: Oxford University Press
- Publication date: 1941
- Publication place: England
- Media type: Print
- Preceded by: Lark Rise
- Followed by: Candleford Green

Over to Candleford is a 1941 semi-autobiographical novel by the English author Flora Thompson.

In 1945 the book was republished as part of the trilogy Lark Rise to Candleford, comprising the novels Lark Rise (1939), Over to Candleford (1941), and Candleford Green (1943).

== Plot ==
The novel follows the childhood of Laura Timmins in the small rural Oxfordshire hamlet of Lark Rise and the surrounding countryside. It is a study of her family and relatives in the nearby market town of Candleford (based chiefly on Buckingham).

== Critical analysis ==
Laura represents the author Flora Thompson herself, born Flora Timms. According to Richard Mabey in his 2014 book Dreams of the Good Life, in this novel Laura's role is subtly changing from sharp observer of village life to someone reflecting on the rites of passage to adulthood, a novelist in embryo.

== See also ==
- Lark Rise to Candleford, the trilogy of which this novel is a part.
