= Heer Halewijn =

Dutch folk tale

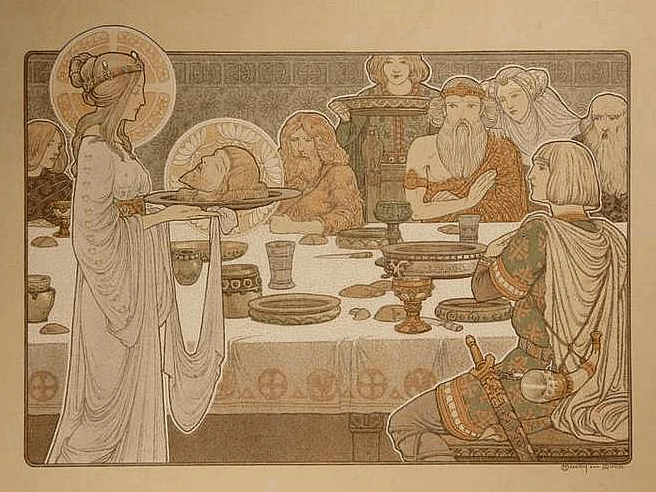
The head of Heer Halewijn is shown all over and the tale ends with a great celebration.

Heer Halewijn (also known as Van Here Halewijn and Jan Albers, and in English The Song of Lord Halewijn) is a Dutch folk tale which survives in a form of folk ballad. Although the first printed version of the song only appears in an anthology published in 1848, the ballad itself is first written down in the 13th century but dates back to pre-Christian times and is one of the oldest Dutch folk songs with ancient subject matter to be recorded. The story of lord Halewijn itself is even older and contains elements going back to Carolingian times. Many of its mythemes range back to Germanic pre-Christian legends.

The song's subject matter is similar in many respects to several Germanic songs circulating in the Middle Ages Europe, notably close to the English ballad May Colvin or False Sir John and its variations, Lady Isabel and the Elf Knight. The legends may have been the prototype of the Legend of Bluebeard.

== The story ==
Several versions of the story of Halewijn exist. In all of them, Lord Halewijn (Halewyn) is either an evil man, a magician, a demon or a faery lord who sings a magical song. Every woman (maiden) who hears this song is drawn towards him and goes to meet him in his forest, where he kills them. In one version he beheads them, in another he touches them with his magical sword upon which they turn into stone.

A princess (In one version her name is given as 'Machteld', but in most versions she remains nameless) hears the song and is drawn into the forest to meet Lord Halewijn. In some versions she knows about his reputation but has a plan, in others, she is warned on her way by a white bird. She meets Halewijn and lets herself fall under his spell. Together they ride to a field of gallows where he declares his intention to kill her, but impressed by her beauty, he allows her to pick her own death. The princess chooses to be beheaded, but implores Halewijn to take off his shirt so her blood will not stain him.

Maer trekt eerst uit uw opperst kleed.
Want maegdenbloed dat spreidt zoo breed,
Zoot u bespreide, het ware my leed.

Translation:

But first lay off your upper robe,
for maiden's blood it spreads so far,
if it stained you, it would be my grief.

Lord Halewijn lays off his sword and starts to undress, which was the princess' plan. In some versions, while he is pulling his robe over his head, the cloth of the robe muffles the magical song. In other versions, as he pulls the robe over his head, he can no longer use his spellbinding gaze. Other versions have him turn his back to the princess while undressing. Whatever version however, while undressing, the princess awakens from his spell and cuts off the head of the now helpless Halewijn with his own sword.

The princess takes the head with her and triumphantly returns home. On her way back she meets Halewijn's mother who asks her about her son. The princess then reveals to her Halewijn's fate. In the king's castle, the head is shown all over and the tale ends with a great celebration. One version however adds a footnote saying that the princess remained unmarried all her life because no suitor could ever match the passion she felt for Lord Halewijn.

== The ballad ==
Het Lied van Heer Halewijn (The song of Lord Halewijn) is a ballad in rhyme dating back to the Middle Ages. It was first recorded about 1830 by Jan Frans Willems, who combined several oral and printed sources into 40 verses. Most of the more popular versions do away with the more descriptive parts or delete several scenes (for instance the confrontation with Halewijn's mother) thus shortening the song to about 20 verses.

=== Dating ===
Jan Frans Willems collected and wrote down the lyrics of the ballad around 1830 and published it in 1848 on pages 116-119 of his book "Oude Vlaemsche Liederen" (Old Flemish Songs). Willems is said to have copied it from several one-sheet prints sold by market singers and before that the song was passed along orally. The nature of the story itself dates it back to the early Middle Ages, yet it contains several elements of Carolingian culture and therefore is generally accepted to be much older than the comparable Lady Isabel and the Elf Knight.

Since the ballad was passed along for centuries, it has been updated and changed all over its life and some verses may have even been added centuries after its original inception. In particular the ending line is thought to have been added after the 16th century as it uses the word 'Banket' (banquet) that only came into use around that time.

Daer wierd gehouden een banket,
Het hoofd werd op de tafel gezet.

Translation:

There was held a banquet,
(and) the head was set on the table.

=== Text and story ===
The ballad is written in the third person and although it focusses on the princess rather than Halewijn, it describes her actions rather than to tell the story from her point of view. As already mentioned, the version noted by Willems, which is the most complete, has 40 verses. Yet, as some key elements of the story are barely explained other minor details are elaborated over several lines.

As an example of the odd balance of the ballad compared to the story: A whole eight couplets tell of the princess asking first her father, then her mother, then her sister and finally her brother for permission to go to see Halewijn. After her brother finally gives her permission another six verses are used to describe the robes she dresses herself in. In contrast to that, the actual slaying of Halewijn only takes two lines and even there it is mentioned rather than described:

Eer dat zyn kleed getogen was,
Zyn hoofd lag voor zyn voeten ras.

Translation:

Before his shirt was pulled,
his head was lying before his feet already.

Also it is never fully stated who lord Halewijn is and why, or even how he kills the women he lures into his forest. This may be because the lines doing so have been lost over time, but more likely is that the ballad did not aim to tell the whole story, just to sing about it. The story itself was already known and did not need much explication.

In contrast to this, the ballad contains an element seldom mentioned in the stories: After Halewijn was decapitated, his head still continues speaking and implores the princess first to rub on his neck a pot of ointment taken from beneath the gallows, then to take Halewijn's horn, go into a cornfield and blow it "Dat al myn vrienden het hooren!" (so all my friends will hear). Of course the princess does neither but replies to the head: "Moordenaers raed en doen ik niet" (A murderer's advice I will not do). This time it might be the legend that has been streamlined while the ballad retained the original story.

=== Rhyme and rhythm ===
The ballad is made up of 40 short verses, most of them consisting of two lines of equal length rhyming at the end.

Heer Halewyn zong een liedekijn
Al die dat hoorde wou bi hem zijn.

Translation:

Lord Halewyn sang a song
and all who heard it wanted to be with him.

Over the course, several key verses add a third line rhyming with the two others.

Alsdan heeft hy tot haer gezeid:
Mits gy de schoonste maget zyt,
Zoo kiest uw dood! het is noch tyd.

Translation:

Then he said to her:
since you are the fairest maiden,
choose your death (while) you still have time.

this third line might be the remnant of another verse merged onto the previous one. It can also have been used to condense key scenes rather than string them out over two verses. Another possibility is that the song was originally sung in verses of three lines: In a normal verse, the singer would sing the first and second line once, then repeat the second as a conclusion. In key scenes, the third line replaces the repeated second line to speed up the action.

== Context ==
According to the Aarne-Thompson system of classifying folktale plots, the tale of Halewijn is type 311 (the heroine rescues herself from a supernatural foe). Similar tales are Fitcher's Bird, The Old Dame and Her Hen, and How the Devil Married Three Sisters and the tale shares more than a likeness with the various versions of Lady Isabel and the Elf Knight, Child ballad 4. Also noteworthy is the similarity between lord Halewijn and the legendary Bluebeard.

The Halewijn legend shares with all those tales the main theme of a woman lured by a powerful, handsome and implicitly sexual stranger who is in some way "otherworldly" or magical and hence has a bad fate in store for her. In contrast to most of the stories, the heroine rescues herself instead of being saved by her brothers or other kin.

In this, the tale is the closest to the 'Lady Isabel' ballads. Yet it differs from them by including several themes dating back to pre-medieval time and therefore is thought to be much older. In particular the scenes where the princess first asks her father, then her mother, then her sister for permission to go to see Halewijn before finally her brother gives her permission – "Als gy uw eer maer wel bewaerd / En gy uw kroon naer rechten draegt!" (...as long as you keep your honor and wear your crown with dignity) – alludes to the Carolingian custom of a brother watching over the honor of his sisters.

Next to the allusions to Bluebeard, the legend also contains elements (mythemes) of ancient Germanic legend, notably the idea that a nature spirit or faery can use a song to lure people into his realm, most typically his forest, where he causes their death.

Another mytheme is the outspoken sexual nature of Halewijn and his desires. Historically, Halewijn, handsome, powerful and sexual, might well be the deity of an ancient pagan fertility ritual. The fact that he is also a dangerous murderer might find its roots in the shunning of pagan folk rites by Christianity. The princess, although no saint, embodies Christian restraint. Even when she submits to being killed, she implores Halewijn to take off his shirt because it would be unfitting if her maiden (virgin) blood were to leave a stain on him.

Want maegdenbloed dat spreidt zoo breed
Zoot u bespreide, het ware my leed

Translation:

For maiden's blood it spreads so far,
if it would stain you, it would be my grief

The story also compares to the legend of the Scandinavian Nixen (strömkarlen), water spirits who played enchanted songs, luring women and children to drown (Meijer 1971:35). Several versions of the tale have the decapitation scene take place near a spring and in one version Halewijn boasts to the princess that he has drowned as many woman as he has hanged. The ballad itself only refers to the place of decapitation as a gallows field:

Zy kwamen al aen een galgenveld
Daer hing zoo menig vrouwenbeeld.

Translation:

They came upon a gallows field
There hung many a woman.

but clearly mentions that the princess did wash Halewijn's head in a well:

Zy nam het hoofd al by het haer,
En waschtet in een bronne klaer.

Translation:

She took the head by his hair,
and washed it in a spring well clear.

== Adaptations ==
Several modern adaptations of the story have been produced:

- Choral: Heer Halewijn by Willem Pijper, (1920)
- Opera: Halewijn by Willem Pijper, libretto written by Martinus Nijhoff, (1932–34)
- Short Story: Sir Halewyn by Alan Garner, in The Guizer: A Book of Fools (1975)
- Short Story: Sire Halewyn by Charles De Coster (Belgian writer), in Légendes flamandes (1858) (in French)
- Theater Play: Sire Halewyn by Michel de Ghelderode (1934), Produced Brussels, Théâtre Communal 21 Jan. 1938
- Novel: Halewijn by Else Boer (Dutch writer), (2026)

== Cited in footnote ==
- Meijer, Reinder. Literature of the Low Countries: A Short History of Dutch Literature in the Netherlands and Belgium. New York: Twayne Publishers, Inc., 1971, page 35.

== Other references ==
- Nygard, Holger Olof. The Ballad of Heer Halewijn, Its Forms and Variations in Western Europe: A Study of the History and Nature of a Ballad Tradition. Knoxville: University of Tennessee Press, 1958.
