= Monica Partridge =

Russian and Slavonic scholar

- Born: Monica Agnes McMain; 25 May 1915; Nottingham
- Died: 19 March 2008 (aged 92)
- Education: University of Nottingham
- Occupation: academic
- Employer: University of Nottingham

Prof. Monica Partridge born Monica Agnes McMain (25 May 1915 – 2008) was a British linguist and Russian and Serbo-Croatian scholar who was a benefactor to the University of Nottingham. She was the first woman to be a Professor at her university.

== Life ==
Partridge was born on 25 May 1915 in Nottingham to Florence Emma Marjorie born Roberts and John McMain. Her father was a teacher. She studied French at Nottingham University but later became intrigued by Russian. She began to study Russian at the School of Slavonic and East European Studies in London, in 1940. She undertook post graduate studies with Professor Simon Boyanus and won the Laura Soames Prize for her study of the phonetics of Russian.

Partridge did some (assistant) lecturing at University College London. After the war in 1947 she worked at her alma mater as a tutorial assistant.

She was encouraged by Janko Lavrin to begin a doctorate and she undertook a thesis into the time that Alexander Herzen spent in Russia. She would in time become an acknowledged expert on Herzen. In 1949 she was appointed to a lectureship in Russian at Nottingham as an Assistant Lecturer to Lavrin. Each summer she went to Slovenia where she established links with the University of Ljubljana. Because of her interest the University of Nottingham was able to establish student exchanges which also improved the opportunities for Yugoslav students. In 1967 she became the first woman to be appointed a Professor at Nottingham University. She gave her inaugural lecture in Oct 1968. Married to Maurice William Partridge, Professor of Pharmaceutical Chemistry at the University, they were the first married couple to hold chairs at the same University.

She led the university's department of Slavonic studies until she retired in 1980. The early years of her professorship coincided with the student revolts following the May '68 events in Paris. An occupation of the Trent building followed claims that the then professor of French had given a negative reference for a student on the grounds that he was a political activist. An office in her department was occupied by students who slept there overnight. Following this she had wooden blocks installed in the window frames to prevent access from outside. A subsequent 'review' in "Red blob", a journal of the university's Socialist Society was somewhat negative.

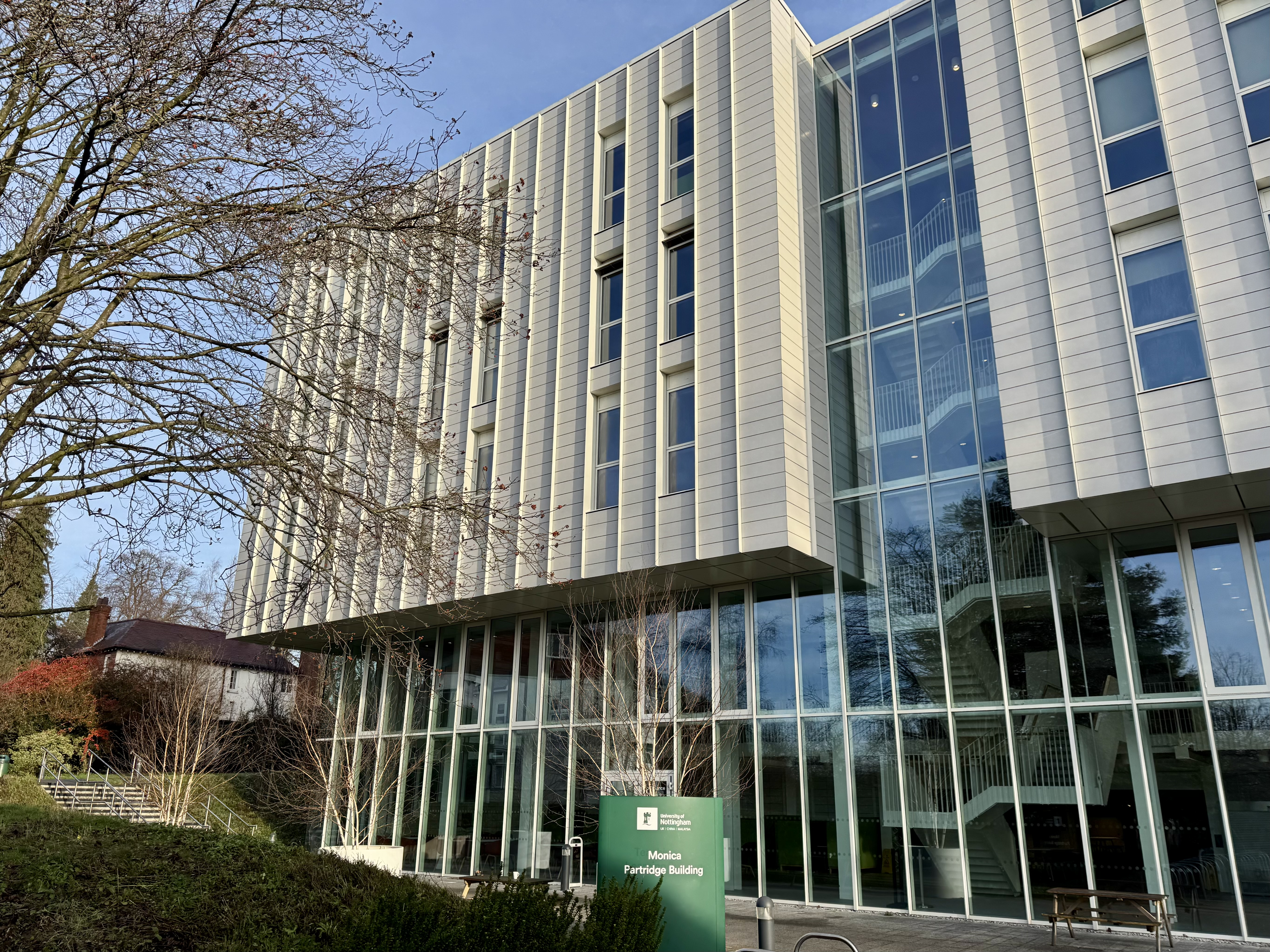
Monica Partridge Building Nottingham University photograph by Tina Pamplin

After she retired she was recognised as an emeritus professor. The Yugoslav government awarded her the Order of the Flag with Star. In 1990, when she was 75, a presentation was made to her of a series of essays titled "The Bell of Freedom". In 1993 she published a book detailing her studies of Alexander Herzen. When she died on 19 March 2008 she left a bequest to the university which assisted students to be granted fellowships. In 2020 she was honoured by having a university building named after her .

Papers relating to Monica Partridge are held at the University of Nottingham Manuscripts and Special Collections.
