= Harris repertoire =

The Harris Repertoire consists of two manuscripts, both written by the sisters Amelia and Jane Harris. Containing 29 and 59 ballads and songs respectively, these manuscripts are part of the cornerstone of nineteenth-century ballad collecting. The second manuscript written was used by Francis James Child (1825–1896) in his seminal work, The English and Scottish Popular Ballads, commonly known as the Child Ballads.

== History ==
In 1859 Amelia Harris sent William Edmonstoune Aytoun, a professor at the University of Edinburgh, a manuscript containing 29 ballads. She had heard him talk on the subject in Lerwick in 1855, and knew that he himself had published two volumes of "Antient Ballads". She enclosed a letter, which has become famous within ballad studies, for it not only presents the origin of the ballads she and her sister Jane knew, but offers the conundrum of ballads being passed from the non-literate to the literate. While the sisters knew, clearly loved, and sang the ballads, and did not re-create the tales, but sang what they knew, and were "most scrupulous in writing them exactly as I heard them, leaving a blank, when I was in doubt as to a word or line".

Aytoun was appreciative of the manuscript, and wrote to the sisters to thank them - we know this from surviving extract made by Jane Harris. He also informed other collectors, whom he was in contact with, such as the Aberdonian advocate Norval Clyne. Clyne was interested in the Harris sisters' version of "Sir Patrick Spens", as it provided evidence against the much-discussed "Lady Wardlaw Heresy", initiated by David Laing and perpetuated by Robert Chambers, which proposed that Lady Wardlaw was in fact the author of the ballad. While Aytoun's letter including the Harris sisters' version of the ballad came too late for Clyne to include it in the text of his refutation of Chambers' proposition, James Hutton Watson did use the Harris material - quoting a letter Aytoun had written to Clyne in its entirety.

== The search ==
Aytoun had intended to publish the Harris MS material, but did not live to prepare a third volume of ballads, but Clyne did keep the Harris ballads in mind, and when he was contacted by Dr John Stuart of General Register House, Edinburgh, who had a request from Francis James Child for advice and information on collecting ballads in Britain. Clyne advised Child to place an appeal in Notes and Queries regarding material and its location. Clyne himself became actively involved in Child's search, and was in correspondence with him. Having written to the publisher John Blackwood, to Aytoun's sisters - who were also fond of ballads - and to Aytoun's widow, who "was not on terms" with his family, and even following up leads in Newburgh, where the Harris sisters had been living when they sent the manuscript, Clyne drew a blank: the manuscript had vanished and 1873, Clyne and Child resigned themselves to the fact that the manuscript was lost and the ladies who had written it could not be traced.

== The second manuscript ==
On the same day that Clyne wrote to Child regarding the failure to trace either the 1859 ballad manuscript, or the women who had written it, Jane Harris was writing to Professor David Masson, Aytoun's successor as Professor of Rhetoric at the University of Edinburgh. Although she did not refer to Child's Notes and Queries appeal, it may have been the impetus for the sisters to try to contact someone about their ballads, as they had annotated their ballads and songs a second time. This letter was sent from Laurel Bank, Lasswade, near Edinburgh, which explains Clyne's failure to trace them in Newburgh.

Masson sent Jane Harris's letter on to Child and Child alerted Clyne. Clyne deduced that Miss Harris who wrote to Masson had to be the elusive Newburgh lady, and he made contact. On 26 August 1873, Clyne had tea with the Misses Harris and established an essential point of contact for Child. Clyne found that while Jane had written to Masson about the new manuscript, she had written the musical score, while her sister, Amelia, had written out the verses. The Misses Harris were clear about the origin of their ballads - they had learned them from their mother, who in turn had got them from "an aged nurse". This gave these sets an eighteenth-century provenance. He also discovered that they had sent a couple of ballads to Peter Buchan as well as Aytoun.

On the polite suggestion Jane Harris that the manuscript may be of worth, Clyne and Child agreed that some sum had to be agreed upon, and in a letter dated 15 September 1873, Amelia Harris noted that she had received a telegram from Frederick James Furnivall, whom Child was staying with in London in the summer of 1873, informing her that he had forwarded a cheque for £15 for the manuscript. She promises to send the manuscript of the ballads that afternoon, and the manuscript of the music the following day. Child was on the point of leaving for America - he had noted in his correspondence with Macmath that "from the 16th it will be safer to address me in America". We know that the manuscripts were bound - costing a further 6 shillings on top of the £15 paid. The cost in shillings indicates that this was done in Britain, and it seems that Furnivall may have taken responsibility for it. The manuscript was then forwarded to Child at Harvard. This manuscript remains in America, in the Houghton Library, MS 25241.17*, still bound in 3/4 maroon Morocco and marbled boards.

== The "lost and found" manuscript ==
Neither Child nor Clyne ever located the first manuscript. Its history after Aytoun's death is uncertain and obscure. However, it was discovered by Mr Hilary Corke in an Edinburgh bookshop-depository in 1955. It was among other books belonging to one Captain Forbes: the flyleaf of this bound volume is inscribed "Capt. Forbes, R. N., Seabank". The Forbes books had been deposited before 1939 and had not been disturbed between that time and 1955. This MS contained only the texts, and having noted that Amelia Harris refers to the writing down of the airs, an extremely thorough search was made for the airs manuscript in the depository, but it was not found and remains lost.

This manuscript is also bound, probably under Aytoun's instruction. It has a maroon cover, with the wording "M.S. OLD SCOTTISH BALLADS" on its spine, marbled endpapers and Hilary Corke's bookplate inside the front cover. Hilary Corke, a lecturer in Mediaeval English Literature at the University of Edinburgh, realised the value of his find, and wrote to Harvard University for information about the Harris MS listed by Child as being in Harvard College Library - a correspondence passed on to the curator of the Houghton Library. The important discovery of the "lost" manuscript was first made in print in 1977 by Dr Emily Lyle of The School of Scottish Studies, University of Edinburgh, although she had been in touch with Hilary Corke for a couple of years prior to that.

== The manuscripts brought together ==
Emily Lyle, along with Anne Dhu McLucas and Kaye McAlpine, produced a publication entitled The Song Repertoire of Amelia and Jane Harris, which collated the texts of the two Harris MSS into one volume, with each ballad being assigned a full spread, in order to facilitate parallel study of the texts. Jane Harris's tunes and basses appear at the head of each relevant 1873 ballad, while the edited version appears at the head of the 1859 version. The editors also provided a comprehensive biography of the sisters, along with a full account of the manuscripts, and also the procedure undertaken to make Jane Harris's music operate for a modern musician.
