= Hardwick, Cherwell =

Village in Oxfordshire, England

Coordinates: 51.962°N 1.162°W

Hardwick
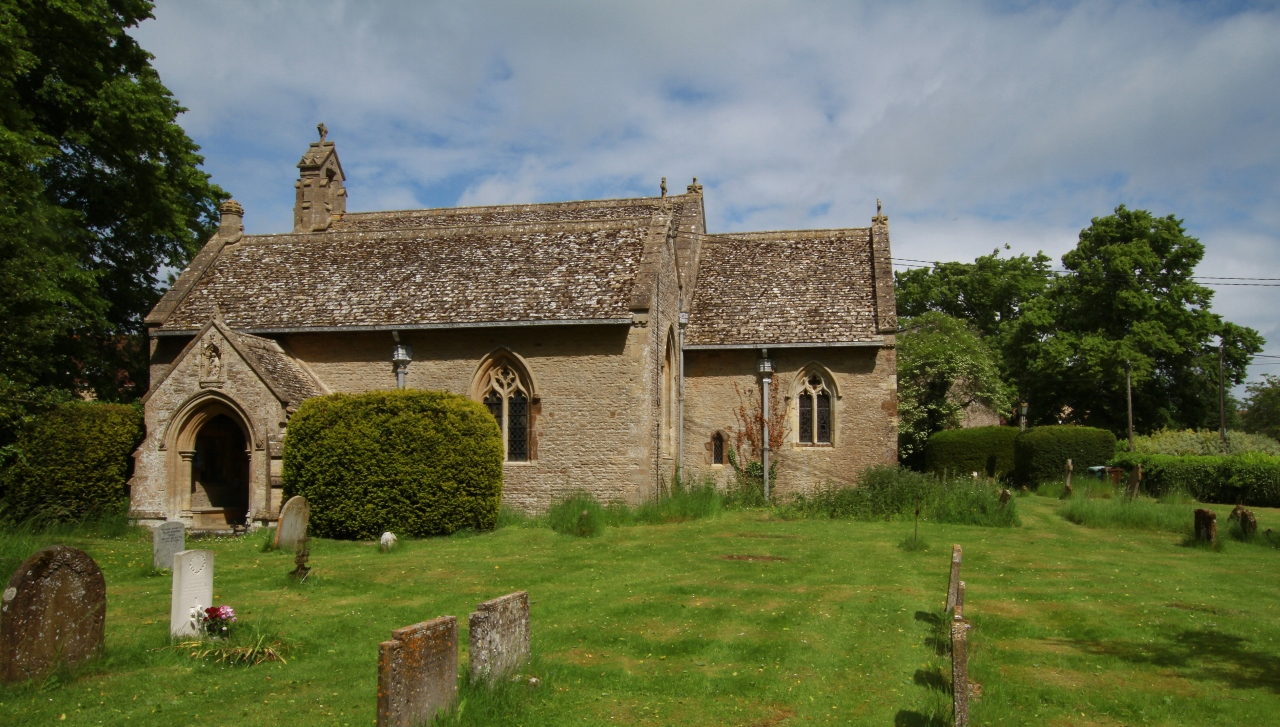
- Parish church of St Mary the Virgin

- Location within Oxfordshire
- OS grid reference: SP5729
- Civil parish: Hardwick with Tusmore
- District: Cherwell
- Shire county: Oxfordshire
- Region: South East
- Country: England
- Sovereign state: United Kingdom
- Post town: Bicester
- Postcode district: OX27
- Police: Thames Valley
- Fire: Oxfordshire
- Ambulance: South Central
- UK Parliament: Banbury

Hardwick is a village in the civil parish of Hardwick with Tusmore, the Cherwell district, in Oxfordshire, England, about 4.5 miles (7 km) north of Bicester.

In 1931 the parish had a population of 37. On 1 April 1932 the parish was abolished and merged with Tusmore to form "Hardwick with Tusmore".

== Manor ==
The village's toponym comes from the Old English for a farm or dwelling place for sheep. The Domesday Book of 1086 records it as Hardewich and a charter from AD 1130 records it as Herdewic.

After the Norman Conquest of England Walter Giffard held the manor of Hardwick, but the Domesday Book records that by 1086 he had given it to Robert D'Oyly in an exchange of lands. It descended with D'Oyly's heirs until 1232 when it passed to Thomas de Beaumont, 6th Earl of Warwick.

William Fermor of Somerton bought a third of the manor of Hardwick in 1514 and had acquired the remainder by 1548.

The house at Manor Farm was built late in the 16th century. The Fermors usually let it to tenant farmers. It is now a Grade II* listed building.

Some of the farmland in the parish seems to have been enclosed in the 16th century for sheep pasture, but there was still an open field system of three fields by 1601. By 1682 parts of Heath Field and Mill Field had been enclosed, and by 1717 the enclosure of Heath Field was complete. Enclosure of the remainder of the parish was complete well before 1784, when Tinker's Field and the remainder of Mill Field were described as having been enclosed "from time immemorial".

In 1857 Henry Howard, 2nd Earl of Effingham bought the estates of Tusmore and Hardwick. In 1869–70 he demolished the old cottages of the village and replaced them with new ones of stone with brick quoins. He built a village school which was finished in 1873, and his heir Henry Howard, 3rd Earl of Effingham maintained the school until at least 1895. However, the 3rd Earl died in 1898 and by 1903 the school had closed. It is now a private house.

== Church and chapel ==
=== Parish church ===
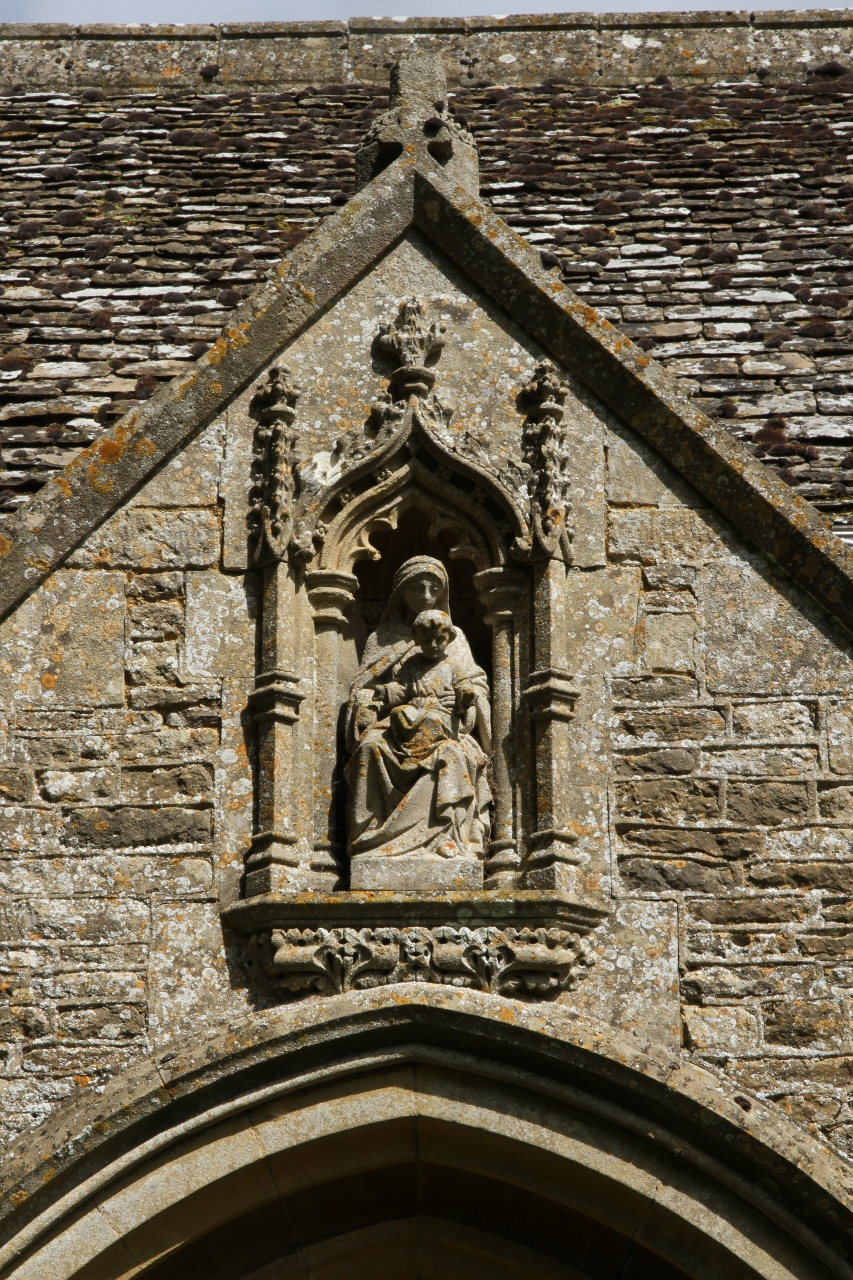
Gothic Revival niche over the south porch of the church of St Mary the Virgin, with a relief of the Madonna and Child

By the middle of the 12th century, the parish was a chapelry of Stoke Lyne, and by 1249 or 1250 Hardwick had become a separate ecclesiastical parish. The Knights Hospitaller owned the advowson by 1252, and held it until Henry VIII suppressed the Order in England in 1540. In 1545 The Crown sold the advowson to an associate of William Fermor, the lord of the manor. The advowson remained with the Fermors until the middle of the 19th century, when their direct line died out and their estates at Tusmore and Hardwick were sold.

The earliest parts of the Church of England parish church of St Mary the Virgin are the north and south doorways. Dr Mary Lobel says the doorways are from late in the 12th or early in the 13th century, but Sherwood and Pevsner states they are Decorated Gothic which would give them a later date of 1250–1350. The chancel is Decorated Gothic and certainly from the 14th century. The nave was rebuilt in the 15th century with a large new Perpendicular Gothic west window. In 1877 Henry Howard, 2nd Earl of Effingham commissioned George Gilbert Scott, Jr. to restore the church. Scott virtually rebuilt it and added the south aisle, porch and bell-turret.

The east window of the chancel has some 14th-century Medieval stained glass plus a 19th-century Gothic Revival panel by Clayton and Bell. The Gothic Revival west window of the nave is by Burlison and Grylls but incorporates late 15th- or early 16th-century Gothic panels.

St Mary's is now a member of the Shelswell Benefice.

=== Roman Catholic chapel ===
The Fermors were recusants and supported the continuation of Roman Catholicism in the area from the English Reformation in the 16th century until after the Roman Catholic Relief Act 1791. Late in the 16th century and early in the 17th there were few recusants in Hardwick, but after the Fermors moved from Somerton to Tusmore in 1625 their numbers increased. Roman Catholics formed more than half the village by the 1760s and the overwhelming majority by 1802. Roman Catholic villages went to Mass at the Fermor chapel in Tusmore until 1768, when Tusmore House was being rebuilt and the chapel was closed for refurbishment. A chapel was then established in the attic of Hardwick Manor Farm, which remained in use for worship until the priest died in 1830. The chapel was succeeded in 1832 by a newly built Roman Catholic church at Hethe, just over 1 mile (1.6 km) east of Hardwick.

== Sources and further reading ==
- Blomfield, James Charles (1887). Part III: History of Cottisford, Hardwick and Tusmore. Deanery of Bicester. Bristol: J.W. Arrowsmith.
- Ekwall, Eilert (1960) [1936]. Concise Oxford Dictionary of English Place-Names (4th ed.). Oxford: Oxford University Press. Hardwick. ISBN 0198691033.
- Lobel, Mary D, ed. (1959). A History of the County of Oxford. Victoria County History. Vol. 6: Ploughley Hundred. London: Oxford University Press for the Institute of Historical Research. pp. 168–173.
- Sherwood, Jennifer; Pevsner, Nikolaus (1974). Oxfordshire. The Buildings of England. Harmondsworth: Penguin Books. pp. 632–633, 646. ISBN 978-0-14-071045-8.
