= Lark Rise =

1939 novel by Flora Thompson

- First edition
- Author: Flora Thompson
- Cover artist: Lynton Lamb
- Language: English
- Genre: Novel
- Publisher: Oxford University Press
- Publication date: 1939
- Publication place: England
- Media type: Print
- Preceded by: (first in the Lark Rise to Candleford trilogy)
- Followed by: Over to Candleford

Lark Rise is a 1939 semi-autobiographical novel by the English author Flora Thompson. It was illustrated by Lynton Lamb.

In 1945, the book was republished as part of the trilogy Lark Rise to Candleford, comprising the novels Lark Rise (1939), Over to Candleford (1941), and Candleford Green (1943).

== Plot ==
The novel follows the childhood of Laura Timmins in the small rural northern Oxfordshire hamlet of Lark Rise and the surrounding countryside. It is a part-lyrical, part-documentary portrait of the actual hamlet, Juniper Hill, where the author was born.

== Critical analysis ==
Laura represents the author Flora Thompson herself, born Flora Timms. According to Richard Mabey in his 2014 book Dreams of the Good Life, the author "tells most of the story as a reminiscing adult, but presents Laura's view when she wants to lighten the tone of an example, or show it through the vivid, unmediated vision of a girl. Sometimes the viewpoint of adult and child are deliberately played against one another, with a kind of wry dramatic irony".

The novel is neither a straight memoir nor an objective social history, but an imaginary reconstruction of what life felt like to a growing country child in the last years of the 19th century.

== See also ==
- Lark Rise to Candleford, the trilogy of which this novel is a part.
