= Hardwick with Tusmore =

Civil parish in Oxfordshire, England

Coordinates: 51.970°N 1.174°W

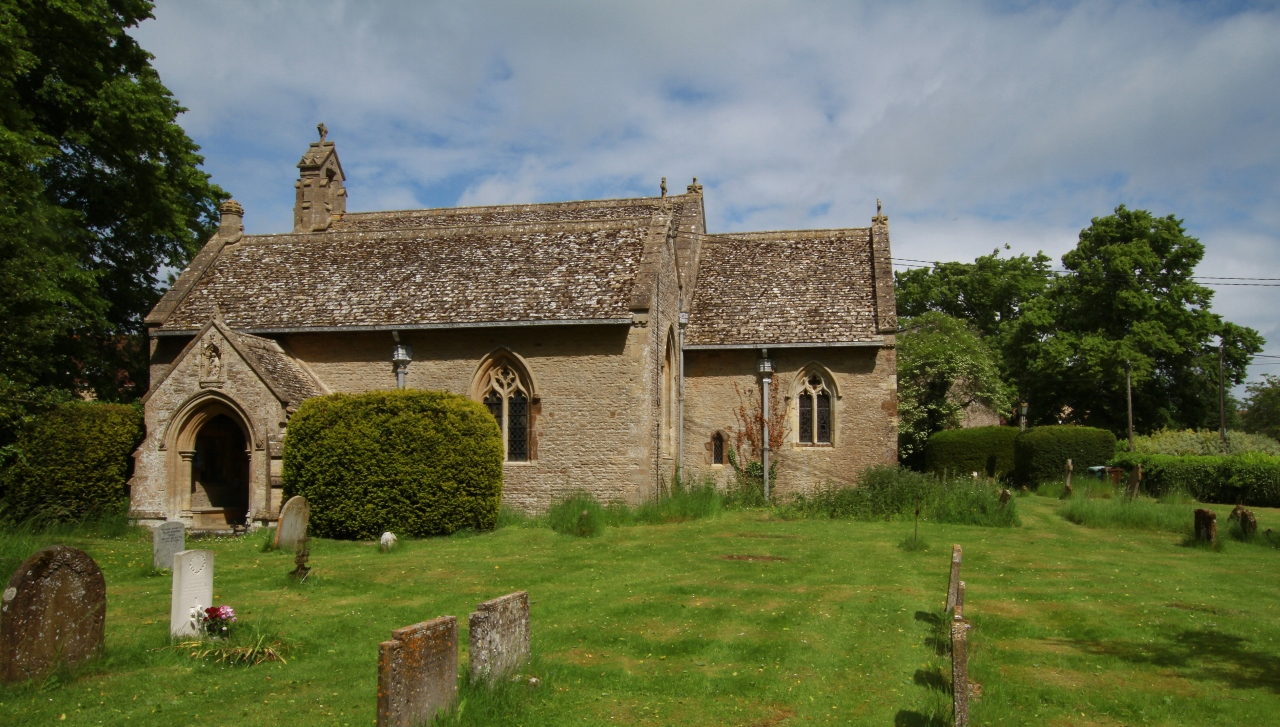
- Hardwick church

- Location within Oxfordshire
- Population: 63 (2001 census)
- Civil parish: Hardwick with Tusmore
- District: Cherwell
- Shire county: Oxfordshire
- Region: South East
- Country: England
- Sovereign state: United Kingdom
- UK Parliament: Bicester and Woodstock

Hardwick with Tusmore is a civil parish in the Cherwell district, in the county of Oxfordshire, England. It was formed in 1932 by merger of the parishes of Hardwick (grid reference SP5729) and Tusmore (grid reference SP5630). In 2001 it had a population of 63.

== Sources ==
- Lobel, Mary D., ed. (1959). Victoria County History: A History of the County of Oxford: Volume 6.
