= Nora Fry Lavrin =

English engraver, book illustrator and painter (1897–1985)

Nora Lavrin
- Born: 1897; Liverpool, England
- Died: 30 August 1985 (aged 87–88); London, England
- Education: Liverpool School of Art; Académie de la Grande Chaumière; Royal College of Art
- Known for: Engraver, book illustrator, painter

Nora Lavrin, née Fry (1897 – 30 August 1985), was an English engraver, book illustrator and painter. She illustrated twenty editions of children's books.

== Early life ==
Nora Fry was born in Liverpool, the daughter of Canadian-born Ambrose Fry, an urban landlord and chemical manufacturer, and Lydia (Lily) Thompson, who was from the Shetland Isles. Nora's brother, architect Maxwell Fry, in his autobiography mentions their mother playing the piano and that she had painted. She had an older sister Muriel Fry, and two younger brothers, Edwin Maxwell Fry and Sydney Fry.

Nora Lavrin studied arts with her sister Muriel at the Liverpool School of Art. She won a travelling scholarship in 1920 and spent a year in Paris attending the Académie de la Grande Chaumière. She also traveled in the provinces, particularly Semur-en-Auxois where she did drawings and watercolors. Lavrin began her career as an illustrator of children's books in 1926, with designs for The Little Grey Men of the Moor by Betty Timms for Harrap. In 1927 she illustrated two more books, both of which ran to several editions. Her illustration of Aesop’s Fables (1927 and 1934) ran to eight editions between 1927 and 1989. She also illustrated A Treasure of Tales for Little Folks (1927) which ran several versions in the 1930s. In September 1927 she entered the Engraving School of the Royal College of Art, RCA, in Kensington where she specialized in engraving and etching under Robert Austin. Lavrin left the RCA in July 1928 having achieved her Certificate in Etching.

In July 1928 Nora Fry married Janko Lavrin. Her marriage to Lavrin, Professor of Slavonic Studies at Nottingham University College, introduced her to Slovenia and Yugoslavia, a region she memorialized with some of her dry point landscape sketches in Slovenia Summer (1928) and Yugoslav Scenes (1935). The couple had two children, John Lavrin, a painter, and David H. Lavrin, an immunologist. From 1935 to 1937 she joined the University College of Nottingham as an art teacher. In the 1920s and 1930s she exhibited at the Royal Academy Summer exhibition; Liverpool Autumn Exhibition, Nottingham Society of Artists and galleries in England and, later in 1961, in Ljubljana, Yugoslavia. Several of her works appeared in The Studio, Creative Art, La Revue Moderne and Mladika.

== World War II ==
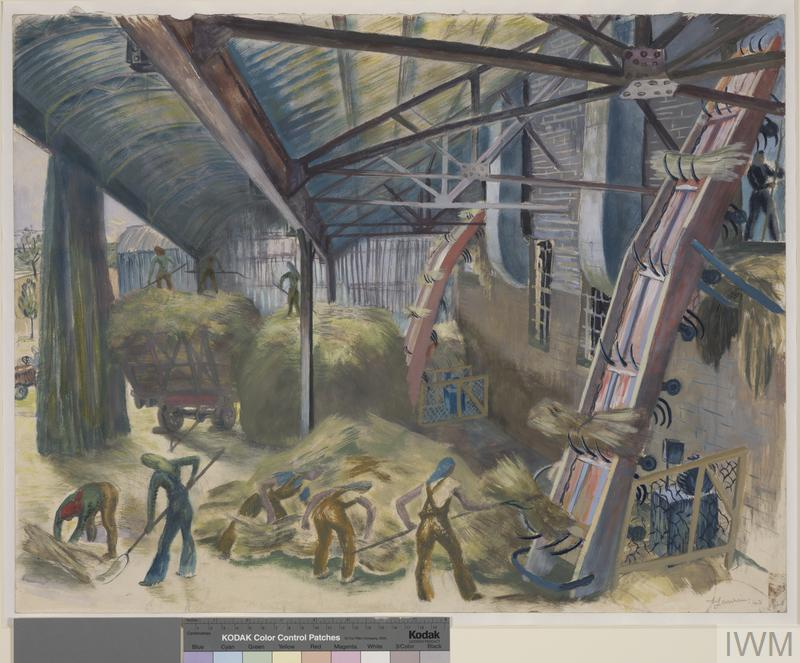
Land Girls unloading Flax, 1943, (Art.IWM ART LD 3587)

During World War II the Lavrins were living in London. Janko Lavrin worked for the BBC World Service and Nora taught at a number of the art schools, including the Hammersmith School of Art, that had remained open during the conflict. Nora spent time outside London recording the work done by the Women's Land Army, and several of these pieces were purchased by the War Artists' Advisory Committee and are held by the Imperial War Museum. Lavrin continued to illustrate books including Averil Demuth's Trudi and Hansel (1938) and Hilda Lewis's The Ship that Flew (1939, 1986). She also illustrated Elisabeth Kyle’s The Seven Sapphires (1944), Holly Hotel (1945), Mirror of Castle Doone (1947) and Lost Karin (1947).

== Later life ==
After the War Lavrin illustrated books on Slovene literature such as Vladimir Levstik, An Adder’s Nest (1931, 1943), Ivan Cankar’s The Bailiff Yerney and his Rights (London 1946), and The Ward of Our Lady of Mercy (Slovenia 1976), and Matej Bor’s A Wanderer in the Atomic Age (1967 and 1970). She illustrated translations of several English classics into Slovene such as Villete by Charlotte Brontë (Ljubljana 1965), The Tenant of Wildfell Hall by Anne Brontë, and The Return of the Native, Far from the Madding Crowd and The Mayor of Casterbridge by Thomas Hardy. Among her publications is a personal memoir of the relationship between D. H. Lawrence, Jessie Chambers, a friend of his youth portrayed in Sons and Lovers, and Frieda Weekley (née von Richthofen), his mistress and wife. It was published posthumously in 1986 as D. H. Lawrence. Nottingham Connections. The book has 23 woodcuts by Lavrin, and a review in The D.H. Lawrence Review said "Despite the book's many shortcomings, students of Lawrence will want at least to thumb through the pictures".

In 1952 she published The Hop Dog (1952) in collaboration with Molly Thorp. The story was later adapted into a children’s film, Adventure in the Hopfields (1954). Lavrin's interest in ballet sets and costumes resulted in her designs for Love and Litigation, choreographed by Pino Mlakar for the Slovene National Dance Company in 1956. She left sketches of the Ballet Russe de Monte-Carlo when it toured England in the 1930s.

Lavrin made portraits and sketches from daily life on paper in the 1950s. Her landscape oil works and watercolour portraits of her children and family are mostly held in private collections. The Ashmolean Museum at Oxford has a collection of her original illustrations. She is represented in the collection of the Maribor Art Gallery in Slovenia. Her drypoints of Yugoslavia published in 1935 captured a region that would change irreversibly after the Second World War.
