= Janko Lavrin =

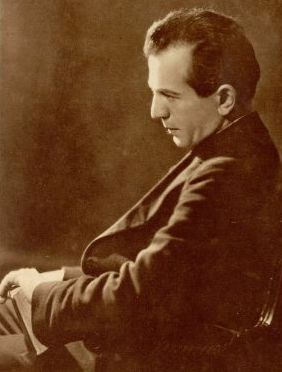
- Lavrin, 1920s
- Born: February 10, 1887; White Carniola, Slovenia
- Died: August 13, 1986 (aged 99); London, United Kingdom
- Occupations: Novelist, poet, critic, translator, and historian
- Spouse: Nora Fry Lavrin

Janko Lavrin (Russian: Я́нко Ива́нович Лаври́н; 10 February 1887 – 13 August 1986) was a Slovene novelist, poet, critic, translator, and historian. He was Professor of Slavonic Studies at the University of Nottingham. An enthusiast for psycho-analysis, he wrote what he called 'psycho-critical studies' of Ibsen, Nietzsche and Tolstoy.

== Biography ==
Lavrin was born in Krupa, White Carniola, Slovenia. He was educated in Austria, Russia and Scandinavia, moving to St Petersburg in 1908 to study Russian language and literature. He was a journalist in St Petersburg before World War I. In 1915 and 1916 he served as war correspondent for Novoye Vremya covering the Serbian army's retreat through Albania.

Returning to Russia in 1917, Lavrin decided to stay in the UK. He found work as a journalist, becoming part of the circle around A. R. Orage. In 1919 Bernard Pares helped Lavrin to get a teaching job at the University of Nottingham, and he became Professor of Slavonic Studies there in 1923.

Lavrin was a friend of the Russian critic D. S. Mirsky in London in the 1920s. In 1928 he married the artist and book illustrator Nora Fry. In 1934–1935 he edited The European Quarterly with Edwin Muir. During World War II he joined the BBC, broadcasting to occupied Europe. He rejoined Nottingham University part-time in 1944.

He encouraged a teaching assistant, Monica Partridge, to begin a doctorate. In 1949 she was appointed as an Assistant Lecturer to Lavrin.

After Lavrin's retirement in 1952 Monica Partridge would lead the university's department of Slavic studies. Meanwhile, Lavrin continued to write and translate.

== Works ==
- В стране вечной войны: Албанские эскизы (In the country in the spring of war: Albanian sketches), Petrograd, 1916.
- "Dostoevsky and His Creation: a psycho-critical study", London, 1920
- Tolstoy: a psycho-critical study, London, 1922
- Studies in European literature, London, 1929
- Aspects of modernism: from Wilde to Pirandello, London, 1935
- An introduction to the Russian novel, New York and London, 1943
- Dostoevsky: a study, New York, 1943
- Pushkin and Russian literature, London, 1947
- Tolstoy: an approach, London, 1948
- From Pushkin to Mayakovsky: a study in the evolution of literature, London, 1948
- Ibsen: an approach, London, 1950
- Nikolai Gogol, 1809-1852: a centenary survey, London, 1951
- Goncharov, New Haven, 1953
- Russian writers: their lives and literature, 1954
- Lermontov, London, 1959
- Russia, Slavdom and the Western World, London, 1969
- Nietzsche: a biographical introduction, 1971
- A panorama of Russian literature, London, 1973
- "Introduction to the Work of Vladimir Solovyov". Transformations of Eros: An Odyssey from Platonic to Christian Eros. Grailstone Press. 2004. pp. 7–23. ISBN 1-59650-001-8.
