= Juniper Hill =

Hamlet in Oxfordshire, England

Coordinates: 51.988°N 1.158°W

- Location within Oxfordshire
- OS grid reference: SP579324
- Civil parish: Cottisford
- District: Cherwell
- Shire county: Oxfordshire
- Region: South East
- Country: England
- Sovereign state: United Kingdom
- Post town: Brackley
- Postcode district: NN13
- Dialling code: 01280
- Police: Thames Valley
- Fire: Oxfordshire
- Ambulance: South Central
- UK Parliament: Banbury

Juniper Hill is a hamlet in the civil parish of Cottisford in Oxfordshire, England, 2 miles (3.2 km) south of Brackley in neighbouring Northamptonshire.

Juniper Hill was named after the common juniper, Juniperus communis, which originally grew in the area. In 1754, there were only two cottages in the area, but on the 1841 census there are 16 households in the village, and by 1901 25. The local inn, established about 1860, was the Fox.

Flora Thompson was born in Juniper Hill in 1876. She fictionalised the hamlet as Lark Rise in her Lark Rise to Candleford trilogy.

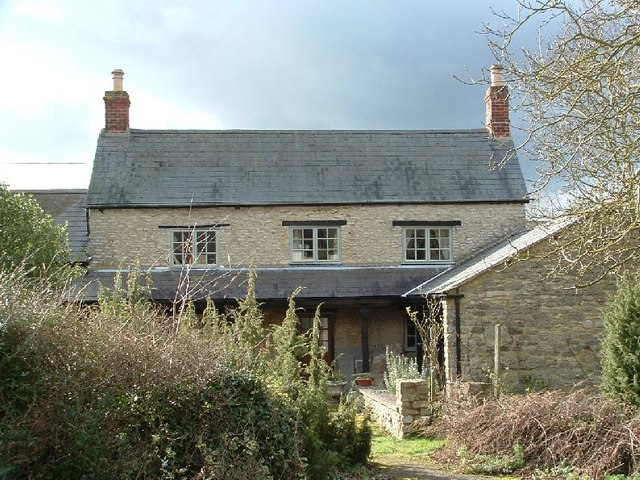
Juniper Hill House
