= Tusmore, Oxfordshire =

Coordinates: 51.967°N 01.176°W

Tusmore
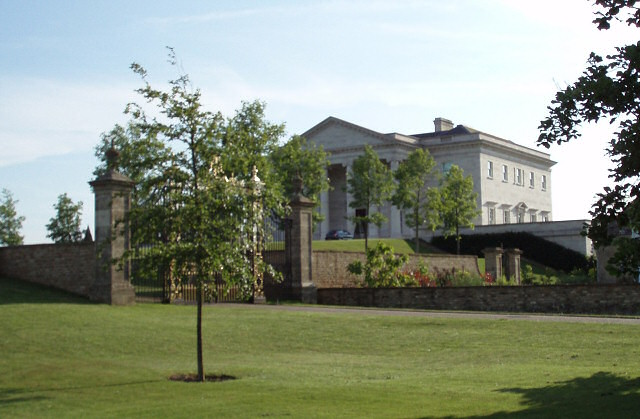
- Tusmore - the present house designed by Sir William Whitfield is at least the fourth on the site

- Location within Oxfordshire
- OS grid reference: SP5630
- Civil parish: Hardwick with Tusmore
- District: Cherwell
- Shire county: Oxfordshire
- Region: South East
- Country: England
- Sovereign state: United Kingdom
- Post town: Bicester
- Postcode district: OX27
- Dialling code: 01869
- Police: Thames Valley
- Fire: Oxfordshire
- Ambulance: South Central
- UK Parliament: Banbury

Tusmore is a settlement in the civil parish of Hardwick with Tusmore, in the Cherwell district, in Oxfordshire, England, about 5 1/2 miles (9 km) north of Bicester. It is the location of the Tusmore country house and estate.

In 1931 the parish had a population of 82. On 1 April 1932 the parish was abolished and merged with Hardwick to form "Hardwick with Tusmore".

== Manor ==
Tusmore was settled in Saxon times. The toponym comes from Old English, either Thures mere ("Thur's pool") or Þyrsmere ("a lake haunted by a giant or demon").

The Domesday Book records that in 1086 the manor of Tusmore belonged to Walter Giffard, 1st Earl of Buckingham.

By the early part of the 14th century Tusmore was the poorest village in the Ploughley Hundred. Thereafter it was depopulated by the Black Death. By 1358 the village had been abandoned and Sir Roger de Cotesford was licensed to enclose the abandoned land. The fact that Tusmore was not required to pay tax in 1428 indicates that by then it had fewer than ten householders.

The Fermor family were lords of the manor of Tusmore from 1606 until 1828, and Tusmore House was their family seat from about 1625 until 1810. In 1828 the last William Fermor died without a male heir and left the estate to his adopted daughter and her husband, John and Maria Turner Ramsay. In 1857 the Ramsays sold the estate to Henry Howard, 2nd Earl of Effingham. In 1929 the heir of Henry Alexander Gordon Howard, 4th Earl of Effingham sold the estate to Vivian Smith, a merchant banker who in 1938 was created 1st Baron Bicester of Tusmore. Late in the 1990s the Smiths sold Tusmore to the Syrian billionaire Wafic Saïd.

== Church and chapel ==
Records suggest that Tusmore may have had a parish church by 1074, and it certainly existed by 1236. After the depopulation of Tusmore in the 14th century the church continued as a chapel or free chapel, and fragments of 15th century masonry found on the site indicate that it was rebuilt at that time. It seems to have ceased to exist by the early part of the 16th century, as records of episcopal visitations at that time make no mention of Tusmore. However, the living continued to exist until 1840 when it was united with that of Hardwick. The place names "Church Yard" and "Churchyard Close" indicate roughly where the parish church once stood.

The Fermors were recusants and supported the continuation of Roman Catholicism in Tusmore and neighbouring villages from the English Reformation in the 16th century until after the Roman Catholic Relief Act 1791. The family always had a resident priest, usually a Jesuit, and several Fermors entered religious orders. All of the Fermor's staff were Roman Catholics, and attended Mass at the Fermor chapel at Tusmore along with co-religionists form neighbouring villages. This practice continued uninterrupted except for a period from 1768 when Tusmore House was being rebuilt and the chapel was being refurbished (see below). Mass at Tusmore resumed thereafter and continued until 1810 when the last William Fermor moved out of the house and his priest moved to Hardwick. The chapel was burned down in 1837 and was not rebuilt.

== Tusmore Park ==
Sir Roger de Cotesford or his successors may have built a manor house at Tusmore. It does not survive, but an early 16th-century combined granary and dovecote on staddle stones remains. It is an oak-framed building, which is unusual in a part of England historically dominated by stone buildings. The granary and dovecote are now a Grade II* listed building.

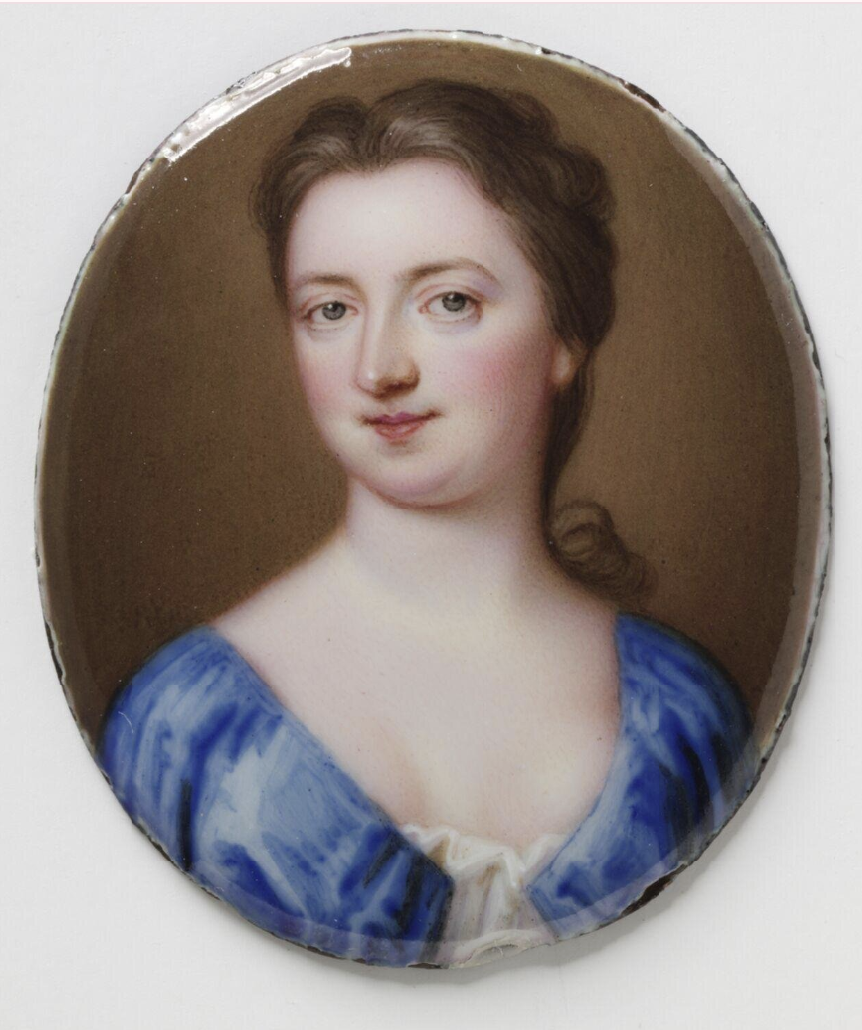
Arabella Fermor

The Fermors' house at Tusmore was large, for in 1665 it was assessed as having 19 hearths for the hearth tax. It was built of local stone and had a Roman Catholic chapel as well as ornamental gardens and a fish pond. After 1758 William Fermor had the house demolished except for the chapel and commissioned the Scottish architect Robert Mylne to design a new house. The exterior was completed by 1770 and the interior by 1779. Mylne's house was of seven bays and built of local stone, most of it from Fritwell. Mylne laid out the gardens and landscaped the park, the latter with a lake and an ornamental Temple of Peace dedicated to the late poet Alexander Pope (1688–1744). Pope had been a friend of the Fermor family and in 1712 had written The Rape of the Lock about an incident in which Robert Petre, 7th Baron Petre had offended Arabella Fermor.

In 1857 the new owner, the 2nd Earl of Effingham, commissioned the Scottish architect William Burn to build an office wing on the site of the chapel, which had burned down in 1837. This was completed along with alterations to the house in 1858. After 1929 Vivian Smith had the house restored, most of the Victorian office wing demolished and some other alterations made. Despite the 1858 and 1929 alterations, a number of the principal rooms retained their original 18th-century ceilings in the style of Robert Adam. Smith greatly changed the gardens and park, retaining little of Milne's landscape design except the Temple of Peace and the lake.

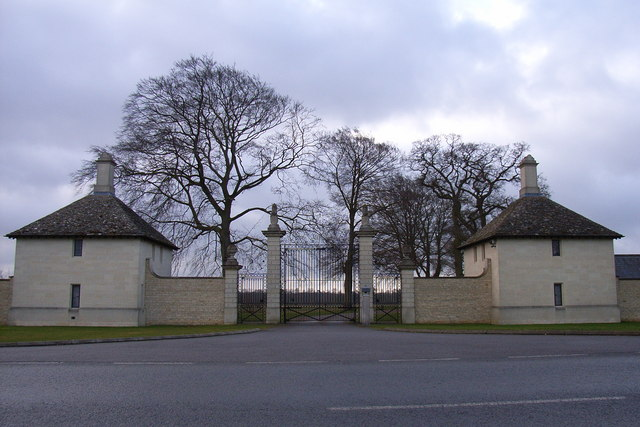
Gate lodges to Tusmore Park designed by Whitfield Lockwood Architects

In 1960 Randal Smith, 2nd Baron Bicester had the house demolished, which Sherwood and Pevsner condemned as "a great loss to a county in which important houses of the last quarter of the C18 are few". The stables were retained and are now a separate dwelling. In 1964–65 the architect Claud Phillimore designed a new Tusmore House on the site in a neo-Georgian manner, significantly smaller than the house by Mylne. In 1970 the 2nd Baron died in a car accident and was succeeded by his nephew Angus Smith, 3rd Baron Bicester.

In 2000, the new owner Wafic Saïd replaced Phillimore's house with a grander Anglo-Palladian design on the same site designed by Sir William Whitfield (1920–2019) of Whitfield Lockwood Architects. The house has a two-storey entrance front and a three-storey garden front. In the centre of the house is a three-storey circular staircase hall, reminiscent of that at New Wardour Castle. In 2004 the Georgian Group gave the completed house its award for the "best new building in the Classical tradition", although doctrinaire modernist architectural critics have been sceptical. Outbuildings, lodges and a monumental obelisk to commemorate the Millennium have been completed for Wafic Saïd, all to the design of Whitfield Lockwood. As part of extensive landscape works the patte d'oie has been reinstated and a wide double avenue from the entrance to the house and terminating at the obelisk established.

== Air crash ==
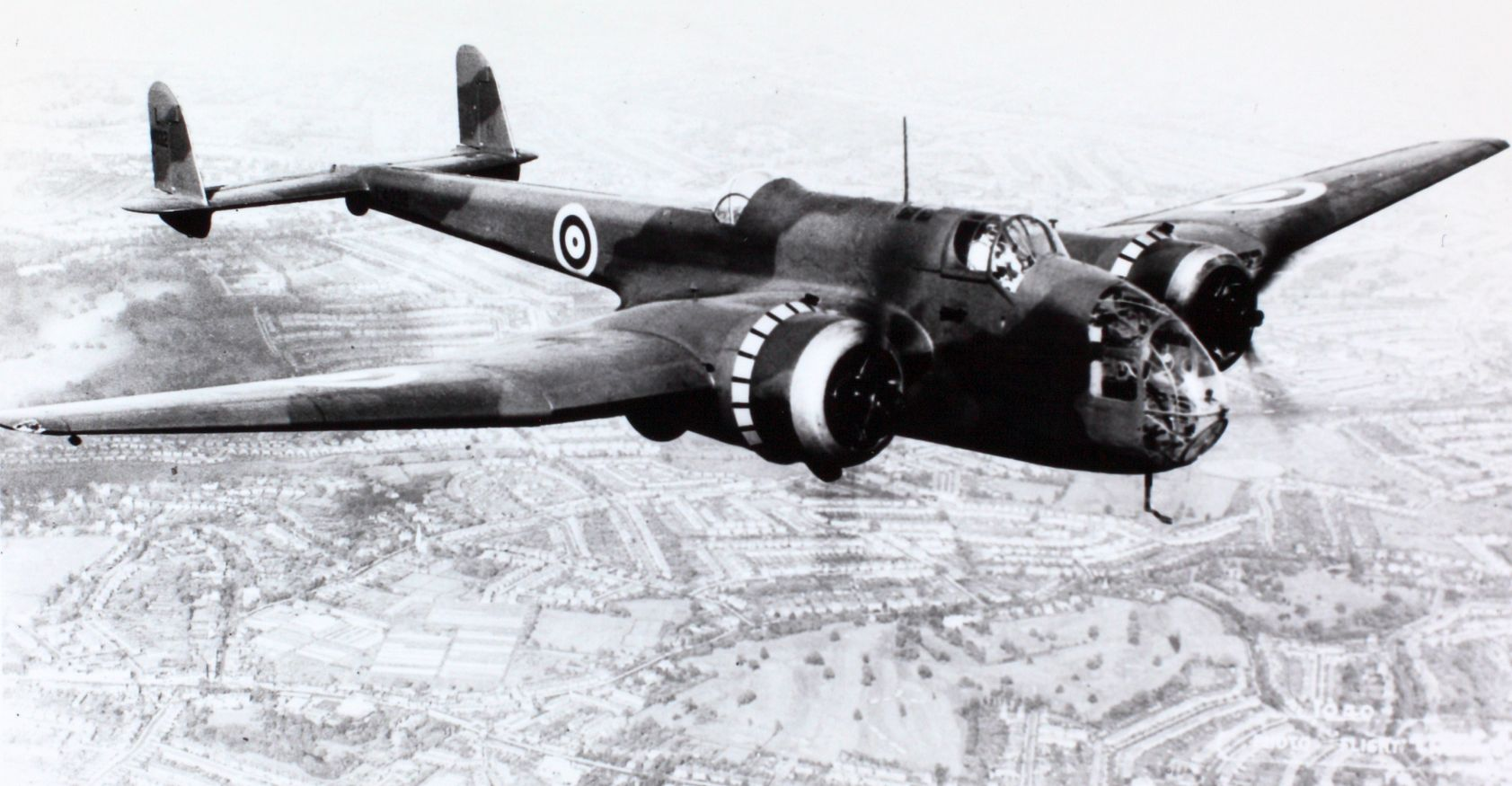
A Handley Page Hampden aircraft similar to that shot down at Tusmore

On 2 September 1941 a Junkers Ju 88 fighter-bomber of Luftwaffe Nachtjagdgeschwader 2, flown by flying ace Oblt Paul Semrau, bombed RAF Upper Heyford. Meanwhile, a Handley Page Hampden I aircraft, P5314 of No. 16 Operational Training Unit RAF, had been on a night training flight and was preparing to land at its base, RAF Croughton. Semrau fired cannon and machine guns at the Hampden, which caught fire and then crashed into a field near Tusmore Park, killing all four members of the crew.

The Hampden crew were members of the Royal Air Force Volunteer Reserve. The pilot, P/O NP van der Merwe, was from Salisbury in Southern Rhodesia. He and two other crew are buried in the Commonwealth War Graves Commission section of St Mary's parish churchyard, Upper Heyford. The fourth is buried in St Andrew's parish churchyard, Kingsbury, northwest London.

== Sources and further reading ==
- Blomfield, James Charles (1887). Part III: History of Cottisford, Hardwick and Tusmore. Deanery of Bicester. Bristol: JW Arrowsmith.
- Lobel, Mary D, ed. (1959). A History of the County of Oxford. Victoria County History. Vol. 6: Ploughley Hundred. London: Oxford University Press for the Institute of Historical Research. pp. 333–338.
- Miles, David; Rowley, Trevor (1976). "Tusmore Deserted Village". Oxoniensia. XLI. Oxfordshire Architectural and Historical Society: 309–315.
- Mudd, Andy (2003). "A New Romano-British Settlement Enclosure at Tusmore DMV". Oxoniensia. LXVII. Oxfordshire Architectural and Historical Society: 427–429.
- Sherwood, Jennifer; Pevsner, Nikolaus (1974). Oxfordshire. The Buildings of England. Harmondsworth: Penguin Books. p. 820. ISBN 0-14-071045-0.
