= Lark Rise to Candleford =

Trilogy of novels by Flora Thompson

Lark Rise to Candleford: a trilogy
- First edition cover
- Author: Flora Thompson
- Cover artist: Julie Neild
- Language: English
- Genre: Novel
- Publisher: Oxford University Press
- Publication date: 1945
- Publication place: England
- Media type: Print

Lark Rise to Candleford is a trilogy of semi-autobiographical novels by Flora Thompson about the countryside of north-east Oxfordshire and Buckinghamshire, England, at the end of the 19th century. The stories were previously published separately as Lark Rise in 1939, Over to Candleford in 1941 and Candleford Green in 1943. They were first published together in 1945.

The stories relate to three communities: the hamlet of Juniper Hill (Lark Rise), where Flora grew up; Buckingham (Candleford, one of the nearest towns, including aspects of Brackley and Bicester); and the nearby village of Fringford (Candleford Green), where Flora got her first job in the Post Office.

== Critical analysis ==
In 1944, H. J. Massingham saw Thompson's description of the disintegration of "a local self-acting society living by a fixed pattern of behaviour" as an elegiac evocation of what he called "this great tragic epic".

In a 1982 review in The Boston Phoenix, Ariel Swartley described what she felt was "the revelation of Lark Rise to Candleford": "To those who know England best through its novelists, this may be the first time they've heard the 'lower classes' speak for themselves – and salutary it is, too. The fine points of the class system may not be wholly elucidated by reading Thompson, but the tensions will be unmistakable."

According to Richard Mabey in his 2014 book Dreams of the Good Life, Thompson "was a sophisticated and imaginative writer, involved in a more complicated business than straightforward autobiography". The stories are told in the third person by 'Laura' (a version of the author's childhood self) who observes events directly, while the adult author is also present as a second narrator, commenting and reflecting on past events. Mabey comments that the counterpoint between these dual viewpoints "is part of what gives Lark Rise its unique voice".

Mabey noted that as Thompson wrote her account some forty years after the events she described, she was able to identify the period as a pivotal point in rural history: the time when the quiet, close-knit and peaceful rural culture, governed by the seasons, began a transformation, through agricultural mechanisation, better communications and urban expansion, into the homogenised society of today. The transformation is not explicitly described. It appears as allegory, for example in Laura's first visit to Candleford without her parents: the journey from her tiny village to the sophisticated town representing the temporal changes that would affect her whole community. Although the works are autobiographical, Thompson distances herself from her childhood persona by telling the tale in the third person; she appears in the book as "Laura Timmins", rather than her real maiden name of Flora Timms. This device allows Thompson to comment on the action, using the voice of 'Laura' as the child she was and as the adult narrator, without imposing herself into the work.

== Sequel ==
Thompson wrote a sequel, Heatherley, set in Grayshott, Hampshire. The novel described her life working in the post office at the turn of the century, but the period lacked the changing social significance portrayed in her earlier works, and she did not seek to have it published. It appeared posthumously in 1979.

== Plays ==
The television scriptwriter and playwright Keith Dewhurst adapted Thompson's trilogy into two plays, Lark Rise and Candleford, which were performed at the National Theatre in 1978–1979. Dewhurst's concept was to reflect the familiarity, one for another, of the village inhabitants by staging the plays as a promenade, with the theatre seats removed and the actors, musicians and audience intermingling.

Although the books describe village life through the seasons of the year, Dewhurst selected just two days: the first day of harvest for Lark Rise and the first hunt meet of the new year, a winter's day in January, for Candleford. He drew on Thompson's own introductions to set the scene and her reflections on the fates of her characters from a future perspective – a future in which many of the boys just depicted had died in war – as a coda. In Dewhurst's words, his audience was to recognise the "common humanity" linking the nineteenth-century villagers and the contemporary audience.

The joint directors for the two productions were Bill Bryden and Sebastian Graham-Jones. Laura was played by Valerie Whittington. The musical directors John Tams and Ashley Hutchings made use of traditional songs as the basis for the score, performed by the Albion Band.

In the 1978 Olivier Awards Lark Rise was nominated for "Best Play" and "Best Director". "It is a most extraordinary event...It will send most spectators out wiser and happier human beings...one of those rare theatrical occasions with a genuine healing quality", wrote theatre critic Michael Billington of The Guardian.

In October 2005 the plays were revived by the Shapeshifter company at the Finborough Theatre in London, directed by Mike Bartlett and John Terry.

== Television ==
A BBC adaptation, starring Julia Sawalha, Olivia Hallinan, Brendan Coyle and Dawn French, ran on BBC One from 13 January 2008 to 13 February 2011. The series was adapted by Bill Gallagher and directed by Charles Palmer.
