= Flora Thompson =

English novelist and poet (1876–1947)

- Born: Flora Jane Timms; 5 December 1876; Juniper Hill, Oxfordshire, England
- Died: 21 May 1947 (aged 70); Brixham, Devon, England
- Resting place: Longcross Cemetery, Dartmouth, Devon, England; 50.348601°N 3.596723°W
- Employer: Post office
- Known for: Author and poet
- Notable work: Lark Rise to Candleford
- Spouse: John William Thompson
- Children: 3

Flora Jane Thompson (née Timms; 5 December 1876 – 21 May 1947) was an English novelist and poet best known for her semi-autobiographical trilogy about the English countryside, Lark Rise to Candleford.

== Early life and family ==
Thompson was born Flora Jane Timms in Juniper Hill in northeast Oxfordshire, the eldest child of Albert and Emma Timms, a stonemason and nursemaid respectively. Albert and Emma had twelve children, but only six survived childhood. One of her younger sisters was Betty Timms, best known for her children's book The Little Grey Men of the Moor. The young Flora's early education was at the parish school in the village of Cottisford where she was described as 'altogether her father's child'.

In 1891, at the age of 14, Flora moved to take up a position as counter clerk at the post office in Fringford, a village about 4 miles (6.4 km) northeast of Bicester, under the tutelage of the postmistress, Mrs Kezia Whitton. She later served at various other post offices, including offices at Grayshott, Yateley, and Winton in Bournemouth.

In 1903 she married John William Thompson, a post office clerk and telegraphist from the Isle of Wight, at Twickenham Parish Church, after which they moved to Bournemouth where they had a daughter, Winifred Grace (1903), and a son, Henry Basil (1909). In 1916 they moved to Liphook where their second son Peter Redmond was born (1918). Thompson's favourite brother, Edwin, was killed near Ypres in 1916.

== Literary output ==
A self-taught and a largely self-educated writer, Thompson was thinking, as early as 1922, about writing of her childhood. In 1911 she had won an essay competition in The Ladies Companion for a 300-word essay about Jane Austen. Her younger sister, Ethel Elizabeth 'Betty' Timms shared her love of writing, and Betty's success with a children's book, 'The Little Grey Men of the Moor', published in 1926, encouraged Flora to write her books.

She later wrote extensively, publishing short stories and magazine and newspaper articles. She was also a keen self-taught naturalist; many of her nature articles were anthologised in 1986.

In 1938 Thompson sent some essays on her country childhood to Oxford University Press. They were accepted and published in three separate volumes, Lark Rise (1939), Over to Candleford (1941), and Candleford Green (1943). In 1945 the books were republished as a trilogy under the title Lark Rise to Candleford. The trilogy is a lightly disguised story of the author's own youth, describing life in a hamlet, a village, and a country town in the 1880s.

Two of Thompson's later lesser-known works were published posthumously: Heatherley, recounting her time in the post office at Grayshott at the turn of the 20th century when several of her lifelong interests took shape, the longing for education and culture and the desire to become a writer; and her last book Still Glides the Stream.

== Critical reception ==
H. J. Massingham said of Thompson in 1944, "...she possesses the attributes both of sympathetic presentation and literary power to such a degree that her claims can hardly be questioned". Thompson's essays have been said to reveal an impressive knowledge of English literature and a gift for writing intelligent but accessible prose for a general audience. She approached novel writing as an artistic process and her descriptions of nature are notably poetic.

Thompson's biographer, Gillian Lindsay, says, "...this girl whose elementary education was not enough to allow her to take a Civil Service examination, had written a classic book, a piece of enduring literature," while Shuckburgh considers that it was her 'passion and control' that made Thompson such a good writer. Her entry in the ODNB says of the trilogy that "Few works better or more elegantly capture the decay of Victorian agrarian England".

Thompson's trilogy has been widely used as a primary source for the social history of the period, although some historians have expressed reservations as to its validity for that purpose.

== Death ==
The death of Thompson's younger son during the Second World War affected her deeply and overshadowed her final years. She died in 1947 of a heart attack in Brixham, and is buried at Longcross Cemetery, Dartmouth, Devon.

== Bibliography ==
=== Verse ===
- Bog Myrtle and Peat (1921)

=== Novels ===
- Lark Rise (1939)
- Over to Candleford (1941)
- Candleford Green (1943)
- Lark Rise to Candleford (1945, the above three novels published as a trilogy)
- Still Glides the Stream (1948, published posthumously)
- Heatherley (1944, published posthumously first in A Country Calendar 1979 along with some Peverel Papers and some poems; then as single volume in 1998)
- Gates of Eden (serialised in The Peverel Monthly edited by Thompson in the late 1920s but never published as a separate volume)
- Dashpers (unfinished, unpublished novel)

=== Nature articles ===
- The Peverel Papers (Abridged version published 1986; Complete version published 2008)

== Sources ==
- Lindsay, Gillian (2007). Flora Thompson, the story of the 'Lark Rise' writer. Bordon: John Owen Smith. p. 30. ISBN 978-1-873855-53-9.
