= Bluebeard =

French folktale

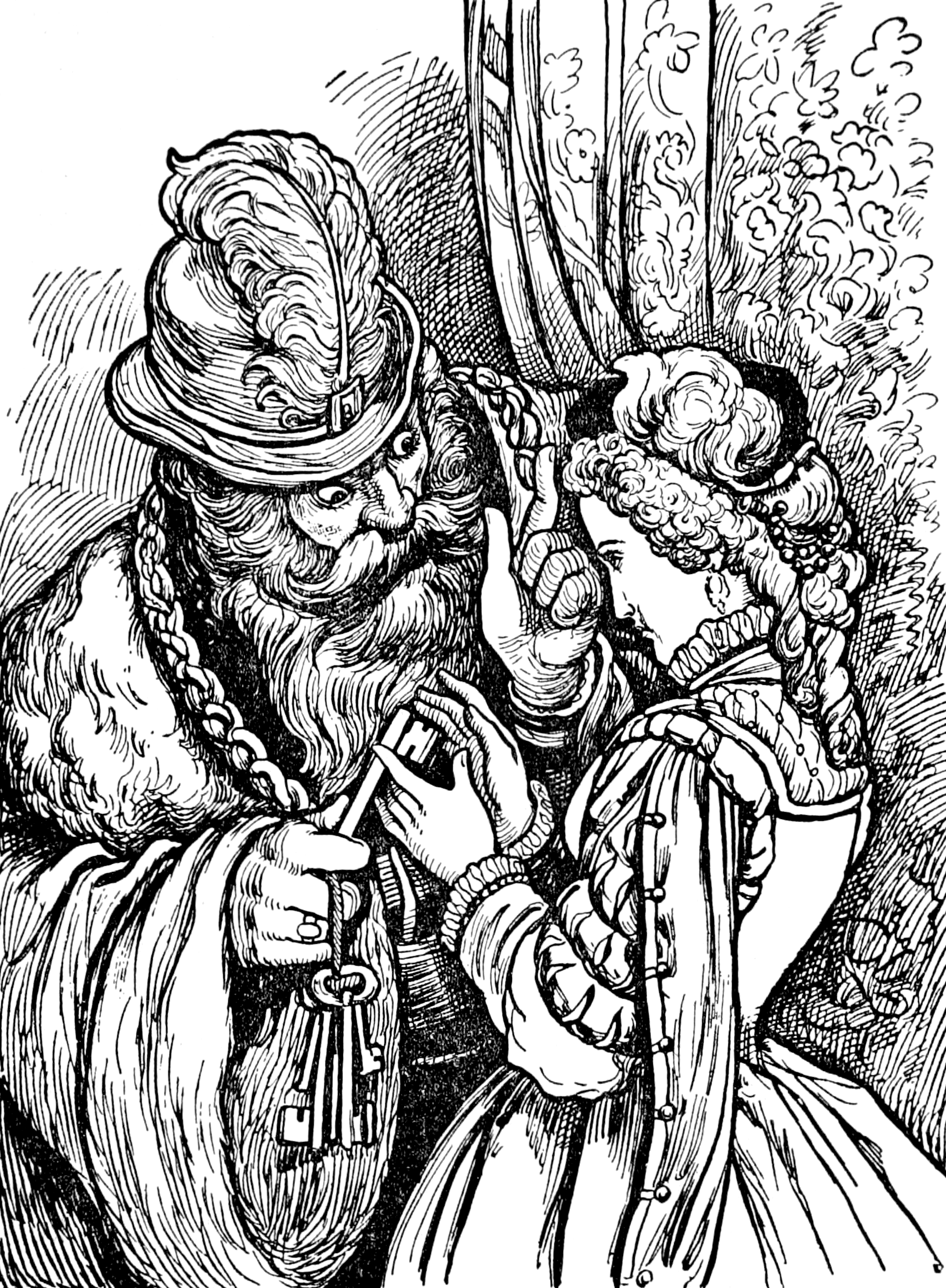
- Bluebeard gives his wife the keys to his castle, art by Gustave Doré (1862).

Folk tale
- Name: Bluebeard
- Also known as: Barbebleue
- Aarne–Thompson grouping: ATU 312 (The Bluebeard, The Maiden-Killer)
- Region: France
- Published in: Histoires ou contes du temps passé, by Charles Perrault
- Related: The Robber Bridegroom; How the Devil Married Three Sisters; Fitcher's Bird

"Bluebeard" (French: Barbe bleue [baʁb(ə) blø]) is a French folktale, the most famous surviving version of which was written by Charles Perrault and first published by Claude Barbin in Paris in 1697 in Histoires ou contes du temps passé. The tale is about a wealthy man in the habit of murdering his wives and the attempts of the present one to avoid the fate of her predecessors. "The White Dove", "The Robber Bridegroom", and "Fitcher's Bird" (also called "Fowler's Fowl") are tales similar to "Bluebeard". The notoriety of the tale is such that Merriam-Webster gives the word Bluebeard the definition of "a man who marries and kills one wife after another". The verb bluebearding has even appeared as a way to describe the crime of either killing a series of women, or seducing and abandoning a series of women.

== Plot ==
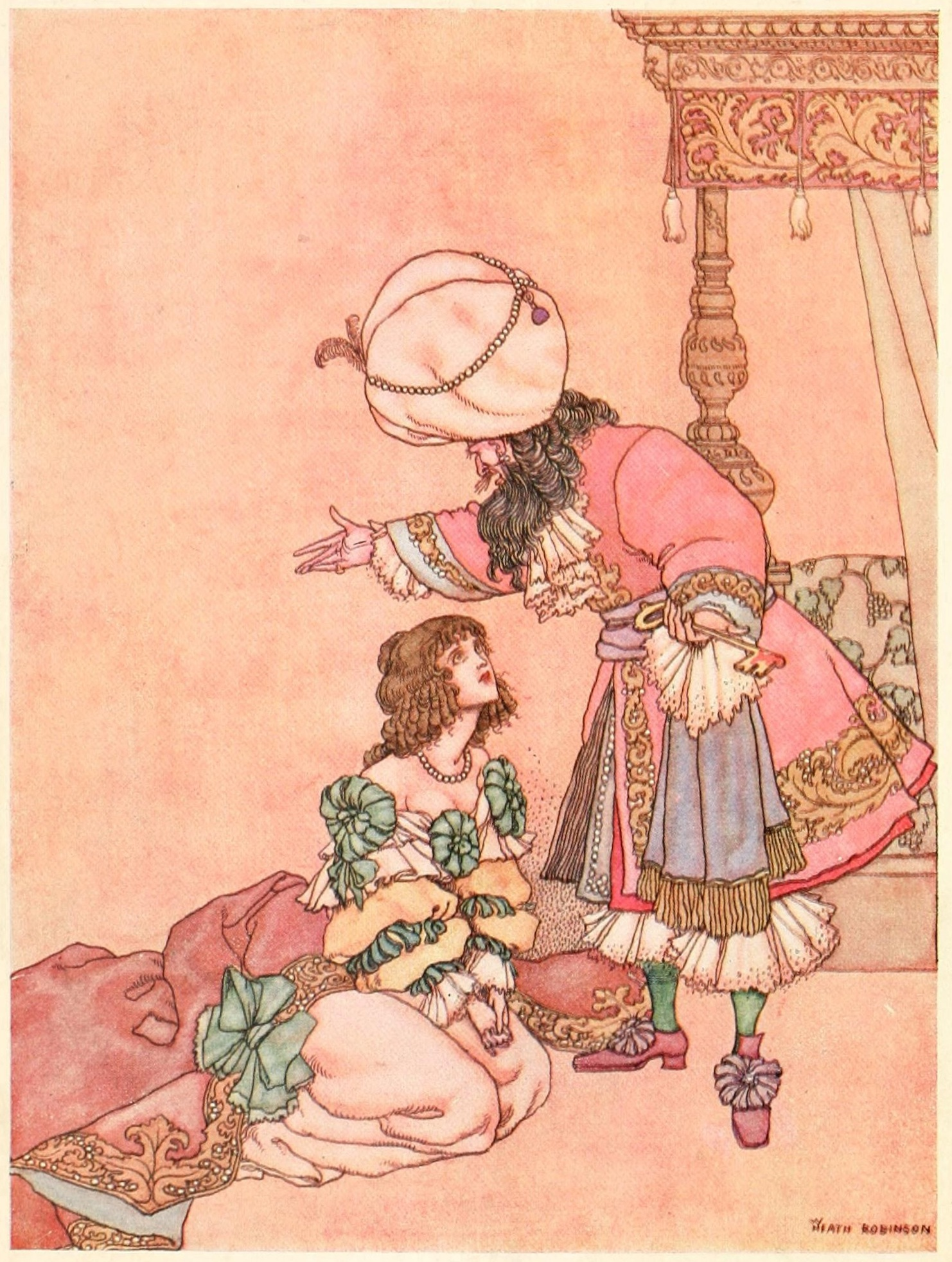
Bluebeard, his wife, and the key in a 1921 illustration by W. Heath Robinson

In one version of the story, Bluebeard is a wealthy and powerful nobleman who has been married six times to beautiful women who have all mysteriously vanished. When he visits his neighbor and asks to marry one of his daughters, they are terrified. After hosting a wonderful banquet, the youngest decides to be his wife and goes to live with him in his rich and luxurious palace in the countryside, away from her family.

Bluebeard announces that he must leave for the country and gives the palace keys to his wife. She is able to open any room with them, each of which contains some of his riches, except for an underground chamber that he strictly forbids her to enter lest she suffer his wrath. He then goes away, leaving the palace and the keys in her hands. She invites her sister, Anne, and her friends and cousins over for a party. However, she is eventually overcome with the desire to see what the secret room holds, and she sneaks away from the party and ventures into it.

She immediately discovers that the room is flooded with blood and the murdered corpses of Bluebeard's previous six wives hanging on hooks from the walls. Horrified, she drops the key in the blood and flees the room. She tries to wipe the blood stain off the key, but the key is magic and the stain cannot be removed from it.

Bluebeard unexpectedly returns and finds the bloody key. In a blind rage, he threatens to kill his wife on the spot, but she asks for one last prayer with Anne. Then, as Bluebeard is about to deliver the fatal blow, Anne and her brothers arrive and kill him. The wife inherits his fortune and castle, and has his six dead wives laid to rest. She uses the fortune to have her siblings married then remarries herself, finally moving on from the horror of her time with Bluebeard.

== Sources ==
Although best known as a folktale, the character of Bluebeard may have originated in legends related to historical figures from Brittany, according to some researchers.

Gilles de Rais, a 15th-century nobleman who fought alongside Joan of Arc and became Marshal of France, was hanged and burned for multiple murders and heresy. He did not kill his wife, and the crimes for which he was convicted involved the sexually driven, brutal murder of children rather than women. It has nevertheless been suggested that Gilles de Rais may have inspired Charles Perrault's literary folktale in the late 17th century. However, there is no evidence that Perrault was familiar with Gilles de Rais's life, nor that it had a decisive influence on the writing of "Bluebeard". A popular confusion between the mythical Bluebeard and the historical Baron de Rais has been documented since the early 19th century.

Another possible source stems from the story of the early Breton king Conomor the Accursed and his wife Tryphine. This is recorded in a biography of St. Gildas, written five centuries after his death in the sixth century. It describes how after Conomor married Tryphine, she was warned by the ghosts of his previous wives that he murders them when they become pregnant. Pregnant, she flees; he catches and beheads her, but St. Gildas miraculously restores her to life, and when he brings her to Conomor, the walls of his castle collapse and kill him. Conomor is a historical figure, known locally as a werewolf, and various local churches are dedicated to Saint Tryphine and her son, Saint Tremeur.

== Commentaries ==
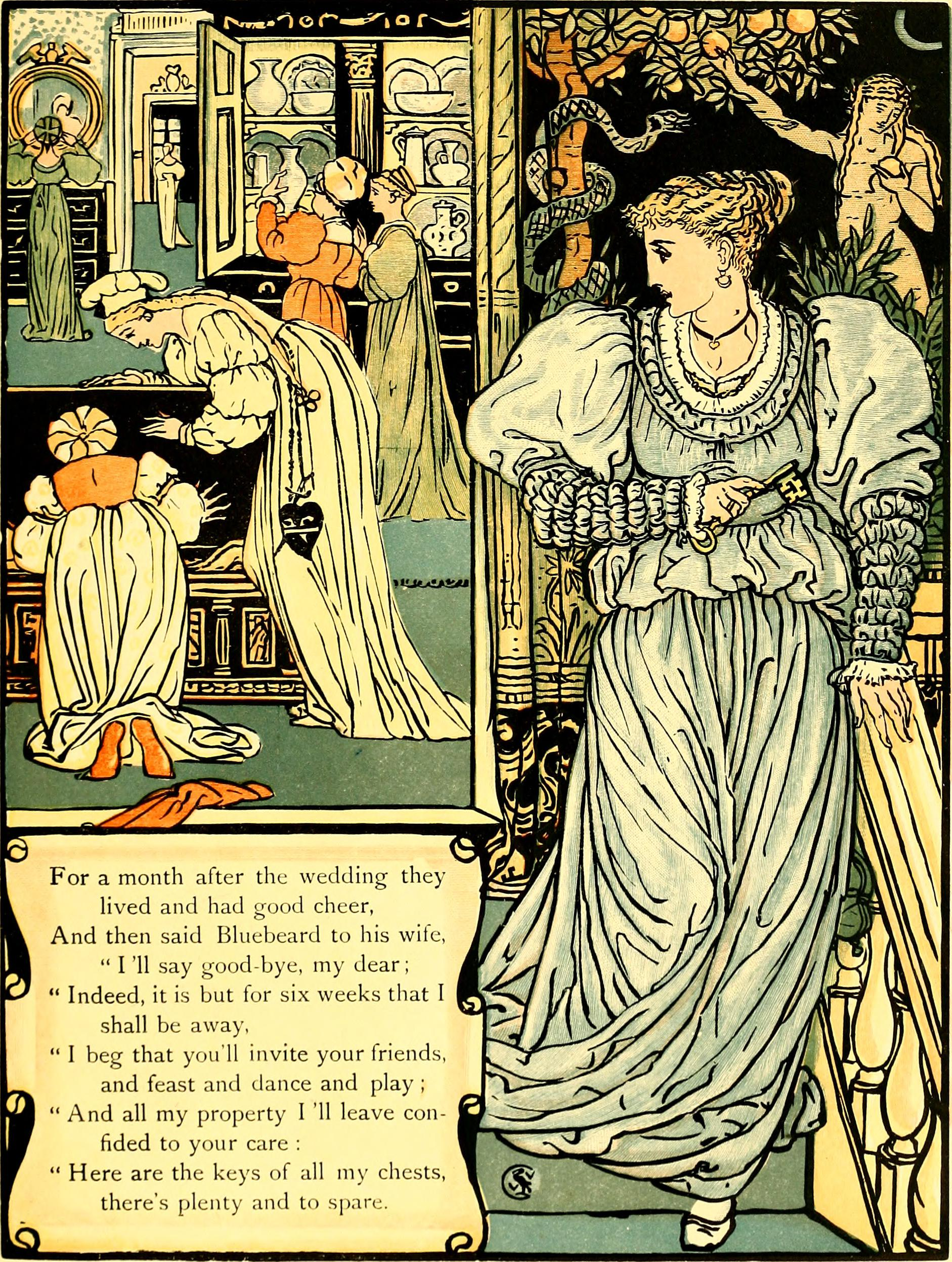
The Wife is given the keys of the house. Illustration by Walter Crane

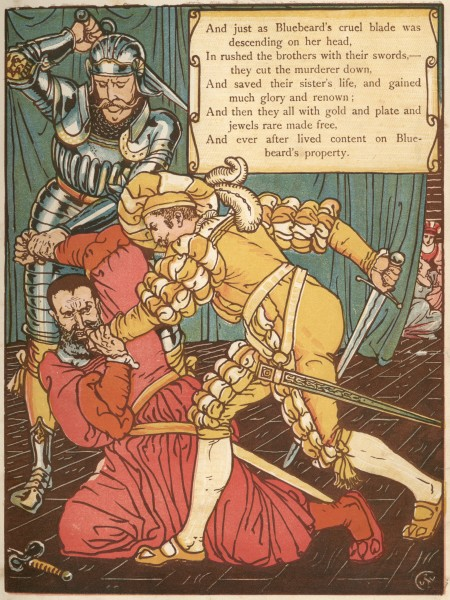
Bluebeard is slain in a woodcut by Walter Crane

The fatal effects of female curiosity have long been the subject of story and legend. Pandora and Psyche are examples of women in mythic stories whose curiosity has dire consequences. In giving his wife the keys to his castle, Bluebeard is acting the part of the Serpent of Eden, and therefore of the devil, and his wife the part of the victim held by the serpent's gaze.

While some scholars interpret the Bluebeard story as a fable preaching obedience to wives (as Perrault's moral suggests), folklorist Maria Tatar has suggested that the tale encourages women not to unquestioningly follow patriarchal rules. Women breaking men's rules in the fairy-tale can be seen as a metaphor for women breaking society's rules and being punished for their transgression. The key can be seen as a sign of disobedience or transgression; it can also be seen as a sign that one should not trust their husband.

Tatar, however, does go on to speak of Bluebeard as something of a "Beauty and the Beast" narrative. The original Beauty and the Beast tale by Jeanne-Marie Leprince de Beaumont is said to be a story created to condition young women into the possibility of not only marriage, but marrying young, and to placate their fears of the implications of an older husband. It shows the beast as secretly compassionate, and someone meant to curb the intense sexual fear that young women have of marriage. Though "Beauty and the Beast" holds several similarities in Gothic imagery to "Bluebeard" (such as is shared with Cupid and Psyche as well, in the case of a mysterious captor, a looming castle, and a young, beautiful heroine), Tatar goes on to state that the latter tale lives on the entire opposite side of the spectrum: one in which, instead of female placation, the tale simply aggravates women's apprehension, confirming one's "worst fears about sex".

Jungian psychoanalyst Clarissa Pinkola Estés in Women Who Run with the Wolves refers to the key as "the key of knowing" which gives the wife consciousness. She can choose not to open the door and live as a naive young woman. Instead, she has chosen to open the door of truth.

For psychologist Bruno Bettelheim, Bluebeard can only be considered a fairy-tale because of the magical bleeding key; otherwise, it would just be a monstrous horror story. Bettelheim sees the key as associated with the male sexual organ, "particularly the first intercourse when the hymen is broken and blood gets on it". For Bettelheim, the blood on the key is a symbol of the wife's indiscretion.

For scholar Philip Lewis, the key offered to the wife by Bluebeard represents his superiority, since he knows something she does not. The blood on the key indicates that she now has knowledge. She has erased the difference between them, and in order to return her to her previous state, he must kill her.

== Aarne–Thompson classification ==
According to the Aarne–Thompson system of classifying folktale plots, the tale of Bluebeard is type 312. Another such tale is The White Dove, an oral French variant. The type is closely related to Aarne–Thompson type 311 in which the heroine rescues herself and her sisters, in such tales as Fitcher's Bird, The Old Dame and Her Hen, and How the Devil Married Three Sisters. The tales where the youngest daughter rescues herself and the other sisters from the villain are in fact far more common in oral traditions than this type, where the heroine's brother rescues her. Other such tales do exist, however; the brother is sometimes aided in the rescue by marvelous dogs or wild animals.

Some European variants of the ballad Lady Isabel and the Elf Knight, Child ballad 4, closely resemble this tale. This is particularly noteworthy among some German variants, where the heroine calls for help much like Sister Anne calls for help to her brothers in Perrault's Bluebeard.

== Bluebeard's wives ==
It is not explained why Bluebeard murdered his first bride; she could not have entered the forbidden room and found a dead wife. Some scholars have theorized that he was testing his wife's obedience, and that she was killed not for what she discovered there, but because she disobeyed his orders.

In the 1812 version published in Grimm's Fairy-Tales, Wilhelm Grimm, on p. XLI of the annotations, makes the following handwritten comment: "It seems in all Märchen [fairy-tales] of Bluebeard, wherein his Blutrunst [lust for blood] has not rightly explained, the idea to be the basis of himself through bathing in blood to cure of the blue beard; as the lepers. That is also why it is written that the blood is collected in basins."

Maurice Maeterlinck wrote extensively on Bluebeard and his plays name at least six former wives: Sélysette from Aglavaine et Sélysette (1896), Alladine from Alladine et Palomides (1894), both Ygraine and Bellangère from La mort de Tintagiles (1894), Mélisande from Pelléas et Mélisande, and Ariane from Ariane et Barbe-bleue (1907).

In Jacques Offenbach's opera Barbe-bleue (1866), the five previous wives are Héloïse, Eléonore, Isaure, Rosalinde and Blanche, with the sixth and final wife being a peasant girl, Boulotte, who finally reveals his secret when he attempts to have her killed so that he can marry Princess Hermia.

Béla Bartók's opera Bluebeard's Castle (1911), with a libretto by Béla Balázs, names "Judith" as wife number four.

Anatole France's short story "The Seven Wives of Bluebeard" names Jeanne de Lespoisse as the last wife before Bluebeard's death. The other wives were Collette Passage, Jeanne de la Cloche, Gigonne, Blanche de Gibeaumex, Angèle de la Garandine, and Alix de Pontalcin.

In Edward Dmytryk's film Bluebeard (1972), Baron von Sepper (Richard J. Burton) is an Austrian aristocrat known as Bluebeard for his blue-toned beard and his appetite for beautiful wives, and his wife is an American named Anne.

In Alex Garland's film Ex Machina (2014), Nathan is an internet mogul who designs robots with humanoid female bodies inside his home. Each time he starts a new iteration of the robot, he eliminates the AI of the previous one and puts the robot body inside a cupboard in his vault. Nathan's company is called Blue Book and a key plays a central role in the movie.

== "Bluebeard" and Orientalism in illustration and text ==
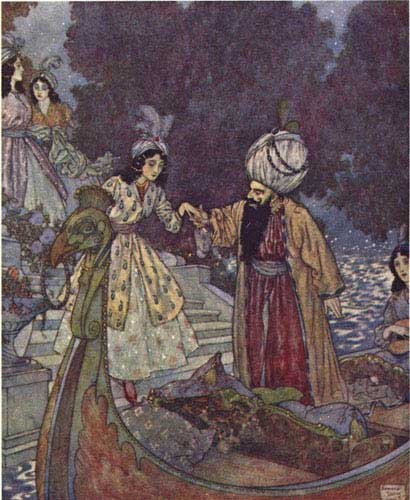
Edmund Dulac illustration, 1910

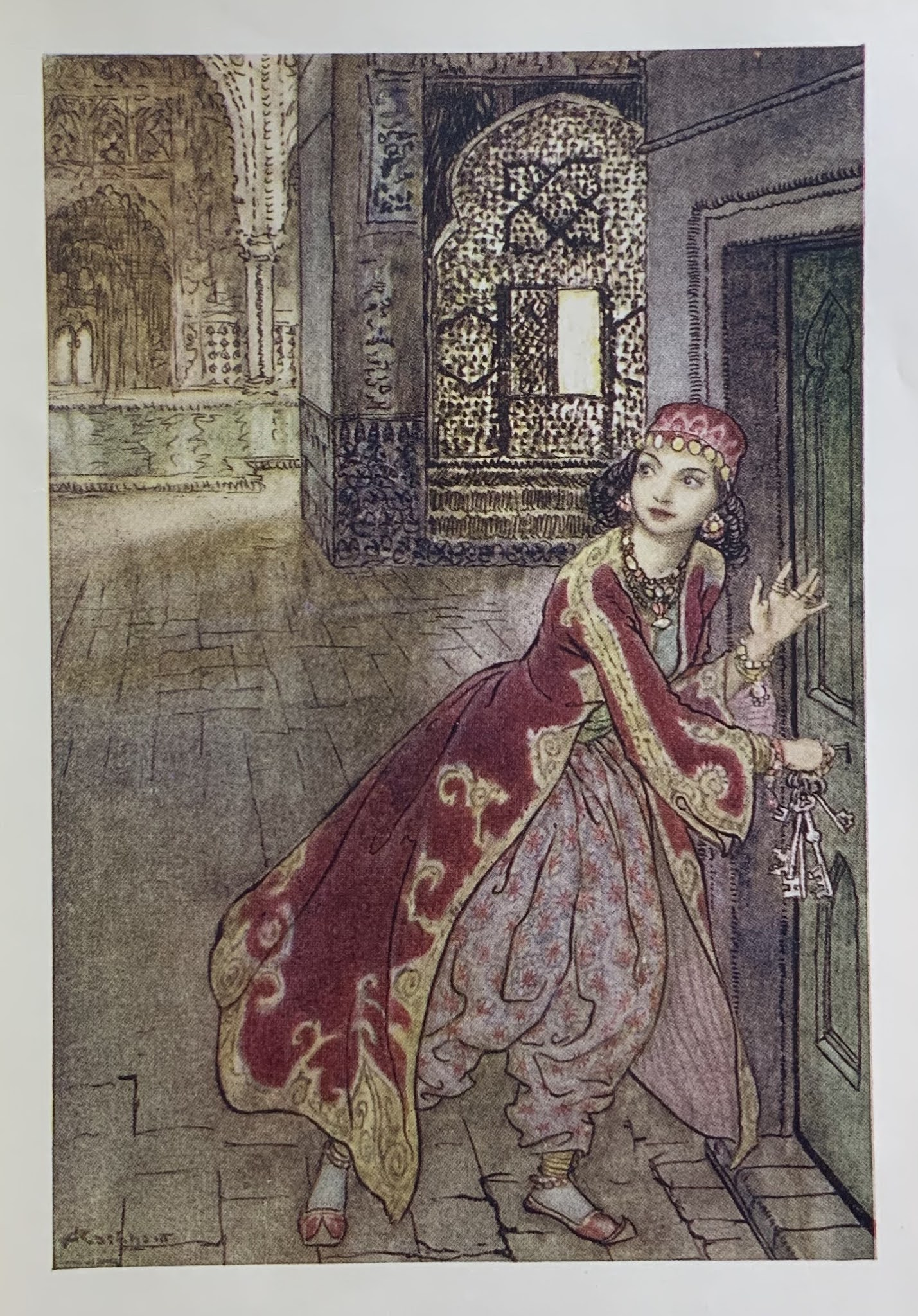
Arthur Rackham illustration, 1933

Several scholars have noted the presence of Orientalism in illustrations of the tale, particularly those from the late 19th and early 20th centuries, although the trend has been dated as far back as 1805. Artists such as Arthur Rackham, Edmund Dulac, Harry Clarke, Jennie Harbour, and others portrayed Bluebeard with an Oriental appearance, wearing clothing such as a turban, a vibrantly colored silk robe, and pointed slippers, carrying a scimitar. These motifs often extended to depictions of his castle (which has been likened to "a harem") and the attire of the wife, who usually retained her "European features". Dulac in particular was known for incorporating such themes into his work, and his lavish illustrations of the tale are often cited as prime examples of the trend, with Anna Guiterrez calling them "[an] Oriental [fantasy]". Dulac also notably illustrated a version of "Beauty and the Beast" with similar overtones.

Folklorist Maria Tatar has claimed the popularity of Sir Richard Francis Burton's 1888 ten-volume translation of the Middle eastern story collection One Thousand and One Nights influenced such depictions, with Victorian and Edwardian artists perhaps seeing a link between Bluebeard and the frame story's Persian king Shahryār, who similarly had a succession of wives whom he killed before the current one, when the story begins. Another recognized influence is the 1798 opera The Grand Dramatic Romance Blue-Beard, or Female Curiosity by George Colman the Younger, composed by Michael Kelly. Pantomime versions of the tale were staged at the Theatre Royal, Drury Lane in London as early as 1798, and continued until at least 1901. Often, these productions set the story in the Ottoman Empire or Persia with elaborate Eastern-inspired costumes and sets. On a psychological level, Marina Warner has noted the similarities between the French words for "beard" and "barbarian" (barbe and barbare, respectively), which she theorized lead to artists such as Rackham portraying the king as "a Turk in pantaloons and turban, who rides an elephant, and grasps his wife by the hair when he prepares to behead her with his scimitar."

Tatar further theorized in a later article that the apparent mismatch between Orientalist illustrations and the story's European origin stemmed from the violent plot clashing with the prim morals of society at the time, writing "After all, it's much more comforting for the French reader to think of such marital discord and violence as having taken place long ago and far away, rather than at home in today's France." Kelly Faircloth also noted this discrepancy, citing the illustrations as "pushing the whole disquieting tale into the geographic and cultural distance".

Less commonly, Orientalist themes could extended to the text itself, with rewrites moving the setting from the French countryside to a Middle Eastern city such as Baghdad and giving the wife the Arabic name "Fatima", though Bluebeard and the wife's sister Anne often contradictorily retained their European names. New retellings of the story contained Orientalist themes as late as 1933.

Though criticism of this phenomenon did not widely come about until the 21st century, an early detractor was Scottish folklorist Andrew Lang, selector and editor of the popular children's series Lang's Fairy Books. Lang was displeased with the Orientalist themes in then-current illustration, seeing it as a deliberate masking of the story's European origins, and commented in the introduction to the first volume of the series, 1889's The Blue Fairy Book: "Monsieur de la Barbe Bleue was not a Turk!...They were all French folk and Christians; had he been a Turk, Blue Beard need not have wedded to but one wife at a time." Despite Lang's grievances, the illustrations for the tale in the volume by G.P. Jacomb-Hood portray Bluebeard, his wife, and the castle with a Middle Eastern motif.

Orientalist themes gradually disappeared from retellings in the latter half of the 20th century and beyond, which were increasingly aimed at recontextualizing the morals and themes of the tale (such as Angela Carter's 1979 short story "The Bloody Chamber", which explicitly sets the tale back in its native France).

== Real life accounts ==
Henri Désiré Landru was a French serial killer during the First World War and nicknamed the "Bluebeard of Gambais". His story was lampooned in the Charlie Chaplin black comedy film Monsieur Verdoux (1947). An eponymous dramatic film, Landru, was released in France in 1963.

== Variants ==
- "Bluebeard", a fairy-tale (KHM 62a, dropped from later editions) collected by The Brothers Grimm in Kinder- und Hausmärchen (KHM) (1812)
  - "The Robber Bridegroom", a variant (KHM 40) in Grimms' Fairy Tales (1812)
  - "Fitcher's Bird", another variant (KHM 48) in Grimms' Fairy Tales (1812)
  - "The Castle of Murder" (KHM 73a, dropped from later editions), another variant in Grimms' Fairy Tales (1812)
- "Mr. Fox", an English variant of Bluebeard
- "The White Dove", a French variant of Bluebeard

== Versions and reworkings ==
=== Literature ===
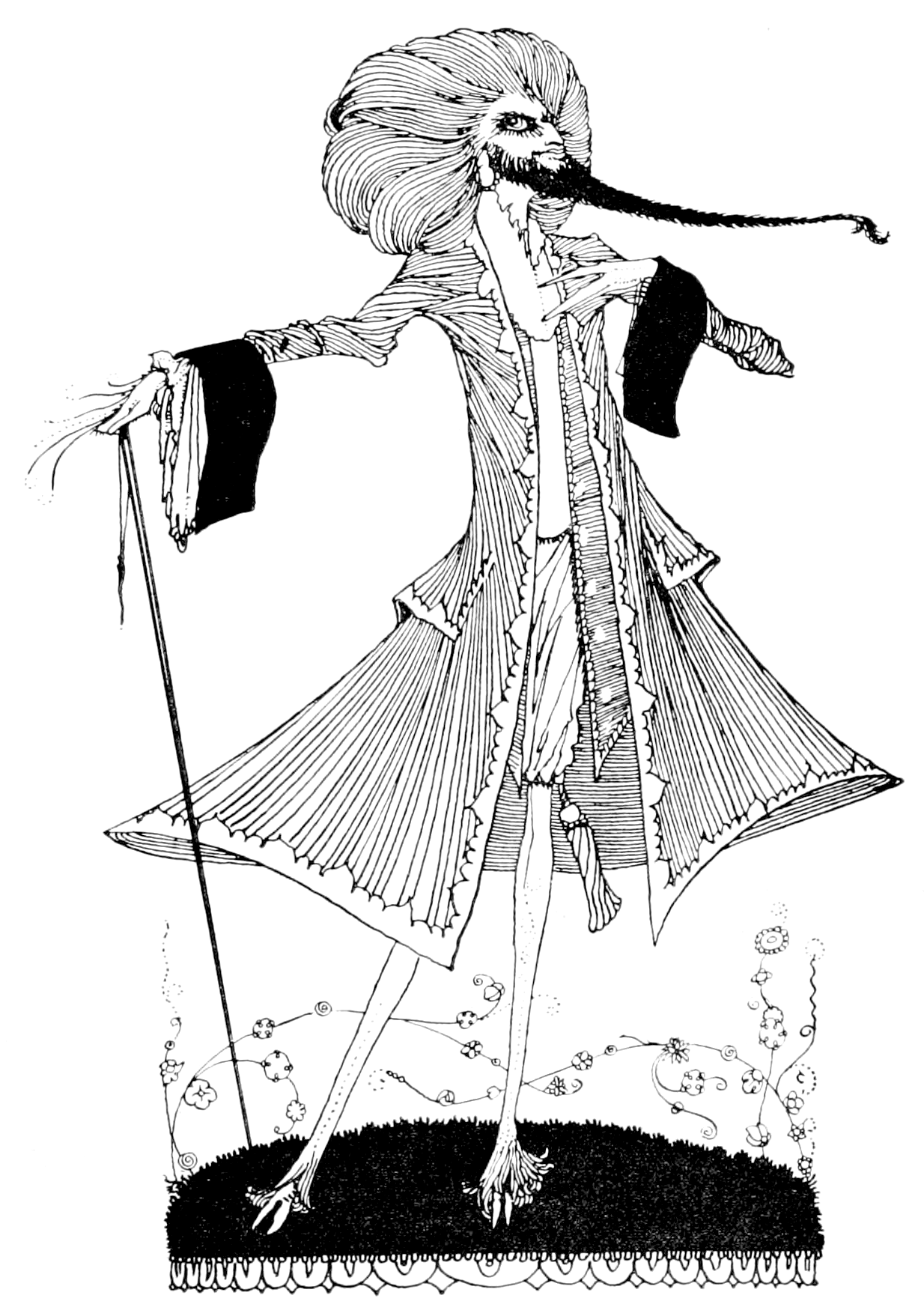
"Blue Beard" by Harry Clarke.

Other versions of Bluebeard include:

- "The Bloody Chamber" (1979), a short story by Angela Carter
- Bluebeard (1982), a novel by Max Frisch
- "Bluebeard's Egg" (1983), a short story by Margaret Atwood in a collection of the same name
- Bluebeard (1987), a novel by Kurt Vonnegut
- "Blue-Bearded Lover" (1987), a short story by Joyce Carol Oates
- Blaubarts Schatten ("Bluebeard's Shadow") (1991), a novel by Karin Struck
- "Bluebeard in Ireland"' (1994), a short story by John Updike
- Fitcher's Brides (2002), a novel by Gregory Frost
- Barbe Bleue (2012), a novel by Amélie Nothomb.
- The Seventh Bride (2014), a novel by Ursula Vernon under the pen name T. Kingfisher
- How to be Eaten (2022), a novel by Maria Adelmann
- Bluebeard's Castle (2023), a novel by filmmaker Anna Biller.
- The House Saphir (2025), a fantasy retelling by Marissa Meyer.

In Charles Dickens' short story "Captain Murderer" (1860), the title character is described as "an offshoot of the Bluebeard family". The twist of this story is that he cannibalises each wife shortly after marriage, baking her flesh in a huge meat pie. He meets his demise after his sister-in-law, in revenge for the death of her sister (his next-to-last wife), marries him and consumes a deadly poison just before he kills and eats her.

In Anatole France's The Seven Wives of Bluebeard, Bluebeard is the victim of the tale, and his wives the perpetrators. Bluebeard is a generous, kind-hearted, wealthy nobleman called Bertrand de Montragoux who marries a succession of grotesque, adulterous, difficult, or simple-minded wives. His first six wives all die, flee, or are sent away under unfortunate circumstances, none of which are his fault. His seventh wife deceives him with another lover and murders him for his wealth.

In Angela Carter's "The Bloody Chamber", Bluebeard is a 1920s decadent with a collection of erotic drawings, and Bluebeard's wife is rescued by her mother, who rides in on a horse and shoots Bluebeard between the eyes, rather than by her brothers as in the original fairy-tale.

In Joyce Carol Oates' short story, "Blue-Bearded Lover", the most recent wife is well aware of Bluebeard's murdered wives: she does not unlock the door to the forbidden room, and therefore avoids death herself. She remains with Bluebeard despite knowing he is a murderer, and gives birth to Bluebeard's children. The book has been interpreted as a feminist struggle for sexual power.

In Helen Oyeyemi's Mr. Fox, Mr. Fox is a writer of slasher novels, with a muse named Mary. Mary questions Mr. Fox about why he writes about killing women who have transgressed patriarchal laws, making him aware of how his words normalize domestic violence. One of the stories in the book is about a girl named Mary who has a fear of serial killers because her father raised her on stories about men who killed women who did not obey them and then killed her mother.

Kurt Vonnegut's Bluebeard features a painter who calls himself Bluebeard, and who considers his art studio to be a forbidden chamber where his girlfriend Circe Berman is not allowed to go.

In Donald Barthelme's Bluebeard, the wife believes that the carcasses of Bluebeard's previous six wives are behind the door. She loses the key and her lover hides the three duplicates. One afternoon Bluebeard insists that she open the door, so she borrows his key. Inside, she finds the decaying carcasses of six zebras dressed in Coco Chanel gowns.

=== In theatre ===
- Ritter Blaubart ("Knight Bluebeard") (1797), a play by Ludwig Tieck
- Bluebeard (1895), a ballet by Georges Jacobi, choreographed by Carlo Coppi
- Bluebeard (1896), a ballet by choreographer Marius Petipa to the music of composer Pyotr Schenk.
- Ariane et Barbe-bleue (1899), a symbolist play by Maurice Maeterlinck
- Bluebeard's Eighth Wife (1921), a French farce by Alfred Savoir
- Saint Joan (1923), a play by George Bernard Shaw, features Gilles de Rais, nicknamed Bluebeard for his tinted beard and believed by some to be a source of the legend
- Bluebeard (1941), by Jacques Offenbach, choreographed by Michel Fokine
- Blaubarts Traum (Bluebeard's Dream) (1961), a ballet by Harold Saeverud, choreographed by Yvonne Georgi
- Bluebeard (1970), an off-Broadway absurdist comedy by Charles Ludlam, adapted from The Island of Dr Moreau
- Blaubart: Drama giocoso (1985), a play by Martin Mosebach
- Bluebeard (2015), a ballet based on the novel The Seven Wives of Bluebeard by Anatole France, directed and choreographed by Staša Zurovac and composed by Marjan Nećak
- Bluebeard's Friends (2019), one of three short plays by Caryl Churchill
- Blue Beard (2024), a play by Emma Rice

=== In music ===
- Raoul Barbe-bleue (1789), an opera by André Grétry
- The Grand Dramatic Romance Blue-Beard, or Female Curiosity, a 1798 opera by George Colman the Younger, composed by Michael Kelly.
- Barbe-bleue (1866), an operetta by Jacques Offenbach
- Blue Beard, Jr. (1889), musical with a libretto by Clay M. Greene and music by Fred J. Eustis, Richard Maddern, and John Joseph Braham Sr.
- Bluebeard (1901), comedic musical by J. Hickory Wood and Arthur Collins. A 1903 American production, under the title Mr. Blue Beard, is known for being performed during the Iroquois Theatre fire.
- Ariane et Barbe-bleue (1907), an opera by Paul Dukas
- Bluebeard's Castle (1918), an opera by Béla Bartók and Béla Balázs
- "Bluebeard" (1993), a song by the Cocteau Twins, on the album Four-Calendar Café
- "Go Long" by Joanna Newsom (2010), on the album Have One on Me
- "Aoki Hakushaku no Shiro" ("The Blue Marquis' Castle"), a song by Sound Horizon, on the album Märchen
- "Mrs. Bluebeard", a song by They Might Be Giants, on the album I Like Fun
- "Bluebeard" (2019) a song by Patty Griffin, on the album Patty Griffin
- "Nightmares by the Sea", a song by Jeff Buckley on the album Sketches for My Sweetheart the Drunk
- "Eve, Psyche & the Bluebeard's Wife" (2023), a song by Le Sserafim, on the album Unforgiven
- "Predator", a song by Toni Childs from her album The Woman's Boat (2025)
- "Bluebeard’s Chamber", a song by Blackbriar from the album A Thousand Little Deaths (2025)

=== In film ===
Barbe-bleue (1901), directed by Georges Méliès

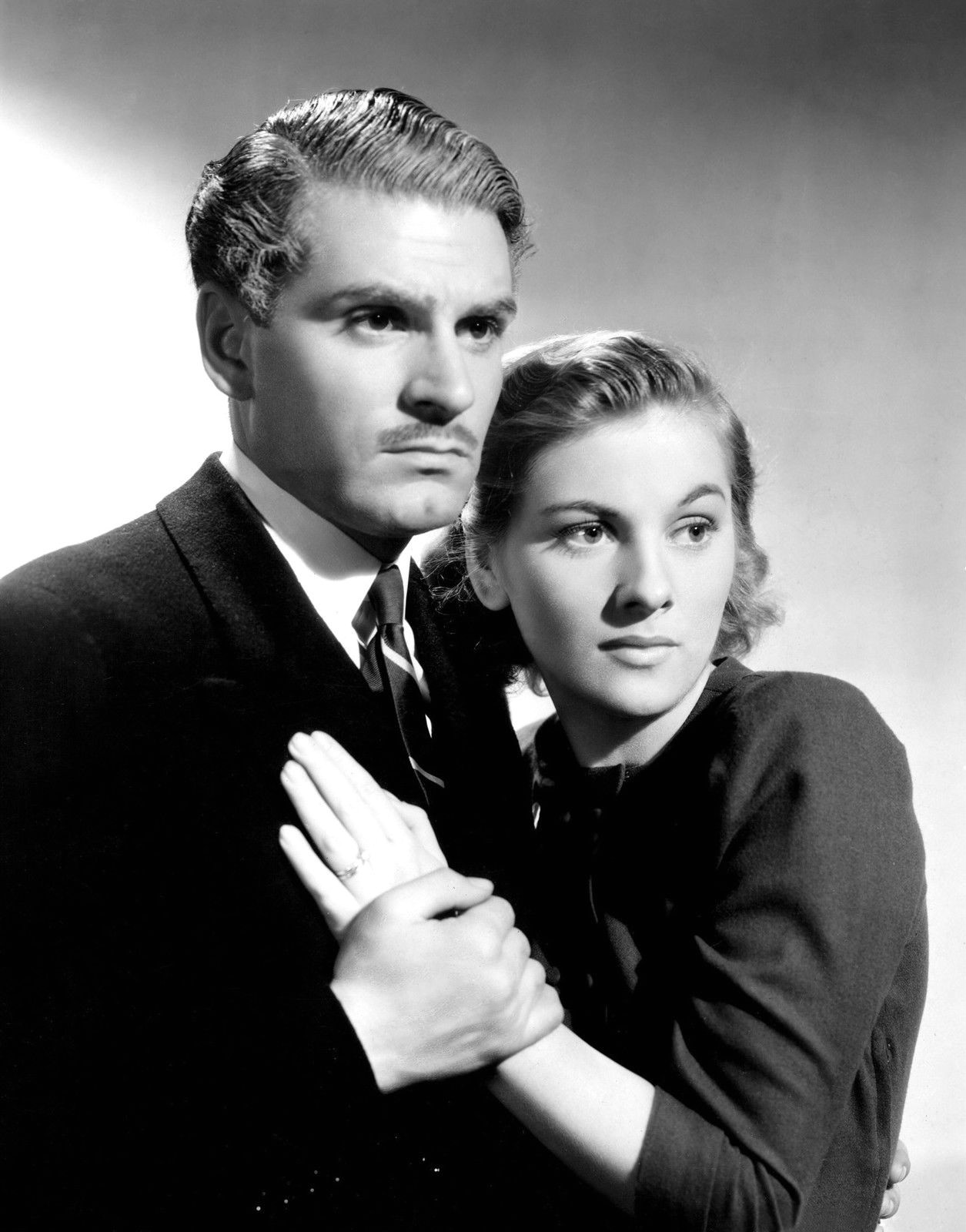
Laurence Olivier and Joan Fontaine in Rebecca (1940)

- Barbe-bleue, a 1901 short film by Georges Méliès
- Bluebeard's 8th Wife, a 1923 silent comedy film directed by Sam Wood and starring Gloria Swanson
- Miss Bluebeard, a 1925 silent comedy film directed by Frank Tuttle and starring Bebe Daniels, based on the play Little Miss Bluebeard
- Barbe-bleue, a 1936 claymation short film directed by Jean Painlevé
- Bluebeard's Eighth Wife, a 1938 remake of the Swanson silent film, directed by Ernst Lubitsch and starring Claudette Colbert and Gary Cooper
- Bluebeard, a 1944 film directed by Edgar G. Ulmer, starring John Carradine
- Gaslight, Rebecca, and Suspicion are classical Hollywood cinema variations on the Bluebeard tale.
- Monsieur Verdoux, a 1947 black comedy film directed by and starring Charles Chaplin
- Secret Beyond the Door, a 1948 contemporary adaptation directed by Fritz Lang, starring Michael Redgrave and Joan Bennett
- Bye, Bye Bluebeard a 1949 Warner Brothers cartoon by Arthur Davis
- Bluebeard's Six Wives, a 1950 Italian comedy film directed by Carlo Ludovico Bragaglia, starring Totò
- Barbe-Bleue (titled Bluebeard in the U.S.), a 1951 German-French film directed by Christian-Jaque, starring Hans Albers
- Juliette, or Key of Dreams, a 1951 French film based on the 1930 play of the same name
- Bluebeard's Ten Honeymoons, a 1960 British thriller directed by W. Lee Wilder and starring George Sanders
- Landru (titled Bluebeard in the U.S.), a 1963 French drama directed by Claude Chabrol starring Charles Denner, Michèle Morgan, and Danielle Darrieux
- Herzog Blaubarts Burg ("Duke Bluebeard's Castle"), a 1963 film directed by Michael Powell
- Bluebeard, a 1972 film directed by Edward Dmytryk, starring Richard J. Burton, Joey Heatherton, Raquel Welch, and Virna Lisi
- Очень синяя борода [Ochen' siniya boroda] (Very Blue Beard), a 1979 Soviet animated film
- La Barbe-bleue, a 1986 French TV movie adaptation directed by Alain Ferrari
- The Piano, a 1993 film directed by Jane Campion
- Barbe Bleue, a 2009 film directed by Catherine Breillat
- Ex Machina, a 2015 film directed by Alex Garland
- Crimson Peak, a 2015 Gothic horror film
- Elizabeth Harvest, a 2018 film directed by Sebastian Gutierrez

=== In poetry ===
- "Bluebeard's Closet" (1888), a poem by Rose Terry Cooke
- "Der Ritter Blaubart" ("The Knight Bluebeard") (1911), a poem by Reinhard Koester
- "I Seek Another Place" (1917), a sonnet by Edna St. Vincent Millay
- "Bluebeard", a poem by Sylvia Plath
- The story is alluded to in Seamus Heaney's 1966 poem "Blackberry Picking": "Our hands were peppered/With thorn pricks, our palms sticky as Bluebeard's."

=== References in literature ===
- In Charlotte Brontë's 1847 novel Jane Eyre, the narrator describes a hallway in her employer's mansion as "like a corridor in some Bluebeard's castle."
- In The Scarlet Pimpernel by Baroness Orczy, the story of Bluebeard is referred to in Chapter 18, with Sir Percy's bedroom being compared to Bluebeard's chamber, and Marguerite to Bluebeard's wife.
- In William Shakespeare's Much Ado About Nothing, the character Benedick exclaims, "Like the old tale, my lord: It is not so nor 'twas not so but, indeed, God forbid it should be so." Here, Benedick is quoting a phrase from an English variant of Bluebeard, Mr. Fox, referring to it as "the old tale".
- In Machado de Assis's story "The Looking Glass" the main character, Jacobina, dreams she is trying to escape Bluebeard.
- In The Blue Castle, a 1926 novel by Lucy Maude Montgomery, Valancy's mysterious new husband forbids her to open one door in his house, a room they both term "Bluebeard's Chamber".
- In Vladimir Nabokov's novel Ada or Ardor: A Family Chronicle, the main character Van and his father Demon are both referred to as Bluebeards.
- In Stephen King's The Shining, the character Jack Torrance reads the story of Bluebeard to his three-year-old son Danny, to his wife's disapproval. The Shining also directly references the Bluebeard tale in that there is a secret hotel room which conceals a suicide, a remote 'castle' (The Overlook Hotel), and a husband (Jack) who attempts to kill his wife.
- In Javier Marías' 1992 novel, A Heart So White, the narrator's father is called "worse than Bluebeard" for having lost three wives in succession.
- In Fifty Shades of Grey, by E. L. James, Mr. Grey has a bloody S & M chamber where he tortures Anastasia, and she refers to him at least once as Bluebeard.
- "Bones", a short story by Francesca Lia Block, recasts Bluebeard as a sinister L.A. promoter.
- The short story Trenzas (Braids) by Chilean writer María Luisa Bombal contains references to Bluebeard.
- In Carmen Maria Machado's In the Dream House, the author uses the story of Bluebeard to illustrate tolerance in domestic abuse situations.

=== In television ===
- Bluebeard was the subject of the pilot episode of an aborted television series, Famous Tales (1951), created by and starring Burl Ives with music by Albert Hague.
- A 1976 episode of Manga Sekai Mukashi Banashi titled in Japanese "Aohige" depicts the Bluebeard fairytale.
- "Bluebeard" is the title and subject of the 16th episode of the Japanese TV series Grimm's Fairy Tale Classics (1988), as part of its "Grimm Masterpiece Theater" season. The character design for Bluebeard strongly resembles the English King Henry VIII.
- Bluebeard is featured in Sandra the Fairytale Detective (2009) as the villain in the episode "The Forbidden Room".
- Bluebeard is featured in Scary Tales, episode 1 (2011), produced by the Discovery Channel, Sony and IMAX. (This series is not related to the Disney collection of the same name.)
- In the TV series Grimm, season 1, episode 4, "Lonely Hearts" (2011), the antagonist is based on Bluebeard.
- In Hannibal, season 3, episode 12, "The Number of the Beast is 666" (2015), Bedelia Du Maurier compares the antagonist Hannibal Lecter to Bluebeard and herself to one of Bluebeard's brides.
- In the South Korean television show Strong Woman Do Bong-soon (2017), a Korean stage play of the Bluebeard story serves as the backstory and inspiration for the antagonist.
- In You, season 1, episode 10, "Bluebeard's Castle" (2018), the heroine Guinevere Beck compares the character Joe Goldberg to Bluebeard and his glass box to Bluebeard's castle.
- In Succession, season 2, episode 9 (2019), Rhea calls Logan "Bluebeard" because she thinks he is trying to kill her.
- In It's Okay to Not Be Okay (2020), a South Korean drama, the tale of Bluebeard is narrated in episode 6, "Bluebeard's Secret".

=== In other media ===
- The fairy-tale of Bluebeard was the inspiration for the Gothic feminine horror game Bluebeard's Bride by Whitney "Strix" Beltrán, Marissa Kelly, and Sarah Richardson published by Magpie Games. It is centered on the premise of the fairy-tale with players acting out emotions and thoughts from the shared perspective of the Bride, each taking on an aspect of her psyche.
- Image of Bluebeard, a story published in 1965 in issue no. 7 of the comics magazine Creepy, is about a woman who suspects her husband is a modern incarnation of Bluebeard.
- In DC Comics' Fables series, Bluebeard appears as an amoral character, willing to kill and often suspected of being involved in various nefarious deeds.
- Bluebeard is a character in the video game The Wolf Among Us by Telltale Games, based on the Fables comics.
- Bluebeard's Castle, and its sequel Bluebeard's Castle 2: Son of the Heartless, is a hidden object puzzle video game created by Fanda Games and published by Big Fish Games, based on the fairytale Bluebeard.
- Dark Romance: Curse of Bluebeard is a hidden object puzzle video game created by DominiGames and published by Big Fish Games as part of their Dark Romance series.
- In the Japanese light novel and manga/anime Fate/Zero, Bluebeard appears as the Caster Servant, where his character largely stems from Gilles de Rais as a serial murderer of children.
- The Awful History of Bluebeard consists of 7 original drawings by William Makepeace Thackeray from 1833, given as a gift to his cousin on her 11th birthday and published in 1924.
- A series of photographs published in 1992 by Cindy Sherman illustrate the fairy-tale Fitcher's Bird (a variant of Bluebeard).
- Bluebeard appears as a minor Darklord in the Advanced Dungeons & Dragons (2nd ed.) Ravenloft accessory Darklords.
- In the collectible card game Magic: The Gathering, created by Wizards of the Coast, the card "Malevolent Noble" in the Throne of Eldraine expansion depicts Bluebeard.
- BBC Radio 4 aired a radio play from 2014 called Burning Desires written by Colin Bytheway, about the serial killer Henri Désiré Landru, an early 20th-century killer of women, often called a "Bluebeard".
- The 1955 film The Night of the Hunter includes a scene at the trial of serial wife killer in which the crowd/mob chants "Bluebeard!" repeatedly.
- A mausoleum containing the remains of Bluebeard and his wives can be seen at the exit of The Haunted Mansion at Walt Disney World.
- Ceramic tiles tell the tale of Bluebeard and his wives in Fonthill Castle, the home of Henry Mercer in Doylestown, Pennsylvania.
- Bluebeard and a variation of his tale appears in the manga Ludwig Kakumei.

== See also ==
- Susanna's Seven Husbands by Ruskin Bond
