= Fitcher's Bird =

German fairy tale

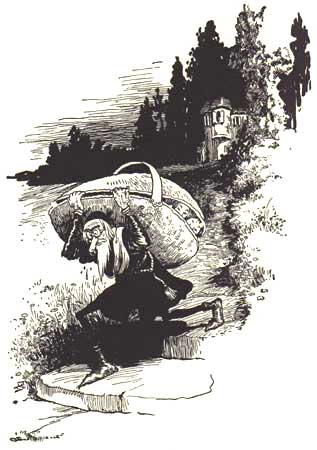
- Illustration to Fitcher's Bird by John B. Gruelle(?) (1914?)

Folk tale
- Name: Fitcher's Bird
- Aarne–Thompson grouping: ATU 311 (The Heroine Rescues Herself and Her Sisters)
- Country: Germany
- Published in: Grimms' Fairy Tales

"Fitcher's Bird" (German: Fitchers Vogel) is a German fairy tale collected by the Brothers Grimm, tale number 46.

It is Aarne-Thompson type 311, the heroine rescues herself and her sisters. Another tale of this type is How the Devil Married Three Sisters. The Brothers Grimm noted its close similarity to the Norwegian The Old Dame and Her Hen, also grouped in this tale type.

The tale also features the motifs of the "Forbidden chamber" and a bloodied item that betrays the bride peeking in that chamber against strict orders, and as such bears resemblance to the Bluebeard type tales (which are type AT 312).

== Synopsis ==
A sorcerer would take the form of a beggar to abduct young women as his would-be brides. After bringing the eldest sister of a family back to his home, he assured her she would be happy with him. Eventually, the sorcerer leaves but not before handing her the keys to all the rooms in the house and an egg to look after that was to be on her person at all times. However, he forbade her to enter one particular room in the house under the penalty of death. Ultimately, the sister did investigate the forbidden room out of curiosity and discovered a basin of blood at its center. Shocked at the dismembered body parts that she found there, she dropped the egg.

Once back home, the sorcerer could tell by the bloodied egg that the sister had gone against his will in his absence and had her suffer the same fate as the others from the room. Subsequently, a second sister from the family was carried off and suffered the same fate. It then came to be that the youngest sister found herself in the very same situation. But unlike her sisters, the youngest had put aside the egg before exploring the house. In the forbidden room, she found and assembled her sisters' remains which united and brought the sisters to life again.

Finding her egg unstained upon his return, the sorcerer was ready to marry the youngest sister. Freed from his power, she had the sorcerer carry a basket of gold back to her family without rest. She indicated that she would be watching from a window at his progress while she would make preparations for a wedding. Unbeknownst to the sorcerer, the voice that would scold him whenever he tried to take a break on his journey came from one of the two sisters hidden inside the gold-brimmed basket and not his bride-to-be.

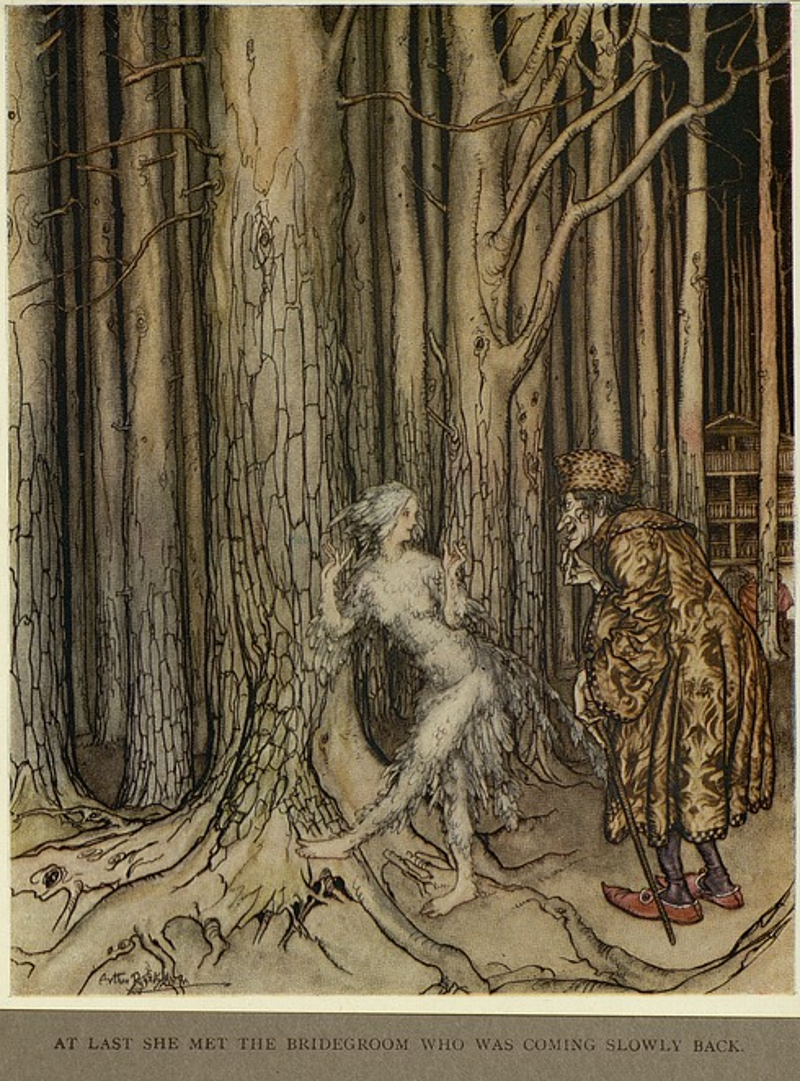
Arthur Rackham, 1917

Meanwhile, the youngest sister dressed up a skull and let it rest at the garret window, looking outwards; and covered herself with honey and feathers, so she looked like a strange bird. She left the house intending to reunite with her family. Along her way, she is addressed as "Fitcher's Bird" by passing guests to the wedding and the sorcerer returning from his delivery and asked of the whereabouts of the bride. As the bird, she replied that the bride had cleaned the entirety of the house and was now looking out from the window. Once the guests and sorcerer had all entered the house, the three sisters' brothers and relatives barred the doors and set the house ablaze.

== Etymology ==
Regarding the meaning of Fitcher, the Grimms wrote in the notes to the tale that "The Icelandic fitfuglar (swimming-bird), which looked as white as a swan, will help to explain Fitcher's Vogel," and although this "swan" theory was endorsed by Albert Teodor Lysander, later commentators merely gloss fitfugl as "web-footed bird," which is the Cleasby-Vigfusson dictionary definition. Others scholars advocate the view that the word derives from German Feder "feather" or Fittich "wings".

== Literary analogues ==
Modern folklorists classify the tale under AT 311 "Rescue by the Sister." (Note: Uther's TIF, under Type 311 lists: "German: Ranke 1955ff. I, Grimm KHM/ Uther 1996 I, No. 46, cf. No. 66, Berger 2001" (No. 46 is Fitcher's Bird)) A large comprehensive list of analogues to Fitchers Vogel, spanning many languages, can be found in the companion volume to the Grimms' KHM, the Anmerkungen edited by Johannes Bolte and Jiří Polívka, although this list is not culled down to contain only the AT 311 types.

A Norwegian analogue, The Old Dame and Her Hen (in the AT 311 tale group) was noted as analogue by the Brothers Grimm. (Note: Grimm cites "Asbjörnsen, S. 237" but this is the tale "36. De tre Sostre, som bleve indtagne i Bjerget" in Asbjörnsen and Moe (1843) p.237" to be more precise.) This Asbjørnsen and Moe folktale shares some essential features, such as the rescuer being of female gender, the other sisters being restored to life, and the villain being tricked into carrying the revived sisters back to their home. However, it lacks the "forbidden chamber" element, and she is merely confined to her captor's dwelling.

The Italian tale How the Devil Married Three Sisters belongs in this group. Here, the forbidden door is not bloody but leads to fiery hell. There are at least ten published Italian variants, e.g. Il diavolo dal naso d'argento "The Devil with the silver nose", more fully listed in the article for the Italian counterpart.

Another tale of similar plot and setting is the Scottish "The Widow and her Daughters", Campbell's Popular Tales, No. 41. (Note: Uther's TIF, under Type 311 lists: "Scottish: Campbell 1890ff. II, No. 41, Aitken/Michaelis-Jena 1965, No. 20, Briggs 1970f. A I, 446f.") (Note: Campbell actually notes that a 3rd variant to his "The Widow and her Daughters" (No. 41) is the same as the Norwegian "The Old Dame and her Hen". Campbell does not describe the 3rd variant extensively, but says it is the same as Peter Buchan's "The History of Mr. Greenwood", which was not published later until 1908.) (Note: Also "The Princess and the Giant" from Scotland (Barchers 43-46))

Insofar as the "Fitcher's Bird" is a tale of a serial-killing husband who compels his brides to the rule of the "Forbidden Chamber" (motif C611), it is closely similar to the Bluebeard (AT 312) type tales. And just as in Grimm's tale the bloodied egg gives away the misconduct of the elder sisters, the bloody key is the telltale sign that Bluebeard's wives have peeked in the forbidden chamber (motif C913 "Bloody key as sign of disobedience").

Among Grimm's fairy tales, the forbidden door features here and in Mary's Child (AT 710), as have been remarked in the notes to that tale.

Some European variants of the ballad Lady Isabel and the Elf Knight, Child ballad 4, closely resemble this tale.

== Modern adaptations ==
- Gregory Frost sets the tale among the doomsday religious cults of 19th century New York in his 2002 novel Fitcher's Brides.
- In 2007, the theatre group BooTown adapted a short play based on the Brothers Grimm fairy tale, called Fitcher's a Bastard, but his bird's alright.
- American artist Cindy Sherman adapted the story in a photographic spread for Vanity Fair.
- In the mobile game Identity V, during the third anniversary, the costume Monstrous Bird was released, and it is based on the tale.
- In the Chinese scifi drama The Spirealm, episodes 4-5-6-7 mention use The Fitcher's Bird and uses it as a theme of the second door. Episode 5 shows the three daughters with eggs in their mouth, asked not to drop them.

== See also ==
- The Robber Bridegroom
