= The Old Dame and her Hen =

Norwegian folk tale

The Old Dame and her Hen (Om Konen som havde 3 Døttre og en Høne)
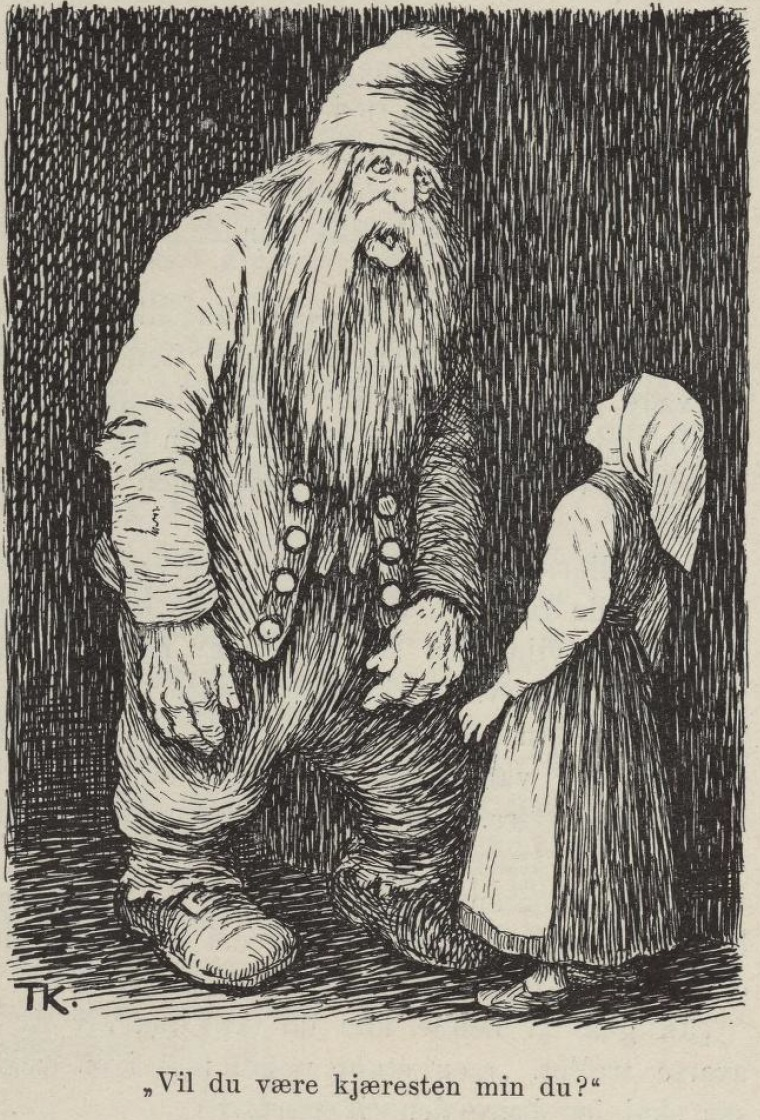
- Man o' the Hill (or Troll) asks "Will you be my sweetheart?", by Theodor Kittelsen

Folk tale
- Name: The Old Dame and her Hen (Om Konen som havde 3 Døttre og en Høne)
- Also known as: The Hen is Tripping in the Mountain (Høna tripper i berget)
- Aarne–Thompson grouping: 311
- Country: Norway
- Published in: Norske Folkeeventyr; Dasent, Popular Tales from the Norse

"The Old Dame and her Hen" is the English title given by Dasent to the Norwegian folk tale, Asbjørnsen and Moe’s number 35.

The tale's original title, "Høna tripper i berget" is more accurately rendered "The Hen is Tripping in the Mountain", as given in Reidar Thoralf Christiansen's translation.

The tale is categorized as Aarne-Thompson type 311, "Rescue by the Sister."

== Editions ==
The Norwegian folktale had earlier been published under different titles in earlier editions of Asbjørnsen and Jorgen Moe's Norske Folkeeventyr: "Om Konen som havde 3 Døttre og en Høne" ("On the woman who had three daughters and a hen," first edition, 1843), "De tre Søstre, som bleve indtagne i Bjerget" ("The three sisters who were taken in the mountain", second edition, 1852).

But "Høna tripper i berget" was the title in Jorgen Moe's manuscript from 1838, after Lars Hansen Svendserud of Ringerike.

== Synopsis ==
An old widow had three daughters, and only one hen for livestock. The hen had gone missing, and the widow she sent her eldest to find it, even if she had to go out in the hill above where they lived. After searching far and wide without success, the girl heard a voice call from a cleft in the rock:

„Hønen tripper i Bjerget!”
„Hønen tripper i Bjerget!”

"Your hen trips inside the hill!
"Your hen trips inside the hill!

and when she investigated, she stepped on a trap-door and fell underground. She went through a series of rooms, each room ever increasingly finer-looking as she proceeded, until in the innermost chamber she encountered a hideous-looking "man of the hill-folk" or "Man o' the Hill" (old spelling: Bjergmand; modern Bokmål/Nynorsk: bergmann), also later on referred to as "the troll" (Troldet). (Note: Christiansen's translation uses "mountain-troll.")

The troll asked her to be his sweetheart, and when she declined, he angrily wrung her head off. The middle daughter was sent out to look for her sister and the hen, but met the same fate. The youngest daughter too fell down the chute, but prudently did some exploring, so that when she opened the hatch-door to the cellar she discovered her dead sisters inside. Since she deduced what befell her sisters, when asked by the troll to be his sweetheart, she pretended to agree wholeheartedly.

Though she was furnished with fine clothing and anything else she desired, she proclaimed one day that she worried for her mother, who must be hungry and thirsty, with no one else there to attend to her. The troll would not allow her to go home, but if wanted, she could fill a sack with food, which he would carry to her mother. The youngest daughter stuffed the sack with gold and silver and put a little food on top to camouflage it. She forbade him to look inside along the way. After while, his load felt so heavy he was tempted to look, but she shouted after him that she saw what he was doing.

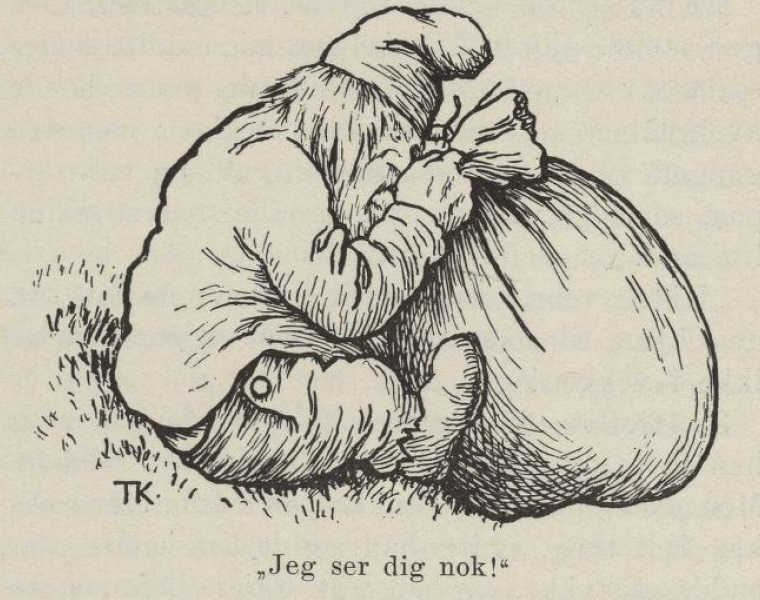
Troll tries to peek in bag and hears "I can still see you" (illustr. Kittelsen)

It so happened that a billy goat (Note: gjedebuk seems to be Danish, used as gloss for the Norwegian word bukk in Aasen (1873), Ordbog. The form Gede-buk is in Ordbog over det Danske sprog, but the Norwegian online dictionary Bokmålsordboka/Bokmålsordboka does not seem to list an equivalent.) fell into the hill, and the troll wrung the head off the "shaggy beast". When the youngest daughter complained that the animal could have kept her company, the troll took a crock (krukke) from the wall, smeared its content on the goat's wound to put the head back on the body, bringing it back to life.

The youngest sister awaited opportunity, and when the troll was away from home, used the crock to restore life to her oldest sister. Concealing the revived sister inside the sack, camouflaged with food on top, the youngest told the troll to carry that sack again to her mother, making him promise never to peek inside. When the troll did try to sneak a look, he heard a voice shout "I see what you're at!", prompting the baffled troll to answer "You've got one devil of a pair of eyes". (Note: Pokker til Øine, "damned sharp eyes" (Christensen tr.); "The deuce you do!.. plaguy sharp eyes" (Dasent tr.) The word pokker is glossed as "devil" or "a mild oath", as well as a "blemish or rash from smallpox, etc. disease".) The voice actually came from the sister he was carrying in the sack, but he mistook it for his sweetheart shouting. (Note: The same motif occurs in other analogue tales, such as the Italian How the Devil Married Three Sisters where the devil thinks he is watched from his bride from a long distance, even though the voice came from the bride's revived sister he was carrying.) The youngest made the troll carry the middle sister the same way, except it was a great deal heavier this time because she stuffed the sack with gold and silver as well.

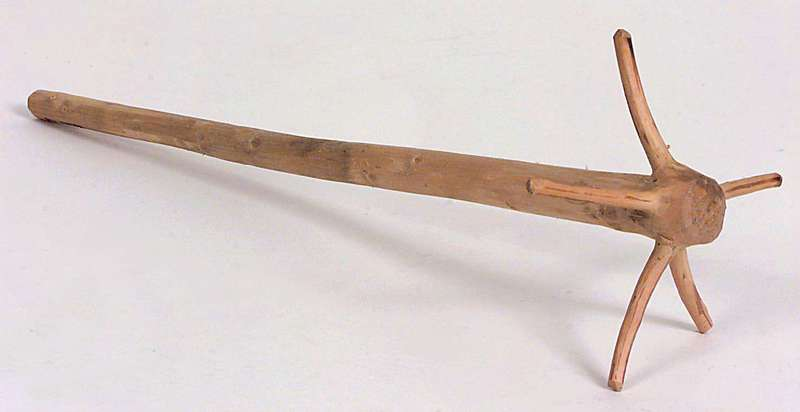
A tvare, the traditional Norwegian stirring-stick

The youngest then devised a scheme to make her own getaway. She gained more time by feigning sickness and telling him it was no use coming back until twelve midnight, because she will not have his dinner ready before then. Then she stuffed straw into her clothes, and propped up the figure by the hearth, making the dummy look like it was holding a stirring-stick (tvare, pictured right) in its hand. (Note: Dasent renders the straw-lass's tool as "a besom (a broom) in her hand" and had it standing by the chimney. But tvare is generally glossed as a stirring stick.) She then ran back home to her mother, and had a sharpshooter to stay with them. The troll came back to his home demanded his supper; when the straw-woman did not answer, he struck and realized what had happened; then he saw the bodies of her sisters were missing as well. Raging, he came after them, but the sharp shooter scared him off. He went back, but just as he was to go below ground, the sun rose, and he shattered into bits.

== Variants ==
A discussion of the Norwegian variants in English occurs in the piece written by Reidar Thoralf Christiansen for the festschrift to Stith Thompson (1957).

The antagonist may be a giant (Rise) instead of a troll, and indeed, Norwegian scholars often class the tale group under the title "Risen og de tre søstre".

In some variants the hen has the habit of wandering off to lay her eggs, and the women tie a string to the hen's leg to follow the trail of where it went. Others bear the title Gullskjaeren ("Golden magpie"), and feature a gold magpie (skjaere) that lures the sister to the giant's house.

=== Localization ===
A disproportionate number of specimens come from the old Bø Municipality (in Telemark), transcribed in the period from 1878 and 1880. The folklore of the area, including the tale group, is the subject of a book by Moltke Moe (1925).

== Aarne-Thompson classification ==
The tale is classified Aarne–Thompson type 311, "Rescue by the Sister". The correspondence with the Grimms' fairy tale KHM 46 Fitcher's Bird in this group was noted by Brothers Grimm. A lengthy list of folktales parallelling this Grimms' tale is given by Johannes Bolte and Jiří Polívka's Anmerkungen (abbreviated "BP"), although not all on the list are strictly type 311.

Type 311 tales included Italian folktale "How the Devil Married Three Sisters," which has many variants recorded across Italian regions.

There is also a Scottish analogue. In Campbell, Popular Tales of the West Highlands, the author says the Norwegian tale is the "same as " the 3rd variant to "The Widow and Her Daughters" (No. 41). Campbell did not print the Scottish variant in full, but noted it was the same as "The History of Mr. Greenwood" among Peter Buchan's collected papers, unpublished at the time, but later appearing in 1908.
