= How the Devil Married Three Sisters =

Italian fairy tale

How the Devil Married Three Sisters is an Italian fairy tale found in Thomas Frederick Crane's Italian Popular Tales (1885). It was collected and originally published in German as "Der Teufel heirathet drei Schwestern" by Widter and Wolf in 1866.

It is classified as Aarne-Thompson tale type 311, "The heroine rescues herself and her sisters".

Italo Calvino's retelling, entitled Silver Nose in his Italian Folktales (1956) is a composite, with its skeletal plot based on a Piedmont version featuring the devil-husband with a silver nose, fleshed out using variants from other localities.

== Synopsis ==
The following version was given by Widter and Wolf (Thomas Frederic Crane tr.):

Once, the Devil decided to marry. He prepared a house, disguised himself as a fine gentleman, and came calling on a family to woo their three daughters. The oldest agreed to marry him. When he took her home, he forbade her to look in a door, but as soon as he left, she did so, and hellfire in the door singed the little flower bouquet (Note: German: Sträußchen "nosegay") that she wore on her bosom. She could not hide what had happened, so the Devil said her curiosity would be satisfied, and threw her into hell. A few months later, he wooed the second daughter, but the same fate befell her as her sister.

Then he came to woo the youngest daughter, Margerita. She was a clever one, and suspected he had murdered her sisters, but the match was so good, it would have been a challenge to find one better. When administered the same test, she too was overcome by curiosity and opened the forbidden door, making the discovery that hell lay beyond it, that her sisters were there, and the man she wedded was the Devil. Margerita pulled out her two sisters and hid them away. By happenstance, she had placed her flower in water and it remained unscathed by fire, so her action went undetected. The Devil, reassured when he saw her flowers still fresh, came to love her unconditionally.

Hatching an escape plan, Margerita asked the Devil to carry each of three chests to her parents, making him promise never to put it down along the way. She said she will be watching. The Devil was tempted to unload the chest, but every time he was stopped by a voice that cried "Don't put it down; I see you!" although the shouting had really come from the first sister he was carrying inside the chest. It was a marvel to the Devil that his wife could see so far, and around corners even. The second sister was smuggled out in the same fashion on the back of the duped Devil. The third chest was for Margerita herself to be concealed inside. A dummy posing as her was affixed to the balcony (poggiolo) as if to keep watch, after which the maid helped load the chest upon the Devil's back. The Devil delivered the burden with even more exertion this time, thinking she was on the lookout from higher ground this time.

After returning, the Devil called out for Margerita, but his wife was nowhere to greet him. Spotting the figure on the balcony, he told her to come down, protesting of dog-like weariness ("stracco da can") and wolf-like hunger ("una fame da lov"). (Note: These are the only bits of Italian text for this tale given by the German editors Widter and Wolf.) Then he dashed up and struck her hard in the ear, only to discover it to be a dummy made of rags, with a fake head which was only a hatmaker's mold. Searching the house, he found her jewel box ransacked. He hurried off to his in-laws' house and there found his three wives alive and laughing scornfully at him, and the thought of three at once made him flee.

Since then, the Devil has lost the appetite to ever marry again.

== Italian variants ==
=== Calvino's retelling ===
Italo Calvino's retelling entitled Il naso d'argento ("Silver Nose") is based on the Piedmont version, but he found this rudimentary version to be meager, and expanded his retelling with added elements using variants from Bologna and Venice

=== Il diavolo dal naso d'argento ===
(Piedmont)
The original of Calvino's base story, "Il diavolo dal naso d'argento (The devil with the silver nose)" was collected in the Langhe region of Piedmont, by Carraroli, designated (P) below. The other texts that Calvino borrowed were the Bolognese version of Coronedi-Berti's "La fola del diavel" (B), and the Venetian "El Diavolo" (V). The Widter-Wolf/Crane text (WW) is also invoked here for comparison.

In (P), the stranger comes to the house of a single mother, not to woo her three daughters as in (WW), but to put them in his service. This man has a silver nose which raises the mother's suspicion immediately that he is the devil, but the first girl does not heed the mother's warning. In (P), when the daughter opens the forbidden door, the devil catches her in the act just as she was shutting the door. The devil in (P) then returns to the mother to fetch the second daughter, without stating a proper reason why, prompting a comment by Carraroli that the devil probably explained the bride to be content but still missed the company of others. (Calv.) however makes the devil explain that there were so many chores that one helper was not enough.

In (P), the third daughter is clever enough to keep her promise, whereas in (WW) curiosity gets the best of her and she opens the forbidden door too, but remains undetected because she had removed the flower bouquet beforehand. Consequently, (P) leaves unaccounted how the third daughter ever learned the fate of her sisters—which she inevitably had to know before she could have committed her next action of scheming their escape; whereas in (WW), she had discovered her sisters with other damned souls in flaming hell behind the forbidden door.

In (B) and (Calv.) the devil makes the three women wear a rose, a carnation, and a jasmine respectively instead of a bouquet, and the names are Zoza/Carlotta and Lucia/Lozla for the first and third daughters. In (V), it is a rose placed in the head each time. In all the non-(P) variants, the forbidden door hides the infernal flames that ruins the flowers for the daughters who fail the test.

In (P), (WW), and the other variants, the devil is tricked into bearing chests with the women hidden inside, whereas in (Calv.) he is asked to carry back bags of laundry, to the women's mother, who is a widowed washerwoman. Here, (Calv.) adapts from (V) where the clever daughter tells the devil she is stuffing the chest with a "bit of stuff (or clothes) to wash" (un poca de roba a lavar). (Note: (B) uses wording similar to (V), and the daughter claims to stuff her chest with "a bit of goodies" ("un poch ed roba") for her mother, though not for her to wash them.)

=== Additional cognate tales ===
A comprehensive list of analogues (for Grimm's tale Fitchers Vogel) spanning many languages is compiled in Bolte and Polívka's Anmerkungen von Kinder- und Hausmärchen der Brüder Grimm I (1913), (designated BP in folkloristics). (Note: The mother source of the tale type, the description and summary of AT 311 in Uther, Hans-Jörg (2004), The Types of International Folktales (snippet), vol. 1, Suomalainen Tiedeakatemia, Academia Scientiarum Fennica, p. 191 does not specifically mention "How the Devil Married Three Sisters" as a tale in the group, because it does not give a listing of tales in this group, and instead it gives bibliography. That biography starts with "BP I, 370-375, 398-412", i.e. Bolte & Polívka (1913), Anmerkungen von KHM; 46. Fitchers Vogel, S.398-412 just cited, and 40. Der Räuberbräutigam, S.398-412 (i.e., notes to The Robber Bridegroom, KHM 40, Type 955))

The reduced list below covers Italian examples classed as AT 311 types by modern commentators.

Published in Italian or dialects

- Bernoni (1873), "Il Diavolo," Fiabe e novelle popolari veneziane, no. 3 (Note: Calvino's Venetian tale)
- Carraroli (1906), "Il diavolo dal naso d'argento," Archivio XXIII (Note: Calvino's Piedmontese tale)
- Coronedi-Berti (1883), no. 27, "La fola del diavel" (Note: Calvino's Bolognese tale)
- Imbriani (1877), "[Gli] Assassini", La Novellaja fiorentina, no. 22. (Note: Summarized.)
- Imbriani (1877), "Il contadino che aveva tre figliuoli", La Novellaja fiorentina, no. 2
- Imbriani (1877), "L'orco", La Novellaja fiorentina, no. 1
- Imbriani (1877), "Lombrion", La Novellaja milanese
- Pitrè, "Lu scavu" (tr. Zipes & Russo (2009) "The Slave")
- Visentini (1879), "Il Diavolo" Fiabe mantovane, no. 39

Published in German

- Kaden (1880), "Der Albanese" (Translation/adaptation of Pitre 19. "Lu scalvu"). (Note: Of Kaden's 44 stories, 34 are translated from Pitre's Fiabe, Crane (1885), p. xxiv, citing Köhler, R. (1881). "Review: Kaden, Wald. Unter den Olivenbäumen..". Literarisches Centralblatt. XXXIIyear=1881: 337.. Köhler identifies "Der Albanese" as Pitre's No. 19)
- Gonzenbach (1870), no. 22, "Vom Räuber, der einen Hexenkopf hatte" ("Del brigante che. possedeva la testa di mavara"; tr. Zipes (2004) "The Robber with a Witch's Head".)
- Gonzenbach (1870), no. 33, "Die Geschichte von Ohimè" ("La novella di Ohimè"; tr. Zipes & Russo (2009) "The Story of Oh My".)

=== Lu Scavu ===
(Sicilian) Pitrè's collected Sicilian tale "Lu Scavu" (tr. "The Slave" by Zipes, and "Der Albanese" i.e. 'the Slav', by Kaden) features three daughters of a cavuciliddaru (German:Kräutersammler), that is, a man who gathers or sells cavuliceddi or leafy brassica vegetables (of the cabbages, mustards, or rapes kind) for a living. The man takes the youngest named Rusidda (tr. Rosetta or Rosa) and find a lovely mushroom, which they pull and tug, until there pops up out of the ground (pulled out by the ear, according to Kaden) a slave (or the Slav). The Slave bargains to have the daughter stay with him in his magnificent dwelling underground, paying the father a purse full of money. She is treated well, until one day the Slave leaves house and after making her promise to do whatever he bids her, instructs her to eat a hand with fresh flesh on it in his absence. Horrified, she crushes the hand up in a mortar and throws the mess in the toilet. Upon the Slave's return, she tells a lie, claiming she ate it, but when the Slave calls out to the hand, it answers and reveals its whereabouts. (Note: toilet. as per Zipes. Kaden merely says it is a Loche or "hole", but Pitre glosses cumun[i] as "luogo comune comodo" and Biundi (1857), Diz. Sic. It., p.109 defines "cumùni, s.m.. comune; per cesso, destro;" thus "toilet.) The Slave beheads and discards Rusidda, then bargains the father for the other sisters, Catarina (Caterina) who fails the test, and 'Ntonia (Antonia) who outwits the Slave. Antonia grinds up the hand and smears the mess on her stomach like plaster. She gains her captor's trust, discovers the fresh corpses of her sisters and kings and princes, finds a pot of healing, whose content when administered with a brush on the severed wound restored the missing body part and revived the dead. The rescued royalty offer to marry or adopt their rescuer, and Antonia chooses to be the wife of the Prince of Portugal. (Note: The daughter of the King of Portugal in Kaden's German tr.) There is an epilogue whereby the Slave tries to take revenge by transforming into an immobile statue or doll, dressed in Portuguese garb and placed in a glass cabinet, fooling the king into buying the doll as decor for his wife's chamber (Kaden's German translation is clearer on this; the original word for the furniture piece is scaffarrata, which Zipes translates as "cabinet", but is really a glass case). (Note: In Pitrè's footnote, the Sicilian scaffarrata is glossed "scarabattola", or "glass case". Curiously, the seller's call to buyers is, in the original text, "Who wishes to buy the beautiful Slave" ("Chi bellu scavu! Cu' lu voli accattari"), which Zipes changes to "beautiful cabinet" and Kaden to "schöne Statue") The Slave tries to harm her while she lies asleep, but Antonia notices, he is apprehended, all of the Slav's former victims are invited to exact revenge upon the villain until he is dead.

Several more Sicilian variants, under titles "Lu cavulicciddaru", (Note: Palermo and Trapani) "Malu cani", (Note: Summarized in #Malu cani below.) "Manu pagana", (Note: Summarized in #Manu pagana below) and "Manu virdi" (Note: From Ficarazzi, Borgetto, etc.) have also been noted.

=== Malu cani ===
(Sicilian) Listed as a variant to Lu Scavu by Pitrè, this tale from Cianciana has been summarized in brief by Pitrè and by Zipes. A mage hires three daughters to keep shop, and the ones that fall asleep are turned into stone statues. The third remains, and catches the miserable dog asleep (this is the sorcerer), giving her opportunity to reanimate her sisters.

=== Manu pagana ===
(Sicilian) This is tale IV in Pitrè, "Nuovo Saggio di Fiabe" (1873). (Note: From Villabate and Polizzi.) The manu pagana, or a "heathen hand", in Sicilian superstition refers to "the hand of an unbaptized child or of a strange servant who steals secretly." In this version, there are seven daughters, and the last one eats the hand by pounding it into a pill she can swallow. The antagonist is called Zu Drau (Uncle Dragon) (Note: Zu Drau IV, 5, o ziu Drau, drago. (Pitre's glossary))

There is nothing about the mage receiving his just punishment here.

=== La novella di Ohimè ===
(Sicilian) "The Story of Oh My" (Gozenbach ed., Zipes tr.). In this variant, the father's profession is a woodcutter, with three granddaughters. The youngest and smartest daughter is named Maruzza (diminutive of Maria). "Ohimè!" is the desperate cry of the grandfather, which is answered by the villain of the story, because it happens to be his name. The brides are tested by being commanded to eat a dead leg (similar to the motif of the hand given to eat in Lu Scavu above).

=== The Three Cauliflowers ===
(Tuscan) This tale, subtitled "Questa si domanda la Novella dei Tre Cavolfiori" was published in English translation by Violet Paget, collected orally in Colle di Val d'Elsa. (Note: It is listed as an analogue of the group by BP (Bolte-Polívka).)

The "cauliflowers" in the title and opening scene is evocative of the several Sicilian tales that feature broccoli-type herbage (cavuliceddu) or broccoli-gatherers. This tale is imperfect as type 311, since the heroine Francesca only makes her own escape, and is unable to rescue her two sisters (Luisa and Teresina) or the other victims, whose carcasses are hung in a closet. After drowning the tattletale lapdog, the heroine escapes from the mage ("the Mago") by bribing a carpenter into locking her in a box and tossing it in the sea. Armed with a sleep-inducing candle (made from the tallows of his victims), the Mago tracks her down in France where she has become queen. But Francesca blows out the candle, rendering the Mago helpless as he meets his death by the mob alerted by the queen's call for help.

== Aarne-Thompson tale type ==
The tale is classified as Aarne-Thompson tale type 311, "The heroine rescues herself and her sisters". It is cognate with Grimms' Tale KHM 46, Fitcher's Bird, with many analogues listed by Bolte and Polívka's commentary on Grimm's Tales (often denoted "BP").

It is sometimes also considered an analogue of the "Bluebeard type" tales, though strictly under the Aarne-Thompson system, Bluebeard is classed as type 312.

== See also ==
- Bluebeard
