= The White Dove (French fairy tale) =

French fairy tale

The White Dove is a French fairy tale collected by Gaston Maugard in Contes des Pyrénées.

It is Aarne-Thompson type 312, and an oral variant of the type, which is best known by the literary tale, Bluebeard.

== Synopsis ==
A woman would not marry except to a man with a blue beard. One day, a giant with a blue beard, a famous hunter, came to her parents' house, and she agreed to marry him. Because her new husband was rich, her mother considered what to give her and decided on three doves; she should send messages by the red dove if she were well and living peaceably with her husband, by the white if she were ill, or by the black if she were unfortunate or in discord with her husband. Her husband went hunting and gave her nine keys, forbidding her to use one. She used it and found eight bodies of women, hanging up. She dropped the key, and it was stained with blood. Her husband demanded the keys and told her to go put on her finery, because she would die. The woman sent off the black dove and set the white dove to watch on the roof; then she stalled, saying that she was dressing a bride. The dove called that it could see nothing three times, and then three times reported that her brothers were respectively far off, approaching, and there. They broke into the house. Her husband claimed they were about to eat, but he fell asleep over dinner, either from drinking too much or a sleeping powder, and the brothers killed him.

== Commentary ==
People were customarily buried in their wedding clothes, so that her statements that she was dressing in them was feigning to be resigned to death.

The oral tale differs from Bluebeard chiefly in that the villain of the piece is not a human being whose only sign of abnormality is his beard, but a traditional giant, and that the heroine actively sends for her rescuers.
