= The Robber Bridegroom (fairy tale) =

German fairy tale

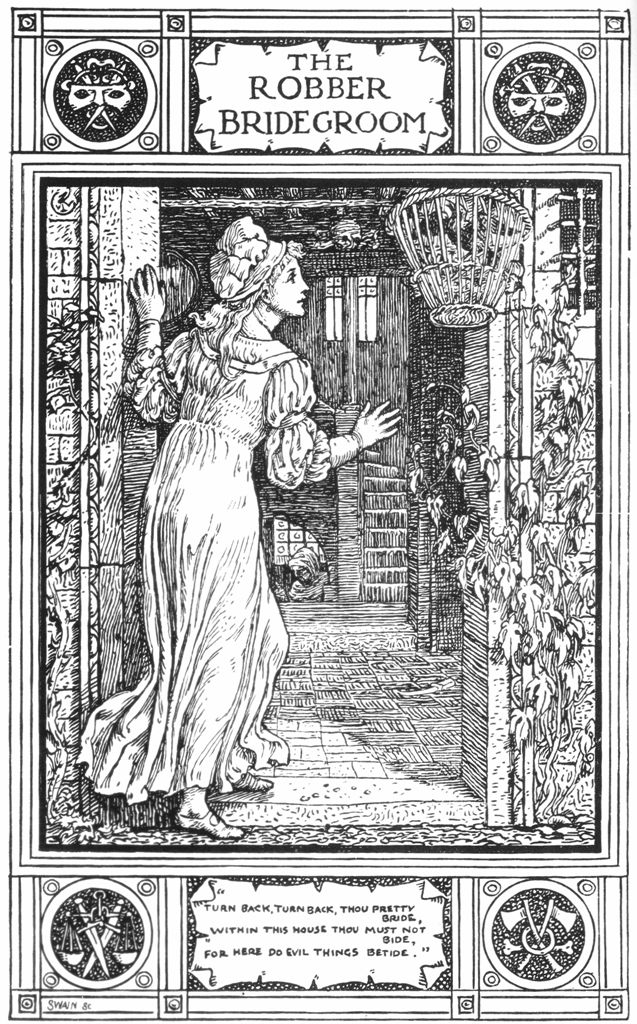
- Illustration of "The Robber Bridegroom" from Household Stories by the Brothers Grimm, translated by Lucy Crane, illustrated by Walter Crane, first published by Macmillan and Company in 1886.

Folk tale
- Name: The Robber Bridegroom
- Aarne–Thompson grouping: ATU 955 (The Robber Bridegroom)
- Region: Germany
- Published in: Kinder- und Hausmärchen, by the Brothers Grimm
- Related: Bluebeard; How the Devil Married Three Sisters; Fitcher's Bird

"The Robber Bridegroom" is a German fairy tale collected by the Brothers Grimm, tale number 40. Joseph Jacobs included a variant, Mr Fox, in English Fairy Tales, but the original provenance is much older; Shakespeare (circa 1599) alludes to the Mr. Fox variant in Much Ado About Nothing, Act 1, Scene 1:

Like the old tale, my lord: "it is not so, nor `t was not so; but, indeed, God forbid it should be so."

It is Aarne–Thompson type 955, the robber bridegroom. This type is closely related to tales of type 312, such as Bluebeard, and type 311, such as How the Devil Married Three Sisters and Fitcher's Bird.

== Synopsis ==
A miller wishes to marry his daughter off, and so when a rich suitor appears, he betroths her to him. One day the suitor complains that the daughter never visits him. He tells her that he lives in the forest and overrides her reluctance to visit by telling her he will leave a trail of ashes so she could find his home. She fills her pockets with peas and lentils and marks the trail with them as she follows the ashes.

They lead her to a dark and silent house. A bird in a cage calls out "Turn back, turn back, thou bonnie bride, Nor in this house of death abide." An old woman in a cellar kitchen tells her that the people there will kill and eat her unless the old woman protects her and hides her behind a cask. A band of robbers arrives with a young woman whom they kill and prepare to eat. When one chops off a finger to get at the golden ring on it, the finger and ring fly through the air and land in the lap of the hiding woman. The old woman discourages the group from searching for it, because "neither the finger nor the ring are likely to run away: they will find it in the morning."

The old woman then drugs the robbers' wine. As soon as they fall asleep, the two living women flee. Although wind has blown away the ashes that guided the miller's daughter to the house, the peas and lentils have sprung up into seedlings and the two follow the path of plants and reach the young woman's home.

When the wedding day arrives and the guests are telling stories, the bridegroom urges the young woman to tell a story. She says she will tell of a dream she had and tells the story of going to the murderers' den, in between each sentence saying, "This was only a dream, my love!". When she tells the part of the finger falling into her lap, she produces the finger. The robber bridegroom and all his band members are subsequently put to death.

== Variants ==
In the Grimms' 1812 version of the tale, the titular character is a prince. The bride is a princess, and her father is a king. The king has the authority to order the execution of the bandits. Starting in the Grimms' 1819 version, the bride is the daughter of a miller, and the titular bridegroom is a rich suitor. The band are executed by the courts rather than the bride's father.

In Jacobs's version, the woman, Lady Mary, went to the house out of curiosity, Mr. Fox having not even suggested that she come, and she was not told of the horrors there, but found the murdered bodies of women, as in Bluebeard.

Pushkin has written a variant of the tale called Жених (The Bridegroom), starting with the woman coming home from the robbers' house.

In an American variant, from the Ozarks, the heroine resolved never to marry and never did, because she had concluded men were bad; she just stayed with her own family, who were happy to have her.

== Adaptations ==
=== Literature ===
Eudora Welty's first novel The Robber Bridegroom adapts the story to eighteenth-century Natchez, Mississippi. In this version, the Bridegroom is a heroic outlaw whose rival (the historically real Mississippi bandit, Little Harp) is the bloodthirsty villain. This Bridegroom eventually kills Harp and marries the girl, Rosamond. Welty's version became the basis for a broadway musical of the same name.

Norman Partridge's story "Mr. Fox" is a retelling of this legend transposed into the modern era, published in his collections The Man With the Barbed Wire Fists and Mr. Fox and Other Feral Tales.

Neil Gaiman wrote a short story entitled The White Road, based on "Mr Fox". In this short story, published in Gaiman's 1998 book Smoke and Mirrors, a recent love interest of Mr Fox's has followed him home. She finds evidence of murder in his home and, later, witnesses the grisly killing of another victim. She reveals his true nature to a crowd at a local Inn, via a "story of a dream". She ultimately shouts that he is "Bluebeard" and "Gilles de Rais". However, unlike the original "Mr Fox", in Gaiman's version Mr Fox is actually innocent, and the woman kills him with her story.

Margaret Atwood's novel, The Robber Bride changes the sex of the villain to a predatory woman, Zenia, who metaphorically devours men after seducing them away from their partners. The tale is told through the eyes of the men's wives/partners, women whom Zenia befriends and then betrays. Other allusions to fairy tales and folklore are present throughout the book.

The Robber Bridegroom was adapted for the sixth issue of the comic series Grimm Fairy Tales. The story is retold as two sisters who are being courted by a mysterious count. When he chooses the younger of the two, the older sister murders her and becomes the Count's bride. However, it turns out that the Count is really a carnivorous ghoul, and he and the people of his castle devour the girl. This is a story within a story, being told to two bickering teenage sisters who are fighting over a boyfriend.

The titular character of Helen Oyeyemi's novel Mr. Fox is named for the robber.
