= The Bloomsbury Review =

Literary magazine

- Editor-in-Chief: Marilyn Auer
- Frequency: Quarterly
- Publisher: Marilyn Auer
- Founder: Thomas Auer
- Founded: 1980
- Company: Owaissa Communications Company
- Country: United States
- Based in: Denver, Colorado
- Language: English
- Website: www.bloomsburyreview.com
- ISSN: 0276-1564

The Bloomsbury Review (TBR) was a nationally distributed literary magazine founded by Thomas Auer (1953–2003) in Denver, Colorado in 1980. It focused on small, regional, university, and international presses, as well as "smaller" titles from large publishers. Authors Tony Hillerman, Wallace Stegner and Clarissa Pinkola Estes have praised it. The magazine received an award for excellence in the arts from the Denver mayor's office in 2008.

It was published by Owaissa Communications Company, Inc. and in 2010 had a total circulation of 50,000, including 10,000 paid subscribers.

Tom's sister, Marilyn Auer, was the magazine's last publisher and editor.

Although its website was still live as of February, 2022, The Bloomsbury Review ceased operation in 2014.

== History ==
The Bloomsbury Review started as a newsletter for Bloomsbury Books & Pool near the University of Denver in 1978. It was named after the Bloomsbury Group of writers, philosophers and artists who lived in London during the 20th century. The first issue, published in May 1978, was a folded 12” x 16” 4-page promotional handout. The cover story was a short piece about the Bloomsbury Group, and the featured review was on "Perjury: The Hiss-Chambers Case" by Allen Weinstein. It was written by Tom Auer. By 1980, the newsletter had become a full-fledged magazine.

"At that time, now the early 1980s, there were few decent publications about books. Most newspapers had either little or lousy book coverage, and the few general-interest magazines that made room for book reviews tended to cover the same best-selling titles and big-name authors," Auer wrote in an essay published in TBR's 20th anniversary issue. Most attention was focused on the major book reviews out of New York, he wrote. "But they tended to neglect books by western writers, small presses, university presses, regional publishers, first novels, poetry, and other titles that wouldn’t be promoted much with advertising in their pages. Most of the U.S. was on the wrong side of the Hudson River, it seemed."

TBR, Auer wrote, would focus on those neglected books and publishers.

== Masthead ==
=== Partial masthead, as of July 2010 ===
Publisher/Editor-in-Chief in absentia: Tom Auer
Publisher/Editor: Marilyn Auer
Art Director: Chuck McCoy
Poetry Editor: Ray González
Associate Editor/Arts Editor: Lori D. Kranz
Assistant Editors: Pennie Magee, Dawn W. Petersen
Director of Marketing: David M. Perkins
Bloomsbrarian & Contributing Editor: Kathleen Cain
Resident Cantadora (Keeper of the Old Stories) & Contributing Editor: Clarissa Pinkola Estés, Ph.D.
Resident Dada Beatnik & Contributing Editor: Janet Coleman
Southern Correspondent: Glenda Burnside
Roustabout: Michael Auer
Contributing Editor Emerita: Patricia J. Wagner
Distribution Assistant: E.J. Ricciardi
House Accordionist: Steven C. Ballinger
Secret Agent: James R. Hepworth
Champion & Slayer of Great Beasts: Harlan Ellison
