= Women Who Run with the Wolves =

1992 book by Clarissa Pinkola Estés

Women Who Run with the Wolves: Myths and Stories of the Wild Woman Archetype
- First edition
- Author: Clarissa Pinkola Estés
- Language: English
- Publisher: Ballantine Books
- Publication date: 1992
- Publication place: United States
- Media type: Print
- Pages: 520
- ISBN: 0-345-37744-3

Women Who Run with the Wolves: Myths and Stories of the Wild Woman Archetype is a 1992 book by American psychoanalyst Clarissa Pinkola Estés, published by Ballantine Books. It spent 145 weeks on The New York Times Best Seller list over a three-year span, a record at the time. Estés won a Las Primeras Award from the Mexican American Women's Foundation for being the first Latina on the New York Times Best Seller list. The book also appeared on other best seller lists, including USA Today, Publishers Weekly, and Library Journal.

Estés had been producing popular audiotapes of her stories and research and was approached by publishers to turn them into a book.

The stories printed in the book were given to her from her family, people she met on her travels, or her patients, as part of her work. The author sees the stories as a way to hand over knowledge about the cycles of life and forms of healing, and also as forms of art which can be used for healing and helping people along the way.

== Introduction ==
Deep instinctual nature became endangered through society as it is not regarded as important. Rationality and decision making through the head has become the primal and socially accepted way of things. The wild woman archetype is instinctual knowledge which everyone has deep inside. It is knowing when to stay and when to leave, when to let live, and when to let die. It is knowledge about the natural cycles of life in balance. There are high expectations on women nowadays: they should be everything for everyone. They were treated as property, objects, and lesser beings.

Fairy tales picture ways for growth and give instruction on how to find one's own right way. We may have lost the connection to our deep instinctual guide, but she is still there and can help us. The Wild Woman lives everywhere we are and can be found everywhere: In beauty, in daily affairs, in an honest smile. Many women long for the deep instinctual in a world where rationality thrives.

Through cultures the Wild Woman has many names in many different countries, e.g.: La Mujer Grande, the great woman (Spain), Dakini, the dancing force which produces clear seeing in women (Tibet), Psych-ology, knowing of the soul; Losing contact to the inner guide takes away joy and inspiration and makes women merely 'function' in everyday life. It makes women shaky, depressed, feeling powerless, shame-bearing, chronically doubtful and more. When women's lives are in stasis, or filled with ennui, it is always time for the wildish woman to emerge. Within every woman there is a place where joy and freedom live, a secret place for lush growing.

The Wild Woman can act as an ally, leader, model, teacher to women. She carries everything a woman needs to know and medicine for all things. To be with the instinctual nature means to act wholeheartedly and groundedly. Old scars and passion are doors through which a woman may find her way back to instinctual nature.

== Chapter 1: The Howl: Resurrection of the Wild Woman ==
The first story is about La Loba, a wolf woman who lives in the desert and collects bones. Once she has found a whole skeleton, she sings it alive again. This teaches us that the dead ideas and powers can be resurrected by using the soul voice. To do so, a woman needs to enter into a state of deep love and speak from that source. To gather the bones is to do creative work, e.g.: analysing dreams, dancing, making art.

== Chapter 2: Stalking the Intruder: The Beginning Initiation ==
The third story of Bluebeard is about a man who marries a woman and then leaves his keys to her in his absence. She goes exploring and uses the forbidden key. Behind the door she finds the bodies of his previous wives. The key is stained red and so she hides it, but Bluebeard finds out about her betrayal and wants to kill her for it. Scared, she calls for her sisters and they manage to kill her husband.

This story teaches us that there is a natural predator within the psyche of each woman. This man wants a woman to be only what he wants her to be: perfectly innocent and naive. But a woman cannot live a full life in being unaware of the danger and not caring to know more. We need to be curious and need to explore the dark corners of our mind in order to grow.

Every woman has that unnatural force which will seek to inhibit the natural instinct. The predator cuts women off from their ideas, feelings, and actions; although he longs for the light, he kills it. Therefore, we need to recognize such forces and protect oneself against its deadliness. But often, when we are young (mental and or physical) we do not see the danger, out of youthful enjoyment, physical attraction or pleasure. Thus, we are easily captured by the looks, charm, and wealth of someone.

Naive women as prey: Young women let themselves be captured, because they didn't learn to trust their instincts. They are told to be nice and behaved and taught not to see the predator as what he is. The predator cuts women off from their ideas, feelings, and actions; although he longs for the light, he kills it.

== Critique ==
American folklorist Barre Toelken criticized Estés' analysis of the Bluebeard tale as conflating versions from separate cultures. Toelken held this as an example of a tendency of Jung-influenced psychologists, who may overlook the complexities of folklore studies, to build complex theories around a single version of a tale that supports their own theory or a proposal.

== See also ==
- Motif-Index of Folk-Literature
