= Jennie Harbour =

English Art Deco artist (1893–1959)

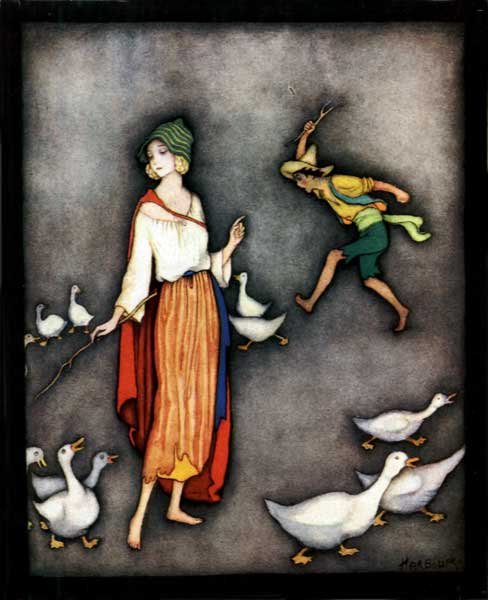
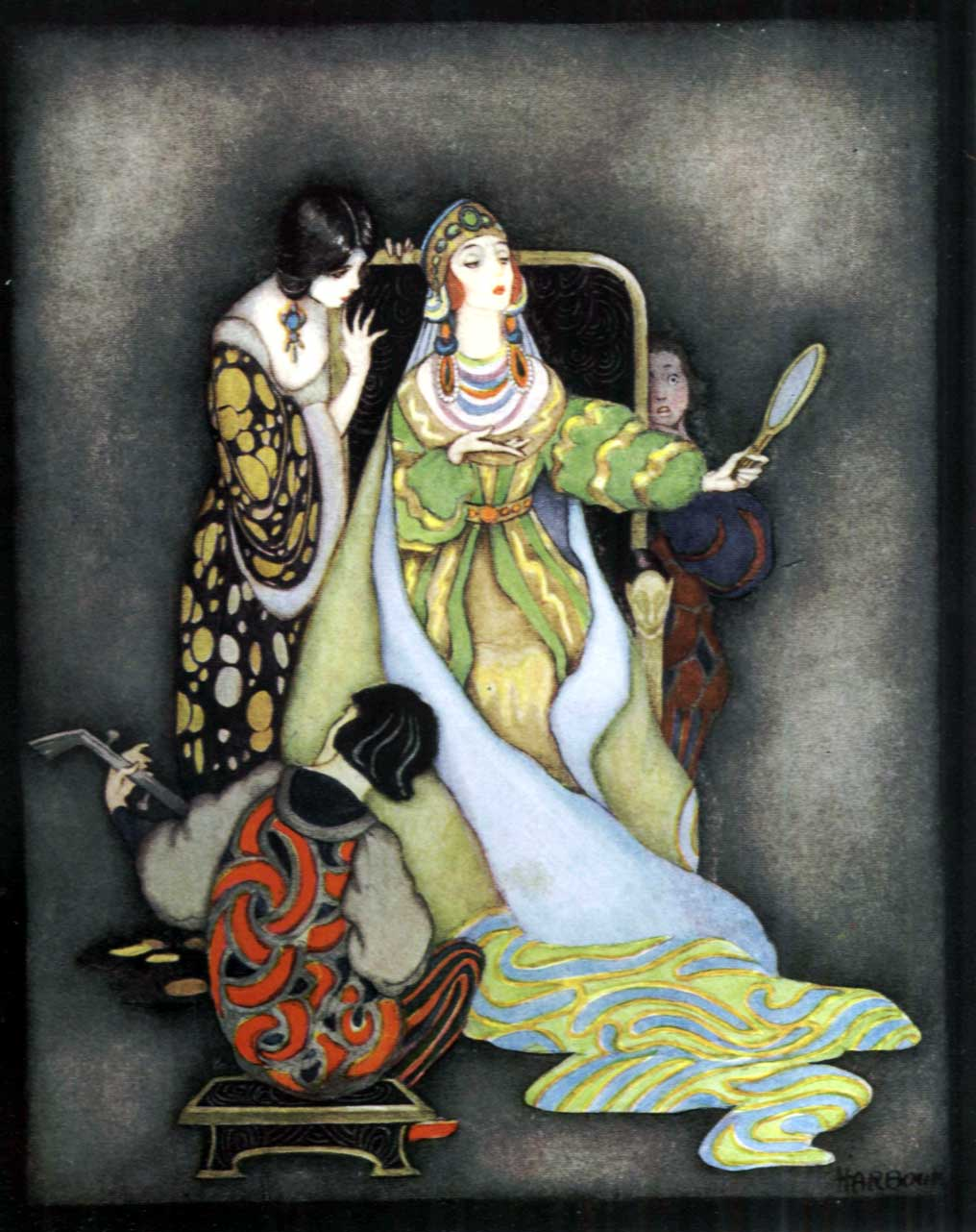
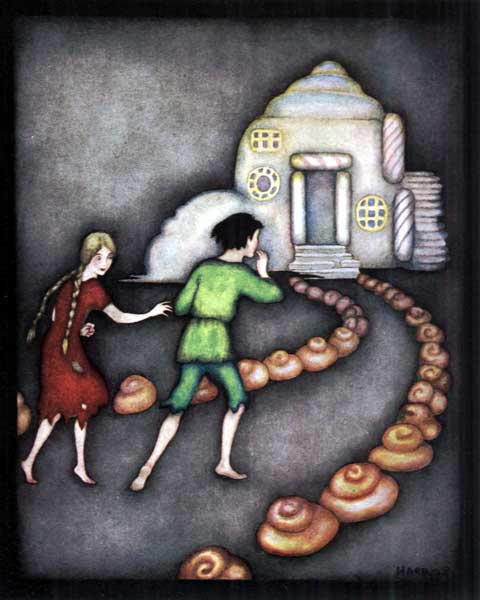
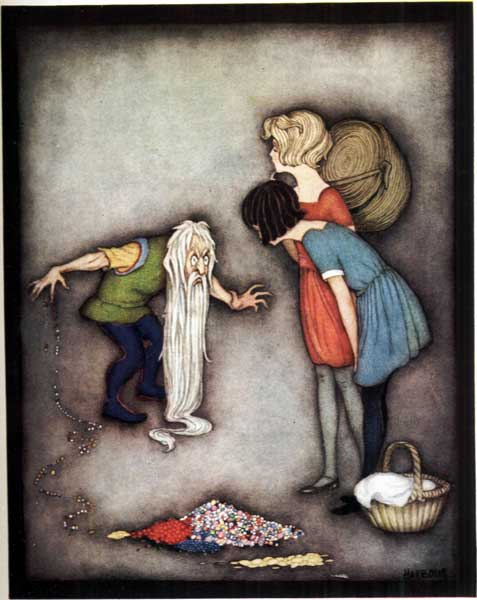
Illustrations from My Favourite Book of Fairy Tales. Clockwise, from top left,
- Goose Girl
- Magic Mirror
- Snow White and Red Rose
- Hansel and Gretel

Jennie Harbour (26 July 1893 – November 1959) was an English Art Deco artist and illustrator.

== Early life ==
Jennie Harbour was born in Aldgate in the City of London in 1893. Her father and mother, Charles and Sarah Harbour, were milliners, furriers, and dressmakers and had both been born in Russian Poland. Their four children, Rose, Jennie, Lily, and Arnold, were all born in London. In 1911, the family was living in Great Portland Street, Marylebone, and had two servants. Jennie, then aged 17, was still at school.

Harbour studied music with Miss Fanny Goldhill at the Bechstein Hall Studios, Wigmore Street, and in examinations in 1913 gained distinctions in harmony and grammar of music.

== Career ==
By 1919, Harbour was working for Raphael Tuck & Sons, a publisher which produced postcards, calendars, and books. At first, she created illustrations like 18th-century paintings of gardens and flowers for calendars. International orders came into the company for her "delightfully distinctive, bright and pleasant" cards in 1919. Her prints were very successful, and Raphael Tuck made an arrangement with Reinthal & Newman of New York to hand-print the works for the United States market.

In 1921, Harbour illustrated for Raphael Tuck My Favourite Book of Fairy Tales, which had twelve colour illustrations and others in black and white. She also illustrated My Book of Mother Goose Nursery Rhymes and Hans Christian Andersen's stories. She created the illustrations Call of Spring and When Autumn Winds Do Blow for Raphael Tuck in 1921.

In 1927, she illustrated The Yellow Fairy Book of the Newbery classics series, which was edited by Andrew Lang and published by David McKay Company. The book that was reissued in 1934 included 48 stories, including tales by Hans Christian Andersen and Native Americans and folklore from France, Germany, Poland and other countries. The Green Fairy Book, published in 1934, also included stories from a number of countries. The Story of the Three Bears, Thee Fisherman and his Wife, and The Snuff-Box were a few of the stories. Its authors included Anne Claude de Caylus and Madame d'Aulnoy.

At the time of the National Registration Act 1939, Harbour was living with her mother, Sarah Harbour, at 93, Belsize Lane, Hampstead, and her date of birth was registered as 26 July 1893.

Harbour died at 184 Kings Court, Ravenscourt Park, Hammersmith, in November 1959. Her funeral was at the West London Synagogue. Her remains were cremated and the ashes buried at the Hoop Lane Cemetery, Golders Green.

== Gallery ==
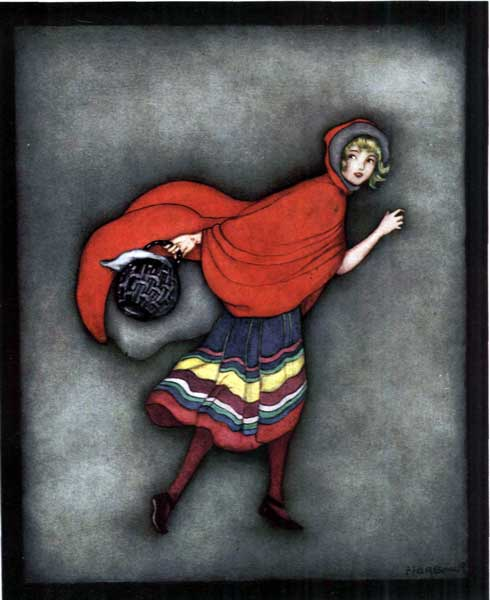
Little red riding hood

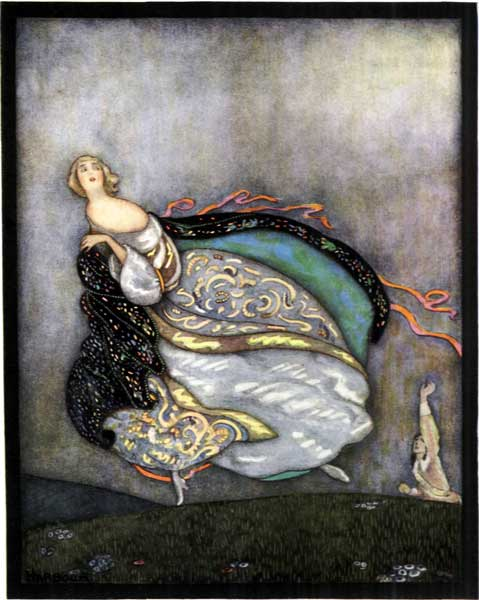
Cinderella
