= Clarissa Pinkola Estés =

Mexican-American psychoanalyst and writer

- Born: Clarissa Reyes; January 27, 1945 (age 81); Gary, Indiana, U.S.
- Education: Union Institute & University
- Occupations: Writer; Jungian analyst
- Writing career
- Notable work: Women Who Run with the Wolves

Clarissa Pinkola Estés (née Reyes; born January 27, 1945) is a Mexican-American writer and Jungian psychoanalyst. She is the author of Women Who Run with the Wolves (1992), a New York Times bestseller that remained on the list for 145 weeks and has sold more than 2.7 million copies according to the publisher. The book was reissued in a 30th Anniversary Edition by Rider & Co (Ebury Publishing) in 2022.

== Life and career ==
Estés was born in Gary, Indiana, to Emilio Maria Reyés and Cepción Ixtiz, who were from Mexico. She was later adopted by Hungarian immigrants. Estés earned her doctorate in ethno-clinical psychology from Union Institute & University in 1981, with a focus on social and psychological patterns in cultural and Indigenous groups. She completed a post-doctoral diploma as a certified Jungian analyst in 1984 through the Inter-Regional Society of Jungian Psychoanalysts, under the charter of Zurich, Switzerland. As of 2020, she has maintained a clinical practice for 50 years, working with war veterans, survivors of massacres, and disaster-affected communities. Her work has been published in 37 languages worldwide. Women Who Run with the Wolves appeared on multiple bestseller lists beyond the New York Times, including USA Today, Publishers Weekly, and Library Journal, with combined bestseller status spanning over three years.

Estés began her work in the 1960s at the Edward Hines Jr. Veterans Administration Hospital in Hines, Illinois. There she worked with World War I, World War II, and Korean and Vietnam War soldiers. She has worked at other facilities caring for severely injured children as well as shell-shocked war veterans and their families. Her teaching of writing continued in prisons, beginning in the early 1970s at the Men's Penitentiary in Colorado; the Federal Women's Prison at Dublin, California; and other institutions.

Estés developed the International Post-Trauma Recovery Protocol while serving earthquake survivors in Armenia, a methodology now used to train citizen responders for on-site psychological support within hours of disasters. Following the Columbine High School massacre, she provided trauma recovery services to students and the local community from 1999 to 2003. She continues to work with families of 9/11 victims on both the East and West coasts of the United States.

Estés served as a board member of the Maya Angelou Minority Health Foundation (now called the Maya Angelou Center for Health Equity) at the Wake Forest School of Medicine. Estés served as appointee by two Colorado governors to the Colorado State Grievance Board. She was elected as chair and for thirteen years worked with the state of Colorado Attorney General's lawyers, as well as a board of legal experts and helping professionals, to focus on public safety regarding mental health practitioners. She has been an advisory board member for the National Writers Union, New York, and the National Coalition Against Censorship, New York. She is an advisor to the Museo de las Americas and was a contributing editor and storyteller-in-residence for The Bloomsbury Review.

Estés debuted in spoken word performance at Carnegie Hall, New York (2000), along with Maya Angelou and Toni Morrison. Together they wrote lyrical song-poems for a libretto of Judith Weir's woman.life.song performed by Jessye Norman.

She received the Las Primeras Award from the National Latina Foundation in Washington, DC, in 1992. Estés was a recipient of the Book of the Year Honor Award from the American Booksellers Association in 1993, the Colorado Authors League Award in 1993, the Joseph Campbell Keepers of the Lore Award in 1994, a Catholic Press Association award for writing in 1994, and a Gradiva Award from the National Association for the Advancement of Psychoanalysis in 1995. Estés was also the recipient of the President's Medal for Social Justice from the Union Institute & University in 1994. She was inducted into the Colorado Women's Hall of Fame in 2006 in the Arts category.

Estés serves as managing editor for The Moderate Voice, a political news blog. She has contributed commentary to HuffPost, The Washington Post, Publishers Weekly, and The Denver Post. Estés founded the Guadalupe Foundation (also known as la Sociedad de Guadalupe), a human rights educational organization that supports adult literacy programs and broadcasts storytelling content via shortwave radio to underserved communities worldwide.

In 2023, Estés was appointed to the Colorado Natural Medicine Advisory Board, which advises state regulators on psilocybin policy, with a term through January 31, 2027. She serves as the representative for traditional Indigenous and religious use of natural medicines, drawing on her background in ethno-clinical psychology and her work as a practitioner of Indigenous healing traditions. Estés has described herself as an ally of María Sabina, the Mexican curandera who introduced Western researchers to ceremonial psilocybin use in the 1950s.

== Cantadora tradition ==
Dr. Estés identifies as a cantadora — a term from the Latina oral tradition meaning "keeper of the old stories". As a mestiza Chicana of Mexican and Native American heritage, she was raised in an oral tradition that combined Magyar (Hungarian) and Mexican storytelling practices. This cantadora methodology informs her analytical work: she retrieves and retells myths, fairy tales, and folk stories to illuminate psychological patterns in women's lives, particularly those related to the "Wild Woman" archetype. Her approach bridges Jungian analytical psychology with Indigenous narrative traditions, emphasizing story as a tool for soul retrieval and cultural memory.

== Reception ==
Her book Women Who Run with the Wolves received widespread popular acclaim and remained on the New York Times bestseller list for over three years. Reviews have noted its blend of Jungian analysis, folklore, and personal narrative; some critics question the mixing of scholarly citation with autobiographical voice, though Estés defends this approach as rooted in the Latina oral tradition of nos otros y tu ("we, you, and I").

Scholarly analysis has examined Estés's work through both Jungian and feminist lenses. A 2018 study in Rozprawy Społeczne notes that while Estés applies Jungian archetype analysis consistently, her interpretations also reflect a feminist-oriented approach that revalues female curiosity, intuition, and instinct as strengths rather than flaws. Some feminist scholars, however, have critiqued Estés for asserting a universal "feminine nature," arguing that such claims may overlook intersectional differences among women. Despite these debates, Estés's work is recognized for bringing female-centered narrative analysis into mainstream psychological and literary discourse.

== Books ==
- Estés, Clarissa Pinkola (1992). Women Who Run With the Wolves: Myths and Stories of the Wild Woman Archetype. New York, NY: Ballantine Books. ISBN 0-345-37744-3.
- Estés, Clarissa Pinkola (1993). The Gift of Story: A Wise Tale About What is Enough. New York, NY: Ballantine Books. ISBN 978-0345388353.
- Estés, Clarissa Pinkola (1995). The Faithful Gardener: A Wise Tale About that Which Can Never Die. San Francisco, CA: HarperOne. ISBN 978-0062513809.
- Grimm, Jacob; Grimm, Wilhelm (1999). Estés, Clarissa Pinkola (ed.). Tales of the Brothers Grimm. Quality Paperback Book Club.
- Campbell, Joseph (2004). The Hero with a Thousand Faces. Introduction by Clarissa Pinkola Estés (100th anniversary ed.). Princeton University Press. ISBN 978-0-691-11924-3.
- Estés, Clarissa Pinkola (2011). Untie the Strong Woman: Blessed Mother's Immaculate Love for the Wild Soul. Boulder, CO: Sounds True. ISBN 978-1604070798.

== Audio works ==
- Women Who Run With the Wolves: Myths and Stories about the Wild Woman Archetype (1989)
- The Gift of Story: A Wise Tale About What is Enough (1993)
- The Radiant Coat: Myths & Stories About the Crossing Between Life and Death (1993)
- The Creative Fire: Myths and Stories About the Cycles of Creativity (1993)
- The Boy Who Married An Eagle: Myths and Stories About Men's Interior Lives (1995)
- The Faithful Gardener: A Wise Tale About that Which Can Never Die (1996)
- How To Love A Woman: Myths and Stories about Intimacy and The Erotic Lives of Women (1996)
- Warming the Stone Child: Myths & Stories About Abandonment and the Unmothered Child (1997)
- In the House of the Riddle Mother: The Most Common Archetypal Motifs in Women's Dreams (1997, 2005)
- The Red Shoes: On Torment and the Recovery of Soul Life (1997, 2005)
- Theatre of the Imagination: Volume I (1999, 2005)
- Theatre of the Imagination: Volume II (1999, 2005)
- Beginner's Guide to Dream Analysis (2000)
- Bedtime Stories: For Crossing the Threshold Between Waking and Sleep (2002)
- Mother Night: Myths, Stories and Teachings for Learning to See in the Dark (2010)
- Seeing in the Dark: Myths and Stories to Reclaim the Buried, Knowing Woman (2010)
- The Dangerous Old Woman: Myths and Stories of the Wise Woman Archetype, Volume 1 (2010)
- The Power of the Crone: Myths and Stories of The Dangerous Old Woman and Her Special Wisdom, Volume 2 (2010)
- Untie the Strong Woman: To Know and Honor Holy Mother & La Nuestra Señora, Our Lady of Guadalupe (2011)
- The Joyous Body: Myths and Stories of The Dangerous Old Woman and the Consort Body, Volume 3 (2011)
- The Late Bloomer: Myths and Stories of The Dangerous Old Woman, Volume 4 (2011)
- How To Be An Elder: Myths and Stories of The Dangerous Old Woman, Volume 5 (2012)
