= Johannes Bolte =

Johannes Bolte (11 February 1858 – 25 July 1937) was a German folklorist. A prolific writer, he wrote over 1,400 publications, including monographs, articles, notes and book reviews.

== Works ==
- Zeugnisse zur Geschichte unserer Kinderspiele, Zeitschrift für Volkskunde 19 (1909), pp. 381-414
- (with Georg Polívka) Anmerkungen zu den Kinder- und Hausmärchen der Brüder Grimm, 5 vols, 1913-32
