= Jiří Polívka (linguist) =

Czech linguist (1858–1933)

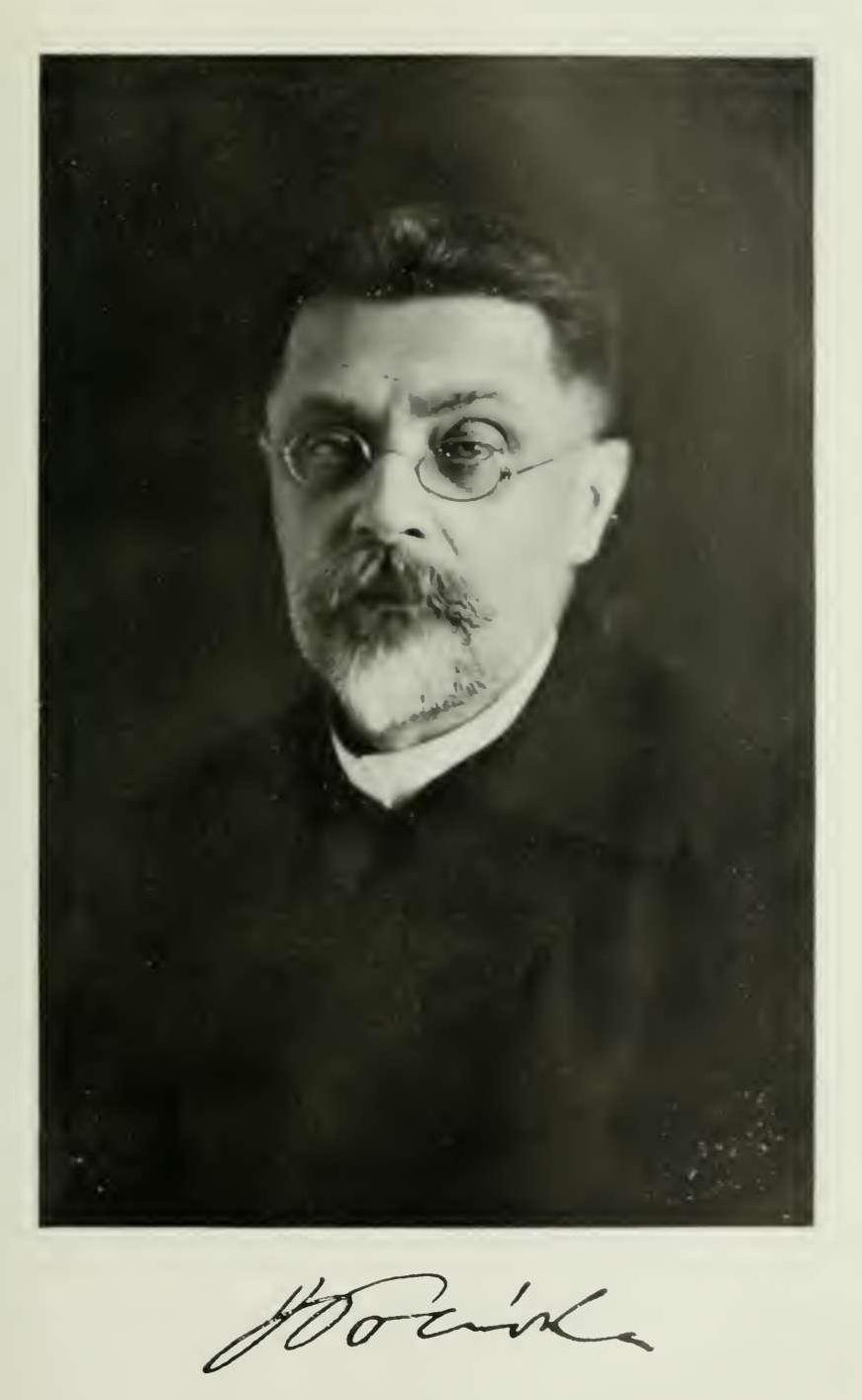
Polívka in 1918

Jiří Polívka (6 March 1858 in Enns – 21 March 1933 in Prague) was a Czech linguist, slavist, literary historian and folklorist. He was a disciple of Jan Gebauer. In 1895, he was appointed professor at Charles University in Prague. He became a corresponding member of the Czech Academy of Sciences and Arts and a corresponding member of the St. Petersburg Academy of Sciences (1901). He was a supporter of Theodor Benfey’s migration theory. His major work was the collection of Slavic Tales (1932) and studies about Slavic dialectology.

Polívka is interred at the Vinohrady Cemetery in Prague.

== Literature ==
- HLÔŠKOVÁ, Hana – ZELENKOVÁ, Anna (Eds.): Slavista Jiří Polívka v kontexte literatúry a folklóru I.–II. Bratislava: Katedra etnológie a kultúrnej antropológie FF UK, Slavistický ústav Jána Stanislava SAV, Ústav etnológie SAV; Brno: Česká asociace slavistů, Slavistická společnost Franka Wollmana v Brne, 2008. 248 p. ISBN 978-80-969992-0-0.
