= The Art of the Deal (disambiguation) =

The Art of the Deal is a 1987 book credited to American businessman Donald Trump and journalist Tony Schwartz.

The Art of the Deal may also refer to

- The Art of the Deal: The Movie, 2016 American parody film
- "The Art of the Deal" (Prison Break), episode of Prison Break season 3
- "The Art of the Deal" (Blood & Oil), episode of Blood & Oil
- "Art of the Deal" (American Pickers), episode of American Pickers season 2
