= American Pickers =

American reality television series

- Also known as: Pickers
- Genre: Reality
- Created by: Mike Wolfe
- Developed by: Mark Poertner; Stephen Pettinger
- Directed by: Anthony Mastanduno
- Starring: Mike Wolfe; Frank Fritz; Danielle Colby; Robbie Wolfe
- Theme music composer: Jingle Punks Music
- Composer: The Dark Studio
- Country of origin: United States
- Original language: English
- No. of seasons: 27
- No. of episodes: 402 (list of episodes)

Production
- Executive producers: Charles Tremayne; Mark Poertner; Mike Wolfe
- Producers: Simon Lloyd; Stephen Pettinger; Julie Cooper
- Production locations: LeClaire, Iowa; Nashville
- Cinematography: John Chiappardi
- Editors: Julianna Borg; Max Cherpitel; Charles Montany; William Shaw
- Camera setup: Multi-camera
- Running time: 60 minutes
- Production companies: Cineflix (AP2/AP3/AP4/AP5) Inc.; A&E Television Networks, LLC

Original release
- Network: History
- Release: January 18, 2010 – present

American Pickers (or also known as The Pickers for international broadcasts) is an American reality television series that premiered on January 18, 2010, on the History Channel, produced by A&E Networks in collaboration with Cineflix Media. In the series, the hosts travel across America in search of rare Americana artifacts and national treasures that they can buy from the collectors to add to their personal collections or sell in their antique shops.

== Overview ==
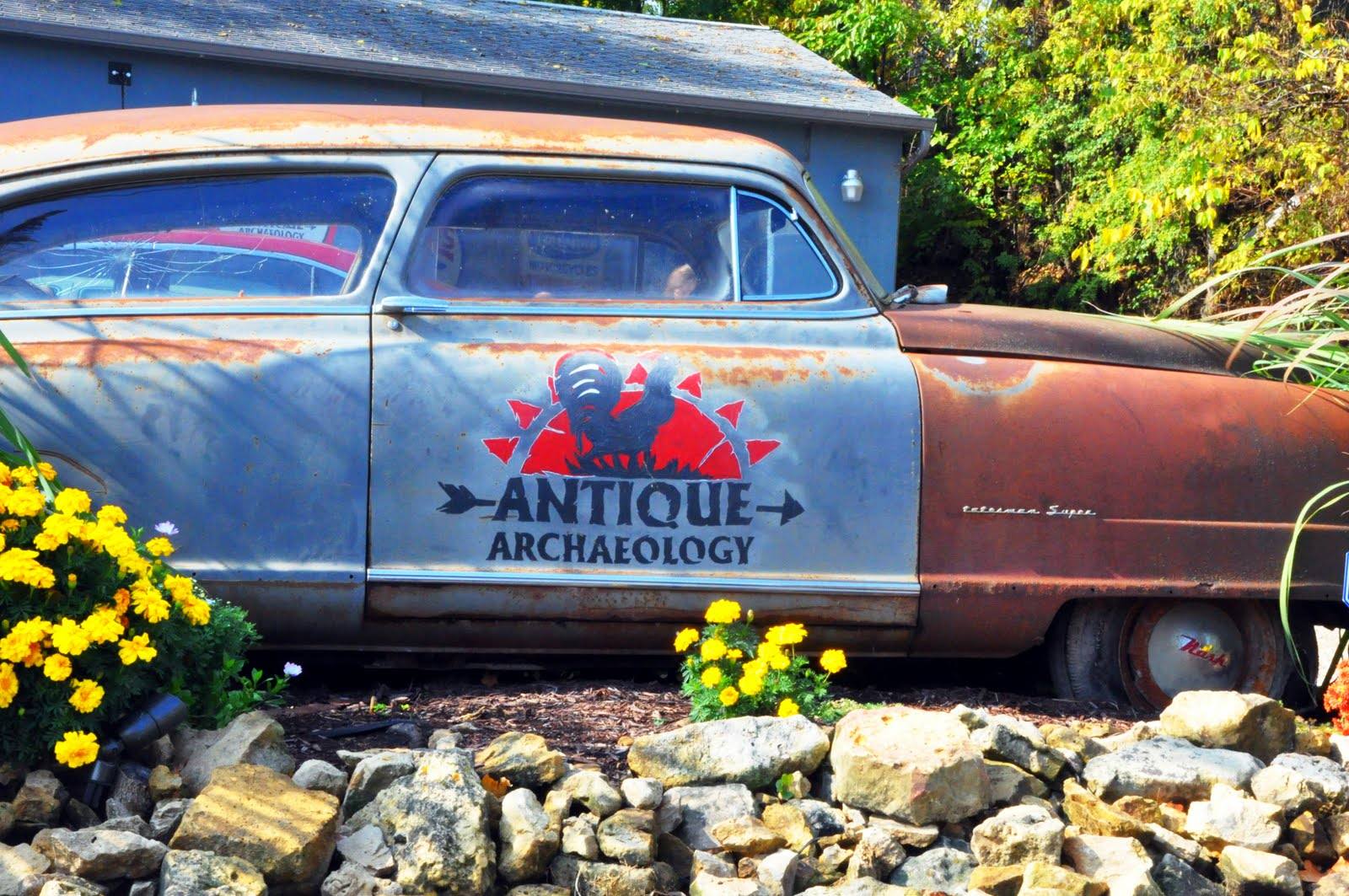
A Nash Statesman Super in front of the Antique Archaeology building in LeClaire, Iowa

The show follows antique and collectible picker Mike Wolfe and a co-host (originally Frank Fritz until 2022), who travel around the United States to buy (or "pick") various items for resale, for clients, or for their personal collections. Danielle Colby runs the office of Wolfe's business, Antique Archaeology, from their home base in LeClaire, Iowa. They originally traveled in a Mercedes-Benz Sprinter van and now in a Ford Transit. The pickers go on the road, not only following up leads that Colby has generated but also "freestyling"–stopping at places that look like they might hold items worth buying. They also pick some places more than once.

The first three seasons used a lengthy introduction, but beginning with Season 4, a shortened version began to be used:

[W]e're pickers. We travel the back roads of America looking to buy rusty gold.

We're looking for amazing things buried in people's garages and barns. What most people see as junk, we see as dollar signs. We'll buy anything we think we can make a buck on. Each item we pick has a history all its own. And the people we meet? Well, they're a breed all their own.

We make a living telling the history of America... one piece at a time.

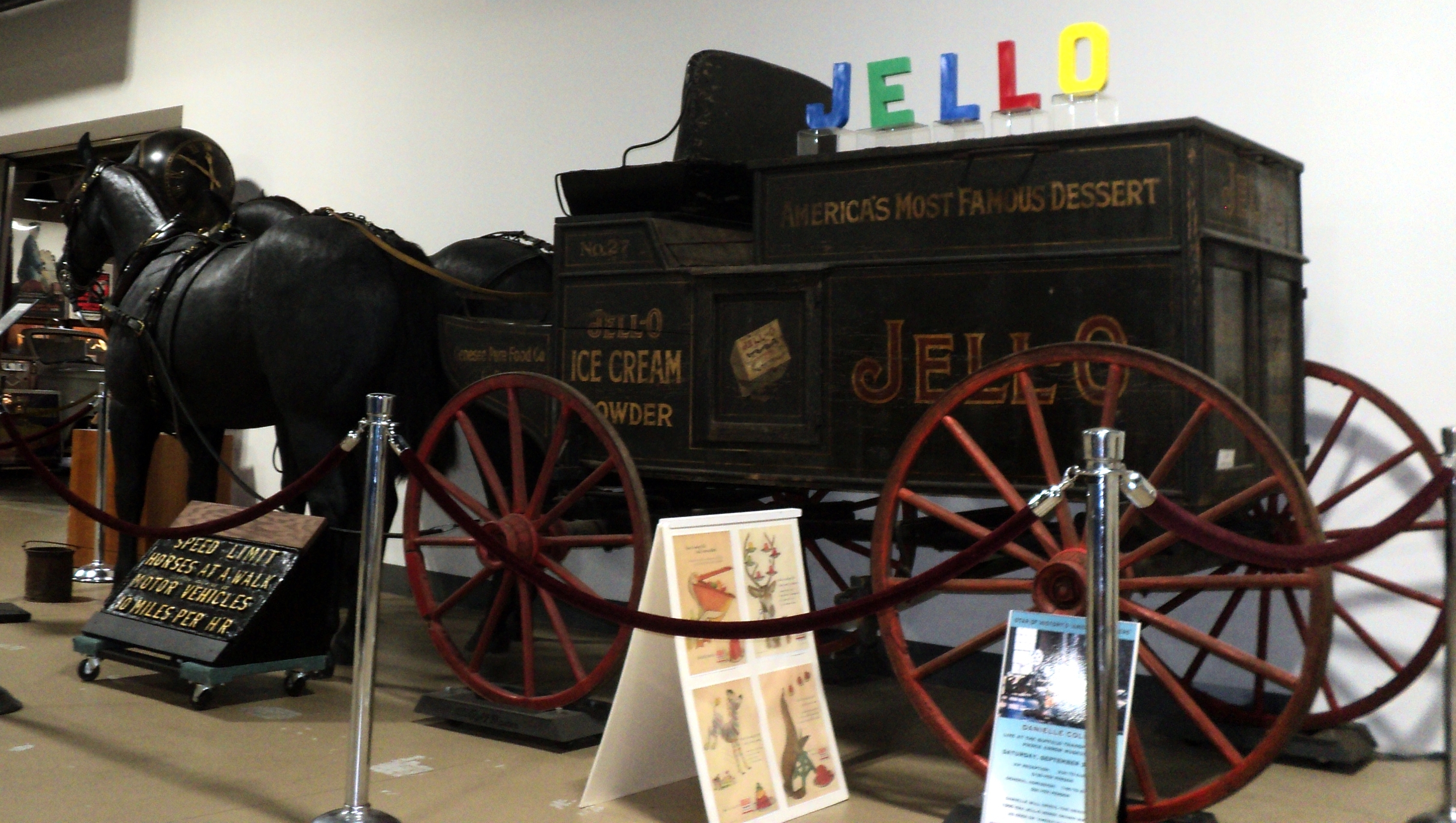
Jell-O wagon saved by the Pickers in 2017, now on display at the Pierce-Arrow Museum in Buffalo, New York.

The pickers explore people's homes, barns, sheds, outbuildings, and other places where they have stored antiques and collectibles. They call upon amateur and serious collectors, hoarders, and also people who have inherited large collections of items. Wolfe, who has been picking since age four, has a particular interest in antique motorcycles, air-cooled Volkswagens, old bicycles, and penny-farthings. They have purchased old advertisements and commercial signage, film posters, a rare 15-gallon visible gasoline pump, and a Piaggio Ape (pronounced "ah-pay") which a friend told them is probably the only one of its kind in North America.

In December 2011, American Pickers revealed that Antique Archaeology had leased part of a former 1914 car factory in Nashville which originally made the Marathon automobile for a second business location to decrease the distance required to haul their finds from the southern states. This location subsequently closed in 2025.

On July 21, 2021, The History Channel announced that Frank Fritz was leaving American Pickers. On July 21, 2022, various news outlets reported that Fritz was hospitalized with a stroke. In a late May 2023 visit between Fritz and Wolfe, Fritz deferred rejoining the series at that time due to his health. Colby, Mike Wolfe's younger brother Robbie, and friend and antiques expert "Jersey Jon" Szalay have since taken turns accompanying Wolfe on his road trips. They also occasionally make their own trips independently.

Fritz was born on October 11, 1963, and died on September 30, 2024, at the age of 60.

== Reception ==
The series debuted on January 18, 2010. The premiere episode of American Pickers had 3.1 million viewers, making it the highest rated History channel debut since Ice Road Truckers in 2007. The September 8, 2010, episode "Laurel & Hardy" garnered Nielsen ratings as high as 5.3 million viewers in the 25–54 age group. As of that episode, the show retained the title of #1 new non-fiction series of 2010 among all viewers and adults 25–54.

=== Australia ===
American Pickers was also shown in Australia on 7mate. In 2013, an Australian version of the show, called Aussie Pickers, premiered on 7mate. The series ran until 2014, lasting two seasons. In 2019, Road to Riches was launched on A&E Australia.

=== Ireland ===
In 2020, A+E Networks UK commissioned Irish Pickers, which follows Irish antique dealer Ian Dowling. It premiered on Blaze and is narrated by Ardal O'Hanlon.

== Episodes ==
Season	Episodes	Originally released	
Season	Episodes	First released	Last released
1	12	January 18, 2010	April 5, 2010
2	13	June 7, 2010	October 11, 2010
3	13	December 6, 2010	April 11, 2011
4	12	June 1, 2011	September 26, 2011
5	13	November 28, 2011	March 5, 2012
6	10	April 9, 2012	July 9, 2012
7	12	August 13, 2012	December 17, 2012
8	9	January 14, 2013	March 11, 2013
9	12	May 27, 2013	August 19, 2013
10	12	October 9, 2013	December 18, 2013
11	15	January 8, 2014	June 11, 2014
12	14	July 30, 2014	December 17, 2014
13	24	January 14, 2015	September 9, 2015
14	19	October 14, 2015	March 2, 2016
15	12	May 4, 2016	August 2, 2016
16	17	October 3, 2016	January 30, 2017
17	11	April 10, 2017	July 24, 2017
18	13	October 16, 2017	March 12, 2018
19	23	April 9, 2018	November 26, 2018
20	24	January 21, 2019	September 9, 2019
21	21	October 21, 2019	August 3, 2020
22	23	January 25, 2021	September 6, 2021
23	20	January 1, 2022	September 17, 2022
24	18	January 4, 2023	August 23, 2023
25	15	December 27, 2023	March 27, 2024
26	14	October 9, 2024	January 15, 2025
27	21	July 2, 2025	April 12, 2026

== Home media ==
DVD name	Format	Ep #	Discs	Region 1 (USA)	Region 4 (Australia)
American Pickers (Collection 01)	DVD	Season 01, Episode 01-12	03	1 June 2010	6 April 2011
American Pickers (Collection 02)	DVD	Season 02, Episodes 01-08	02		1 February 2012
American Pickers (Collection 03)	DVD	Season 02, Episodes 09-13 Season 03, Episodes 01-03	02		5 September 2012
American Pickers (Collection 04)	DVD	Season 03, Episodes 04-11	02		9 January 2013
American Pickers (Collection 05)	DVD	Season 03, Episodes 12-13 Season 04, Episodes 01-12	04		3 July 2013
American Pickers (Collection 06)	DVD	Season 05, Episodes 01-13 Season 06, Episodes 01	03		4 December 2013
American Pickers (Collection 07)	DVD	Season 06, Episode 02-10 Season 07, Episodes 01-04	03		5 March 2014
American Pickers (Collection 08)	DVD	Season 07, Episodes 06-12 Season 08, Episodes 01-04	03		4 June 2014
American Pickers (Collection 09)	DVD	Season 08, Episodes 05-09 Season 09, Episodes 01-07	03		1 October 2014
American Pickers: Picking It Forward (Collection 10)	DVD	Season 09, Episode 08-12 Season 10, Episodes 01-04 Season 10, Episodes 06-08 & 11	03		2 March 2015
American Pickers: Pick or Treat (Collection 11)	DVD	Season 10, Episode 05 Season 10, Episodes 09-10 Season 10, Episode 12-13 Season 11, Episodes 01-08	03		6 July 2015
American Pickers: Big Boy Toys (Collection 12)	DVD	Season 11, Episodes 09-15 Season 12, Episodes 01-07	03		9 September 2015
American Pickers: Museum Men (Collection 13)	DVD	Season 12, Episodes 08-11 Season 12, Episodes 13-14 Season 13, Episodes 01-09	04		2 March 2016
American Pickers: On The Hunt (Collection 14)	DVD		04		1 July 2016
American Pickers: Oddities & Commodities (Collection 15)	DVD	Season 14, Episode 01-05 Season 14, Episodes 10-19	03		1 September 2016
American Pickers: Planes, Frames and Automobiles (Collection 16)	DVD	Season 15, Episode 01-10	03		5 July 2017
American Pickers: Divide & Conquer (Collection 17)	DVD	Season 15, Episode 12 Season 16, Episodes 01-17 Season 17, Episode 06	04		4 October 2017
American Pickers: Tunnels & Treasures (Collection 18)	DVD	Season 17, Episodes 01-05 Season 17, Episodes 07-11	03		28 March 2018
American Pickers: The Mother Load (Collection 19)	DVD	Season 18, Episodes 01-06 Season 18, Episode 08 Season 18, Episodes 10,13	03		4 July 2018
American Pickers: Junkyard Wizard (Collection 20)	DVD	Season 18, Episodes 07,09-10 Season 19, Episodes 01-08	03		6 February 2019
American Pickers: Pickers Like It Hot (Collection 21)	DVD	Season 19, Episodes 09-23	04		5 June 2019
American Pickers: Raiders Of The Lost Pick (Collection 22)	DVD	Season 20, Episodes 01-12	03		5 February 2020
American Pickers: California Picking (Collection 23)	DVD	Season 20, Episodes 13-24	03		4 March 2020
American Pickers: Midwest Mayhem (Collection 24)	DVD	Season 20, Episode 01-11	03	N/A	7 April 2021
American Pickers: Back Road Buys (Collection 25)	DVD	Season 20, Episode 12-??	03	N/A	2 June 2021
American Pickers: Mega Collection	DVD	Box set containing: Planes, Frames & Automobiles Divide & Conquer Tunnels & Treasures The Mother Load Junkyard Wizard Pickers Like It Hot			6 November 2019

== In other media ==
- In the NCIS episode, "One Man's Trash", Gibbs and Ducky watch American Pickers and see an antique war stick from a 16-year-old cold case. Mike Wolfe guest stars as himself in the episode.

== Related ==
In 2026, History's Greatest Picks has been made with Mike Wolfe.

== Notes ==
The series was re-broadcast on ITV4 from 6 October 2025 onwards.

The series was re-broadcast on Channel 4 from 20 October 2025 onwards.

The series was re-broadcast on More 4 from 12 October 2026 onwards.

== See also ==
- Canadian Pickers / Cash Cowboys (2011–13), a similar TV series featuring two pickers in Canada; produced by Cineflix Media for the History channel in Canada.
- Picker Sisters, a 2011 TV series about two female pickers/designers.
- Picked Off, History's 2012 reality competition series, also produced by Cineflix Media.
