= Danielle Colby =

American reality television personality (born 1975)

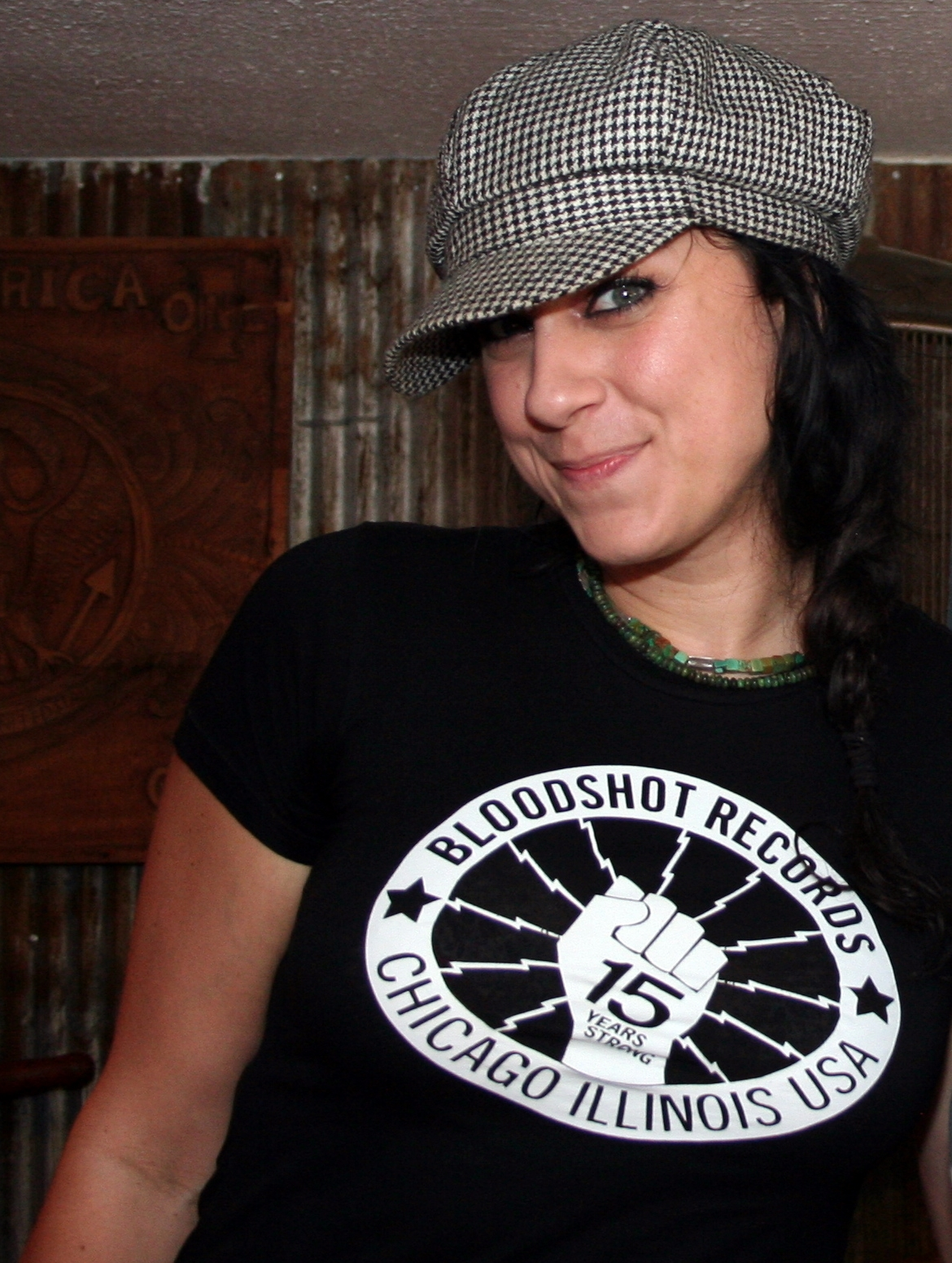
- Colby in 2010
- Born: December 3, 1975 (age 50); Davenport, Iowa, U.S.
- Occupations: Burlesque dancer Antique shop office manager TV personality
- Website: daniellecolby.com

Danielle Colby (born December 3, 1975) is an American reality television personality who appears on the History reality television show American Pickers.

== Personal life ==
Danielle Colby was born in Davenport, Iowa which is on the Mississippi River and grew up as a Jehovah's Witness. By 2004, she had married twice and had two children. Her television career eventually led to the breakup of her second marriage. In May 2012, she told WQAD-TV that "fame and notoriety are not easy for him to deal with at all, so the relationship ended up not working out."

== Performance career ==
Colby owned and played on a female roller derby team, the Big Mouth Mickies, for three years until injuries forced her to give it up.

While living with her family in Chicago, she attended a burlesque performance starring comedian Margaret Cho and dancer Satan's Angel prompting her to become a burlesque dancer. After she moved back with her family to the Quad Cities area of Iowa, she created the professional burlesque troupe Burlesque Le Moustache, with nine performers, including Colby herself with the stage name Dannie Diesel. They toured eastern Iowa and western Illinois. As of October 2014, Colby owned a burlesque academy called Dannie Diesel's Bump 'n' Grind Academy in the Rogers Park neighborhood of Chicago which is by Evanston.

== American Pickers ==
Colby was a close friend of American Pickers' Mike Wolfe for a decade before the concept of the show had even been developed. Once the show was sold to the History Channel, Wolfe asked Colby to work at the office of the antique shop Antique Archaeology.

American Pickers premiered on the History Channel on January 18, 2010.

== Fashion design ==
Colby owned and operated 4 Miles 2 Memphis, a retro clothing based company. A brick and mortar location for the business opened on January 8, 2013 in the Wicker Park area of Chicago east of Oak Park; however, it closed within a year.
