= List of American Pickers episodes =

This is a list of episodes of the American series American Pickers. The series premiered on January 18, 2010, on History.

As of January 15, 2025, 402 episodes of American Pickers have aired.

== Series overview ==
Season	Episodes	Originally released	
Season	Episodes	First released	Last released
1	12	January 18, 2010	April 5, 2010
2	13	June 7, 2010	October 11, 2010
3	13	December 6, 2010	April 11, 2011
4	12	June 1, 2011	September 26, 2011
5	13	November 28, 2011	March 5, 2012
6	10	April 9, 2012	July 9, 2012
7	12	August 13, 2012	December 17, 2012
8	9	January 14, 2013	March 11, 2013
9	12	May 27, 2013	August 19, 2013
10	12	October 9, 2013	December 18, 2013
11	15	January 8, 2014	June 11, 2014
12	14	July 30, 2014	December 17, 2014
13	24	January 14, 2015	September 9, 2015
14	19	October 14, 2015	March 2, 2016
15	12	May 4, 2016	August 2, 2016
16	17	October 3, 2016	January 30, 2017
17	11	April 10, 2017	July 24, 2017
18	13	October 16, 2017	March 12, 2018
19	23	April 9, 2018	November 26, 2018
20	24	January 21, 2019	September 9, 2019
21	21	October 21, 2019	August 3, 2020
22	23	January 25, 2021	September 6, 2021
23	20	January 1, 2022	September 17, 2022
24	18	January 4, 2023	August 23, 2023
25	15	December 27, 2023	March 27, 2024
26	14	October 9, 2024	January 15, 2025
27	21	July 2, 2025	April 12, 2026

== Episodes ==
=== Season 1 (2010) ===
No. overall	No. in season	Title	Original release date	Prod. code
1	1	"Big Bear"	January 18, 2010	1.01
Mike and Frank try to acquire a vintage carnival ride from a reluctant seller named Bear; 12-foot advertising sign of the iconic Philip Morris bellhop; World War II Japanese samurai sword; old saddle; in Northeast Iowa: signs (U.S. Royal, Skelly Oil Company), bicycle seat, Defiance lantern, rare Harley-Davidson bicycle crank, bicycle, and a Vespa scooter frame.
2	2	"Super Scooter"	January 25, 2010	1.02
Flying solo in Northern Iowa, Mike comes across the "Goat Man" and combs through his amazing, hidden-away property of junk-filled fields and buses. An Illinois couple's home proves to be a collector's paradise. The boys work on a prolific car collector who is reluctant to sell. Danielle uncovers a pricey, one-of-a-kind Vespa passenger scooter. And following their instincts, the guys meet a gracious 84-year-old woman who opens the doors to her untouched collections.
3	3	"White Castle On The Farm"	February 1, 2010	1.03
Mike and Frank spot a White Castle burger joint on an Ohio farmer's front lawn and discover his extraordinary collection of vintage buildings and vehicles. A promising Iowa home reportedly packed with antiques yields everything but. And the guys hit pay dirt when they visit a sprawling 880,000-square-foot former factory home.
4	4	"Invisible Pump"	February 8, 2010	1.04
Circa 1920s "visible" gas pump designed to allow drivers to see the grade of fuel being pumped into their cars. Mike and Frank visit an opera house built in 1879 that has become home to vintage movie posters. At another place they get a Japanese license plate, General Electric brass-blade table fan, and a cabinet.
5	5	"Back Breaker"	February 15, 2010	1.05
Mike has injured his back but cannot afford to take time off to recuperate; the guys make a big mistake while exploring a 92-year-old Iowa farmer's collection; the guys counsel a prolific collector from Ohio who is reluctant to part with a 1948 Rock-Ola jukebox.
6	6	"Mole Man"	March 1, 2010	1.06
Mike and Frank bet on who is the best picker while on the road in Pennsylvania, with the loser having to clean their smelly and filthy van; the guys meet "Mole Man" Ron, a picker with a mostly hand-built, 26-room underground lair.
7	7	"Frank's Gamble"	March 8, 2010	1.07
After the guys discover a basement full of vintage cars, Frank makes a big offer for a 1939 Plymouth; the guys find a mother lode of rare bikes and motorbikes in New Hampshire.
8	8	"5 Acres Of Junk"	March 15, 2010	1.08
Leaving Iowa in the dead of winter, Mike and Frank head south to New Orleans. There they stumble upon a quirky antique dealer name "Gringo Al" with a sprawling collection. But after digging through his treasure-filled outbuilding, they begin to wonder if he is ready to make a deal, finally getting a wide assortment. The guys meet a unique relic hunter whose collection includes dinosaur fossils, and then visit his quirky neighbor, a compulsive collector who is rarely in the mood to sell. But when Mike spots a pair of rare visible gas pumps, the picking game is on. With over 2,000 motorbikes and piles of twisted metal, Vic's automotive graveyard is a picker's paradise. And Danielle finds a local buyer who might make the day a total success.
9	9	"Bigfoot In Alabama"	March 29, 2010	1.09
While picking their way through the South, the guys meet up with John, a Mississippi motorcycle collector who has plenty of cool stuff, but his prices are through the roof. Then Mike spots a rare 1969 Kawasaki muscle bike. While in Alabama, Mike and Frank visit a prolific car hobbyist whose yard looks like a vintage parking lot. After driving down Poorhouse Road, they scour the bizarre collection at the Alabama Museum of Wonder where everything, including a gigantic head from a Piggly Wiggly mascot, is for sale. And finally, the guys catch a lucky break at a Birmingham vintage scooter shop.
10	10	"Know When To Fold"	March 29, 2010	1.10
The guys are running low on cash and desperate for a good pick in the South; a nostalgic owner is reluctant to part with his treasures but lets go a bunch of pottery; collection of rare automobiles where Mike picks up a Whiz Auto Parts sign; famous cartoonist Harold Gray's sketchbook; pottery collection found in Atlanta.
11	11	"Fill'er Up"	April 5, 2010	1.11
After a couple of days without a decent pick, Mike and Frank look up a Georgia collector who has a storage shed that is jam-packed with curios and movie memorabilia from his family's drive-in theater. Also, during record cold weather in rural Florida, the guys tour Wayne's awesome collection of vehicles but is anything for sale? And on a property full of tractors and signs, the guys scour a treasure-filled outbuilding that seems too good to be true then hatch a plan to get the owner to sell.
12	12	"Leland's Cafe"	April 5, 2010	1.12
Mike finds two rare bicycles (one is a turn-of-the-century wood rim bicycle and the other, an even rarer 1880s high-wheeler) after Danielle gets a sketchy lead about a collection owned by a reluctant seller; Mike and Frank come bearing a gift when they pay another visit to Leland.

=== Season 2 (2010) ===
No. overall	No. in season	Title	Original release date	Prod. code
13	1	"Art of the Deal"	June 7, 2010	2.01
Mike and Frank comb through a collector's buildings in North Carolina and find a 1950 Studebaker that Mike falls in love with. Mike then becomes obsessed with a 1934 pre-Airstream trailer and the negotiation becomes a classic in its own right. Hoping to sell a choice vintage sign, the guys pay a visit to friend and NASCAR champion Ryan Newman.
14	2	"Buddy's Booby Trap"	June 14, 2010	2.02
Mike and Frank find something they have never seen before while visiting a local legend named Buddy in North Carolina, what they think is a booby trap but turns out to be a device for testing car brakes. They also get a 1979 Ford Pinto award, André the Giant action figure, 1970s Donald Duck pull-string toy, movable staircase, Frank finds a gold mine of signs on a farm.
15	3	"Gordon's Gold Mine"	June 21, 2010	2.03
Mike and Frank find the holy grail of picking in Gordon's cement factory; the guys scour the inventory of a father-and-son picking duo; the guys meet Mary who has inherited a 300-acre property.
16	4	"Smooth Operators"	June 28, 2010	2.04
As the guys finish their trip through the South, Danielle finds them the mother lode of rare motorbike parts; an incredible discovery guaranteed to impress their friend and NASCAR champion Ryan Newman; an 11-acre property littered with racecars and outbuildings; back in Iowa, Mike and Frank have a field day scouring a collection of one of their decorator clients where they finds signs (OshKosh B'Gosh, Goat brand milk, Sealtek, Golden Sun Seeds, Renk Dealer, John Deere, and many more) and a phone booth.
17	5	"Getting The Boot"	July 5, 2010	2.05
In Kansas, the guys pick through a promising farmyard, but are frustrated when they find nothing to buy; a demolition expert ponders selling a rare grave marker and a giant boot; Junior's oilcan collection comes at a high price.
18	6	"Easy Riders"	July 26, 2010	2.06
Mike and Frank head towards an inherited old farm in Missouri with plenty of promise that delivers with a Schwinn Sting-Ray bicycle but the guys buy a block and tackle, coffee tin can, salt-glazed ceramic pot, scale model Volkswagen Beetle with a bar inside, John Bull train motion lamp, and several signs: 1960s Kawasaki dealership, Town Crier flour, rocking chair, and a Western Union self-winding clock. Danielle calls with news about an ultimate prize: a 1937 Harley Knucklehead at a Kansas man's collection of antiques in a 1920s Ford dealership that gives up an indented stop sign, Jeep dealership sign; in the El Dorado theatre the guys get a hula lamp, Victrola jigsaw puzzle, large Cholula Hot Sauce bottle, and a custom Kawasaki chopper. The guys get the Knucklehead appraised who, it turns out, had restored it in the 1980s. Freestyle picking at a "picking heaven" farm yields a Hopalong Cassidy lunch box full of valentines and saddles but the guys get a wooden medicine chest, railroad baggage cart, and a Knoll strap chair that Mike and the owner battle over with a Rock 'Em Sock 'Em Robots game.
19	7	"Psychic Pickings"	August 2, 2010	2.07
The guys stop in at Sam and Stan's steel yard where they go on a high-speed golf cart tour of a massive hangar and outbuildings; the team goes freestyling and comes across an old farm; the guys come across Greg, who claims he is a psychic picker.
20	8	"One Pony Town"	August 9, 2010	2.08
Lifelong picker and yard sale aficionado Lester is known by his neighbors as the spooky collector because of his taxidermy collection (where the guys get a beaver fur backpack, stuffed miniature horse, Gendron pedal car, fishing creel, wall clock, metal doll dresser, a large hotel arrow sign that was allegedly on Route 66, a Buddy L toy truck, ship lights, Texaco Motor Oil sign, "Funeral No Parking" sign); the guys visit a hard-core Illinois collector who says he wants to downsize but is not ready to sell; the guys pay a return visit to their picking mamma, Judy (from "White Castle", season 1 episode 3) and pick up a moving cart, table saw, locker, red leather chair, and steam trunk.
21	9	"Hobo Jack"	August 16, 2010	2.09
Danielle tells the guys they need to step up their game; Mike and Frank uncover lots of great stuff in retired chimney sweeper Tony's sprawling Illinois collection like a Marx Dick Tracy wind-up toy squad car, elk antlers, Keystone movie projector; Ken has room after room of unusual items where the guys get a ceramic jug and urn, early 19th century erotic photograph, low leather lounge chairs, Schwinn Excelsior bicycle; Danielle calls with a lead about Hobo Jack where the guys get a 1921 V-twin Indian motorcycle engine and transmission, an Excelsior motorcycle chassis and a cycle car motor that turned out to be a Curtiss V-twin beltdrive motorcycle engine.
22	10	"Laurel And Hardy"	September 6, 2010	2.10
In Kentucky, the guys visit a serious collector who is in the mood to sell a 1919 National Guard training machine gun, ozone generator, Kiss pinball machine, motor oil glass bottles, a cigarette machine that proves too difficult to remove from a school bus; large Sinclair Oil sign, 1947 Mills slot machine, and a 1920s Advance Machine Company electric shock strength tester. At the geodesic dome home of biker couple, a speed pick yields a Bausch & Lomb spotting telescope, New Era rope twister, a vintage steam-powered popcorn machine. The guys visit two retirees who live in a former honky-tonk spot that uncovers a wooden juggling club, Günthermann Charlie Chaplin wind-up toy figure, lighter, Slush Puppie poster, Philco Predicta television, Honey-Krust bread door pushes, and large Laurel and Hardy masks. Frank and Mike interview Danielle about her raise.
23	11	"Frank Flips"	September 13, 2010	2.11
The guys pick the storage locker of a fellow picker named 2D; Mike and Frank visit a woman who hopes to clear out some of her late father's collection; at a Wisconsin farm the guys get caught up in the weird world of Hippie Tom.
24	12	"Mike's Breakdown"	October 4, 2010	2.12
Mike dives into an amazing Grand Haven, Michigan collection but Frank seems to have lost his picking mojo yet, after being let down by an already sold 1965 Honda Scrambler motorcycle, and other items, get a Brillié electric wall clock, lantern, puzzles and board games (Milton Bradley Game of India), plastic toy robot, Curtis Industries and Ilco key signs, Super Coola soda cans, Cobra toy hovercar, magazines (Dennis the Menace, Mad, etc), and Golding Pearl printing press. The guys visit a Wisconsin property (Symco Union Thresherman's Village) that features a reconstituted vintage town that gives a leaded glass panel, Sunray "D-X" sign, and a liquor store neon sign. Frank senses engine trouble with the van while Mike ignores the signs. Meanwhile, at "The Mall Mart", a former gas station in a small Wisconsin town, the guys find a mancave and pick up some grey alien rubber figure props from the TV show Roswell, a Goodyear sign, Victorinox Swiss Army knife electric moving display, a Williams "Spitfire" pinball machine (which Mike arm wrestles the owner over, but loses), Western Auto sign, and Top Value Stamps sign. Sure enough, the van breaks down and the guys get a tow from Mike's brother.
25	13	"Pint-Sized Picker"	October 11, 2010	2.13
Mike's nephew Rhesa tags along on a hunt back at Danny Bean's place where they see a White Owl Cigar advertising owl-shaped sign, but get Harley-Davidson hats, a front hollow-wheel eclipse bicycle wheel, Harley-Davidson oil can, Remington Chain Saws Cornick Supply Co. sign, tarpon-shaped sign, 1890s cast iron drafting table, bull horns, and a Blazon rocking horse. Later, after a ferry ride across Lake Michigan, the guys visit Tim's 10,000-square-foot place and find an Empire State Building cigarette machine, soap box derby car, but buy a 1952 Vespa scooter, Foodliner porcelain letters, and Brunswick wind-up phonograph model 117. Then, at a 14-bedroom late-1800s home and barn once owned by famous opera singer Marie Rappold, yields an ornate floor lamp, mouse trap, lighthouse wind direction indicator folk art, New York area pennants, Presco Manufacturing contact printer.

=== Season 3 (2010–11) ===
No. overall	No. in season	Title	Original release date	Prod. code
26	1	"A Banner Pick"	December 6, 2010	3.01
A trip to Pennsylvania has the men exploring Bushkill Park in Easton, where they find vintage sideshow banners by Fred G. Johnson. Also, a trip to New York City includes a Staten Island storage unit filled with carnival memorabilia.
27	2	"Danielle Goes Picking"	December 13, 2010	3.02
The guys take Danielle out on a pick, and she explores the barn of a collector; and later Mike takes Danielle out picking at a vacant hotel in Pennsylvania while Frank holds down the fort.
28	3	"What's In The Box?"	December 20, 2010	3.03
The men go to New York to see a collection of vintage cars stored in a train station; visit a New Hampshire couple whose collection includes retro arcade games; and attend an auction in Rhode Island, where Frank buys vintage toy trucks.
29	4	"Fairlane Fever"	December 27, 2010	3.04
Mike and Frank challenge Danielle to sell a vintage carnival ride they have been storing for months. Meanwhile, the guys visit a collector with amazing pieces including an old gambling game used to get customers to spend more money. Later, the guys pick the International Clown Hall of Fame, where they find an amazing miniature automated carnival. And finally, after seeing at a Yamaha dirt bike for sale on a front lawn, retired mechanic Norm opens his garage to reveal a smoking-hot, 1967 Ford Fairlane muscle car.
30	5	"Too Hot To Handle"	January 17, 2011	3.05
In upstate New York, the guys stop in at a sprawling treasure-laden farm with fourteen jam-packed trailers, the result of a lifetime of collecting by the late owner. His daughter needs to sell some of his things to help save the farm. Later, an eccentric mother-daughter duo sells their extraordinary 1856 home, an Underground Railroad site, and everything in it. Finally, the guys visit an old cheese factory that has been boarded up for years, and the local fire department must break down the doors to get to the hot items.
31	6	"Trading Up"	January 24, 2011	3.06
Mike and Frank head to Ohio and decide to make the trip a little more interesting by bringing along a cup dispenser from an old train station to trade with their clients hoping to make some cash. They meet Will, the son of an auctioneer who has inherited a house packed with his dad's collection and is coming to terms with letting the stuff go. The guys pick up tons of items, Harley-Davidson helmet, 1975 Batman Mobile Bat Lab Volkswagen toy van, an antique M. Hohner accordion on which Frank shows off his musical talents, chalkware figurines of Uncle Sam and a soldier boy, late-1950s Jayne Mansfield water bottle, various wobble toys, and a Philco Predicta TV. Next, they truck to Indiana to meet a small town historian who takes everyone's collectibles for safe keeping. There, they purchase a St. Louis Cardinals vintage baseball Beech-Nut Chewing Tobacco poster featuring Dizzy and Paul Dean, Dog n Suds fake rubber food drive-in window tray, handcranked organette music box, and Frank falls in love with a 1976 pinball machine featuring Happy Days' The Fonz, various smalls, and a saxophone (which Mike tries, and fails, to trade the Predicta TV for). Finally, Mike gets to experience his dream pick at a VW graveyard in Illinois where he gets a VW hood emblem, but Frank is the one who strikes gold when he buys a rare BSA motorcycle, a VW bus vinyl record player, sales tax tokens (which Mike finally trades the Predicta for).
32	7	"The Emu Chase"	January 31, 2011	3.07
Mike and Frank find themselves in a high-risk situation when they are chased by a crazy emu who roams a farm in Kentucky that the boys are picking. Once they have escaped from the bird they manage to rescue a much sought after fireplace facade. Danielle sends the guys to Frank Wolfe, who gives them a golden lead to a guy called Jerry Lotz, where Mike buys a Schwinn auto-cycle bike for a $1,000 and Frank leaves with two rare BB guns. The guys finish up their trip by surprising an old friend of Mike's, Ruby Guidara, a famous Nashville set designer. They purchase an old dentist chair from her that Mike thinks would be perfect in a Lady Gaga video, but when they take the chair to an appraiser they hear some surprising information.
33	8	"Keep Out!"	February 7, 2011	3.08
Driving along the back roads of Tennessee in the early morning fog, Mike and Frank are brushing up on their Southern expressions when they spot an awesome property. Once they muster up the courage to ignore the scary "no trespassing" signs, the homeowner opens up his amazing collection of incredible "mantiques" like a Texaco Fire-Chief gas pump, Dukes of Hazzard trash can and TV tray, Kiekhaefer Mercury outboard motor sign, Exercycle stationary bike, PET Ice Cream sign, and a "US" belt buckle with a bullet lodged in it. Later, with four barns that are packed to the rafters, a Smoky Mountain property looks perfect. But Mike and Frank's perfect day quickly goes downhill when the collector Randy cannot bear to part with anything. Can they break the ice or will their picking spirit be broken first? Eventually, after being denied a Morrow bicycle parts cabinet, Batman soap bottles, and some other small items, eventually Randy cracks on a Ford Tractors neon and regular Ford dealership signs. And thanks to a lead from Danielle, the guys get a warm welcome from Joe, a lifetime picker whose staggering collection spans over 30 buildings that yields an A&J wall clock, a box of small items including a Planet of the Apes thermos bottle (which Mike finds the lunchbox to later) and a 1950s toy car, a lamp with an acrylic-painted lampshade, and a Moto-Scoot scooter.
34	9	"They Boldly Go"	February 14, 2011	3.09
Mike and Frank are out in Kentucky on a different kind of mission. They are going to someone who needs their expertise to make his home unique. The owner is William Shatner, who gives Mike and Frank a very specific list. While Danielle looks for leads, the picking is red hot at Thurman's Tennessee hills property. The lifetime collector says he is ready to make a deal, but is he really? Next, the guys hunt for the perfect showpiece for Shatner's garden and think they have hit the jackpot with an amazing millstone collector. That is, until they find out his prices outweigh even the heaviest of stones. And with just one week to deliver the goods to their celebrity client, Mike and Frank call in a favor from a designer friend. Finally, with a van full of treasures, they deliver their booty to Shatner, hoping they have not let him down.
35	10	"The Possum Trot"	March 21, 2011	3.10
While cruising through South Carolina, looking for leads, the guys call an old picking contact and soon find themselves in Bill's main street hardware store. The family business has been operating since the 1880s and is filled to the rafters with century-old inventory. In the backwoods of Alabama, the guys are invited to the "Possum Trot" ? a down-home country auction where the bidding is intense, and the guys try to auction a few of their items. Later, Ed's Georgia property features a missile on the lawn, and building after building of awesome stuff. And for the first time, he says he is ready to part with a few of his treasures! Mike spies a must-have German leather pilot's helmet and a rare ship's compass. And after scoring an entire shelf of brand new vintage model car kits, Frank discovers the real challenge is getting a giant Victrola banner down from the rafters.
36	11	"California Dreamin'"	March 28, 2011	3.11
Cruising along the California coastline, the guys know they are in for something big. Mil Blair founded the iconic motorcycle magazine Easyriders, and for the first time ever, the legend is willing to sell some of his rare collections of motorbikes and memorabilia. Later, the guys visit Bird's temple of surfing. Although he does not normally sell, the guys convince him to part with a few choice surfboards. Also, the guys visit Alfie in the Malibu Hills. His eclectic collection includes over a half million albums and a real bombshell. And finally, they get their new surfboards appraised at the California Surf Museum and make a generous donation.
37	12	"Frank's Big Shot"	April 4, 2011	3.12
The guys are dreaming of a California mega score when they stumble upon a salvage yard that has been in a family for generations. The place looks promising... but the owner has never let anyone inside. Can Frank and Mike talk their way in? Later, Mike eyes a rare brass diving helmet that comes with a high price tag. Frank zeros in on a rare car hood ornament that he gets appraised. And finally, a stop at a Mexican restaurant leads to a Wild West-style picking opportunity that ends up on the basketball court with Frank, a.k.a. "the Free Throw King."
38	13	"NASCAR Challenge"	April 11, 2011	3.13
Mike and Frank get revved up about an awesome new client: North Carolina's NASCAR Hall of Fame. The curators have asked them to scour the country for relics that help tell the unique history of auto racing. But with their limited budget, they are under even more pressure to deliver. Their first stop is Tiger Tom's auto shop. The veteran racer's collection dates back over half a century and includes must-have items that changed the face of racing. Also in this episode: "Humpy" Wheeler is the former president of the Charlotte Motor Speedway, and although his attic is a gold mine, getting him to part with any of his treasures takes serious charm and a charitable strategy. Later, Billy Biscoe was in the pit crew of a NASCAR champion and has a collection of jaw-dropping artifacts that is as impressive as his stories. And picking takes a back seat when Mike and Frank climb into a pair of vintage race cars for a drag race showdown.

=== Season 4 (2011) ===
No. overall	No. in season	Title	Original release date	Prod. code
39	1	"Civil War Pickings"	June 1, 2011	4.01
The guys are on an assignment that is 150 years in the making. The Gettysburg Museum in Gettysburg, Pennsylvania, asks Mike and Frank to help expand its collection by hunting down some hard-to-find Civil War items. It is a daunting task made even harder with a limited budget. Danielle gets things rolling when she sends them to a previous customer who is a Civil War buff where Frank scores a Spencer Carbine. They next visit a collector, Keith, who does not want to sell, but they convince him to loan a rare Dog River Confederate sword to the museum. They also buy a Springfield musket and canteen. But their picking skills are put to the test when they spot a Union frock coat that is at the top of the museum's wish list, but can they negotiate a sale and keep within the museum's tight budget? In addition, the guys experience a Civil War adventure when they sign up with a local re-enactment group. As captains on opposite sides, they go into battle leading their respective troops.
40	2	"An Indian Reunion"	June 6, 2011	4.02
In Florida, Mike and Frank visit a hangar-sized barn full of treasures, owned by a couple of junkyard junkies who have been picking since 1948. An awesome circus property turned animal preserve features lions, tigers, and bears among circus paraphernalia and a mysterious locked trunk. And while freestyling, the guys come to a screeching halt after spotting a zebra-striped vintage motorbike in a yard. The collection is an Indian's dream. A major score leads to an unlikely reunion at a vintage motorbike museum.
41	3	"Airstream Dream"	June 13, 2011	4.03
On their first-ever trip through Arizona, the guys tap into their spirit animals to track down a lifetime picker whose property is packed with killer stuff. A real-deal cowboy with a serious poker face, Fargo's Wild West ranch is like stepping back in time. And while picking behind a remote strip mall, a bizarre totem pole catches Mike's eye, but it is an original Airstream trailer that renders him speechless. Also among items picked is an old neon sign from a coffee shop which John Wayne frequented.
42	4	"The Pick, The Pawn, And The Polish"	July 11, 2011	4.04
Mike and Frank are in Arizona on a picking mission when they receive a call from Rick Harrison of Pawn Stars, requesting that they try to find a 1957 Chevrolet for the Old Man's birthday present. But the trouble is that, if you know what you are looking for, it is hard to find. Rick Dale from American Restoration also guest stars. (This episode began a two-hour crossover event that continued on American Restoration and Pawn Stars.)
43	5	"Pandoras Box"	July 18, 2011	4.05
Mike and Frank are cruising around Daytona Beach, and while the sun is shining outside, the van reeks and the hunt is on to find out why. The guys stumble onto a street lined with abandoned businesses and fall head over heels for a girly neon bar sign. Barbara's bayou property is a pickers' paradise. Plus, Randy's suburban home is packed to the rafters with rare collectibles. But when the guys get a load of his prices, it is time to pull out all the stops.
44	6	"Frank Bears All"	July 25, 2011	4.06
Mike and Frank are picking their way through Florida when they get a lead on a potential gold mine – a five-acre property that is an automotive graveyard where they get signs, a calendar, and a scale model Atlanta-class light cruiser naval trench art. The guys also visit an off-the-grid hangar-sized geodesic dome home of Sidecar Willy, where they discover two gems: a very rare piece of rock 'n' roll history and an unusual 1959 Watsonian Squire motorcycle sidecar, as well as NASA mission patches, The Beatles Yesterday and Today album cover and other Beatles memorabilia. Mike's hunger for seafood lands them a chance pick where they get a police helmet, armband, and belt, brass explosion-proof lights, stained glass windows, Penn Reels fishing reels, slot machines, taxidermy bears, a sci-fi movie prop "hero weapon" used by Vin Diesel in the film The Chronicles of Riddick, and a slot machine.
45	7	"Pinball Mania"	August 1, 2011	4.07
The guys head to the Lone Star State, hoping to uncover a Texas-size honey hole. Once there, Mike and Frank dig through a huge outbuilding filled with dead coin-operated games (in the dark because the electricity was out). While they make an offer on a few rare gems, the owner struggles to let go of his grandpa's merchandise and all the memories that go with them. He steers the boys to a hangar-sized warehouse down the street where the guys discover the mother-lode of pop culture pinball machines. They end up at John's jaw-dropping collection of rare motorcycles, bikes, and even rarer parts. At first the guys go into overdrive, but when they realize nothing is for sale, Mike switches gears and comes up with a plan!
46	8	"Frank's Pacemaker"	August 8, 2011	4.08
Thousands of miles from home, the guys are scouring the back roads of Texas desperate to find the big-ticket item that will make the long trip worthwhile. Just like his late father, Aardean is a funeral director who never throws anything away. And with everything from neon crucifixes to an embalming table with an incredible history, the guys are dying to dive in! On a mission to preserve the history of the telephone, Don's jaw-dropping personal museum includes over 200,000 rare items. Featuring room after room of vintage signs, toys, and mantiques, Susan's suburban home is packed to the rafters with Americana. The good news is she is downsizing and everything is for sale, but the bad news is the guys still have not found that big-ticket item. After touring Cecil's awesome vintage car collection, the guys get access to his "toy box." Making a series of great deals, Mike leaves Frank in the dust. That is, until the "bearded charmer" spots a rare scooter and makes his move.
47	9	"Urban Cowboys"	September 5, 2011	4.09
Looking for picks in Texas, the guys see a sign for Gilley's Club, the honky-tonk club made famous in the 1980 film Urban Cowboy. Soon they are face-to-face with country music superstar Mickey Gilley himself who has a warehouse jam-packed with rare Gilley's memorabilia like a poster, neon beer sign, beer cans, mudflaps, mugs, and snakeskin cowboy boots. Later, Paul's sprawling junkyard features a staggering amount of stuff. His grandson Pride takes the guys on an adventure, and when it comes to negotiating, young Pride proves he is tough but the guys get a galvanized metal toy boat folk art, 1924 cast-iron Frick icehouse gauges, Dick Tracy doll head, marching band hat, Welton beaver pelt top hat. Gilley steers the guys north to a peanut factory where Jim has preserved all the big-ticket items from Gilley's including a mechanical bull. But when Frank gets a load of the bar's original grand piano played by many a music legend, a potential deal is music to his ears! The guys get a cash register drawer, Coca-Cola bottles, Texas Pacific Gasoline sign, and the original Gilley's entrance sign.
48	10	"Automotive Archaeology"	September 12, 2011	4.10
The shop is busting at the seams so Mike and Frank task Danielle with getting a bid to expand the building while the guys head to Michigan hoping to strike automotive gold in the heart of the America's car capital. Clearing the contents of derelict storage lockers, Brian's sprawling auction house is a picker's playground where Mike and Frank get junk drunk as they dig deep and get a Hubley cast-iron motorcycle sidecar toy, Pabst blue ribbon ceramic beer bottle display, Bolex video camera, Detroit Lions bobblehead, Star Wars C-3PO scale model, Detroit Tigers figure, Vindex cast-iron bulldog electric cigarette lighter, and matchbooks. The guys next meet Jim's awesome collection of original automotive advertising art that yields a Honda 450 motorcycle painting, a battery-operated scale model of the Uniroyal Giant Tire Ferris wheel, Syd Mead concept car paintings, and a folk art tractor. And Tony wants to thin out his collection of old car and gas station memorabilia. Hoping for a lottery-style return, Mike and Frank battle it out for a collection of motometers before uncovering two items, each with a jaw-dropping pedigree, a Charles Lindberg coat and a 1908 Oldsmobile-manufactured leather license plate which Mike makes a sweet deal on with the curator of the R. E. Olds Transportation Museum to ensure that the rare piece of car history finds a permanent place of honor.
49	11	"Motor City"	September 19, 2011	4.11
Driving through Michigan in a freak spring snowstorm, the team's prospects look bleak until they spot an interesting old Cadillac for sale. With their picking senses twitching, they stop to see what else is on the property. Frank falls hard for a deluxe Ford Model A roadster. But to seal the deal, he has got to talk to the boss and she is not at home! Passionate about revitalizing Detroit's city core, Joel Landy owns an entire Detroit neighborhood of 50 adjoining properties, including a 50,000-square-foot warehouse that is jam-packed with cool cars, old signs, and architectural salvage. It is a picker's dream and the guys dig deep to see what they can uncover, finding a United Motors Service sign, cast-iron pedestal tables, Kawasaki Triple 500 motorcycle, Bosch horn sign, outboard motor, chair, stained glass windows, 1960s sphere loudspeakers. Collecting on a monumental scale, father and son duo Jerry and Jerry's 40-acre property includes a life-size model train town and over 1,000 classic bicycles. The only problem is they have got a hard time selling and their prices are frozen in time! After dropping thousands of dollars on the Model A, Frank faces the appraiser's verdict.
50	12	"8th Grade Humor"	September 26, 2011	4.12
Determined to uncover a hidden honey hole, the guys are freestyling on their home turf in Iowa. And to keep himself entertained, prankster Frank has a few practical jokes up his sleeve. After the boys spot a rusty toy museum sign, lifetime collector George opens the doors to his heavenly collection. A former church-turned-personal showcase, the shelves are overflowing with vintage toys and George is in the mood to sell. The bearded charmer works his magic and the guys soon find themselves picking with a local history buff. As a fire marshal, John empties abandoned houses before burning them down! He has filled several outbuildings with salvaged treasures. Mike spots an item so unusual he is willing to take a huge gamble. In Des Moines, auction-addict Roger has a 3,000-square-foot mega-pick that is jam-packed with treasure that he is finally willing to sell.

=== Season 5 (2011–12) ===
No. overall	No. in season	Title	Original release date	Prod. code
51	1	"Jurassic Pick"	November 28, 2011	5.01
In Mississippi, Mike and Frank find what turns out to be a priceless, 65-million-year-old dinosaur bone. It is appraised by the curator of the Mississippi Museum of Natural Science. Next, they find a 1960s Zündapp Bella German scooter judged among the best on the market at the time, and an antique wire recorder, the predecessor to the reel to reel tape recorder. Danielle searches for a 2nd location
52	2	"Not So Cheap Thrills"	December 5, 2011	5.02
Mike and Frank are freestyling in Minnesota where they stumble on salvage operator Terry who has a staggering scrap yard. Everything is for sale, including a mother lode of retro signage. Next, coin-op kings Gary and John "say" they are ready to sell some of their vast collection of vintage arcade games. Frank takes a major gamble on some old school peep show coin-operated machines. And retired twin brothers Steve and Tom open up their massive collection of toy cars and trucks. Danielle gets an appraisal on the peep show item.
53	3	"Pickin' Perry-dise"	December 12, 2011	5.03
Looking for roadside relics in West Virginia, the guys pick an Appalachian village museum where Mike ups the ante to score a rare retro motor. The museum's octogenarian owners, The Perrys, have never sold anything before, and after sealing the deal on an odd electric peacock, Mike makes his move. In Nashville, Danielle is unimpressed with the pool of quirky candidates she has met to manage the new store. Dave's Ohio storefront is filled with cool bikes and scooters but his business plan is more show than sell. With every room packed to the gills, a father-and-son duo open the doors to their staggering collection where the guys find a giant Goliath head that bears a strange resemblance to Frank.
54	4	"The Mad Catter"	December 19, 2011	5.04
Hoping to score big on the East Coast, Mike and Frank make stops in Virginia, Washington DC, and Maryland, and are delirious when they find themselves waist-deep in a treasure-packed machine shop. Harry's property is wired for maximum security and once the guys gain access to his amazing vault, Mike makes a high-stakes gamble. Driving off the beaten path, the guys run across a quirky artist with a wacky sense of humor and a sprawling Virginia property packed with funky collectibles. After wading through building after building, Mike pounces on a one-of-a-kind feline with an impressive pedigree. Featuring the mother lode of petroliana, Mike and Frank scour a defunct Maryland oil company where everything is for sale. Tim is hoping to make some money to revive a vintage local beer and the guys are determined to help him clear out some of his unique mint-condition inventory.
55	5	"Fast Eddie"	December 26, 2011	5.05
While Mike and Frank pick the back roads of Minnesota, they challenge Danielle to sell a ten-foot fiberglass cowboy boot that has been gathering dust for over a year. After a lifetime in the demolition business, Fast Eddie has tons of unusual oversize treasures like a McCormick-Deering hit-and-miss engine. A great lead gives the guys first crack at a treasure-packed farmyard estate sale where they get a Studebaker tail light, pressed steel model airplane, 1950s toy Marx tommy gun, and a wedding photo. Ted's garage is filled with awesome mantiques and Mike goes into overdrive when he climbs into the rafters and discovers a honey hole of rare bicycles and gets a Chevy car grill, car club plaque, mid-1890s Clipper shaft bicycle, Monark Firestone Super Cruiser, and Frank gets a Land-O-Nod Mattresses neon clock, Whizzer motorized bike).
56	6	"What Happens In Sturgis..."	January 2, 2012	5.06
Danielle turns up a good lead she has been working on for months. When Mike tells Frank to pack up for a trip to South Dakota, Frank says he cannot. He is secretly going to his 30th annual trip to the legendary Sturgis motorcycle rally, but says he will cover the shop. So Mike takes Danielle, first to Dollar Dick's, a tough-minded auction aficionado whose yard is covered in rusty gold like a gun holster, antique clock, horse weathervane, half of a Goodyear Tire sign, and a Fisk Tire sign. Next, they happen upon what looks like a tourist trap, but the 1880s ghost town pays off with a speed pick in a pair of treasure-filled silos that turns up some unusual items like an antique camera, 1891 photo albums, 1950 carhop trays, United States Cavalry feed box, suitcase, statue, wood stove, Cracker Jack Sailor Jack vending machine. Finally, they get to Dave's amazing automotive collection where Mike spies a sexy belly tank cycle car with classic Hollywood history from the film The Big Wheel that has a 1940 Indian motorcycle engine. They also get a Philco radio, Packard and Pontiac hood ornaments, and a Minnie Mouse dancing doll.
57	7	"The Elephant In The Room"	January 9, 2012	5.07
With a Noah's ark of exotic animals, the guys visit a Maine taxidermist where Mike gambles big money on a huge elephant head. Danielle's search for a pachyderm-loving buyer leads to alternative rock musician Jack White. Building collector Bill loves a good joke but his prices are no laughing matter. George's New Hampshire marine features great prices, even better stories, and everything from maritime collectibles to a bejeweled antique hotdog steamer. White is a collector himself. He is a tough bargainer with a couple of items to trade up his sleeve.
58	8	"Picker Man Blues"	January 16, 2012	5.08
Mike deals with an unmotivated seller in Tennessee named Tricky Dick where they get a Studebaker car jack, aluminum horse and jockey cutout off an arcade game or gambling device, and a coin-operated metal wild boar "Porky" kiddie ride with a case of beer. Mike and Frank visit a Clarksdale, Mississippi museum in the former WROX AM radio studio steeped in music history where they get two antique bird cages, porcelain service station light fixtures, shirt display stands, 1950s Williams Times Square pinball machine, and an Ingo bike. Also, the guys revisit Phil where they get tough negotiations over salvaged gems but still manage to get Uncle Sam and other United States Armed Forces recruiting cards, 1950s water skiing bathing suit woman sign from a motel, Pontiac Indian head hood ornament, "Nature's Remedy" laxative sign, a wooden wheel, fire buckets, cymbal-banging monkey toys, cigar box tops, and hay carriers/trolleys.
59	9	"Frank's Dog Days"	January 23, 2012	5.09
Since opening his second store, Mike is feeling serious pressure to fill up the van. He gets lucky while freestyling in Virginia with Danielle while Frank stays at the shop to try and sell his Plymouth (but gets stuck dogsitting his mom's Yorkshire Terriers). A cold call with Gary pays off with a Wayne Atlantic clock-faced gas pump, a pink 1958 100-selection AMI jukebox, and the remains (frame and fork) of a rare 1930s Indian Chief motorcycle. Henry's trailer homes are packed to the gills with unusual collectibles and he is ready to make a deal as he lets go of Gulflex porcelain lettering from a local Chrysler dealership, an antique toolbox with spikes on it catches Danielle's eye, an old football helmet, table fans, a frog doorstop, Douglas Battery "Best by Test" sign, Columbian rope cutter, and a Coca-Cola sign with "Eastside Cycle Club" that was on an old gas station used as an African-American motorcycle club clubhouse. Danielle proves she has got a picker's eye. While he proves to be a tough negotiator, Doug's well-manicured property is a honey hole of petroliana, yielding Amoco and American Gas canvas banners by Norman Rockwell, coveralls, pants, gloves, leggings, miscellaneous Amoco items (hat, nametag shirt pin, spark plugs, brochures, stickers, and a 1934 desk/countertop calendar), a Gould Batteries display stand, lighting, Amoco signs and a thermometer, Coca-Cola "button" sign, and Mobil signs. Back at the shop, Frank has a tough time tracking down an appraiser for the jukebox.
60	10	"Odd Fellas"	January 30, 2012	5.10
Frank goes wild in Joe's garage. It is packed with vintage motorcycles and while Frank scores deal after deal, Mike's efforts sputter and stall. With his family hit hard by the recession, a prolific collector is eager to sell. The guys scour building after building but sometimes one man's junk is just junk. While Frank gets ready to go to his high school reunion and show off his restored Plymouth, Mike and Danielle visit a Virginia property that turns out to be a mega-pick. With jam-packed buildings and trailers, Bill's sprawling collection features Odd Fellows relics and a vintage guitar that may be worth a fortune.
61	11	"When Horses Fly"	February 20, 2012	5.11
Burning up the back roads of South Dakota, Mike and Frank get off to a great start in Jim's spectacular man-cave. But when he slams on the brakes, they switch gears to score a heavenly sign. Freestyling in Iowa, the guys take a chance at an old airport turned auto body shop where a retro car takes them back to the future. Packed with roadside relics, Norm's property features a jaw-dropping collection of vintage pedal cars but the guys soon discover he drives a hard bargain.
62	12	"Knuckleheads"	February 27, 2012	5.12
With a sprawling warehouse and overstuffed semi trailers, Kevin's New England property is a gold mine where Mike makes off with the Michelin man and then gambles on a rare collection of vintage pilot gear. A former racecar driver with an amazing collection of automotive artifacts, Big Bad Jess is a serious collector who says he is ready to sell. In Maine, Jim's barn is a sprawling Harley-Davidson honey hole where the guys are tested with a mystery part that could save them some coin.
63	13	"The Belly Dance"	March 5, 2012	5.13
Automotive aficionado Dale gets seriously cranked up over Mike's one-of-a-kind belly tank racer. But the negotiations could crash if the classic cannot run leaving Mike out thousands of dollars. Freestyling in New Hampshire, Tommy's treasure-packed barn yields some incredible railroad relics. Mario loves his junk but says he is willing to negotiate, and after gambling on a very cool retro smoking toy, bundle-master Frank steps in to save the day for Mike. Bruce's jam-packed property is staggering and though he is reluctant to sell, Mike manages to pull the trigger on a rare folk art rifle.

=== Season 6 (2012) ===
No. overall	No. in season	Title	Original release date	Prod. code
64	1	"Boys' Toys"	April 9, 2012	6.01
With his wife by his side, a self-confessed Tennessee hoarder is motivated to clear out his jam-packed log cabin home, and the showstopper is a 1947 Harley Knucklehead. When a restoration junkie's gas pumps are off-limits, Mike changes gears and sets his sights on a horse. A robot collector's sci-fi man cave yields a mint-condition astronaut toy but the cost could be other-worldly. Mike and Frank get VIP access to former antique store owner Billy's ten storage buildings, some that have not been opened in this century.
65	2	"The Return Of Hobo Jack"	April 16, 2012	6.02
The guys make a return visit to fan favorite Hobo Jack's sprawling forest sanctuary in Illinois. But wading through his "junkalanche" proves easier than making a deal. In Chicago, the guys search for a big-ticket item as they scour a mammoth warehouse stacked floor to ceiling with stuff. Meanwhile, back at the shop, Danielle lines up an appraiser for a one-of-a-kind art cat whose ratty appearance is at odds with its staggering price tag. And along the Illinois back roads, Mike and Frank stumble on a former Dairy Queen turned pickers' paradise.
66	3	"Mike's Holy Grail"	April 23, 2012	6.03
While cruising the back roads of North Carolina, the guys get a somewhat vague lead on the holy grail of motorbikes. The XAVW is a legendary masterpiece because of its detailing and unique components. Mike is determined to find it and puts pressure on Danielle to track it down. In addition, in Betty's sprawling warehouses, filled with a variety of stuff, the guys uncover everything from architectural salvage to an amazing military artifact. Also, Dale has an awesome junkyard and a noble cause. After gambling on a collection of American Indian artifacts, Frank gets some jaw-dropping news from the appraiser.
67	4	"Feudin' Pickers"	May 21, 2012	6.04
The guys discover Hatfield artifacts in West Virginia. Other finds include toy planes, a go-cart, and a frame and motor of a vintage Harley-Davidson motorcycle.
68	5	"Duck, Duck Moose"	June 4, 2012	6.05
Mike and Frank think they have hit the lottery with Dick's North Carolina warehouse which is jam-packed with quality stuff but his prices are through the roof. The bearded charmer steps in to save a deal on a rare kid's ride, and Mike discovers unique brass-era car parts that could be worth a bundle. With an entire town he built himself, Charlie's "Mooseville" features folk-art, rock bottom prices, and a surprising hidden gem... a mineshaft that leads to an underground saloon. And in Beno's motorcycle workshop, the awesome racing stories are trumped by his meticulous collection of vintage Indian motorbikes and accessories.
69	6	"Driving Miss Dani"	June 11, 2012	6.06
Gene's 17-acre North Carolina property is like an open-air museum where the guys start searching for smaller items they can actually move. An estate sale junkie and former preacher who is ready to downsize, Pastor Cecil opens the doors to his unusual clock-filled home, ready to make a deal. Digging through an avalanche of stuff, the guys scour a 500,000-square-foot warehouse to uncover some sideshow relics and a seriously compact company car for Danielle.
70	7	"Mama Knows Best"	June 18, 2012	6.07
Cruising the back roads of South Carolina, the guys stumble on an out-of-the-way property where an atomic-era spaceship clock catches Mike's eye. Crisscrossing the country for the past 30 years, long haul truckers Hollis and Linda have amassed an incredible collection and it is all stored behind their full-service laundromat. Junk Man Bob has a huge collection and is ready to sell but does his stuff live up to his name?
71	8	"Love 'Em And Leave 'Em"	June 25, 2012	6.08
A former Georgia boxer fights to keep a lifetime of stockpiled stuff that has his wife fed up. After scouring their 5-acre property, the guys make off with a band's worth of brass instruments and a surprisingly rare art deco fan. Freestyling in South Carolina, the guys visit a Volkswagen graveyard where Mike offers top dollar for a rusted out skeletal van. With barbed wire and no trespassing signs, the guys gain access to Tommy's Fort Knox of junk where they uncover a goldmine of rare collectibles.
72	9	"You Betcha"	July 2, 2012	6.09
With a massive property and a motivated seller, the guys pick Kentucky's Pioneer Playhouse where a mysterious wooden box captures Mike's attention. Frank is sure it is a magic box but Mike disagrees, leading to a serious wager. With rusty gold as far as the eye can see, Pete reveals his most valuable items are buried underground. And a random stop at a South Carolina service station pays off with a rare oil sign and a 1950s zombie relic. Later, an appraiser identifies the mystery box.
73	10	"Backroad Samurai"	July 9, 2012	6.10
To escape the BP oil spill, Tom moved his family and considerable collection to a motel in North Carolina. Each room in stuffed and he is ready to sell so he can renovate. The guys flip for his Indian motorcycle collection and Frank gambles on a pricey samurai artifact. They visit a former Harley-Davidson dealership, and they discover a South Carolina spot that leads to Gerald's awesome one-man town. Packed with petroliana, it is a picker's paradise and he is ready to make a deal. And Frank finds out about the samurai uniform he bought.

=== Season 7 (2012) ===
No. overall	No. in season	Title	Original release date	Prod. code
74	1	"Train Wreck"	August 13, 2012	7.01
Mike and Frank pick in a house that is stacked to the ceiling with rare toys. Mike adds to his King Kong collection while Frank drops a bundle on a rare train set. Later, when its value fails to impress, the guys decide to take a huge risk and sell it at auction.
75	2	"Where's Aldo?"	August 20, 2012	7.02
In Pennsylvania, Mike and Frank pick in some unique places including a funeral home and a prosthetic limb factory. They unearth mega collections but all the owners are reluctant to sell. The two pickers eventually run into a reclusive man named Aldo who grants them access to his mind-blowing stockpile of like-new vintage toys.
76	3	"Pickers In The Attic"	August 27, 2012	7.03
At a folk art museum, Mike and Frank discover an attic and two barns that are overflowing with one-of-a-kind pieces. Danielle takes a quick vacation to New York City but finds it impossible to relax due to Mike's incessant phone calls from the road.
77	4	"Guys and Dollhouses"	September 3, 2012	7.04
The Pickers visit Tom whose amazing collection of architectural salvage includes a vintage theater marquee and rare opera house relics. Later, they spend time at a sprawling South Carolina warehouse where Mike gets in a heated negotiation over a Victorian doll house.
78	5	"Guitars, Guns, And Gears"	October 21, 2012	7.05
Mike comes across a 150-year-old Martin acoustic guitar which just might be the big ticket item he has been searching for. A rifle-toting homeowner's property is off limits until the guys do some fast talking. Danielle gets a vintage Indian motorcycle motor appraised and keeps her fingers crossed for a major profit.
79	6	"Sturgis or Bust"	November 5, 2012	7.06
Danielle gets in way over her head when she splurges on the skeletal remains of a rare 1935 Indian Chief motorcycle. Facing a huge loss on the bike, the guys dedicate $30,000 to its restoration with the plan being to sell it at the Sturgis Motorcycle Rally.
80	7	"Picking Superheroes"	November 12, 2012	7.07
The guys pick a Pennsylvania warehouse and find a rare comic book that gets Mike's "spidey" senses twitching. Frank tries to negotiate the purchase of a vintage cigarette machine with a lifetime collector who is also a reluctant seller. A ramshackle old house in South Carolina looks promising, but it is also said to be haunted by a ghost named Pearl.
81	8	"Duke of Oil"	November 19, 2012	7.08
While visiting the "Godfather of Petroliana", Mike is mesmerized by a one-of-a-kind vintage motorcycle sign but must resist the urge to overpay for it. In Virginia, the guys meet a Southern gentleman named Ned who keeps his treasures in a creepy cabin in the woods. Back in Iowa, Danielle's unique company car drives her crazy.
82	9	"Substitute Picker"	November 26, 2012	7.09
With Frank too sick to go picking, Mike's brother Robbie scrambles to fill in at the last minute for the trip that Danielle's been planning for two months. In Idaho, the guys find a barn-sized man cave filled with an awesome collection of Western Americana including antique spurs that could be worth huge money. In Oregon, with a serious wager on the line, Robbie feels the pressure to outpick Mike and scours for a big-ticket item.
83	10	"Full Steam Ahead"	December 3, 2012	7.10
After taking a joyride on a rare 100-year-old monster tractor, Mike and his brother Robbie take to a property packed with amazing steam engines and rusty relics. In the state of Washington, Robbie's bid on some heavy machinery leads to a high-stakes lumberjack competition. Later, the guys head to Whidbey Island in Puget Sound and find a graveyard of car grilles and a 1947 Chevy pickup.
84	11	"Dial F for Fritz"	December 10, 2012	7.11
Continuing their pick in the northwestern state of Washington, Mike and his brother Robbie stop off for a quick freestyle and come across a 1915 Harley-Davidson motorcycle. Later, the guys pick a collection that is three generations in the making and find an antique bear trap that could be worth up to $6,000. Danielle and Frank team up to pull a long-distance prank on Mike.
85	12	"Woody Wood Picker"	December 17, 2012	7.12
While in Michigan's Upper Peninsula, the guys stumble upon Woody the woodcarver's 80-acre property, which features a Finnish sauna, an art gallery outhouse and a 100-year-old barn that is packed to the rafters. And later, the guys get first dibs on an aviation museum's once-in-a-lifetime sale and their guide turns out to be an American hero with an amazing story.

=== Season 8 (2013) ===
No. overall	No. in season	Title	Original release date	Prod. code
86	1	"The Doctor Is In"	January 14, 2013	8.01
While free-styling in Wisconsin, the guys stumble upon a futuristic 50-foot scrap-metal fortress called the "Forevertron". They meet its designer, Dr Evermor, who tells them it is meant for intergalactic travel. They also discover his collection of spare parts which are out of this world. Later, during a swing through Michigan, the Pickers discover a general store that has been closed for 60 years. Its vintage inventory is completely intact and the new owner Charlie is ready to make a deal.
87	2	"The Million Dollar Mistake"	January 21, 2013	8.02
On an extraordinary property in upstate New York, Frank unearths a vintage Harley Sportster. Later, the guys meet up with Nat and Helen who, after a lifetime of cruising for automotive memorabilia, are revving up to sell. During a backstage delivery in the Big Apple, Frank takes a wrong turn and makes a surprise cameo appearance on Who Wants to Be a Millionaire?.
88	3	"Haunted Honeyhole"	January 28, 2013	8.03
Packed to the gills with unusual mantiques, Dave's two-story farmhouse is rumored to be haunted. In upstate New York, Dennis' vast collection includes rare toys and a pristine set of vintage Beatles bobble-heads. John is desperate to clear out his jam-packed property but his 11-year-old assistant is a tough negotiator.
89	4	"Ladies Know Best"	February 4, 2013	8.04
Frances loves collecting, but hates selling. Her upstate New York barns are packed with amazing stuff and she has not gone inside them for decades. The guys pick a closed-down family resort and after raiding the disco bar, they try making a deal. Technically, everything is for sale. However, owner Marylou will not get out of her car and threatens to take off if she does not like their offer. Charlie's awesome collection spans generations, but the barns and outbuildings that house it are all falling down. The guys dive in to salvage what they can but barely scratch the surface.
90	5	"California Streaming"	February 11, 2013	8.05
With a gleaming airstream trailer in tow and a buyer lined up, Mike and Frank hit the road to California. When the deal falls through, they find themselves in hot water until a rare opportunity leads to an awesome trade. Like a Hollywood back lot, Guy's jaw-dropping collection includes an entire village built from scratch. It is the pick of a lifetime where every building is packed with classic cars and vintage movie memorabilia. Mike and Frank get first crack at a lifetime collection that includes the biggest collection of leather aviator helmets they have ever seen.
91	6	"California Gold Mine"	February 18, 2013	8.06
Freestyling in Los Angeles, Mike and Frank tail a vintage steam car to an auto shop where they uncover an acre of unbelievable junk. Packed with oddball artifacts, the guys stumble upon a salvage yard turned prop shop. Later, the guys meet Cecil, a man who has built himself a rustic little Western town and filled it with amazing stuff.
92	7	"California Kustom"	February 25, 2013	8.07
Mike and Frank pay a visit to Grizzly Adams actor Dan Haggerty's treasure-filled California home. Mike and Frank get behind the wheel of the original Batmobile and drive off with a rare piece of television history. Later, the guys uncover a rare camel ride but owner Sean's prices are through the roof.
93	8	"Hometown Pickin'"	March 4, 2013	8.08
In Illinois, the guys follow a trail of junk and find themselves waist deep in Kenny's ragtag collection. He has got two massive hangars full of treasures but does not want to part with any of it. Later, they meet Dale whose stockpile has grown so large he keeps it in an old school. There the guys find a pair of muskets that could be centuries old. Then, in Mike's hometown of Joliet, the guys uncover one of the most eclectic collections they have ever seen.
94	9	"Cheap Pick"	March 11, 2013	8.09
The guys are blown away when legendary Cheap Trick guitarist Rick Nielsen opens the doors to his private rock'n'roll warehouse. Mike and Frank scour a log cabin village museum and go nuts for some cast iron erotica. John's Wisconsin property is packed with great stuff but he is attached to every single thing he has got.

=== Season 9 (2013) ===
No. overall	No. in season	Title	Original release date	Prod. code
95	1	"The Royal Risk"	May 27, 2013	9.01
In South Florida, the guys gain access to Bill's massive stockpile. Then Mike falls for a century-old Royal Pioneer motorbike but balks at the mammoth price tag. Later, the guys assemble a custom Chopper in five minutes flat. But Mike's love affair with the Pioneer bike throws off his game until he prepares to blow the biggest wad of cash he has ever spent!
96	2	"Step Right Up"	June 3, 2013	9.02
In Florida, Mike and Frank get VIP access to an authentic retro sideshow where they meet the Wolf Boy and a world champion sword swallower. Later, the guys get junk drunk at a former pawnshop owner's jam-packed property. And, at a Tampa museum, the guys get some great news about a carnie artifact.
97	3	"Deuce Digging"	June 10, 2013	9.03
The guys hit the alleys of small town Illinois where Mike bids on the rusty frame of the most famous hotrod of all time. The guys get unprecedented access to a family's dusty collection. Mike and Frank agree to invest some serious coin in a legendary restoration project.
98	4	"Pinch Picker"	June 17, 2013	9.04
With slim pickings in southern Florida, Mike and Frank finally stumble on a hurricane-ravaged barn. The guys scour a millionaire's awesome collection where they spring for a mysterious car part that may be worth a fortune. When Mike throws out his back, Danielle fills in and hits the road with Frank.
99	5	"Cowboys and Cobwebs"	June 24, 2013	9.05
In Arkansas, Frank and Danielle pick a former trading post that is packed with awesome Americana. Later, Dr. Smith's family hospital has been shuttered for decades and it is filled with vintage medical curios. And finally, Cotton's roadside home looks like a rad junk shop but he is determined to hold on to every single piece.
100	6	"White Knuckles"	July 8, 2013	9.06
In Arkansas Mike tries to keep a poker face while bidding on a 1944 Knucklehead Harley. Later, a random freestyle stop leads to a mega pick honey hole. Back in Iowa, Danielle gets fired up over a gun appraisal.
101	7	"Bad Mother Shucker"	July 15, 2013	9.07
In an awesome Arkansas auction hall, Mike does business with a fast-talking taxidermy deer. In a ghost town full of empty storefronts, the guys pick an old-school general store that is packed with merchandise. And later, while combing through a massive toy collection, Mike spies a retro billboard that could be worth a bundle.
102	8	"Traders of the Lost Parts"	July 22, 2013	9.08
With Civil War relics and bargain basement prices, the guys scour an extraordinary New Jersey collection. After years of searching, Mike finally zeroes in on a rare 1911 Harley motor he needs to complete a rustoration project, but there's a catch. Later, housed in a small-town church, Dave's heavenly stockpile features retro relics and unbeatable prices.
103	9	"Reverse the Curse"	July 29, 2013	9.09
Freestyling near Atlantic City, Frank confronts his bad car karma and takes a gamble on a set of vintage wheels. At Harry's sprawling New Jersey junkyard, the guys uncover a flying saucer and a larger-than-life Popeye. Back in Iowa, the team awaits the appraiser's verdict on Frank's road-worthy 1963 Cadillac.
104	10	"Going Hollywood"	August 5, 2013	9.10
Jackie "Hollywood" unveils his incredible Staten Island body shop art gallery. A Pennsylvania couple has filled two sprawling warehouses with their mammoth collection. Back in Iowa, Danielle hauls a rare scooter to the garage for a pricey rebuild.
105	11	"Louisiana Purchase"	August 12, 2013	9.11
The guys are freestyling in Louisiana when Frank spots an alien spaceship emerging from an Airstream trailer. Later, Mike's honest approach wins over a tough-as-nails negotiator. A local historian owns an abandoned cotton town and all the treasures in it. Meanwhile, back in Iowa, Danielle prepares to unveil her secret renovation project.
106	12	"Grin and Bear It"	August 19, 2013	9.12
The guys are winging it in Texas when the automotive gods come through with two once-in-a-lifetime picking opportunities. Later, Mike and Frank uncover a mega stash that includes a meteorite and a room full of branding irons. Down the road, the guys go hog wild for Bear's sprawling junkyard, but the tough Texan is reluctant to sell anything to a pair of Yankees.

=== Season 10 (2013) ===
No. overall	No. in season	Title	Original release date	Prod. code
107	1	"The Italian Job: Part 1"	October 9, 2013	10.01
A rare race car is sought in Italy.
108	2	"The Italian Job: Part 2"	October 9, 2013	10.02
A skeletal Fiat 500 is found in Rome.
109	3	"Sicilian Standoff"	October 16, 2013	10.03
The guys look for rare scooters in Sicily.
110	4	"London Calling"	October 23, 2013	10.04
A red phone booth is found in England.
111	5	"Pick or Treat"	October 30, 2013	10.05
An abandoned amusement park in Oklahoma is explored.
112	6	"Dani Smells a Rat Rod"	November 6, 2013	10.06
Mike and Frank meet an octogenarian artist with a collection that includes shrines to the women in his life. They also visit a junkyard featuring rusty gold; and Danielle uncovers a secret.
113	7	"Tough Texas"	November 13, 2013	10.07
The guys visit Texas and Illinois.
114	8	"Picking It Forward"	November 20, 2013	10.08
The guys help organize a charity auction.
115	9	"Cammy Camaro"	November 27, 2013	10.09
The guys visit Kansas and Iowa.
116	10	"Lead of a Lifetime"	December 4, 2013	10.10
A fabled motorcycle is sought in Oklahoma.
117	11	"Bonnie, Clyde and the King"	December 8, 2013	10.11
The Bonnie & Clyde Ambush Museum in Louisiana is visited.
118	12	"Pam's Labyrinth"	December 18, 2013	10.12
This episode is dedicated to the titular Pam Davis (1946–2013) who died between the filming of the episode in her former drug store artists workshop and the airing of the episode. The former Auburn Cord Duesenberg factory in Oklahoma is visited.
119	13	"American Pickers: Off the Road"	December 24, 2013	10.13
Mike and Frank get off the road for a behind-the-scenes look back at their most memorable moments together. Along with Danielle, they have put together a retrospective of their dustiest adventures, most amazing discoveries, favorite characters along with some early, never before seen footage of Mike and Frank picking.

=== Season 11 (2014) ===
No. overall	No. in season	Title	Original release date	Prod. code
120	1	"The Einstein Gamble"	January 8, 2014	11.01
A collection of oddities and memorabilia is found in Upstate New York.
121	2	"KISS and Sell"	January 15, 2014	11.02
The guys visit a costume shop in Upstate New York. Also: art-deco cigarette machines.
122	3	"The King's Ransom"	January 22, 2014	11.03
A life-size sculpture of Elvis is uncovered in rural Vermont; rare military memorabilia is found in New York.
123	4	"For a Few Dollars More"	January 29, 2014	11.04
Glow-in-the-dark sculptures are found in Colorado.
124	5	"Mountain Mayhem"	February 5, 2014	11.05
A 135-year-old opera house in Colorado is explored.
125	6	"The Mega-Pick"	April 2, 2014	11.06
The guys explore a massive car collection in Massachusetts.
126	7	"Franks Holy Grail"	April 9, 2014	11.07
A series of rare gems are discovered in Rhode Island.
127	8	"Backroad Barnstorming"	April 16, 2014	11.08
A dairy farm in Connecticut is explored.
128	9	"Legend Of The Lost Indian"	April 23, 2014	11.09
A stash of Indian motorcycles is explored in Massachusetts.
129	10	"Enter The Negotiator"	April 30, 2014	11.10
An ultra rare cycle car is discovered in Florida.
130	11	"Mad As A Picker"	May 7, 2014	11.11
The guys land a custom pick for the theme park Dollywood.
131	12	"Captain Quirk"	May 14, 2014	11.12
Frank and Dave's road trip through Florida gets stranger at every turn, from a creepy collection of kitsch to a tugboat that is home to a Captain and his unusual pet. And back in Iowa, Mike readies the new shop for its Grand Opening.
132	13	"Sweet Homes Alabama"	May 21, 2014	11.13
Picking the South pays off when Alabama turns up a jackpot of unusual items, including a pricey relic from a legendary plantation home. A small-town Chevy dealership is a time capsule of classic car nostalgia. And the guys get some Southern hospitality at a freestyle stop that turns into a mega-pick complete with its own general store.
133	14	"The Need for Speed"	June 4, 2014	11.14
The guys hit pay dirt in Alabama while freestyling at a retro automotive warehouse owned by a true blue racing family. They hit a dead end negotiating against the county's former police chief. And Mike hatches a strategy to walk away with a must-have Lambretta scooter.
134	15	"Shock Value"	June 11, 2014	11.15
A collector with an unusual taste for high voltage oddities reveals his shocking stash, and Mike and Frank's luck runs cold when they are stonewalled by the Willett brothers.

=== Season 12 (2014) ===
No. overall	No. in season	Title	Original release date	Prod. code
135	1	"Alien vs. Picker"	July 30, 2014	12.01
Eccentric Prince Mongo answers to an other-worldly power and commands Mike and Frank to buy, but refuses to quote them any prices; a man cave full of rare cars, and a freestyle stop in Kentucky reveals two surprise finds.
136	2	"Raze the Roof"	August 6, 2014	12.02
With the roof caving in on his massive family stockpile, a Kentucky collector is motivated to sell whatever he can before it is too late. And that is great news for Mike and Frank because the mega-pick features a mind-boggling array of awesome stuff. Down the road in West Virginia, lifelong packrat Tim has decided to move some inventory, and after several hours, the guys have not even scratched the surface of his massive collection.
137	3	"Big Boy Toys"	August 13, 2014	12.03
At an awesome California garage, Mike goes nuts for a must-have retro boat and then falls for a BMW micro car that could be worth some serious coin. Down the road, the guys pay a return visit to a totally rad radiator shop where they comb through the late owner's huge stockpile.
138	4	"Plymouth Rocks"	August 20, 2014	12.04
In car country, Mike falls hard for a 100-year-old turbo-charged hotrod; the guys land some sweet deals at a massive man cave, and Frank rescues a vintage muscle car from a rusty demise.
139	5	"Rocket Man"	August 27, 2014	12.05
Mike and Frank make a scene when they hit the streets in a one-of-a-kind rocket car.
140	6	"Virginia is for Pickers"	September 3, 2014	12.06
It is a picking blitz in the state of Virginia, when Mike, Frank, Robbie and Danielle all hit the road to leave no lead unturned.
141	7	"The More You No"	October 29, 2014	12.07
Mike, Frank, Danielle and Robbie continue to double down in Virginia, but hit a roadblock with a seller who will not let go of a one-of-a-kind find.
142	8	"Thunderdome"	November 5, 2014	12.08
It is make or break for the Virginia blitz strategy. Mike and Frank meet a real-deal motorcycle legend ready to clear out some of his high-octane stock, and a VIP pass to a unique mancave turns up a rare item that is old and odd.
143	9	"Auburned Out"	November 12, 2014	12.09
Mike takes a gamble on a 1935 Auburn that is either a diamond in the rough or a total dud. The guys tread dangerous ground while picking an Iowa Harley enthusiast. And Dave unveils a project one year in the making that is also Mike's biggest-ever investment.
144	10	"If You Talk Nice to Me"	November 19, 2014	12.10
Mike is on a mission to buy a rare cycle car he has coveted for more than two years, but they have to make it through a gauntlet of coin tosses and sweet talking to seal the big deals.
145	11	"Let's Be Frank"	November 26, 2014	12.11
When Frank meets Frank, it is a match made in picking heaven; in Illinois, the guys discover a trove of unusual micro-cars.
146	12	"Grudge Match"	December 3, 2014	12.12
It is Frank vs. Mike when the guys take to the track for a grudge match drag race to see who has the fastest ride.
147	13	"Escape to Motor Mountain"	December 10, 2014	12.13
The pickers discover a mountain of motorcycles, but it is protected by booby traps; and one stubborn collector stands in the way of the guys and a mega-warehouse mega-pick.
148	14	"Everything Must Go"	December 17, 2014	12.14
The guys are on the trail of two vintage Harleys in Pennsylvania, but Frank gets more than he bargained for when one bike collector takes a liking to him.

=== Season 13 (2015) ===
No. overall	No. in season	Title	Original release date	Prod. code
149	1	"Museum Man"	January 14, 2015	13.01
In Indiana, the guys discover a collection so big and rare it is enough to start a one-man museum, but how do you put a price on the priceless?
150	2	"Big Moe"	January 21, 2015	13.02
Big Moe's negotiating skills have Mike feeling a bit small; Pastor Bill lives every day like it is Christmas.
151	3	"May the Ford Be With You"	January 28, 2015	13.03
Mike and Frank undertake a major excavation to unearth a rare vintage auto that has not seen daylight in decades, but could be worth a fortune.
152	4	"The Pickin' or the Egg"	February 4, 2015	13.04
A Maine homestead reveals six generations of secrets, and NASCAR legend Ryan Newman proves that when it comes to negotiating, he is just as tough as Danielle.
153	5	"Let It Go"	February 11, 2015	13.05
Mike and Frank stage a picking intervention in Massachusetts and later, help a collector whose massive stockpile is facing eviction.
154	6	"The Maineiacs"	February 18, 2015	13.06
The guys discover a reclusive octogenarian Maine-iac deep in the north woods, and pay a visit to Timtown–a one-man village with 42 jam-packed buildings.
155	7	"From A to T"	February 25, 2015	13.07
Frank makes a shrewd bid that leads to a big discovery; Mike falls hard for two century-old cars.
156	8	"Red Barn, Black Keys"	May 6, 2015	13.08
The Black Keys' frontman Dan Auerbach is set to short circuit Mike's plans to flip a vintage guitar; Sammy has a hard time parting with pieces of his family's history.
157	9	"A Hard Rain's Gonna Fall"	May 13, 2015	13.09
A storm is brewing as Mike and Frank are determined to retrieve an iconic American sports car that is so rare they have never even heard of it.
158	10	"Texas Hold 'Em"	May 20, 2015	13.10
Mike and Frank finally get access to their white whale pick, but not-for-sale Dennis earned his nickname for a reason; in Texas, the guys meet a collector who has filled an entire town with his mammoth stockpile.
159	11	"Great Minds Ink Alike"	May 27, 2015	13.11
In Louisiana, Danielle calls the shots from HQ when the guys find themselves in over their heads; Frank strikes a side deal that leaves a permanent mark.
160	12	"The Big Bet"	June 3, 2015	13.12
It is Frank vs. Mike in their biggest bet ever, and this time the stakes are personal. Will Frank keep his beard, or get himself a close shave?
161	13	"Good & Evel"	June 10, 2015	13.13
An Evel Knievel super-fan reveals some of the legendary daredevil's most personal items.
162	14	"The Numbers Game"	June 17, 2015	13.14
The guys discover a rare 1930s coupe at Buckey's one-man ranch; and the numbers are not in Mike's favor when Frank shows off his beautiful mind.
163	15	"The Georgia Gambler"	June 24, 2015	13.15
Mike and Frank try to beat the house against the Georgia Gambler, who plays for every price; Danielle and Robbie stumble on what could be a million-dollar find.
164	16	"The Empire Picks Back"	July 15, 2015	13.16
Mike and Frank use the force to uncover a secret Star Wars stash in California; the guys try to make a deal on a mint ’56 Chevy Belair.
165	17	"Red, White and Blues"	July 22, 2015	13.17
The guys unearth a music jackpot in an old general store, and a hoarder house holds on to its secrets.
166	18	"The Bundle Brothers"	July 29, 2015	13.18
Two brothers are better than one when it comes to negotiating, which has Mike looking to bundle in order to save his bottom line.
167	19	"Space Oddities"	August 5, 2015	13.19
Picking in New Mexico for the first time ever, the guys head straight to Roswell, but take a detour to a Wild West town with a million-dollar item for sale.
168	20	"Daredevil Duffey"	August 12, 2015	13.20
A daredevil stuntman lives up to his legend in New Mexico and Mike looks for some divine intervention on a must-have pick.
169	21	"Law & Hoarder"	August 19, 2015	13.21
A Texas attorney lays down the law by day and by night is a super picker with a wild warehouse of eclectic stuff.
170	22	"From Coupe to Nuts"	August 26, 2015	13.22
Mike and Frank are unwelcome visitors while freestyling in the Northeast; rehabbing a rare and rusty ’33 Ford Coupe.
171	23	"Coin-Op Kings"	September 2, 2015	13.23
The guys discover the ultimate coin-op man cave hidden on a farm in upstate New York, and Frank hatches a plan to help lonely collectors find love.
172	24	"A Man's Home is His Castle"	September 9, 2015	13.24
Mike and Frank pick a family that spent 40 years building their very own castle by hand, and a circus collector with a wax museum in his living room.

=== Season 14 (2015–16) ===
No. overall	No. in season	Title	Original release date	Prod. code
173	1	"Like Father, Like Daughter"	October 14, 2015	14.01
A retired auctioneer and his daughter have haggling in their blood; Mike has eyes for a long-sought 1930s Cord convertible.
174	2	"Can't Catch a Break"	October 21, 2015	14.02
While Mike makes deal after deal, Frank hits a road block with a straight-talking Wisconsin collector who will not budge on prices.
175	3	"The Superfan"	October 28, 2015	14.03
Mike makes a big league offer on an ultra-rare vintage Edison invention, and a mega stash of beer-related memorabilia stokes Frank's Oktoberfest mojo.
176	4	"Oddities & Commodities"	November 4, 2015	14.04
The guys brave a collection that sends chills up the spine at a former gas station transformed into an eccentric home.
177	5	"Beetle in a Haystack"	November 11, 2015	14.05
A lead on an ultra-rare VW beetle turns out to be a true barn find, but it will take a heavy metal move to bring it home.
178	6	"Biggest Buys"	November 18, 2015	14.06
The top 12 big ticket items that Mike and Frank ever picked.
179	7	"Best of the 60s"	November 25, 2015	14.07
Mike and Frank look back at their best picks from the 1960s, including a meeting with Captain Kirk and a seat in the original Batmobile.
180	8	"Best of the 70s"	December 2, 2015	14.08
The guys take a trip down memory lane in this special episode featuring the grooviest picks from the disco decade.
181	9	"Toughest Digs"	December 9, 2015	14.09
Mike and Frank look back on their trickiest excavations ever, including relics buried underground and awesome finds trapped under mountains of junk.
182	10	"Have Yourself a Merry Pickers Christmas"	December 16, 2015	14.10
Mike tries to get Frank into the Christmas spirit while exploring two super packed picks.
183	11	"Who's the Rarest of Them All?"	January 6, 2016	14.11
The guys find themselves in Studebaker heaven, and visit a designer with the rarest collection in the Midwest.
184	12	"On the Road Again"	January 13, 2016	14.12
Mike takes an epic Route 66 road trip in an antique convertible to bring the car back to the widow of its previous owner. But the 1930s classic may not make it through the 600 mile journey.
185	13	"What's Inside the Vault?"	January 20, 2016	14.13
When the guys visit a woman overwhelmed by an incredible inheritance, she opens the doors to a secret vault. And they meet their match in an 80-year-old rebel who speeds a mini bike around his massive property.
186	14	"This One Stings"	January 27, 2016	14.14
Mike makes a mistake in Indiana, and while the guys get a warm reception from a carnie collector in Ohio, the pick brings an unexpected sting.
187	15	"Full Speedo Ahead"	February 3, 2016	14.15
The guys visit a man with a puzzling nickname who has not thrown away anything since the 1950s, and is not willing to start now. And he is not shy about flaunting his favorite underwear, which comes as a shock to Mike and Frank.
188	16	"Jersey's Jackpot"	February 10, 2016	14.16
When the guys do a favor for a friend, what seems like a raw deal becomes a surprising win-win situation. Plus, they get behind a locked door that has not been opened in decades.
189	17	"A Few Good Junk Men"	February 17, 2016	14.17
The guys stumble on the mother lode of Americana in Maryland. Then, a former garbage man's trash is a real treasure.
190	18	"Frank's Birthday"	February 24, 2016	14.18
Frank celebrates his birthday with a picking bonanza. Plus, the guys make a woman's dream come true by brokering a deal to honor her deceased husband.
191	19	"Signs of a Struggle"	March 2, 2016	14.19
Mike struggles to free a massive vintage sign from a tight corner, then the guys strike an impossible deal with the "Sign Boss." Back in Iowa, Danielle joins Frank for a final joyride in a 1956 Chevy.

=== Season 15 (2016) ===
No. overall	No. in season	Title	Original release date	Prod. code
192	1	"A Colonel of Truth"	May 4, 2016	15.1
The guys pick the collection of a reclusive and mysterious businessman named "the Colonel," who has gone to great lengths to keep his identity a secret.
193	2	"Tick Tock Pick"	May 11, 2016	15.2
The guys go hog wild at a sprawling ranch in Texas, where Mike flips for a VW bus that has been transformed into a hunting lodge on wheels. Plus, Frank finds a storied heirloom that reignites a high school obsession.
194	3	"One Giant Pick for Mankind"	May 18, 2016	15.3
The guys uncover a former firefighter's stockpile which includes an ultra-rare piece of Space Age history. Plus, Frank's plan goes up in smoke.
195	4	"Picked a Peck of Pepper"	May 25, 2016	15.4
The guys go big in Texas with a mega pick at the first Dr. Pepper bottling plant, and tough negotiations in a 50,000-square-foot warehouse.
196	5	"Scrappy Go Lucky"	June 8, 2016	15.5
The guys visit a hardcore collector in California who is under pressure from his County to downsize. Plus, a roadside hunch leads to a bonanza of rare vintage cars.
197	6	"No Stoner Left Unturned"	June 15, 2016	15.6
The guys meet a man who had pieces on display in the Smithsonian, but find that what he has held on to is even more mind-blowing. And a father/daughter power struggle is a roadblock to picking a century farm.
198	7	"Slim Pickings"	June 22, 2016	15.7
The guys visit a jaw-dropping Kentucky property with a racetrack that revives an old Mike & Frank rivalry. Later, a freestyle stop in North Carolina looks like a bust until they unearth a one-of-a-kind TV relic.
199	8	"Planes, Frames and Automobiles"	July 27, 2016	15.8
In an antique shop closed since the 70s, Mike and Frank go toe-to-toe with the sibling owners who negotiate for every last dollar. And, the guys come upon a historic aircraft with an amazing backstory.
200	9	"The Joy of Sax"	July 31, 2016	15.9
A garage door in Indiana leads to a 1950s wagon Mike cannot leave without--if he can sweeten the deal. And on a musical mission from Dani, the guys scour a farm with more than chickens and pigs.
201	10	"Pickers Code"	August 3, 2016	15.10
The guys get a lead from a fellow picker, but is he a friend or competitor? Then, the toughest obstacle is making a deal with "the Godfather of Junk."
202	11	"Another Brick in the Wall"	August 7, 2016	15.11
The guys have an awkward encounter with the "King of the Gypsies," who has an incredible underground stash but insists he cannot be bought.
203	12	"Bucking Bronco"	August 10, 2016	15.12
The guys uncover a once-in-a-lifetime find, and must decide to go big or go home. Mike gets down-and-dirty to rescue an old piece from Mother Nature.

=== Season 16 (2016–17) ===
No. overall	No. in season	Title	Original release date	Prod. code
204	1	"Tough Nut to Crack"	October 3, 2016	16.1
When Frank goes nuts for a century-old snack icon, he must decide if it is worth an unprecedented sum of money to take it home. Then, Mike falls hard for a Roaring Twenties roadster.
205	2	"Sgt. Picker's Lonely Hearts Club"	October 10, 2016	16.2
At an old school drive-in, Mike and Danielle uncover a vintage reel of Beatles' footage that could be the only one of its kind.
206	3	"Bound for Badness"	October 17, 2016	16.3
When a freestyle lands them on the doorstep of a former arms dealer and her Judo champion husband, the guys make a killer back-room deal.
207	4	"Twin at all Costs"	October 24, 2016	16.4
On a family compound near NYC, Mike flips for the coin-op elephant in the room and a staggering collection of A-list mannequins leaves him speechless.
208	5	"Shocked and Loaded"	October 31, 2016	16.5
The guys encounter a mad scientist who creates his own lightning and hypnotizes Frank.
209	6	"High Energy Crisis"	November 7, 2016	16.6
The guys have their hands full with a high-strung super-collector who might bounce off the walls. Plus, Danielle lands in NYC for a high-stakes auction of rock legend memorabilia.
210	7	"Going Down?"	November 14, 2016	16.7
If the guys cannot get a mammoth 1929 Roadster safely down a decaying 100-year-old elevator they will be $20,000 in the hole. Plus, Mike uncovers a surprise when he hears hissing coming from beneath an out-of-control collection.
211	8	"The Greatest Pick on Earth"	November 21, 2016	16.8
After a mammoth pick on a 25-acre homestead, the guys comb through the largest collection of sideshow memorabilia they have ever seen.
212	9	"Hidden in Plane Sight"	November 28, 2016	16.9
The guys explore a stash of ultra-rare motorcycle parts found behind a secret wall, and they find the ultimate aviation collectible -- a propeller linked to Charles Lindbergh.
213	10	"Hydro Homestead"	December 5, 2016	16.10
The guys try to buy from a super-handyman on a unique homestead, but his deal-making could end the pick before it gets going.
214	11	"Time Warp"	December 12, 2016	16.11
The guys are stunned by a house with storefronts frozen in time, containing a bounty of never-sold stock and a secret bootlegging basement.
215	12	"Concrete Jungle"	December 19, 2016	16.12
The guys pick New York City for the first time ever, and go back to the future at a sprawling computer store packed with a mind-blowing stockpile of 20th century technological artifacts.
216	13	"Risks and Rewards"	December 26, 2016	16.13
In Detroit, Frank takes a big risk on one of the greatest pieces he has ever seen. Plus, Mike acquires a Purple Heart along with a very special mission.
217	14	"Rock and a Hard Place"	January 2, 2017	16.14
The guys get the pick of a lifetime behind the scenes at a famous tourist attraction, plus a collector in Cape Cod shuts down deal after deal until his wife steps in.
218	15	"Catch-32"	January 16, 2017	16.15
The guys have their work cut out for them on a huge property with more custom ’32 Fords than they have ever seen in one place, and Danielle attempts an important military mission.
219	16	"Beer Factor"	January 23, 2017	16.16
In the heartland of beer, Frank is surprised to meet an old friend; Plus, the guys secretly prepare a surprise build for Danielle.
220	17	"Divide and Conquer"	January 30, 2017	16.17
The guys double-team a packed property to find what they are looking for before nightfall. Plus, Mike discovers something living in the attic.

=== Season 17 (2017) ===
No. overall	No. in season	Title	Original release date	Prod. code
221	1	"The $90,000 Question"	April 10, 2017	17.01
When they uncover one of the rarest motorcycles in the world, Mike and Frank must muster more cash than ever before to try and seal the ultimate deal.
222	2	"The Great Pumpkin Showdown"	April 17, 2017	17.02
The guys put thousands on the line to strike a deal with a tough negotiator, and they meet Hubba, a rockabilly reverend with many talents.
223	3	"My Sweet Ford"	April 24, 2017	17.03
Mike and Frank find a classic 33 Ford that has been sitting so long that a tree has grown around it. But nothing stops the guys from rescuing this rare ride.
224	4	"Hello Jell-O"	May 8, 2017	17.04
Mike stumbles on a century-old Jell-O ice cream wagon worth thousands, and Robbie makes a huge offer on an iconic Ford.
225	5	"Tunnels and Treasures"	May 15, 2017	17.05
While combing through a mind-blowing collection, Mike stares down the headlights of a rare Ford; and the guys pick a Tennessee home hiding a big secret.
226	6	"Something Weird Here"	May 22, 2017	17.06
The guys are first to pick an incredible North Carolina collection of weird and wonderful circus and sideshow memorabilia.
227	7	"Hot Rod Hero"	June 5, 2017	17.07
Mike and Frank discover an amazing fleet of one-of-a-kind concept cars. Some so unique they do not even know how to price them.
228	8	"Queen of Fortune"	June 12, 2017	17.08
The picking gets red hot and blue in Louisiana warehouse as Mike makes a move on Gypsy Grandma, the queen of arcade games.
229	9	"Woody's Picking Paradise"	July 10, 2017	17.09
It is a picking paradise as Mike and Frank come across a huge 200,000-square-foot factory turned private collection by Woody, its dumpster diving owner.
230	10	"Superhero Heaven"	July 17, 2017	17.10
In a jam-packed home Mike and Frank find Superhero heaven when they come across a rare Superman comic plus the very first Spider-Man comic worth $50,000.
231	11	"American Dream"	July 24, 2017	17.11
Mike and Frank roll up on a coin-op empire ruled by sisters ready to rumble for every penny.

=== Season 18 (2017) ===
No. overall	No. in season	Title	Original release date	Prod. code
232	1	"Mike's Big Buy"	October 16, 2017	18.01
Mike and Frank are picking and dreaming in California. Then dreams become reality when Mike falls for the sweetest classic Ford pick-up he has ever seen.
233	2	"Real Knuckleheads"	October 23, 2017	18.02
Frank falls hard for a rare Harley Davidson Knucklehead at a collectors hidden California compound.
234	3	"40 Acre Pick"	October 30, 2017	18.03
Plowing through a 40-acre salvage yard, Mike and Frank harvest a few lost treasures, including a never-before-seen farmer's mini-bike.
235	4	"Pedal Pushers"	November 6, 2017	18.04
Just outside the nation’s capital Mike and Frank find a stash of untouched inventory from one of the country’s oldest bicycle and sporting goods store.
236	5	"Frank's Big Day"	November 13, 2017	18.05
Frank jumps for joy as he and Mike pick a recently closed toy museum ready to sell their collection of treasures.
237	6	"Hyder's Hideaway"	November 20, 2017	18.06
While freestyling in Virginia’s Appalachian Mountains the guys come across a hidden hideaway filled with history and even some mementos from a bluegrass legend.
238	7	"Rat Rod Rolls"	January 22, 2018	18.07
With a jam-packed farmhouse, killer barn, and rare rat rod Rolls-Royce, a massive Ohio collection has mega-pick potential.
239	8	"The Mother Load"	January 29, 2018	18.08
Mike and Frank accept a special invite from Indiana’s Model-A Ford lady and fall hard for her ultra-rare barn-fresh Model-A tow truck.
240	9	"Double Bubble Trouble"	February 5, 2018	18.09
Mike and Frank visit a hot rod mechanic with a super expensive collection of rare bubbletop cars.
241	10	"The Jersey Jaguar"	February 19, 2018	18.10
Mike and Frank unleash a sleek 67 Jaguar in a New Jersey garage and later pick a general store with a Presidential past.
242	11	"Ripe for the Picking"	February 26, 2018	18.11
Mike and Frank are in Napa Valley but rather than pick grapes they pick one of the largest wine-related collections in the world before the owner shouts “Last Call.”
243	12	"Junkyard Wizard"	March 5, 2018	18.12
A junkyard wizard has an Oktoberfest gem with Frank Fritz’s name written all over it.
244	13	"Slam Dunk Junk"	March 12, 2018	18.13
In Chicago, Mike and Frank find a massive warehouse filled with cast off treasures including some superstar sports memorabilia that are a total slam dunk.

=== Season 19 (2018) ===
No. overall	No. in season	Title	Original release date	Prod. code
245	1	"Adrenaline Junkie"	April 9, 2018	19.1
The guys uncover toy cars worth as much as the real thing, and a stash of custom motorbikes with an incredible backstory.
246	2	"Cowzilla in Colorado"	April 16, 2018	19.2
While Frank is on the mend Mike and his brother Robbie crisscross Colorado and find a giant cow shaped RV.
247	3	"One of Everything"	April 23, 2018	19.3
Mike and Robbie uncover a hidden stash of awesome motorcycle relics at a Colorado property littered with massive man-mobiles.
248	4	"Ready to Roar"	April 30, 2018	19.4
Mike and Frank meet Larry who has the ultimate big boy toys including a rare Porsche and a pair of unusual pick-ups that really get the guys going.
249	5	"Ready to Race"	May 7, 2018	19.5
The guys are stoked to visit a former racer and adrenaline junkie in his vintage Ohio garage.
250	6	"Space Ranger"	May 14, 2018	19.6
The guys head to Minnesota on a rescue mission to help save the remains of a carnival business from Mother Nature.
251	7	"Snow Job"	May 21, 2018	19.7
In the middle of a Minnesota blizzard Mike and Frank face the frost to uncover a rare pair of trucks on farmer Jim’s spread.
252	8	"Frank's Folly"	June 4, 2018	19.8
Mike and Danielle join an architectural salvage crew on a special mission while Robbie and Frank hunt for treasure in an old theater turned prop warehouse.
253	9	"Million-Dollar Cars"	June 11, 2018	19.9
Mike and Frank find an important part for a million-dollar car.
254	10	"Big Money Racer"	July 9, 2018	19.10
On a 100-acre property in Arkansas, Mike falls hard for a midget race car with a Knucklehead motor and prize-winning pedigree.
255	11	"Texas Treasures"	July 16, 2018	19.11
In the heart of oil country, a family’s vintage service station is just like a petroliana museum where the awesome inventory is all off limits.
256	12	"Texas Pick'em"	July 23, 2018	19.12
Mike and Frank are deep in the heart of Texas where they play a couple of hands of Texas Pick’em with some savvy collectors.
257	13	"Roll Like a Rock Star"	July 30, 2018	19.13
When the guys get a lead on what could be Aerosmith’s original tour van, they head out on a cross-country trek in search of the holy grail of rock’n’roll relics.
258	14	"Big Tennessee Welcome"	August 6, 2018	19.14
In Nashville, Danielle introduces the guys to a former Chevy dealership that could provide an awesome new home base.
259	15	"Bubba Gump Picks"	August 13, 2018	19.15
Mike and Frank are in Pickin’ heaven when they come across a mammoth collection of militaria that includes Civil War revolvers and even Forrest Gump’s original footlocker.
260	16	"Eyes on the Prize"	August 20, 2018	19.16
Mike and Frank purchase optical items from an optometrist and his wife. While cruising through Florida, the guys go hog wild in a former juke joint-turned-picker’s paradise, built in 1927.
261	17	"The Doctor is Waiting"	August 27, 2018	19.17
Mike and Frank are scolded when they arrive late for an appointment with Dr. Fred. But once they get past his grumpy assistant, they find themselves in a strange world filled with all kinds of weird and wonderful things.
262	18	"Pickin' for the Fences"	October 15, 2018	19.18
In Oklahoma, the guys uncover a baseball signed by one of the greatest players of all time.
263	19	"Mighty Micro-Madness"	October 22, 2018	19.19
Mike has an epiphany in New Hampshire when he finds a mighty collection of microcars including one of the rarest in the world.
264	20	"One Wheel Deal"	October 29, 2018	19.20
In Missouri, the guys visit an historic homestead where they join the search for grandpa’s lost Civil War uniform.
265	21	"High Flying Pick"	November 5, 2018	19.21
Lost for half a century, the guys heroically return a naval artifact to its rightful home in Washington, D.C.
266	22	"Hard Bargain Picks"	November 19, 2018	19.22
While driving Route 66 in Kansas, the guys visit an old hangar packed with jaw-dropping collection of vintage cars.
267	23	"Pickers Like it Hot"	November 26, 2018	19.23
In Massachusetts, the guys try to broker a deal on an original Bowie Knife and discover a Hollywood collection with never seen photos of Marilyn Monroe that Frank goes gaga over.

=== Season 20 (2019) ===
No. overall	No. in season	Title	Original release date	Prod. code
268	1	"Pick Your Battle"	January 21, 2019	20.1
Mike and Danielle pick an over-the-top, tiki-party-meets-rockabilly home while Frank and Robbie set their sights on a vast collection hidden in the fortified bunkers of an old army base.
269	2	"The Great Pick Off"	January 28, 2019	20.2
The great pick-off continues as Mike and Danielle continue their team effort to take on Frank and Robbie for ultimate picking bragging rights.
270	3	"Picker's Dozen"	February 4, 2019	20.3
A century-old Italian grocery store turned time capsule features an early 20th century delivery truck and a secret crypt that is calling Mike’s name.
271	4	"Presidential Picks"	February 11, 2019	20.4
The Pickers are on a Presidential Trail as Mike and Danielle head for Pennsylvania while Frank and Robbie are on a whistle stop tour of North Dakota.
272	5	"Pick Like a Honey Badger"	February 25, 2019	20.5
Mike and Frank are itching to see what is inside a barn that has been off limits for a quarter of a century. And while Mike makes like a honey badger, bundle master Frank strikes again.
273	6	"Raiders of the Lost Pick"	March 4, 2019	20.6
Mike and Danielle crawl into a Pittsburgh time capsule while Frank and Robbie plow through six generations of stuff on one of Michigan’s oldest farms.
274	7	"Rock'n'Roll Heaven"	March 11, 2019	20.7
It is all Rock and Roll as the guys tackle the painstaking preservation of Aerosmith’s original tour van while a star-struck Frank picks one of his teen idols.
275	8	"Pick This Way"	March 18, 2019	20.8
Aerosmith’s legendary tour van gets an overhaul just in time for a visit from Rock'n'Roll royalty.
276	9	"The Michigan Madman"	May 20, 2019	20.9
The guys stumble upon two of the fastest motorcycles ever built and they are determined to save them from oblivion.
277	10	"The Mysterious Madame X"	May 27, 2019	20.10
Mike and Mefford, the mechanic, are on the hunt for Madame X.
278	11	"Space Invaders Smackdown"	June 3, 2019	20.11
The guys are ready to light up the sky when they pick a Detroit warehouse packed with vintage searchlights.
279	12	"Frank Meet Brank"	June 10, 2019	20.12
The guys have high hopes when they uncover a sexy 1935 Auburn roadster on an Indiana farm, but end up with just a kiddie ride instead.
280	13	"Van-Tastic"	June 17, 2019	20.13
The boys uncover a treasure trove of VW buses in Arkansas, and with the collection under threat from vandals, Mike is determined to rescue as many as possible.
281	14	"Corvette King"	June 24, 2019	20.14
The guys visit a gas pump graveyard in Louisiana while Danielle finds a home for a pair of historic drag bikes.
282	15	"Alabama Rolls"	July 1, 2019	20.15
An Alabama couple has one of the biggest collections the guys have ever come across, including a number of high-octane cars saved from the scrap heap.
283	16	"Aerosmith Van"	July 8, 2019	20.16
After picking an awesome surf museum in California, Mike and Frank catch up with the Aerosmith van in Vegas. Later, they drive the iconic van down the strip to meet their rock 'n' roll idols for the big reveal.
284	17	"Georgia On My Mind"	July 15, 2019	20.17
Mike and Frank hightail it to Georgia hoping to snap up a super rare roadster and get it back on the highway.
285	18	"Double DeLorean Delight"	July 22, 2019	20.18
On a ramshackle New Jersey estate, Mike and Danielle go on a Back-to-the-Future joyride in a DeLorean.
286	19	"Freaky Florida"	July 29, 2019	20.19
In a freaky Florida town steeped with Carnival history, Mike gambles big on the mother lode of must-have circus banners.
287	20	"California Picking"	August 5, 2019	20.20
In the mountains of Southern California, the guys start their pick in an old train caboose and make off with a bulging bounty of cool old signs.
288	21	"Say Sohio"	August 19, 2019	20.21
Frank falls super hard for a 63 Corvette Stingray and he keeps raising his offer so it makes Robbie wonder if this is really Frank. Meanwhile Mike and Mefford kick off an ambitious restoration project.
289	22	"Hollywood Honey Hole"	August 26, 2019	20.22
The guys find a Hollywood honey hole when they meet a stuntman from Hollywood's Golden Age; Al's California garage is overflowing with mind-blowing memorabilia.
290	23	"Knucklehead Frank"	September 2, 2019	20.23
In Southern California, Frank gets a lesson in Knucklehead Zen when the guys visit Andy–a kindred spirit and international man of mystery.
291	24	"Tick Tock Frank"	September 9, 2019	20.24
Frank "tick-tock" Fritz is over the moon when the guys pick a Portland clock shop that is a showcase for vintage mechanical wonders of all kinds.

=== Season 21 (2019–20) ===
No. overall	No. in season	Title	Original release date	Prod. code
292	1	"Picking Through the Ashes"	October 21, 2019	21.1
At an historic Oregon flour mill, the guys tour the site of a massive restoration project and pick some awesome items.
293	2	"Jolene, Jolene"	October 28, 2019	21.2
An old walnut farm in California has barns that have not seen the light of day in years and just might contain the holy grail of vintage work wear.
294	3	"Dani Goes East"	November 4, 2019	21.3
It is tattoo mania in New York as Mike and Danielle pick through an artist’s high-end collection of flash art. Then Mike uncovers a 100-year-old papier mache Uncle Sam. In Ohio, Frank and Robbie bumble through four stories of junk in search of hidden treasures.
295	4	"Double Barn Bonanza"	November 11, 2019	21.4
In rural New York, the guys dive into back-to-back epic picks where the incredible collections tell the story of America.
296	5	"Wolves in Picker’s Clothes"	November 25, 2019	21.5
Mike and Robbie are trying to tackle a trio of vintage fords but their sibling rivalry threatens to blow up the deal.
297	6	"Mr. Whizzer"	December 2, 2019	21.6
Honoring their late father and his massive stockpile of rusty gold, two sisters in Upstate New York invite the guys to pick through Dad’s epic untouched garage.
298	7	"A Bronx Tale"	December 16, 2019	21.7
From a storied boatyard in the Bronx to an untouched 1970s mancave in Oregon, the guys tackle two mind-blowing bicoastal picks.
299	8	"Dani's Picker-versary"	January 20, 2020	21.8
Danielle's 10th anniversary with Antique Archaeology becomes a surprise party for Mike when she turns the milestone into a major league event complete with a Hollywood ending.
300	9	"Midwest Mayhem"	January 27, 2020	21.9
A supersize Chicago machine shop leaves the boys breathless while Danielle and Robbie search for curios at an Odd Fellows Home-turned-winery.
301	10	"Pickin' Safari"	February 3, 2020	21.10
Teeming with taxidermy, Ron’s Illinois home is like Pet Sematary meets the Natural History Museum.
302	11	"Motor Mania"	February 10, 2020	21.11
When the guys are wowed by an epic Iowa collection of classic cars and motorbikes, Danielle and Robbie hail Milwaukee’s king of coin-op.
303	12	"Back Road Buys"	February 24, 2020	21.12
Mike and Frank hit a down and dirty old-school pick in Illinois while Danielle and Robbie enjoy a high-speed joyride in a one-of-a-kind rat rod.
304	13	"Burlesque Queen"	March 2, 2020	21.13
In Illinois, Mike and Frank comb through a mind-blowing historic marina while in Kansas City, Danielle brokers a deal on the mother of all burlesque collections.
305	14	"Cruisin'"	March 9, 2020	21.14
Mike and Dave go hog wild for a former Minnesota car dealership that is now home to scores of dusty projects and a one-of-a-kind miniature cruise ship.
306	15	"Young Grasshopper"	March 16, 2020	21.15
In Minnesota, the founder of Memoryville opens the doors to his vintage wonderland while Mefford-the-mechanic has an update on the legendary Madame X Cadillac.
307	16	"Chopper King"	June 29, 2020	21.16
A jaw-dropping Arizona property features antique motorbikes as far as the eye can see, and in Tennessee, an ultra-rare Zephyr gets a tire-blowing test drive.
308	17	"The Ghost of the West"	July 6, 2020	21.17
In New Mexico, Mike and Danielle make an epic stagecoach stop and visit a frozen-in-time adobe village complete with ghost stories and a Wild West saloon.
309	18	"Moonshine and Motors"	July 13, 2020	21.18
Steeped in moonshine, bluegrass, and drag racing, Bobby's seven-generation Georgia homestead offers Southern picking at its finest.
310	19	"Georgia Wonderland"	July 20, 2020	21.19
While Robbie crosses the Rockies with a legendary car in tow, Mike and Mefford go for a high-speed joyride in a banned badass muscle car without brakes.
311	20	"Zephyrville"	July 27, 2020	21.20
In Florida, Mike meets a gun-slinging cowboy who reels him in with tales from the golden age of Hollywood westerns.
312	21	"Desert Gold Rush"	August 3, 2020	21.21
It is a banner day in Arizona with back-to-back picks featuring a late artist's one-of-a-kind collection and a jaw-dropping stash of vintage hi-fi.

=== Season 22 (2021) ===
No. overall	No. in season	Title	Original release date	Prod. code
313	1	"Pumps, Prints and Picks"	January 25, 2021	22.1
Mike and Jersey Jon dive into a century-old Connecticut print shop while Robbie and Danielle unearth a rare globe at a 1920s truck stop.
314	2	"Hidden Harley"	January 25, 2021	22.2
An historic New Hampshire farm features 300 years of forgotten treasures, and in Pennsylvania, Robbie finds a 1936 Harley hiding in plain sight.
315	3	"Smoking Hot Chevy"	February 1, 2021	22.3
In Florida, Mike and Mefford home in on an immaculate 1964 Chevy pickup and uncover a circus scrapbook with never-before-seen photos of Elvis.
316	4	"Country Queen"	February 8, 2021	22.4
In Tennessee, Mike meets one of the giants of country music history, while Robbie and Danielle uncover a barn-fresh Impala at the perfect Pennsylvania pick.
317	5	"Burgers and Ballrooms"	February 15, 2021	22.5
Mike finds the world's most famous hamburger icon in a Massachusetts chicken coop while Danielle dances through history at a defunct 1940s studio turned time capsule.
318	6	"Bombshells and Silk"	February 15, 2021	22.6
Mike and Jersey John visit a prolific Cape Cod collector while Danielle and Robbie uncover amazing American souvenirs and Queen Victoria's silk stockings in Pennsylvania.
319	7	"Brothers and Burlesque"	February 22, 2021	22.7
Mike and Robbie go wild for a killer main street pick in Tennessee while Danielle visits Cleveland's queen of burlesque to close the deal on a racy piece of history.
320	8	"Hollywood Hot Rods"	March 1, 2021	22.8
Mike and Dave scour a visionary collector's stash of amusement park relics while Danielle and Robbie visit a jaw-dropping line-up of original Hollywood hotrods.
321	9	"A Record Deal"	March 8, 2021	22.9
Mike and Jersey Jon scour a massive family stockpile in Connecticut while Danielle and Robbie uncover an ultra-rare Beatles memento in a jam-packed Pennsylvania home.
322	10	"Rock `n Go"	March 15, 2021	22.10
Mike uncovers a stockpile of vintage relics from a time when toys could kill, and Danielle breaks a sweat over a trunk of ultra-rare concert tees worth their weight in gold.
323	11	"Hollywood in Texas"	June 7, 2021	22.11
In Texas, Retro Rick opens the doors to his stockpile of Hollywood relics. And, Robbie is determined to reunite two halves of an ultra-rare gas globe.
324	12	"Big Tex"	June 7, 2021	22.12
Cruising through the Lone Star State, the Wolfe brothers visit a one-of-a-kind home that was custom-built around a staggering Texas-size collection.
325	13	"Fort Knox of Toys"	June 14, 2021	22.13
When junkyard Ron opens the doors to his mind-blowing Fort Knox of high-end toys, the Wolfe brothers are over the moon.
326	14	"Picking Nirvana"	June 21, 2021	22.14
In Ohio, a late friend's picking nirvana has the Wolfe brothers howling; Brian amassed a mind-boggling collection of rare oversize gems; the brothers drop big money pieces that tell the story of America.
327	15	"Return of the Impala"	June 28, 2021	22.15
Mike and Danielle geek out over a collection of oddball antiques in Ohio while a thrilling joyride in his new vintage Impala leaves Robbie stranded.
328	16	"Racy Relics"	July 5, 2021	22.16
Mike and Jersey John fall hard for a grand South Carolina home while Danielle scores a few racy relics in Mississippi.
329	17	"Fiddles and Picks"	July 19, 2021	22.17
Mike and Jersey Jon home in on some big money picks in North Carolina while Danielle and Robbie meet a legendary bluegrass fiddler with an awesome Nashville collection.
330	18	"Paradise Picking"	July 26, 2021	22.18
Robbie excitedly examines a time-traveling bike in Mississippi; Mike stumbles upon a 1932 pickup truck that has been tucked away for a half-century.
331	19	"Secrets of the Hotel"	August 9, 2021	22.19
For Mike and Jersey Jon, the deals are flying in a North Carolina garage. Meanwhile Danielle and Robbie uncover the celebrated history of a legendary Kentucky hotel.
332	20	"Radioactive Rust"	August 16, 2021	22.20
A retired Air Force general shares his perspective on what the American Dream is; Robbie and Danielle are entranced by a rare assortment of radioactive glass.
333	21	"Homestead Honey Hole"	August 23, 2021	22.21
The Wolfe brothers explore an expansive Homestead in West Virginia; a former drag racer in Texas is ready to sell some of his petrol-related belongings.
334	22	"Coal Gold"	August 30, 2021	22.22
In West Virginia, the Wolfe brothers pick a century-old soda shop that is frozen in time. And a Methodist minister and circus ringleader opens the doors to his eye-popping collection.
335	23	"Joyridin' Pick"	September 6, 2021	22.23
A Maryland car fanatic opens the doors to his late father's massive collection. And, after Robbie takes a joyride back to the 70s, Mike revs up a retro British taxi.

=== Season 23 (2022) ===
No. overall	No. in season	Title	Original release date	Prod. code
336	1	"Skateboards and Gutter Balls"	January 1, 2022	23.1
A California almond farm serves up a hidden stash of retro surf shop relics, and a Prohibition-era bowling alley in L.A. offers a mind-blowing trip back in time.
337	2	"Country Road Gold"	January 8, 2022	23.2
Mike and Robbie visit an old-school general store filled with country road gold. And a serious collector opens the doors to his empire of vintage coin-op scales.
338	3	"Movie Magic Picking"	January 15, 2022	23.3
Mike and Robbie head for the Hollywood Hills to pick a once-in-a-lifetime stockpile of amazing movie memorabilia.
339	4	"The King of Signs"	February 5, 2022	23.4
Robbie unveils his sprawling retro garage, and in Southern California the Wolfe brothers come face-to-face with the King of Signs and uncover the Holy Grail of 3D signs.
340	5	"Cadillac Man"	February 12, 2022	23.5
The Wolfe brothers uncover an overgrown vintage Cadillac graveyard in the woods, and peel back the layers of a gargantuan California stockpile.
341	6	"Picking Frisco"	February 19, 2022	23.6
The Wolfe brothers drop in on an historic San Francisco hotel that is home to an awesome collection of classic cars and uncover a hidden stash of spooky carnival relics.
342	7	"Picture Perfect Pick"	February 26, 2022	23.7
In the California desert, the Wolfe brothers comb through a late photographer's eclectic hide-away and enter a sprawling ranch that is home to a must-have holy neon beacon.
343	8	"High Speed Picking"	March 5, 2022	23.8
Mike visits the Virginia birthplace of a high-speed camera that changed the world. Meanwhile in Nashville, a music guru has some sobering news about Danielle's rock 'n' roll gamble.
344	9	"Pinball Jack"	March 12, 2022	23.9
In the heart of beer country, the Wolfe brothers find the mother lode of breweryana, the granddaddy of all pinball machines, and Elvis inside a Milwaukee collector's suburban home. Down the road, Mike and Robbie make a return pilgrimage to an Illinois honey hole to dig through five generations of history in a century-old mansion full of treasure.
346	10	"Wolves in Wisconsin"	March 19, 2022	23.10
On Uncle Butch's ten-acre homestead in Wisconsin, the Wolfe brothers pay big money for some rare nuggets of petroliana but strike out on a jaw-dropping ride with a Hollywood pedigree. Flying solo in Milwaukee, Mike meets the 97-year-old inventor whose life-like automatons tell the story of America's all-time favorite characters.
346	11	"Searching in Sela"	July 9, 2022	23.11
Mike and Jersey uncover a massive collection of petroliana in Alabama while Dani and Robbie hit an Arizona property with killer steam engines as far as the eye can see.
347	12	"Shelby in the Barn"	July 16, 2022	23.12
In Alabama, Mike goes hog wild for a super-rare, barn-fresh Shelby Mustang while Dani and Robbie visit a New Mexico town that is determined to remain a roadside attraction.
348	13	"Rocket Ray Round-Up"	July 23, 2022	23.13
A Wisconsin collector's oversize storage units feature a bonanza of new old stock, a bale of shredded cash, a gargantuan pistol-and a motivated seller who keeps lowering his prices. Down the road, a former drag racer opens the doors to his museum-quality stockpile of petroliana featuring homemade engine cutaways, a stable full of early Chevrolets, and a barn-fresh must-have pickup.
349	14	"Pool Hall Picking"	July 30, 2022	23.14
In Louisiana, a seasoned collector and his grandson open the doors to a pool hall-turned-catch-all where Mike uncovers an ultra-rare pinball machine; in Mississippi, Robbie and Jersey scour an epic property with tons of outbuildings.
350	15	"Flea Market Junkie"	August 6, 2022	23.15
Mike and Jersey visit a flea market junkie in Louisiana while Robbie and Danielle scour a jam-packed Arizona property where nearly everything is for sale.
351	16	"The Alabama Slamma"	August 13, 2022	23.16
A mind-blowing Alabama collection includes a century of salvage, and in Mississippi, Robbie dives into the huge remains of a family's carnival empire.
352	17	"Knucklehead Blue"	August 20, 2022	23.17
Mike uncovers a mind-blowing collection of vintage baseball cards in Kansas while Robbie and Jersey try to broker a deal in Tommy's "black hole of stuff."
353	18	"Big Bucks Bubbles"	August 27, 2022	23.18
Mike makes a return pilgrimage to Rick's Michigan honey hole. And this time he is determined to seal the deal on a ratty t-shirt and futuristic one-of-a-kind bubble car-no matter how big the price tag. Down the road, Robbie and Jersey comb through a late collector's sprawling workshop where everything is ups for grabs including a bright green dune buggy.
354	19	"The Wizard's Castle"	September 10, 2022	23.19
A Michigan homeowner's historic property includes a private speakeasy. Down the road, Danielle luxuriates in Mae West's former bathtub.
355	20	"Naughty and Nice"	September 17, 2022	23.20
Mike and Danielle scour a mind-blowing Detroit home that features floor-to-ceiling folk art relics and a sensory-overload attic packed with some naughty treasure. Down the road, a random lead at a Michigan road-stop leads to a late collector's mighty stockpile where Jersey and Robbie nerd out on antique tools and one-of-a-kind accessories for a Model T Ford.

=== Season 24 (2023) ===
No. overall	No. in season	Title	Original release date	Prod. code
356	1	"Picking Larry Land"	January 4, 2023	24.1
In Nebraska, the Wolfe brothers comb through Larry Land-an epic 27,000-square-foot hangar full of choice coin-op, carnival relics and more. The good news is that owner Larry is ready to make a deal. Down the road in Kansas, Mike-the-veterinarian has filled the house next door with all kinds of treasures that boggles the mind.
357	2	"Jack is Back"	January 11, 2023	24.2
In Detroit, rock 'n' roll legend Jack White unveils his needle-in-a-haystack quest to track down an historic one-of-a-kind recording trailer that has been AWOL for decades.
358	3	"Small Towns, Big Picking"	January 18, 2023	24.3
A Pennsylvania preservationist opens the doors to his jaw-dropping historic properties. And the Wolfe brothers sift through a rockstar picker's off-limits collection.
359	4	"Wolfes Go West"	January 25, 2023	24.4
In Nebraska, the Wolfe brothers visit a third-generation pioneer village that features a visionary's mighty collection--along with a dozen massive outbuildings that have not been opened since the 50s. Packed with planes, trains, automobiles--and everything in between--as Mike and Robbie go on a wild ride, unearthing dusty museum-quality surplus and long-forgotten pieces of choice Americana.
360	5	"Corvette Me Not"	February 1, 2023	24.5
It is a scavenger hunt for Mike as he excavates a barn-fresh classic Corvette. Meanwhile, Robbie and Jersey sift through 150 years of history on a Michigan family farm.
361	6	"$135,000 Pick"	February 8, 2023	24.6
In Michigan, a late collector's home features a stockpile of awesome wheels. And a wide-eyed Mike comes up with a staggering six-figure offer--the largest in American Pickers history--to take home five ultra-rare motorbikes. Meanwhile, Danielle nails a shot-in-the-dark mission for rock'n'roll legend Jack White and then it is up to Robbie and Dave to transport a legendary recording trailer to its new home in Detroit.
362	7	"Junkyard Jewels"	February 15, 2023	24.7
Robbie and Jersey comb through a homewrecker's massive cache of architectural salvage, and Mike is determined to rescue a trio of dented Porsches.
363	8	"Gladiators of the Track"	February 22, 2023	24.8
In Pittsburgh, a real-life heavy metal hero reveals his mind-boggling stockpile. And in Tennessee, the team revs up for a white-knuckle winner-takes-all go-kart smack-down.
364	9	"It's a Woody"	March 1, 2023	24.9
Robbie is determined to buy the granddaddy of woody trailers, and Mike turns to one of the best mechanics in the country to breathe life into a bundle of ultra-rare Harleys and Indians.
365	10	"Detroit Dreaming"	March 8, 2023	24.10
At Detroit's abandoned Packard plant, Mike gets a tour of an American landmark before it disappears. And in Buffalo, Retro Ron's collection features the Holy Grail of vintage bikes.
366	11	"Little Shop of Wonders"	July 5, 2023	24.11
Mike and Jersey pick a little shop of wonder in the heart of Manhattan. And Robbie chases down the holy grail of brass-era signs.
367	12	"Prince of the Subway"	July 12, 2023	24.12
Mike tries pole dancing when a dumpster-diving artist invites him in. And Robbie and Jersey uncover a bonanza of antique signs from the NYC subway.
368	13	"Baron of the Skies"	July 19, 2023	24.13
The Wolfe brothers seal the deal on a one-of-a-kind bi-plane. And an appraiser has good news-and bad news-about a pricey Wild West impulse purchase.
369	14	"Mega Pick Madness"	July 26, 2023	24.14
Junk drunk on a hotly anticipated return visit to a legendary Florida collector, Mike picks up a mind-blowing piece of Civil Rights history and a to-die-for Schwinn Paramount with an heroic cross-country pedigree. Meanwhile in California, Robbie and Jersey are determined to seal the deal on a folk-art masterpiece of America's most iconic landmark.
370	15	"Kingdom of Lost Junk"	August 2, 2023	24.15
The owner of an automotive boneyard is in the mood to sell. And a California collector's kingdom of junk is home to one of the rarest motorbikes in the world.
371	16	"Beware The Deere"	August 9, 2023	24.16
In Michigan, Danielle falls for a collection of John Deere toys. And in Niagara Falls, three sisters open the doors to their late father's antique time capsule.
372	17	"King of Salvage"	August 16, 2023	24.17
In the Pacific Northwest, the Wolfe Brothers are on the loose and get inside the salvage king's huge 200,000-square-foot fortress-like warehouse filled with all kinds of treasures.
373	18	"Picking The Godfather"	August 23, 2023	24.18
The Pacific Northwest is a picking paradise as Mike crashes into the godfather of Italian scooters while Robbie and Jersey nearly drown in a sea of smalls.

=== Season 25 (2024) ===
No. overall	No. in season	Title	Original release date	Prod. code
374	1	"Classic Car Cemetery"	December 27, 2023	25.1
In South Carolina, the Wolfe brothers pick a main street grocery that is frozen in time, and pay a visit to Sammy's classic car paradise.
375	2	"Hidden Cash Stash"	December 27, 2023	25.2
Mike and Jersey go hog wild over a West Virginia honey hole, and Danielle uncovers a stash of cash in a hidden compartment.
376	3	"Mike and Homer"	January 3, 2024	25.3
While cruising through Southern California on a special mission for Danielle, Mike uncovers a legendary signed guitar along with story boards and scripts from America's favorite cartoon family, The Simpsons. Clear across the country, Robbie and Jersey dive into a massive stockpile of vintage electronics--and honor a late North Carolina collector's legacy in the process.
377	4	"Picking Against Time"	January 10, 2024	25.4
On the hunt for a delectable Porsche, Mike speed-picks in South Carolina while Rob and Jersey visit a motel-size collection of petroliana.
378	5	"kiddie Car Heaven"	January 17, 2024	25.5
Mike stumbles on a once-in-a-lifetime camera collection in upstate New York. And Robbie goes hog wild for a massive stash of junior dream cars.
379	6	"The Five-Generation Pick"	January 24, 2024	25.6
Mike visits a time-capsule drugstore in Indiana, and Robbie and Jersey comb through a five-generation farmstead in West Virginia.
380	7	"The Mile-Long Yard Sale"	January 31, 2024	25.7
Mike and Jersey trip out over an Oddfellow's Lodge in Maryland, and visit one man's combination theme park, art installation and roadside attraction.
381	8	"The Eyes Have It"	February 7, 2024	25.8
In North Carolina, Mike, and Jersey dive into a mad-scientist collection of antique quackery and medical equipment--all curated by Richard, a retired eye surgeon in his 90s. Down the road in California, Larry's barn features a multi-generational stockpile of delicious vintage motorbikes, cars, and leather gear, but the trick is getting him to sell.
382	9	"Roadside Relics"	February 14, 2024	25.9
Mike uncovers a Godzilla-size stockpile of vintage movie posters, and Robbie pays up for a pair of ultra-rare Chevy signs for the shop in Tennessee.
383	10	"Tough as Nails"	February 21, 2024	25.10
Jody's late father left behind a supersized Ohio collection that includes, five hangars, a Ferris wheel, and a steamboat--and after years of careful negotiation, this tough-as-nails negotiator is finally ready to make a deal. Down the road, the Wolfe brothers help rescue a vintage car at a third-generation auto shop in Georgia that has been devastated by back-to-back fires.
384	11	"The Boneyard"	February 28, 2024	25.11
While combing through his buddy’s bad-to-the-bone boneyard in Cleveland, Mike uncovers a massive stash of brass-era bikes–and is determined to buy them all. Meanwhile, during an Illinois heat wave, Robbie and Jersey are the first to wade through a late collector’s stockpile of early tools and the machines that built America.
385	12	"Farm Fresh"	March 6, 2024	25.12
With a fleet of pricey cars and barns exploding with top-notch treasures, Mike and Robbie have high hopes for a sprawling family farm in Ohio. Down the road in West Virginia, the Wolfe brothers pick the scratch-and-dent room of Clifford's automobile museum--a small-town operation with big ambitions.
386	13	"Knockout Salvage"	March 13, 2024	25.13
Flying solo in Wisconsin, Mike gets VIP access to a legendary race car driver’s vast collection of motorbikes and memorabilia and is determined to drive away with one of his prized two-wheelers. Down the road in Minnesota, Robbie and Jersey help an overwhelmed collector thin out his stockpile of knockout signs and architectural salvage.
387	14	"Rinaway Train"	March 20, 2024	25.14
In Illinois, Robbie and Jersey get exclusive access to a former race car driver's stockpile where they uncover rare car parts, pristine toys, and epic stories from the racetrack. Down the road, Mike falls hard for a small-town Wisconsin train museum where he scours the scratch-and-dent department for a good cause.
388	15	"Motorcycle Mancave"	March 27, 2024	25.15
It's a meeting of the minds in Illinois as Mike picks a three-generation family business where the prolific collector's granddaughter knows the backstory of every single item. Down the road--at a motorbike enthusiast's mancave--Robbie pays up for a practice bomb and Jersey steps in to preserve a legendary racer's legacy.

=== Season 26 (2024) ===
No. overall	No. in season	Title	Original release date	Prod. code
389	1	"Evel Empire"	October 9, 2024	26.1
From a Michigan man who was there, Mike learns about Evel Knievel’s rocket-powered Snake Canyon jump–and is determined to buy a one-of-a-kind billboard rescued from the site. In Minnesota, Jersey and Robbie battle the summer heat as they rummage through a late car-lover’s massive stockpile.
390	2	"Wolfemen vs The Automatons"	October 16, 2024	26.2
On a California dream pick, the competitive pinball-wizard Wolfe brothers meet coin-op king Dirk at his giant poultry barn turned private arcade. Mike and Robbie enter a huge hangar full of ultra-rare games and choice carnival relics and find Dirk’s prepared to sell off his massive collection to make way for a new passion–collecting classic roadside attractions.
391	3	"The Great Razooly"	October 23, 2024	26.3
Flying solo, Mike heads to the California castle home of the Great Razooly–a sculptor, entrepreneur, and horror icon whose one-of-a-kind collection includes monsters, gargoyles, and a custom rocket ship on the front lawn. Down the road in backwoods Maine, Robbie and Jersey visit Jack’s garage where the petroliana is hot and the picking is easy.
392	4	"The DIY DeLorean"	October 30, 2024	26.4
Mike meets a kindred spirit at a defunct Wisconsin railroad town and uncovers vintage treasures and new old stock in a jaw-dropping space that’s frozen in time. Meanwhile in Illinois, Robbie becomes obsessed with getting a one-of-a-kind DeLorean knockoff back on the road.
393	5	"Carnival Cash Out"	November 6, 2024	26.5
In Minnesota, Mike and Jersey go hog wild for a four-generation carny collection complete with carousel horses, toy tanks, and bumper cars. Down the road in New Hampshire--on a special mission for Robbie--the guys head to Roger's analog laboratory where the prices are off the charts, but so is Robbie's offer to buy a 20-foot one-of-a-kind swimming lady.
394	6	"Pickin' Wall-to-Wall"	November 13, 2024	26.6
Mike meets a passionate Connecticut picker with major inventory–but getting access to his collection means dismantling a massive, layered wall of stuff. Meanwhile, clear across the country, Robbie and Jersey comb through a California collector’s old-timey General Store, complete with one-of-a-kind displays and just about every vintage item under the sun.
395	7	"Surf, Signs, Salvage"	November 20, 2024	26.7
On the coast of Southern California, Mike is hot for a bonanza of out-of-reach surfboards and rare signs--but he'll have to dismantle the garage to get at them. Down the road in Vermont, Robbie and Jersey visit an historic homestead complete with a killer observatory and rusty classic cars as far as the eye can see.
396	8	"The Toy Godfather"	November 27, 2024	26.8
On Chicago’s North Side, Mike and Jersey get VIP access to a sprawling historic home that features four floors of dazzling high-end antique toys. It’s an eye-popping, once-in-a-lifetime opportunity. And though collector Lou says he’s ready to pare down his stock, striking a deal will take patience, luck, and climbing the stairs.
397	9	"Speedway Thrills"	December 4, 2024	26.9
In Arizona, Mike relives the thrill of speedway history thanks to a motorbike-loving family of adrenaline junkies and their garage full of one-of-a-kind racing mementos. Down the road in Georgia, Robbie and Jersey shake hands with visionary 'body man' Bill and scour a bad-to-the-bone collection that includes a vintage diner, a coin-op Porky ride, and a hand-built wooden Jeep.
398	10	"Wizard of Odds"	December 11, 2024	26.10
While on a doomed special mission for Mike in Florida, Robbie and Jersey pick through a mechanical wizard's jaw-dropping stockpile of petroliana and drag-race memorabilia. Down the road in California, Mike sidles up to a one-of-a-kind family heirloom--a mint-condition Harley three-wheeler whose story is as powerful as the piece itself.
399	11	"Legendary Find"	December 18, 2024	26.11
In the sprawling basement of a legendary classic car showroom in Connecticut, Mike and Jersey pick through a monster lifetime collection. But the thrill of the chase is nothing compared to a joyride in a flame-shooting 1908 Locomobile. Down the road--at a dazzling 1950s gas station in Georgia--Robbie shifts gears when a first-time seller says he's prepared to make a deal.
400	12	"Junkyard Jamboree"	January 1, 2025	26.12
In Alabama, Robbie and Jersey go hog wild for Edd's classic car collection and bad-to-the-bone boneyard--but he's reluctant to let anything go. Mike has a once-in-a-lifetime brush with country music stardom as he combs through the dazzling belongings of the legendary Hank Williams Jr.
401	13	"Gavel to Gravel"	January 8, 2025	26.13
In L.A., Mike and Robbie head back to a fifth-generation demo business and junkyard that's piled so deep that most of its treasures are out of reach. Down the road in Florida, the 'Judge' plays mind games as the Wolfe brothers sift through his monumental collection of petroliana and rusty gold.
402	14	"The Big Mack"	January 15, 2025	26.14
At a four-generation family homestead in Illinois, Mike uncovers the mother lode of saloon relics and gambles big money on an ultra-rare slot machine. Down the road in Vermont, Robbie and Jersey try to broker a deal with a Mack truck fanatic who's keeping a tight grip on his prized possessions.

=== Season 27 (2025) ===
No. overall	No. in season	Title	Original release date	Prod. code
403	1	"Turbo Pick"	July 2, 2025	27.1
Mike and Jersey turbo-pick a mint-condition stockpile in Tennessee and then–in Kentucky–unearth a bonanza of vintage treasures at a 1950s drive-in.
404	2	"Field of Finds"	July 9, 2025	27.2
For the first time ever, Mike puts trusted mechanic Dave in the driver’s seat for a once-in-a-lifetime baseball card pick.
405	3	"The Road to Relics"	July 16, 2025	27.3
Mike and Jersey go wild for an eclectic Kentucky stockpile. And, Mike steps up with a high-flying bid for the Holy Grail of vintage motorbikes.
406	4	"No Instructions Needed"	July 23, 2025	27.4
Mike and Jersey sift through a tidal wave of early technology, and Robbie is determined to rev up a one-of-a-kind car with no owner’s manual.
407	5	"Lieutenants and Legends"	July 30, 2025	27.5
Mike relives the thrill of stuntman Evel Knievel’s legendary career while Robbie and Jersey comb through a stockpile of military relics.
408	6	"Picking Giants"	August 6, 2025	27.6
Jersey chases his steam-powered boyhood dream. And Robbie visits a renowned artist in the kingdom of fiberglass giants.
409	7	"Buying Bonanza"	August 13, 2025	27.7
Mike and Robbie revisit the picking grandpa they never had on his five-acre Kansas empire. And then head to Pennsylvania for a dizzying joyride.
410	8	"Two-Wheeled Treasures"	August 20, 2025	27.8
Mike nails a double deal at an epic Utah motorcycle museum. Robbie and Jersey scour a shuttered family museum that hasn’t been touched in decades.
411	9	"Hangar Hijinks"	November 26, 2025	27.9
An Alabama airplane hangar is packed with medical quackery, and Mike and Jersey go wild for a legendary collection of super-rare motorbikes.
412	10	"Popcorn Pickin’"	December 3, 2025	27.10
A first-time seller opens the doors to his time-capsule general store. Meanwhile, Mike pays a return visit to a Hollywood legend.
413	11	"Rockin' Relics"	December 10, 2025	27.11
Mike visits legendary lead guitarist and collector James Burton at his Shreveport estate, and Robbie and Jersey pick a late letter carrier’s cathedral of junk.
414	12	"Sign of the Times"	December 17, 2025	27.12
A Kentucky roadside attraction is packed with rare signs. In Louisiana, bundle-master Mike helps Robbie seal the deal on a time-capsule truck.
415	13	"Picks and Bones"	February 15, 2026	27.13
The guys pick a Tennessee stockpile that’s been untouched for decades and uncover dinosaur fossils at a Kansas boneyard.
416	14	"Southern Charm"	February 15, 2026	27.14
Mike and Jersey are gaga for a Mississippi historian’s Southern-centric collection. And then uncover a rare jukebox in a sprawling historic home in Missouri.
417	15	"Junk Punks"	February 22, 2026	27.15
Mike and Jersey uncover a Civil War relic that tells the story of America, and uncover the biggest piece of folk art they’ve ever seen.
418	16	"Jewels and Tools"	March 1, 2026	27.16
Mike and Danielle pick a kindred spirit in Texas while Robbie and Jersey hit a mancave honeyhole in Ohio.
419	17	"Museum Mayhem"	March 8, 2026	27.17
Mike and Jersey go gaga for a Texas collection of contraptions and curios while Robbie’s negotiating skills are put to the test.
420	18	"The Iceman Selleth"	March 15, 2026	27.18
Mike and Jersey connect with Joe the Italian ice man in California, and then visit a 90-something master picker in his prime.
421	19	"Marsh Madness"	March 29, 2026	27.19
Mike and Jersey hunt for the remains of a legendary Marsh Metz motorbike in Texas while lone Wolfe Robbie returns to a petroliana honey hole.
422	20	"Rusty and Retro Relics"	April 5, 2026	27.20
Mike brokers an epic trade with California’s custom car king. And Robbie and Jersey tour a 1950s New Jersey appliance showroom that’s frozen in time.
423	21	"Grooves and Gasoline Dreams"	April 12, 2026	27.21
On back-to-back epic picks, the Wolfe brothers unearth a garage full of vinyl and the holy grail of pinball machines.
