= Quadracycle =

Four-wheeled vehicle with pedals

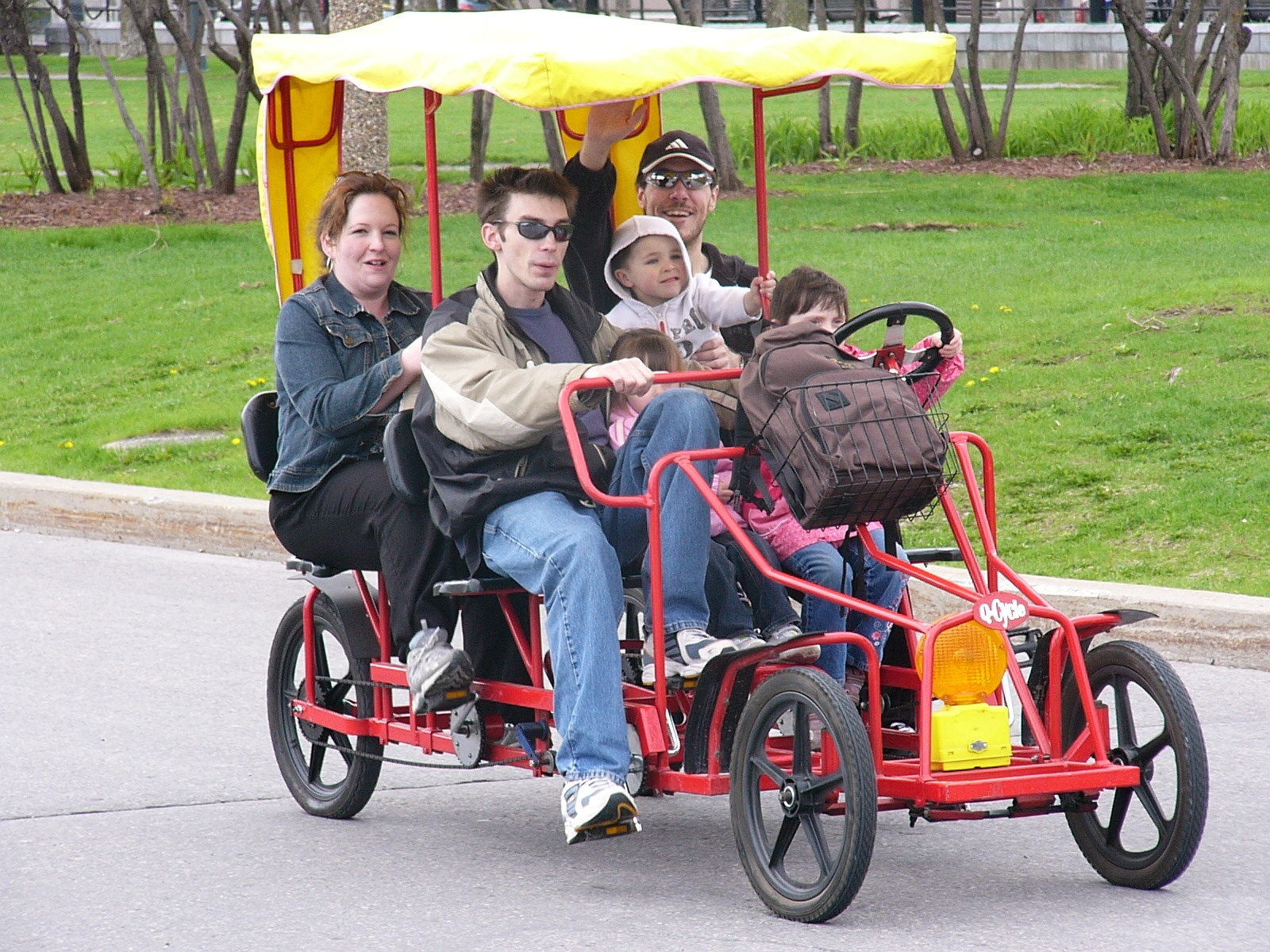
A tourist rental quadricycle: Quadricycle International Q-Cycle-6

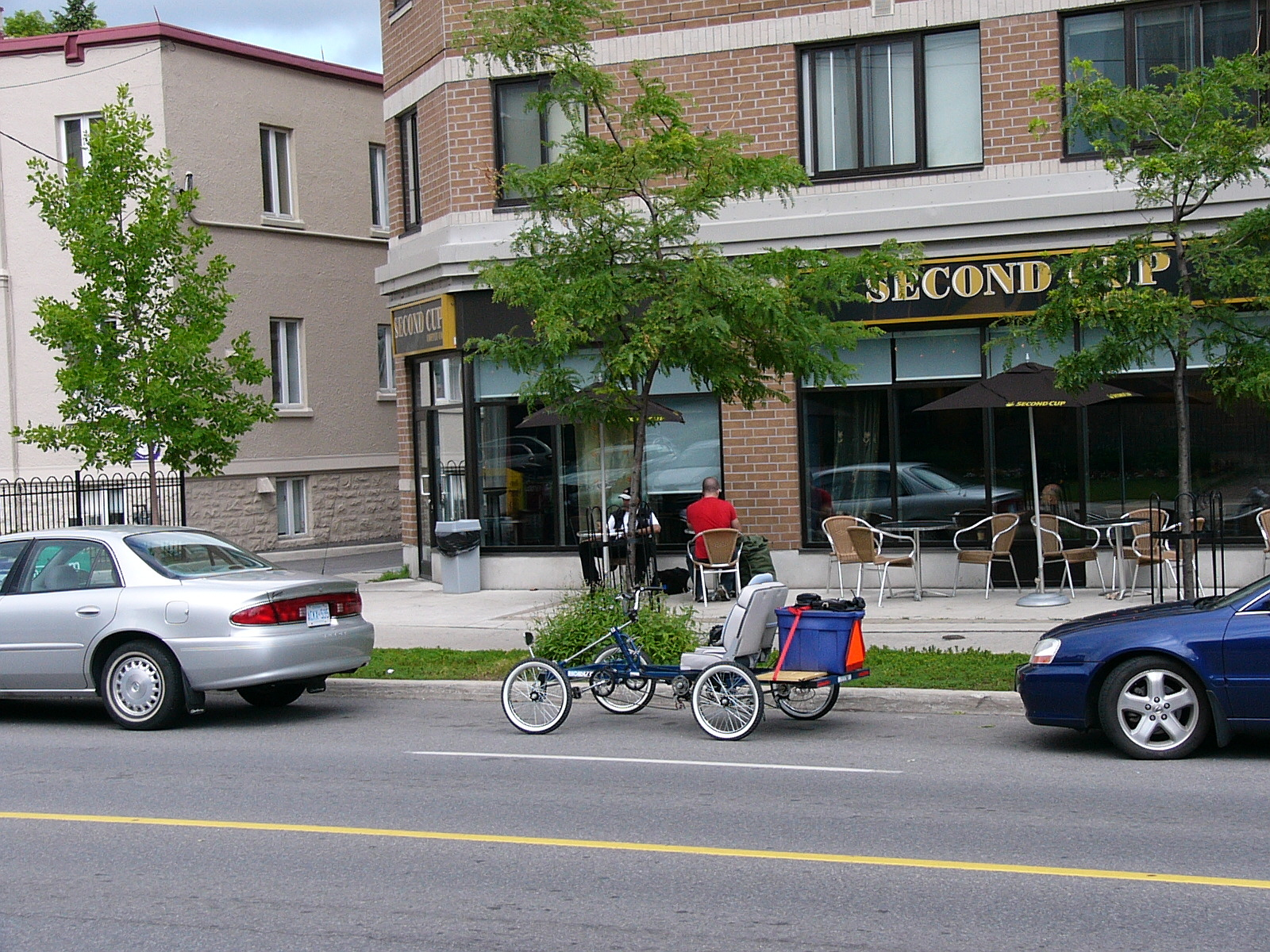
A Rhoades Car 4W2P 4-Wheel Bike parked on a Canadian urban street

A quadracycle (also spelled quadricycle) is a four-wheeled human-powered land vehicle. It is also referred to as a quadcycle, pedal car, or four-wheeled bicycle among other terms.

Quadracycles have been in use since 1853 and have grown into several families of vehicles for a variety of purposes, including tourist rentals, pedal taxis, private touring, mountain and industrial use.

== Nomenclature ==
There is no consensus amongst manufacturers of four-wheeled, human-powered vehicles as to what this class of vehicles should be called, although quadracycle is the most commonly used term. Manufacturers who do refer to their products by class of vehicle call them:

- Quadracycle – 11 manufacturers
- Four-wheel bicycle – 7 manufacturers
- Quadricycle – 5 manufacturers
- Quadcycle – 3 manufacturers
- Pedal car – 2 manufacturers
- Quad – 2 manufacturers

In addition there are single manufacturers who call them Go-kart, Car, Car-Bike, Ecological car, Human Powered Vehicle, Pedal Kart, Quadribent, Quattrocycle, Surrey, and Twin bike.

== Toy versions ==
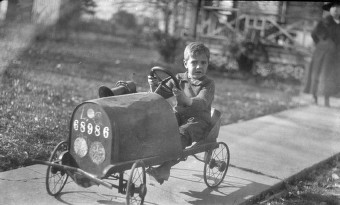
Boy on pedal car

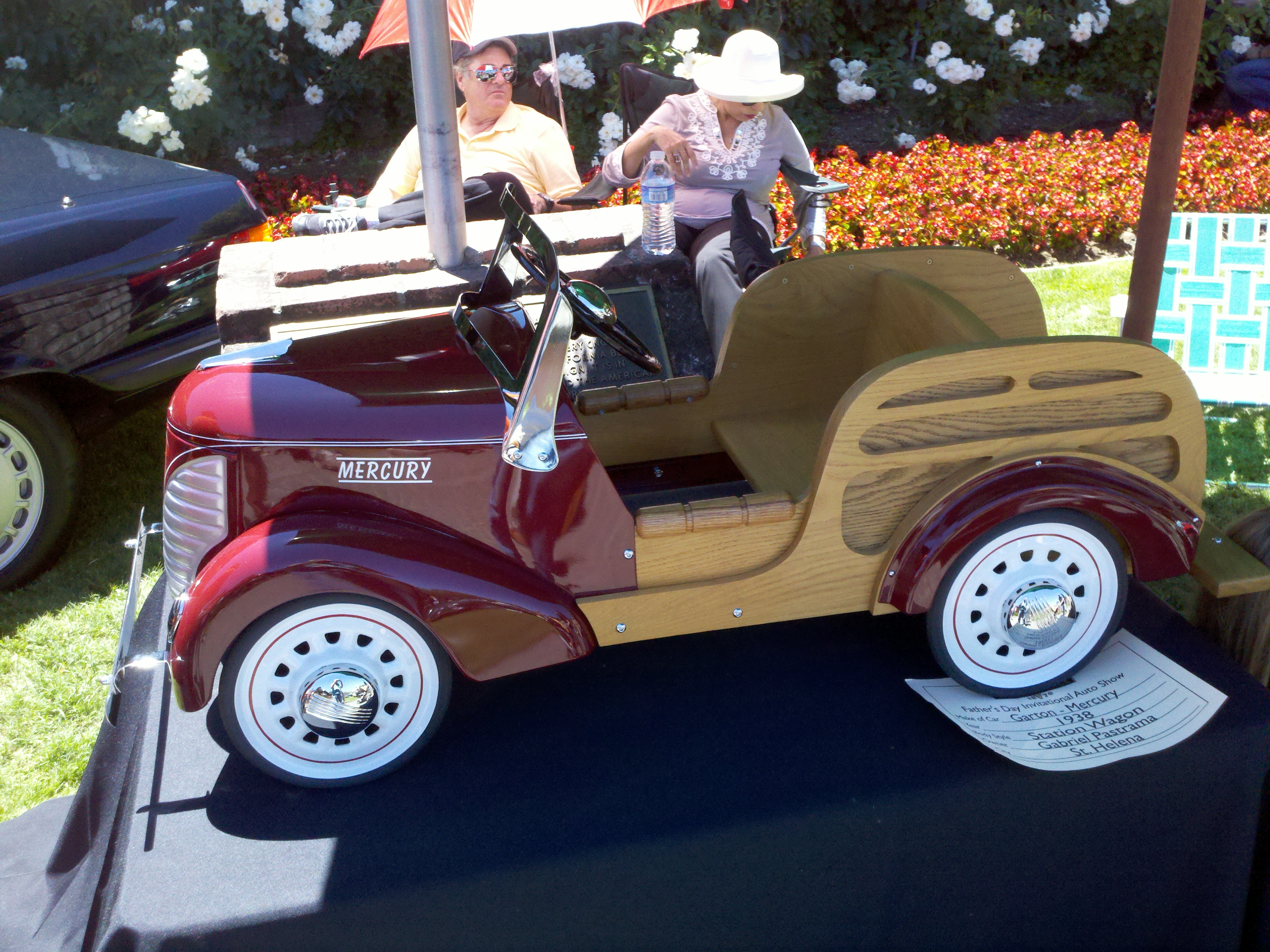
Garton Mercury 1938 pedal car

The most common types of pedal cars are children's toys. These are typically chain driven, but other variants like the pendulum pedals are also common. Tri-Ang began making cars of this design before World War II and had a global presence post-war.

== History ==
The earliest recorded pedal-powered quadracycle was exhibited in 1853 at the Exhibition of the Industry of All Nations world's fair held in New York City. This was about the same time that two-wheeled bicycles started to become popular. Quadracycles were one solution to the problem of low-speed stability in early cycles and were typically multi-seat models. Both tandem (in line) and sociable (side-by-side) seating configurations were used.

One early design that predated 1869 was the Andrews Quadracycle, built by Andrews of Dublin, Ireland. It was made from one inch-square iron and was propelled with foot levers that moved in a long horizontal ellipse. The Sawyer Quadricycle was introduced in 1855 and featured lighter construction, wooden wheels, iron tires and front-wheel steering via a tiller. Like the Andrews Quadracycle it was moved by foot levers driving the rear axle. Starley's Coventry Rotary Quadracycle was introduced in 1885 and used conventional bicycle-style rotary pedals instead of foot levers for drive. It was developed from Starley's Coventry Rotary Tricycle design and featured tandem seating for two. The Rudge Quadracycle of 1888 is described as the first modern practical four-wheeler. It had much lighter construction than earlier models, seated three riders in tandem and was steered by levers from the front seat.

Early in the twentieth century, the Canadian company Massey-Harris developed the Canadian Royal Mail Quadracycle. This was used for mail delivery in Toronto as early as 1901. The Gendron Wheel Company created children's toy replica pedal cars up until World War II.

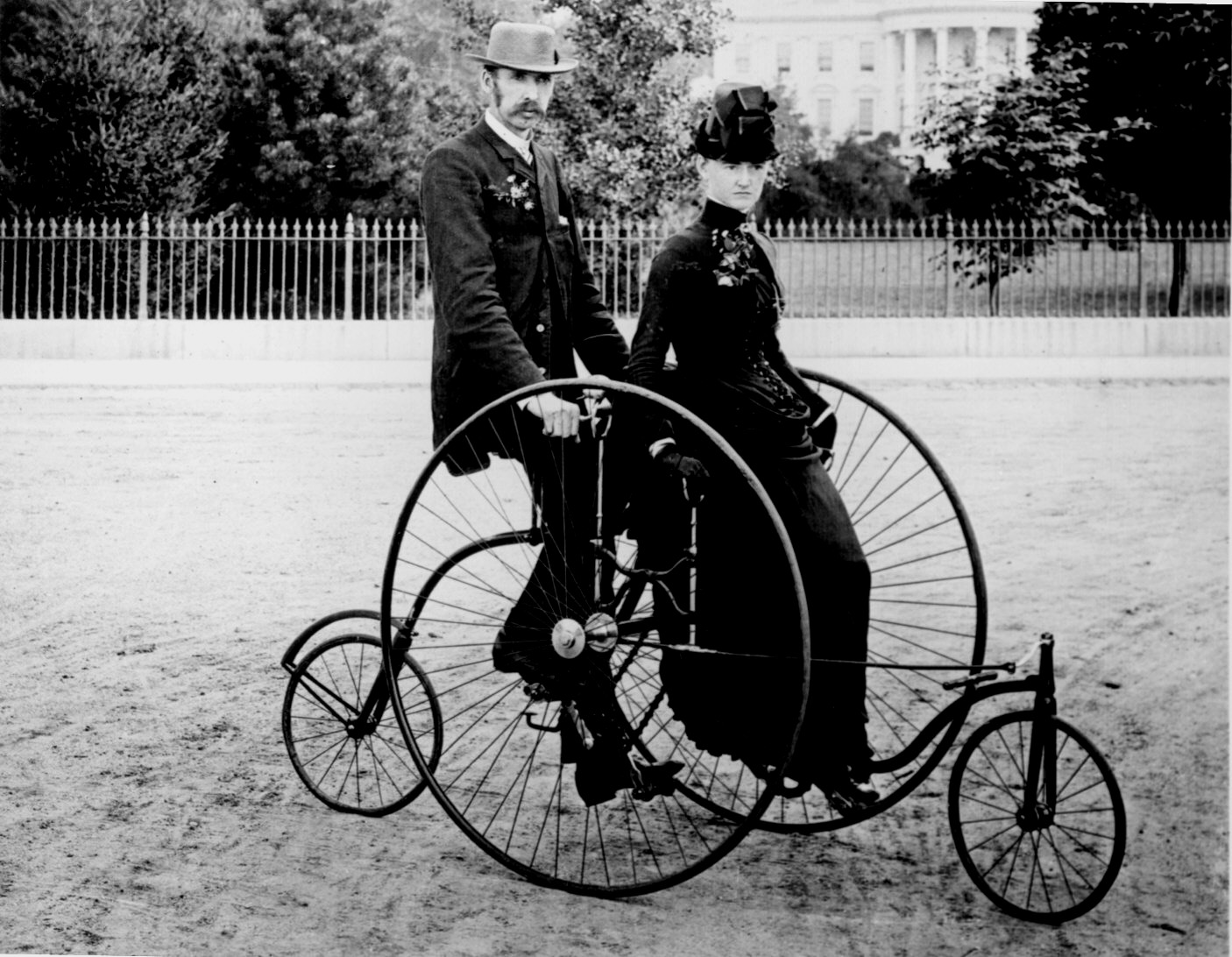
1885 Coventry Rotary Quadracycle in Washington DC

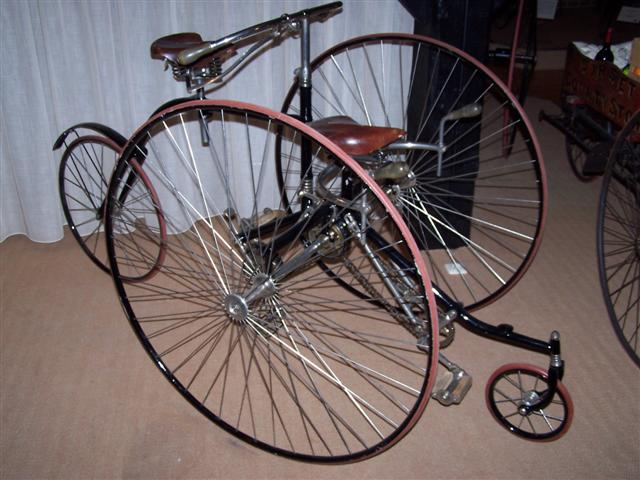
Coventry Rotary Quadracycle (1885) in the Dutch national cycling museum, Velorama, Nijmegen, Netherlands

== Modern quadracycles ==
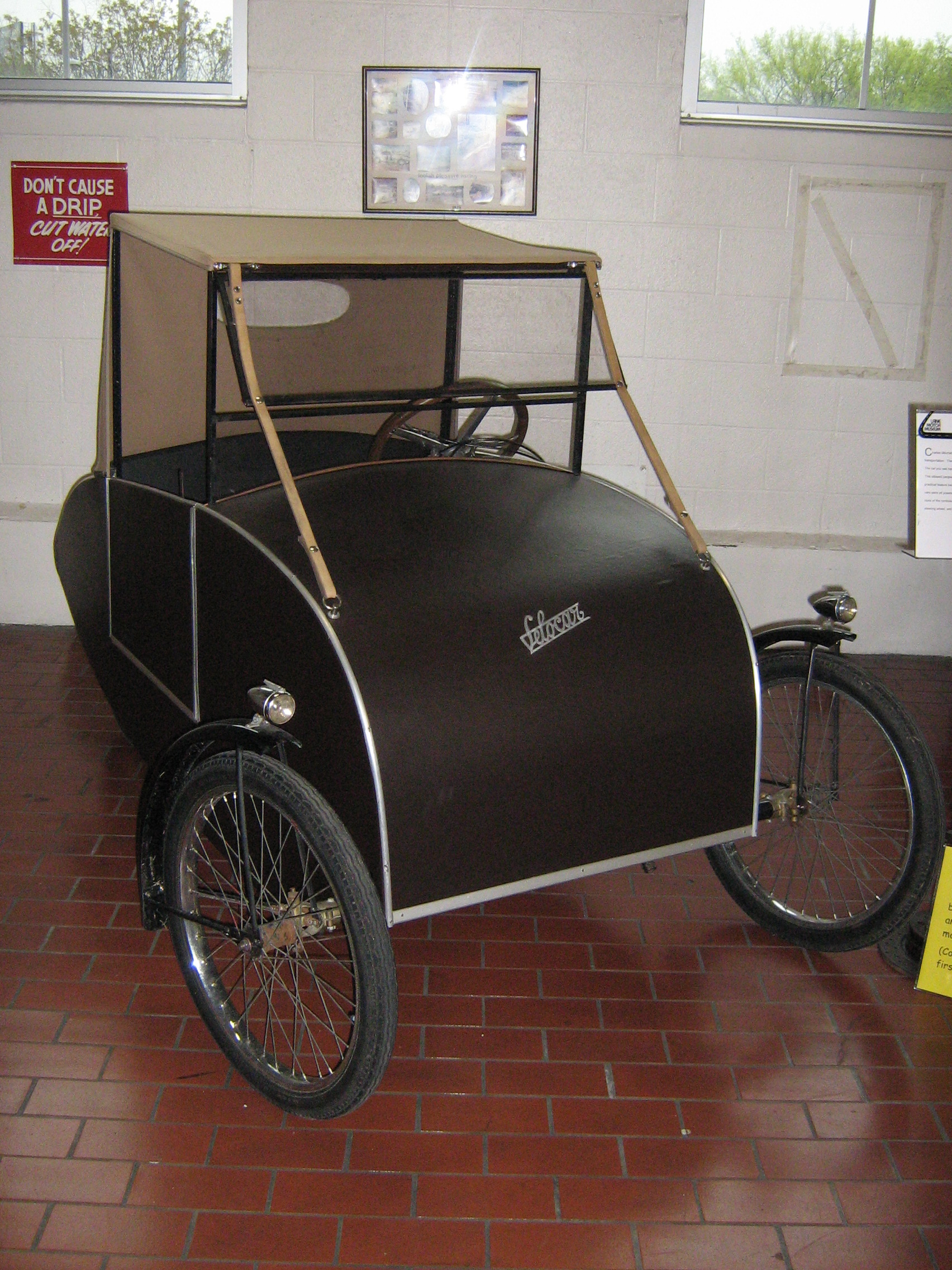
A 1945 model Mochet Velocar

Quadracycle use diminished in the late 19th century as a result of improvements in bicycle technology that made their four-wheel cousins largely obsolete, although small numbers were manufactured through the 1950s for rental use in tourist areas.

A resurgence of 20th century quadracycle use occurred in France where Charles Mochet introduced his Velocar pedal powered two-seat quadracycle in 1924. The various models of the Velocar featured wooden aerodynamic bodies and usually a three speed transmission. Production of final pedal-powered Mochet Velocar Model H ended in 1938, but Mochet went on to become a manufacturer of automobiles. The Velocar proved quite popular, especially during World War II when the French population was under German occupation and gasoline was virtually unavailable for civil use. Restored Mochet Velocars are still found in France.

During the 1970s and 1980s, there was a resurgence of interest in quadracycles as personal transportation, driven by the 1973 oil crisis, environmental concerns about air pollution from automobiles and the search for emission-free alternatives.

=== Tourist destination rental ===
Quadracycles can often be found at tourist attractions where they are available to rent by the hour or day. Modern tourist quadracycles usually feature open seating for two or more riders in a sociable configuration. They are often designed to look like early 20th century automobiles with a bench seat, rack-and-pinion steering, and a canopy top. They are commonly called "surreys", due to their resemblance to horse-drawn wagons of similar appearance and the same name.

Examples of this type include:

- International Surrey Company Surrey
- Quadricycle International Quad-3
- Rhoades Car 4W4P
- Sirenetta
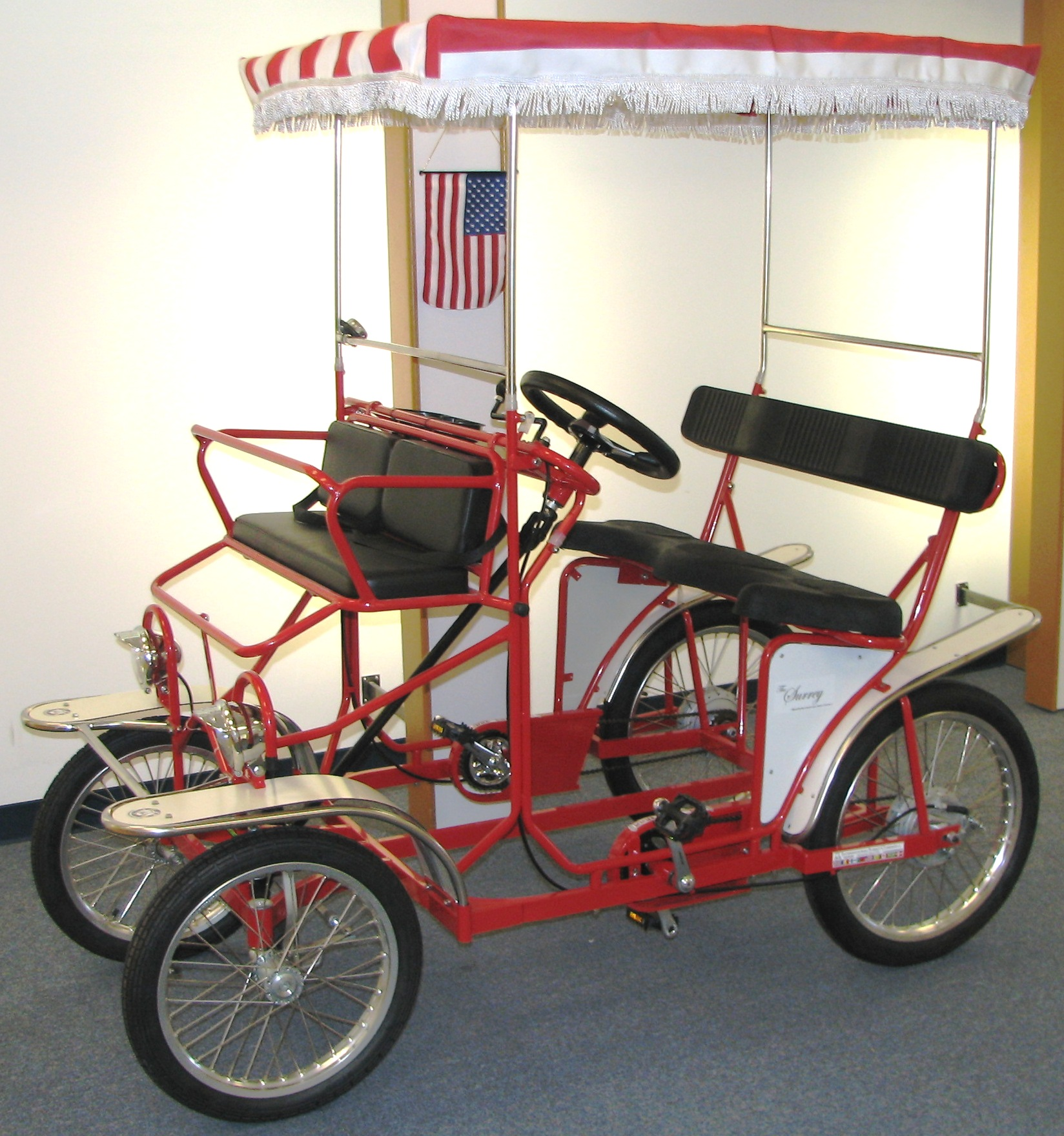
A common rental surrey - a 2008 model International Surrey Company DX Series Surrey designed for 3 adults and 2 small children, equipped with 7 speeds.

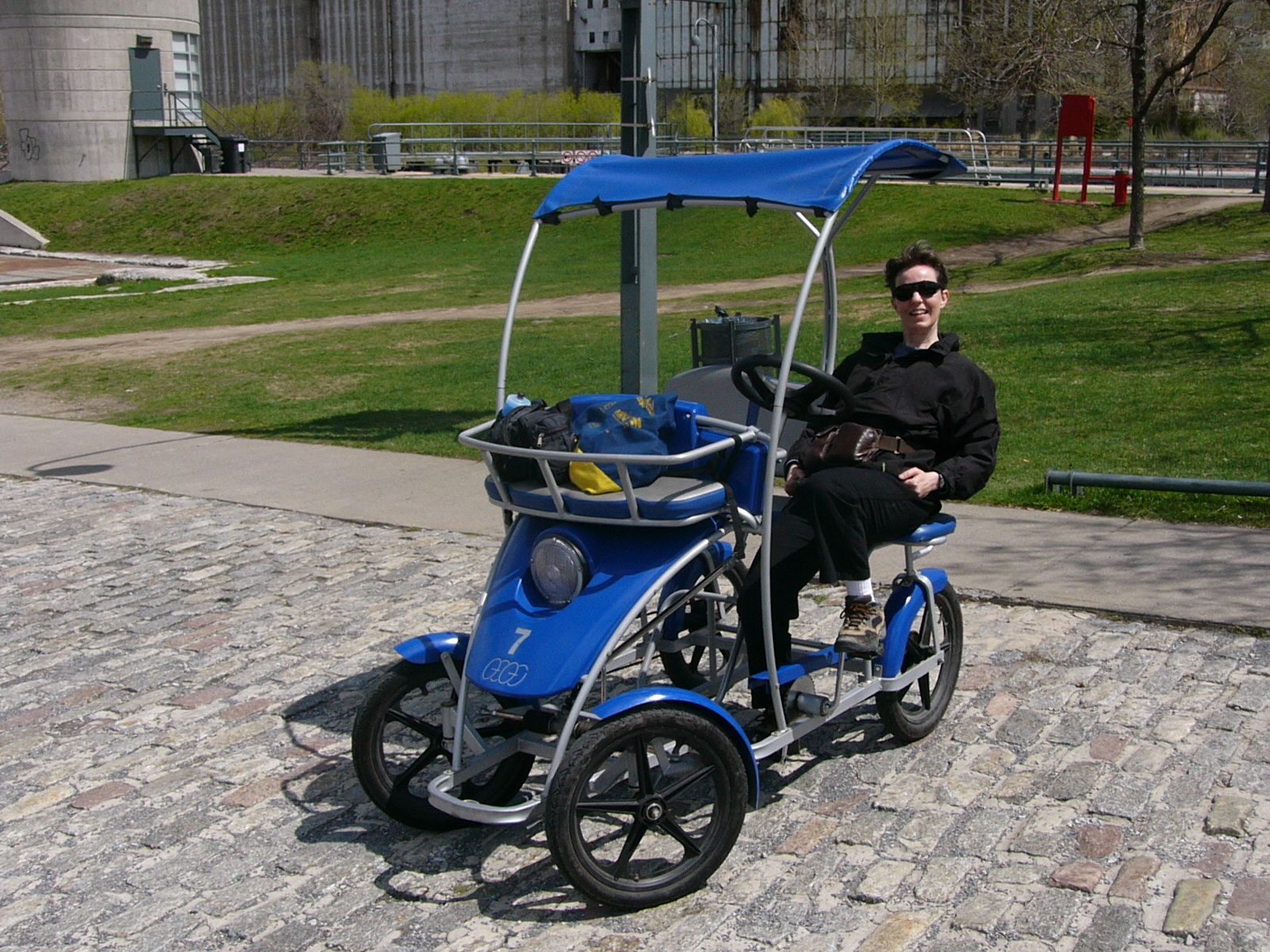
A tourist rental quadricycle, a Quadricycle International Quad-3

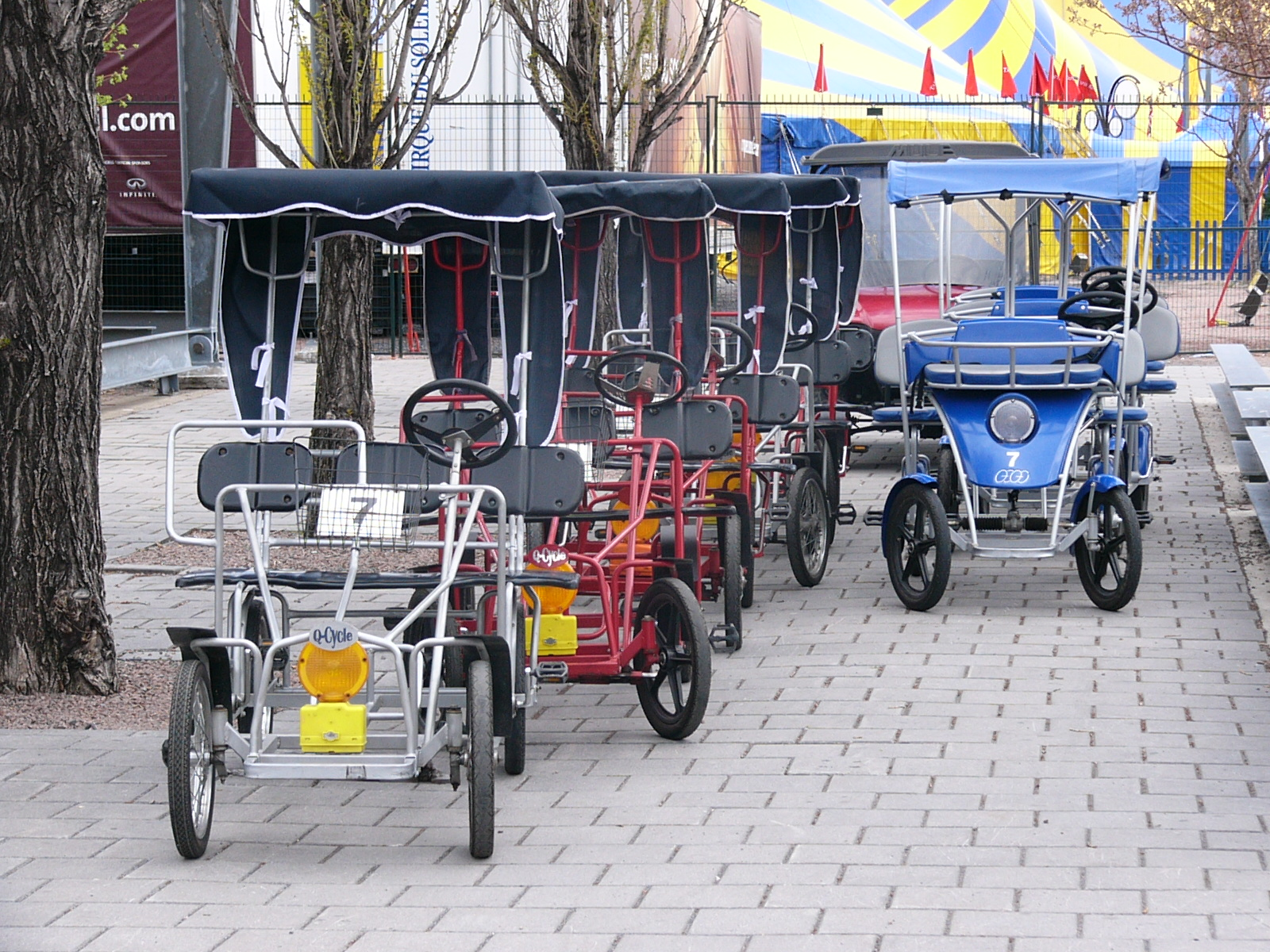
Quadricycle International tourist rental quadricycles, Old Montreal, Quebec, Canada

=== Pedal taxi ===
Similar to the surrey are pedal taxis or pedicabs. These tend to be four or even six seaters and are used as taxis, pedaled by professional drivers. Like the rental surreys, they are often found at tourist attractions and in the downtown areas of tourist destination cities.

Also like the rental surreys, pedal taxis are often constructed to resemble early 20th century cars and often feature awning coverings for protection from the sun.

Examples of this type include:

- International Surrey Limousine
- Momentum Quadracycles MQ4 Cabbie
- Quadracycle Inc QuadraCab
- Delphino (Limo)

=== Touring ===
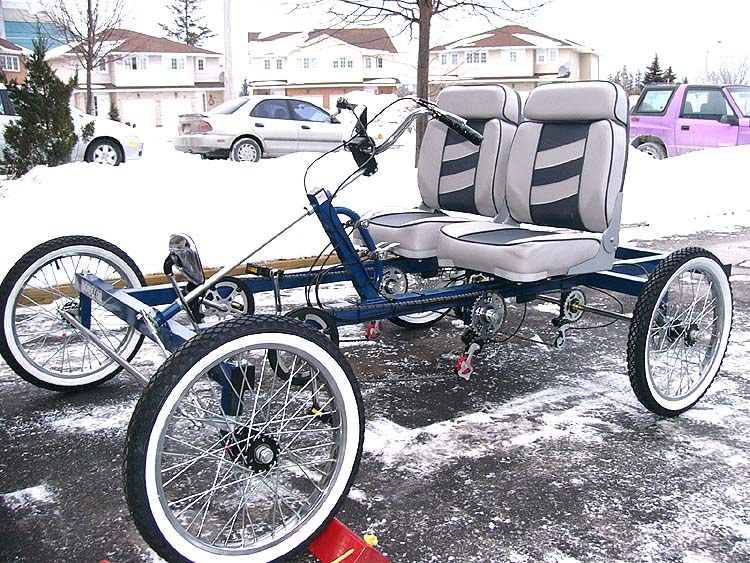
A modern 4-wheel touring bike - a 2007 model Rhoades Car 4W2PCP Coupe two seater

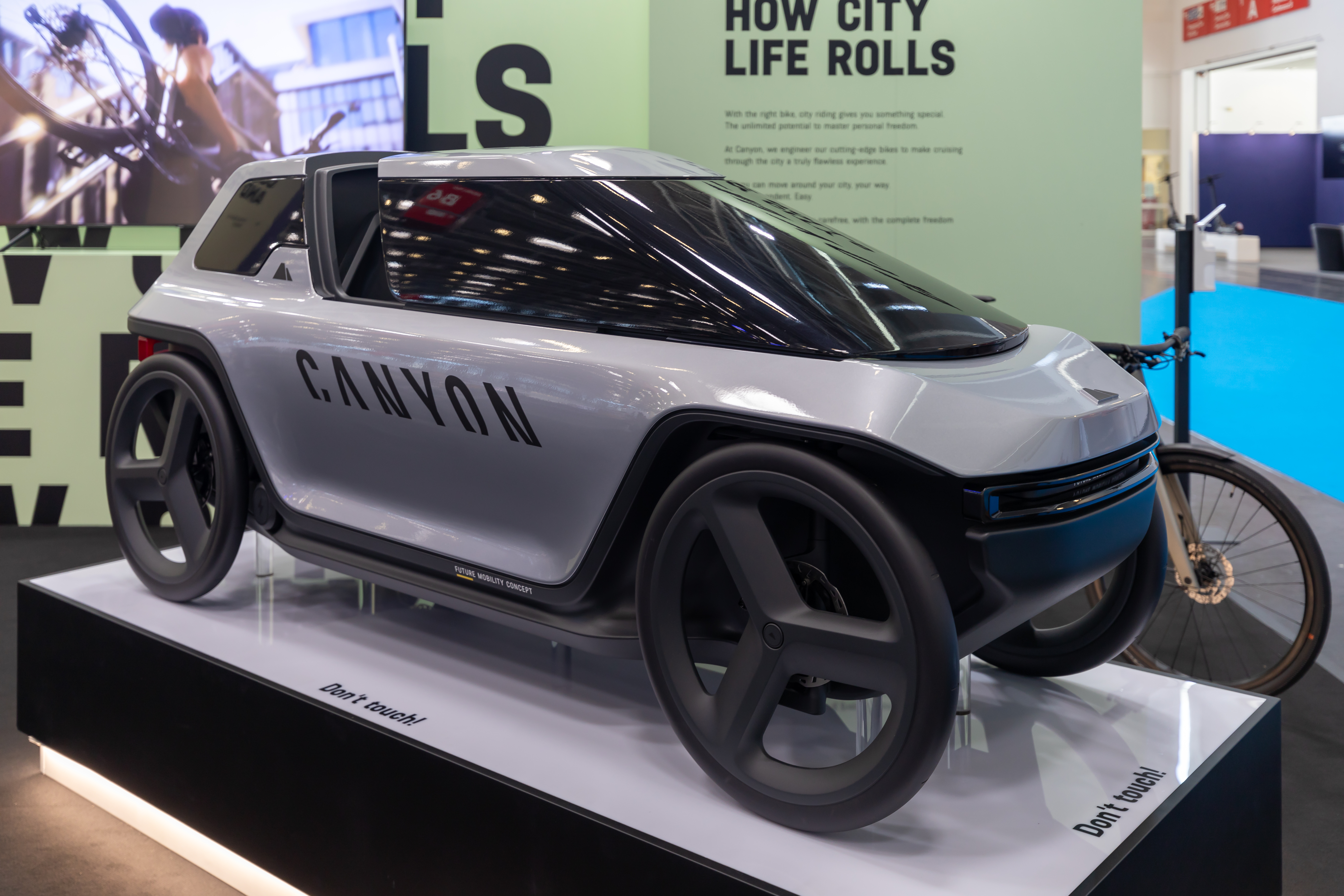
A modern German 4-wheel touring bike - a 2021 model

Touring quadracycles are constructed specifically for the personal ownership market and are built to be lighter and faster than rental surreys. Typically, they seat one or two people in side-by-side seating and feature independent pedaling and gear selection. They can have as low as 7 gear inches, giving them remarkable hill-climbing capabilities. They are used for long-distance travel as well as local use; some are used for cycle-commuting to work.

Compared to touring or hybrid bicycles, touring quadracycles are more comfortable to ride, can navigate steeper hills more easily, deal with crosswinds better, and can carry a much heavier load than a bicycle. They have disadvantages compared to bicycles including that they are heavier, require more storage space, typically have slower cruise speeds, are more complex to maintain, and have a larger turning circle. Unlike bicycles (but like tricycles) they are vulnerable to being rolled over on fast corners, and a very low centre of gravity and/or weight transfer by the riders to the inside of the curve is needed to avoid this.

Examples of this type of vehicle include:

- Lightfoot MicroCar
- Momentum Quadracycles MQ2 Leisure
- Pacific Cycle 2Rider
- Quadracycle International Little Deuce Coupe
- Quadracycle Inc QuadraSport two-seater
- QuattroVelo—a "speed"-class velomobile
- Rhoades Car 4W2PCP two-seater coupe
- RJK Ecological Car
- Steppe by Steppe Quike
- Ultimate Quadracycle CC-Sportster
- Utah Trikes Quad
- VierBike

There are also plans available as well as some amateur-designed touring quadracycles made by combining two bicycles. They have had varying degrees of success.

Examples of quadracycles built from plans are:

- Skeldon Bike Co. Granny Bike
- Atomic Zombie StreetFighter

=== Mountain quadracycles ===
Some quadracycles are designed to be the four-wheel counterparts of mountain bicycles and are optimized for strength and the ability to deal with steep and rough terrain; these are all single seat designs.

An example of this type is:

- Crank-It Mountain Quad

=== Industrial use ===
There are quadracycles designed for local delivery of goods, such as spare parts in a factory environment or laundry at spread-out hotel complexes. They may have two seats and a pickup box or flat bed to allow loads to be transported. Industrial use quadracycles are also capable of pulling small trailers.

Some quadracycles in this category have also been designed for military applications, such as light logistics transport.

Examples of this type of quadracycle include:

- Momentum Quadracycles MQ1 Industrial
- Rhoades Car 4W2PLF
- Rhoades Car Go Boy

=== Racing ===
Pedal Car Racing can be found in many parts of the world. The UK, France and Italy all have championships and the UK and Hong Kong have a 24-hour race every year. Racing pedal cars are lightweight machines built for the sole purpose of racing and are therefore unsuitable for road use.

=== Performance art ===
The El Arbol quadracycle was built as a portable stage and sound system to make a point about the use of fossil fuels for transportation.

== Security ==
Lacking the mass and door locks of automobiles, quadracycles are often secured in the same manner as bicycles with "U" or "D" locks, chains or cables to convenient stout objects such as fence posts, signs or bike racks.

== See also ==
- List of land vehicles types by number of wheels
- Cyclecar
- Cyclologistics
- Human-powered transport
- Outline of cycling
- Surrey
- Wheeled kicksled
- Quadricycle
- Quadricycle (EU vehicle classification)
