= Society of the Holy Trinity (disambiguation) =

The Society of the Holy Trinity is an Evangelical-Catholic Lutheran ministerium.

It may also refer to:

- The Order of the Holy Trinity (Ethiopia), an order of chivalry in Ethiopia.
- The Society of the Holy and Undivided Trinity, a former religious order in the Church of England.
- The Society of Our Lady of the Most Holy Trinity (SOLT), a Society of Apostolic Life within the Catholic Church.
- The Trinitarians, formally known as the Order of the Most Holy Trinity and of the Captives (OSsT), a mendicant order of the Catholic Church.
