= Society of the Holy and Undivided Trinity =

Former Anglican religious order

The Society of the Holy and Undivided Trinity was an Anglican religious order for women in England. It was notable for having been founded by Marian Hughes, the first woman to take religious vows in the Church of England since the Reformation. The Society operated from 1849 to 1956.

== History ==
Marian Hughes (1817–1912) was born in Shenington, Oxfordshire, where her father was the rector. She became the first woman to take religious vows in the Anglican church since the Reformation when she privately made them in 1841 to Edward Bouverie Pusey at the home of Ann and Charles Seager. She then took communion with John Henry Newman.

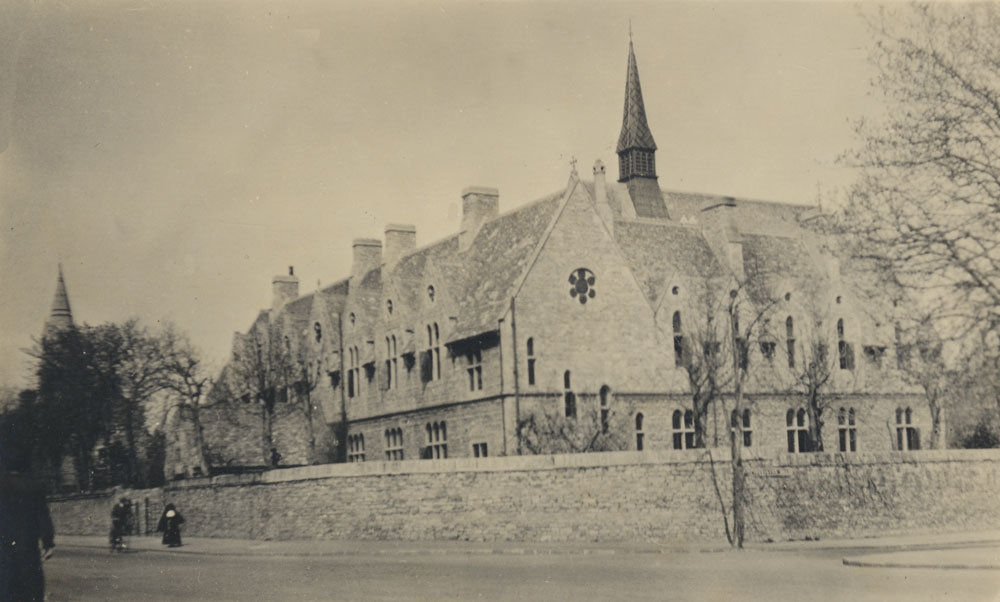
Postcard of the Convent started by Marian Hughes, view from Woodstock Road

Hughes established the Order in 1849. Although she was the first woman to profess, her order was not the first for women to be established: The Sisterhood of the Holy Communion had been established in New York in 1845 by Sister Anne Ayres; the Sisterhood of the Holy Cross (the Park Village Community) had also been established in North London in 1845; and the Rev Canon Thomas Chamberlain had established the Community of St Thomas the Martyr at St Thomas the Martyr's Church, Oxford in 1847.

In 1866, work started on a purpose-built convent on land on Woodstock Road bought from St John's College. Hughes funded the building. It was designed by local architect Charles Buckeridge. After initially proposing a circular design based on the symbolism of the Holy Trinity, Buckeridge took a more traditional approach and drew up the plans sometime before 1865. While initially there were plans to enlarge the convent with a northern extension, for which place was made in the building's design, further building never took place. The convent finally opened in November 1868. The total cost of the initial build was £8,000, a considerable sum at the time. It is said that upon first seeing the convent's new premises, the architect William Butterfield commented that it was the 'best modern building in Oxford after my college', by which he meant Keble. The chapel, by John Loughborough Pearson to Buckeridge's original design, was added in 1891–94; its apse was adorned with paintings by Charles Edgar Buckeridge (son of the original architect) and Ethel King Martyn.

Hughes died in 1912 at the convent in prayer. She and her nuns were buried in a special area reserved for the Society at St Sepulchre's Cemetery in Oxford. Her order operated until after the Second World War in 1956. In 1945, the sisters sold the convent and then bought a house but it was occupied by the British Council. In 1946, they were described in the Church Times as "homeless". At that point the sisters moved to South Leigh, where they remained until 1956 when the remaining nuns joined the Community of the Holy Name at Malvern Link.

== Schools ==
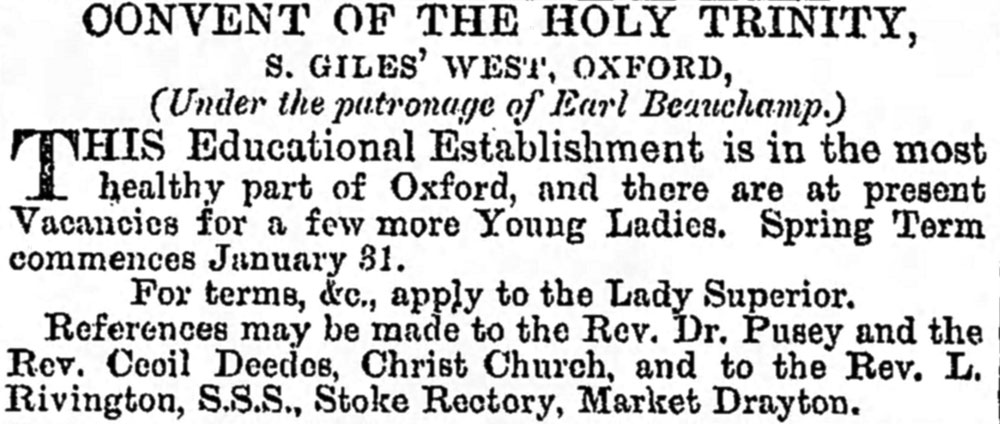
School advertisement, 1872

The convent staff organised several schools for girls and later another for boys. Hughes founded Holy Trinity Convent school in 1857; she also founded the Oxford Industrial school. The school was first housed at no. 10 St Giles and attended by boys, girls and infants. After a financial appeal, a new school was built behind the convent in 1876. It became the parochial girls' school of St Philip and St James' parish, locally known as St Denys's. As a 'Middle Class Day School' it was to provide a 'good and sound English Education' with a 'high-principled moral tone' to the daughters of college servants and small tradesmen, for 195 girls in Winchester Road. The patron was Earl Beauchamp, who had been one of the founders of Pusey House.

In 1926, juniors were transferred to St Giles' junior mixed and infant school and St Denys's turned into a school for senior girls only. The school was handed over to the parish in 1945, just before the closure of the Society. The Ministry of Education re-registered the school under the name of St Denys's, as it had been called unofficially since 1876. One committee managed both St Denys's girls' and SS Philip and James boys and infants schools. These parish schools ceased to exist when seniors were transferred to the newly opened Cherwell Secondary Modern School in 1963 and juniors to the Bishop Kirk junior mixed school in 1965. Bishop Kirk School, in turn, closed in 1990.

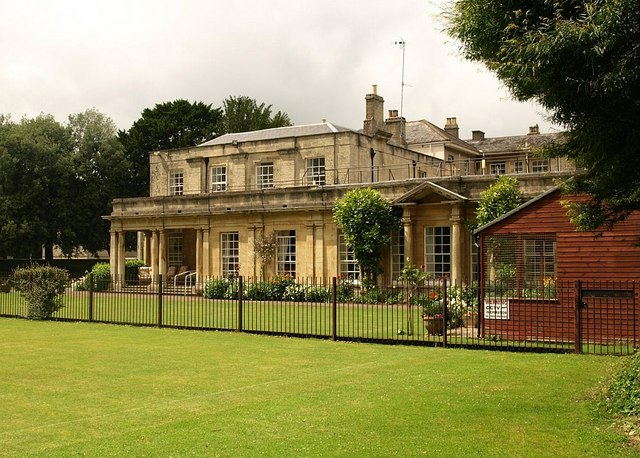
Watermoor House, the former St Michael's School in Cirencester

The sisters also ran St Michael's School, for girls from a professional background, originally in the north wing of the convent, and then, from the 1920s, in Cirencester. In Cirencester it occupied Watermoor House (in 2024 a residential home), which was next to Sir George Gilbert Scott's masterpiece, Holy Trinity, Watermoor. The school closed in the 1950s.

== Legacy ==
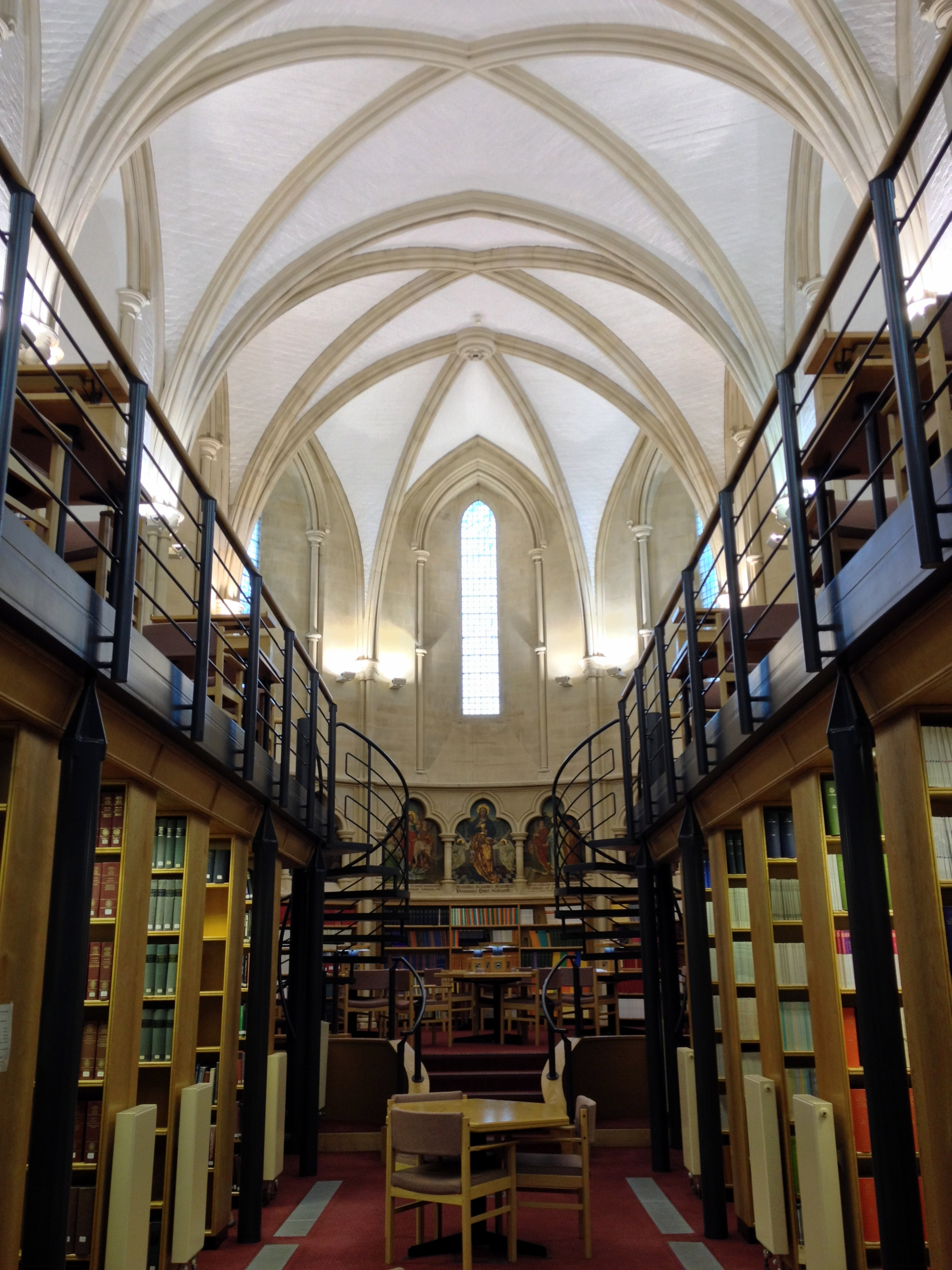
The St Antony's College library in the Old Main Building

The convent now forms the Old Main Building of St Antony's College. St Antony's acquired the former convent in 1950 after it had been vacated by the convent and the social club Halifax House, which had occupied the premises in the immediate post-war period. The building's chapel, which was built during the years 1891–1894 to Buckeridge's original design, now houses the college library. The three panel-paintings around the apse of the former chapel are by Charles Edgar Buckeridge. The main building's undercroft, now the Gulbenkian Reading Room, was initially used by the nuns as a refectory, a role it continued to play until the completion of the Hilda Besse building in 1970.

In 1933, on the anniversary of the Oxford Movement, Marian Hughes was one of 39 post-Reformation Anglicans proposed for canonization in the Oxford Centenary (Supplementary) Missal.

The Order's papers are held in Pusey House Library.
