= Charles Seager =

Charles Seager may refer to:

- Charles Seager (bishop) (1872–1948), Canadian priest who became Anglican Bishop of Ontario
- Charles Seager (orientalist) (1808–1878), English orientalist
