= Marian Hughes =

First Anglican mother superior (1817–1912)

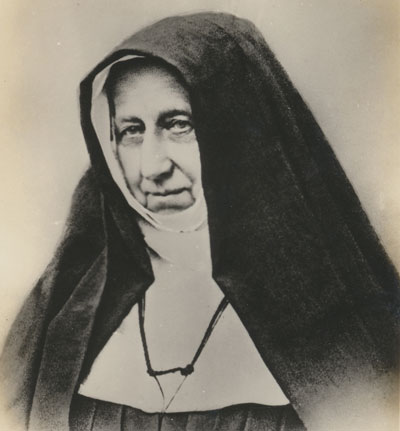
- Born: 14 January 1817; Shenington
- Died: 7 May 1912 (aged 95); Oxford
- Resting place: St Sepulchre's Cemetery
- Occupation: Superior (1851–)

Marian Rebecca Hughes (14 January 1817 – 7 May 1912) was the first woman to take religious vows in the Anglican church since the Reformation. She was mother superior of the Society of the Holy and Undivided Trinity, which she founded in Oxford. She also founded schools in Oxford for girls and boys.

== Life ==
Hughes was born in the Oxfordshire village of Shenington on 14 January 1817. Her parents were Martha Pyne and the Reverend Robert Edward Hughes. Her father was the rector of Shenington. She had a brother and sister and her cousin was Thomas Chamberlain who became vicar of St Thomas the Martyr's Church, Oxford.

She became the first woman to take religious vows in the Anglican church when she privately made them in 1841 to Edward Bouverie Pusey at the home of Ann and Charles Seager. She then took communion with John Henry Newman. Newman and Pusey were both fellows at Oriel College and leaders in the Oxford Movement.

After Hughes took her vows she went abroad to visit different Roman Catholic convents with Charles and Ann Seager. She was helped by Léon Thomine Desmazures who was the Canon of Bayeux Cathedral and Archdeacon of Caen. He directed 15 convents and he arranged for Hughes to ask questions of Ursuline nuns at Bayeux. She later went to the Convent of the Visitation at Caen where she, and later Pusey, were intrigued by the Rule of Francis de Sales.

In 1846 she was creating embroidered altar cloths which were used by Pusey at his home. These are extant and are at Pusey House.

She was the mother superior in Oxford from 1851.

In 1866 work started on a purpose-built convent on land bought from St John's College and the building was paid for by Hughes. It was designed by local architect Charles Buckeridge and it was complete by 1868. The convent staffed organised several schools for girls and later another for boys.

== Death and legacy ==
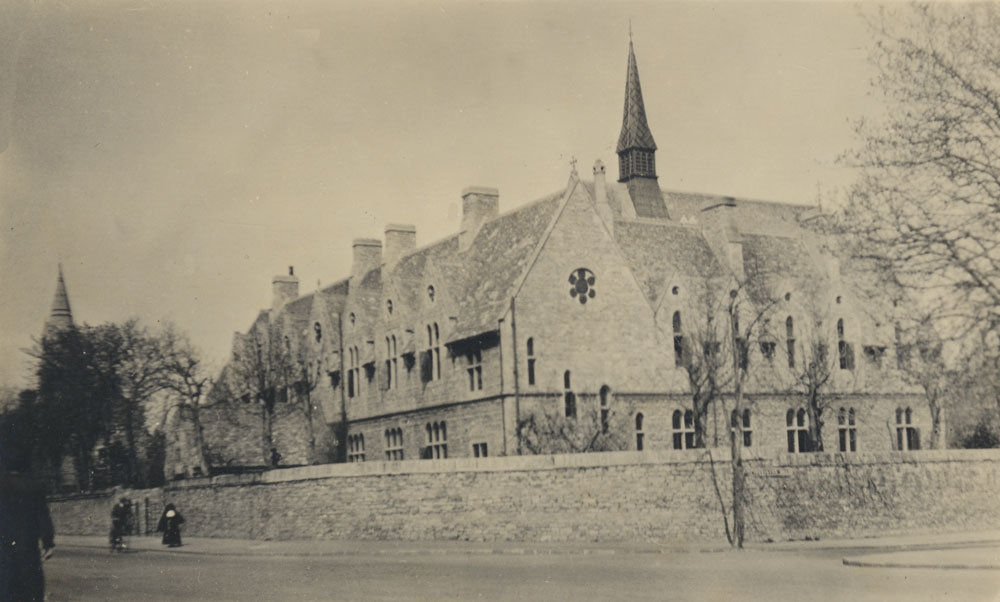
Postcard of the Convent she started

She died in 1912 at the convent in prayer. She and her nuns were buried in a special area reserved for the Society of the Holy and Undivided Trinity at St Sepulchre's Cemetery in Oxford.

In 1933, Marian Rebecca Hughes: Mother Foundress of the Society of the Holy and Undivided Trinity, Oxford was published. Her convent was operating until just after the second world war in 1946.

St Peter's, Eastern Hill, which is an Anglo-catholic church in Melbourne, has a stained glass window that features aspects of the Catholic revival up to the early 20th century. One of three panels shows Hughes giving her vows to Pusey.

In 2021 some of the textiles that she had embroidered were included in a Threads of Devotion exhibition. One was still in use at Pusey House chapel after 175 years. One of the items displayed was a doll dressed in a miniature outfit as worn by her nuns. This doll was created by Hughes.
