= International Surrey Company =

Quadracycle manufacturer

- Company type: Private company
- Industry: Cycle manufacturing
- Founded: 1970; 56 years ago
- Headquarters: Galveston, Texas, United States
- Products: Quadracycles

International Surrey Company Ltd., also called "The Surrey Company", is a quadracycle manufacturer based in La Marque, Texas, United States. The company began production in the mid-1980s and specializes in providing products for the quadracycle rental market.

== History ==
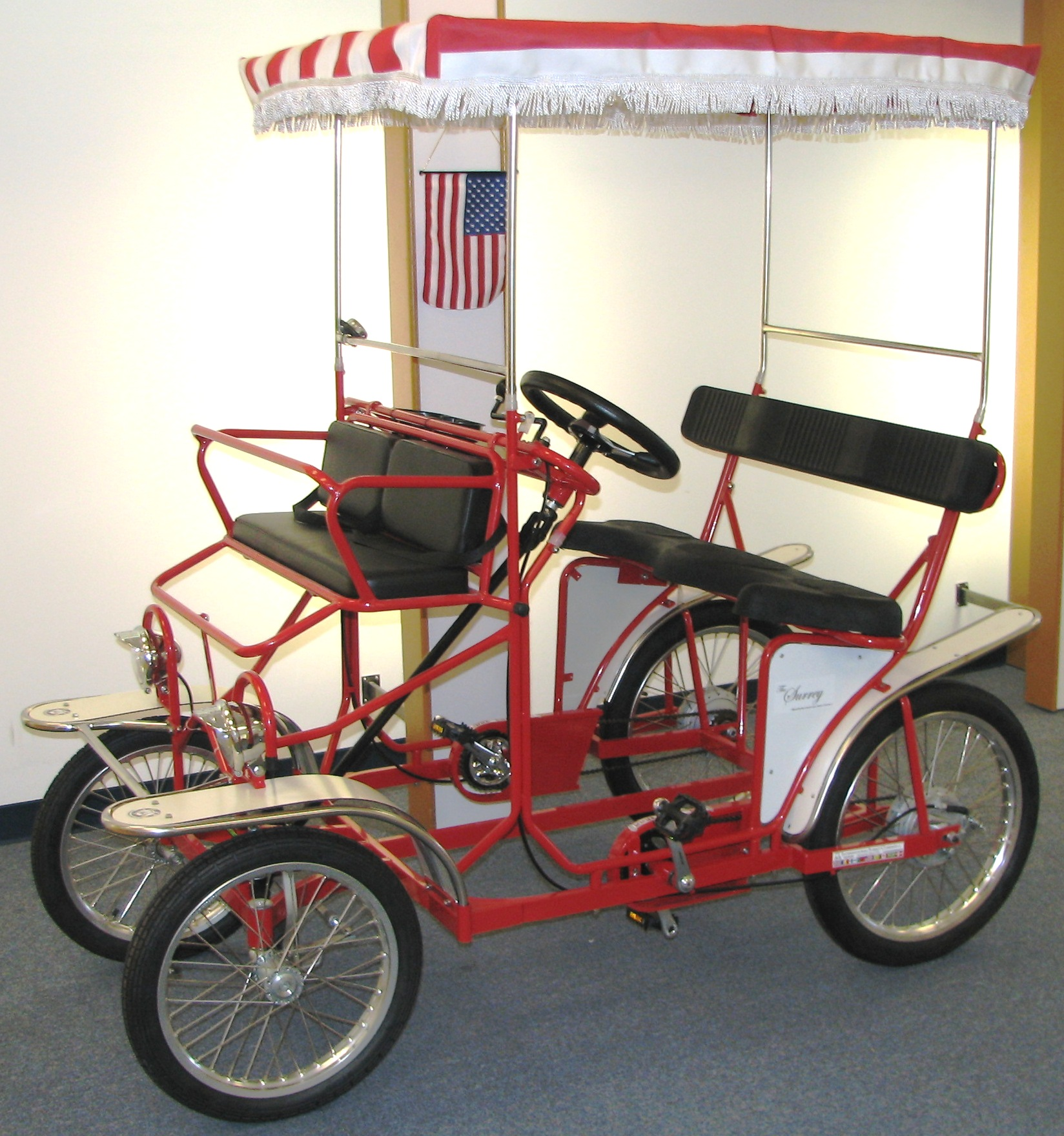
A 2008 model International Surrey Company DX Series 4 wheel Surrey quadracycle designed for 2 or 3 adult people and 2 small children, available with up to 7 speeds

The company was formed as a quadracycle rental operator in 1970 under the name The Surrey Company with locations in Kissimmee, Florida and Galveston, Texas. The company also operated an affiliate under the name Beach Bike Rentals. They rented out the French Gitane Rosalie and the Italian bolt-together framed Selene Surrey.

The renting of quadracycles was found to be very hard on the imported models and the quadracycles suffered equipment failures as a result. The Surrey Company made improved replacement parts, such as awnings and frames for these models and suggested improvements to the European manufacturers.

By the mid-1980s the company found that it was economical to build their own complete quadracycles and decided to become a manufacturing operation. In 1996 the company started shipping products outside the United States for the first time and changed their name to International Surrey Company to reflect this new market focus.

== Design and uses ==
Quadracycles started out as leisure vehicles, but in the 21st century many are now used as a sustainable transportation alternative for short trips to neighborhood stores and schools.

The company now offers Surreys with a newly developed 7 speed transmission.

== Products Offered ==
=== Current products ===
- OS Series Surrey
- DX Series Surrey
- California Cruzer
- OS Series Surrey Limousine
- DX Series Surrey Limousine
- Surrey Stretch Limousine Bike

=== Products under development ===
- Bullet Trike
- Surrey Tram
- Roadrunner
- Surrey Special edition
- Surrey Taxi
