= Rhoades Car =

American quadracycle manufacturer

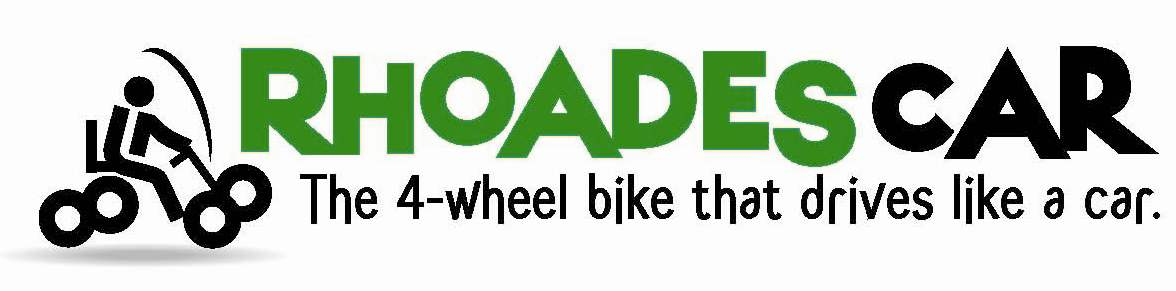
- Type: Private company
- Industry: Cycle manufacturing
- Founded: 1991; 35 years ago
- Founder: David Rhoades, President 1992-2009
- Headquarters: Perrysburg, Ohio, United States
- Key people: Jared Parseghian, Chris Spann, Master Builder Jim Stennett, General Manager
- Products: Quadracycles
- Parent: Par Bikes, LLC
- Website: www.vierbike.com

Rhoades Car, founded in 1991, is located in Hendersonville, Tennessee, United States. The company was founded by David Rhoades, and he served as its president until his death in late 2009 from heart disease at age 60. He was succeeded as president by Bill Pomakoy in 2010 who renamed the company "Rhoades Car International". Ownership changed hands again on October 1, 2015, and was part of Mobile Specialty Group, Inc. In January 2020, the assets were purchased by Par Bikes, LLC. Par Bikes also purchased VierBike, a company with a similar, but more luxurious four wheel bike design.

Rhoades Car's sole products are a line of four-wheel bikes, also known as quadracycles. The company markets these products under the slogan “The 4-wheel bike that drives like a car!”.

Rhoades Car is one of the world's largest quadracycle manufacturers.

== Construction ==
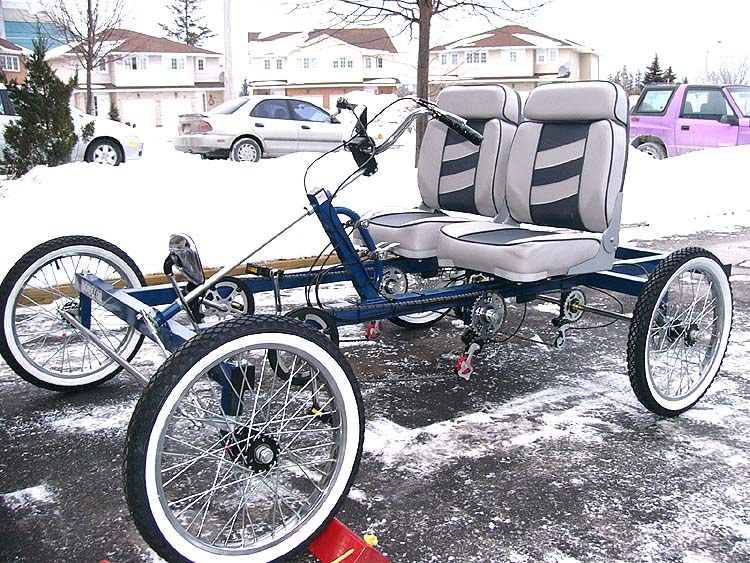
2007 model Rhoades Car 4W2PCP Coupe quadracycle

All Rhoades Car bikes are made from welded square 2×2-inch 0.0598-inch (14-gauge) steel tubes. They feature 20×2.125-inch wheels. The two- and four-seat models have independent pedaling, with compound transmissions of up to 42 gears available.

== Products ==
The company's current product line includes:

- 4W1P – single-seat quadracycle
- 4W2PCP Coupe – two-seat side-by-side quadracycle
- 4W2PLF – two-seat long-frame quadracycle with longer cargo area
- 4W4P – four-seat quadracycle
- e-one SportPed – single-seat electric-assist quadracycle
- e-two SportPed – two-seat electric-assist quadracycle
- e-four SportPed - four-seat electric-assist quadracycle
- Go-Boy – industrial-use quadracycles
- Rhoades Solaride - 2 and 4 person versions
- Rhoades ComfortRide - one person quadracycle with 20" wide seat
