= Shenington Airfield =

Airfield in Oxfordshire, England

- IATA: none; ICAO: none

Summary
- Airport type: Private
- Owner: Shenington Airfield Ltd
- Location: Shenington, Oxfordshire
- Opened: October 1941
- Coordinates: 52°4′56″N 001°28′29″W
- Website: https://www.sheningtonairfield.com/
- Interactive map of Shenington Airfield

Shenington Airfield, previously known as RAF Edgehill, is an Aerodrome located west of Shenington, Oxfordshire. It is owned by Shenington Airfield Ltd, and leases use of the site to various organisations, predominantly the Edgehill Gliding Centre.

== Royal Air Force use ==
Initially Shenington Airfield was opened as RAF Edgehill in October 1941 with No. 21 Operational Training Unit (OTU) being based at the airfield operating Vickers Wellingtons, Miles Martinets and Hawker Hurricanes also No. 12 OTU were based at the airfield as well. No. 1 Flying Training School RAF also used Edgehill at some point.

The airfield was also used for the flight testing of the Gloster E28/39 in 1942 after it had made its maiden flights at RAF Cranwell.

After the war it became a storage depot. After a brief period as a Flying Training School, it finally closed as an RAF station in 1953.

=== Accidents and incidents ===
Date	Incident	Reference
4 October 1941	Vickers Wellington R1146 of 21 OTU flew into trees near Edgehill.	
22 May 1942	Avro Anson N9565 of 3 Air Observers School hit HT wires near Edgehill	
29 January 1943	Wellington HF650 of 22 OTU stalled and crashed at Edgehill	
7 June 1944	A Douglas C-47 Skytrain (possibly 43-15048) of 49 TCS, 313 TCG crashed on approach	

== Civilian use ==
Currently the site is used by the Edgehill Gliding Centre, previously known as the "Shenington Gliding Club", though other companies are resident on the site as well. Private aircraft are able to organise flying into the site, however due to the intense use of the airspace and site by gliding operations this is not a significant element of operations.

Gliding has occurred at Shenington airfield in various forms since 1984, but then in 1991 Shenington Gliding Club formed operating daily. It is a mix of both paid and volunteer instruction, and a number of private aircraft are based at the club.

Edgehill Gliding Centre, previously known as Shenington Gliding Club, is a British gliding club near the village of Shenington in the Cotswolds, seven miles north west of Banbury. The club changed its name to Edgehill Gliding Centre in 2022, but still operates from Shenington Airfield.

The club has two K13, a K21, a K8, a motor glider, two lpg powered winches and a tug. There are numerous privately owned gliders.

The club hosts trial lessons for visitors and runs courses with professional instructors from March to October.
