= Praeparatio evangelica =

313 CE Christian apologetics by Eusebius

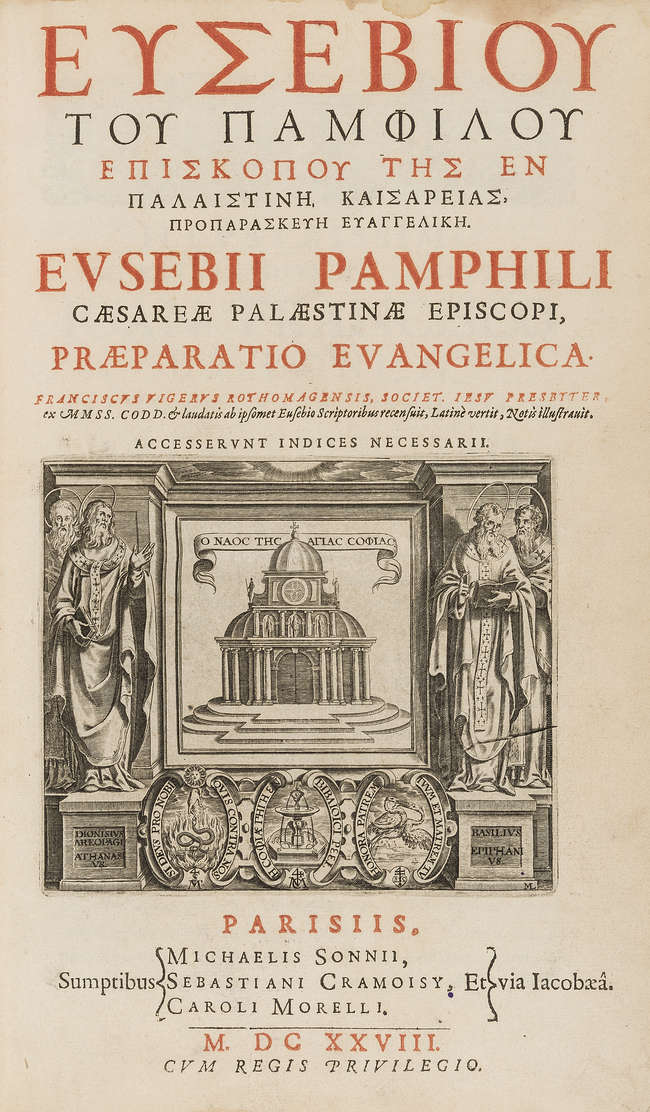
Eusebius - Praeparatio evangelica

Preparation for the Gospel (Ancient Greek: Εὐαγγελικὴ προπαρασκευή, Euangelikē proparaskeuē), commonly known by its Latin title Praeparatio evangelica, is a work of Christian apologetics written by Eusebius in the early part of the fourth century AD. It was begun about the year 313, and attempts to prove the excellence of Christianity over pagan religions and philosophies. It was dedicated to Bishop Theodotus of Laodicea.

Eusebius devotes a considerable portion of the work to explaining what he sees as a debt that Greek philosophers owed to Hebrew culture.

== Contents ==
The Praeparatio consists of fifteen books completely preserved. Eusebius considered it an introduction to Christianity for pagans. It remains a valuable resource for classicists because Eusebius excerpts historians and philosophers not preserved elsewhere.

Among the most important of these otherwise lost works are:

- Excerpts from Timon of Phlius' book Python including what is known as the Aristocles Passage in which Pyrrho summarizes his new philosophy of Pyrrhonism.
- A summary of the writings of the Phoenician priest Sanchuniathon; its accuracy has been shown by the mythological accounts found on the Ugaritic texts.
- The account of Euhemerus's wondrous voyage to the island of Panchaea, where Euhemerus purports to have found his true history of the gods, which was taken from Diodorus Siculus's sixth book.
- Excerpts from the writings of the Platonist philosopher Atticus.
- Excerpts from the writings of the Middle Platonist philosopher Numenius of Apamea.
- Excerpts from the works of Porphyry, the Neoplatonist critic of Christianity ("On Images", "Philosophy from Oracles" "Letter to Anebo", "Against the Christians", "Against Boethus", "Philological Lecture").
- Excerpts from the Book of the Laws of the Countries (also known as the Dialogue on Fate) by the early Christian author Bardaisan of Edessa, the Syriac original of which was not discovered until the 19th century.

== Influence ==
This work was used by Giovanni Pico della Mirandola (1463–1494) as a resource for his well-known oration A Speech by Giovanni Pico della Mirandola, Prince of Concord.

The first Latin translation of the Praeparatio was made by George of Trebizond and printed at Venice by Nicolas Jenson in 1470. The Jesuit François Viger also translated the text into Latin for his edition with commentary of 1628.

== Meaning of "praeparatio evangelica" ==
The term also denotes an early church doctrine, praeparatio evangelica, meaning a preparation for the gospel among cultures yet to hear of the message of Christ. "[Early Christians] argued that God had already sowed the older cultures with ideas and themes that would grow to fruition once they were interpreted in a fully Christian context." Eusebius' own Praeparatio Evangelica does not adopt the common notion (which occurs at least as early as Clement of Alexandria) of Greek philosophy as a "preparation for the Gospel." Eusebius instead offers a lengthy argument for the wisdom of the ancient Hebrews becoming a preparation for Greek philosophy (at least Platonic philosophy, see Praep.ev. 11–13). For Eusebius, the Greeks stole any truths they possessed from the "more ancient" Hebrews.
