= Gendron, Inc. =

American medical equipment manufacturer

Gendron, Inc. (originally Gendron Iron Wheel Company) is an American manufacturer of wheelchairs, hospital beds, stretchers, and other medical equipment based in Bryan, Ohio.

== History ==
The Gendron Iron Wheel Company was founded in 1872 in Toledo, Ohio by Peter Gendron (born Pierre Gendron, 1844–1910). Gendron originally produced wire wheels for baby carriages. In 1890, it produced bicycles, tricycles, invalid chairs, baby carriages, doll carriages, coaster wagons, toy wheelbarrows, and children's diecast toy replica pedal cars up until World War II.

In 1927, Gendron became a subsidiary of American-National. American-National was formed as a holding company for three companies: Toledo Metal Wheel, National Wheel, and American Wheel. American-National, Toledo, and Gendron products were sold under the trade names of Pioneer, Skippy, Express, Reliance, Hi-Speed, Hi-Way, Speed King, Blue Streak, Sampson, American, and Streamline.

In the late 1930s, American-National had financial difficulties. In 1941, the assets and all rights to the product line were purchased by a group of Toledo industrialists headed by Walter H. Diemer, who had previously been the President of American-National. The new company was incorporated as the Gendron Wheel Company and moved to Perrysburg, Ohio. The company was organized "to manufacture, import, export, buy, sell, and in general deal in wheelchairs, playground equipment, and other juvenile conveniences of every kind".

All of American-National's plants were closed except the Gendron Perrysburg plant. Due to the war effort, Gendron concentrated its efforts on wheelchairs and hospital stretchers. However, it continued to manufacture wooden wagons and playground equipment. Catalogs from the 1950s and early 1960s show playground equipment and hand car racers with the trade name Howdy Doody.

In 1959, Gendron Wheel moved most of its manufacturing to Archbold, Ohio. The Perrysburg plant was closed in 1963. In 1964, the company became a subsidiary of Howmedica. However the Gendron trademark continued. In 1971, Mr. Robert Diemer and Mr. Richard A. Bigelow purchased the company and it became Gendron-Diemer. In 1975, Richard A. Bigelow purchased Mr. Diemer's interest and the company became Gendron, Inc. In 1997, Mr. Bigelow sold the company to Steven W. Cotter, Thomas A. Dewire, and Frederic W. Strobel.

Gendron, Inc. currently produces mobile patient management systems for transport, trauma treatment, imaging, bariatric, and special procedures.
