= Shenington with Alkerton =

Coordinates: 52.082°N 1.451°W

- Civil parish
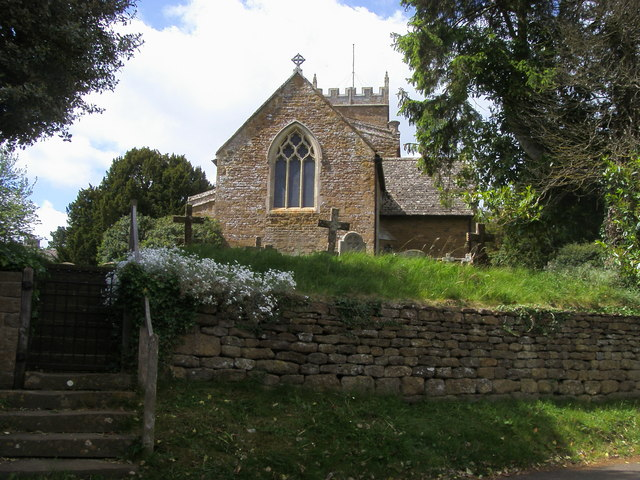
- Shenington church

- Location within Oxfordshire
- Population: 425 (2011 census)
- Civil parish: Shenington with Alkerton
- District: Cherwell
- Shire county: Oxfordshire
- Region: South East
- Country: England
- Sovereign state: United Kingdom
- Post town: Banbury
- Postcode district: OX15
- Dialling code: 01295
- Police: Thames Valley
- Fire: Oxfordshire
- Ambulance: South Central
- UK Parliament: Banbury

Shenington with Alkerton is a civil parish in the Cherwell district, in the county of Oxfordshire, England. It comprises the village of Shenington, which was an exclave of Gloucestershire until the Counties (Detached Parts) Act 1844 transferred it to Oxfordshire (grid reference SP370425) and the village of Alkerton, which was always part of Oxfordshire (grid reference SP375425). It covers 9.60 km^{2} and as at the 2011 census had a population of 425 people.

== Sources ==
- Lobel, Mary D. and Crossley, Alan (Eds.) (1969). Victoria County History: A History of the County of Oxford: Volume 9: Bloxham Hundred.
