= Pierre François le Courayer =

French Catholic theological writer

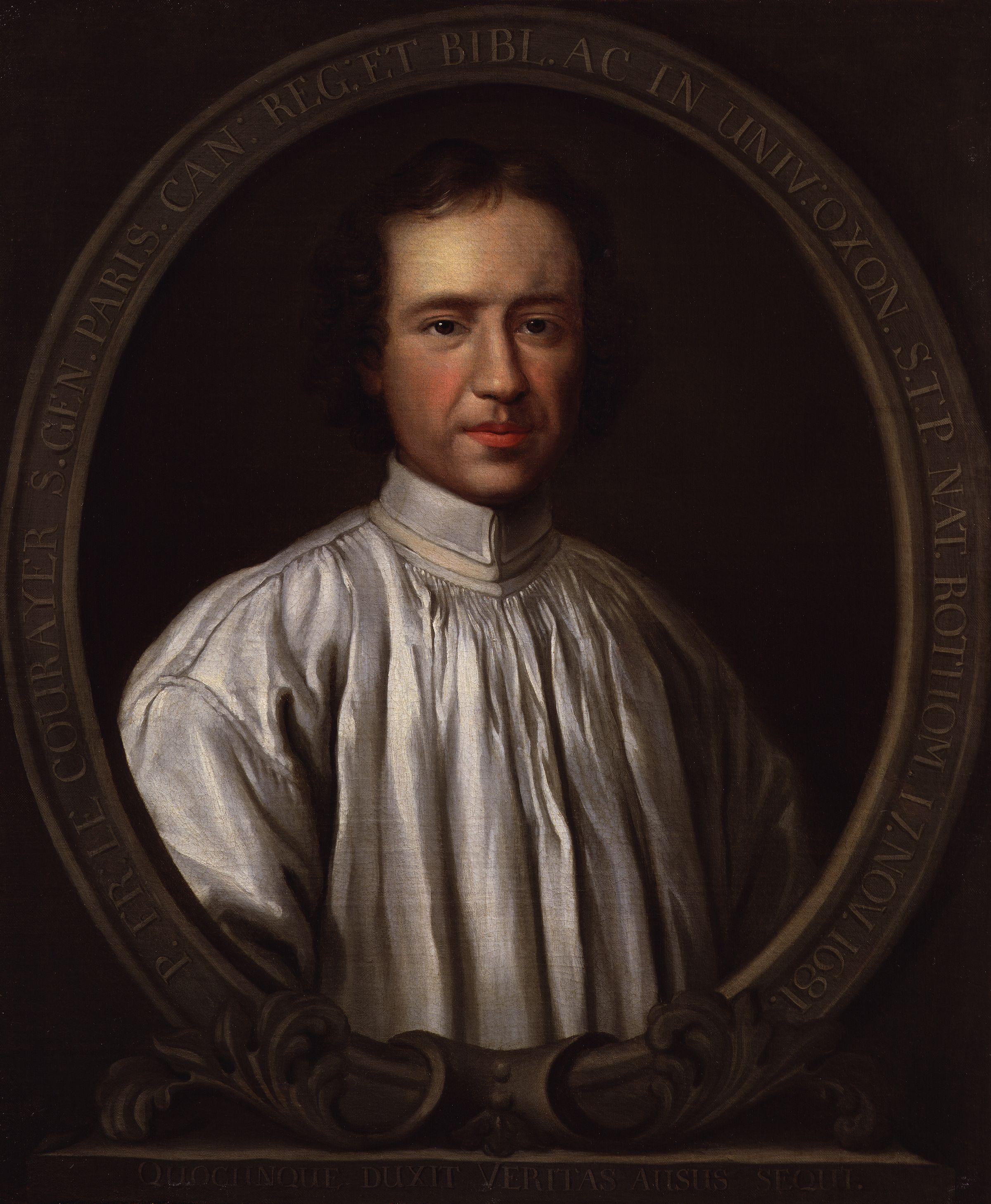
Pierre François Le Courayer

Pierre François le Courayer (17 November 1681 – 17 October 1776) was a French Catholic theological writer, for many years an expatriate in England.

== Life ==
Pierre François le Courayer was born at Rouen. While canon regular and librarian of the abbey of St Genevieve at Paris, he conducted a correspondence with Archbishop William Wake on the subject of episcopal succession in England. He published an anonymous book on the area in 1723. The following year he wrote to the Journal des savants to put his name to the work. His opinions exposed him to attacks from several theologians, and a prosecution, with 32 of his propositions being labelled heresies. He was rebuked by Louis Antoine de Noailles, archbishop of Paris then excommunicated by Jean XI Polinier, abbot of Sainte-Geneviève.

Le Courayer did not recant his opinions. They had gained him supporters in Great Britain, and with the help of Francis Atterbury, then in exile in Paris, he left for. England. There he was presented with a doctor's degree by the University of Oxford.

In 1732 Le Courayer accepted that reconciliation with his opponents in France was impossible, and he settled permanently in London. He was granted a canonry in Oxford. In his will, dated two years before his death, he declared himself still a member of the Roman Catholic Church, but one dissenting from many of its opinions. He died in London, and was buried in the cloisters of Westminster Abbey.

== Works ==
Using the correspondence with Wake, Le Courayer authored Dissertation sur la validité des ordinations des Anglais et sur la succession des évéques de l'Eglise anglicane, avec les preuves justificatives des faits avancés (Dissertation on the validity of the Englishmen's ordinations and on the episcopal succession in the Anglican Church, with the justificatory proofs of the facts advanced), published anonymously in 1723 with a fake publication location of Brussels. The work was an attempt to prove that there has been no break in the line of ordination from the apostles to the clergy of the Church of England. An English edition by Charles Seager was published in 1844.

In 1736 Le Courayer published a French translation of Paolo Sarpi's History of the Council of Trent, and dedicated it to Queen Caroline, from whom he received a pension of £200 a year. Besides this, he translated Johann Sleidan's History of the Reformation, and wrote several theological works.
