= Alkerton, Oxfordshire =

Village in Oxfordshire, England

Coordinates: 52.085°N 1.451°W

Alkerton
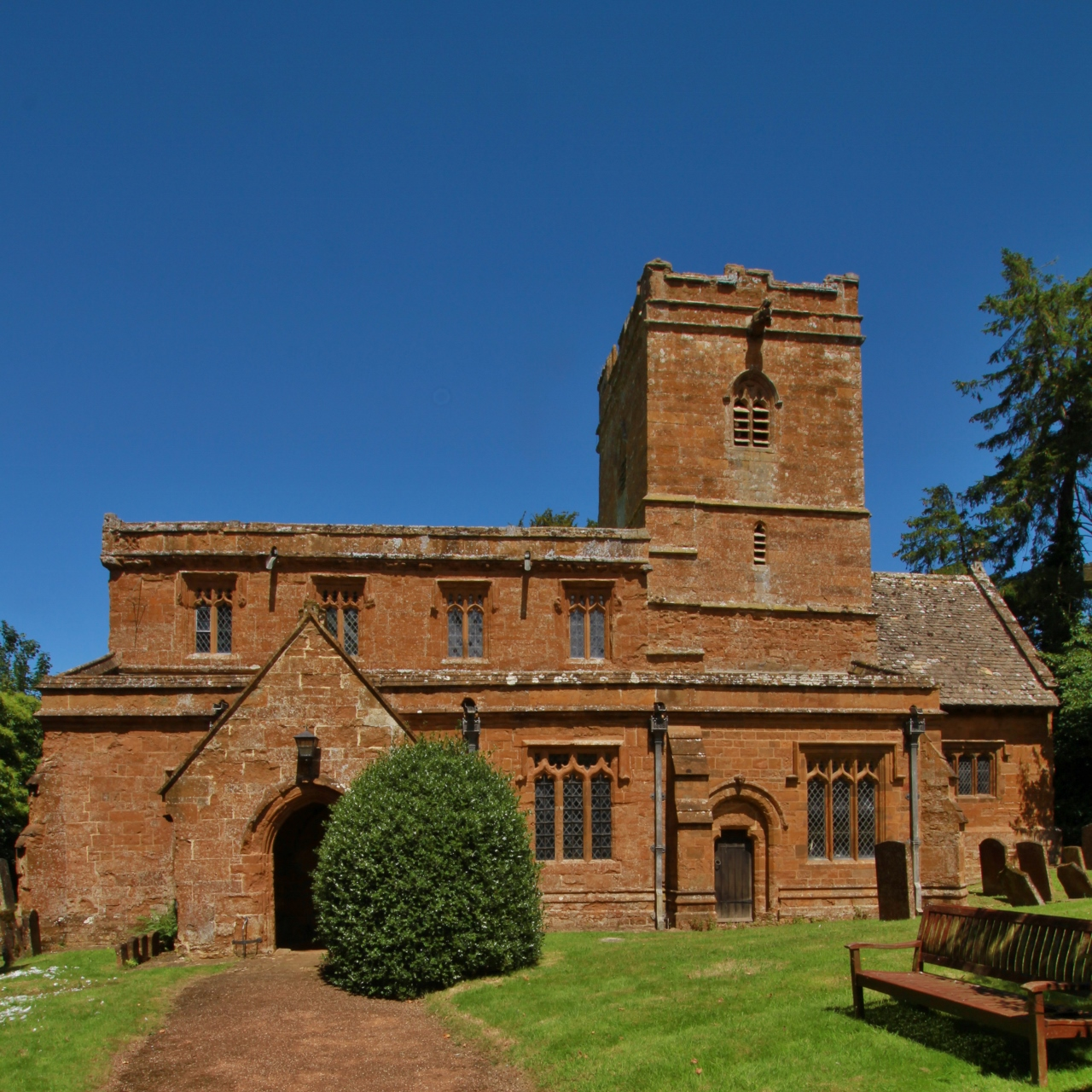
- Parish church of St Michael and All Angels

- Location within Oxfordshire
- OS grid reference: SP3742
- Civil parish: Shenington with Alkerton
- District: Cherwell
- Shire county: Oxfordshire
- Region: South East
- Country: England
- Sovereign state: United Kingdom
- Post town: Banbury
- Postcode district: OX15
- Dialling code: 01295
- Police: Thames Valley
- Fire: Oxfordshire
- Ambulance: South Central
- UK Parliament: Banbury (UK Parliament constituency)
- Website: Shenington with Alkerton Parish

Alkerton is a village in the civil parish of Shenington with Alkerton, in the Cherwell district of Oxfordshire, England. It is on the county boundary with Warwickshire, about 5 miles (8 km) west of Banbury.

== History ==
The Domesday Book records that in 1086 Alkerton had two main manors. Miles Crispin held the larger manor as part of the Honour of Wallingford. Odo, Bishop of Bayeux, William the Conqueror's half-brother, held the smaller manor.

Alkerton was an ancient parish in the Bloxham hundred of Oxfordshire. In 1970 the parish was merged with Shenington to form a new civil parish called Shenington with Alkerton. At the 1961 census (the last before the abolition of the civil parish), Alkerton had a population of 82.

== Parish church ==
The oldest parts of the Church of England parish church of St Michael and All Angels are the lower stages of the central bell tower, which date from the 12th century in the Transitional style between Norman and Early English Gothic. Towards the end of the 12th century the south aisle was added, linked with the nave by an Early English Gothic arcade of two bays. Early in the 13th century the east and west arches of the central tower were replaced with Early English Gothic ones. A stone effigy of a knight in an early 13th-century style was presumably added about the same time.

Early in the 14th century, the upper stages of the bell tower and the nave were rebuilt. Late in the 14th century a clerestory was added to the nave. The exterior of the clerestory is elaborately decorated with figures of men and animals carved from Hornton stone. The style of carving belongs to a school of 14th century north Oxfordshire masons whose work survives also at Adderbury, Bloxham and Hanwell.

Early in the 17th century the rector, the mathematician Thomas Lydiat, had the chancel rebuilt in the Perpendicular Gothic style. In 1889 the architect JA Cossins restored the church building and added an organ chamber south of the tower and east of the south aisle. St Michael's is now a Grade I listed building. The tower has a chime of four bells but they are not currently ringable. The oldest bell was cast in about 1400 and another was cast in 1618. St Michael's is now one of eight ecclesiastical parishes in the Ironstone Benefice.

== Social and economic history ==
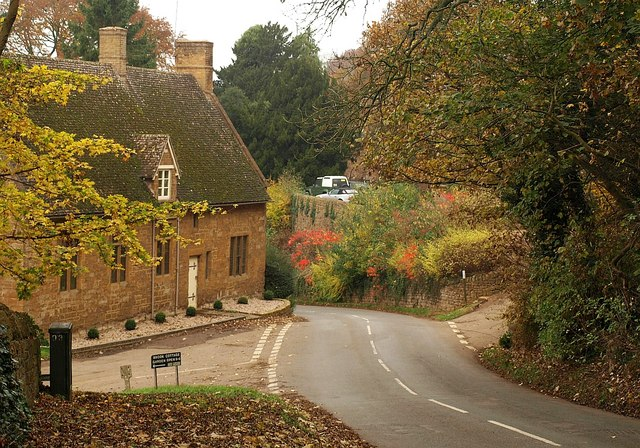
The road into Alkerton from the southeast

Thomas Lydiat was descended from Christopher Lydiat of London, who bought Alkerton manor house in 1567. Thomas Lydiat became rector of Alkerton in 1612 and had the rectory built in 1625. By 1624 Alkerton had a watermill, presumably on Sor Brook. It was absent from village records by 1778. An open field system prevailed in the parish until 1777, when an Act of Parliament was passed for its common lands to be enclosed.

The main road between Banbury and Stratford-upon-Avon passes through the northeast part of the former parish of Alkerton. It was made into a turnpike in 1743–44. Since the 1920s it has been classified as part of the A422 road. In 1782 Alkerton had a public house, the White Lion. An elementary school was established in Alkerton as a National School, but it failed to attract as many children as it was intended to serve. In 1905 it was closed and its children were transferred to the larger National School in neighbouring Shenington. By 1959 the Oxfordshire Ironstone Company was a major owner of land around Alkerton.

== Amenities ==
Alkerton's nearest public house, the Bell Inn, is in neighboring Shenington 0.2 miles (0.32 km) Northest of the main settlement, on the main A422 road is an Indian restaurant The Indian Queen (formally the New Inn).

== Sources ==
- Lobel, Mary D; Crossley, Alan, eds. (1969). A History of the County of Oxford. Victoria County History. Vol. 9: Bloxham Hundred. London: Oxford University Press for the Institute of Historical Research. pp. 44–53. ISBN 978-0-19722-726-8.
- Sherwood, Jennifer; Pevsner, Nikolaus (1974). Oxfordshire. The Buildings of England. Harmondsworth: Penguin Books. pp. 420–421. ISBN 0-14-071045-0.
