= Shenington =

Village in Oxfordshire, England

Coordinates: 52°04′56″N 1°27′31″W

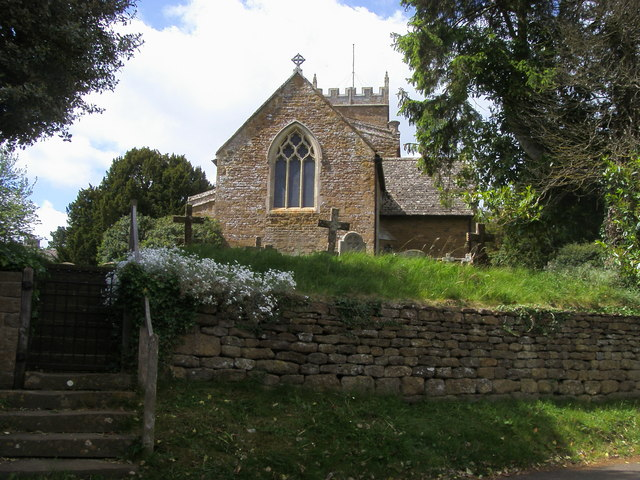
- Holy Trinity parish church

- Location within Oxfordshire
- OS grid reference: SP3742
- Civil parish: Shenington with Alkerton
- District: Cherwell
- Shire county: Oxfordshire
- Region: South East
- Country: England
- Sovereign state: United Kingdom
- Post town: Banbury
- Postcode district: OX15
- Dialling code: 01295
- Police: Thames Valley
- Fire: Oxfordshire
- Ambulance: South Central
- UK Parliament: Banbury
- Website: Shenington with Alkerton Parish

Shenington is a village in the civil parish of Shenington with Alkerton, in the Cherwell district of Oxfordshire, England. It is about 5 miles (8 km) west of Banbury. Shenington was an exclave of Gloucestershire until 1844, when it was transferred to Oxfordshire. Shenington is on Oxfordshire's boundary with Warwickshire.

== Toponym ==
The Domesday Book of AD 1086 records the toponym as Senendone. In a pipe roll from 1195 it appears as Senedon. Another Medieval charter now in the British Museum records it as Schenindon. Another recorded form is Shenedon. Different possible etymologies are suggested for the first element of the toponym. One is that it was from Sciena, a man's name, and that Shenlow Hill might be his burial mound. Another is that it is from the Old English scēne meaning "beautiful".

== History ==
By the 11th century the manor of Shenington was part of the lordship of Tewkesbury in Gloucestershire. Before the Norman Conquest of England the manor was held by the English thegn Brictric son of Algar. After the Norman Conquest Brictric's lands, including Shenington, were granted to Queen Matilda. When she died in 1083 her husband William the Conqueror inherited her estates, and the Domesday Book records that in 1086 Robert D'Oyly was farming Shenington for the King. In about 1087 William II granted the honour of Gloucester, including Shenington, to a Norman baron called Robert Fitzhamon.

In 1194 Shenington was amongst lands confiscated for the Crown after Prince John's attempted overthrow of Richard. After 1197 Shenington was again included with Gloucester in lands that King John granted to the 1st Earl of Gloucester. When the 4th Earl of Gloucester was killed at the Battle of Bannockburn in 1314, Shenington was divided between two of his sisters, Margaret de Clare and Eleanor de Clare.

Margaret, widow of Piers Gaveston received three fifths of the manor of Shenington. In 1317 Hugh de Audley, 1st Earl of Gloucester became Margaret's second husband, and on Audley's death in 1347 their estates passed to their son-in-law Ralph Stafford, 1st Earl of Stafford. This part of Shenington remained with the Staffords until at least 1460, when it was among the possessions of Humphrey Stafford, 1st Duke of Buckingham. Eleanor, wife of Hugh Despenser the Younger received the remaining two fifths of Shenington. This part of Shenington remained with their heirs until at least 1420, when part of it was held by Richard de Beauchamp, 1st Earl of Worcester, son-in-law of Isabel le Despenser, Countess of Worcester and Warwick.

Shenington was an ancient parish, which historically formed an exclave of Gloucestershire. It was transferred to Oxfordshire under the Counties (Detached Parts) Act 1844. In 1970 Shenington was merged with the neighbouring parish of Alkerton to form a new civil parish called Shenington with Alkerton. At the 1961 census (the last before the abolition of the civil parish), Shenington had a population of 232.

== Church and chapel ==
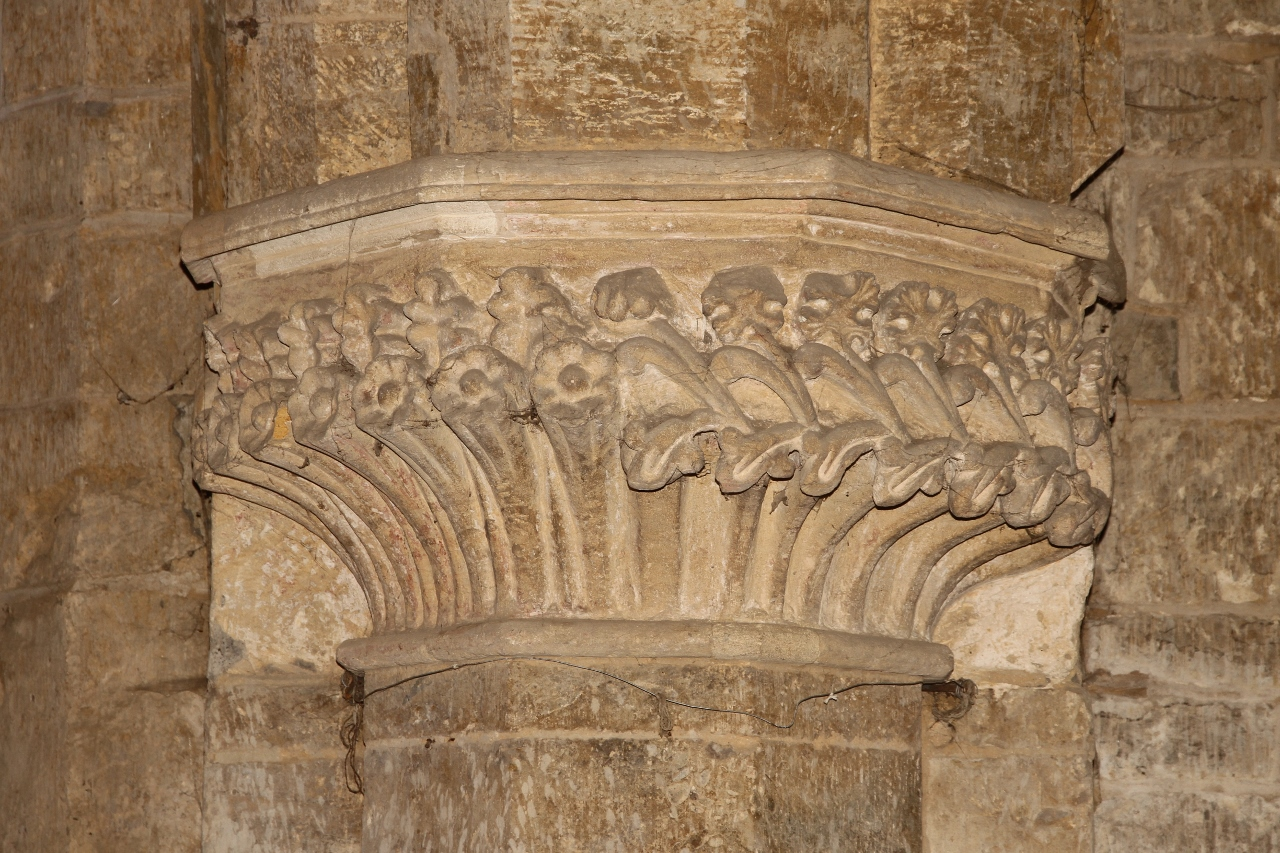
Early English capital at the west end of the south aisle of Holy Trinity parish church. Jennifer Sherwood describes the two contrasting halves of the design as "archaic trumpet scallop bursting into foliage".

=== Parish church ===
The Church of England parish church of the Holy Trinity was in existence by the first quarter of the 12th century.

In the 13th century the south aisle was added, linked with the nave by an Early English Gothic three-bay arcade. Early in the 14th century the south aisle was rebuilt and new windows inserted in the chancel, all in the Decorated Gothic style. The Perpendicular Gothic bell tower was built in 1504. The south porch is also a Perpendicular Gothic addition. Holy Trinity is a Grade II* listed building. The tower has a ring of five bells, all cast in 1678 by Henry Bagley of Chacombe and a clock that was installed before 1720. Holy Trinity is now one of eight ecclesiastical parishes in the Ironstone Benefice. The Reverend Robert Edward Hughes was the rector of Shenington. He and his wife, Martha Pyne, had a daughter, Marian Hughes, in Shenington on 14 January 1817 and she became the first woman to take religious vows in the Anglican church in modern times.

The Norman chancel arch survives, but in 1879 the church was restored under the direction of JL Pearson, a larger Gothic Revival chancel arch was inserted and the Norman one was moved to the north side of the chancel where it is now the portal to the organ loft.

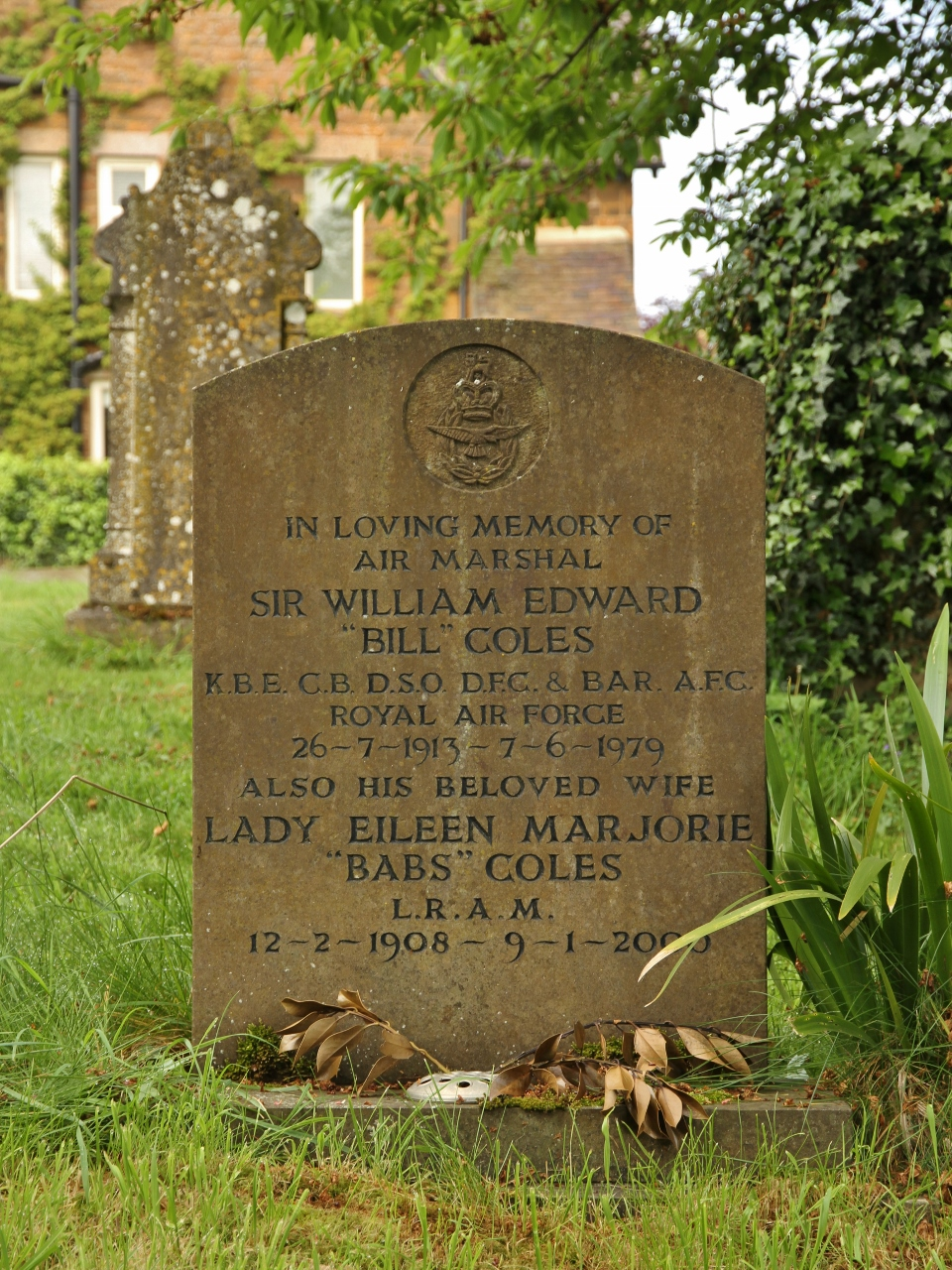
Headstone in Holy Trinity parish churchyard of Air Marshal Sir William and Lady Eileen Coles

=== Chapel ===
In 1819 a Nonconformist chapel was built of brick near the stream that forms the boundary with Alkerton. It was shared by Primitive Methodists and Independent Protestants. It attracted many of the poorer residents of the parish, but it declined in the early decades of the 20th century. It had ceased to be used for worship some years before it was sold in 1948.

== Social and economic history ==
On 13 May 1721 a fire swept through much of the village, destroying the thatched roofs of many of the Hornton stone cottages. The Parish Register was destroyed, as the curate was keeping it in the Parsonage House in breach of ecclesiastical law. On 3 December 1810 a bare-knuckle boxing match was staged at Shenington Hollow, exploiting the parish's inaccessibility from Gloucestershire's Justices of the Peace. The pugilists were British champion Tom Cribb and Virginian former slave Tom Molineaux. Cribb's victory made him World champion. In 1868 the National Gazetteer of Great Britain and Ireland described Shenington:

... a parish in the upper division of Tewkesbury hundred, county Oxford, formerly in, Gloucestershire, 6 miles N.W. of Banbury, its post town, and 29 N.W. of Oxford. The village, which is situated on the borders of Warwickshire and Gloucestershire, is wholly agricultural. The surface is hilly, and the land chiefly arable. The soil produces good crops of wheat, barley, and turnips. The living is a rectory in the diocese of Worcester, value £321. The church, dedicated to the Holy Trinity, was partially rebuilt in the last century. The parochial charities produce about £6 per annum. The Dissenters have a place of worship. There is a free school.

A National School was operating in Shenington by 1868 and a school building for it was completed in 1871. The building was enlarged in 1905 to absorb the children of neighbouring Alkerton, whose own National School was closed that year. By 1962 Shenington school was a Church of England school. At some date it must have been reorganised as a junior school, as it is now a primary school. On 7 June 1841 Shenington Amicable Society was formed. In 1912 it became a lodge of the Independent Order of Oddfellows Manchester Unity. In 1972 the lodge was absorbed into that of Hook Norton. An annual service for the lodge was held in Holy Trinity church on Trinity Sunday each year until 1987.

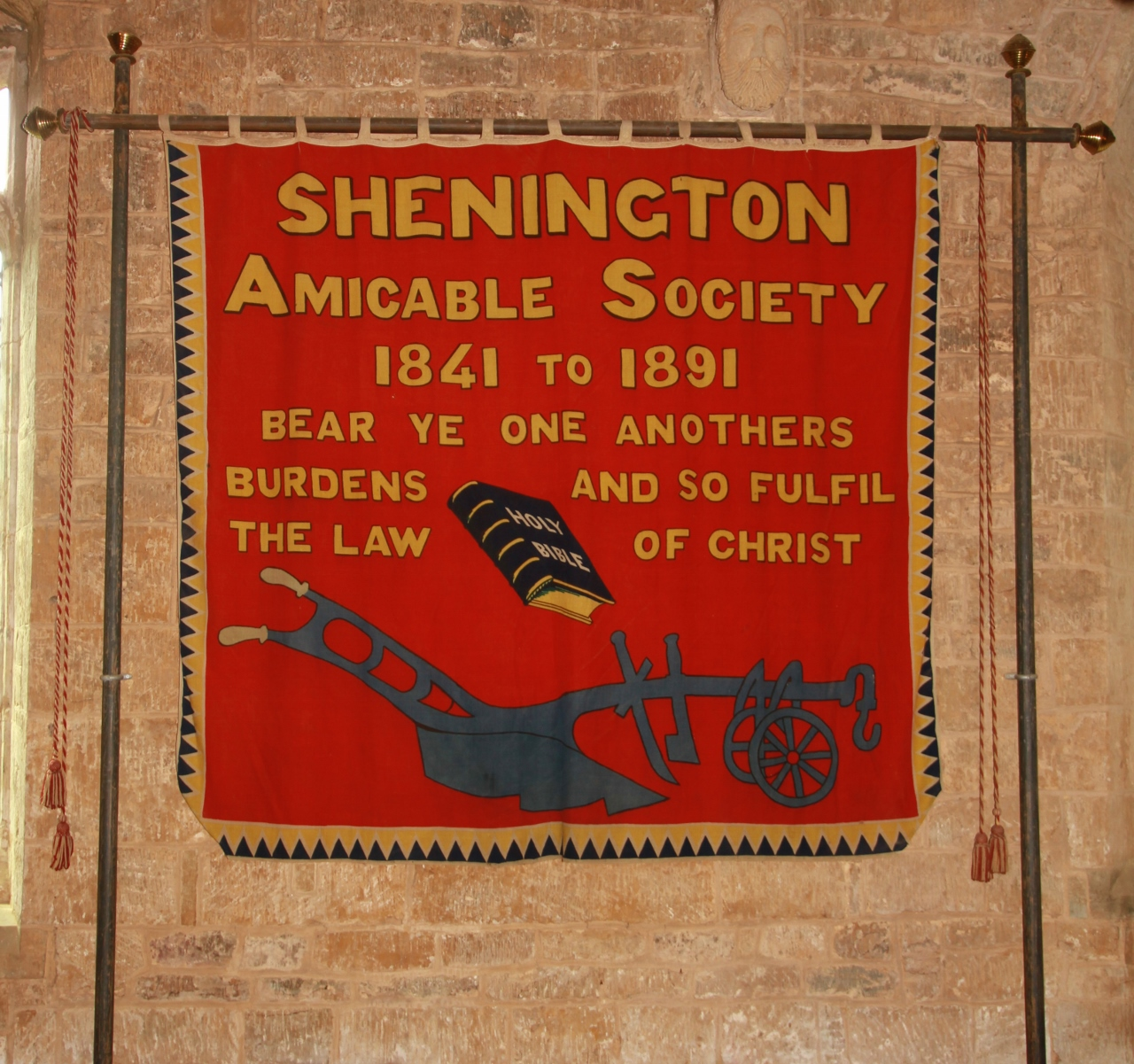
Shenington Amicable Society banner in Holy Trinity parish church

== RAF Edgehill ==
In the Second World War RAF Edgehill was used for flight tests of experimental jet aircraft alongside aircrew training. After the war it was decommissioned from RAF use and became Shenington Airfield. Part of the former RAF air station is used by the Shenington Gliding Club and Shenington Kart Track, the home of Shenington Kart Racing Club. Shenington KRC was founded in 1959 and is the oldest Kart racing club in the UK. Shenington Kart circuit also hosts Pedal Car Racing and has staged a 24-hour pedal car race since 2008.

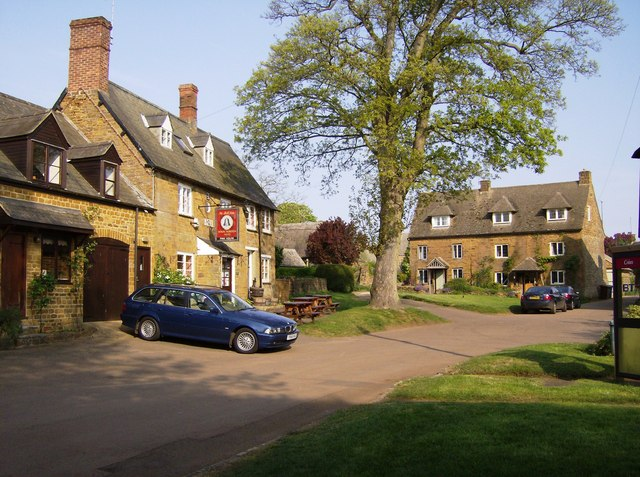
Part of the village green, with the Bell Inn on the left

== Amenities ==
Shenington has one public house, The Bell. A date stone over its front door records that it was built in 1700.

== Sources ==
- Ekwall, Eilert (1960) [1936]. Concise Oxford Dictionary of English Place-Names (4th ed.). Oxford: Oxford University Press. Shenington. ISBN 0198691033.
- Hamilton, NES, ed. (1868). National Gazetteer of Great Britain and Ireland. London: Virtue & Co.
- Hannah, Richard; Anson, Cyril (2000) [1973]. Shenington and Alkerton, Parishes and Churches 2000 (3rd ed.).
- Lobel, Mary D; Crossley, Alan, eds. (1969). A History of the County of Oxford. Victoria County History. Vol. 9: Bloxham Hundred. London: Oxford University Press for the Institute of Historical Research. pp. 44–53, 171–188. ISBN 978-0-19722-726-8.
- Sherwood, Jennifer; Pevsner, Nikolaus (1974). Oxfordshire. The Buildings of England. Harmondsworth: Penguin Books. pp. 753–754. ISBN 0-14-071045-0.
