= Charles Seager (orientalist) =

Charles Seager (1808–1878) was an English orientalist. A Catholic convert of 1842, he spent over 30 years as an independent scholar and author.

== Early life ==
Born in 1808, he was the second son of John Seager (1776–1849) of Evesbatch, Worcestershire, rector of Welsh Bicknor, Herefordshire, from 1808 until his death. John Seager published editions of works on Ancient Greek by Lambert Bos, Hendrik Hoogeveen, Gottfried Hermann, Michael Maittaire and François Viger.

Charles Seager matriculated as a member of Magdalen Hall, Oxford, on 30 November 1832; and obtained the Pusey and Ellerton scholarship in 1834. In that year he was elected a scholar of Worcester College, He graduated B.A. on 25 May 1836, and M.A. on 24 April 1839.

Seager was ordained deacon in the Church of England, in June 1836 by Richard Bagot, Bishop of Oxford; That year he gained a Kennicott Hebrew scholarship, given by public examination and open to Oxford B.A.s. The maximum tenure was four years. and was ordained priest in 1837. For some time he had been a pupil of Edward Pusey, under whom he gave public lectures in Hebrew, acting as Pusey's assistant for four years.

== Catholic convert ==
Edmund Jackson, writing in 1899 in the Dublin Review, called Seager "one of the type, growing extinct, of quaint, old-world scholars, full of out-of-the-way learning".

Seager was in Oxford during the rise of the Tractarians. He became associated with the movement, and assisted in the publication of the literature connected with it. He excited comment by wearing a distinctive black stole while assisting at services at St Thomas the Martyr's Church. He was attacked for the ritualism of its added crosses, and supposed crosses on the surplice, by George Townsend.

From 1838 Seager lived in a shared house on St Aldate's, Oxford for "young writers" set up by Pusey and John Henry Newman, with Mark Pattison and James Bowling Mozley. By summer 1841, the Seagers had a daughter, and were living at 28 St John Street, Oxford. It was there, with the Seagers, that Marian Hughes in 1841 took the three vows as an Anglican nun, before Pusey; her cousin Thomas Chamberlain was a friend of Seager's. The Seagers then travelled in France with Hughes, visiting convents in Normandy. As did John Rouse Bloxam, a Tractarian colleague who shared his interest in liturgy, Seager visited the new Catholic chapel opened by Ambrose Phillipps De Lisle at Grace-Dieu.

With William George Ward and John Dobree Dalgairns following, Seager was in the earliest group of Tractarian converts to Catholicism. In January 1842 Pusey wrote to Newman asking him to correct Seager's romanising tendencies; Newman's efforts were in vain.

Seager was received into the Catholic Church on 12 October 1843 at St Mary's College, Oscott. The following day, Newman noted in his diary that Seager had written to him, asking Newman to break the news to his wife. Newman's supporter Charles Crawley (1788–1871) pronounced Seager "mad", "positively mad". His conversion grieved Pusey. Seager found Nicholas Wiseman's orientalist knowledge sympathetic, and it was Wiseman who received him as a Catholic.

Seager then began a long itinerant period as an independent scholar. In 1847 the Seagers' daughter Marian died in Paris, aged six. In 1850 Seager and his wife were living in Brussels. In the early 1870s he tutored E. A. Wallis Budge in Biblical Hebrew and Syriac. He provided Budge with an introduction to Samuel Birch of the British Museum; and began to teach him cuneiform.

== Academic orientalist ==
When the Catholic University College, Kensington was founded in 1875, Seager was appointed to the chair of Hebrew and comparative philology. His knowledge of oriental languages was extensive, but his special forte lay in the Semitic branch, Hebrew, Arabic, and Syriac being his chief study. During the latter part of his life, however, he devoted considerable attention to the languages of Assyria and Egypt, and he was a regular attendant at the classes instituted by the Society of Biblical Archæology for instruction in those tongues. He came to be on good terms with Archibald Sayce and Peter le Page Renouf, lecturers at the classes.

== Death ==
Charles Seager died suddenly at the Hôtel de La Ville in Florence, while attending the 4th International Congress of Orientalists on 18 September 1878. Shortly before his death he had been re-admitted a member of the University of Oxford.

== Works ==
Seager's works are:

- Græcorum casuum analysis. De vera casuum verborum, inflectionumque in genere, natura et origine … brevis disputatio, London, 1833. "...an enquiry that turns upon the affinity of Greek and Sanscrit".
- A Hebrew ode for the inauguration of His Grace the Duke of Wellington as Chancellor of the University of Oxford, 1834
- The Daily Service of the Anglo-Catholic Church, adapted to family or private worship. By a Priest, Banbury, 1838. Stanley Morison called this "a neat quasi-liturgical piece".
- Auricular Confession. Six letters in answer to the attacks of one of the city lecturers, on the Catholic principle of private confession to a priest … By Academicus, Oxford, 1842. Reply to the Rev. William Simcox Bricknell.
- Ecclesiæ Anglicanæ Officia Antiqua: Portiforii seu Breviarii Sarisburiensis, annotatione perpetua illustrati, et cum Breviariis Eboracensi, Herefordensi, et Romano comparati, Fasciculus Primus, London, 1843; 2nd part, London, 1855. The first portion of the fasciculus primus had been separately published, London, 1842. For the Use of Sarum, attributed to Saint Osmund, Seager published ultimately two fascicles making up the Commune of the Salisbury Breviary. The first part was published in Brussels in 1843, the second in Treves in 1856.
- The Spiritual Exercises of St. Ignatius of Loyola, translated from the authorised Latin, preface by Nicholas Wiseman, London, 1847. One of a number of English translations of the Spiritual Exercises.
- Faithfulness to Grace. On the Position of Anglicans holding the Real Presence; with considerations on the sin of unlawful obedience, London, 1850. "In Letter to a Friend."
- The Female Jesuit abroad; a true and romantic Narrative of True Life: including some account, with historical reminiscences, of Bonn and the Middle Rhine, London, 1853. On the imposter Marie Garside. Jemima Luke had written a novel, The Female Jesuit, a loosely-based satire about Garside, and a sequel. Seager, who had encountered Garside in Brussels, added a third novel mixing fiction and autobiography.
- The Cumulative Vote, as a moderative of State oscillations, London (3 editions), 1867. Letter to the Editor of The Times.
- Plutocracy as a Principle; or, does the possession of property involve, as a moral right, that of political power? A letter in which are impartially presented both sides of the question, 2nd edit. London, 1867.
- The Suffrage as a Moral Right: what are its grounds?, London, 1867.

Seager was also a contributor to the Classical Museum and to the Transactions of the Society of Biblical Archæology. He translated:

- The Smaller Hebrew and Chaldee Lexicon of Professor Simonis, translated and improved from his second edition, London, 1832. From the work of Johann Simonis.
- For the Library of Anglo-Catholic Theology, he edited an English edition (1844) of the Dissertation sur la validité des ordinations des Anglais of Pierre François le Courayer, on Anglican orders.
- De l'Existence et de l'Institut des Jésuites (1844) by Gustave Xavier Lacroix de Ravignan, in its year of publication.

== Family ==
Seager married in 1837, Anna Smith, daughter of the late Rev. Walter Smith (died 1821). She also became a Catholic. Their children included Ignatius Seager (1845–1870), a priest, and Osmund Seager of the Admiralty. Anna Seager died at Ramsgate on 27 March 1893.
