= Pedal car racing =

Circuit racing endurance sport

Pedal car racing is a circuit racing endurance sport in the United Kingdom, in which teams of up to six drivers race single-seater human powered sports cars in races of up to 24 hours in length. Four team members share the driving (increasing to six in 24-hour races), with each completing as many laps as they can before handing over to the next driver. Therefore, the races are very similar in style and tactics to endurance sports car races across the world.

== Origins ==
The races grew from the National Scout Car races, which started in 1939 and resumed after the war in 1950 with several large scale races. The University of Bristol students started the National 24-Hour Pedal Car Race in 1964, racing around College Green in Bristol. The race was moved to Whitchurch airfield and the 1967 race was captured on film by British Pathe.

== British Pedal Car Championship ==
First run in 1998, the British Pedal Car Championship is a series of endurance races taking place between late March/early April and September/October every year in the UK. Typically, there are 7 or 8 races totaling just over 60 racing hours, including the Shenington 24 hour race in June, where double points are awarded.

The championship has evolved into 7 or 8 rounds from its early days, and is now held at mostly Kart tracks around the country, usually starting at Wombwell and ending at Curborough, with the prestige 24-hour race held in June at Shenington.

The championship is organised and run by the British Federation of Pedal Car Racing.

The races in the current race calendar are: (as of 2024)

1. Evesham - 6hr Endurance
2. Hereford - 6hr Endurance
3. Shenington - 24hr Endurance
4. Blackbushe - Sprints
5. Blaskbushe - 100 mile / 5.5hr Endurance
6. Curborough - 6hr Endurance

== Classes ==
There are eight classes in pedal car racing.

Class Qualification Criteria
Class	Specific Criteria	Maximum number of drivers by race duration (D)			Notes
Class	Specific Criteria	12 < D ≤ 24 hrs	8 < D ≤ 12 hrs	D ≤ 8 hrs	Notes
PC1: Open	None	6	4	4	All cars automatically qualify for PC1 and it is the cars at the head of this class which usually fight it out for the overall win.
PC2: Under 18	All drivers must have their 18th birthday on or after 1 January of the race year	6	4	4	The PCA class was introduced in 2019 to ease the transition from PC2 to PC1. Following a successful trial it was renamed PC2 as lapcounters kept forgetting about it when listing the classes. PC2 was renamed PC3, PC3>PC4 and PC4>PC5 The cars are usually very similar in appearance to those racing in PC1,. Quite often the lead PC2 outfits will be in amongst the top six overall come the end of the race.
PC3: Under 16	All drivers must have their 16th birthday on or after 1 January of the race year	6	5	4	The cars are usually very similar in appearance to those racing in PC1 but they tend to be built a little bit more robustly to cope with the increased number of driver changes and the less sympathetic treatment that teenage drivers can sometimes dish out to racing machinery.
PC4: Under 14	All drivers must have their 14th birthday on or after 1 January of the race year	6	6	6	The cars are often lighter and generally have to be somewhat smaller for obvious reasons! Most of the cars in this class do not run aerodynamic bodywork – the drivers change over far more often and do not reach the higher speeds of PC1 and PC2 so a body shell would generally be seen as a hindrance.
PC5: Under 12	All drivers must have their 12th birthday on or after 1 January of the race year	6	6	6	These cars are generally very basic, unfaired and as light as possible.
PC0: Solo	There must be 1 driver only who also qualifies for another class	1	1	1	
PCD: Duo	Duo Maximum 2 drivers who also qualify for another class	2	2	2	
PCF: Female	All drivers must be female and qualify for another class	Defined by age class of team			

== See also ==
- Velomobile
