= François Viger (Jesuit) =

French Jesuit scholar

François Viger, in Latin Franciscus Vigerus (1590–1647), was a French Jesuit scholar. He was born at Rouen. He composed a valuable Latin translation of the Praeparatio evangelica of Eusebius of Caesarea with notes, published at Paris in 1628. He also wrote a treatise on Greek, De praecipuis linguae graecae idiotismis, in 1632.
