= Henton, Oxfordshire =

Hamlet in Oxfordshire, England

Coordinates: 51.720°N 0.900°W

Henton
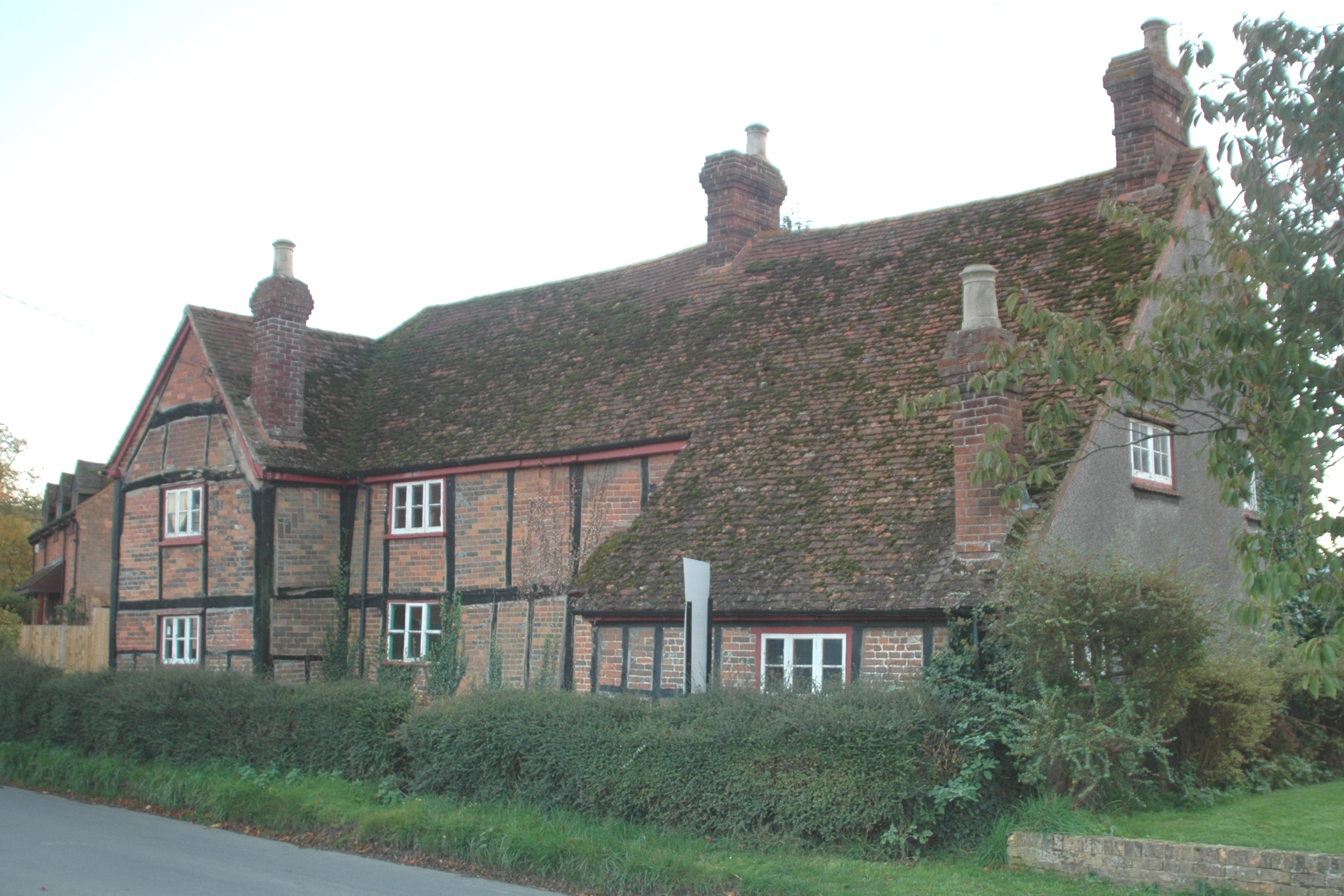
- Timber-framed cottages in Henton

- Location within Oxfordshire
- OS grid reference: SP7602
- Civil parish: Chinnor
- District: South Oxfordshire
- Shire county: Oxfordshire
- Region: South East
- Country: England
- Sovereign state: United Kingdom
- Post town: Chinnor
- Postcode district: OX39
- Dialling code: 01844
- Police: Thames Valley
- Fire: Oxfordshire
- Ambulance: South Central
- UK Parliament: Henley

Henton is a hamlet in Oxfordshire, about 3 miles (5 km) west of Princes Risborough in Buckinghamshire. Henton is in the civil parish of Chinnor, just off the Icknield Way, which has been a road since the Iron Age.

== Railway ==
In 1869–72 the Watlington and Princes Risborough Railway was built past Henton. It ran within about 0.5 miles (800 m) of Henton but the nearest station it provided was about 1.5 miles (2.4 km) away at Chinnor. The Great Western Railway took over the line in 1883 and built Wainhill Crossing Halt about 0.75 miles (1.2 km) from Henton in 1906. British Railways withdrew passenger services and closed the halt in 1957. The line remained open for freight as far as Chinnor cement works until 1989. In 1994 the Chinnor and Princes Risborough Railway Association reopened this section of line as a heritage railway. The association has not reinstated Wainhill Crossing Halt.

== Amenities ==
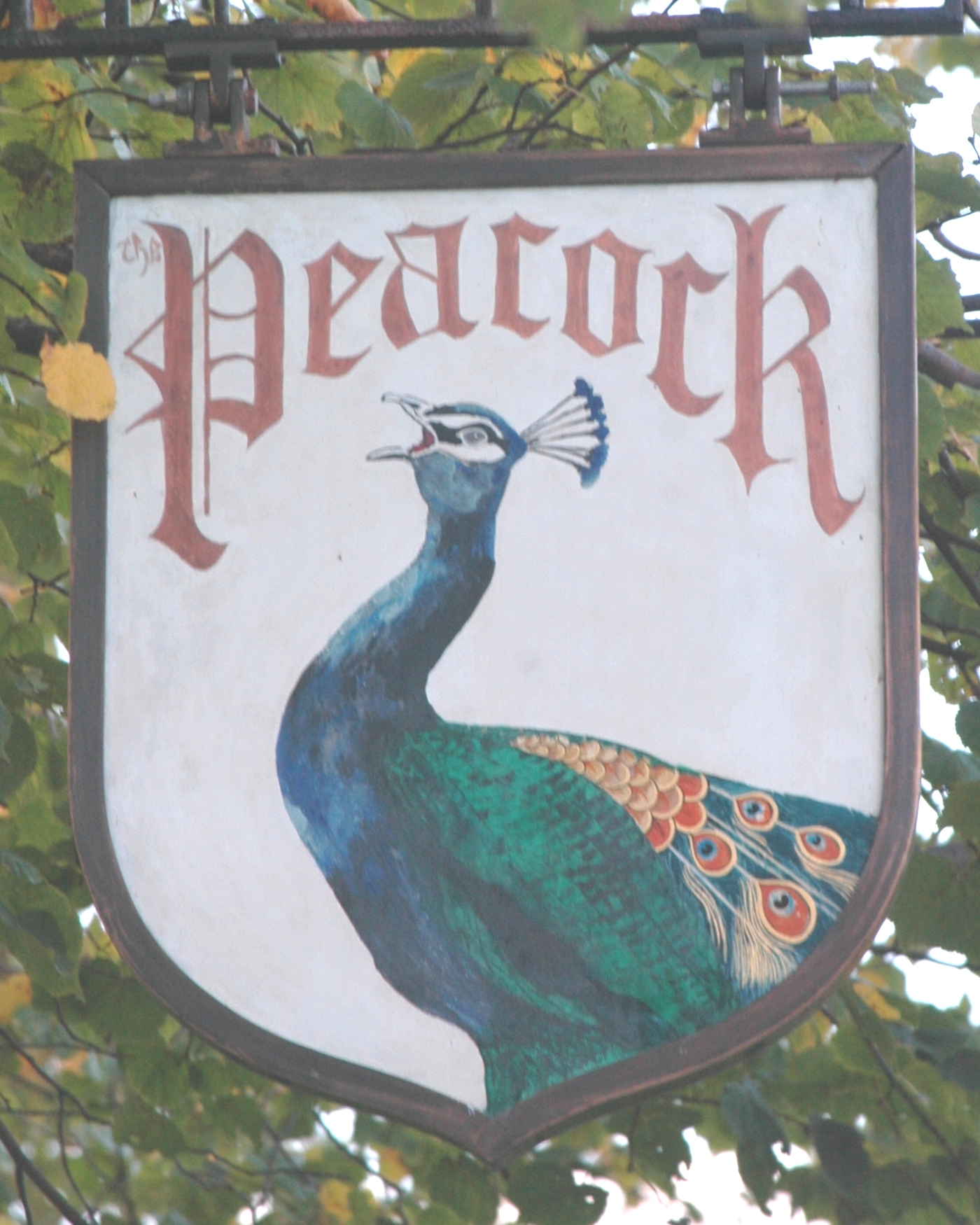
Pub sign for The Peacock

Henton has a hotel and restaurant, the Peacock. It also has a bed and breakfast, Manor Farm Cottage.

== Gallery ==
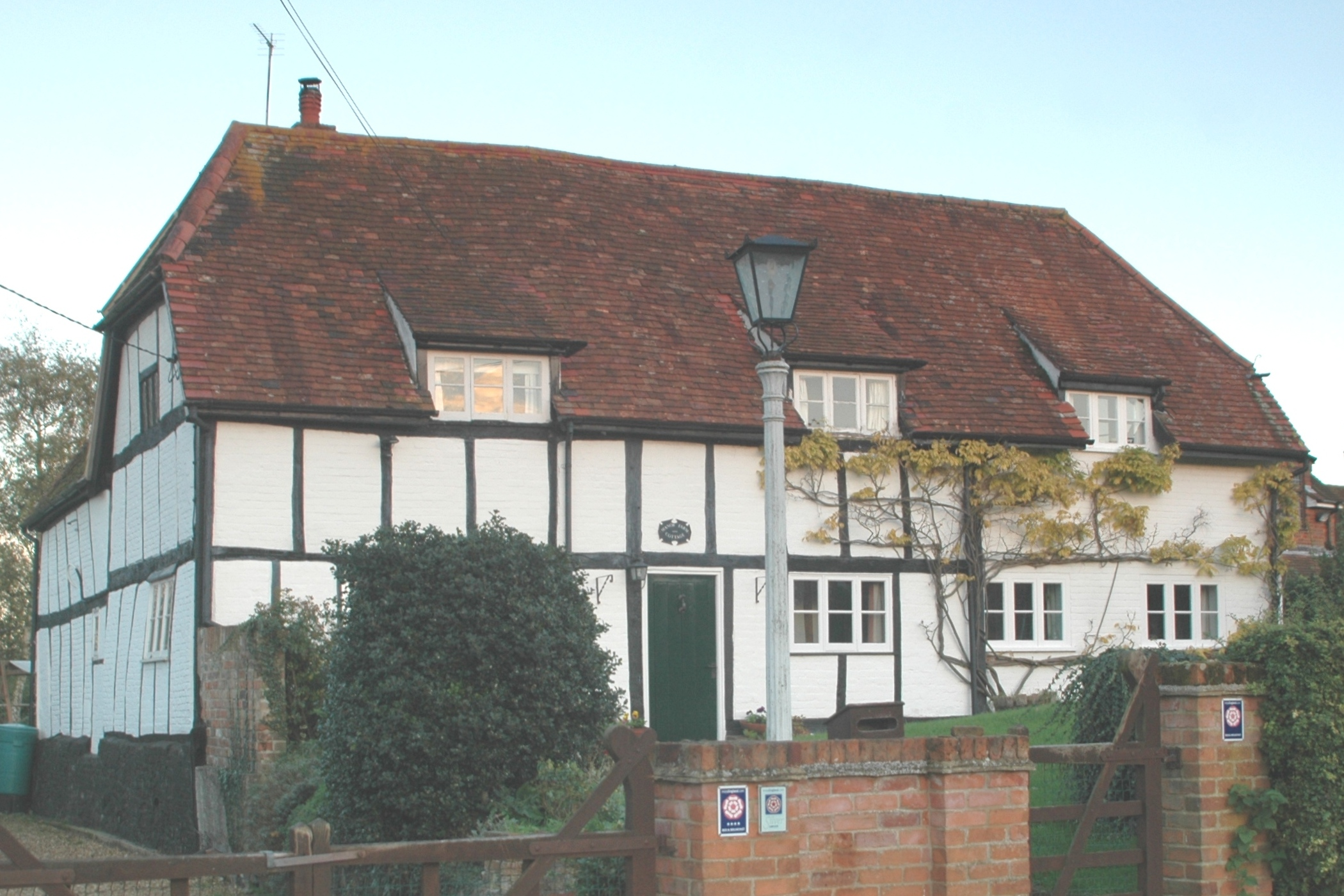
Manor Farm Cottage, Henton

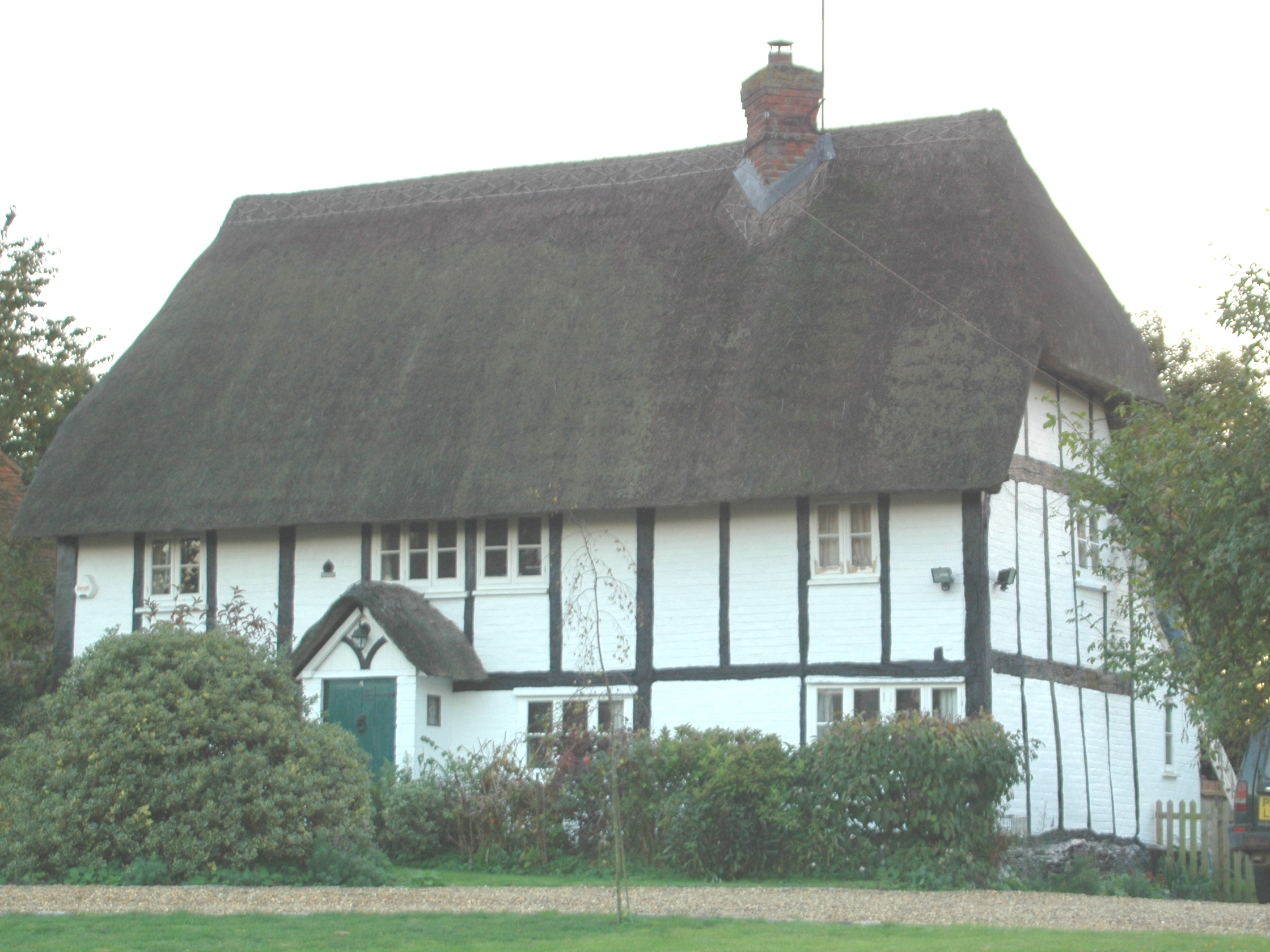
Timber-framed thatched cottage in Henton

== Sources ==
- Oppitz, Leslie (2000). Lost Railways of the Chilterns. Newbury: Countryside Books. ISBN 1-85306-643-5.
