= Bledlow Bridge Halt railway station =

Disused railway station in Bledlow, Buckinghamshire

Coordinates: 51.718791°N 0.871362°W

Bledlow Bridge Halt
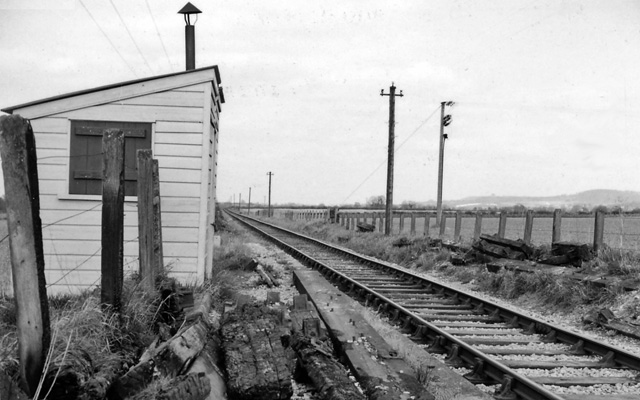
- Bledlow Bridge Halt in 1961

General information
- Location: Bledlow, Buckinghamshire; England
- Grid reference: SP781028
- Platforms: 1

Other information
- Status: Disused

History
- Original company: Great Western Railway
- Pre-grouping: Great Western Railway
- Post-grouping: Great Western Railway; Western Region of British Railways

Key dates
- 1 September 1906: Station opened
- 1 July 1957: Closed
Location

Bledlow Bridge Halt railway station was a halt on the Watlington and Princes Risborough Railway which the Great Western Railway opened in 1906 to serve the Buckinghamshire village of Bledlow. The opening of the halt was part of a GWR attempt to encourage more passengers on the line at a time when competition from bus services was drawing away patronage.

== History ==
The halt was one of three that the GWR opened on the line in September 1906 to try to encourage passenger traffic in the face of increased competition from buses. It was situated to the north of Bledlow, on the northern side of Perry Lane adjacent to the railway overbridge which carried the Watlington and Princes Risborough Railway over the road. A flight of steps led up from the road to the station which had very basic facilities: a single low platform, no more than one coach-length long, a running in board and a small wooden passenger waiting shelter. The 7 square yards (5.9 m^{2}) needed for the waiting shelter were acquired by the railway company from Lord Carrington in 1909.

Responsibility for the halt was given to the stationmaster of the nearby Bledlow station on the Wycombe Railway. Staff from this station were sent to refill the three paraffin lamps on the halt, as well as the down distant signal for Wainhill Crossing Halt. In winter a member of staff lit the lamps in the afternoon and the guard on the last train extinguished them. By the 1940s only a handful of people were reported to be using the halt which was convenient for a nearby children's home. In the long term the GWR's halt strategy did little to dissuade people from more convenient bus services. In 1957 British Railways closed the halt and withdrew passenger services from the line.

Preceding station	Historical railways	Following station
Princes Risborough; Line and station open	Great Western Railway; Watlington and Princes Risborough Railway	Wainhill Crossing Halt; Line open, station closed

== Present day ==
Bledlow Bridge Halt has been rebuilt by the Chinnor and Princes Risborough Railway which has reopened the line through the station. The halt is not however open to passengers use. The halt building was demolished when the line closed but the steps that lead up to the halt, although damaged and overgrown, are visible. Until 1957 when the line operated steps from the carriage were used to allow passengers to gain access so, although the platform remains, it is not used by the CPRR because of its height.

== Sources ==
- Butt, R. V. J. (October 1995). The Directory of Railway Stations: details every public and private passenger station, halt, platform and stopping place, past and present (1st ed.). Sparkford: Patrick Stephens Ltd. ISBN 978-1-85260-508-7. OCLC 60251199. OL 11956311M.
- Clinker, C.R. (October 1978). Clinker's Register of Closed Passenger Stations and Goods Depots in England, Scotland and Wales 1830-1977. Bristol: Avon-Anglia Publications & Services. ISBN 0-905466-19-5.
- Jowett, Alan (2000). Jowett's Nationalised Railway Atlas (1st ed.). Penryn, Cornwall: Atlantic Transport Publishers. ISBN 978-0-906899-99-1. OCLC 228266687.
- Jowett, Alan (March 1989). Jowett's Railway Atlas of Great Britain and Ireland: From Pre-Grouping to the Present Day (1st ed.). Sparkford: Patrick Stephens Ltd. ISBN 978-1-85260-086-0. OCLC 22311137.
- Karau, Paul; Turner, Chris (1998). Country branch line: An intimate portrait of the Watlington branch. Vol 2: The stations. Didcot: Wild Swan. ISBN 1-874103-46-1.
- Oppitz, Leslie (2000). Lost Railways of the Chilterns. Newbury: Countryside Books. ISBN 1-85306-643-5.
- Shannon, Paul (1995). British Railways Past and Present: Buckinghamshire, Bedfordshire and West Hertfordshire. Wadenhoe, Peterborough: Past & Present Publishing Ltd. ISBN 1-85895-073-2.
