= Bledlow =

Village in Buckinghamshire, England

Coordinates: 51.7123°N 0.8754°W

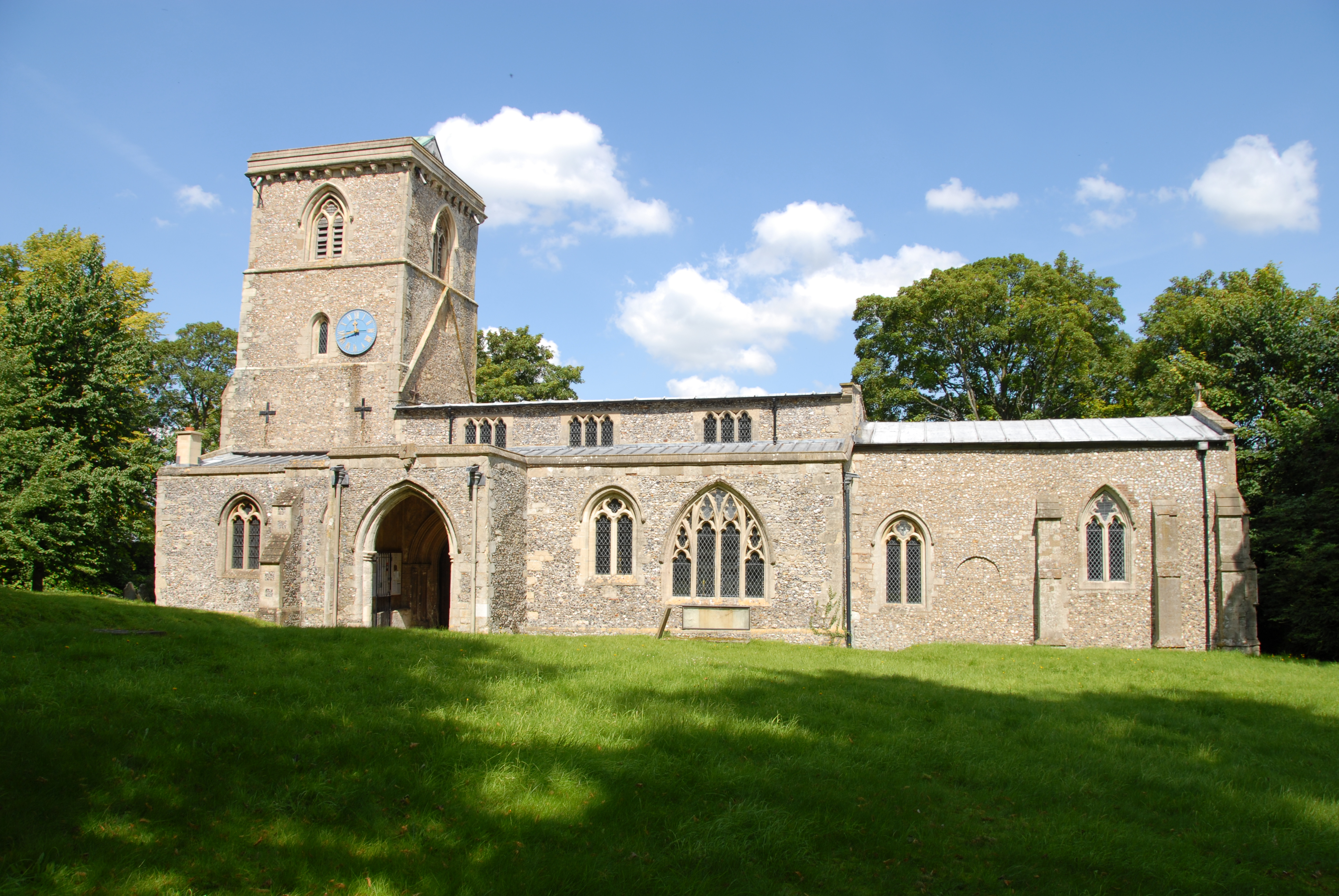
- Holy Trinity parish church

- Location within Buckinghamshire
- OS grid reference: SP778021
- Civil parish: Bledlow-cum-Saunderton
- Unitary authority: Buckinghamshire
- Ceremonial county: Buckinghamshire
- Region: South East
- Country: England
- Sovereign state: United Kingdom
- Post town: Princes Risborough
- Postcode district: HP27
- Dialling code: 01844
- Police: Thames Valley
- Fire: Buckinghamshire
- Ambulance: South Central
- UK Parliament: Mid Buckinghamshire constituency
- Website: Bledlow-cum-Saunderton Parish Council

Bledlow is a village in the civil parish of Bledlow-cum-Saunderton, in Buckinghamshire, England. It is about 2 miles (3.2 km) west-southwest of Princes Risborough, and is on the county boundary with Oxfordshire.

The toponym "Bledlow" is derived from Old English and means "Bledda's burial mound". A 10th century document records it as Bleddanhloew; the Domesday Book of 1086 records it as Bledelai. A more common derivation is from "Bled-Hlaw" meaning Bloody Hill which commemorates an undated battle between Saxons and Danes.

Bledlow was an ancient parish. In 1934 the parish was merged with the neighbouring parish of Saunderton to form a new civil parish called Bledlow-cum-Saunderton. At the 1931 census (the last before the abolition of the parish) Bledlow had a population of 925.

== Geography ==
The village is on the ancient Icknield Way and is where several springs form a small pool called the Lyde. The water from the springs is said to wear away the chalk on which the village stands, giving rise to the simple local medieval nursery rhyme:

They who live and do abide
Shall see Bledlow Church fall into the Lyde

The brook running from the pool into the nearby valley (called the Lyde Brook) provided water power for two watermills for many years. Bledlow's watermill is a tourist attraction.

Above the village, carved into the chalk of Wain Hill is a large cross, similar to that found at Whiteleaf. There is also a round barrow on the hill. It is thought that this is the barrow or burial mound referred to in the village name.

Within the parish of Bledlow-cum-Saunderton are several hamlets. The main one is Bledlow Ridge. The others are Forty Green (not to be confused with Forty Green near Beaconsfield), Pitch Green, Rout's Green, Skittle Green and Holly Green.

== Parish church ==
The Church of England parish church of the Holy Trinity overlooks the Vale of Aylesbury. It has two aisles and the nave arcades include capitals made in about 1200. Other features of interest are the font, some fragments of wall paintings, and the 13th- or 14th-century south doorway and porch. It is a Grade I listed building.

== Notable people ==
Actress Samantha Eggar lived in Bledlow as a child, and was a neighbour of Oliver Reed while there.

== Transport ==
Bledlow railway station was an intermediate station on the Wycombe Railway that served the village from 1862 to 1963. It was the first of two stations to serve the village, the second being Bledlow Bridge Halt on the Watlington and Princes Risborough Railway. It was 3/4 mile (1.2 km) to the south and closer to the village. It was opened in 1906 and closed in 1957. The potential for reopening the Wycombe Railway through Bledlow, which is now part of a long-distance footpath, was evaluated and dismissed by Chiltern Railways, the franchise holder for the Chiltern Main Line that runs through Princes Risborough.

== Sources and further reading ==
- Betjeman, John, ed. (1968). Collins Pocket Guide to English Parish Churches. Vol. The South. London: Collins. p. 125.
- Page, W.H., ed. (1908). A History of the County of Buckingham. Victoria County History. Vol. 2. London: Archibald Constable & Co. pp. 247–253.
- Pevsner, Nikolaus (1960). Buckinghamshire. The Buildings of England. Harmondsworth: Penguin Books. pp. 66–67. ISBN 0-14-071019-1.
- RCHME, ed. (1912). An Inventory of the Historical Monuments in Buckinghamshire. Vol. 1, South. London: Her Majesty's Stationery Office. pp. 51–57.
