= South Aylesbury Halt railway station =

Aylesbury-Princes Risborough rail station

Coordinates: 51°48′30.8″N 0°48′36.4″W

South Aylesbury Halt
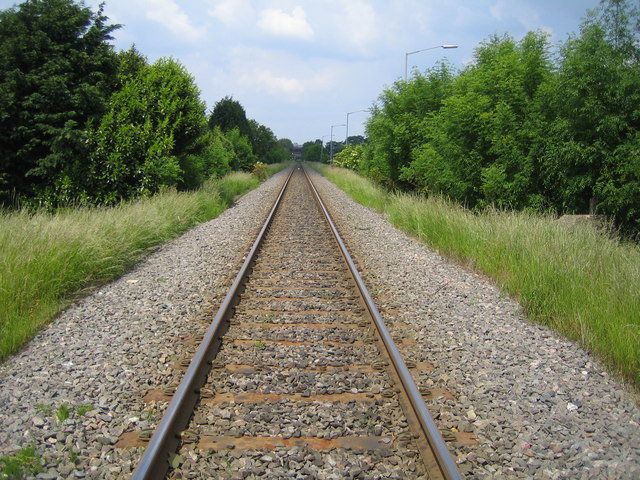
- Station site in 2006.

General information
- Location: Aylesbury, District of Aylesbury Vale; England
- Grid reference: SP8213312477
- Platforms: 1

Other information
- Status: Disused

History
- Original company: Great Western and Great Central Joint Railway
- Post-grouping: Great Western and Great Central Joint Railway; Western Region of British Railways

Key dates
- 1933: Opened
- 1967: Closed
Location

South Aylesbury Halt was a railway station which was opened in 1933 and was closed in 1967. It was located on the Aylesbury–Princes Risborough line.

== History ==
The station was opened by the Great Western Railway on 13 February 1933 to serve factories in the locality, as well as the Southcourt housing estate. It was situated on a foot crossing between Mandeville Road and Old Stoke Road. In 1966, British Rail proposed the closure of the station which was queried by the East Midlands Transport Users Consultative Committee (TUCC) as usage figures showed that receipts were £130 per year while direct costs were only £26. British Rail subsequently justified the closure on the basis of anticipated renewal costs of £2,500 and the TUCC approved the closure, as there would be no hardship caused. The station closed on 5 June 1967.

Preceding station	Historical railways	Following station
Aylesbury; Line and station open	Western Region of British Railways; Aylesbury–Princes Risborough line	Little Kimble; Line and station open

== Present day ==
The station was demolished after closure and no trace remains. Pedestrian access across the railway was maintained at the station site until a fatality in November 2016 when a cyclist was killed. The crossing has since been closed.
