= Monks Risborough railway station =

Railway station in Buckinghamshire, England

Coordinates: 51.736°N 0.829°W

Monks Risborough
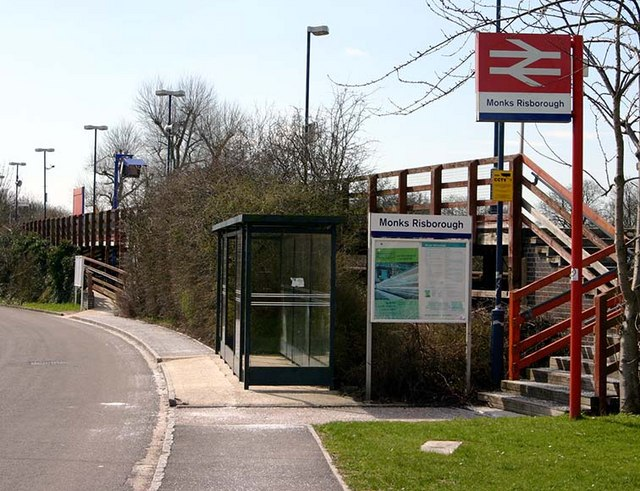

General information
- Location: Monks Risborough, Buckinghamshire; England
- Grid reference: SP809047
- Manager: Chiltern Railways
- Platforms: 1

Other information
- Station code: MRS
- Classification: DfT category F2

History
- Opened: 1929
- Original company: Great Western and Great Central Joint Railway
- Post-grouping: Great Western and Great Central Joint Railway

Passengers
- 2021/22: ▲14,894
- 2022/23: ▲14,986
- 2023/24: ▼13,724
- 2024/25: ▲20,538
- 2025/26: ▲24,844
Location
Notes
- Passenger statistics from the Office of Rail and Road

Monks Risborough railway station is a small, single platform railway station of the village of Monks Risborough in Buckinghamshire, England, adjoining the town of Princes Risborough.

The station is between Princes Risborough and Little Kimble stations on the branch line between Princes Risborough and Aylesbury.

Passenger services from this station are operated by Chiltern Railways.

== History ==
The Great Western Railway opened the station on 11 November 1929 as Monks Risborough and Whiteleaf Halt.

The station was transferred from the Western Region of British Rail to the London Midland Region on 24 March 1974.

== Services ==
On weekdays an hourly shuttle service operates for most of the day between Princes Risborough and Aylesbury using either a two-car or three-car Class 165 or Class 168, necessitating a change at Princes Risborough for onward travel towards London. Two early morning trains and one mid-afternoon train operate as through services to Marylebone. At weekends nearly all trains operate as through services to and from Marylebone.

The station platform is above street level, and is accessible by both ramp and steps. The ticket machine, at street level adjacent to the ramp entry, accepts cards, not cash.

Preceding station	National Rail	Following station
Princes Risborough	Chiltern Railways; Princes Risborough – Aylesbury	Little Kimble
