= Bledlow railway station =

Former railway station in Buckinghamshire, England

Coordinates: 51.728134°N 0.877964°W

Bledlow
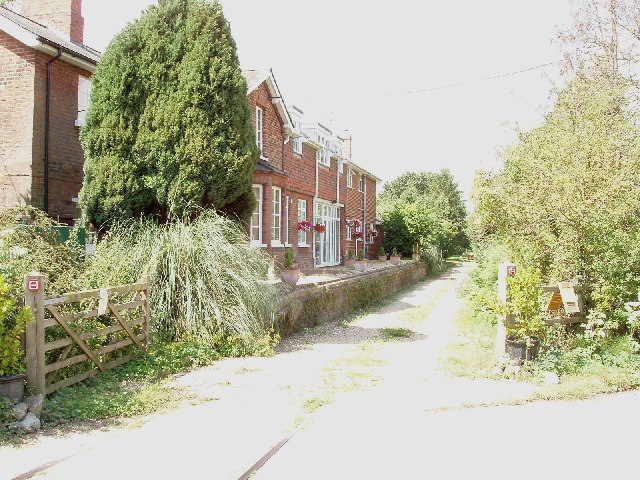
- Station building in 2005

General information
- Location: Bledlow, Buckinghamshire; England
- Grid reference: SP775038
- Platforms: 1

Other information
- Status: Disused

History
- Original company: Wycombe Railway
- Pre-grouping: Great Western Railway
- Post-grouping: Great Western Railway; Western Region of British Railways

Key dates
- 1 August 1862: Opened
- 7 January 1963: Closed
- October 1991: Line closed
Location

Bledlow railway station was an intermediate station on the Wycombe Railway which served the Buckinghamshire village of Bledlow from 1862 to 1963. It was one of two stations to serve the village, the other being Bledlow Bridge Halt on the Watlington and Princes Risborough Railway, which was 0.75 miles (1.21 km) to the south and closer to the village. The possibility of reopening the line through Bledlow, which is now part of a long-distance footpath, has been explored by Chiltern Railways, the franchise holder for the Chiltern Main Line which runs through Princes Risborough.

== History ==
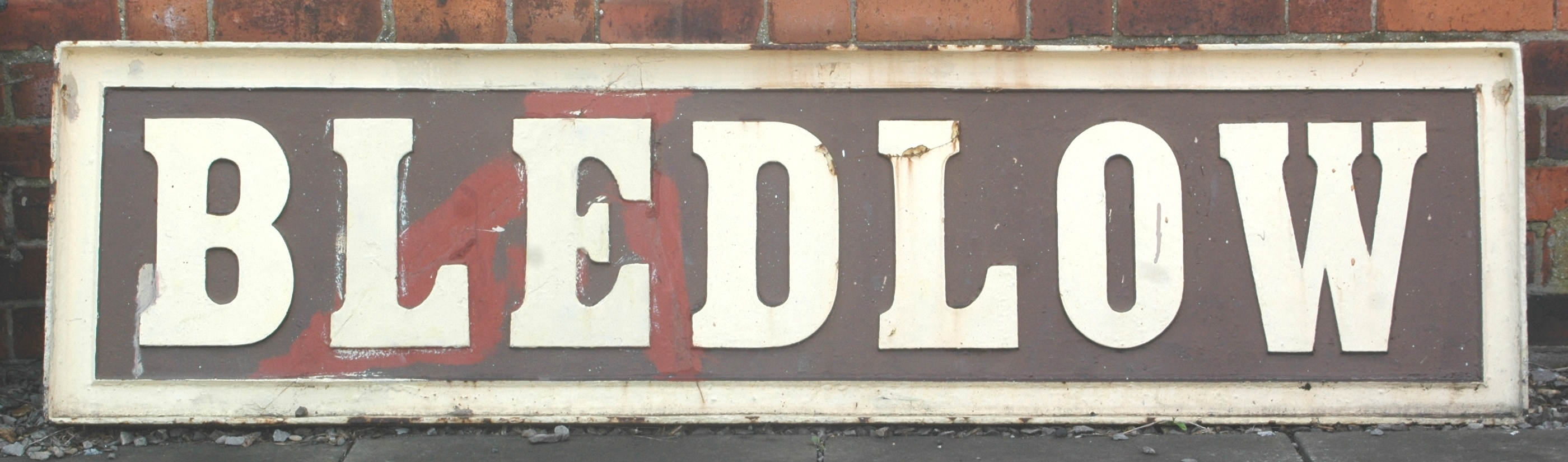
Great Western Railway cast iron station sign preserved at Didcot Railway Centre

Parliamentary authority to extend the Wycombe Railway's single track line beyond Princes Risborough to Oxford was given on 28 June 1861. Thame was reached by 31 July 1862 and a regular service from Paddington via Maidenhead began the next day. Four daily trains each way (one on Sundays) called at Thame, Bledlow, Princes Risborough, West Wycombe, High Wycombe and Maidenhead. Bledlow station was west of a level crossing on Sandpit Lane, 1 mile (1.6 km) from the village from which it took its name. A two-storey brick station building was built at Bledlow at a cost of £1,003-13s-6d. It included a booking office and accommodation for the station master.

A 15 feet (4.6 m) by 12 feet (3.7 m) signal box with a 16-lever frame controlled traffic over the level crossing was next to the main station building. Electric train staff instruments were installed on the line to Thame in the 1890s. Consequently, Bledlow box ceased to signal trains in 1902, but it remained in use to operate the crossing gates.

A single siding equipped with a 2-ton yard crane handled goods traffic which consisted of watercress and English elm boles for trawling nets made locally in Longwick. Figures from 1933 show that 2,853 long tons (2,899 t) of goods were sent from the station, whilst 402 long tons (408 t) tons of goods were received. In the same period 5,338 passenger tickets were issued and 6,529 parcels forwarded.

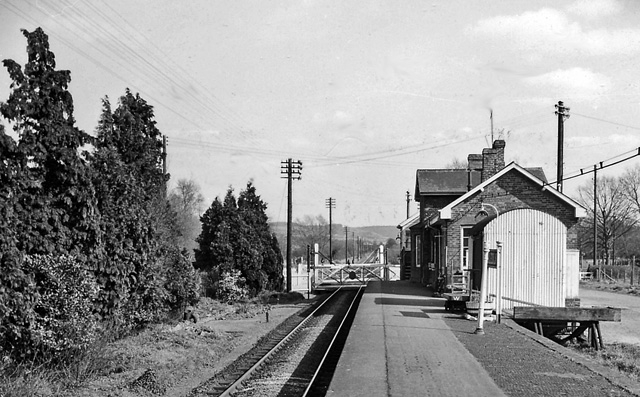
Bledlow Station in 1961

By 1957 freight had declined to only 139 long tons (141 t) were forwarded and 57 long tons (58 t) received. By November 1961 the line itself was carrying an average of 524 passengers per week. On the basis of an estimated saving of £34,372, British Railways withdrew passenger services between Oxford and Princes Risborough from January 1963 but the line remained open for freight traffic.

In September 1965 Bledlow level crossing was converted to automatic half-barriers enabling the signal box to be closed. Freight traffic was withdrawn and British Rail closed the line between Thame and Princes Risborough in October 1991.

== Routes ==
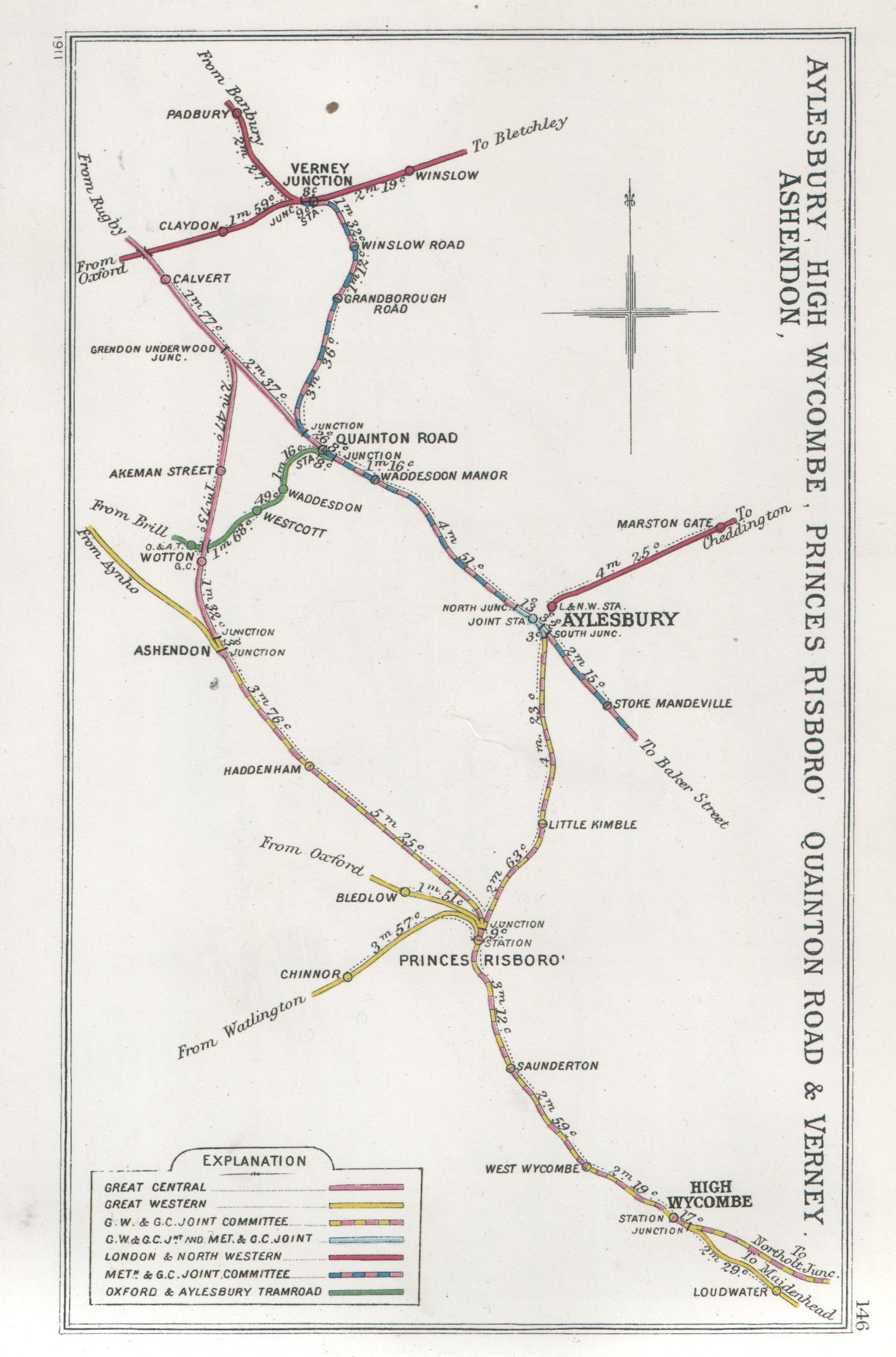
A 1911 Railway Clearing House map of railways in the vicinity of Bledlow

Preceding station	Disused railways	Following station
Towersey Halt; Line closed, station closed	Western Region of British Railways; Wycombe Railway	Princes Risborough; Line closed, station open

== Present day ==
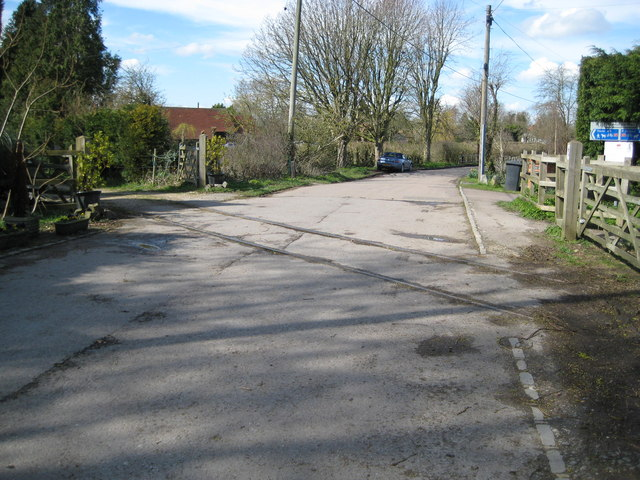
Level crossing over Sandpit Lane with extant rails

The station building survives and has been extended as a bed and breakfast run by the granddaughter of Percy Smith, Bledlow's third station master who worked at the station between 1918 and 1950. The signal box has been demolished and the trackbed is now part of the Phoenix Trail, a long-distance footpath and cycleway.

As part of its preparations for its bid to run the Chiltern Railways franchise, Chiltern Railways announced in 2000 that it was considering the possibility of reinstating passenger services on the line between Oxford and Risborough, the cost of which it estimated at £250 million. Chiltern Railways decided instead to build a 0.75 miles (1.21 km) link between the Oxford to Bicester Line and the Chiltern Main Line to run direct services between Oxford and London via High Wycombe.

== Sources ==
- Butt, R. V. J. (October 1995). The Directory of Railway Stations: details every public and private passenger station, halt, platform and stopping place, past and present (1st ed.). Sparkford: Patrick Stephens Ltd. ISBN 978-1-85260-508-7. OCLC 60251199. OL 11956311M.
- Clinker, C.R. (October 1978). Clinker's Register of Closed Passenger Stations and Goods Depots in England, Scotland and Wales 1830-1977. Bristol: Avon-Anglia Publications & Services. ISBN 0-905466-19-5.
- Mitchell, Vic; Smith, Keith (April 2003). Branch Lines to Princes Risborough from Aylesbury, Oxford and Watlington. Midhurst, West Sussex: Middleton Press. ISBN 1-904474-05-5.
- Oppitz, Leslie (2000). Lost Railways of the Chilterns. Newbury: Countryside Books. ISBN 1-85306-643-5.
- Potts, C.R. (2004). Oxford to Princes Risborough: A GWR Secondary Route. Usk, Mon.: The Oakwood Press. ISBN 0-85361-629-9.
- Simpson, Bill (2001). A History of the Railways in Oxfordshire; Part 2: The South. Witney, Oxon: Lamplight Publications. ISBN 978-1-899246-06-9.
