= Southcourt =

Housing estate in Aylesbury, Buckinghamshire, England

Coordinates: 51.803658°N 0.816974°W

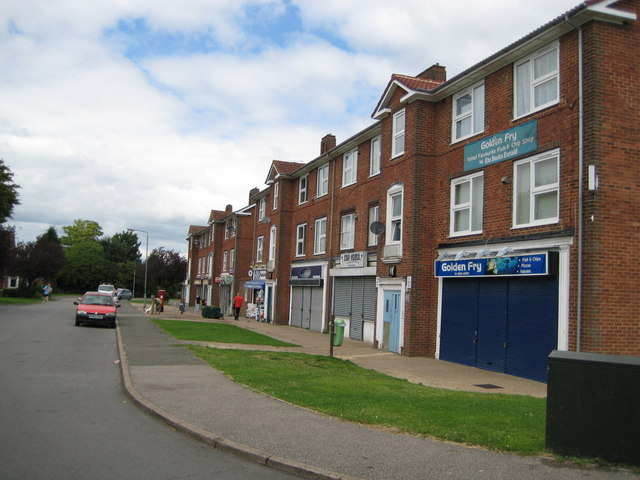
- Hampden Gardens shops

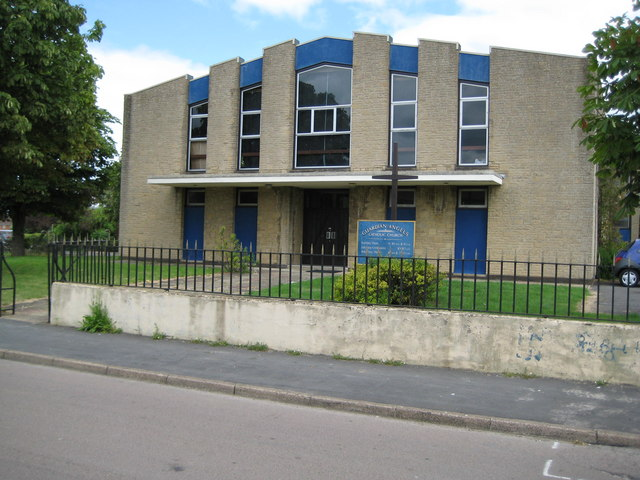
- Guardian Angels Roman Catholic Church

- Location within Buckinghamshire
- Population: 5,849 (2001 census); 6,912 (2011 Census. Ward)
- OS grid reference: SP8213
- Civil parish: Aylesbury
- Unitary authority: Buckinghamshire
- Ceremonial county: Buckinghamshire
- Region: South East
- Country: England
- Sovereign state: United Kingdom
- Post town: AYLESBURY
- Postcode district: HP21
- Dialling code: 01296
- Police: Thames Valley
- Fire: Buckinghamshire
- Ambulance: South Central
- UK Parliament: Aylesbury

Southcourt is a housing estate in Aylesbury, Buckinghamshire, England. Building commenced in the early 1920s through to the mid-1930s and only stopped because of the Second World War. It was turned into a post war housing estate during the years of 1946 and 1955. The area is named after the pig farm over which the housing estate was built.

== History ==
The oldest house in Southcourt is in Cottesloe Road on the junction of Clover Lane. This was the original farmhouse built at the start of the 20th century. The first sod for the rest of the estate was cut in 1922 by The Duke of York: hence one of the first roads of the estate was named York Place in his honour. At the time the housing was publicised as "Homes for Heroes", and the first houses on the estate were reserved solely for veterans of the First World War.

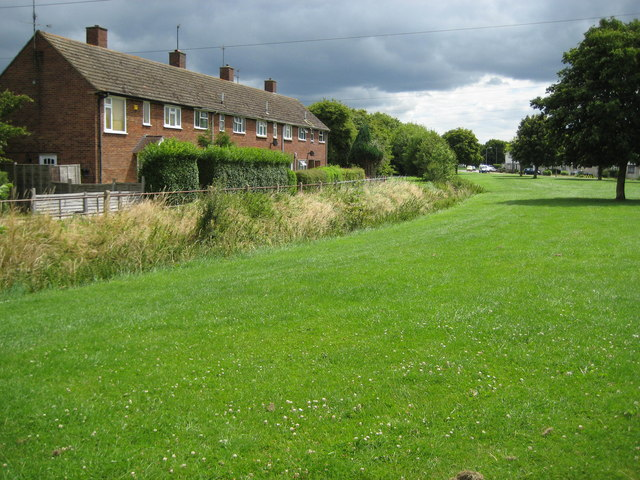
Southcourt brook

Until 1967, there used to be a 'Halt' at what was the pedestrian crossing from Old Stoke Road, Southcourt to Mandeville Road (closed in 2016). The 'Aylesbury South Halt' as it used to be known, was on the ex GWR (originally broad gauge) line to Princes Risborough and High Wycombe, a stop for the train into Aylesbury to pause for any passengers who wanted a short train journey into the centre of town. It comprised a small wooden platform and shelter.

The pre-war part of the estate consists of terraced and semi-detached redbrick and rendered houses, as well as blocks of low rise flats. The post war houses are built at a higher density and of brick, concrete and steel with timber (now plastic) cladding.

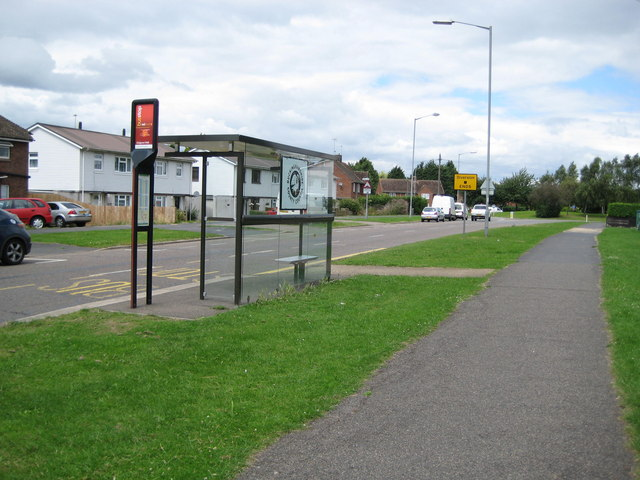
Bus stop on Churchill Avenue

The secondary school located in Southcourt is Mandeville School. The primary school is Oak Green School, which is a mixed community school that takes approximately 430 pupils from the age of four through to the age of eleven. In the 2001 census the population of Southcourt was 5,849 people.

== Demography ==
Southcourt compared
| 2001 UK Census | Southcourt ward | Aylesbury Vale borough | England |
| Population | 5,849 | 165,748 | 49,138,831 |
| Foreign born | 9.8% | 7.9% | 9.2% |
| White | 86.2% | 94.1% | 90.9% |
| Asian | 9.0% | 3.4% | 4.6% |
| Black | 1.9% | 1.0% | 2.3% |
| Christian | 62.9% | 73.8% | 71.7% |
| Muslim | 8.0% | 2.7% | 3.1% |
| Hindu | 0.7% | 0.5% | 1.1% |
| No religion | 19.6% | 15.7% | 14.6% |
| Unemployed | 4.4% | 2.0% | 3.3% |
| Retired | 9.9% | 11% | 13.5% |

At the 2001 UK census, the Southcourt electoral ward had a population of 5,849. The ethnicity was 86.2% white, 2.3% mixed race, 9% Asian, 1.9% black and 0.6% other. The place of birth of residents was 90.2% United Kingdom, 1.2% Republic of Ireland, 1.2% other Western European countries, and 7.4% elsewhere. Religion was recorded as 62.9% Christian, 0.1% Buddhist, 0.7% Hindu, 0.3% Sikh, 0.1% Jewish, and 8% Muslim. 19.6% were recorded as having no religion, 0.3% had an alternative religion and 8% did not state their religion.

The economic activity of residents aged 16–74 was 43.9% in full-time employment, 13.3% in part-time employment, 4.8% self-employed, 4.4% unemployed, 2.3% students with jobs, 2.9% students without jobs, 9.9% retired, 8.4% looking after home or family, 6.6% permanently sick or disabled and 3.5% economically inactive for other reasons. The industry of employment of residents was 23.7% retail, 14.3% manufacturing, 7.5% construction, 10.7% real estate, 12.7% health and social work, 5.3% education, 8.1% transport and communications, 3.8% public administration, 4.8% hotels and restaurants, 2.6% finance, 0.9% agriculture and 5.6% other. Compared with national figures, the ward had a relatively high proportion of workers in retail and health and social work. There were a relatively low proportion in agriculture and finance. Of the ward's residents aged 16–74, 8.9% had a higher education qualification or the equivalent, compared with 19.9% nationwide.
