= Princes Risborough railway station =

Railway station in Buckinghamshire, England

Coordinates: 51.718°N 0.844°W

Princes Risborough
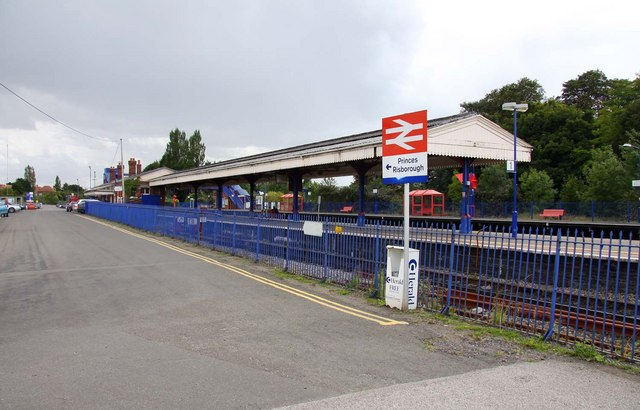
- Princes Risborough station in August 2009.

General information
- Location: Princes Risborough, Buckinghamshire; England
- Grid reference: SP799027
- Managed by: Chiltern Railways
- Platforms: 4
- Tracks: 5

Other information
- Station code: PRR
- Classification: DfT category D

History
- Original company: Wycombe Railway
- Pre-grouping: Great Western and Great Central Joint Railway
- Post-grouping: GW & GC Joint

Key dates
- 1 August 1862: Opened
- 15 August 1872: Services to Watlington begin
- 2 April 1906: Through services along GW&GCJR begin
- 1 July 1957: Services to Watlington withdrawn
- 7 January 1963: Services to Oxford via Thame withdrawn
- 15 August 2018: Heritage Railway services to Chinnor began

Passengers
- 2020/21: ▼0.107 million
- Interchange: ▼10,469
- 2021/22: ▲0.391 million
- Interchange: ▲25,279
- 2022/23: ▲0.463 million
- Interchange: ▲28,230
- 2023/24: ▲0.487 million
- Interchange: ▲58,975
- 2024/25: ▲0.513 million
- Interchange: ▲0.113 million
Location
Notes
- Passenger statistics from the Office of Rail and Road

Princes Risborough railway station is a stop on the Chiltern Main Line, serving the market town of Princes Risborough in Buckinghamshire, England. It is managed by Chiltern Railways, which operates all services that stop here.

== History ==
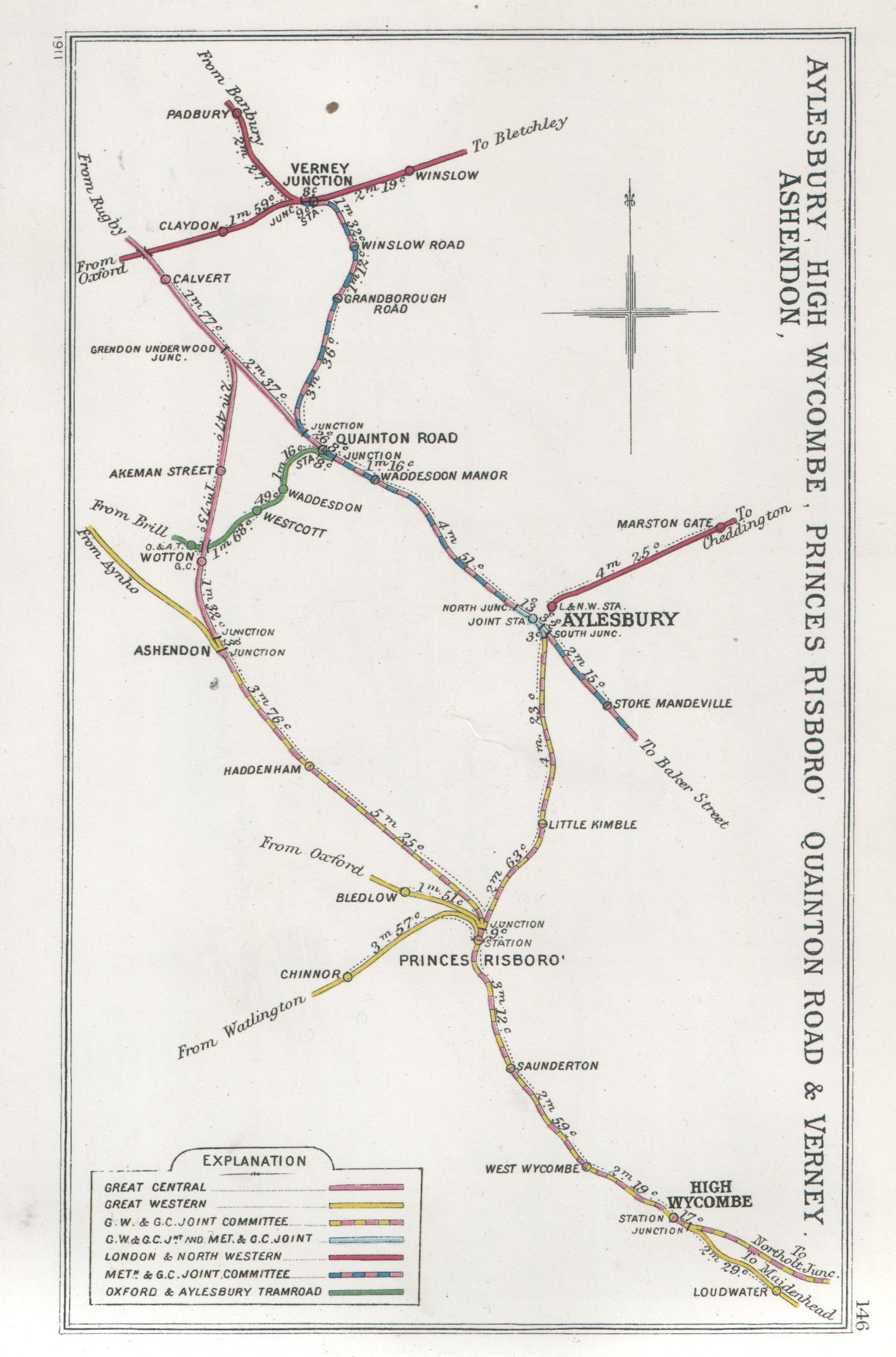
A 1911 Railway Clearing House map of railways in and around Princes Risborough

At one time, there were four different railway routes from the northern end of Princes Risborough station, although there has only ever been one to the south.

The first railway to reach the town was the Wycombe Railway, which opened its Oxford extension from High Wycombe as far as Thame on 1 August 1862. There were three intermediate stations on this section: West Wycombe, Princes Risborough and Bledlow. The cost of construction of the station building was £1,104 9s 5d and additional general costs were £824 8s 0d.

The station building as built was a typical Wycombe railway design with an open porch at the right hand end on the platform elevation, the design was the same as West Wycombe, Bledlow and Wheatley, and also on the original part of the Wycombe railway Cookham, Marlow Road, Wooburn Green and Loudwater. A branch of the Wycombe Railway was opened from Princes Risborough to Aylesbury on 1 October 1863. The Wycombe Railway was worked by the Great Western Railway and was absorbed by that railway in 1867.

The Watlington and Princes Risborough Railway opened its line on 15 August 1872; this railway became part of the GWR on 1 January 1884.

The original station building was located a few hundred yards further north than the present site. The original building was extended at the north end to provide extra office accommodation between 1870 and 1880; a curved roof canopy covering the platform may have also been added at the same time. Further additions to the building were made between 1894 and 1896.

A second platform was added when the Watlington branch was opened in 1872, although there was only a single track between the two platforms. In 1892, a new signal box was brought into use and a new passing loop, so the second platform was rebuilt with two tracks between them. A footbridge was also provided at this time.

The Great Western & Great Central Joint Committee was created with the dual objective of providing the Great Central Railway with a second route into London, bypassing the Metropolitan Railway and of providing the GWR with a shorter route to the Midlands. Central to this scheme was the upgrading of the existing GWR route between High Wycombe and Princes Risborough, which was transferred to the Joint Committee at its establishment on 1 August 1899. The line was extended in a north-westerly direction to Ashendon Junction, at which point the joint line ended, and a GCR route ran northwards to Grendon Underwood Junction, just south of Calvert; both sections opened for goods on 20 November 1905 and for passengers on 2 April 1906. Continuing in the same north-westerly direction from Ashendon Junction, the Bicester cut-off line, which was purely GWR property, was opened for goods trains on 4 April 1910 and to passengers on 1 July 1910.

The Watlington branch closed to passengers on 1 July 1957 and the route to Oxford via Thame closed on 7 January 1963; services over the GCR route ceased on 5 September 1966, this left the present network of two lines to the north to Banbury and to Aylesbury.

The station was transferred from the Western Region of British Rail to the London Midland Region on 24 March 1974.

Chiltern Railways considered reinstating the Wycombe Railway's Oxford extension via Thame, but instead constructed a chord at Bicester to permit services to run from the main line onto the westernmost section of the Varsity Line, restored between Bicester and Oxford; this permitted a new service to Oxford which opened in 2015.

Part of the Watlington branch line has been reopened by the Chinnor and Princes Risborough Railway, which extended its heritage railway service to the new platform 4 on the site of the former platform to Watlington; this opened in August 2018.

Originally, two through roads allowed non-stop running clear of the platform roads. Radical cuts on the Chiltern Main Line and Great Central Main Line in the 1960s left the station with only two usable platforms: the current platforms 1 and 2. In 1998, to increase capacity on the line, Chiltern Railways reinstated platform 3, the down platform, on top of the old down platform road, in a manner similar to that at West Ruislip. Fragments of the original down platform are still visible at the station. The up through road, removed from service as part of previous drastic running-down of the route which left only two usable platforms, was restored in September 2011 as part of Chiltern's Evergreen 3 upgrade project.

=== Signal box ===
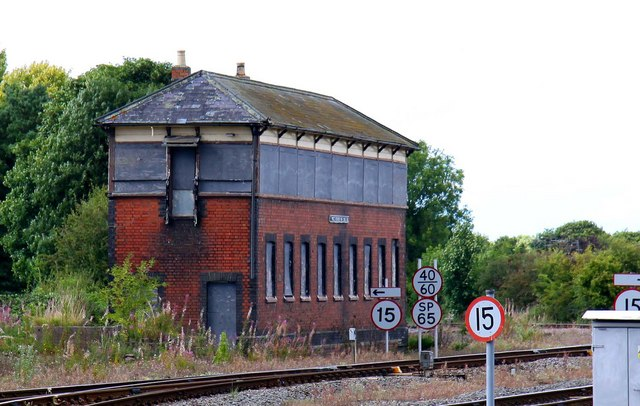
The signal box pictured in August 2009

Built in 1904, Princes Risborough North signal box, located towards the northern end of platform 3, is the largest surviving Great Western Railway signal box in the country. It closed in 1991, when modernisation of the line moved signalling operations to Marylebone; it became a Grade II listed building after a successful public campaign to save it from demolition.

The Chinnor and Princes Risborough Railway Association were granted an agreement with National Rail allowing them to maintain the box and undertake restoration work after a period of neglect left the box damaged by weather and vandals. Work had previously ceased in 1998 due to safety concerns but was resumed in 2013.

== Facilities ==
The ticket office is staffed for most of the day on weekdays and on Sundays; on Saturdays, the ticket office is staffed from the morning until early afternoon.

There are two self-service ticket machines located just outside the station for use by passengers when the ticket office is closed or busy. There are also departure screens located on all three platforms and inside the waiting room. The station has a waiting room, toilet facilities and step free access to all parts of the station; passengers reach platform 3 via lifts at either end of the footbridge. There is also a café.

Princes Risborough station currently has four platforms:

- Platform 1 for Aylesbury only (north-facing bay)
- Platform 2 for London via High Wycombe, and for Aylesbury (thru trains only)
- Platform 3 for Bicester, Banbury, Oxford and Birmingham
- Platform 4 for Chinnor on preserved Chinnor and Princes Risborough Railway.

== Services ==
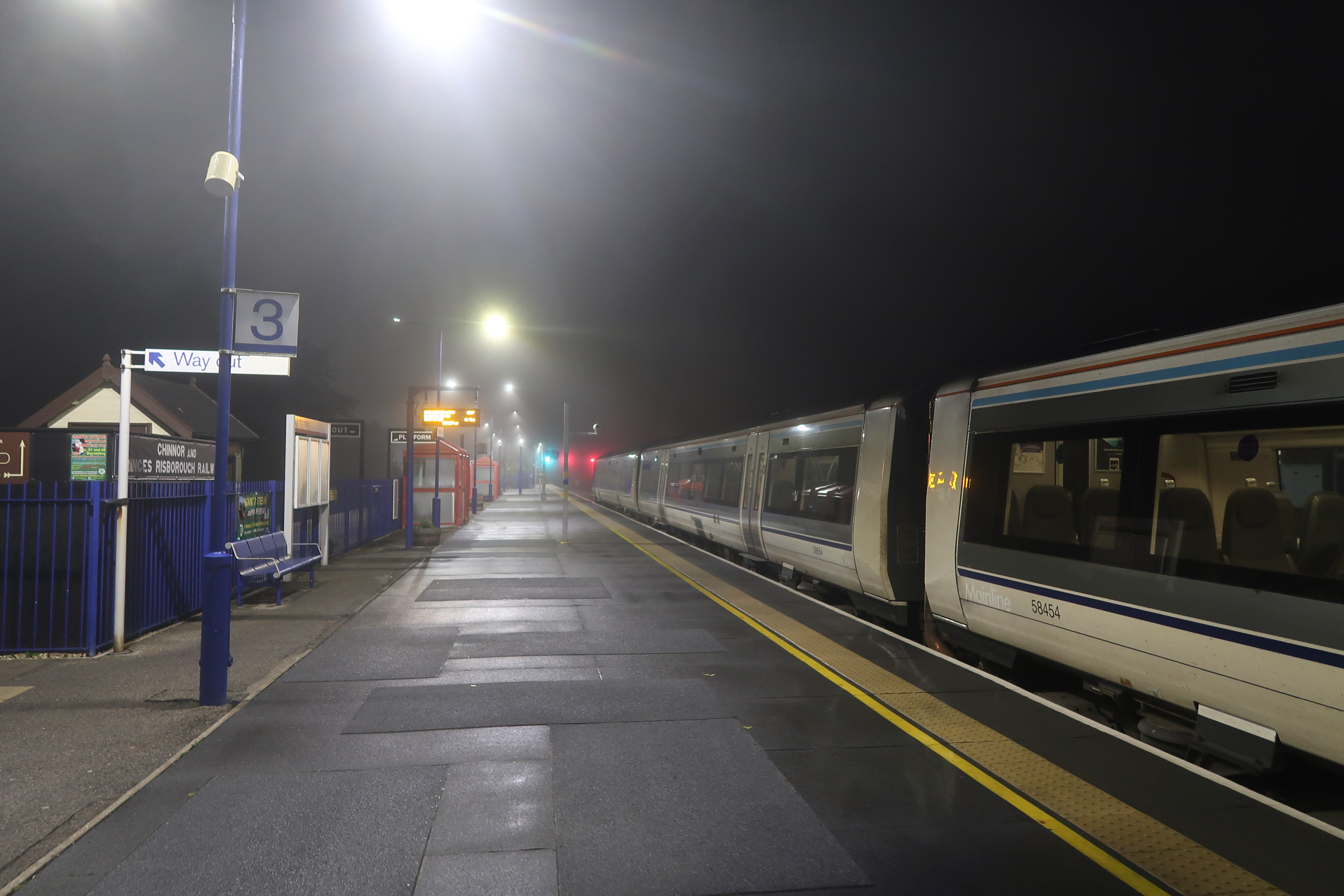
A view of platform 3 at night in November 2019

The weekday off-peak service consists of two trains per hour eastbound to London Marylebone and two trains per hour westbound to Oxford, with occasional peak-time calls from services to Banbury and Birmingham Snow Hill.

Additionally, the station is the terminus of shuttle services on the single-track line to Aylesbury which, since May 2023, run at alternating 60 and 90 minute intervals, with occasional services extending through to London Marylebone.

Preceding station	National Rail	Following station
High Wycombe	Chiltern Railways London–Oxford	Haddenham & Thame Parkway
Saunderton	Chiltern Railways London–Oxford	Bicester Village
Terminus	Chiltern Railways Princes Risborough–Aylesbury	Monks Risborough
Disused railways
Bledlow; Line and station closed	British Railways; Wycombe Railway	Saunderton; Line and station open
Terminus	British Railways; Watlington and Princes Risborough Railway	Bledlow Bridge Halt; Line and station closed
Ilmer Halt; Line open, station closed	Great Western Railway; Bicester "cut-off"	Terminus
Preceding station	Heritage railways	Following station
Chinnor Terminus	Chinnor & Princes Risborough Railway	Terminus
