= Watlington railway station (Oxfordshire) =

Oxfordshire railway terminus

Watlington
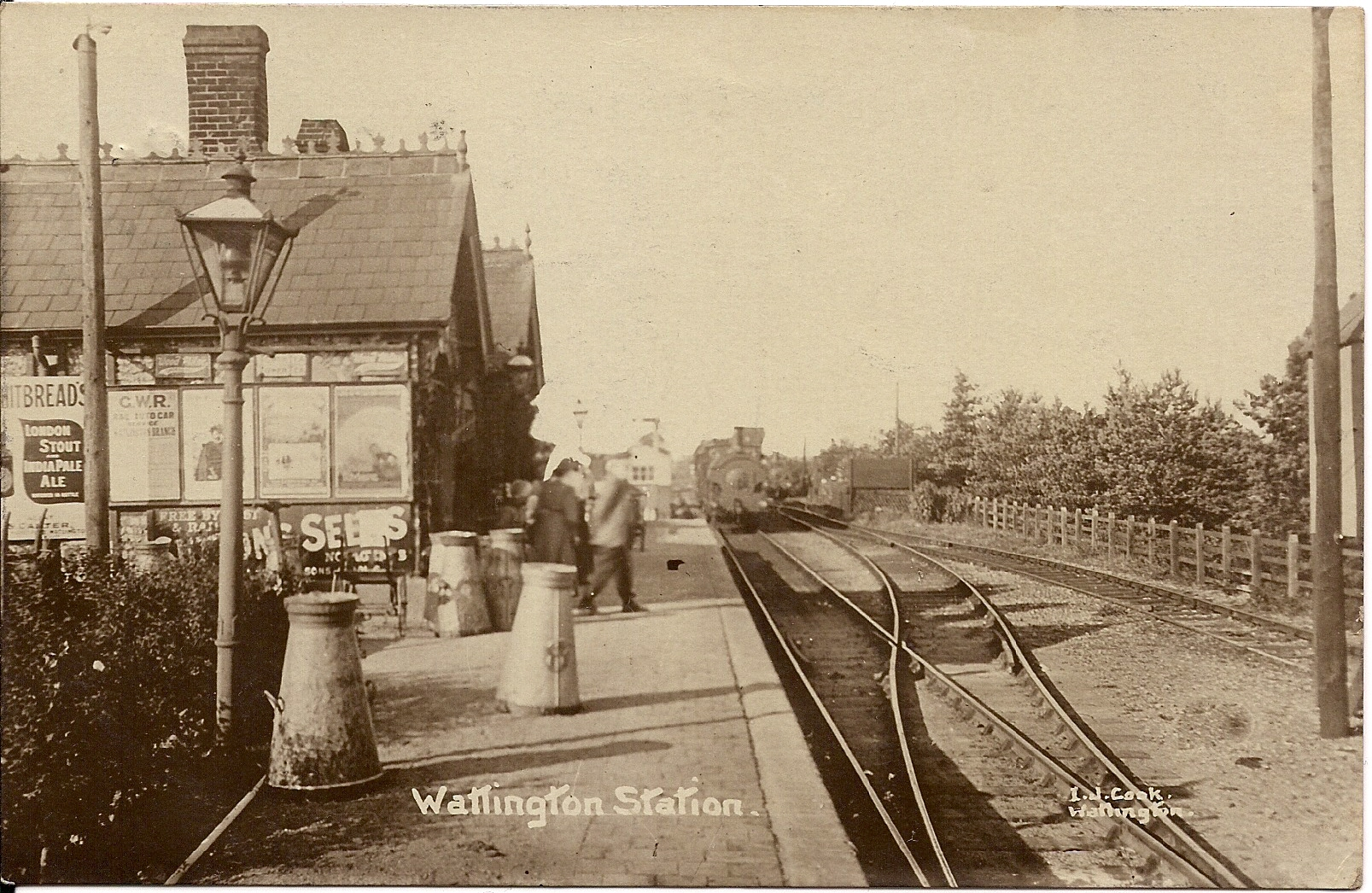

General information
- Location: Watlington, South Oxfordshire; England
- Coordinates: 51.6511°N 0.9953°W
- Grid reference: SU696952
- Platforms: 1

Other information
- Status: Disused

History
- Original company: Watlington and Princes Risborough Railway
- Pre-grouping: Great Western Railway
- Post-grouping: Great Western Railway

Key dates
- 15 August 1872: Station opened
- 1 July 1957: Station closed to passengers
- 2 January 1961: Station closed-completely
Location

Watlington railway station in Oxfordshire was the terminus of the Watlington and Princes Risborough Railway and opened in 1872. Watlington station was not in Watlington itself, but in the parish of Pyrton half a mile from Watlington.

The line was always single track. The facilities at Watlington station included a stone-built passenger building, a goods shed, and locomotive and carriage sheds.

The line was projected to be extended to Wallingford, where it would complete a cross-country line between Cholsey and Princes Risborough. Due to financial difficulties the Watlington - Wallingford section was never built.

British Railways closed the Watlington and Princes Risborough Railway to passengers in 1957 and to goods in 1961. Remains of the buildings exist, heavily overgrown, on private land.

== See also ==
- List of closed railway stations in Britain

== Bibliography ==
- Karau, Paul; Turner, Chris (1998). Country branch line: An intimate portrait of the Watlington branch. Vol 1: The story of the line from 1872-1961. Didcot: Wild Swan. ISBN 1-874103-43-7.
- Karau, Paul; Turner, Chris (1998). Country branch line: An intimate portrait of the Watlington branch. Vol 2: The stations. Didcot: Wild Swan. ISBN 1-874103-46-1.
- Oppitz, Leslie (2000). Lost Railways of the Chilterns. Newbury: Countryside Books. pp. 20–23. ISBN 1-85306-643-5.
- Holden, J S (1974). The Watlington Branch. Oxford Publishing Co. ISBN 0-902888-41-2.

Preceding station	Disused railways	Following station
Lewknor Bridge Halt; Line and station closed	Great Western Railway; Watlington and Princes Risborough Railway	Terminus
