= Wainhill Crossing Halt railway station =

Railway station in England

Coordinates: 51.7055°N 0.8931°W

Wainhill Crossing Halt
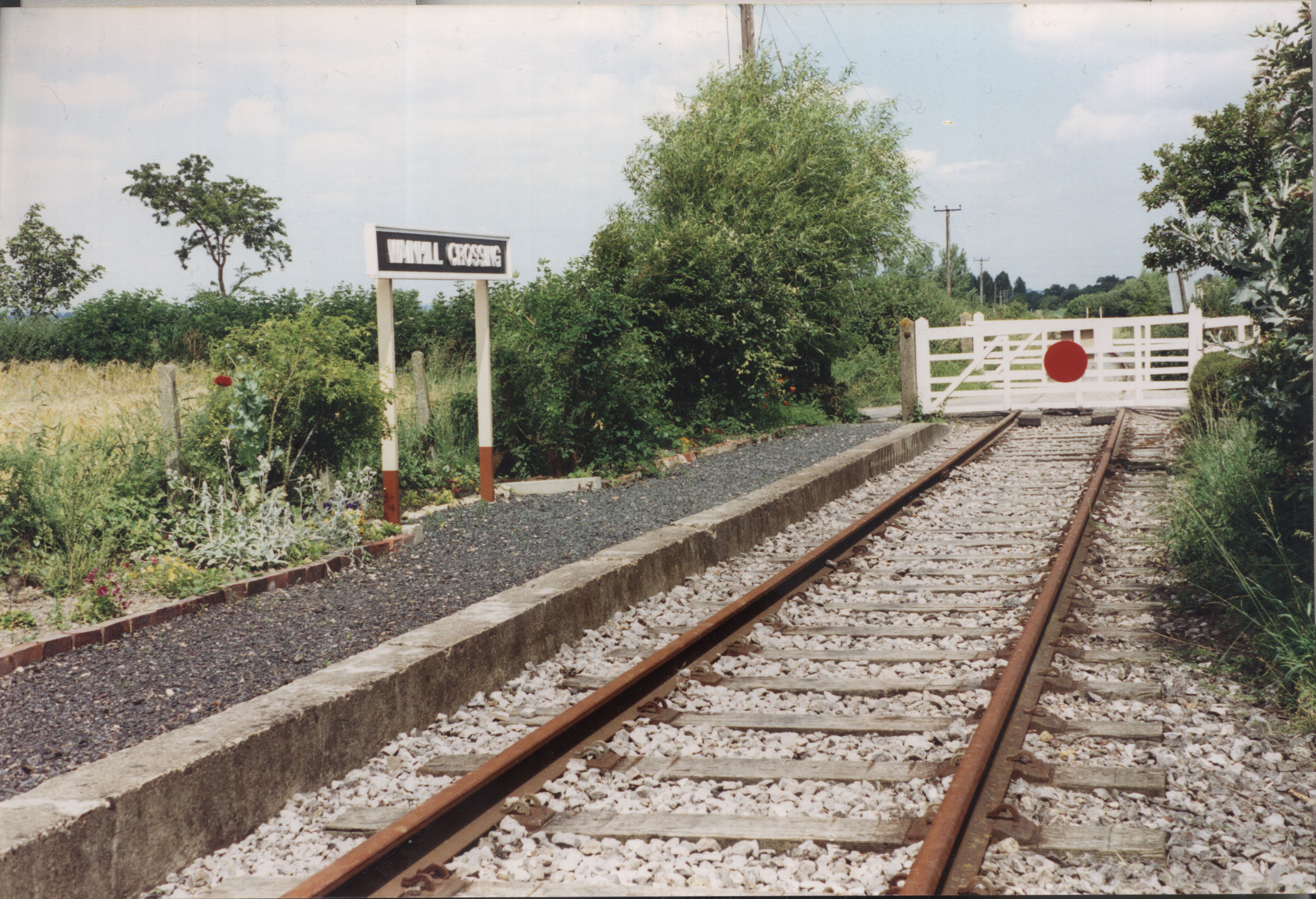
- Wainhill Crossing Halt in 1991 following restoration by the Chinnor & Princes Risborough Railway.

General information
- Location: Lower Wainhill, nr Chinnor, South Oxfordshire; England
- Grid reference: SP765013
- Platforms: 1

Other information
- Status: Not open to passengers but restored

History
- Original company: Great Western Railway
- Post-grouping: Great Western Railway; Western Region of British Railways

Key dates
- 1 August 1925: Station opened
- 1 July 1957: Closed
Location

Wainhill Crossing Halt is a halt on the Watlington and Princes Risborough Railway which the Great Western Railway opened in 1925 to serve the Oxfordshire hamlet of Wainhill. The opening of the halt was part of a GWR attempt to encourage more passengers on the line at a time when competition from bus services was drawing away patronage.

== History ==
Opened in 1925, the halt - the last station to open on the line - sought to encourage passenger traffic in the face of increased competition from buses. It was situated to the south of a level crossing over an unclassified road leading to Lower Wainhill and Hempton Wainhill. The lane saw very occasional traffic as it was unsuitable for motor vehicles and only served nine or ten houses on the eastern side of the Watlington and Princes Risborough Railway. A modest crossing keeper's cottage had been provided by the railway company which comprised two ground floor rooms and one bedroom on the first floor; there was no mains water, gas or electricity. The crossing keeper was responsible for keeping the lamps alight on the gates and, once the station had opened, trimming and lighting the two oil hurricane lamps hung on posts to illuminate the single platform.

Following the withdrawal of passenger services in 1957, the line through Wainhill Crossing remained open until July 1990 for the purposes of coal, gypsum and cement movements to and from the Rugby Portland Cement Company's factory near Chinnor. Negotiating Wainhill Crossing, by this time unstaffed, required trains to be brought to a halt by the crossing whilst a crew member opened and closed the gates; this was particularly awkward as the line descends at a 1 in 73 gradient here and was subject to a speed restriction of 5 mph.

| Preceding station | Historical railways | Following station |
|---|---|---|
| Bledlow Bridge Halt; Line open, station closed | Great Western Railway; Watlington and Princes Risborough Railway | Chinnor; Line and station open |

== Present day ==
Wainhill Crossing Halt has been rebuilt by the Chinnor and Princes Risborough Railway which has reopened the line through the station. The halt is not however open to passengers. Wainhill Crossing is staffed when services are running and a train must stop or slow down unless a green flag is shown by the crossing keeper. In accordance with the Transport and Works Order granted to the CPRR for the operation of services, the crossing gates must be kept closed and locked across the railway except when services are crossing. The gates must also be kept conspicuously white with red reflectors and lamps must be used when it gets dark. The crossing keeper's cottage is still standing and is in private ownership.

== Sources ==
- Butt, R. V. J. (October 1995). The Directory of Railway Stations: details every public and private passenger station, halt, platform and stopping place, past and present (1st ed.). Sparkford: Patrick Stephens Ltd. ISBN 978-1-85260-508-7. OCLC 60251199. OL 11956311M.
- Clinker, C.R. (October 1978). Clinker's Register of Closed Passenger Stations and Goods Depots in England, Scotland and Wales 1830-1977. Bristol: Avon-Anglia Publications & Services. ISBN 0-905466-19-5.
- Jowett, Alan (2000). Jowett's Nationalised Railway Atlas (1st ed.). Penryn, Cornwall: Atlantic Transport Publishers. ISBN 978-0-906899-99-1. OCLC 228266687.
- Jowett, Alan (March 1989). Jowett's Railway Atlas of Great Britain and Ireland: From Pre-Grouping to the Present Day (1st ed.). Sparkford: Patrick Stephens Ltd. ISBN 978-1-85260-086-0. OCLC 22311137.
- Karau, Paul; Turner, Chris (1998). Country branch line: An intimate portrait of the Watlington branch. Vol 2: The stations. Didcot: Wild Swan. ISBN 1-874103-46-1.
- Mitchell, Vic; Smith, Keith (April 2003). Branch Lines to Princes Risborough from Aylesbury, Oxford and Watlington. Midhurst, West Sussex: Middleton Press. ISBN 1-904474-05-5.
- Oppitz, Leslie (2000). Lost Railways of the Chilterns. Newbury: Countryside Books. ISBN 1-85306-643-5.
- Simpson, Bill (2001). A History of the Railways in Oxfordshire; Part 2: The South. Witney, Oxon: Lamplight Publications. ISBN 978-1-899246-06-9.
