= Little Kimble railway station =

Railway station in Buckinghamshire, England

Coordinates: 51.752°N 0.808°W

Little Kimble
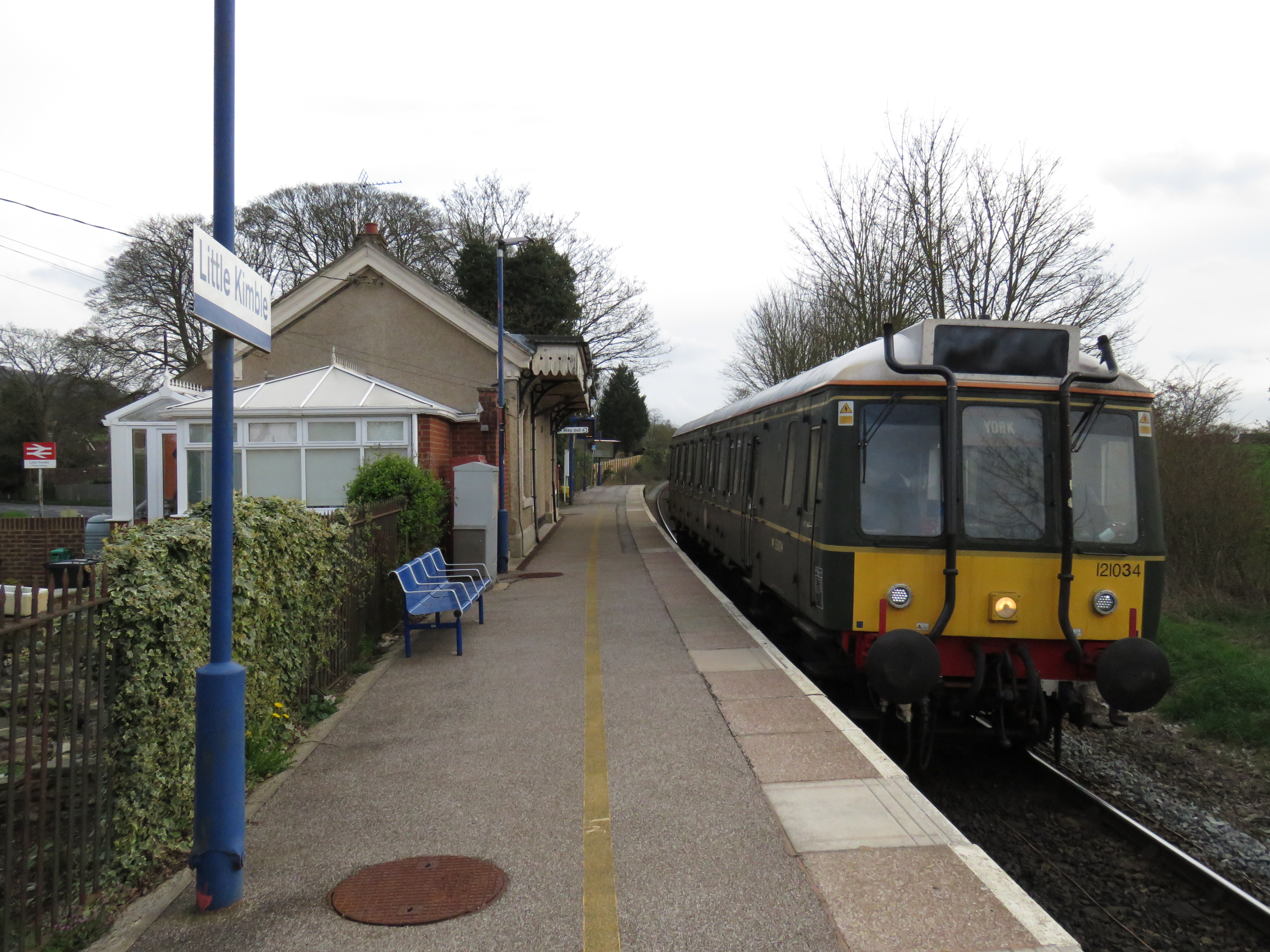

General information
- Location: Little Kimble, Buckinghamshire; England
- Grid reference: SP823066
- Manager: Chiltern Railways
- Platforms: 1

Other information
- Station code: LTK
- Classification: DfT category F2

History
- Opened: 1872
- Original company: Wycombe Railway
- Pre-grouping: Great Western and Great Central Joint Railway
- Post-grouping: GW & GC Joint

Passengers
- 2021/22: ▲8,460
- 2022/23: ▲9,896
- 2023/24: ▼8,086
- 2024/25: ▲8,926
- 2025/26: ▲11,562
Location
Notes
- Passenger statistics from the Office of Rail and Road

Little Kimble railway station is a small, single platform railway station serving the village of Little Kimble and the nearest Ellsborough in Buckinghamshire, England.

== History ==
The Wycombe Railway opened the line from Princes Risborough to Aylesbury on 1 October 1863. The Great Western Railway took over the Wycombe Railway in 1867 and opened Little Kimble station in 1872. The station building once had ornate stone chimneys, and was identical to the "up" platform building at Kings Sutton.

The station was transferred from the Western Region of British Rail to the London Midland Region on 24 March 1974.

In 1998 Little Kimble received the British Royal Train. The G8 Summit was held in Birmingham that year and the wives of the G8 countries' leaders, including Cherie Blair and Hillary Clinton, were taken to Chequers via the Royal Train and Little Kimble, which is the nearest station to Chequers. The train reversed at Princes Risborough and the wives alighted at Little Kimble, whence they were transferred to Chequers via limousine.

Little Kimble is in an area of the country where edible dormice (Glis glis) are common and, in 2010, they made their home in the ticket machine meaning that travellers could not buy their tickets.

== Services ==
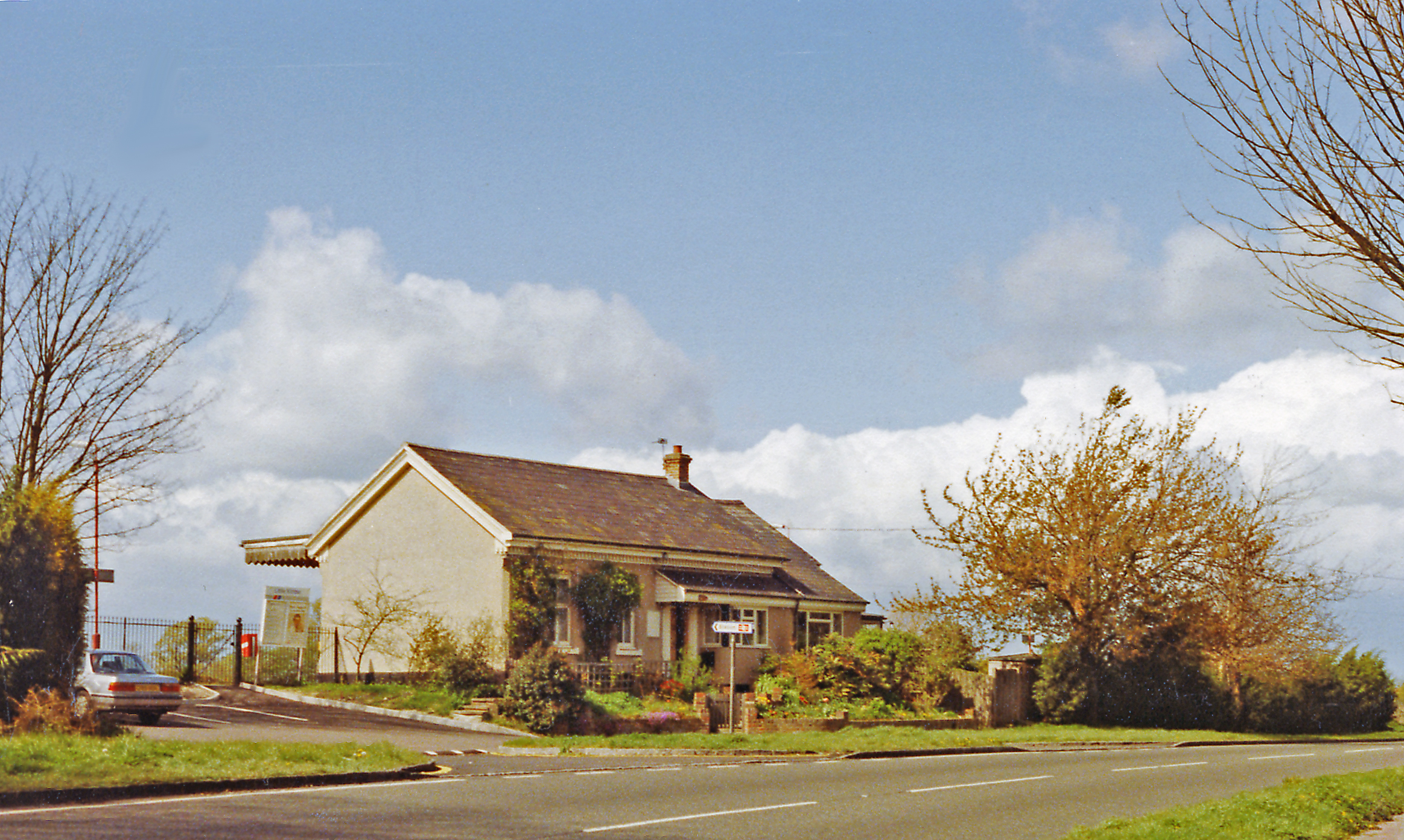
The station approach

The station is served by trains operated by Chiltern Railways between London Marylebone and Aylesbury. Services mostly every 90 minutes between Princes Risborough and Aylesbury. Most services after 21:30 operate to/from London Marylebone as well as the first two trains in the morning between 5-6am. However, on weekends there is an hourly service from Aylesbury through to London Marylebone.

Preceding station	National Rail	Following station
Aylesbury	Chiltern Railways; Princes Risborough to Aylesbury Line	Monks Risborough
	Historical railways	
South Aylesbury Halt; Line open, station closed	Western Region of British Railways; Aylesbury–Princes Risborough line	Monks Risborough; Line and station open
