= Chinnor railway station =

Heritage railway station in England

Chinnor
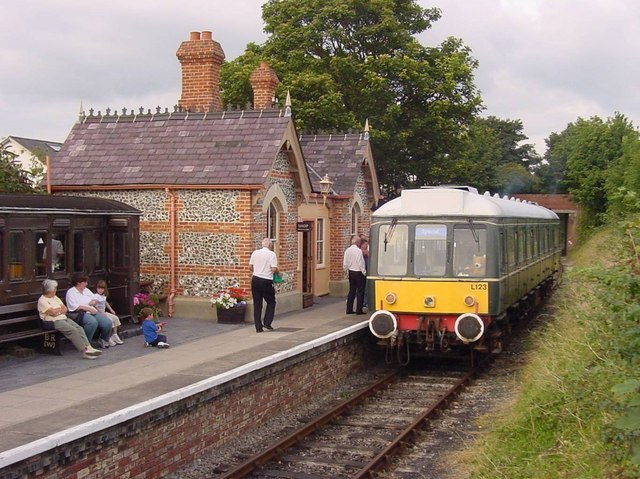
- Chinnor railway station in August 2008

General information
- Location: Chinnor, South Oxfordshire; England
- Coordinates: 51.6978°N 0.9069°W
- Grid reference: SP756004
- Platforms: 1

Other information
- Status: Heritage railway

History
- Original company: Watlington and Princes Risborough Railway
- Pre-grouping: Great Western Railway
- Post-grouping: Great Western Railway

Key dates
- 15 August 1872: Opened
- 1 July 1957: Closed
- 20 August 1994: Reopened
Location

Chinnor railway station in Oxfordshire is on the line of the former Watlington and Princes Risborough Railway. The station was reopened by the Chinnor and Princes Risborough Railway Association in 1994 after a period of disuse.

== History ==
First opened in 1872 to serve Chinnor and the surrounding villages, the line was projected to be extended to Wallingford, where it would complete a cross-country line between Cholsey and Princes Risborough. However, due to financial difficulties the Watlington - Wallingford section was never built. The line was always single track.

British Railways closed the Watlington and Princes Risborough Railway to passengers in 1957 and to goods in 1961. The station was demolished but the section of line between Princes Risborough and Chinnor remained open for cement traffic until 1989.

Current access to the station is from the 'wrong' side of the tracks compared with the original layout (i.e. you have to cross the line to get to the station).

== Routes ==
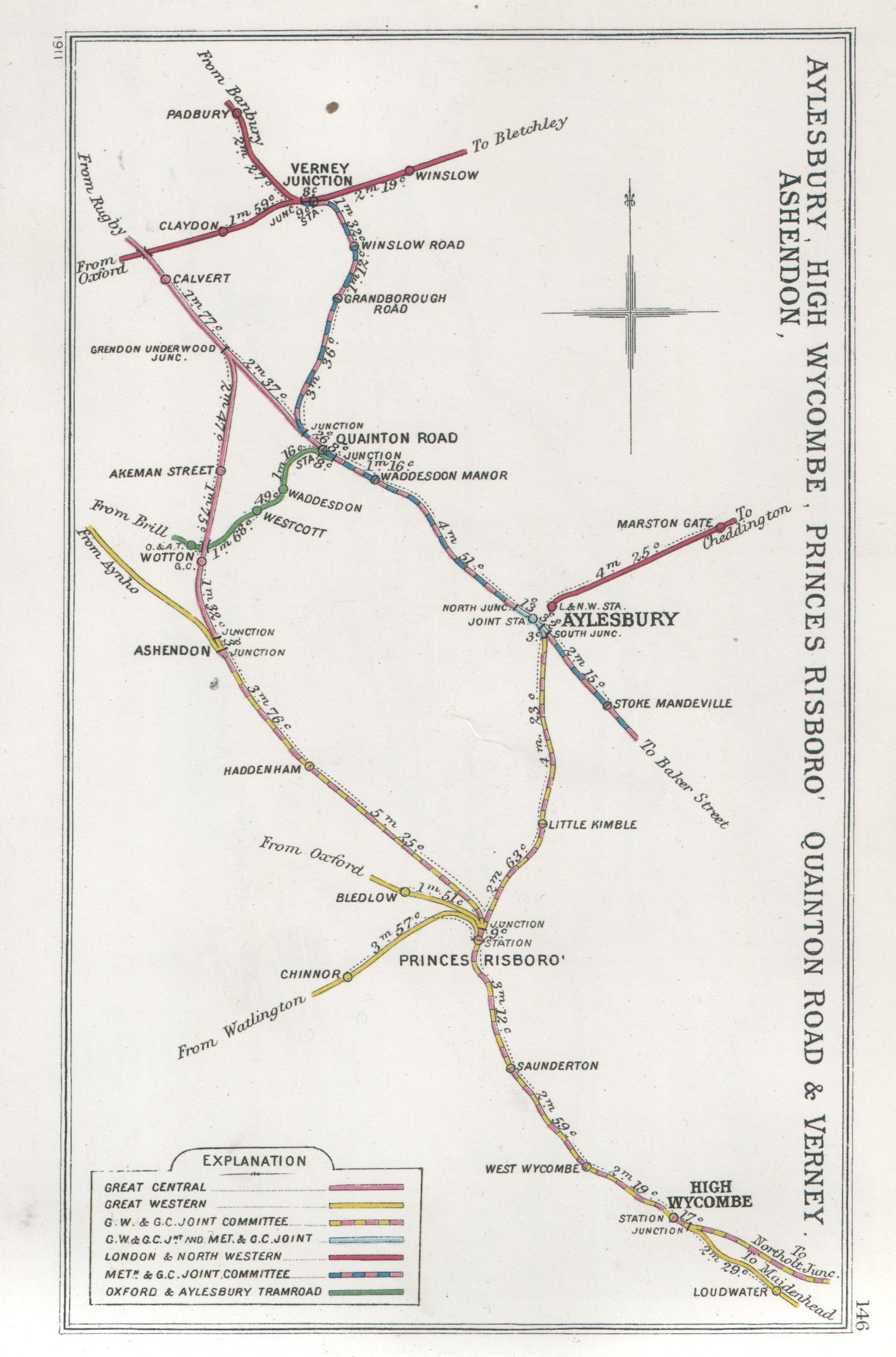
A 1911 Railway Clearing House map of railways in the vicinity of Chinnor

Preceding station	Heritage railways	Following station
Terminus	Chinnor & Princes Risborough Railway	Princes Risborough Terminus
Historical railways
Wainhill Crossing Halt; Line open, station closed	Great Western Railway; Watlington and Princes Risborough Railway	Kingston Crossing Halt; Line and station closed

== Bibliography ==
- Karau, Paul; Turner, Chris (1998). Country branch line: An intimate portrait of the Watlington branch. Vol 1: The story of the line from 1872-1961. Didcot: Wild Swan. ISBN 1-874103-43-7.
- Karau, Paul; Turner, Chris (1998). Country branch line: An intimate portrait of the Watlington branch. Vol 2: The stations. Didcot: Wild Swan. ISBN 1-874103-46-1.
- Oppitz, Leslie (2000). Lost Railways of the Chilterns. Newbury: Countryside Books. pp. 20–23. ISBN 1-85306-643-5.
