= Chinnor and Princes Risborough Railway =

English standard gauge heritage railway

Coordinates: 51.6980°N 0.9063°W

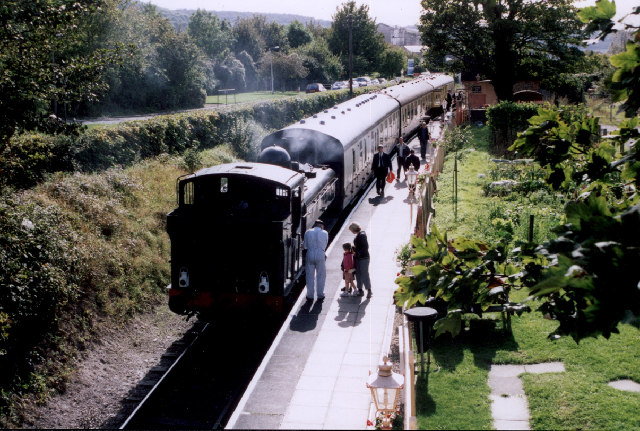
- 5700 class Pannier tank 9682 waits while passengers board at Chinnor station on the preserved Chinnor and Princes Risborough Railway in September 2004
- Locale: Buckinghamshire and Oxfordshire, England
- Terminus: Chinnor and Princes Risborough
- Connections: Chiltern Main Line at Princes Risborough

Commercial operations
- Name: Watlington and Princes Risborough Railway Company
- Original gauge: 4 ft 8 1/2 in (1,435 mm) standard gauge

Preserved operations
- Operated by: Chinnor and Princes Risborough Railway
- Stations: 2
- Length: 4 miles (6.4 km)
- Preserved gauge: 4 ft 8 1/2 in (1,435 mm) standard gauge

Commercial history
- Opened: 15 August 1872
- Closed: 1 July 1957 (passenger); 20 December 1989 (goods)

Preservation history
- August 1989: C&PRR formed
- 26 July 1994: Transport and Works Order active
- 20 August 1994: First public service
- 1996: Extended to Thame Junction
- 23 July 2016: First train into Princes Risborough
- March 2017: Lease Agreement signed with Network Rail for Princes Risborough Platform 4
- 15 August 2018: Opening of rebuilt Platform 4
- Headquarters: Chinnor

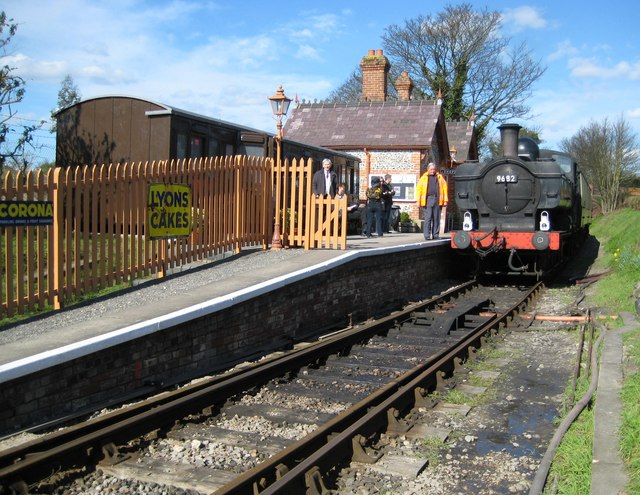
Chinnor station is the headquarters of the preserved Chinnor & Princes Risborough Railway, March 2008

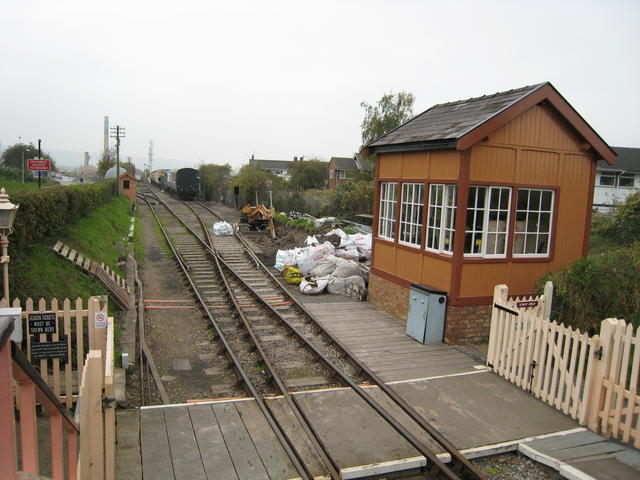
The run round loop and sidings, October 2007

The Chinnor and Princes Risborough Railway is a preserved standard gauge heritage railway with its headquarters and main station at Chinnor in South Oxfordshire, England. It runs along the foot of the Chilterns escarpment. Although a little distance away, it has been given the nickname 'The Icknield Line' for its connection to the Lower Icknield Way.

== History ==
The line was part of the former Great Western Railway branch line between Watlington and Princes Risborough. British Railways closed the line to passenger traffic in 1957. The section between Chinnor and Princes Risborough thereafter carried a freight-only cement service until 1989.

== Preservation ==
=== Reopening ===
The Chinnor and Princes Risborough Railway Association was formed around August 1989. On 19 May 1991, the first train – a works train headed by a 0-4-0 Baguley diesel – ran from Chinnor. It began to operate passenger trains between Chinnor and the site of the former Wainhill Halt (about 1 km NE of Chinnor) in August 1994. In 1995, the route was extended by about 3 km to Horsenden Lane, and then to the old rail connection that led trains to Oxford now known as Thame Junction in 1996. On 21 February 2016, the railway was connected to the main line at Princes Risborough, with services commencing later that year running in to a siding adjacent to Platform 4 at Princes Risborough while works were being undertaken to rebuild the platform there. Some service trains were not always able to run that far either due to Network Rail / Chiltern Railways requirements or other works related to platform reinstatement and continued to terminate at Thame Junction.

The railway now operates between Chinnor and platform 4 at Princes Risborough, although some services may continue to terminate and turn around at Thame Junction for operational reasons. There is no platform at Thame Junction. Work to reinstate platform 4 at Princes Risborough was completed in August 2018.

=== Princes Risborough extension ===
Following discussions with Network Rail, an extension of about a mile (1.5 km) to Princes Risborough main line railway station was undertaken, with a view to running into Princes Risborough station. This would allow passengers to connect from Chiltern Railways services on the Chiltern Main Line. Previously, the line was reconnected at a point just yards from the head shunt at Thame Junction for special events to allow trains to run into Princes Risborough station: in October 2013, the line was reconnected for the first 3 weekends for the Railway's "Haversham & Friends" celebrations, and the first through-train for 57 years, a rail tour from Aylesbury via Princes Risborough, ran on 5 October 2013.

On 21 February 2016, a small team of volunteers used a road-rail vehicle to install a track panel in place of a Network Rail buffer stop to reinstate the physical connection to Princes Risborough; the following day, official boundary gates and safety signage were installed, making the line operational. With the extension in place, the line is 4 miles (6.4 km) in length. The link was used for the first time by a visiting locomotive as part of the diesel gala held on 4/5 June 2016; DB Cargo Class 66 66185 hauled 3-CEP 411198 on the 0950 from Chinnor. A test run with a single-car DMU was operated on 25 June with the train running into Princes Risborough's temporary platform 4, followed a week later by a Class 17 working and then a steam-run on 10 July. The first full public service carrying VIP guests to Risborough ran on 23 July, hauled by D3018 Haversham with the return journey worked by GWR 0-6-0PT 5786 (L.92).

Bay platform 4 of the original Watlington branch has been reconstructed at Princes Risborough by the preserved railway using, where possible, materials recovered from the site; with that work completed, Chinnor & Princes Risborough Railway passengers are now able to join or leave trains at Princes Risborough on certain services. The Chinnor and Princes Risborough Railway held an official opening ceremony of the Platform on 15 August 2018.

A purpose built Maintenance and Education centre at a site some 200 yards south of Chinnor station has been opened.

In July 2025 the railway opened a newly constructed independent line which will allow trains to run into Princes Risborough without having to use the Network Rail-owned line.

=== Future projects ===
Extending the line to the southwest from Chinnor towards Aston Rowant near the A40, taking its total length to 6 miles (9.7 km).

== On-screen appearances ==
Chinnor station has been used for the filming of various TV series including Miss Marple and Midsomer Murders.
