= Aylesbury–Princes Risborough line =

Railway line in Buckinghamshire, England

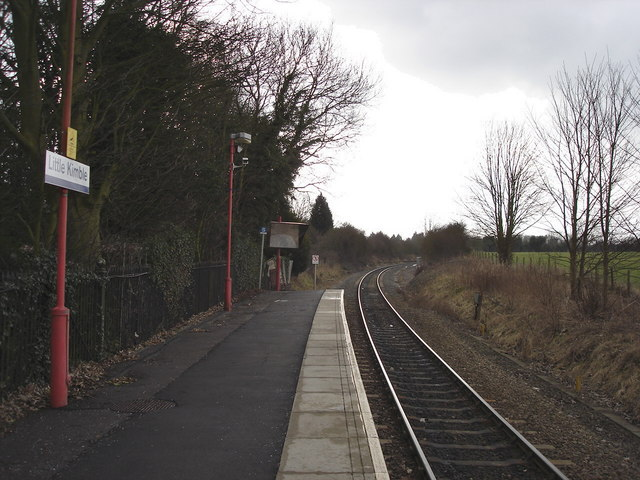
- Little Kimble railway station, a typical rural village halt on this single track line

Overview
- Status: Operational
- Owner: Network Rail
- Locale: Buckinghamshire; South East England
- Termini: Princes Risborough; Aylesbury
- Stations: 2

Service
- Type: Rural branch line, Heavy rail
- System: National Rail
- Services: 1
- Operator(s): Chiltern Railways
- Rolling stock: Class 165 "Networker Turbo"; Class 168 "Clubman"

History
- Opened: 1863

Technical
- Number of tracks: 1
- Track gauge: 1,435 mm (4 ft 8 1/2 in) standard gauge
- Old gauge: 7 ft (2,134 mm)
Route map
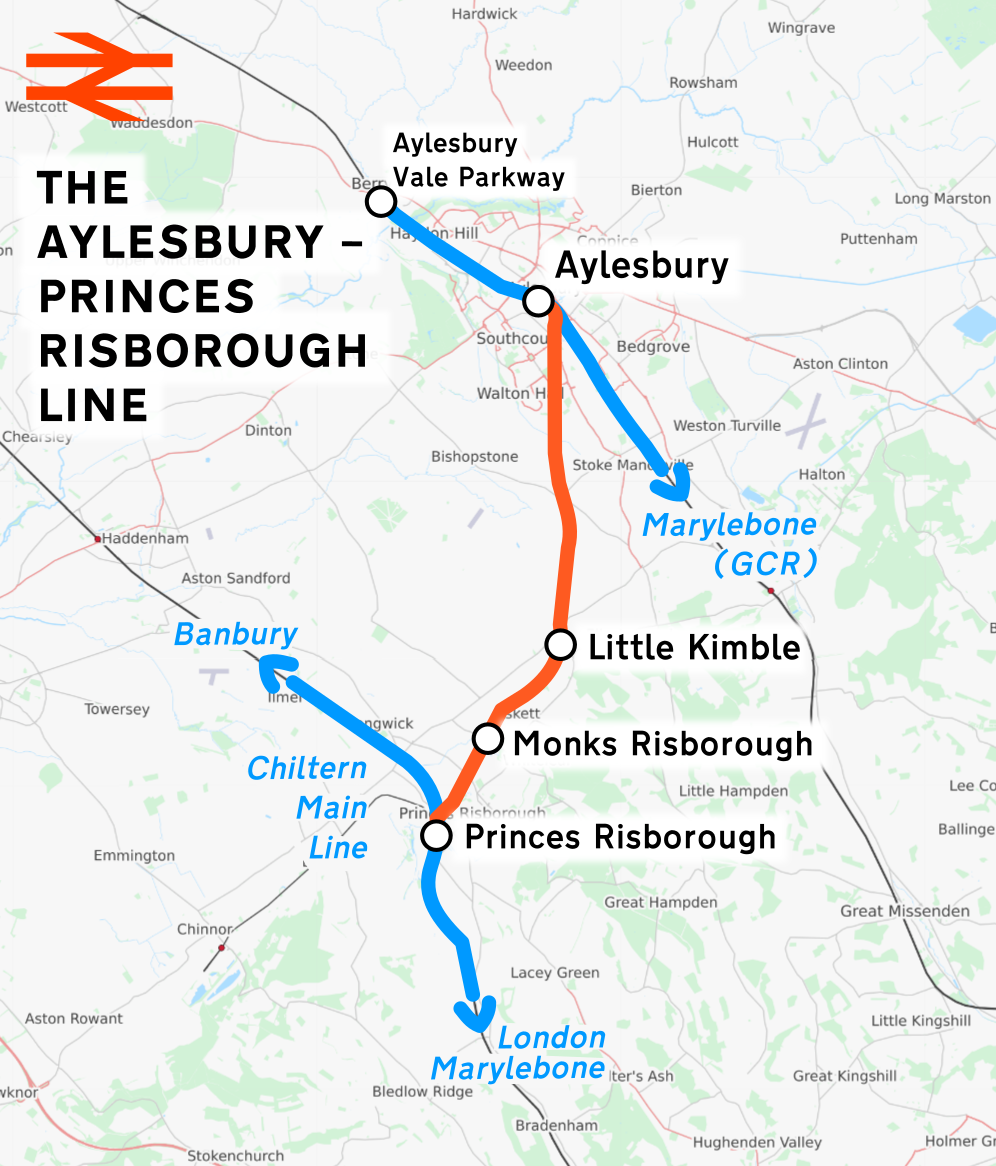
(Click to expand)

The Aylesbury–Princes Risborough line is a rural branch line between Princes Risborough and Aylesbury in Buckinghamshire, England. The line is single track throughout with a maximum speed of 40 mph (64 km/h).

== History ==
The line was built as a single track broad gauge branch of the Wycombe Railway in 1863. The branch became part of the Great Western Railway when the latter took over the Wycombe Railway in 1867. The GWR converted the line to standard gauge in 1870. The branch was incorporated into the newly formed Great Western and Great Central Joint Railway in 1906. Network SouthEast made the branch part of its Chiltern subdivision in the 1980s.

== Traffic ==
Passenger services are now operated by Chiltern Railways. The line is regularly used by freight services operated by DB Cargo UK and Freightliner. The trains, referred to as "binliners", carry waste from London to a waste facility near the site of the former Great Central Railway station at Calvert. For this purpose, during Chiltern Railways' Evergreen 2 project the line was resignalled with two new signals at Little Kimble, one for each direction of travel. These allow two trains to travel in the same direction, thus allowing a passenger service to follow the freight train or vice versa.

== Services ==
The current timetable, produced for December 2019, offers one passenger service per hour in each direction, with services outside the weekday morning and evening peaks operating directly between Aylesbury and London Marylebone. In peak periods a shuttle service operates between Aylesbury and Princes Risborough, with a change onto connecting services needed at Princes Risborough for onward travel towards London. Not all services stop at Little Kimble.
