= Watlington and Princes Risborough Railway =

Former railway company in Oxfordshire, England

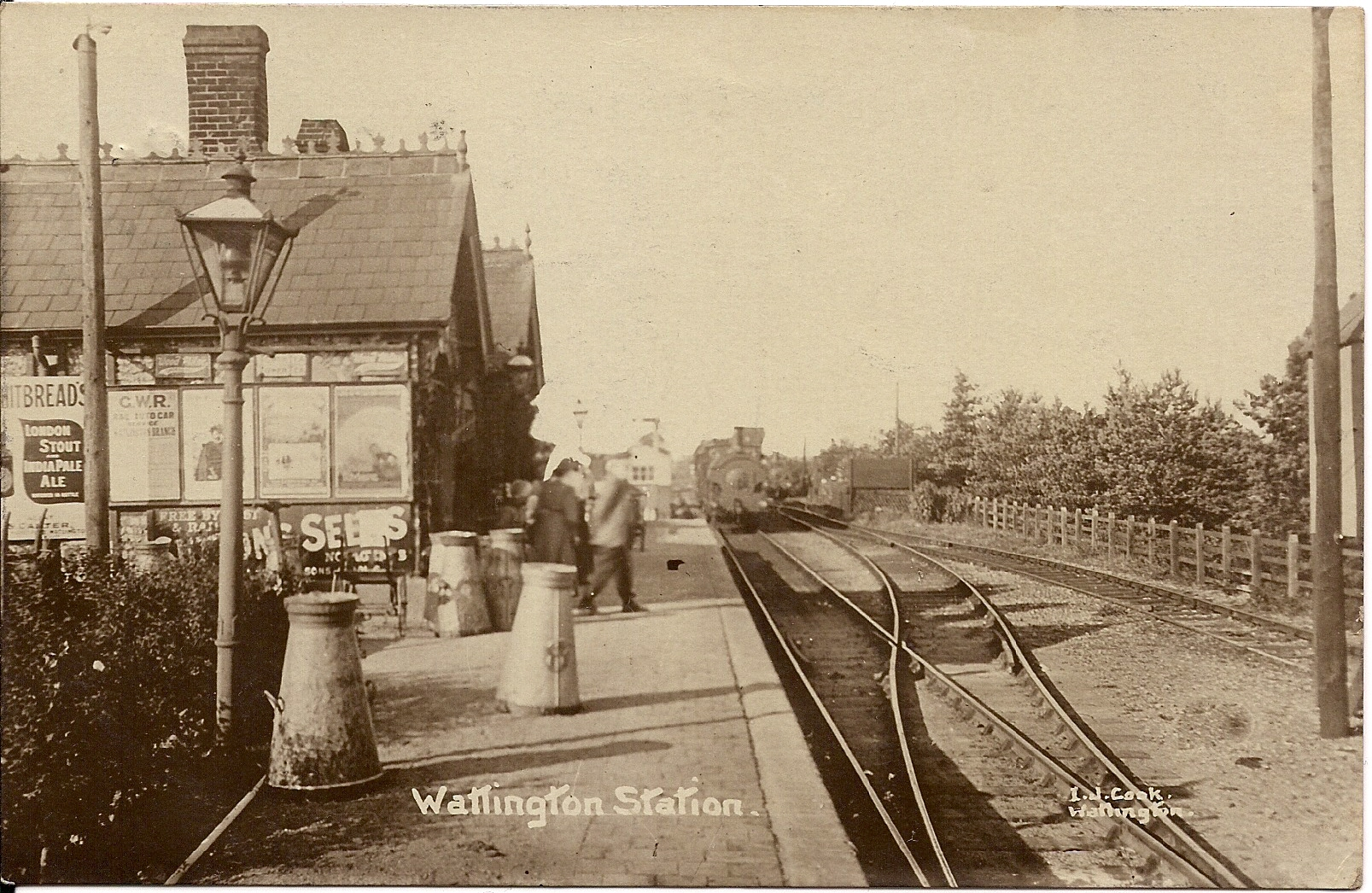
- Watlington in the 19th century

Overview
- Stations called at: 8: Princes Risborough (mainline terminus); Bledlow Bridge Halt (opened 1 September 1906); Wainhill Crossing Halt(opened 1 August 1925); Chinnor; Kingston Crossing Halt (opened 1 September 1906); Aston Rowant; Lewknor Bridge Halt (opened 1 September 1906); Watlington (terminus)
- Dates of operation: 1872– Closed to passengers: 1 July 1957; Freight: 20 December 1989
- Successor: Chinnor and Princes Risborough Railway

Technical
- Track gauge: 4 ft 8+1/2 in Standard Gauge
- Previous gauge: 7 ft Broad Gauge
- Length: 9 mi (14 km) (original)
- Track length: 2.7 mi (4.3 km) (current)

The Watlington and Princes Risborough Railway was an independent English railway company that opened a line between the Oxfordshire towns of Watlington and Chinnor in 1872. The 9 mi (14 km) branch, which connected to the Great Western Railway (GWR) at Princes Risborough, did not make any money and was taken over in 1883 by GWR resulting in its investors sustaining considerable losses.

In 1863 the Wallingford and Watlington Railway was proposed to link Wallingford and Watlington to the Great Western main line at Wallingford Road but this was only opened as far as Wallingford in 1866 before running out of money. In 1868 the Thame Gazette reported a proposal for a scheme to link Watlington to Princes Risborough instead, to be called the Watlington and Princes Risborough Railway. It was mostly funded by the rich landowners of Watlington. The act of Parliament, the Watlington and Princes Risborough Railway Act 1869 (32 & 33 Vict. c. cxliii), to build the line received royal assent on 26 July 1869 and it was opened in 1872, though not without some problems along the way.

By 1948, competition from road vehicles had led to a decline in rail usage across the UK. The nationalisation of the British railway network put the line under review of its future. In 1957 passenger services ceased but the line remained open for goods traffic until 30 December 1960, after which track on the southern part of the branch was lifted. However, a large cement works kept a 2.8 mi (4.5 km) stretch of the northern end of the line between Chinnor and Risborough junction open until 1989. After closure, this line was taken over by the Chinnor and Princes Risborough Railway and is now a heritage railway.

== Origins ==
Watlington suffered in the early part of the nineteenth century from poor road communications, at a time when transport and trade were becoming important, and other settlements were flourishing. The road network was very poor:

Watlington is a small town, the streets of which are narrow, and the houses, with a few exceptions, mean and ill-built. The nearest navigable stream is at the distance of 6 miles; a circumstance fatally adverse to the prosperity of the place. Here is no staple manufacture of any consequence... In addition to the remoteness of water-conveyance, the badness of the neighbouring roads, which are perhaps the worst in the county, acts prejudicially on commercial speculation.

According to the 1851 census, the population of Watlington then was 1,884.

As the 19th century progressed, it became increasingly obvious that good communications were essential for economic and commercial prosperity, and a railway was a key part of that.

The first railway scheme involving Watlington was put forward about 1861, for a line from the Great Western Railway at Cholsey, through Wallingford, Benson, Watlington and Chinnor to Princes Risborough. However, the complete plan was not adopted, instead the more modest proposal to build a line from Cholsey to Wallingford was put to Parliament in 1863; but it was withdrawn by its promoters. A new bill was resubmitted at the end of 1863 for the next parliamentary session, now including Cholsey to Wallingford and Watlington. The line, called the Wallingford and Watlington Railway, was authorised by the Wallingford and Watlington Railway Act 1864 (27 & 28 Vict. c. cclxvi) on 25 July 1864 with capital of £80,000. Getting the subscriptions to pay for the construction proved to be difficult, partly due to the difficult economic situation of the country at the time, but a contract was let for line from the GWR main line to Wallingford in the Spring of 1865.

The Wallingford railway branch line opened without public ceremony on 2 July 1866. Following the opening the board met to consider the next step of extending the line to Benson (at the time frequently referred to as Bensington), but it was obvious that money could not be raised to carry out any such work. Only £17,575 of the £80,000 capital for the line had ever been paid up, and the financial market was extremely difficult following the collapse of Overend, Gurney and Company. When it became known that a bill was to be presented to Parliament for a line from Princes Risborough to Watlington, it was clear that the Wallingford and Watlington Railway was not going to build any more of their line.

== Watlington and Princes Risborough ==
Watlington and Princes Risborough Railway Act 1869
- Act of Parliament
- Parliament of the United Kingdom
- Long title: An Act for making a Railway from Princes Risborough in the county of Buckingham to Watlington in the county of Oxford; and for other purposes.
- Citation: 32 & 33 Vict. c. cxliii

Dates
- Royal assent: 26 July 1869

Text of statute as originally enacted

The rival proposal was announced on 12 May 1868: a railway branch line was to link Watlington with Princes Risborough, on the former Wycombe Railway, now taken over by the Great Western Railway. Princes Risborough was a junction for the main line to Oxford via Thame, and a branch to Aylesbury. Events moved swiftly and the Watlington and Princes Risborough Railway Act 1869 (32 & 33 Vict. c. cxliii) authorising the Watlington and Princes Risborough Railway received royal assent on 26 July 1869.

The railway hereinbefore referred to and authorized by this Act is,—

- A railway (being the railway shown on the deposited plans and sections as railway No. 3) eight miles and four and three quarters chains in length, commencing in the parish of Princes Risborough in the county of Buckingham by a junction with the Wycombe Railway (Thame Extension) of the Great Western Railway Company, and terminating in the parish of Pyrton in the county of Oxford near the town of Watlington.

— Section 5, Watlington and Princes Risborough Railway Act 1869 (32 & 33 Vict. c. cxliii)

It was to be a 4 ft 8 1/2 in (1,435 mm) standard gauge line 8 1/2 miles (13.7 km) in length, and the authorised capital was £36,000; the estimated cost of construction was £33,889. The prime mover in getting the scheme implemented was the Earl of Macclesfield, whose seat was near Watlington, and the chairman of the company was Thomas Taylor, an exceedingly wealthy Lancashire cotton manufacturer now living locally. In fact only £8,000 of the company's capital was subscribed by other individuals.

At this time the Wycombe Railway was a 7 ft 1/4 in (2,140 mm) broad gauge single line; the Watlington line would form a junction with it three-quarters of one mile (1.2 km) west of Princes Risborough, and the section from the junction to the station would be made mixed gauge. However, the Wycombe Railway was converted to standard (4 ft 8 1/2 in or 1,435 mm) gauge by the time of construction of the Watlington line, so that mixed gauge was unnecessary.

In fact during construction, in March 1872, the GWR decided to run the Watlington line in to Princes Risborough alongside the Thame line, so that there were to be two single lines. When the Watlington Company considered that their railway construction was complete, they arranged for Colonel Rich of the Board of Trade to visit to make an inspection, in order to obtain the necessary approval for opening for passenger traffic. At that time the GWR had not formed the junction at the point of convergence of the Watlington line, nor the second single track. The Watlington line evidently terminated without a junction or station. As well as finding a number of detail matters unsatisfactory, Rich reported

"that the line should be continued from the point 3/4 mile (1.2 km) north of Princes Risborough station to the station. At present there is no terminus at the station [actually the end of the Watlington line] to deposit the passengers at." Rich also reminded the directors that an undertaking as to the method of working the single line was required.

On 16 June 1872, the engine shed at Watlington (of course not yet in use) caught fire, causing considerable damage. The local fire engine had just been acquired and dealing with the fire was its first duty.

Apparently not comprehending the objection to the blank end of their line approaching Princes Risborough, the directors arranged for a second visit from Col Rich, and this took place on 11 July 1872. The connecting line at Princes Risborough had still not been made and once again he declined to recommend the line for opening. The company had also indicated the type of engine they expected to use on the line, to be hired in from the GWR. It was a "517" class 0-4-2ST. He considered that this was a heavy class of locomotive considering the very light character of the permanent way, which would, he considered, lead to serious maintenance difficulties. The undertaking regarding the method of working had still not been submitted, and also the GWR had not connected the Princes Risborough section of its own line, so Rich again refused permission to open.

== Stations ==
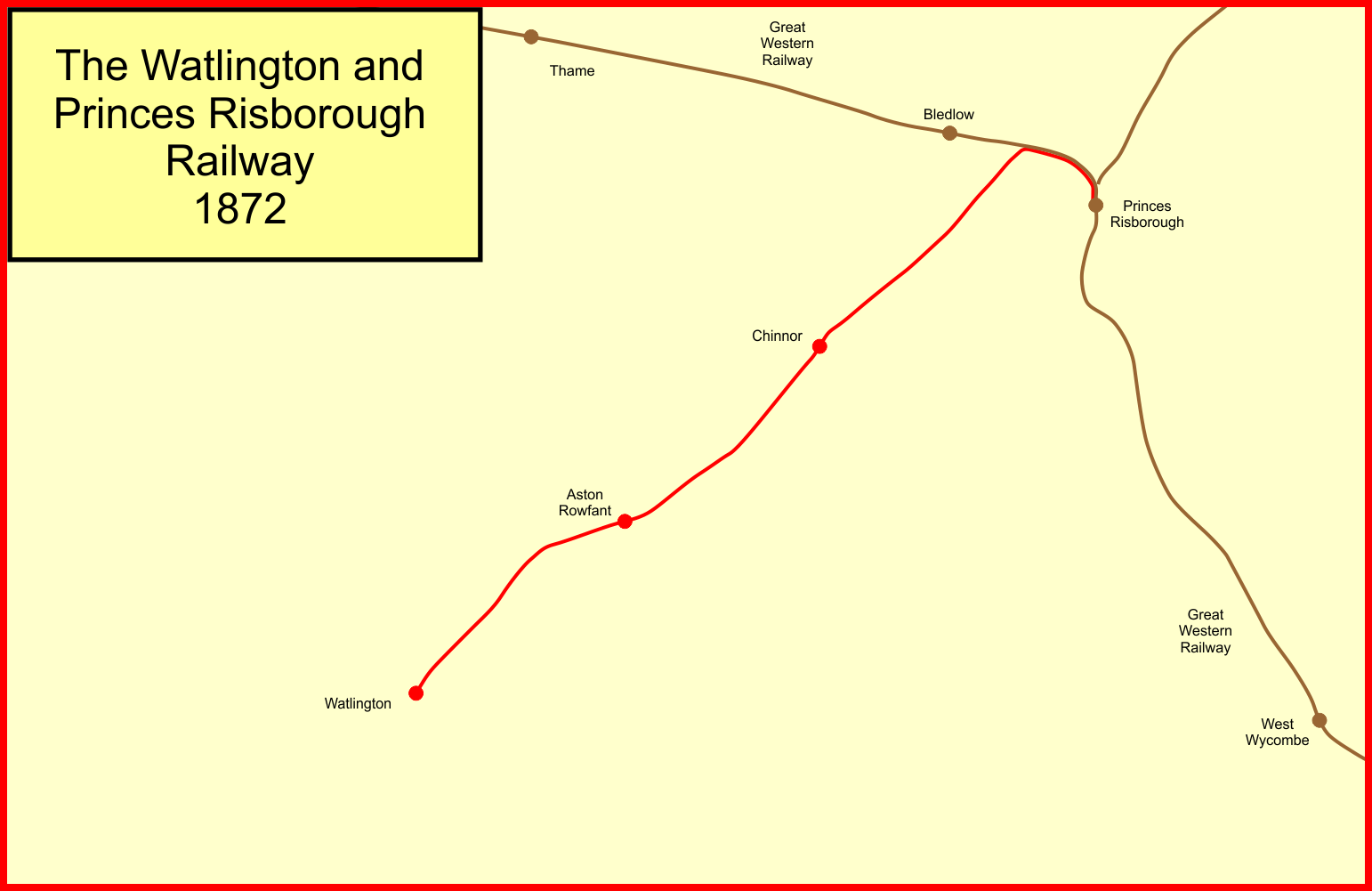
The Watlington and Princes Risborough Railway in 1872

The trackwork was finally completed, but further delay ensued while the directors failed to provide the undertaking of method of working; when they finally did so on 14 August, stating that the train staff and ticket system would be used, the Board of Trade gave its sanction. The line opened on 15 August 1872.

The stations were at Princes Risborough, Chinnor, Aston Rowant and Watlington. The Princes Risborough station was a short wooden platform adjacent to, but separate from the GWR station. (Note: Christiansen is in error (page 150) when he states that "six intermediate stations and halts" opened in 1872.)

- Watlington;
- Lewknor Bridge Halt; opened 1 September 1906;
- Aston Rowant;
- Kingston Crossing Halt; opened 1 September 1906;
- Chinnor;
- Wainhill Crossing Halt; opened 1 August 1925;
- Bledlow Bridge Halt; opened 1 September 1906;
- Princes Risborough; main line junction station.

The construction of the line employed minimal earthworks to keep cost down; after descending at 1 in 107 leaving Princes Risborough the line climbed at gradients up to 1 in 68 to reach Chinnor; the line then continued undulating to Aston Rowant with short up and down gradients, then falling at up to 1 in 78 to the Watlington terminus.

== Financial difficulties ==
From the outset working expenses exceeded receipts; to the end of 1872 expenditure was £789 and receipts came to £665. (Note: Figures quoted in Karau; but immediately afterwards he says that Bradshaw’s Shareholders Manual tended towards optimism, saying receipts have been sufficient, and quoting the £124 loss as a £124 surplus, and that "so far the company has been able to discharge the GW account for loco hire etc." This must be a mistake.) The company also included the £3,000 retention money (Note: A proportion of the contractor's bill retained until the initial maintenance period has expired.) as an asset, whereas it was a liability! £12,000 in debenture loans had been taken to finance the construction.

At a shareholders' meeting on 20 October 1873, the Board announced that "We are sorry to add that ... the expenditure [exceeds] income by a considerable sum." Inevitably there was no dividend. There was an account with the GWR for the toll for using its section of line and the station at Princes Risborough, and for locomotive hire; the account remained unpaid and mounted, and repeated requests for payment by the GWR were ignored. The financial situation was desperate.

It is likely that the GWR presented an ultimatum regarding engine power, for in September 1875 the Watlington company took delivery of a second hand 2-2-2WT locomotive, originally built by Sharp, Stewart and Company in 1857 for the Furness Railway; the price was £900. This was money the Company did not have, and the locomotive and some rolling stock were acquired by a nominally independent company, the Watlington Rolling Stock Company, formed in 1875. (Note: This is an eighteenth century rolling stock company, a ROSCO, familiar in the twenty-first century British railway scene.) The penniless Watlington Railway was its only customer, so it is difficult to see how it could survive. (The locomotive was extremely unsuitable for use on the line quite apart from its poor mechanical condition, and a second engine was later procured.)

At a Shareholders' Meeting on 5 December 1874, it was stated that there had been circulated a "report that the line would probably soon be closed, whereas we are glad to say that those present, who represented nearly nine-tenths of the capital subscribed, agreed unanimously to assist in removing the present supposed difficulties, and in working the line on a more advantageous plan, so as to prevent any embarrassments that may arise."

Taylor was of course the dominant shareholder, and this misleading account must have been for the consumption of creditors.

The train service had consisted of three mixed trains each way daily, but from early 1875 the "advantageous plan" was implemented. An additional early and late train were put on to connect with the first Up London train and the last Down. In addition two round trips on Sundays were added. These trains did not get much support and were withdrawn in the summer.

The way out seemed to be to persuade the Great Western Railway to take the line on, and Thomas Taylor wrote to the GWR Chairman on 24 April 1875, offering to lease the line to the GWR for £600 a year "in liquidation of the amount now owing by our company". Taylor claimed that the line was now "about paying its way" but in fact the year's income was £850 and expenditure £1,405.

At the end of 1875, an agreement was reached with the GWR to use their station at Princes Risborough for five years, for a charge of £250.

== GWR takeover ==
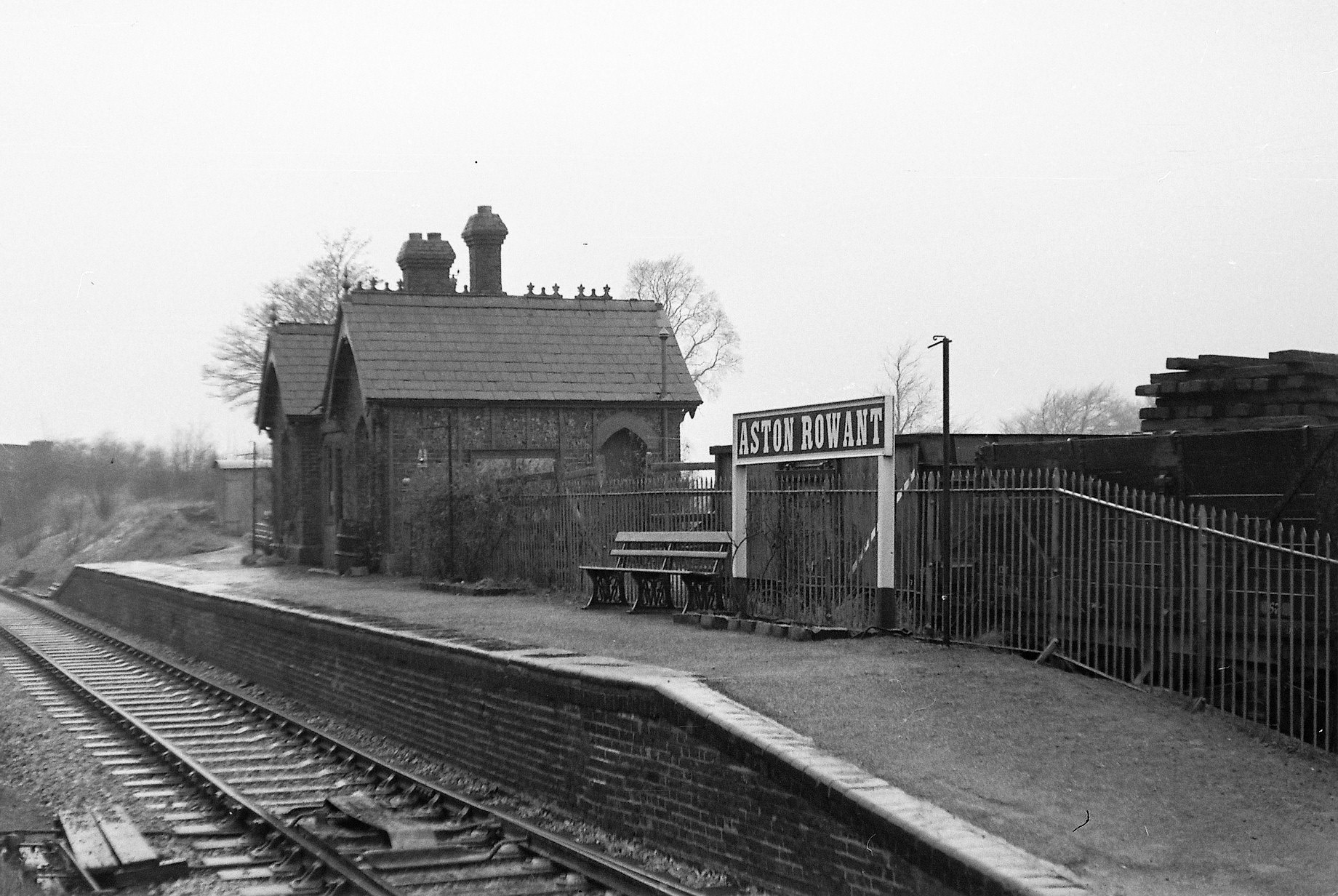
Aston Rowant station in 1959

On 31 December 1881, the agreement for the use of the GWR line and Princes Risborough station expired and it was necessary to negotiate a new agreement. The Watlington Railway again raised the issue of a lease by GWR. It was readily apparent that the railway was unable to pay the historic debt and any negotiation over future terms was futile, so the GWR took advantage of things and an arrangement for takeover was settled.

At the shareholders’ meeting of the Watlington Company on 16 June 1883, Taylor put the proposal to the meeting, and it emerged that he had failed to carry other shareholders with him in the scheme, although he was by far the majority shareholder. In a tense and heated debate, others criticised the proposal, suggesting that the financial situation might improve, and that debts due to the rolling stock company might be deferred. The GWR offer was £23,000; the line had cost £46,500 to build.

More contentious argument followed, but eventually the sale was agreed and liquidation of the company took place, with Taylor himself being appointed liquidator. The rolling stock company was also liquidated as part of the process. The transfer was effective on 31 December 1883 (although practical control had been assumed from 1 June). For reasons of his own, Taylor was obstructive over handing over the company's minute and accounting books to the GWR, and a lengthy and unhelpful correspondence on the matter followed.

The GWR inspected the assets of its new railway and found that the rolling stock was extremely dilapidated; the assessment also considered the track. It was reported on 14 November 1883 that even after the immediate expenditure of £3,750 to get the line in order, a further £7,010 was necessary on track work even to continue to run the light rolling stock on the line; £9,827 would be necessary if it was to be made good enough for ordinary GWR stock.

At this period, the train service consisted of three return mixed trains daily, although there were complaints that the first train out and the last train home (9.00 am and 6.30 pm respectively) were inconvenient for business journeys to London.

The Regulation of Railways Act 1889 required the installation of the block telegraph for lines worked by train staff and ticket. (Note: The block telegraph was a safety measure, used to prevent a second train entering a section of line until the preceding train was known to have exited.) With such a limited train service, the company was only operating one train at a time on the line, so it reduced the operating system to one engine in steam to avoid the £355 cost of the block telegraph.

In October 1891, a scheme was put forward by local promoters to build a railway link between Watlington and Wallingford, a revival of the unbuilt section of the Wallingford and Watlington Railway. The capital cost would be £50,000, and with considerable boldness the promoters asked the GWR to guarantee a 3% dividend on that sum. With a heavily loss-making branch on their hands with access to London, it was evident that a line only connecting two small towns would fare badly, and the GWR declined.

In the final years of the nineteenth century, an ambitious scheme was finalised that resulted in the GWR and the Great Central Railway (GCR) jointly building a new main line northward from Princes Risborough, as well as improving the former Wycombe Railway line south of that place. This became the Great Western and Great Central Joint Railway, which took over the line between Wycombe and Princes Risborough on 1 August 1899. As well as building northwards, a contract for doubling the Wycombe line and rebuilding Princes Risborough station was awarded to a contractor on 24 July 1902. The joint line was fully opened on 20 November 1905, bringing considerably more passenger trains to Princes Risborough station, which was much enlarged as part of the work. The Aylesbury branch was transferred to the Joint Company, but the Watlington line and the Thame and Oxford line remained wholly with the GWR.

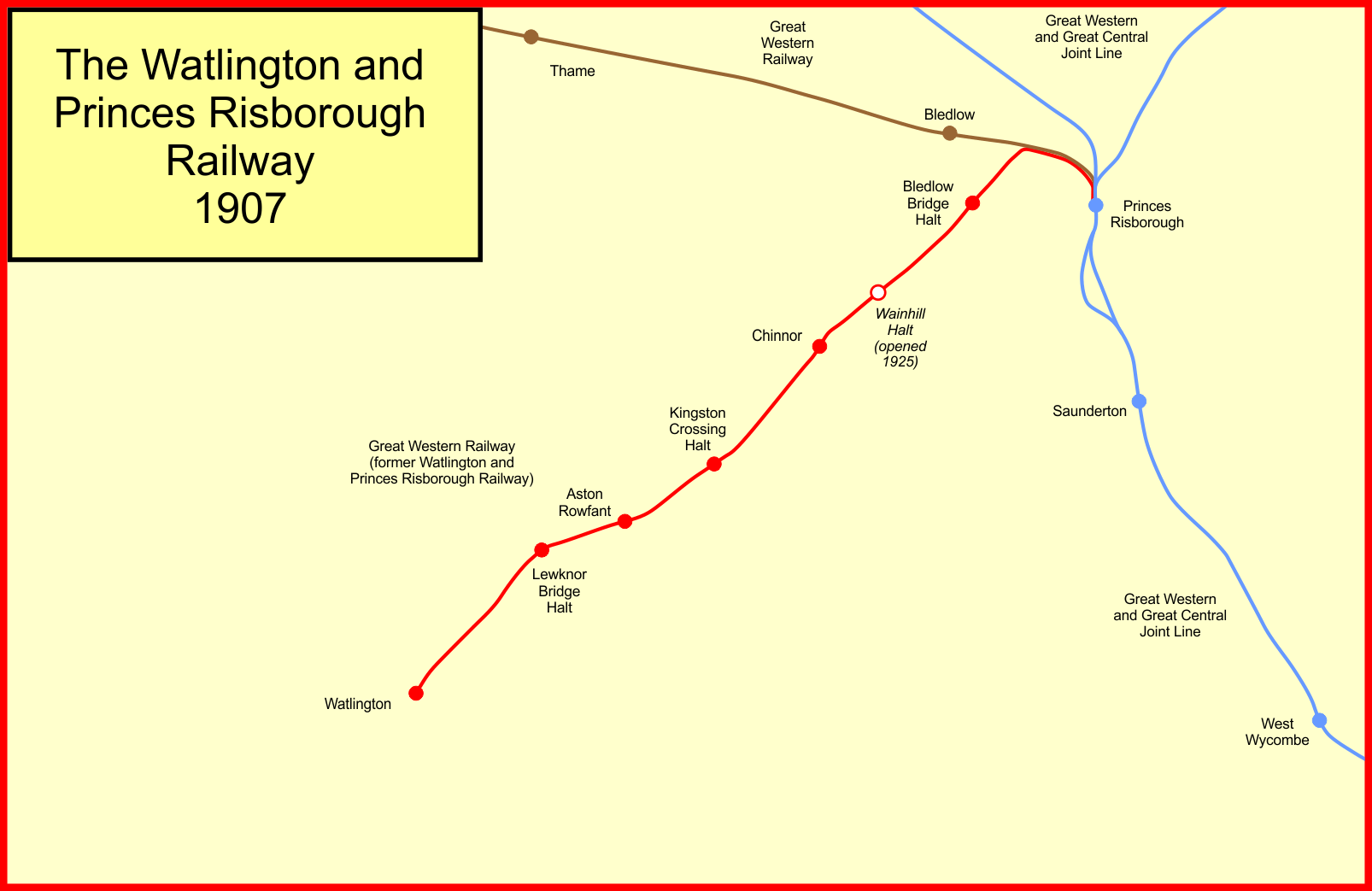
The Watlington branch in 1907

From May 1900, an additional round trip was made on the branch, making four journeys a day. Attention was given by the GWR throughout its system to the need for more frequent local passenger trains, calling at an increased number of stopping places, while reducing operating costs. This led to the widespread implementation of motor trains and auto trains, and station halts with minimal facilities.

Railmotor trains were introduced from 1 September 1906, and these were superseded by auto-trains. (Note: It is emphasised that the terms had more than one interpretation: "railmotor" sometimes referred to a passenger carriage with an integrated steam power unit; "auto-train" usually referred to a small conventional steam engine operating one or two passenger coaches; to avoid running the engine round the train at the ends of journeys, the engine could propel (push) the coach, and special apparatus enabled the driver to control the locomotive from a driving compartment in the coach. The arrangement is often referred to as "pull-and-push" or sometimes "push-and-pull". Maggs states that motor trains were introduced in 1906 and were superseded by auto-trains, implying a change to the different type. However, Karau and Turner give (page 216) locomotive allocations at Watlington for the period, and none of the integrated railmotor type is shown. On page 43, they say "We have not discovered any evidence that steam railmotors were used on the line... Nor is there any evidence that auto-working was employed. Auto-trailers were simply provided to serve new low-level halts [because of the power-operated steps on the trailers]." Power-operated retractable steps were provided to enable passengers to board and alight at low platforms at places with minimal facilities; halts with rail level platforms were opened at Lewknor, Kingston Level Crossing and Bledlow Bridge.)

A local newspaper either drew attention to a railway mistake, or made the mistake itself:

G. W. Railway: The new halting place on the Risborough to Watlington branch was opened on Saturday last, and will be a great convenience... The car is comfortable, commodious, and well lighted. It is a pity, however, that a better name than "Bledlow Ridge" could not have been found for the halt, as it is quite two miles distant from that place... We would suggest, to save confusion, that the halt be renamed "Bledlow Bridge".

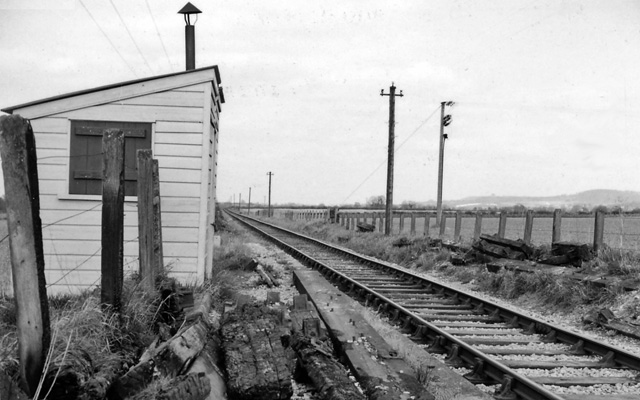
Bledlow Bridge Halt

The timber-built locomotive shed at Watlington caught fire and was destroyed in September 1906.

Chinnor Lime Works was established in 1908 and started the production of cement from 1919. The manufacture increased over the years and was acquired by Rugby Portland Cement in 1963. Operation ceased in 2000.

A new halt called Wainhill Crossing halt was opened on 1 August 1925.

== Nationalisation and demise ==
After nationalisation in 1948, the last train of the day from Princes Risborough connected out of a slip coach at Princes Risborough; the slip coach was slipped from the 7.10 pm Paddington to Birmingham express train. (Note: Christiansen says that the slip coach was taken on to Watlington by the local train, but this is a mistake; the slip coach continued to Banbury, and was never run on the Watlington branch. In Bradshaw's Guide December 1955, for example, the connection was on Fridays and Saturdays only and was marked "by slip carriage to Princes Risborough".)

From 5 to 7 March 1951, passenger services on the line were suspended, and buses run to cover. This was because a fireman, A V Benham, was granted 12 days leave to get married, and no cover was available; the service resumed running on 8 March when a driver volunteered as a substitute.

The development of motor buses and lorries, coupled with the improvement in the road network in the 1920s onward brought about a serious and continuing decline in the traffic on the line, and following the formation of British Railways in 1948, a review took place of branch lines which did not justify continued support. On 19 June 1951, local newspapers carried announcements of the intended closure of passenger service.

In fact the process of authorising withdrawal had become politicised and several years passed before the intention was carried into effect; however, the passenger service was closed down from 1 July 1957, the last train having run on 29 June. Chinnor, Aston Rowant and Watlington stations remained open for goods and parcels, but the line beyond Chinnor closed completely after the last train on 30 December 1960. The public goods facility at Chinnor closed on 10 October 1966, and only the private siding traffic to the cement works continued after that; the branch was operated as a "long siding". Chinnor lime works had started production in 1908 and from 1963 the plant was run by Rugby Portland Cement Co Ltd. The last revenue earning rail journey occurred on 20 December 1989. The lime works ceased operation in 2000.

== Preservation ==
When commercial operation on the line ended in 1989, a volunteer group called the Chinnor and Princes Risborough Railway Association was formed to preserve the line by retaining the route and acquiring period rolling stock.

The Chinnor and Princes Risborough Railway was subsequently formed, and the remaining route reopened as a heritage railway. The C&PRR aims to reopen the line as far as Aston Rowant.
