= Shabbington =

Village in Buckinghamshire, England

Coordinates: 51.757°N 1.036°W

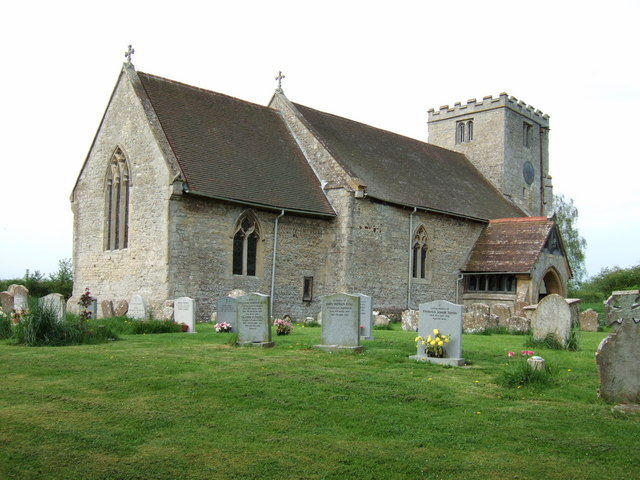
- St. Mary Magdalene Parish Church

- Location within Buckinghamshire
- Population: 486 (2011)
- OS grid reference: SP665075
- Civil parish: Shabbington
- Unitary authority: Buckinghamshire
- Ceremonial county: Buckinghamshire
- Region: South East
- Country: England
- Sovereign state: United Kingdom
- Post town: AYLESBURY
- Postcode district: HP18
- Dialling code: 01844
- Police: Thames Valley
- Fire: Buckinghamshire
- Ambulance: South Central
- UK Parliament: Mid Buckinghamshire
- Website: Shabbington parish council

Shabbington is a village and civil parish in west Buckinghamshire, England, about 3 miles (5 km) west of Thame in neighbouring Oxfordshire, and 7 miles (11 km) southwest of Aylesbury.

The village is close to the River Thame, which forms much of the southern boundary of the parish and also part of the county boundary with Oxfordshire. The parish has an area of 2,152 acres (871 ha).

== Toponym ==
The toponym is derived from the Old English for "Scobba's farm". It appears as Sobintone in Domesday Book of 1086 and again in a record from the 14th century. It is spelt Shobindon in records from the 15th and 16th centuries. Until the Victorian era it was alternatively spelt Shobington; it was at about this time that the name changed to its current spelling.

== Manor ==
In the reign of Edward the Confessor a Saxon thegn, Wigod of Wallingford, held the manor of Shabbington. In the Norman Conquest of England, Wigod supported the invader William of Normandy and afterwards Wigod gave his daughter Ealdgyth in marriage to the Norman baron Robert D'Oyly, who had Wallingford Castle built. Ealdgyth bore D'Oyly no male heir so the D'Oyly estates passed to their daughter Maud or Matilda, and then to her first husband Miles Crispin, who may have been the first castellan of Wallingford Castle. Shabbington remained part of the Honour of Wallingford until the 16th century, when the Wallingford estates became part of the Honour of Ewelme.

After the Norman conquest, Shabbington Manor represented two knight's fees. The tenancy was held by the Valognes family until 1299 when Joan de Valognes, widow of Robert de Grey, alienated the manor in free alms to the Knights Hospitaller of St. John of Jerusalem. Joan held the manor until her death in 1312, but in 1326–29 her grandson and heir John de Grey disputed the Hospitallers' tenure and successfully reclaimed the manor. John de Grey died in 1359 leaving Shabbington to his son John de Grey, 2nd Baron Grey de Rotherfield, to whom the Hospitallers surrendered their claim in 1360. Robert de Grey, 4th Baron Grey de Rotherfield died in 1388 with no male heir, so when his daughter Joan married John, Lord Deyncourt in 1401, Shabbington joined his estate of Wooburn Deyncourt.

In 1466 Shabbington was settled on Sir William Lovel, 7th Baron Morley, who in 1474 released the manor to feoffees including Richard Piggott, who in turn transferred it to other feoffees, of whom the principal was Richard Fowler. Fowler died in 1477; also Richard, was knighted in 1501 and sold Shabbington in 1515–18.

The buyer was John Clerke, who was later knighted and died in about 1540. In 1660 a later John Clerke was made the first Clerke Baronet, of Hitcham, but made Shabbington the main seat of his baronetcy. The manor descended with the baronetcy until Sir John Clerke, 4th Baronet sold Shabbington in 1716.

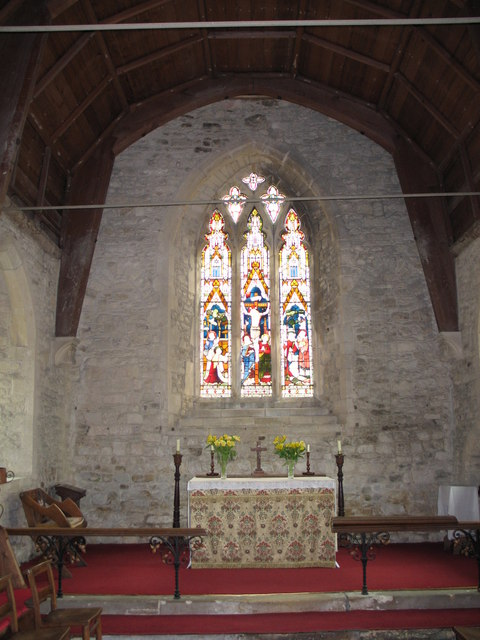
St. Mary Magdalene parish church: east end of the 11th century chancel, with 13th century Decorated Gothic east window and 19th century stained glass.

The buyer was Francis Heywood, whose son William died in 1762. William's two sisters and their nephew John Crewe inherited the manor in 1763. Crewe became sole owner in 1788, succeeded by his widow Elizabeth, who in turn left Shabbington to their son-in-law George Boscawen, 3rd Viscount Falmouth. When the Viscount died in 1808, his Shabbington estate was sold in lots.

William Beasley bought the manor and 446 acres (180 ha) in 1815 and sold them in 1827 to Sir Edward Blount, 8th Baronet, of Sodington, Worcestershire. Shabbington then descended to the 9th and 10th Baronets, and was still in the Blount family in the 1920s.

== Parish church ==
The nave and chancel of the Church of England parish church of Saint Mary Magdalene are 11th century. The chancel windows are the 13th century and the Perpendicular Gothic bell-tower is later medieval. The pulpit is Jacobean and was made in 1626. The present nave windows are Victorian Gothic Revival additions. St. Mary Magdalene's is a Grade II* listed building.

The tower has a ring of six bells. All except the treble bell were cast in 1718 by Abraham I Rudhall of Gloucester. Mears and Stainbank of the Whitechapel Bell Foundry cast the treble bell in 1881. There is also a Sanctus bell cast by Thomas I Mears of Whitechapel in 1794.

The parish registers date from 1714. St. Mary Magdalene is now part of the Benefice of Worminghall with Ickford, Oakley and Shabbington.

== School ==
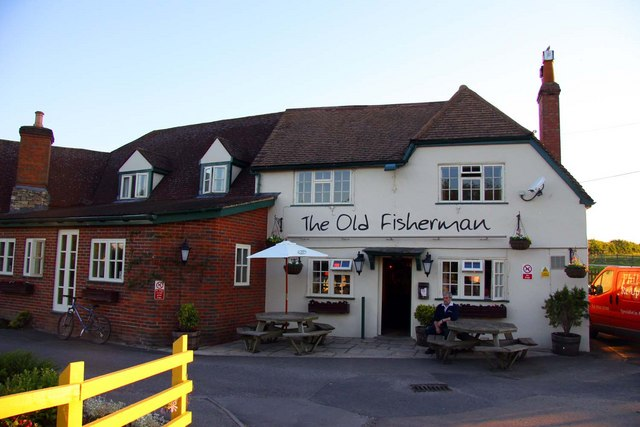
The Old Fisherman pub and restaurant

The former school room and master's house are now two private homes. The oldest part is timber framed and was built in the 17th century. In the 18th century the three-bay west range was added as the schoolmaster's accommodation and a gothic east window was inserted in the older part of the building. A new schoolroom was added in about 1850.

== Amenities ==
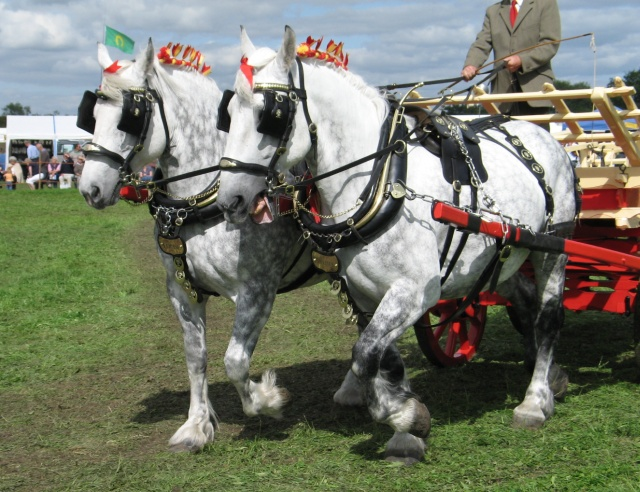
A pair of draught horses at the Steam and Country Fair in August 2009

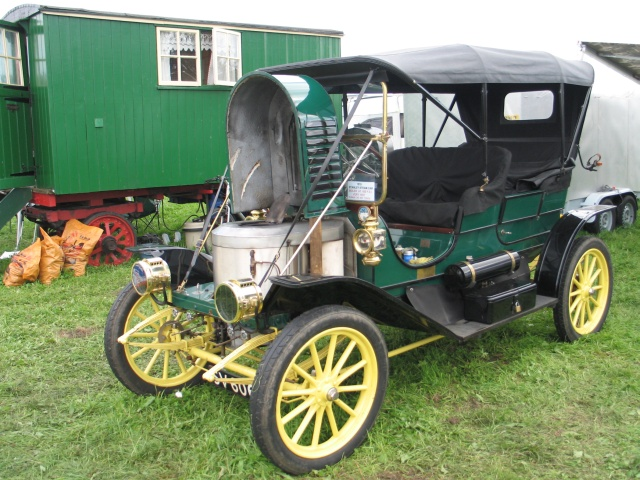
Stanley steam-powered car at the Steam and Country Fair in August 2009

Shabbington has a public house, The Old Fisherman, that is also a restaurant.

The Great Bucks Steam and Country Fair is held at Shabbington each summer in early August. The first fair was in 1982 and since then it has been called off three times, once because of heavy rain; another time because of foot and mouth; and lastly due to the COVID-19 pandemic in 2020.

In 2011 there were 21 working steam engines as well as fire engines, motorbikes and vintage cars. 8,000 steam engine and vintage car enthusiasts came to Shabbington for the fair. The chairman Maria Millan said: "A lot of people travel quite far to get here and like it because it has a local feel and is organised by a family and a few friends."

== Sources and further reading ==
- Page, W.H., ed. (1927). A History of the County of Buckingham, Volume 4. Victoria County History. pp. 102–104.
- Pevsner, Nikolaus (1960). Buckinghamshire. The Buildings of England. Harmondsworth: Penguin Books. p. 232. ISBN 0-14-071019-1.
- Reed, Michael (1979). Hoskins, W.G.; Millward, Roy (eds.). The Buckinghamshire Landscape. The Making of the English Landscape. London: Hodder & Stoughton. p. 251. ISBN 0-340-19044-2.
