= Aston Rowant =

Village in Oxfordshire, England

Coordinates: 51.687°N 0.950°W

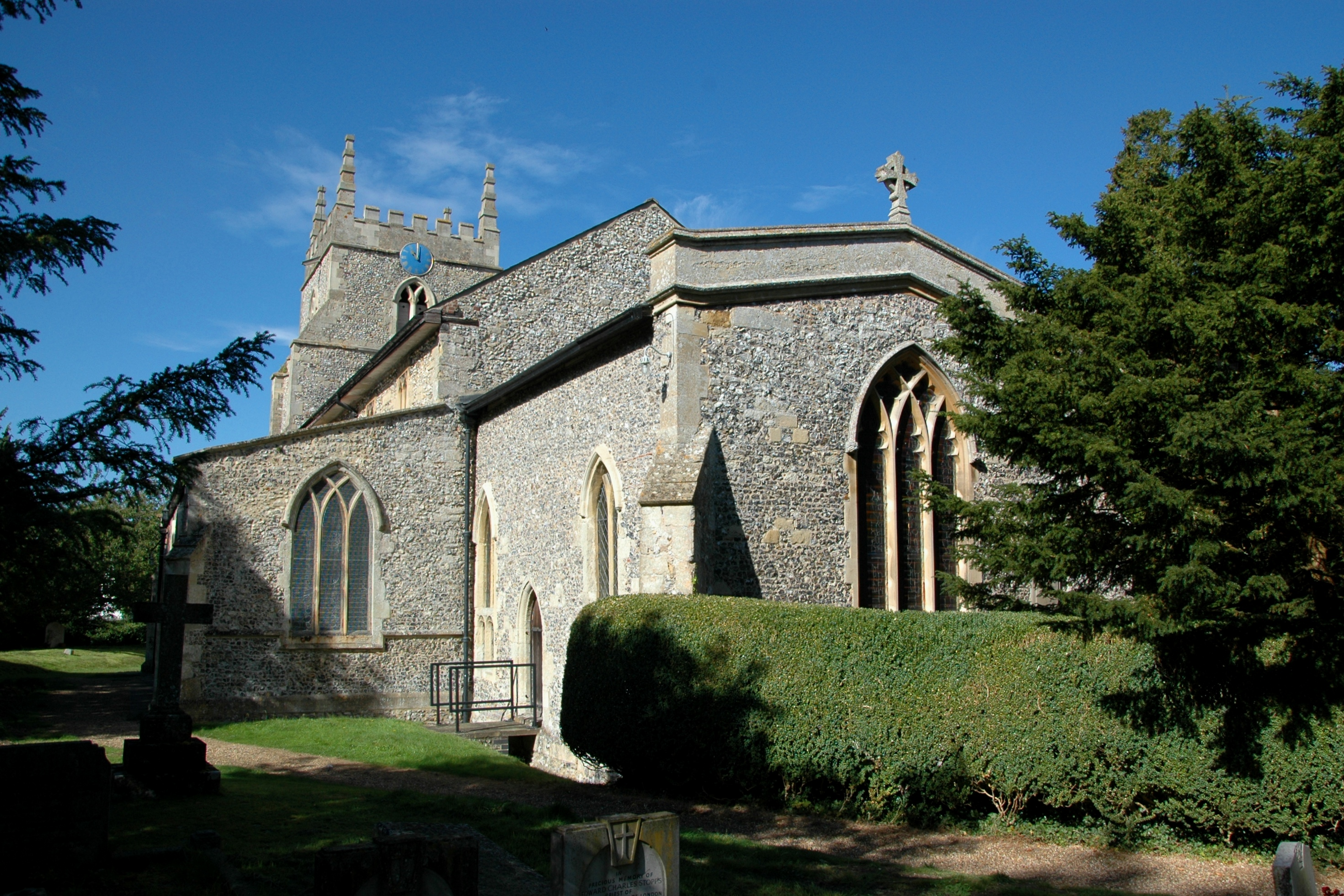
- SS Peter and Paul parish church

- Location within Oxfordshire
- Area: 11.82 km^{2} (4.56 sq mi)
- Population: 793 (parish, including Kingston Blount) (2011 census)
  - Density: 67/km^{2} (170/sq mi)
- OS grid reference: SU7299
- Civil parish: Aston Rowant
- District: South Oxfordshire
- Shire county: Oxfordshire
- Region: South East
- Country: England
- Sovereign state: United Kingdom
- Post town: Watlington
- Postcode district: OX49
- Dialling code: 01844
- Police: Thames Valley
- Fire: Oxfordshire
- Ambulance: South Central
- UK Parliament: Henley and Thame
- Website: Aston Rowant Parish Council

Aston Rowant (anciently Aston Rohant) is a village, civil parish and former manor about 4 1/2 miles (7 km) south of Thame in South Oxfordshire, England. The parish includes the villages of Aston Rowant and Kingston Blount, and adjoins Buckinghamshire to the southeast. The 2011 census recorded the parish's population as 793. The Lower Icknield Way passes through the parish southeast of the village.

== Archaeology ==
Toward the end of the 17th century a large Roman vessel, containing five smaller ones, was found at Kingston Blount. In 1971 a hoard of late seventh- and early eighth-century silver coins called sceattas was found on the Chiltern escarpment, near where the A40 road crosses the Icknield Way. In 1972 the hoard was reported to total 175 coins, by 1994 the total was 350, and either case it was then the largest single find of sceattas in Britain. A Coroner's Court determined that the coins are treasure trove, and the British Museum then acquired the hoard.

The hoard is believed to have been hidden in either AD 710 or 710–15. Only about a quarter of the coins were from Anglo-Saxon mints in Britain. The remainder are from mainland Europe, mostly from Merovingian mints around the mouth of the Rhine. The owner may therefore have been a Frisian merchant travelling along the Icknield Way.

== Manor ==
In 1055 the Diocese of Winchester held the manor of Aston. Bishop Stigand of Winchester had promised to grant Aston to the Benedictine Abingdon Abbey but failed to do so. Just before the Norman Conquest of England a Saxon called Wulfstan held the manor.

The Domesday Book records that in 1086 Aston belonged to Miles Crispin, son-in-law of Robert D'Oyly. Crispin died in 1107 and his widow Maud was married to Brien FitzCount. FitzCount and Maud supported the Empress Matilda during the Anarchy, and when King Stephen defeated Matilda both FitzCount and Maud entered religious houses, the latter to Wallingford Priory to whom the grant of the church (glebe and advowson) was made, subsequently appointing its vicar until the dissolution of the monasteries. Stephen granted their estates to Henry, Duke of Normandy, thus making Aston part of the Honour of Wallingford. Aston later became part of the Honour of Ewelme. It later was the seat of the de Rohant family from which the manor gained the name Aston Rohant, today corrupted to Aston Rowant. The heir of de Rohant was the Champernowne family, lords of the manor of Modbury in Devon.

== Parish church ==
The oldest parts of the Church of England parish church of Saint Peter and Saint Paul are the north and south walls of the nave, which are Norman and from around 1100. The chancel was rebuilt late in the 13th century in the Decorated Gothic style. The Decorated Gothic bell tower and north and south aisles were added in the 14th century. In the 15th century natural light in the church was increased by the addition of a window in the north wall and a clerestory above the nave, both of which are Perpendicular Gothic.

The church tower had a spire until 1811, when some of the stonework of the tower parapet fell off and the spire was removed during the tower repairs. In 1831 the Perpendicular Gothic roof of the nave was replaced with a new flat one. The chancel was renovated in 1850 and its present east window was inserted in 1856. In 1874 the north aisle was extended westwards by one bay to provide a chamber in which an organ was installed. The architect E.G. Bruton restored the building in 1884.

The tower has a ring of six bells. The oldest is the fourth bell, which Roger Landen of Wokingham, Berkshire cast in about 1450. Ellis I Knight of Reading cast the second, third and tenor bells in 1625. John Warner and Sons of Cripplegate, London cast the fifth bell in 1873 and the Whitechapel Bell Foundry cast the present treble bell in 1975, completing the current ring of six.

== Social and economic history ==
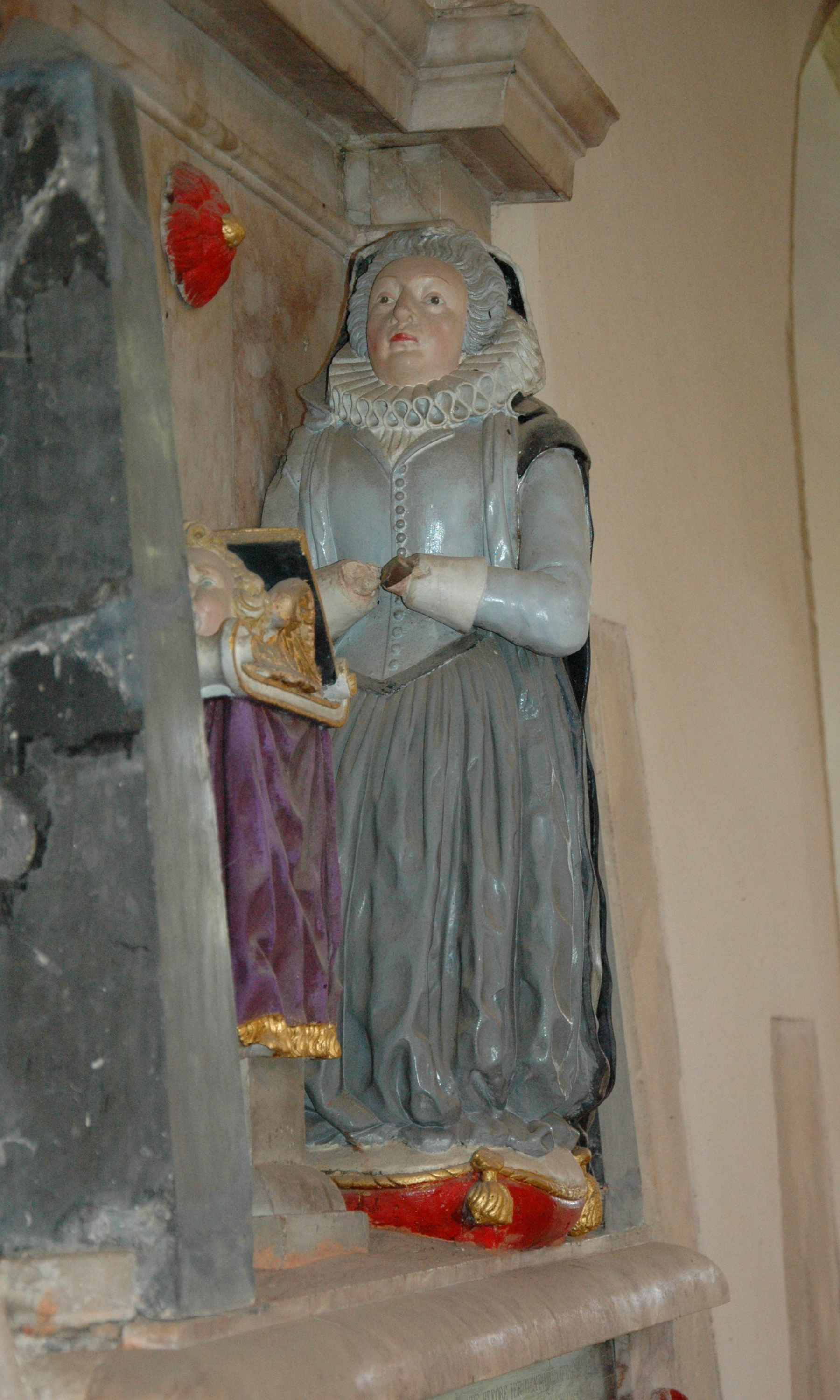
SS Peter and Paul parish church: detail of monument to Lady Cecil Hobbee, (died 1618), wife of Sir Edward Hobbee of Bisham, Berkshire

Aston Rowant was a large strip parish, more than double its current size, extending about 6 miles (10 km) from the southern edge of Thame Park in the northwest to Beacon's Bottom high in the Chilterns to the southeast. The 1841 census recorded a parish population greater than today, at 884 people. However the parish included Stokenchurch until 1844.

The village school was founded in or before 1833 as a National School for girls, and in 1844 its present premises were built and it became a mixed school. In 1931 it was reorganised as a junior school and in 1951 it became a Church of England school.

The single-track Watlington and Princes Risborough Railway was built in 1872 and opened Aston Rowant railway station about 1/2 mile (800 m) from the village. The Great Western Railway operated the line until nationalisation in 1948. British Railways withdrew passenger services in 1957 and closed Aston Rowant goods yard in 1961. The track has since been dismantled.

The railway station appears in four feature films:

- The Captive Heart (1946)
- My Brother Jonathan (1947)
- My Brother's Keeper (1948)
- Portrait of Clare (1950)

Excerpts of these films can be found at The Watlington Branch Line YouTube Playlist.

== Amenities ==
Aston Rowant Cricket Club plays in the Home Counties and Cherwell Leagues. Its ground covers a quarter of the gap between Aston Rowant and Kingston Blount (known as Kingston, locally) and serves both villages' cricketers. Kingston can be reached by direct path or road and has another sports ground next to its allotments. Aston Rowant National Nature Reserve, on the Chiltern escarpment, is partly in the parish.

== Notable people ==
- John Caillaud, (1726-1812) was Commander-in-Chief, India in 1760. He retired to and died in Aston Rowant in December, 1812.

== Sources ==
- Blair, John (1994). Anglo-Saxon Oxfordshire. Oxford and Stroud: Oxfordshire Books and Alan Sutton Publishing. pp. 81, 141. ISBN 978-0-7509-0147-5.
- Kent, JPC (1972). "The Aston Rowant Treasure Trove" (PDF). Oxoniensia. XXXVII. Oxford Architectural and Historical Society: 243–244.
- Lobel, Mary D, ed. (1964). A History of the County of Oxford. Victoria County History. Vol. 8: Lewknor and Pyrton Hundreds. London: Oxford University Press for the Institute of Historical Research. pp. 16–43.
- Page, WH, ed. (1925). A History of the County of Buckingham. Victoria County History. Vol. 3. London: The St Katherine Press. pp. 96–101.
- Sherwood, Jennifer; Pevsner, Nikolaus (1974). Oxfordshire. The Buildings of England. Harmondsworth: Penguin Books. pp. 426–427. ISBN 0-14-071045-0.
- Lewis, Samuel (1848). A Topographical Dictionary of England. London: Oxford University Press for the Institute of Historical Research. pp. 104–108.
