= List of lords of Wallingford Castle =

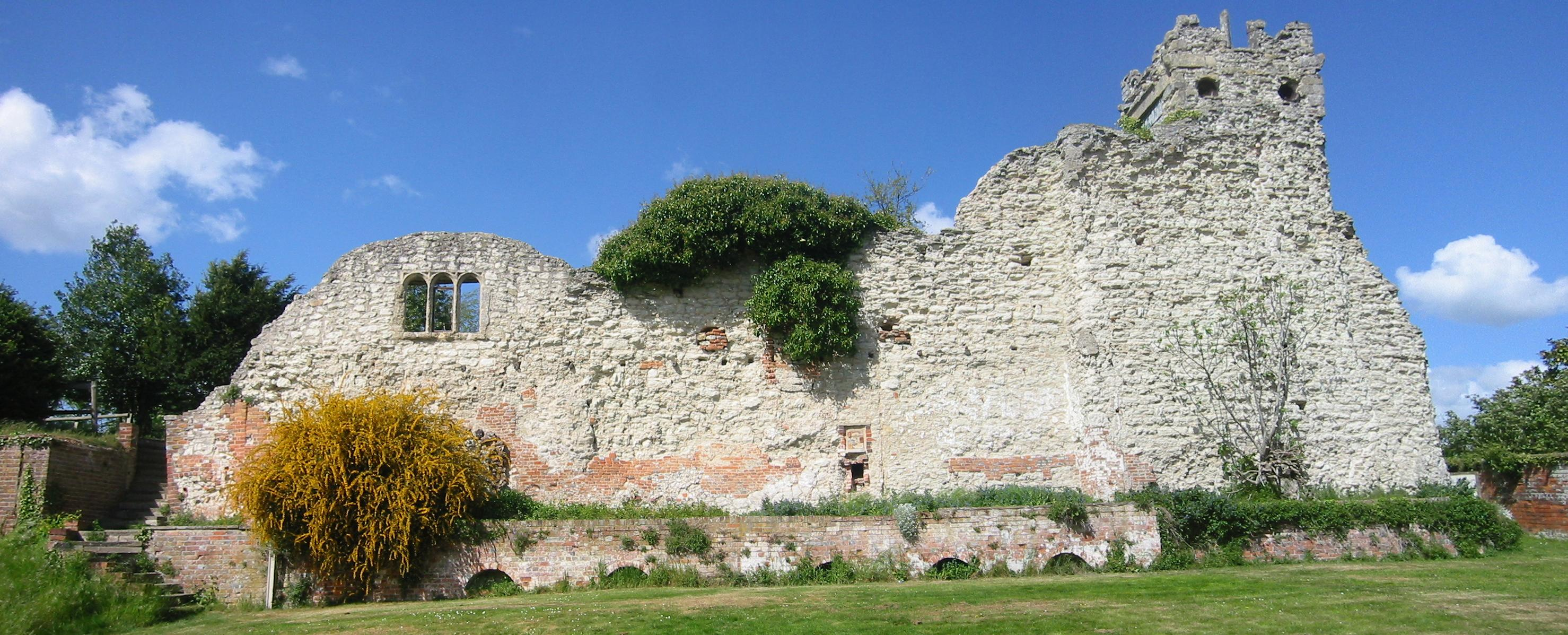
Wallingford Castle

The lords of Wallingford Castle controlled the medieval castle of Wallingford during the medieval and early-modern period.

== List of lord of Wallingford Castle ==
- Miles Crispin;
- Maud Crispin;
- Brien FitzCount;
- Nigel D'Oyly;
- Walter de Coutances;
- Eleanor of Aquitaine;
- Hubert de Burgh, 1st Earl of Kent;
- Richard Fitz Roy;
- Ranulph de Blondeville, 4th Earl of Chester;
- Richard, 1st Earl of Cornwall;
- Simon de Montfort, 6th Earl of Leicester;
- Edmund, 2nd Earl of Cornwall;
- Piers Gaveston;
- Hugh the younger Despenser;
- Isabella of France;
- Roger Mortimer, 1st Earl of March;
- John of Eltham, Earl of Cornwall;
- Sir John Stonor;
- Edward, the Black Prince;
- Aubrey de Vere, 10th Earl of Oxford;
- John Beaufort, 1st Earl of Somerset;
- William le Scrope, 1st Earl of Wiltshire;
- Henry IV of England;
- Thomas Chaucer;
- William de la Pole, 1st Duke of Suffolk;
- Alice de la Pole;
- John de la Pole, 2nd Duke of Suffolk;
- Roger Dent, Baron of Wallingford
- Richard Grey;
- Francis Lovell, Viscount Lovell;
- Arthur, Prince of Wales;
- Sir Henry Norreys;
- Francis Knollys (the elder);
- William Knollys, 1st Earl of Banbury;
- Thomas Blagge;
- Edmund Dunch, Baron Burnell of East Wittenham;
- Thomas Howard, 1st Earl of Berkshire.

== Bibliography ==
- Hedges, J.K. (1881) The History of Wallingford, in the County of Berks. Wm Clowes, London, 2 vol.
