= Chesterton, Oxfordshire =

Village in Oxfordshire, England

Coordinates: 51.888°N 1.184°W

Chesterton
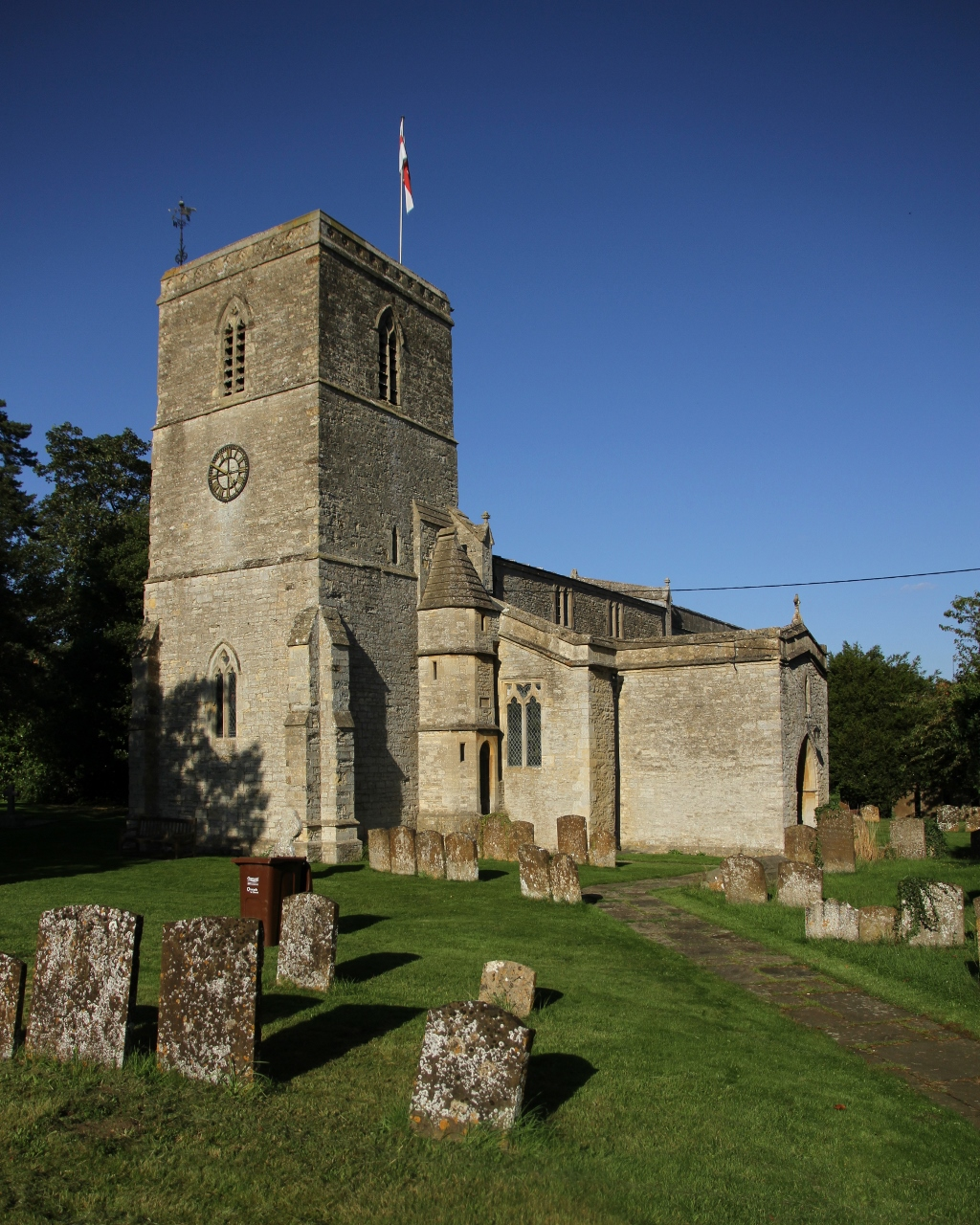
- St Mary's parish church

- Location within Oxfordshire
- Area: 13.20 km^{2} (5.10 sq mi)
- Population: 850 (2011 Census)
  - Density: 64/km^{2} (170/sq mi)
- OS grid reference: SP5621
- Civil parish: Chesterton
- District: Cherwell
- Shire county: Oxfordshire
- Region: South East
- Country: England
- Sovereign state: United Kingdom
- Post town: Bicester
- Postcode district: OX26
- Dialling code: 01869
- Police: Thames Valley
- Fire: Oxfordshire
- Ambulance: South Central
- UK Parliament: Bicester and Woodstock

Chesterton is a village and civil parish on Gagle Brook, a tributary of the Langford Brook in north Oxfordshire. The village is about 1 1/2 miles (2.4 km) southwest of the market town of Bicester. The village has sometimes been called Great Chesterton to distinguish it from the hamlet of Little Chesterton, about 3/4 mile (1.2 km) to the south in the same parish. The 2011 Census recorded the parish population as 850.

== Archaeology ==
About 1 3/4 miles (2.8 km) west of the village, by the crossroads of Akeman Street and the former Oxford – Brackley main road (now the B430) is a prehistoric tumulus. Chesterton village is on the course of Akeman Street, the Roman road between Watling Street and Cirencester, about 1 mile (1.6 km) northwest of Alchester Roman Town. The road forms part of the southwest boundary of the parish.

When the M40 motorway was extended from Wheatley to Birmingham in 1988–91, the motorway cut through Akeman Street about 3/4 mile (1.2 km) west of the village. The Roman layers of the road were exposed about 2.6 feet (0.8 m) below Akeman Street's modern surface. The Romans had metalled the road with brashy subsoil quarried from roadside ditches, had subsequently patched the surface, and finally resurfaced the road over a layer of 8 inches (0.2 metres) of soil and detritus.

== Toponym ==
A charter of Eynsham Abbey from AD 1003 records the toponym as Cestertune. The Domesday Book of 1086 records it as Cestretone. An entry in the Book of Fees from 1220 records it as Cestretune. It is derived from the Old English tūn, meaning an enclosed place, and ceaster, meaning a Roman station (referring to Alchester).

== Manor ==
Just before the Norman conquest the manor of Chesterton was held by Wigod, a Saxon thegn who was a kinsman of King Edward the Confessor. The Domesday Book records that by 1086 it was held by Miles Crispin, the son-in-law of Robert D'Oyly. Crispin had connections with Wallingford Castle, and Chesterton remained part of the feudal Honour of Wallingford until the 13th century. In 1272, it was sold to Edmund, 2nd Earl of Cornwall who founded Ashridge Priory in Hertfordshire in 1283 and granted the manor of Chesterton to the priory in 1285. Ashridge Priory was suppressed in the Dissolution of the Monasteries and in 1540 Sir Thomas Pope bought the manor of Chesterton.

A few years later the manor passed to John Williams, 1st Baron Williams de Thame, who in turn left it to his daughter Margery and son-in-law Henry Norris, 1st Baron Norreys. Their grandson Francis Norris, 1st Earl of Berkshire left it to his daughter Elizabeth. She left it to her daughter Bridget Wray, through whose marriage in about 1653 Chesterton passed to Montagu Bertie, 2nd Earl of Lindsey. Their son James Bertie, 5th Baron Norreys was created Earl of Abingdon, and it remained in their family until the death of Willoughby Bertie, 3rd Earl of Abingdon in 1760. In 1764 his trustees sold Chesterton to George Spencer, 4th Duke of Marlborough who in turn sold it to George Child Villiers, 5th Earl of Jersey in 1808. The manor remained with the Earls of Jersey until 1920-21 when the Jersey estates in Chesterton were divided and sold.

=== Manor house ===
Manor Farm House is in Manor Farm Lane. The oldest part of the building is a 12th-century barrel-vaulted undercroft, now incorporated into an annex of the building. A partly-blocked arched doorway and deeply-splayed window survive. The undercroft has very thick walls and is about 12m by 4.4m internally. Some remains of the upper storey survived but were demolished when a music room was built, as the significance of the building was not then recognised. The rest of the house is largely 16th- or 17th-century and was remodelled in the 18th century. It is a Grade II* listed building.

== Parish church ==
The oldest part of the Church of England parish church of St. Mary is a 12th-century three-bay arcade between the nave and the north aisle. The arcade is in the Transitional style between Norman and Early English Gothic. The church was rebuilt in the 13th century and reconsecrated in 1238. The chancel arch and arcade of the south aisle, both of which are Early English Gothic, date from this period. The Decorated Gothic bell tower was added early in the 14th century. The present Perpendicular Gothic windows in the south aisle were added in the 14th or 15th century. In the 15th century a clerestory was added to the nave and a five-light east window was inserted in the chancel.

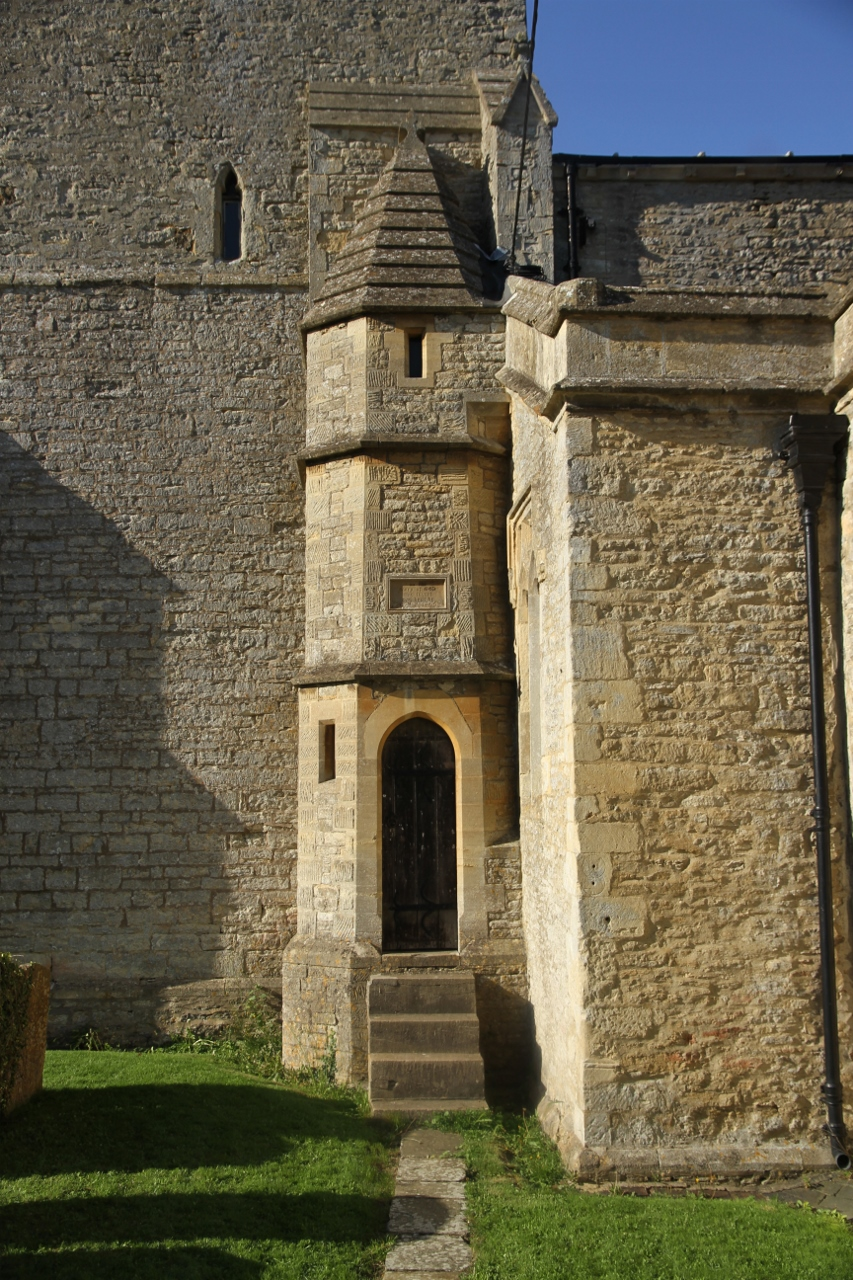
Stair turret added to St Mary's west tower in 1866

In 1852 the east window was replaced with a Gothic Revival Decorated Gothic four-light one, and in 1854 the chancel arch was restored. In 1866, the architect F.C. Penrose restored much of the building, including the windows in the south aisle and some of those in the north aisle. He also added a turret staircase to the tower. St. Mary's is a Grade II* listed building.

By 1552 St. Mary's had three bells and a Sanctus bell. William Watts of Bedford cast the present tenor bell in about 1590. Henry Farmer of Evesham in Worcestershire and James Keene of Woodstock jointly cast the present treble and second bells in 1623. Richard III Chandler of Drayton Parslow in Buckinghamshire cast the present Sanctus bell in 1715. The clock was added in 1884.

The priest and historian Gerald of Wales held the living of St. Mary's from about 1193 until his death in about 1223. St. Mary's parish is now a member of the Church of England Benefice of Akeman, which includes the parishes of Bletchingdon, Hampton Gay, Kirtlington, Middleton Stoney, Wendlebury and Weston-on-the-Green.

== Social and economic history ==
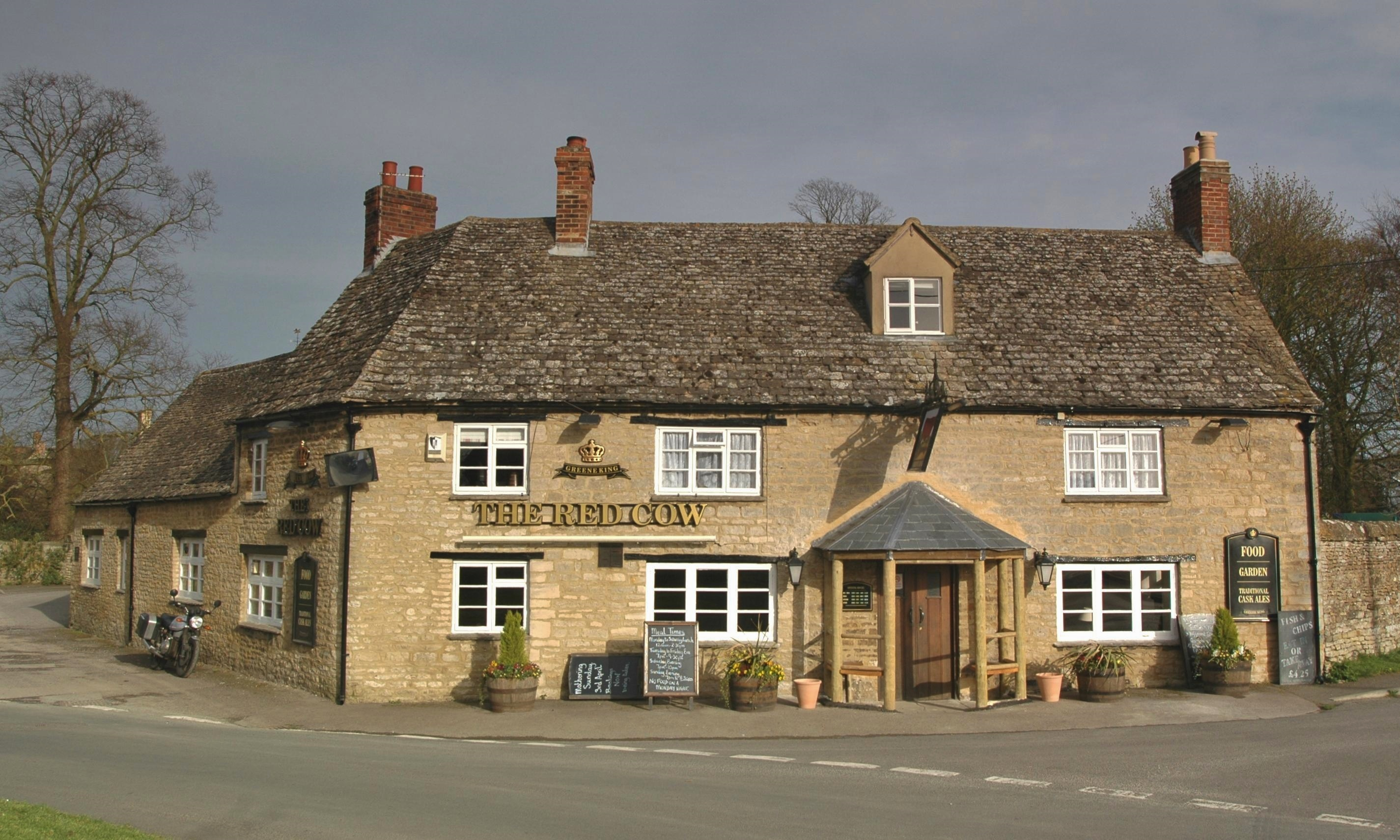
The Red Cow public house

Chesterton had a watermill since before the Norman Conquest, and by the time of the Hundred Rolls in 1279 a second had been built. Presumably the mills were on Gagle Brook. One mill survived until early in the 19th century, and for a time had been converted into a hemp mill. Chesterton's vicar of that time complained that despite the Duke of Marlborough having spent much money trying to improve the mill, it was not working well. The vicar may have been correct, for in 1822 it was closed down.

The village has a public house, the Red Cow, that was built around the turn of the 17th and 18th centuries. It is now controlled by Greene King Brewery.

The Village has a Hotel, Spa and Golf resort, Bicester Hotel Golf and Spa. Originally known as Chesterton Golf Club. Bicester Hotel, Golf, and Spa was a well established 18-hole Golf Resort until in 2020 it sold of the back 9-holes to the Great Wolf Development which is to include a water park. Bicester Hotel Golf and Spa is now a challenging 9-hole resort with 52 spacious bedrooms, conferencing facilities for 250, Spa and Treatment area, Open Water Swimming Lake, and a highly successful members Health Club. Bicester Hotel has been built and developed by the Payne family, namely Graham Payne who has owned the site for over 25 years. The resort's General Manager is Tyrone Bird.

An open field system prevailed in the parish until 1768, when an Act of Parliament enabled the enclosure of its common lands. 1,975 acres (799 ha) were enclosed, of which 1,173 acres (475 ha) were awarded to George Spencer, 4th Duke of Marlborough.

The main road between Bicester and Enstone passes through the north of the parish. In 1797 an Act of Parliament made this road into a turnpike. It was disturnpiked in the 19th century and is now the B4030.

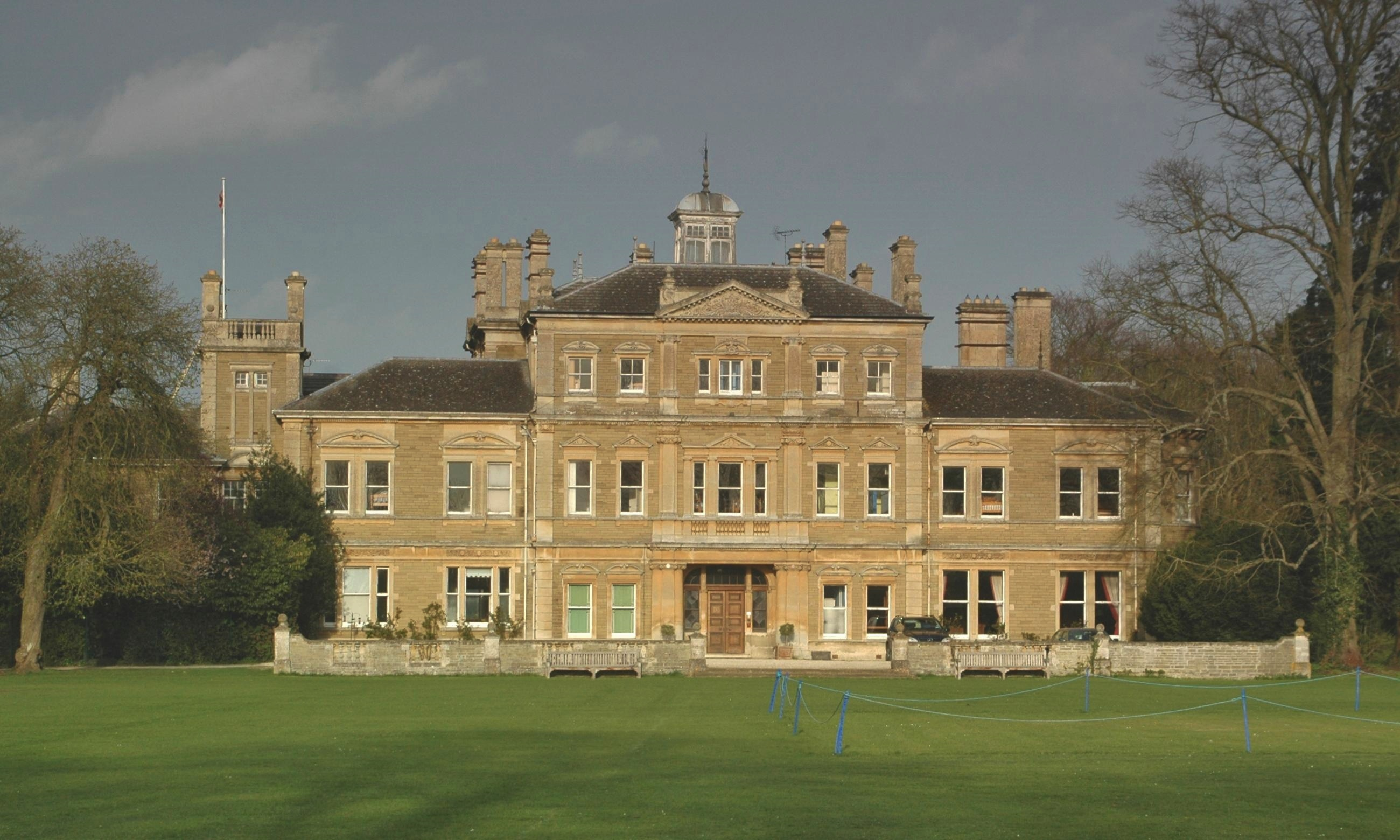
Chesterton Lodge, completed in 1890 and now Bruern Abbey Preparatory School

There was a mansion at the south-east end of Chesterton village by the early part of the 18th century. It was improved in the middle of the 18th century, and its grounds were extended for George Clarke, Sheriff of Oxfordshire by diverting part of Akeman Street. By 1823 it was the principal house in Chesterton, and Clarke's son lived there for many years. By 1887 the house was unoccupied and in 1889–90 it was replaced by a new Italianate house built for Henry Tubb, a banker of Bicester. In 1939 the Royal Exchange Assurance Corporation owned the house, but by 1955 it was Audley House mixed preparatory school. It is now Bruern Abbey Preparatory School.

Bignell on Gagle Brook was formerly a separate hamlet. Bignell House in Bignell Park was designed by the architect William Wilkinson and built in 1866 but was demolished before the end of the same century. The present Bignell House may date from 1892, which is the date on a copper ogee dome on a turret on one corner of the building.

In 1854 Lady Jersey had a school built for the parish. In 1933, it was reorganised as a junior school, since which time secondary school pupils from Chesterton have attended school in Bicester. The school is now a Church of England primary school.

In 2019, a proposal was submitted by the American indoor waterpark company Great Wolf Resorts to construct a branch of their Great Wolf Lodge chain in Chesterton as part of the brand's expansion into the European market. The proposal was accepted by planning inspectors in 2021, and construction commenced on the site in 2022.

=== Notable people ===
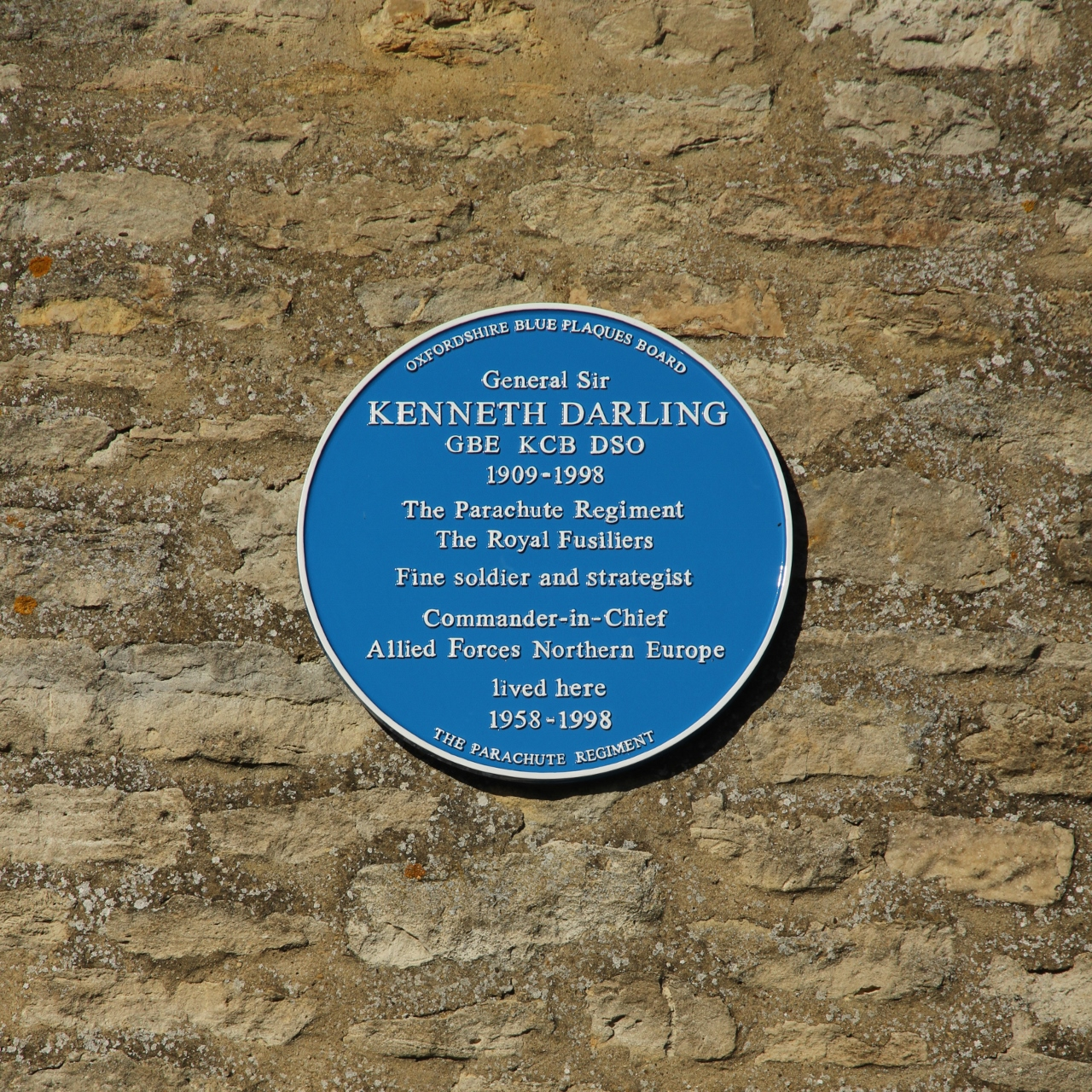
Oxfordshire Blue Plaque on General Sir Kenneth Darling's former home in Alchester Road

Lieutenant-General Sir Edwin Alderson (1859–1927), son-in-law of a former Vicar of St Mary's, is buried in the churchyard.

General Sir Kenneth Darling (1909–98) lived at Vicarage Farmhouse in Alchester Road from 1958 until his death.

== Sources ==
- Chambers, RA (1992). "The Archaeology of the M40 Motorway through Buckinghamshire, Northamptonshire and Oxfordshire, 1988-91". Oxoniensia. LVII. Oxfordshire Architectural and Historical Society: 43–54. ISSN 0308-5562.
- Ekwall, Eilert (1960) [1936]. Concise Oxford Dictionary of English Place-Names (4th ed.). Oxford: Oxford University Press. Chesterton. ISBN 0198691033.
- Lobel, Mary D, ed. (1959). A History of the County of Oxford. Victoria County History. Vol. 6: Ploughley Hundred. London: Oxford University Press for the Institute of Historical Research. pp. 92–103.
- Sherwood, Jennifer; Pevsner, Nikolaus (1974). Oxfordshire. The Buildings of England. Harmondsworth: Penguin Books. pp. 617–618. ISBN 0-14-071045-0.
