= Edith Forne =

English noblewoman who was the concubine of King Henry I of England

- Spouse: Robert D'Oyly the younger (m. 1120)
- Issue: Robert FitzEdith; Henry D'Oyly; Gilbert D'Oyly
- Father: Forn Sigulfson

Edith Forne (d. after 1129), was an English noblewoman who was the concubine of King Henry I of England and the foundress of Osney Abbey near Oxford.

Edith was the daughter of Forn Sigulfson, Lord of Greystoke, Cumberland.

Of Henry's illegitimate children, only one is known to be Edith's child: Robert FitzEdith, who married Maud d'Avranches in the early 1160s.

Two of Henry's illegitimate daughters have been suggested to be daughters of Edith:

- Matilda FitzRoy, Countess of Perche (c. 1080–1120). It is known that Matilda's mother was named Edith, but it is not known whether this was Edith Forne. The probable birth dates of Edith's known children make this unlikely.
- Adeliza. A woman named "Adeliza filia Reg" is named as a witness in a D'Oyly family charter.

In 1120, Henry married Edith to Robert D'Oyly the younger, second son of Nigel D'Oyly. As a marriage portion, she was granted the Manor of Cleydon, Buckinghamshire. Robert and Edith had at least two children: Henry, buried at Osney in 1163, and Gilbert.

In 1129, Edith persuaded her husband to build a church, in the Isle of Osney, near Oxford Castle, for the use of Augustine Canons: this became Osney Abbey. She told him that she had dreamt of the chattering of magpies, interpreted by a chaplain as souls in Purgatory who needed a church founding to expiate their sins.

Edith was buried in Osney Abbey, in a religious habit, as John Leland describes upon seeing her tomb as it was on the eve of the Dissolution: "Ther lyeth an image of Edith, of stone, in th' abbite of a vowess, holding a hart in her right hand, on the north side of the high altaire". The legendary dream of magpies was painted near the tomb.
