= Harpsden =

Village in Oxfordshire, England

Coordinates: 51.524°N 0.902°W

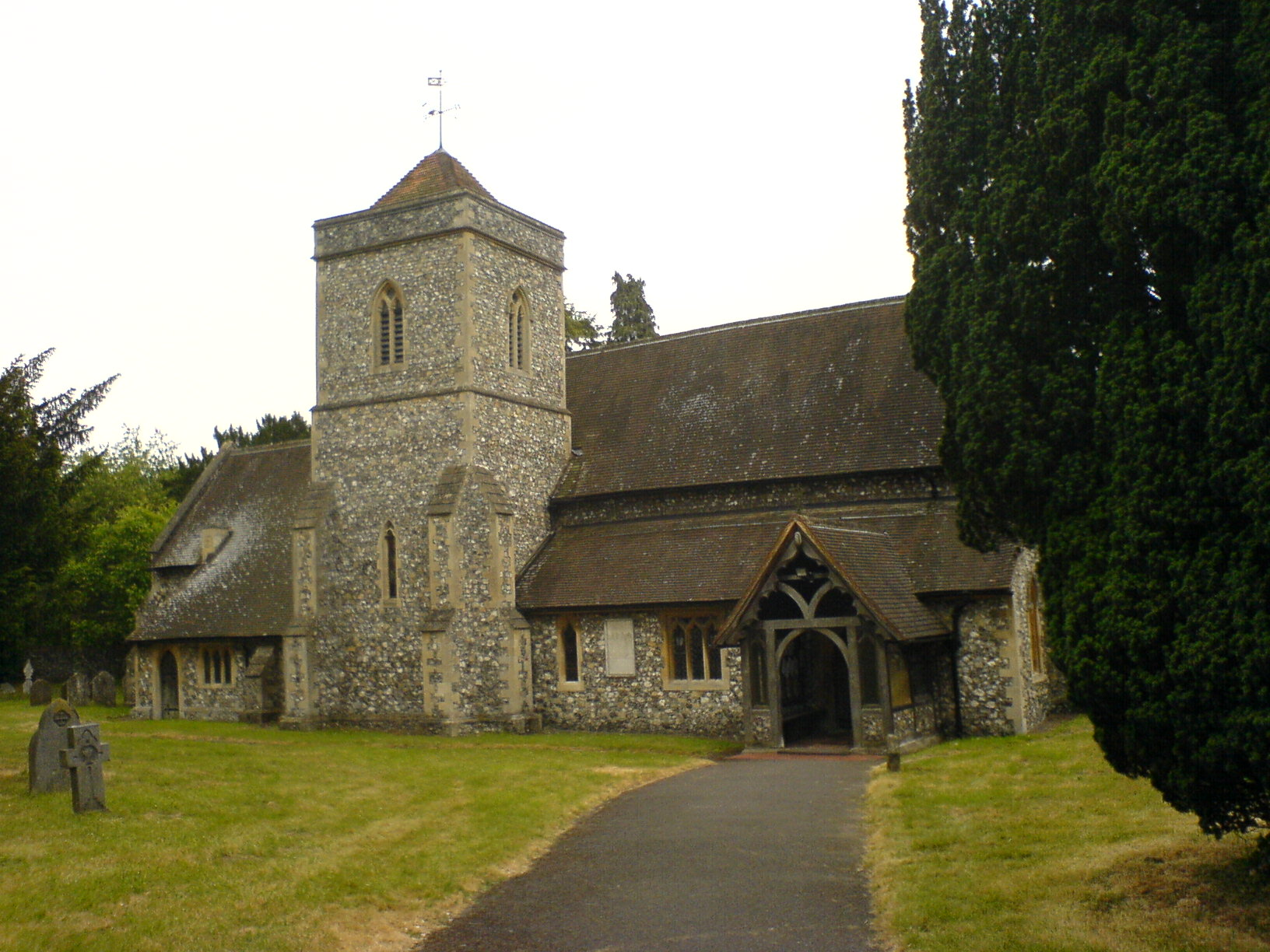
- Parish Church of Saint Margaret

- Location within Oxfordshire
- Area: 8.77 km^{2} (3.39 sq mi)
- Population: 560 (2001 census)
  - Density: 64/km^{2} (170/sq mi)
- OS grid reference: SU7680
  - London: 34 miles (55 km)
- Civil parish: Harpsden
- District: South Oxfordshire
- Shire county: Oxfordshire
- Region: South East
- Country: England
- Sovereign state: United Kingdom
- Post town: Henley-on-Thames
- Postcode district: RG9
- Dialling code: 01491
- Police: Thames Valley
- Fire: Oxfordshire
- Ambulance: South Central
- UK Parliament: Henley and Thame

Harpsden is a rural and semi-rural village and civil parish immediately south of Henley-on-Thames in South Oxfordshire, Oxfordshire, England. Its scattered centre is set 0.5 miles (0.80 km) from the east border which is the River Thames, marking a short boundary with Berkshire. The parish extends 5 miles (8.0 km) inland and borders Rotherfield Peppard to the west, that is, next to its main sections of woodland in the southern extreme of the Chiltern Hills including an SSSI area of ancient woodland. The village has neither a railway station nor shops, but has the main road from Reading to Henley, both of which have grown substantially since World War II into centres of trade, education and general meeting places, such as by their increased number of cafés and restaurants.

== History ==
Remains of a Roman villa have been found about 0.5 miles (800 m) southwest of the village. In the 11th century during the reign of King Edward the Confessor the manor of Harpsden belonged to Wigod, the thegn of Wallingford. After the Norman Conquest of England, Harpsden became part of the Honour of Wallingford. The Church of England parish church of Saint Margaret was originally late Norman, as evidenced by the piscina, font and a blocked doorway that survive from this period. The current windows in the nave and chancel were inserted in the 14th century, and a stone effigy of a knight dates from the same period. In 1848–54 the Gothic Revival architect Benjamin Ferrey lengthened the nave and added the north aisle and tower. In 1879 the architect Henry Woodyer restored the chancel.

Other notable buildings in the village include the Grade II* listed Harpsden Court: the current house largely dates back to the 17th century, and incorporates elements of the medieval manor house. It was the home of the Hall family until 1855. A weatherboarded barn near the church bears the date 1689. Bellehatch Park, about 0.75 miles (1.2 km) southwest of the village, was built early in the 19th century. It is a Georgian neoclassical country house of five bays with a Doric porch and summerhouse. It was the seat of the Liberal politician Cecil Norton, who was created first Baron Rathcreedan in 1916.

== Amenities ==
Harpsden Wood is an ancient woodland dating from at least 1600. It is a Site of Special Scientific Interest covering 73 acres (30 ha). Henley Golf Club is in Harpsden. Harpsden Cricket Club was founded in 1887 and thus celebrated its 125th anniversary in 2012.

== In media ==
Harpsden was used as a location in the Agatha Christie's Marple episodes "Nemesis" and "By the Pricking of My Thumbs". Harpsden Court has also been used as the set for many films, including Quantum of Solace.

== See also ==
- List of Sites of Special Scientific Interest in Oxfordshire

== Sources ==
- Townley, Simon C, ed. (2011). A History of the County of Oxford, Volume 16: Binfield Hundred (Part One): Henley-on-Thames and Environs. Victoria County History. Woodbridge: Boydell and Brewer. ISBN 978-1-904356-38-7.
