= Francis Penrose (surgeon) =

English surgeon and medical writer

- Born: 1718
- Died: 17 January 1798 (aged 79–80)
- Occupations: Surgeon and medical writer

Francis Penrose (1718 – 17 January 1798) was an English surgeon and medical writer.

== Biography ==
Penrose was born in 1718. He was a surgeon who practised for many years at Bicester in Oxfordshire. He purchased a property in the adjoining village of Chesterton, where, at the enclosure of the parish in 1767, he was the owner of a quarter of a yard of land, in lieu of which he received an allotment measuring 2 acres 3 roods 1 perch. He afterwards purchased the house and grounds now called Chesterton Lodge, which he greatly improved. The estate was sold after his death. Mr. Dunkin, the local historian, says of him in 1823 that he is chiefly remembered for his attempt to investigate the ruins of Alchester, the Roman station at the junction of two roads adjoining Chesterton. There, in a wood on the west side of the castrum, he discovered in 1766 the remains of a large building, within which were a tesselated pavement and a hypocaust. This building he described as the Prætorium. He left Bicester about 1782, and went to live in Stonehouse, Plymouth, but he did not practise his profession in Devonshire.

He died at Hatfield 17 Jan. 1798, in the house of his son, James Penrose (1750–1818), who was appointed surgeon-extraordinary to the king in November 1793, in succession to John Hunter. Father and son were buried in the churchyard at Hatfield, though no trace of their tombstone exists.

Penrose was a voluminous writer of pamphlets upon scientific subjects cognate to medicine. His works do not, as a rule, repay perusal. They are:

- ‘A Treatise on Electricity, wherein its various Phenomena are accounted for, and the Cause of Attraction and Gravitation of Solids assigned, by Francis Penrose, Surgeon at Bicester, Oxfordshire,’ Oxford, 8vo, 1752.
- ‘An Essay on Magnetism, or an endeavour to explain the various properties and effects of the Loadstone, together with the causes of the same,’ Oxford, 8vo, 1753.
- ‘Physical Essay on the Animal Economy, wherein the Circulation of the Blood and its causes are particularly considered with the Diseases which attend a disordered state of the Circulation,’ London, 8vo, 1754, and Oxford, 8vo, 1766. This is a poor work, in which old physiological theories are revivified.
- ‘Dissertation on the Inflammatory, Gangrenous, and Putrid Sore Throat, also on the Putrid Fever, together with the diagnostics and method of cure,’ Oxford, 8vo, 1766. This is a practical treatise, in which the writer narrates cases he has himself seen in the course of his practice.
- ‘Letters Philosophical and Astronomical, in which the following operations of nature are explained in the most simple and natural manner, according to Sir Isaac Newton's opinion, viz., the creation, the deluge, vegetation, the make and form of this terraqueous globe,’ &c., Plymouth, 8vo, 1789. These letters were originally written to John Heaviside, M.D., and were dated from Stonehouse in 1783. They are dedicated to Sir Joseph Banks and to the fellows of the Royal Society. The critical reviews in December 1788 say of them that ‘the Mosaic account of the creation is here explained and defended, as well as the deluge, and gravity is accounted for by hot and cold ether.’
- ‘Letters on Philosophical Subjects,’ London, 8vo, 1794. This is a second edition of the previous work, with an amended title. It is dated from Stonehouse, Plymouth, 30 June 1788.
- ‘Essays Physiological and Practical, founded on the modern chemistry of Lavoisier, Fourcroy, &c., with a view to the improvement of the practice of medicine,’ by Francis Penrose, M.D., London, 8vo, 1794. These essays were severely handled in the first volume of the ‘Medico-Chirurgical Review,’ the reviewer either believing, or affecting to believe, their author to be a recently qualified practitioner of medicine. In the title-page of this work he styles himself M.D. for the first time; he is supposed to have obtained the degree at some German university.
