= Nigel D'Oyly =

Anglo-Norman nobleman

Nigel D'Oyly was an 11th- and 12th-century nobleman of England and, in 1120, the Lord of Oxford Castle, and briefly the Lord of Wallingford Castle.

== Biography ==
D'Oyly was the son of Walter D'Oyly and the younger brother of Robert D'Oyly, a follower of William the Conqueror and founder of Oxford Castle.

At some point between 1086 and 1094, D'Oyly was granted possession of two mills on the west side of Grandpont by Abbot Columbanus of Oxford; however, by 1109, the mills were recorded as having been reconfirmed to the abbey.

D'Oyly married Agnes and left two sons, Robert D'Oyly the younger, the eldest son, who succeeded as Lord High Constable and Baron of Hocknorton and Fulk, buried at Eynesham in 1126. In 1120, King Henry I of England caused Edith Forne, his concubine, to marry Robert. As a marriage portion, he gave her the Manor of Claydon, Buckinghamshire.
