= Matilda D'Oyly =

Saxon noblewoman (fl. 1147)

Matilda D'Oyly (also known as Maud D'Oyly; floruit 1147) was an eleventh-century Saxon noble. She was sometimes called Matilda of Wallingford.

== Early life and ancestry ==
D'Oyly was the daughter of Robert D'Oyly and his wife Aldgytha, daughter of Wigod. She was an only child.

== Civil war ==
During the civil war known as the Anarchy, D'Oyly backed Henry I’s daughter, the Empress Matilda, in her struggle against her cousin, King Stephen. She defended Wallingford Castle against Stephen from 1139 to 1152. In 1141, after escaping from Oxford, the Empress sought refuge in Wallingford.

== Marriages ==
In 1084, D'Oyly married Miles Crispin. They remained married until his death in 1107.

In around 1114, D'Oyly remarried to Brian Fitz Count.

== Legacy ==
Matilda's seal is the earliest extant impression of a non-royal secular noblewoman’s seal, from a charter that was written between 1122 and 1147. The seal is currently held by the College of St George at Windsor Castle.
