= Robert FitzEdith =

Illegitimate son of Henry I of England

- Feudal Lord of Okehampton
- Died: 1172
- Spouse: Matilda d'Avranches
- Issue: Mathilde
- Father: Henry I of England
- Mother: Edith Forne

Robert FitzEdith, feudal lord of Okehampton (d. 1172) was an illegitimate son of Henry I of England and his mistress Edith Forne, daughter of Forn Sigulfson, Lord of Greystoke, Cumberland. Compared to many of his illegitimate siblings and half-siblings, little is known about him.

== Marriage and family ==
By 1162, Robert married Matilda d'Avranches, heiress of the feudal barony of Okehampton, Devon, and widow of William de Courcy. They had one daughter, Mathilde (also known as Maud and Hawise), who married Renaud, Sire of Courtenay (son of Miles, Sire of Courtenay and Ermengarde of Nevers) c. 1194. She later married Henry de Ferrières c. 1207. Robert died of natural causes.
