= Toki, son of Wigod =

Toki, son of Wigod of Wallingford, was an Englishman in the service of William the Conqueror.

The 'D' version of the Anglo-Saxon Chronicle records that Toki was killed fighting for William against his eldest son Robert Curthose at Gerberoi during the winter of 1078/ 1079. It records that Toki was killed by a crossbow bolt immediately after supplying William with a new horse.

William's biographer, David Bates, suggests that this shows Toki to have been a member of William's elite personal military household.
