= Robert D'Oyly (Osney) =

Anglo-Norman nobleman

Robert D'Oyly was a 12th-century English nobleman, son of Nigel D'Oyly, and nephew of Robert D'Oyly, founder of Oxford Castle.

Robert married Edith Forne, daughter of Lord Greystoke, who had been King Henry I of England's concubine, in 1120. The marriage also meant Robert became Lord of the Manor of Cleydon.

In 1129, Robert was persuaded by his wife to build the Church of St Mary, in the Isle of Osney, near Oxford Castle, for the use of Augustine Monks—this was to become Osney Abbey.

By 1141 Robert had inherited his father's position of Lord of Oxford Castle and Baron Hocknorton and it was he that declared his support for Empress Matilda against King Stephen, giving her protection in Oxford between 1141 and the winter of 1142. It is because of this action that Stephen came to Oxford and besieged the castle for three months, burning the city down in the process. Matilda supposedly escaped by dressing in white as a form of camouflage against the snow-covered ground, and fleeing across the frozen Castle Mill Stream. It is likely that Robert died shortly after this as governorship of the castle changed hands, though whether his death was at the hands of the King is not known.

Robert and Edith had at least two children—Henry, buried at Osney in 1163, and Gilbert. Henry became 4th Baron Hocknorton and Kings Constable and married Margery, daughter of Humphrey de Bohun, Earl of Hereford.

Robert was buried at Eynsham, Oxfordshire.
