= Honour of Wallingford =

Feudal barony in medieval England

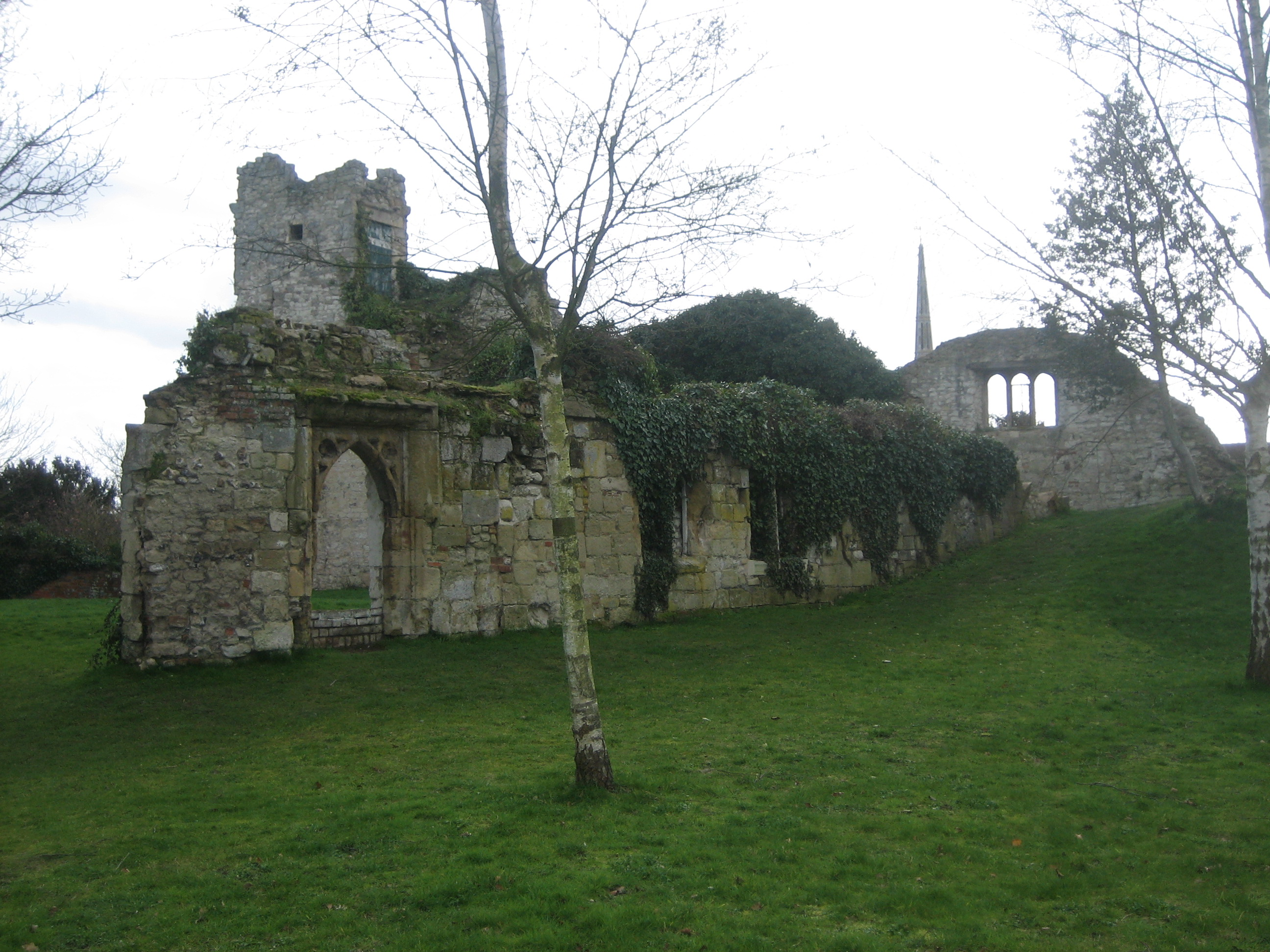
Ruins of Wallingford Castle

The Honour of Wallingford (or feudal barony of Wallingford) was a medieval English feudal barony which existed between 1066 and 1540 with its caput at Wallingford Castle in present-day Oxfordshire.

The Honour of Wallingford was established after the Norman Conquest of England in 1066. The Honour initially comprised the manors of Wallingford and Harpsden and thereafter gained numerous other manors. In the late 11th century Miles Crispin (d.1107) held the larger of the 2 estates contained within the manor of Alkerton in Oxfordshire, as part of the Honour of Wallingford. After Crispin's death in 1107 his widow Maud supported the Empress Matilda during the Anarchy. When King Stephen defeated Matilda, Maud entered a religious house and King Stephen gave her estate to Henry, Duke of Normandy. This made Aston Rowant part of the Honour of Wallingford. The Honour of Wallingford also included Newton Purcell. The honour of Wallingford is specifically mentioned in chapter 43 of Magna Carta of 1215 as being then in the hands of King John, having escheated from its previous holder. The chapter dealt with the barons' complaints about the levels of feudal relief due on lands held from such escheated baronies. Until the 13th century, Chesterton, Oxfordshire was part of the honour. In 1360 Pyrton manor was recorded as part of the honour.

In the 13th century the Honour of St. Valery passed to the Earl of Cornwall, who at that time also held the Honour of Wallingford. When Edmund, 2nd Earl of Cornwall died childless in 1300, however, the Honour of St. Valery passed to the Crown. By 1414, the Honour of St. Valery was part of this honour. In 1540 the honour was separated from the Duchy of Cornwall by Act of Parliament (32 Hen. 8 c. 53), at which point it became part of the newly created Honour of Ewelme.

Recipients of the Honour of Wallingford include Piers Gaveston, 1st Earl of Cornwall, who was given it together with Cornwall by Edward II in 1307 (see Materials in cornish law). Thomas Chaucer was given the honour by Henry IV in 1399. William de la Pole, 1st Duke of Suffolk became constable of Wallingford Castle in 1434 and at the time of his murder in 1450 his properties included the honour. These passed to his wife (daughter of Thomas Chaucer) Alice de la Pole. Their son, John de la Pole, 2nd Duke of Suffolk, also held the honour.

== Sources ==
- Crossley, Alan; Elrington, C.R. (eds.); Baggs, A.P.; Blair, W.J.; Chance, Eleanor; Colvin, Christina; Cooper, Janet; Day, C.J.; Selwyn, Nesta; Townley, Simon C. (1990). A History of the County of Oxford, Volume 12: Wootton Hundred (South) including Woodstock. Victoria County History. pp. 36–54. ISBN 978-0-19-722774-9.
- Keats-Rohan, K.S.B. (1989). "The devolution of the Honour of Wallingford, 1066–1148". Oxoniensia. LIV. Oxfordshire Architectural and Historical Society: 311–318.
- Lobel, Mary D, ed. (1959). A History of the County of Oxford: Volume 6. Victoria County History. pp. 262–267.
- Lobel, Mary D, ed. (1964). A History of the County of Oxford: Volume 8: Lewknor and Pyrton Hundreds. Victoria County History. pp. 16–43.
- Lobel, Mary D; Crossley, Alan, eds. (1969). A History of the County of Oxford: Volume 9. Victoria County History. pp. 44–53.
- Page, W.H.; Ditchfield, P.H., eds. (1923). A History of the County of Berkshire, Volume 3. Victoria County History. pp. 531–539.
