= Kingston Crossing Halt railway station =

Oxfordshire railway station

Coordinates: 51.6819°N 0.9286°W

Kingston Crossing Halt
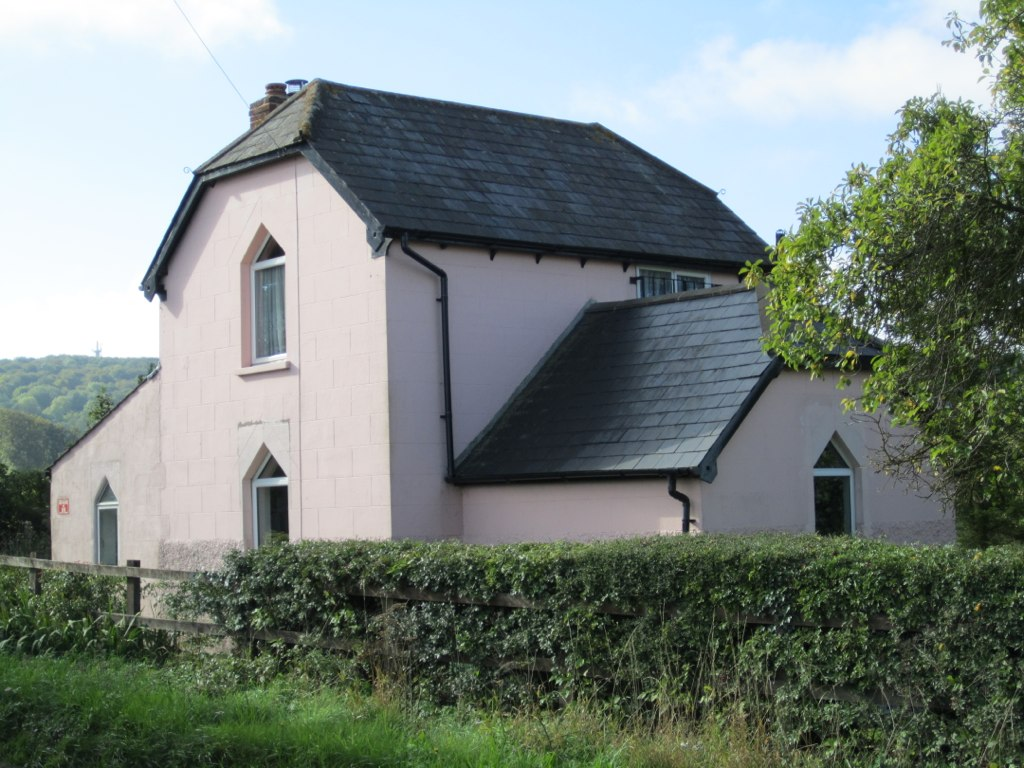

General information
- Location: Kingston Blount, South Oxfordshire; England
- Grid reference: SU741986
- Platforms: 1

Other information
- Status: Disused

History
- Original company: Great Western Railway
- Pre-grouping: Great Western Railway
- Post-grouping: Great Western Railway; Western Region of British Railways

Key dates
- 1 September 1906: Station opened
- 1 July 1957: Closed
Location

Kingston Crossing Halt railway station was a halt on the Watlington and Princes Risborough Railway which the Great Western Railway opened in 1906 to serve the Oxfordshire village of Kingston Blount. The opening of the halt was part of a GWR attempt to encourage more passengers on the line at a time when competition from bus services was drawing away custom.

== History ==
The halt was one of three that the GWR opened on the line in September 1906 to try to encourage passenger traffic in the face of increased competition from buses. It was southeast of Kingston Blount on the northeastern side of the level crossing on Kingston Hill. The halt was maintained by the residents of the primitive crossing house located on the other side of the level crossing; unlike at Wainhill Crossing Halt, the level crossing gates were normally kept closed across the railway line to allow the free passage of traffic between Kingston Blount and the A40 road. The crossing keeper closed the gates across the road before the arrival of each train, with the exception of the early morning and late night goods services, when the guard was responsible. The station had basic facilities: a single low platform on which stood a wooden passenger waiting shelter and the running in board. Up to twelve passengers were known to have caught the early morning services in the 1940s. In the long term the GWR's halt strategy did little to dissuade people from more convenient bus services. In 1957 British Railways closed the halt and withdrew passenger services from the line.

Preceding station	Disused railways	Following station
Chinnor; Line closed, station open	Great Western Railway; Watlington and Princes Risborough Railway	Aston Rowant; Line and station closed

== Present day ==
The cottage at the halt remains intact. One can see in the garden of the cottage small line side buildings and huts that can be identified in photographs taken when the line was still in operation. The Upper Icknield Way runs parallel to the former railway alignment to the east for several hundred yards.

The Heritage Chinnor and Princes Risborough Railway aims to hopefully extend their own running line through this former site to Aston Rowant, (Although this may not include reinstating this crossing site, as it could never be alighted, as was the same as two other halt sites down the line towards Thame Junction).

== Sources ==
- Butt, R. V. J. (October 1995). The Directory of Railway Stations: details every public and private passenger station, halt, platform and stopping place, past and present (1st ed.). Sparkford: Patrick Stephens Ltd. ISBN 978-1-85260-508-7. OCLC 60251199. OL 11956311M.
- Clinker, C.R. (October 1978). Clinker's Register of Closed Passenger Stations and Goods Depots in England, Scotland and Wales 1830-1977. Bristol: Avon-Anglia Publications & Services. ISBN 0-905466-19-5.
- Jowett, Alan (2000). Jowett's Nationalised Railway Atlas (1st ed.). Penryn, Cornwall: Atlantic Transport Publishers. ISBN 978-0-906899-99-1. OCLC 228266687.
- Jowett, Alan (March 1989). Jowett's Railway Atlas of Great Britain and Ireland: From Pre-Grouping to the Present Day (1st ed.). Sparkford: Patrick Stephens Ltd. ISBN 978-1-85260-086-0. OCLC 22311137.
- Karau, Paul; Turner, Chris (1998). Country branch line: An intimate portrait of the Watlington branch. Vol 2: The stations. Didcot: Wild Swan. ISBN 1-874103-46-1.
- Oppitz, Leslie (2000). Lost Railways of the Chilterns. Newbury: Countryside Books. pp. 20–23. ISBN 1-85306-643-5.
