= Aston Rowant railway station =

Oxfordshire railway station

Coordinates: 51.67432°N 0.94744°W

Aston Rowant
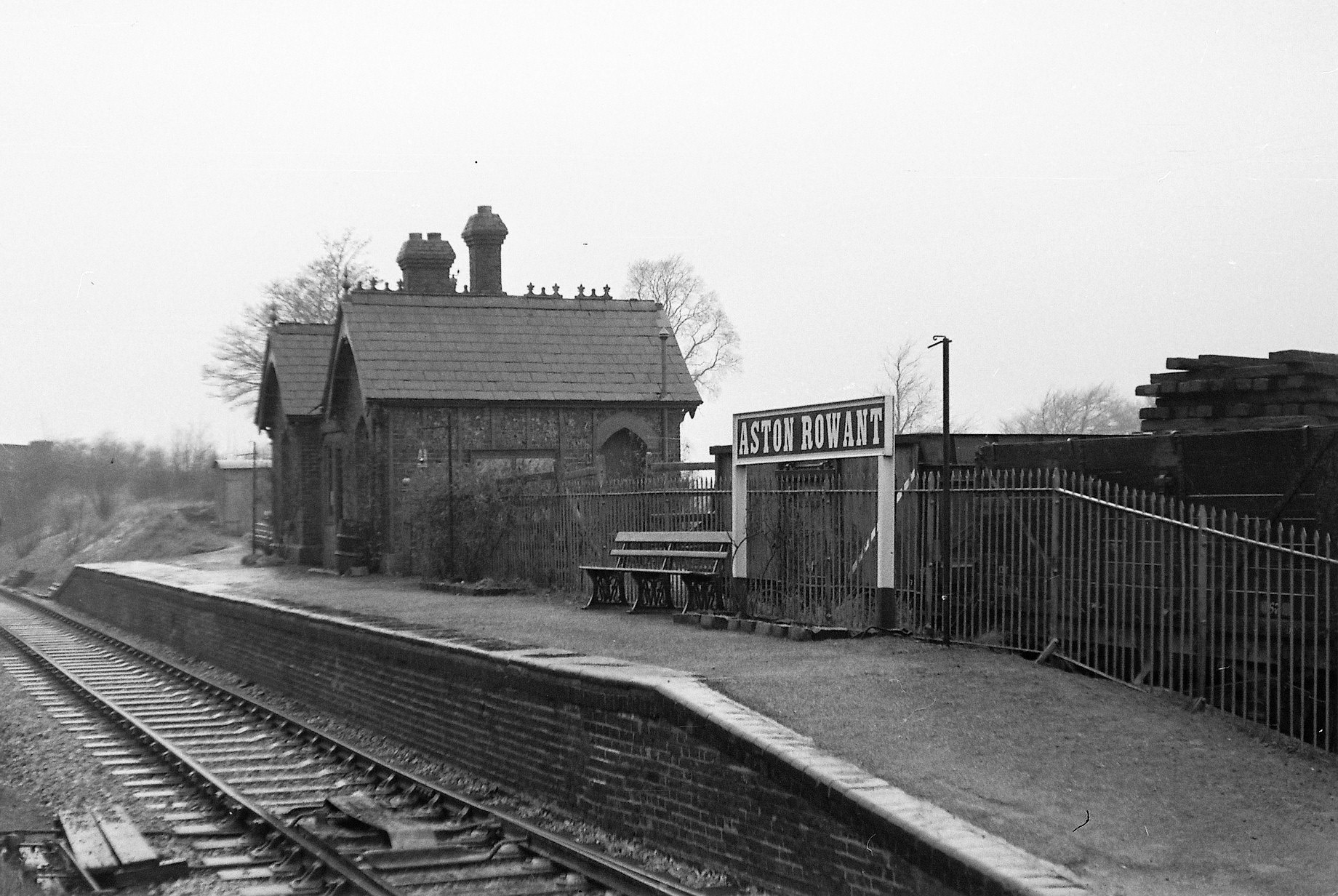

General information
- Location: Aston Rowant, South Oxfordshire; England
- Grid reference: SU728978
- Platforms: 1

Other information
- Status: Disused

History
- Original company: Watlington and Princes Risborough Railway
- Pre-grouping: Great Western Railway
- Post-grouping: Great Western Railway; Western Region of British Railways

Key dates
- 15 August 1872: Station opened
- 1 July 1957: Closed to passengers
- 2 January 1961: Closed to goods
Location

Aston Rowant railway station was opened in 1872 and was a part of the Watlington and Princes Risborough Railway. It served the village of Aston Rowant in Oxfordshire. The station closed in 1961.

== History ==
Operated from the outset by the Great Western Railway it stayed part of that company after the Grouping of 1923. The station passed on to the Western Region of British Railways on nationalisation in 1948, and was then closed by the British Transport Commission. The station was closed to passengers on 1 July 1957 and to goods in January 1961.

A single track ran through the station then on under a bridge carrying the A40 main road between Oxford and London.

Preceding station	Disused railways	Following station
Kingston Crossing Halt; Line and station closed	Great Western Railway; Watlington and Princes Risborough Railway	Lewknor Bridge Halt; Line and station closed

The station appeared in four films: The Captive Heart (1946), My Brother Jonathan (1947), My Brother's Keeper (1948) and Portrait of Clare (1950). Excerpts of these films can be found at The Watlington Branch Line YouTube Playlist.

== Present day ==
The station site is to be found just before the B4009 road meets the A40 road at the bottom of Beacon Hill near the M40 motorway. If approaching from the direction of Stokenchurch, the site is immediately to the right after passing the Icknield Way. The site is at a point where a bridge took the road over the line; this overbridge remains but is infilled to road level.

The actual station site is to be found near a path through a wooded area. An area where some remains may be covered is near the edge where the earth is piled high with little undergrowth. The area is now overgrown, yet a flat concrete surface is visible and the track bed is still apparent in undergrowth at the end of the flat area.

If explored, the overgrown area of the site reveals signs of the station's platform. The original railings of the platform are heavily bent and twisted from nature but are still in their original position. The goods platform too can still be clearly made out showing the brick construction. Bricks etc. can be found strewn around this area of the site and at the edges, where the original boundary fences remain.

== Future ==
There were reports in 1997 that the Chinnor and Princes Risborough Railway (CPRR) wished to extend its operations to Aston Rowant. A joint venture between the CPRR and Chiltern Railways was also proposed whereby the national rail operator would construct a new station at Aston Rowant to allow frequent weekday commuter services along the Icknield Line to connect with main line traffic through to London Marylebone, leaving the CPPR to run heritage services at other times. The scheme, which would cost around £3m, would seek to take advantage of Aston Rowant's location near junction 6 of the busy M40 motorway.

== Sources ==
- Butt, R. V. J. (October 1995). The Directory of Railway Stations: details every public and private passenger station, halt, platform and stopping place, past and present (1st ed.). Sparkford: Patrick Stephens Ltd. ISBN 978-1-85260-508-7. OCLC 60251199. OL 11956311M.
- Clinker, C.R. (October 1978). Clinker's Register of Closed Passenger Stations and Goods Depots in England, Scotland and Wales 1830–1977. Bristol: Avon-Anglia Publications & Services. ISBN 0-905466-19-5.
- Jowett, Alan (2000). Jowett's Nationalised Railway Atlas (1st ed.). Penryn, Cornwall: Atlantic Transport Publishers. ISBN 978-0-906899-99-1. OCLC 228266687.
- Jowett, Alan (March 1989). Jowett's Railway Atlas of Great Britain and Ireland: From Pre-Grouping to the Present Day (1st ed.). Sparkford: Patrick Stephens Ltd. ISBN 978-1-85260-086-0. OCLC 22311137.
- Oppitz, Leslie (2000). Lost Railways of the Chilterns. Newbury: Countryside Books. pp. 20–23. ISBN 1-85306-643-5.
