= Kingston Blount =

Village in Oxfordshire, England

Coordinates: 51.689°N 0.931°W

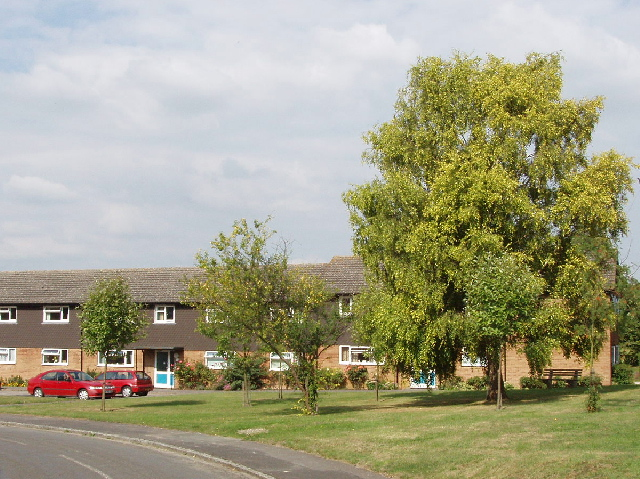
- Houses in Baker's Piece, Kingston Blount

- Location within Oxfordshire
- OS grid reference: SU7399
  - London: 33 miles (53 km)
- Civil parish: Aston Rowant
- District: South Oxfordshire
- Shire county: Oxfordshire
- Region: South East
- Country: England
- Sovereign state: United Kingdom
- Post town: CHINNOR
- Postcode district: OX39
- Dialling code: 01844
- Police: Thames Valley
- Fire: Oxfordshire
- Ambulance: South Central
- UK Parliament: Henley
- Website: Aston Rowant Parish Council

Kingston Blount is a village about 4 miles (6.4 km) southeast of Thame in South Oxfordshire, England. The village is a spring line settlement at the foot of the Chiltern Hills escarpment. The ancient pre-Roman Ridgeway and Icknield Way pass through the parish. The Ridgeway is now a National Trail.

== History ==
The village appears in the 1086 Domesday Book as "Chingestone". "Blount" comes from the family of that name who were Lords of the Manor in the 13th and 14th centuries.

The Church of England parish church of Saint John was designed by Aston Webb and built in 1877. It is red brick, has the nave and chancel under a single roof and a small south aisle. The building is now a redundant church. Cop Court is an early 18th-century house built around the remains of an earlier, probably 16th-century one. On the south side is a medieval bastion from an even earlier building on the site.

== Economy and amenities ==
The village had one public house, The Cherry Tree. There is a large playing field where the village's main events are held. Kingston Blount has a Point-to-point course. Kingston Crossing Halt railway station served the village with connections to Princes Risborough until its closure.

C.J. Day Associates is an engineering business in Kingston Blount that specialises in biomass power plant for industry. Projects include a 5 MWe tyre fuel power plant in Portugal and wood chip and waste fuel projects in the UK. Current projects include proposed power stations in Bishops Castle and Tenbury Wells, both of which have attracted criticism. Chris Day gave evidence on the subject to Parliament in 2004.

== Sources and further reading ==
- Lobel, Mary D, ed. (1964). A History of the County of Oxford: Volume 8: Lewknor and Pyrton Hundreds. Victoria County History. pp. 16–43.
- Sherwood, Jennifer; Pevsner, Nikolaus (1974). Oxfordshire. The Buildings of England. Harmondsworth: Penguin Books. p. 675. ISBN 0-14-071045-0.
