= List of prisoners at Wallingford Castle =

Prisoners at Wallingford Castle included the following:

- Ealdred of Abingdon
- Edward I
- Richard, 1st Earl of Cornwall
- Maurice de Berkeley, 2nd Lord Berkeley
- Maurice de Berkeley
- Waleran de Beaumont
- Henry of Almain
- Walter Langton
- Robert de Ferrers
- Owen Tudor
- Henry Holland, 3rd Duke of Exeter
- Margaret of Anjou
- Charles of Orléans
- Sir Richard Browne, 1st Baronet, of London
- John Clotworthy
- David Jenkins (Royalist)
