= My Brother's Keeper (film) =

- UK release poster
- Directed by: Alfred Roome
- Written by: Frank Harvey
- Story by: Maurice Wiltshire
- Produced by: Sydney Box
- Starring: Jack Warner; George Cole
- Cinematography: Gordon Lang
- Edited by: Esmond Seal
- Music by: Clifton Parker
- Production company: Gainsborough Pictures
- Distributed by: General Film Distributors
- Release date: 9 August 1948
- Running time: 96 minutes
- Country: United Kingdom
- Language: English
- Budget: £113,600 or £100,000
- Box office: £104,200

My Brother's Keeper is a 1948 British crime film directed by Alfred Roome and starring Jack Warner and George Cole. It was written by Frank Harvey from a story by Maurice Wiltshire. It was produced by Sydney Box for Gainsborough Pictures.

It was the first of only two films directed by Roome, the other being It's Not Cricket (1949), during a long career as a film editor.

== Plot ==
Handcuffed together, George Martin and Willie Stannard are two prisoners being transported to prison. Martin is a hardened, cynical career criminal, while Stannard is a naïve, rather dull-witted youth who has never previously been in trouble with the law, maintains his innocence of the rape of which he has been accused and is terrified by the prospect of prison. During the journey the pair manage to escape. Martin steals an army corporal's uniform and passes Stannard off as a deserter in his charge being returned to face a military tribunal, which explains why they are handcuffed together.

The escape location has been chosen by Martin for its proximity to a garage run by his mistress Nora Lawrence, who provides the pair with overnight shelter. The following day Martin and Stannard take refuge in a derelict isolated cottage. While trying to file their handcuffs apart they are surprised by a man hunting with a shotgun. Martin strikes the man on the head, killing him. Shortly thereafter they manage to separate the handcuffs and Martin abandons Stannard, going on the run alone. Stannard gives himself up and is promptly charged with murder.

Martin manages to contact his wife in London, asking if she can find a way to get money to him. She arranges to travel in a taxi driven by a friend of hers to where he is hiding and to leave clothes and money for him at a barber's shop. Just as she arrives, the police have tracked Martin down and have him cornered, halting her progress. Rather than give himself up, Martin makes a final doomed attempt to escape through a warning-signed minefield, watched by police, reporters, his wife, mistress and a crowd of sensation-seeking gawkers.

== Cast ==
- Jack Warner as George Martin
- Jane Hylton as Nora Lawrence
- David Tomlinson as Ronnie Waring
- George Cole as Willie Stannard
- Yvonne Owen as Meg Waring
- Raymond Lovell as Bill Wainwright
- Bill Owen as Syd Evans
- Brenda Bruce as Winnie Foreman
- Susan Shaw as Beryl
- Beatrice Varley as Jenny Martin
- Garry Marsh as Brewster
- Maurice Denham as Superintendent Trent
- Frederick Piper as Gordon
- Wilfrid Hyde-White as Harding
- John Boxer as Police Sergeant Bert Foreman
- Amy Veness as Mrs. Gully
- Fred Groves as Crown Hotel landlord
- Arthur Hambling as Edward Hodges
- Valentine Dyall as Inspector at Milton Wells
- George Merritt as Constable at Milton Wells
- Jack Raine as Chief Constable Col. Heatherly
- Ben Williams as policeman at Nora's garage
- Christopher Lee as second Constable

== Production ==
The film was originally known as Double Pursuit. It was produced by Sydney Box who had just taken over as head of production at Gainsborough Studios and was keen to develop new talent via lower budget films. The film was based on a story by journalist Maurice Wiltshire, his first for cinema; it was the first screenplay for Frank Harvey, first credit as full producer for Anthony Yarnborough, first film for Alfred Roome, first film for the editor and cinematographer, and first starring role for George Cole.

Filming started in December 1947. Gainsborough had meant to make another film that month called Roses Her Pillow, but production on that was postponed when Margaret Lockwood refused to star and Sydney Box could not find anyone he felt was suitable to replace her, so he brought forward Double Pursuit on the studio's schedule. The original stars announced were Jack Warner, John McCallum and Peter Hammond. McCallum and Hammond did not appear in the final film.

The film was shot in 45 days, nine ahead of schedule and £20,000 under budget.

My Brother's Keeper's exterior location sequences were filmed in the Buckinghamshire/Oxfordshire border area, including scenes shot at the now abandoned Aston Rowant railway station.

== Reception ==
=== Box office ===
By December 1949 the film earned £93,600. Eventually, producer's receipts were £81,200 in the UK and £23,000 overseas. According to one account, this meant the film recorded a loss of £9,400.

=== Critical ===
The Monthly Film Bulletin wrote: "There are outstandingly good moments in this film ... the cutting throughout is good but the pace is slow in the wrong places and the suspense of hunting and the hunted is consequently weakened. Jane Hylton is excellent as the roughly human Nora Lawrence. Jack Warner makes a cold, jagged human being of Martin, the criminal, but the outstanding performance of the film comes from George Cole, a very promising character actor, as Willie Stannard. The supporting cast help to maintain the real quality of the film, which lies in its warm characterisation of ordinary everyday people."

Kine Weekly wrote: "Lop-sided manhunt, staged in the west country. A hue-and-cry over escaped prisoners, one a hardened old-timer and the other a simple youth, it deals mainly with the psychology and background of the senior, offender. Unfortunately, the other character is more interesting and the better played – George Cole is first-rate – and the unevenness of the cliché-ridden narrative, further stressed by feeble comedy relief, fails to hold the interest. ... Jack Warner fails to get under the skin of his part as tough guy Martin. George Cole is much nearer the mark as simpleton Willie. He should go far."

The Daily Film Renter wrote: "Straightforward, unspectacular story is unfolded and acted with considerable effectiveness ... Jack Warner, as George, gives a character study both subtle and compelling; and George Cole is excellent as the weak-natured Willie."

Picturegoer wrote: "Jack Warner is good as the specious crook, who does not stop short of murder, and a very effective study comes from George Cole as the frightened and cowed youth."

Variety wrote: "In his first starring part, Jack Warner departs from his customary comedian role and proves an all-round actor. Jane Hylton seems a girl of promise and turns in a neat performance as Warner's girl friend, but acting honors go to George Cole as the frightened accomplice."

In The Radio Times Guide to Films David Parkinson gave the film 2/5 stars, writing: "A decade before Tony Curtis and Sidney Poitier played The Defiant Ones, Jack Warner and George Cole starred as a couple of convicts whose escape is hindered by the fact that they are handcuffed together. Replacing the racial theme is the neat twist that only one of the runaways is guilty. Under the direction of Alfred Roome and Roy Rich, however, their perils are often predictable."

Leslie Halliwell wrote "Social melodrama, quite well-made but suffering from miscasting."

== See also ==
- The Defiant Ones
