= Brian Fitz Count =

Anglo-Norman nobleman

Brian fitz Count (also Brian of Wallingford) was descended from the Breton ducal house, and became an Anglo-Norman noble, holding the lordships of Wallingford and Abergavenny. He was a loyal adherent of Henry I, King of England, and a staunch supporter of his daughter, the Empress Matilda, during the Anarchy (1135–1153).

Brian would go on to become one of the most notable knights to have sided with Empress Matilda and the Angevin faction. As a result, he is consistently mentioned in contemporary sources.

== Life ==
Brian fitz Count was an illegitimate son of Alan IV, Duke of Brittany, and thus the half-brother of Conan III, Duke of Brittany. He was sent to be raised at the court of King Henry I of England. (Note: Henry's patronage of Brian fitz Count, the illegitimate son of his brother-in-law Alan Fergent, could be seen as patronage to a nephew and his presence at court could be the result of having been sent there either out of friendship or a family relationship. Regardless, Brian fitz Count proved to be a loyal and valuable adherent to Henry I. See: Charlotte A. Newman, 'Family and Royal Favor in Henry I's England', Albion, Vol. 14, no. 3/4 (Autumn 1982), p. 301 & n. 27) He served Henry well at the Battle of Tinchebray in 1106 and elsewhere, winning the king's favour. Brian became a close friend of Robert, 1st Earl of Gloucester, Henry I's illegitimate son, and the two remained longstanding allies. In 1127 Brian and Robert were chosen by Henry to accompany his daughter, Empress Matilda, to Anjou during the negotiations for her marriage to Geoffrey Plantagenet, Count of Anjou.

The Gesta Stephani notes that Brian was a man of "distinguished birth and splendid position". As a Marcher Lord through the Barony of Abergavenny, Brian was reputedly concerned with the resurgence of Welsh hostility following the death of Henry I.

Brian married an English heiress, Matilda D'Oyly, widow of Miles Crispin, and through her obtained the Honour of Wallingford c. 1127. Brian also inherited the castle and Barony of Abergavenny in the Welsh Marches from his uncle, Hamelin de Balun. He held the honour of Grosmont Castle, but by what right is uncertain. He gave this to Walter de Hereford, the son of Miles de Gloucester, 1st Earl of Hereford about 1141. Brian held the honour of Wallingford by marriage, and his extensive estates in the counties of Berkshire and Wiltshire ran from the Chilterns to the Thames.

He supported Empress Matilda against King Stephen from 1139 on. Unlike the other Marcher Lords that followed Robert of Gloucester in swearing for Matilda in 1138, Brian only swore his support for Empress Matilda upon her arrival in England at Arundel in 1139. Although Stephen's forces repeatedly besieged Wallingford Castle, they failed to take the fortification and had to retreat as it had been reinforced by Brian. Wallingford Castle under Brian fitz Count was considered impregnable, not just because of the fortifications but also due to the large body of fighting men he had gathered together. (Note: A.L. Poole wrote of Brian: "Brian, a man of intelligence and education, was one of the better types of baron of the anarchy, a type more numerous perhaps than is usually supposed, whose honest purpose is lost sight of at a time when the majority of the class was making the very name of baron a byword for faithlessness, cruelty and lawlessness". See: K.S.B. Keats-Rohan, 'The Devolution of the Honour of Wallingford, 1066–1148', Oxoniensia Vol. 54 (1989), p. 315.) His castle of Wallingford was the easternmost point of the Angevin defences in the Thames valley and it held off King Stephen's forces for over thirteen years. Empress Matilda's nighttime escape from the siege of Oxford was to the safety of Wallingford Castle.

When Brian died is unknown. After his death, Matilda became a nun at Bec and died in the 1150s. As they had no heirs, their lands and castles in England and Wales reverted to the Crown early in the reign of Henry II of England.
