= Steeple Claydon =

Village in Buckinghamshire, England

Coordinates: 51.9365°N 0.9830°W

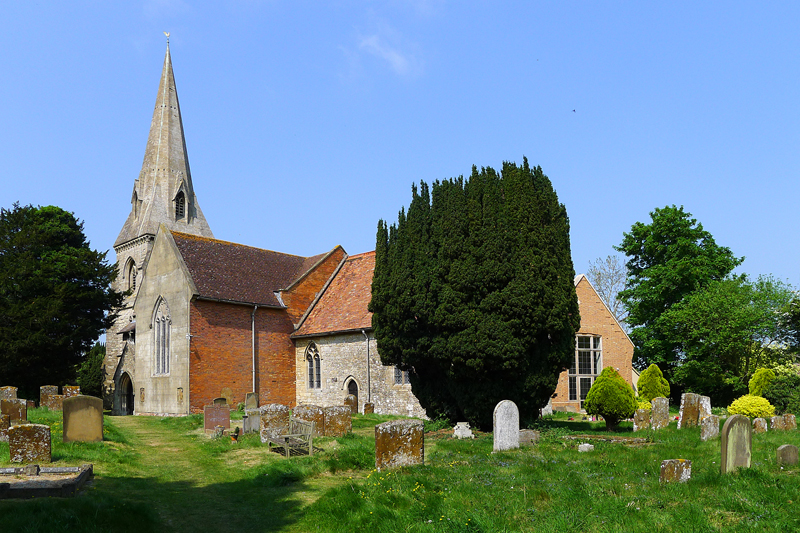
- St Michael's parish church

- Location within Buckinghamshire
- Population: 2,278 (2011 Census)
- OS grid reference: SP6927
- Civil parish: Steeple Claydon
- Unitary authority: Buckinghamshire
- Ceremonial county: Buckinghamshire
- Region: South East
- Country: England
- Sovereign state: United Kingdom
- Post town: Buckingham
- Postcode district: MK18
- Dialling code: 01296
- Police: Thames Valley
- Fire: Buckinghamshire
- Ambulance: South Central
- UK Parliament: Mid Buckinghamshire
- Website: Steeple Claydon Parish Council

Steeple Claydon is a village and civil parish in the Buckinghamshire district of the ceremonial county of Buckinghamshire, England. The village is about 4 miles (6.4 km) south of Buckingham, 4.5 miles (7 km) west of Winslow and 7 miles (11 km) northwest of Waddesdon. The 2011 Census recorded the parish population as 2,278.

== History ==
The toponym "Claydon" is derived from the Old English for "clay hill". The Domesday Book of 1086 records the area (including nearby Botolph Claydon, East Claydon and Middle Claydon) as Claindone. The affix "steeple" refers to the steeple of the Church of England parish church, which is prominent in the village. The manor of Steeple Claydon was once a royal possession. It was given as a wedding gift to Robert D'Oyly by King Henry I because D'Oyly was marrying one of the king's former mistresses. Later, after changing hands several times it came into the possession of King Edward IV when his grandfather the Earl of March left it to him. The manor house has since been pulled down. Thomas Chaloner, a regicide, had a school built in the village in 1656. This site was later made into the public library.

== Present day ==
Steeple Claydon is now one of the largest villages in Aylesbury Vale. It has a public house, a Co-op supermarket, a hairdresser, a fish & chips shop, a Chinese Takeaway, a dentist, a doctor's surgery and a garage. The village also has a successful football side, Steeple Claydon Football Club. The village has had some notable residents, including Florence Nightingale, Olympic swimmer Craig Gibbons, professional footballers Sam Baldock and George Baldock and Deep Purple founder member and guitarist Nick Simper.

The current Steeple Claydon School is a mixed, community primary school, with roughly 170 pupils ranging in age from four to eleven.

The HS2 Infrastructure Maintenance Depot is planned for Calvert, opening in 2029.
