= Robert D'Oyly =

Norman landowner, d. 1091

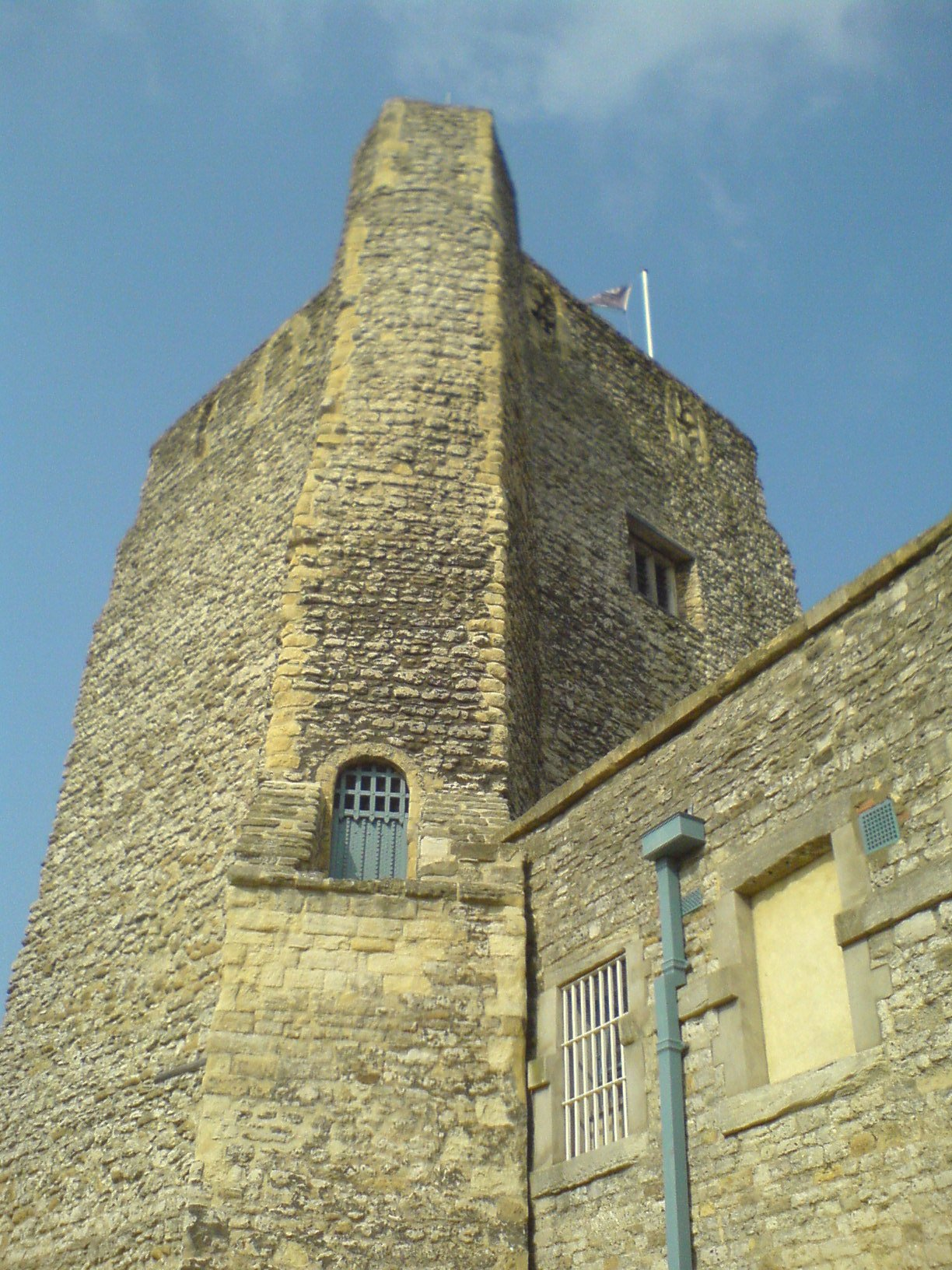
Oxford Castle, built under D’Oyly’s orders in 1071

Robert D'Oyly (also spelt Robert D'Oyley de Liseaux, Robert Doyley, Robert de Oiley, Robèrt d'Oilly, Robert D'Oyley and Roberti De Oilgi) was a Norman nobleman who accompanied William the Conqueror on the Norman conquest, his invasion of England. He died in 1091.

== Background ==
Robert was the son of Walter D'Oyly and elder brother to Nigel D'Oyly. D'Oyly is a Norman French name, from the place name Ouilly near Lisieux in pays d'Auge, present Calvados département in Normandy. He married Ealdgyth, the daughter of Wigod, the Saxon lord of Wallingford. After Wigod's death, William appointed Robert the lord of Wallingford, and ordered him to fortify Wallingford Castle between 1067 and 1071. It is believed he may have become the third High Sheriff of Berkshire around this time. He was made Baron Hocknorton.

D'Oyly was a sworn brother-in-arms of Roger d'Ivry. The Domesday Book records that by 1086 D'Oyly and d'Ivry held a number of manors either partitioned between the two of them or administered in common.

His brother Nigel's son was Robert Doyley, the founder of Osney Priory, Oxford. Nigel was also an ancestor of Henry D'Oyly, one of the major feudal barons of Magna Carta.

"He was so powerful a man in his time, that no one durst oppose him", says one account. At Abingdon he was remembered as "a despoiler of churches and the poor until his miraculous conversion [to Christianity]". The latter was during the economic decline that Oxford experienced between 1066 and 1086; however, it is noted that Robert's own properties suffered as much waste in this period.

== Legacy ==
Robert was appointed High Sheriff of Oxfordshire and ordered the construction of multiple parts of Oxford, some of which still survive today. Oxford Castle was built under Robert's orders in 1071, and the collegiate church of St George's within the castle was founded by Robert in 1074. The church of St Peter-in-the-East was first mentioned in 1086 as a possession of Robert's although it is possible that he merely acquired it, along with St Mary Magdalen's Church, north of the former gate of Oxford's medieval wall.

The monks of Abingdon credited him with the construction of a series of stone bridges at Grandpont ("The Great Bridge"), which form a causeway over the River Thames. This now forms the major route between the city centre and the south, and the crossing point is near St Aldate's over Folly Bridge. It is possible, however, that he merely fortified an older crossing point. Works on the Thames channel at the present-day Eights Reach have also been attributed to Robert D'Oyly.

== Possessions ==
Robert owned land in Oakley, Buckinghamshire. The village was valued at £6, and its land consisted of 5¾ hides. With Oakley's clay soil the total cultivated land would have been around 550 acres (220 ha). Robert, also, held a tenure (or burgage) in Buckingham held by a man of Azor, the son of Tote, who paid sixteen pence annually and to the king, five pence.

The Manor of Iver became part of the possessions of Robert D'Oyly, who held Eureham (as Iver was called in the Domesday Book), for seventeen hides. The land was enough for thirty ploughs. It was estimated at £22, it had been exchanged for Padbury, with Robert Clarenbold of the Marsh. D'Oyly's daughter Maud married Miles Crispin, to whom the Manor of Iver descended.

D'Oyly also owned a considerable amount of land in Oxfordshire and in Oxford itself recorded in the Domesday Book of 1086:

- Oxford Castle, and the collegiate church of St George's within the castle, that was later acquired by Osney Abbey
- The Castle Mill in Oxford. This belonged to Ælfgar of Mercia before the Conquest and was escheated to the Crown in 1163 following the death of Henry D'Oyly.
- The church of St Peter-in-the-East in Oxford, that now forms part of St Edmund Hall
- The church of St Mary Magdalen
- 42 dwellings both within and without the city wall of Oxford
- The settlements of Watlington, Goring, Bicester, Kidlington, Water Eaton and three manors in Hook Norton
- Land and dwellings in a further 22 Oxfordshire villages

== Family ==
With his wife Ealdgyth he had a daughter and heiress Maud who first married Miles Crispin (d. 1107), Lord of Wallingford, and afterwards Brien FitzCount, lord of Burgavennu (the faithful ally of the Empress Matilda), but leaving no issue, was succeeded by Nigel D'Oyly, her uncle, who was constable to William Rufus and Baron of Hocknorton. Robert and Ealdgyth were buried in the abbey in Abingdon.
