= Wigod =

Anglo-Saxon thegn

- Children: Toki; Aldgytha
- Relatives: Robert D'Oyly son-in-law; Matilda D'Oyly granddaughter

Wigod (also spelt Wigot) was the eleventh-century Saxon thegn or lord of the English town of Wallingford, and a kinsman of Edward the Confessor.

He had seventeen manors, but they were scattered between eight counties. At a time when it was normal for clusters of estates to be built together, this suggests that they were given by King Edward and had only recently been increased in size.

After the Battle of Hastings, during the 1066 Norman invasion of England, William the Conqueror made for London, but was repulsed at the River Thames. Wigod invited William to Wallingford where he then crossed the river, aiding him in his conquest of England. The Domesday Book records him as both a Lord and an Overlord in a number of places in 1066.

His daughter Ealdgyth (also known as Aldgytha) married Robert D'Oyly, one of William's lords. He became lord of Wallingford upon Wigod's death. Wigod's son, Toki, also known as Tokig or Toking, died in battle supporting William the Conqueror.
