= Miles Crispin =

Norman landowner

Miles Crispin (died 1107), also known as Miles or Milo of Wallingford, was a wealthy Norman landowner, particularly associated with Wallingford Castle in Berkshire. The Domesday Book records Miles as a major landowner with holdings in Berkshire, Buckinghamshire, Oxfordshire, Surrey, Wiltshire and two other neighbouring counties as well as being Tenant-in-chief in a lengthy list of places.

Miles is believed to be a member of the Crispin family of Neaufles in Normandy: suggestions include son of William Crispin, baron of Neaufles (Neaufles-Saint-Martin or Neaufles-Auvergny), part of William the Conqueror's invading force, and a relation of Gilbert Crispin, abbot of Westminster, but this is uncertain.

Miles married Matilda, daughter of Robert D'Oyly, in 1084. While D'Oyly is generally credited with building Wallingford Castle, it has also been suggested that Miles Crispin was its first castellan of Wallingford, and owner of the lands of Wigod. Matilda later married Brien FitzCount.

During the Rebellion of 1088, Miles Crispin was a supporter of William II, and was in the army that later arrested William de Saint-Calais.
