= List of United Kingdom locations: Mo-Mor =

The United Kingdom

This is part of the list of United Kingdom locations: a gazetteer of place names in the United Kingdom showing each place's locality and geographical coordinates.

== Moa-Mol ==
Location	Locality	Coordinates (links to map & photo sources)	OS grid reference
Moarfield	Shetland Islands	60.70°N 01.03°W	HP5303
Moat	Cumbria	55.04°N 02.92°W	NY4173
Moatmill	Angus	56.51°N 02.97°W	NO4036
Moats Tye	Suffolk	52.15°N 00.98°E	TM0455
Mobberley	Cheshire	53.30°N 02.33°W	SJ7879
Mobberley	Staffordshire	52.96°N 02.00°W	SK0041
Moblake	Cheshire	52.98°N 02.49°W	SJ6743
Mobwell	Buckinghamshire	51.70°N 00.71°W	SP8901
Moccas	Herefordshire	52.07°N 02.94°W	SO3542
Mochdre	Conwy	53.28°N 03.77°W	SH8278
Mochdre	Powys	52.48°N 03.37°W	SO0788
Mochrum	Dumfries and Galloway	54.78°N 04.58°W	NX3446
Mockbeggar	Hampshire	50.88°N 01.77°W	SU1609
Mockbeggar (Frindsbury Extra)	Kent	51.42°N 00.48°E	TQ7372
Mockbeggar (Lyminge)	Kent	51.14°N 01.05°E	TR1443
Mockbeggar (Swale)	Kent	51.32°N 00.83°E	TQ9736
Mockerkin	Cumbria	54.59°N 03.41°W	NY0923
Modbury	Devon	50.34°N 03.89°W	SX6551
Moddershall	Staffordshire	52.92°N 02.12°W	SJ9236
Model Village	Derbyshire	53.25°N 01.22°W	SK5273
Modest Corner	Kent	51.15°N 00.24°E	TQ5742
Modsary	Highland	58.51°N 04.31°W	NC6561
Moelfre	Conwy	53.25°N 03.57°W	SH9574
Moelfre	Isle of Anglesey	53.35°N 04.24°W	SH5186
Moelfre	Powys	52.84°N 03.21°W	SJ1828
Moel Tryfan	Gwynedd	53.08°N 04.22°W	SH5156
Moel-y-crio	Flintshire	53.21°N 03.21°W	SJ1969
Moffat	Dumfries and Galloway	55.33°N 03.45°W	NT0805
Moffat Mills	North Lanarkshire	55.85°N 03.93°W	NS7964
Mogador	Surrey	51.25°N 00.23°W	TQ2352
Moggerhanger	Bedfordshire	52.12°N 00.33°W	TL1449
Mogworthy	Devon	50.94°N 03.63°W	SS8517
Moidart	Highland	56.79°N 05.67°W	NM756726
Moira	Leicestershire	52.73°N 01.54°W	SK3115
Moity	Powys	52.07°N 03.19°W	SO1842
Molash	Kent	51.22°N 00.89°E	TR0251
Mol-chlach	Highland	57.13°N 06.21°W	NG4513
Mold (Yr Wyddgrug)	Flintshire	53.15°N 03.15°W	SJ2363
Moldgreen	Kirklees	53.64°N 01.77°W	SE1516
Molehill Green (Felsted)	Essex	51.85°N 00.48°E	TL7120
Molehill Green (Takeley)	Essex	51.89°N 00.26°E	TL5624
Molescroft	East Riding of Yorkshire	53.84°N 00.45°W	TA0240
Molesden	Northumberland	55.15°N 01.78°W	NZ1484
Molesworth	Cambridgeshire	52.36°N 00.42°W	TL0775
Molinnis	Cornwall	50.39°N 04.80°W	SX0159
Moll	Highland	57.29°N 06.05°W	NG5630
Molland	Devon	51.03°N 03.71°W	SS8028
Mollington	Cheshire	53.22°N 02.93°W	SJ3870
Mollington	Oxfordshire	52.11°N 01.35°W	SP4447
Mollinsburn	North Lanarkshire	55.91°N 04.06°W	NS7171

== Mon ==
Location	Locality	Coordinates (links to map & photo sources)	OS grid reference
Monach Islands (Heisker)	Western Isles	57.52°N 07.61°W	NF639618
Monaughty	Powys	52.30°N 03.13°W	SO2368
Monboddo	Aberdeenshire	56.89°N 02.42°W	NO7478
Moncreiffe	Perth and Kinross	56.37°N 03.44°W	NO1121
Mondaytown	Shropshire	52.65°N 02.97°W	SJ3407
Monemore	Stirling	56.45°N 04.33°W	NN5632
Monewden	Suffolk	52.17°N 01.26°E	TM2358
Moneyacres	East Ayrshire	55.71°N 04.51°W	NS4250
Moneydie	Perth and Kinross	56.44°N 03.52°W	NO0629
Money Head	Dumfries and Galloway	54.79°N 05.03°W	NX053486
Moneyhill	Hertfordshire	51.63°N 00.49°W	TQ0494
Money Hill	Leicestershire	52.74°N 01.48°W	SK3517
Moneyrow Green	Berkshire	51.48°N 00.71°W	SU8977
Moneystone	Staffordshire	53.01°N 01.92°W	SK0546
Mongleath	Cornwall	50.14°N 05.10°W	SW7832
Moniaive	Dumfries and Galloway	55.18°N 03.93°W	NX7790
Monifieth	Angus	56.47°N 02.82°W	NO4932
Monikie	Angus	56.53°N 02.83°W	NO4938
Monimail	Fife	56.31°N 03.14°W	NO2914
Monington	Pembrokeshire	52.05°N 04.72°W	SN1343
Monk Bretton	Barnsley	53.55°N 01.45°W	SE3607
Monk End	North Yorkshire	54.47°N 01.56°W	NZ2809
Monken Hadley	Barnet	51.65°N 00.20°W	TQ2497
Monkerton	Devon	50.72°N 03.47°W	SX9693
Monk Fryston	North Yorkshire	53.75°N 01.24°W	SE5029
Monk Hesleden	Durham	54.72°N 01.30°W	NZ4537
Monkhide	Herefordshire	52.08°N 02.57°W	SO6143
Monkhill	Cumbria	54.91°N 03.03°W	NY3458
Monkhill	Wakefield	53.69°N 01.31°W	SE4522
Monkhopton	Shropshire	52.53°N 02.56°W	SO6293
Monkland	Herefordshire	52.20°N 02.80°W	SO4557
Monkleigh	Devon	50.95°N 04.20°W	SS4520
Monkmoor	Shropshire	52.71°N 02.72°W	SJ5113
Monknash	The Vale of Glamorgan	51.41°N 03.56°W	SS9170
Monkokehampton	Devon	50.82°N 04.01°W	SS5805
Monkscross	Cornwall	50.51°N 04.28°W	SX3871
Monkseaton	North Tyneside	55.04°N 01.46°W	NZ3472
Monks Eleigh	Suffolk	52.08°N 00.85°E	TL9647
Monk's Gate	West Sussex	51.03°N 00.28°W	TQ2027
Monks' Heath	Cheshire	53.26°N 02.24°W	SJ8474
Monk Sherborne	Hampshire	51.30°N 01.14°W	SU6056
Monk's Hill	Kent	51.13°N 00.65°E	TQ8641
Monkshill	Aberdeenshire	57.45°N 02.35°W	NJ7940
Monksilver	Somerset	51.12°N 03.33°W	ST0737
Monks Kirby	Warwickshire	52.44°N 01.32°W	SP4683
Monk Soham	Suffolk	52.23°N 01.23°E	TM2165
Monks Orchard	Croydon	51.38°N 00.06°W	TQ3567
Monk's Park	Wiltshire	51.41°N 02.18°W	ST8768
Monkspath	Solihull	52.38°N 01.79°W	SP1476
Monks Risborough	Buckinghamshire	51.72°N 00.84°W	SP8004
Monksthorpe	Lincolnshire	53.16°N 00.15°E	TF4465
Monkstone Point	Pembrokeshire	51.69°N 04.68°W	SN143031
Monkston Park	Milton Keynes	52.03°N 00.71°W	SP8838
Monkstown	Fife	56.26°N 03.13°W	NO3009
Monk Street	Essex	51.92°N 00.34°E	TL6128
Monkswood	Leeds	53.82°N 01.48°W	SE3437
Monkswood	Midlothian	55.85°N 03.07°W	NT3363
Monkswood	Monmouthshire	51.71°N 02.95°W	SO3402
Monkton	Devon	50.82°N 03.16°W	ST1803
Monkton	Kent	51.33°N 01.27°E	TR2865
Monkton	Pembrokeshire	51.67°N 04.93°W	SM9701
Monkton	South Ayrshire	55.50°N 04.61°W	NS3527
Monkton	South Tyneside	54.96°N 01.50°W	NZ3263
Monkton	Vale of Glamorgan	51.42°N 03.55°W	SS9271
Monkton Combe	Bath and North East Somerset	51.35°N 02.33°W	ST7762
Monkton Deverill	Wiltshire	51.13°N 02.21°W	ST8537
Monkton Farleigh	Wiltshire	51.38°N 02.28°W	ST8065
Monktonhall	East Lothian	55.92°N 03.05°W	NT3471
Monkton Heathfield	Somerset	51.02°N 03.07°W	ST2526
Monkton Up Wimborne	Dorset	50.91°N 01.98°W	SU0113
Monkton Wyld	Dorset	50.75°N 02.95°W	SY3396
Monkwearmouth	Sunderland	54.91°N 01.39°W	NZ3958
Monkwood	Dorset	50.77°N 02.82°W	SY4298
Monkwood	Hampshire	51.06°N 01.05°W	SU6630
Monkwood Green	Worcestershire	52.23°N 02.29°W	SO8060
Monmarsh	Herefordshire	52.13°N 02.70°W	SO5249
Monmore Green	Wolverhampton	52.57°N 02.10°W	SO9397
Monmouth (Trefynwy)	Monmouthshire	51.80°N 02.72°W	SO5012
Monmouth Cap	Herefordshire	51.92°N 02.88°W	SO3926
Monnington on Wye	Herefordshire	52.08°N 02.92°W	SO3743
Monreith	Dumfries and Galloway	54.73°N 04.54°W	NX3641
Montacute	Somerset	50.94°N 02.72°W	ST4916
Montcliffe	Bolton	53.60°N 02.53°W	SD6512
Montford	Argyll and Bute	55.83°N 05.03°W	NS1064
Montford	Shropshire	52.72°N 02.87°W	SJ4114
Montford Bridge	Shropshire	52.72°N 02.84°W	SJ4315
Montgarrie	Aberdeenshire	57.24°N 02.71°W	NJ5717
Montgomery	Powys	52.55°N 03.15°W	SO2296
Montgomery Lines	Hampshire	51.25°N 00.76°W	SU8651
Monton	Salford	53.48°N 02.36°W	SJ7699
Montpelier	City of Bristol	51.46°N 02.59°W	ST5974
Montrose	Angus	56.70°N 02.47°W	NO7157
Montsale	Essex	51.63°N 00.88°E	TR0097
Monwode Lea	Warwickshire	52.51°N 01.61°W	SP2691
Monxton	Hampshire	51.19°N 01.55°W	SU3144
Monyash	Derbyshire	53.19°N 01.77°W	SK1566
Monymusk	Aberdeenshire	57.22°N 02.53°W	NJ6815
Monzie	Perth and Kinross	56.40°N 03.83°W	NN8725

== Moo ==
Location	Locality	Coordinates (links to map & photo sources)	OS grid reference
Mooa	Shetland Islands	60.36°N 00.90°W	HU607649
Moodiesburn	North Lanarkshire	55.90°N 04.11°W	NS6870
Moolham	Somerset	50.91°N 02.91°W	ST3613
Moon's Green	Kent	51.01°N 00.67°E	TQ8827
Moon's Moat	Worcestershire	52.31°N 01.89°W	SP0768
Moonzie	Fife	56.34°N 03.08°W	NO3317
Moor	Somerset	50.94°N 02.82°W	ST4216
Moor Allerton	Leeds	53.84°N 01.54°W	SE3039
Mooray	Wiltshire	51.08°N 02.04°W	ST9732
Moorbath	Dorset	50.75°N 02.80°W	SY4395
Moorby	Lincolnshire	53.15°N 00.07°W	TF2964
Moorclose	Cumbria	54.62°N 03.56°W	NX9927
Moorclose	Rochdale	53.54°N 02.18°W	SD8805
Moor Common	Buckinghamshire	51.60°N 00.84°W	SU8090
Moorcot	Herefordshire	52.18°N 02.95°W	SO3555
Moor Crichel	Dorset	50.87°N 02.01°W	ST9908
Moor Cross	Devon	50.40°N 03.95°W	SX6158
Moordown	Bournemouth	50.74°N 01.87°W	SZ0994
Moore	Cheshire	53.35°N 02.63°W	SJ5884
Moor Edge	Bradford	53.83°N 01.87°W	SE0838
Moor End	Barnsley	53.53°N 01.56°W	SE2904
Moor End (Eaton Bray)	Buckinghamshire	51.87°N 00.59°W	SP9720
Moor End (Lane End)	Buckinghamshire	51.60°N 00.84°W	SU8090
Moor End	Calderdale	53.74°N 01.92°W	SE0528
Moor End	Cambridgeshire	52.10°N 00.01°E	TL3847
Moor End	Durham	54.78°N 01.53°W	NZ3043
Moor End	East Riding of Yorkshire	53.82°N 00.77°W	SE8137
Moor End	Gloucestershire	51.87°N 02.05°W	SO9620
Moor End	Lancashire	53.88°N 02.96°W	SD3744
Moor End	Leeds	53.89°N 01.37°W	SE4145
Moor End (Staveley)	North Yorkshire	54.05°N 01.45°W	SE3662
Moor End (Kelfield)	North Yorkshire	53.83°N 01.10°W	SE5938
Moor End	Worcestershire	52.20°N 02.14°W	SO9056
Moor End (Stockton-on-the-Forest)	York	53.99°N 00.99°W	SE6656
Moorend	Cumbria	54.84°N 03.06°W	NY3250
Moorend	Derbyshire	53.00°N 01.68°W	SK2145
Moorend	Dumfries and Galloway	55.01°N 03.17°W	NY2570
Moorend (Upton St Leonards)	Gloucestershire	51.81°N 02.20°W	SO8613
Moorend (Slimbridge)	Gloucestershire	51.71°N 02.39°W	SO7302
Moorend	South Gloucestershire	51.50°N 02.50°W	ST6578
Moorend	Stockport	53.38°N 02.01°W	SJ9988
Moorend Cross	Herefordshire	52.10°N 02.41°W	SO7245
Moor End Field	North Yorkshire	54.11°N 01.32°W	SE4469
Moorends	Doncaster	53.62°N 00.95°W	SE6915
Moorfield	Derbyshire	53.42°N 01.94°W	SK0492
Moorgate	Norfolk	52.82°N 01.21°E	TG1730
Moorgate	Rotherham	53.40°N 01.33°W	SK4490
Moor Green	Birmingham	52.43°N 01.91°W	SP0682
Moor Green	Hertfordshire	51.91°N 00.08°W	TL3226
Moor Green	Staffordshire	52.96°N 02.06°W	SJ9641
Moor Green	Wiltshire	51.41°N 02.21°W	ST8568
Moorgreen	Hampshire	50.93°N 01.33°W	SU4715
Moorgreen	Nottinghamshire	53.01°N 01.28°W	SK4847
Moorhaigh	Nottinghamshire	53.16°N 01.25°W	SK5063
Moor Hall	Birmingham	52.58°N 01.82°W	SP1298
Moorhall	Derbyshire	53.26°N 01.55°W	SK3074
Moorhampton	Herefordshire	52.10°N 02.90°W	SO3846
Moorhaven Village	Devon	50.40°N 03.88°W	SX6657
Moorhayne	Devon	50.85°N 03.08°W	ST2407
Moorhead	Bradford	53.82°N 01.80°W	SE1337
Moor Head	Kirklees	53.60°N 01.66°W	SE2212
Moor Head	Leeds	53.75°N 01.63°W	SE2429
Moorhey	Oldham	53.53°N 02.10°W	SD9304
Moorhole	Sheffield	53.33°N 01.38°W	SK4182
Moorhouse (Burgh by Sands)	Cumbria	54.89°N 03.04°W	NY3356
Moorhouse (Allerdale)	Cumbria	54.84°N 03.16°W	NY2551
Moorhouse	Doncaster	53.58°N 01.27°W	SE4810
Moorhouse	Nottinghamshire	53.18°N 00.87°W	SK7566
Moorhouse Bank	Surrey	51.25°N 00.03°E	TQ4253
Moorhouses	Lincolnshire	53.08°N 00.10°W	TF2756
Moorland (or Northmoor Green)	Somerset	51.08°N 02.95°W	ST3332
Moorledge	Bath and North East Somerset	51.35°N 02.60°W	ST5862
Moorlinch	Somerset	51.12°N 02.87°W	ST3936
Moor Monkton	North Yorkshire	53.99°N 01.23°W	SE5056
Moor Monkton Moor	North Yorkshire	53.98°N 01.22°W	SE5155
Moor of Granary	Moray	57.57°N 03.55°W	NJ0755
Moor Park	Cumbria	54.72°N 03.46°W	NY0638
Moor Park	Herefordshire	52.05°N 02.74°W	SO4940
Moor Park	Hertfordshire	51.62°N 00.44°W	TQ0893
Moor Park	Surrey	51.20°N 00.77°W	SU8646
Moor Row (Dundraw)	Cumbria	54.83°N 03.23°W	NY2149
Moor Row (Egremont)	Cumbria	54.51°N 03.54°W	NY0014
Moorsholm	Redcar and Cleveland	54.51°N 00.95°W	NZ6814
Moorside	Cheshire	53.28°N 03.08°W	SJ2877
Moorside	Dorset	50.97°N 02.30°W	ST7919
Moorside	Durham	54.83°N 01.87°W	NZ0849
Moorside	Kirklees	53.74°N 01.66°W	SE2228
Moorside	Leeds	53.81°N 01.63°W	SE2435
Moorside	Oldham	53.56°N 02.07°W	SD9507
Moorside	Salford	53.50°N 02.34°W	SD7701
Moor Side (Oxenhope)	Bradford	53.81°N 01.97°W	SE0235
Moor Side (Bradford)	Bradford	53.74°N 01.77°W	SE1528
Moor Side	Lancashire	53.79°N 02.86°W	SD4334
Moor Side (Fylde)	Lancashire	53.80°N 02.77°W	SD4935
Moor Side (Preston)	Lincolnshire	53.09°N 00.14°W	TF2457
Moorstock	Kent	51.10°N 00.99°E	TR1038
Moor Street	Kent	51.35°N 00.61°E	TQ8265
Moorswater	Cornwall	50.44°N 04.49°W	SX2364
Moorthorpe	Wakefield	53.59°N 01.30°W	SE4611
Moor Top	Kirklees	53.68°N 01.71°W	SE1921
Moortown (Great Torrington)	Devon	50.96°N 04.12°W	SS5120
Moortown (Tetcott)	Devon	50.73°N 04.36°W	SX3396
Moortown (Whitchurch, West Devon)	Devon	50.53°N 04.09°W	SX5273
Moortown	Hampshire	50.83°N 01.78°W	SU1504
Moortown	Isle of Wight	50.64°N 01.40°W	SZ4283
Moortown	Leeds	53.83°N 01.54°W	SE3038
Moortown	Lincolnshire	53.47°N 00.38°W	TF0799
Moortown	Shropshire	52.75°N 02.57°W	SJ6118

== Mor ==
Location	Locality	Coordinates (links to map & photo sources)	OS grid reference
Morangie	Highland	57.82°N 04.08°W	NH7683
Morar / Mòrar	Highland	56.96°N 05.83°W	NM6793
Moravian Settlement	Derbyshire	52.91°N 01.37°W	SK4235
Morawelon / Môrawelon	Isle of Anglesey	53.30°N 04.62°W	SH2582
Morborne	Cambridgeshire	52.50°N 00.33°W	TL1391
Morchard Bishop	Devon	50.84°N 03.76°W	SS7607
Morchard Road	Devon	50.82°N 03.77°W	SS7504
Morcombelake	Dorset	50.74°N 02.86°W	SY3994
Morcott	Rutland	52.59°N 00.64°W	SK9200
Morda	Shropshire	52.83°N 03.07°W	SJ2827
Morden	Dorset	50.75°N 02.12°W	SY9195
Morden	Merton	51.39°N 00.20°W	TQ2568
Morden Green	Cambridgeshire	52.06°N 00.11°W	TL2942
Morden Park	Sutton	51.37°N 00.23°W	TQ2366
Mordiford	Herefordshire	52.03°N 02.62°W	SO5737
Mordington Holdings	Scottish Borders	55.79°N 02.09°W	NT9456
Mordon	Durham	54.62°N 01.50°W	NZ3226
More	Shropshire	52.51°N 02.97°W	SO3491
Morebath	Devon	51.00°N 03.49°W	SS9524
Morebattle	Scottish Borders	55.50°N 02.36°W	NT7724
Morecambe	Lancashire	54.06°N 02.88°W	SD4263
Moredon	Swindon	51.58°N 01.81°W	SU1387
Moredun	City of Edinburgh	55.90°N 03.13°W	NT2969
Morefield	Highland	57.90°N 05.19°W	NH1195
Morehall	Kent	51.08°N 01.13°E	TR2036
Moreleigh	Devon	50.35°N 03.74°W	SX7652
Moresby Parks	Cumbria	54.55°N 03.56°W	NX9919
Morestead	Hampshire	51.02°N 01.28°W	SU5025
Moreton	Dorset	50.70°N 02.28°W	SY8089
Moreton	East Staffordshire	52.85°N 01.79°W	SK1429
Moreton	Essex	51.74°N 00.21°E	TL5307
Moreton	Herefordshire	52.27°N 02.73°W	SO5064
Moreton (Northmoor)	Oxfordshire	51.70°N 01.40°W	SP4101
Moreton (Thame)	Oxfordshire	51.73°N 01.00°W	SP6904
Moreton	Staffordshire	52.75°N 02.31°W	SJ7917
Moreton	Wirral	53.40°N 03.11°W	SJ2690
Moreton Corbet	Shropshire	52.80°N 02.66°W	SJ5523
Moretonhampstead	Devon	50.66°N 03.77°W	SX7586
Moreton-in-Marsh	Gloucestershire	51.98°N 01.71°W	SP2032
Moreton Jeffries	Herefordshire	52.12°N 02.58°W	SO6048
Moreton Morrell	Warwickshire	52.20°N 01.54°W	SP3156
Moreton on Lugg	Herefordshire	52.10°N 02.73°W	SO5045
Moreton Paddox	Warwickshire	52.18°N 01.56°W	SP3054
Moreton Pinkney	Northamptonshire	52.13°N 01.16°W	SP5749
Moreton Say	Shropshire	52.90°N 02.56°W	SJ6234
Moreton Valence	Gloucestershire	51.77°N 02.32°W	SO7809
Moretonwood	Shropshire	52.90°N 02.56°W	SJ6234
Morfa (Llandybie, near Cross Hands)	Carmarthenshire	51.78°N 04.07°W	SN5712
Morfa (Llanelli)	Carmarthenshire	51.66°N 04.15°W	SS5198
Morfa	Ceredigion	52.14°N 04.48°W	SN3052
Morfa	Gwynedd	52.86°N 04.69°W	SH1933
Morfa Bach	Carmarthenshire	51.79°N 04.37°W	SN3613
Morfa Bychan	Gwynedd	52.91°N 04.17°W	SH5437
Morfa Glas	Neath Port Talbot	51.74°N 03.63°W	SN8706
Morfa Nefyn	Gwynedd	52.93°N 04.56°W	SH2840
Morfydd	Denbighshire	52.99°N 03.32°W	SJ1145
Morganstown	Cardiff	51.52°N 03.26°W	ST1281
Morgan's Vale	Wiltshire	50.98°N 01.73°W	SU1921
Moriah	Ceredigion	52.39°N 04.02°W	SN6279
Mork	Gloucestershire	51.74°N 02.65°W	SO5505
Morland	Cumbria	54.59°N 02.63°W	NY5922
Morley	Cheshire	53.33°N 02.27°W	SJ8282
Morley	Derbyshire	52.95°N 01.42°W	SK3940
Morley	Durham	54.63°N 01.81°W	NZ1227
Morley	Leeds	53.73°N 01.60°W	SE2627
Morley Green	Cheshire	53.33°N 02.27°W	SJ8282
Morleymoor	Derbyshire	52.96°N 01.43°W	SK3841
Morley Park	Derbyshire	53.02°N 01.43°W	SK3848
Morley Smithy	Derbyshire	52.96°N 01.42°W	SK3941
Morley St Botolph	Norfolk	52.54°N 01.05°E	TM0799
Mornick	Cornwall	50.52°N 04.38°W	SX3172
Morningside	City of Edinburgh	55.92°N 03.21°W	NT2471
Morningside	North Lanarkshire	55.77°N 03.86°W	NS8355
Morningthorpe	Norfolk	52.48°N 01.25°E	TM2192
Morpeth	Northumberland	55.15°N 01.68°W	NZ2085
Morrey	Staffordshire	52.75°N 01.82°W	SK1218
Morridge Side	Staffordshire	53.08°N 01.97°W	SK0254
Morrilow Heath	Staffordshire	52.91°N 02.03°W	SJ9835
Morriston	Swansea	51.66°N 03.93°W	SS6698
Morristown	The Vale of Glamorgan	51.42°N 03.19°W	ST1770
Morston	Norfolk	52.94°N 00.97°E	TG0043
Mortehoe	Devon	51.18°N 04.21°W	SS4545
Morte Point	Devon	51.18°N 04.22°W	SS449452
Morthen	Rotherham	53.39°N 01.29°W	SK4789
Mortimer	Hampshire	51.37°N 01.06°W	SU6564
Mortimer's Cross	Herefordshire	52.26°N 02.85°W	SO4263
Mortimer West End	Hampshire	51.36°N 01.09°W	SU6363
Mortlake	Richmond Upon Thames	51.46°N 00.27°W	TQ2075
Mortomley	Sheffield	53.46°N 01.48°W	SK3497
Morton (Cumberland)	Cumbria	54.87°N 02.96°W	NY3854
Morton (Westmorland and Furness)	Cumbria	54.74°N 02.87°W	NY4439
Morton	Derbyshire	53.13°N 01.40°W	SK4060
Morton	Isle of Wight	50.67°N 01.15°W	SZ6086
Morton (Swinderby)	Lincolnshire	53.15°N 00.68°W	SK8863
Morton (Morton by Bourne)	Lincolnshire	52.80°N 00.38°W	TF0924
Morton (Morton by Gainsborough)	Lincolnshire	53.41°N 00.79°W	SK8091
Morton (Morton on the Hill)	Norfolk	52.70°N 01.13°E	TG1217
Morton	Nottinghamshire	53.05°N 00.92°W	SK7251
Morton	Shropshire	52.80°N 03.05°W	SJ2924
Morton	South Gloucestershire	51.60°N 02.52°W	ST6490
Morton Bagot	Warwickshire	52.27°N 01.84°W	SP1164
Morton Common	Shropshire	52.80°N 03.05°W	SJ2924
Morton Mains (near Morton Castle)	Dumfries and Galloway	55.27°N 03.76°W	NX8899
Morton Mill	Shropshire	52.79°N 02.63°W	SJ5722
Morton-on-Swale	North Yorkshire	54.31°N 01.50°W	SE3291
Morton Spirt	Worcestershire	52.18°N 01.94°W	SP0454
Morton Tinmouth	Durham	54.58°N 01.72°W	NZ1821
Morton under Hill	Worcestershire	52.22°N 01.98°W	SP0159
Morvah	Cornwall	50.15°N 05.64°W	SW4035
Morval	Cornwall	50.37°N 04.44°W	SX2656
Morvil	Pembrokeshire	51.94°N 04.86°W	SN0330
Morville	Shropshire	52.54°N 02.50°W	SO6694
Morville Heath	Shropshire	52.53°N 02.47°W	SO6893
Morwellham Quay	Cornwall	50.50°N 04.20°W	SX4469
Morwenstow	Cornwall	50.90°N 04.56°W	SS2015
