= Moreton =

Moreton may refer to:

== People ==
=== Given name ===
- Moreton John Wheatley (1837–1916), British Army officer and Bailiff of the Royal Parks

=== Surname ===
- Alice Bertha Moreton (1901–1977), English sculptor, draughtsman and artist
- Andrew Moreton, a pseudonym of Daniel Defoe
- Arabella Moreton (after 1690–1727), British poet
- Berkeley Moreton, 4th Earl of Ducie (1834–1924), British peer
- Marie Evelyn Moreton (1870–1949), Lady Byng
- Ivor Moreton (1908–1984), British singer and pianist
- Jimmy Moreton (1891–1942), English football player and manager
- John Moreton (1917–2012), British diplomat
- John Alfred Moreton, Royal Navy officer during the First World War
- Julian Moreton (1825–1900), Anglican missionary
- Kevin Moreton (born 1959), English actor
- Matthew Moreton, 1st Baron Ducie (1663–1735), British Army officer and politician
- Nicolas Moreton (born 1961), English artist
- Penelope Moreton (born 1932), Irish equestrian
- Ray Moreton (1942–2016), New Zealand rugby union player
- Robert Moreton (1922–1957), English comedian and actor born Henry Moreton
- Samuel Horatio Moreton (1843–1921), New Zealand artist, and explorer
- Stephen Moreton (born 1984), Irish cricketer
- Ursula Moreton (1903–1973), English ballerina and teacher
- Will Moreton (born 1997), American basketball player
- William Moreton (1641–1715), English prelate in the Church of Ireland
- William Moreton (c. 1696–1763), English judge and politician

== Places ==
=== Antarctica ===
- Moreton Point, South Orkney Islands

=== Australia ===
- Division of Moreton, an electoral district in the Australian House of Representatives, in Queensland
- Moreton Bay, a large bay near Brisbane, Queensland
  - Moreton Island, a large island within the bay
  - Cape Moreton, a rocky headland on the north eastern tip of Moreton Island
- City of Moreton Bay, a local government area in South East Queensland, formerly known as Moreton Bay Region
- West Moreton, a statistical region of the state of Queensland, consisting of the entire rural western portion of South East Queensland

=== Greenland ===
- Moreton station, a Norwegian hunting, meteorological and radio station in Southeastern Greenland

=== United Kingdom ===
- Moreton, Dorset
- Moreton, Essex
- Moreton, Herefordshire, north of Leominster
- Moreton, Oxfordshire:
  - North Moreton
  - South Moreton
  - Moreton, South Oxfordshire, near Thame
- Moreton, Merseyside
- Moreton, Staffordshire
- Moreton Corbet, Shropshire
- Moreton Jeffries, Herefordshire
- Moreton Morrell, Warwickshire
- Moreton Pinkney, Northamptonshire
- Moreton Road, a road in north Oxford, Oxfordshire
- Moreton Say, Shropshire
- Moreton Valence, Gloucestershire
- Moreton-in-Marsh, Gloucestershire
- Moreton on Lugg, Herefordshire
- Moretonhampstead, Devon

== Other uses ==
- HMAS Moreton, a Royal Australian Navy in Brisbane, Queensland

== See also ==
- Morton (disambiguation)
- Moreton Hall (disambiguation)
- Moreton House (disambiguation)
