= Morton House =

Morton House or Morton Mansion may refer to:

- Asher Morton Farmstead, Paris, IL, listed on the NRHP in Illinois
- Oliver P. Morton House, Centerville, IN, listed on the NRHP in Indiana
- Roberts-Morton House, Newburgh, IN, listed on the NRHP in Indiana
- William Morton House, Lexington, KY, listed on the NRHP in Kentucky
- Morton-Myer House, Boonville, MO, listed on the NRHP in Missouri
- Morton Morton House, Norwood, PA, listed on the NRHP in Pennsylvania
- Morton Homestead, Prospect Park, PA, listed on the NRHP in Pennsylvania
- Samuel S. Morton House, Franklin, TN, listed on the NRHP in Tennessee
- Benjamin Morton House, Knoxville, TN, listed on the NRHP in Tennessee
- George W. Morton House, Nolensville, TN, listed on the NRHP in Tennessee
- Ritter-Morton House, Spring Hill, TN, listed on the NRHP in Tennessee
- Morton House (Ennis, Texas), listed on the NRHP in Texas
- Brodhead-Bell-Morton Mansion, Washington, D.C, listed on the NRHP in Washington, D.C.
- Morton House (Webster Springs, West Virginia), listed on the NRHP in West Virginia
- Cox-Morton House, Charleston, WV, listed on the NRHP in West Virginia
- Morton Mansion (Douglas, Wyoming), listed on the NRHP in Wyoming

== See also ==
- Moreton House (disambiguation)
