= Morchard =

Morchard may refer to:

- Morchard, South Australia, a settlement
- Morchard Bishop, a small village in Mid-Devon, England
- Morchard Road, a small hamlet in Mid-Devon, England
- Cruwys Morchard, a historic estate in Mid-Devon, England
