= Edwin Dolby =

English architect (1838–1900)

- Born: 1838
- Died: 1900 (aged 61–62)
- Occupation: Architect
- Projects: Abingdon School; Albert Park, Abingdon

Edwin Dolby was an English Victorian architect who practised in Abingdon. His works include the design of Abingdon School.

== Career ==
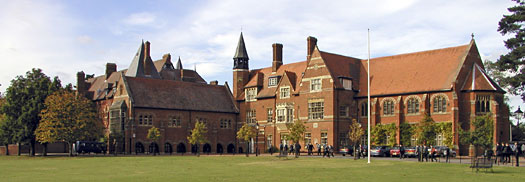
Abingdon School, School House, the Big Schoolroom and Underground by Edwin Dolby, built 1869–70, bell turret 1880

According to census records Dolby was born in Sutton Bonington, Nottinghamshire. By 1869 he working from 2 Bedwell Place, East St Helen Street, Abingdon, then in Berkshire.

His known works span the period 1863–88. Dolby altered, rebuilt or restored a number of Anglican parish churches. Many of them were in the Vale of White Horse (then part of Berkshire) and Oxfordshire, but he also rebuilt two churches in Pembrokeshire. Drawings for one of the latter, at Castlebythe, were published in the Church Builder in 1867. In 1869–70 he built Abingdon School, described in The Builder as "of a simple character, the local material of red brick and tile being the chief material employed, relieved by bands of Bath stone".

In 1877–78 Dolby worked with the architect H.J. Tollit of Oxford, rebuilding the parish churches at Watlington and Crowell, both in Oxfordshire. After his partnership with Dolby, Tollit designed Thame Town Hall in 1888, a building for Littlemore Hospital in 1902 and a factory for Morris Motors in Longwall Street, Oxford in 1910.

== Work ==
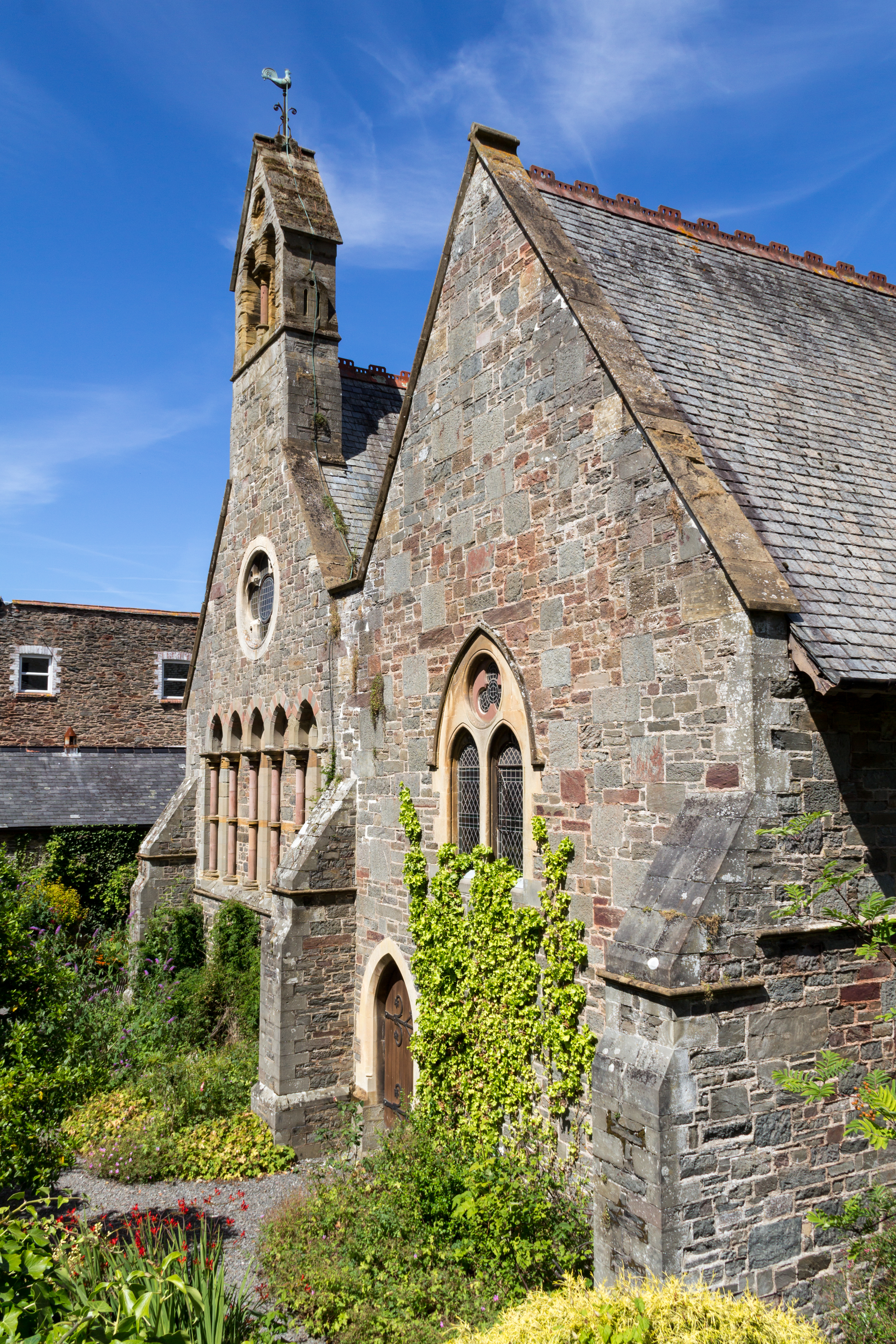
St John the Baptist's church, Lynmouth, Devon

- Eagles Close Almshouses, Wantage, 1867.
- Claydon House, Claydon, Oxfordshire: alterations, 1867.
- St Peter's parish church, Headley, Hampshire, 1867–68.
- Abingdon School, Abingdon, Berkshire (now Oxfordshire), 1869–70.
- St John the Baptist's church, Lynmouth, Devon, 1871.
- St Michael's parish Church, Castlebythe, Pembrokeshire: rebuilding, 1875 (demolished).
- St David's parish Church, Llanychaer, Pembrokeshire: rebuilding, 1876
- St Giles' parish church, Medbourne, Leicestershire, chancel, 1876.
- St Leonard's parish church, Watlington, Oxfordshire: rebuilding (with H.J. Tollit), 1877.
- St Mary's parish church, Crowell, Oxfordshire: rebuilding (with H.J. Tollit), 1878.
- St. Michael's parish church, Sutton Bonington, Nottinghamshire: restoration including complete rebuilding of the chancel and porch, 1878.
- St Peter's parish church, Drayton, Cherwell: restoration and new vestry, 1878.
- St Peter's parish church, Drayton, Vale of White Horse: south porch, 1879.
- St Nicolas' parish church, Abingdon: restoration, 1880.
- St Luke's parish church, Garford, Oxfordshire: rebuilding, 1880.
- Abingdon School, Abingdon, Berkshire (now Oxfordshire): extension and bell turret, 1880.
- St Edmund's parish church, Swanton Novers, Norfolk: north aisle and chancel, 1881.
- St John the Baptist parish church, Kingston Bagpuize, Oxfordshire: added apse and made alterations, 1882.
- Mortuary Chapel at Hatfield Cemetery, Doncaster, Yorkshire, 1883.

Dolby was also one of the architects of the Albert Park housing estate in Abingdon, along with Dolby's pupil John George Timothy West (1860–1931) and his son Archibald Buller West (1885–1957).

== Sources ==
- Brodie, Antonia; Felstead, Alison; Franklin, Jonathan; Pinfield, Leslie; Oldfield, Jane, eds. (2001). Directory of British Architects 1834–1914, A–K. London & New York: Continuum. p. 547. ISBN 0-8264-5513-1.
- Lloyd, Thomas; Orbach, Julian; Scourfield, Robert (2004). Pembrokeshire. The Buildings of Wales. New Haven, CT: Yale University Press. p. 262. ISBN 0300101783.
- Pevsner, Nikolaus (1966). Berkshire. The Buildings of England. Harmondsworth: Penguin Books.
- Pevsner, Nikolaus; Lloyd, David (1967). Hampshire and the Isle of Wight. The Buildings of England. Harmondsworth: Penguin Books. p. 286.
- Sherwood, Jennifer; Pevsner, Nikolaus (1974). Oxfordshire. The Buildings of England. Harmondsworth: Penguin Books. ISBN 0-14-071045-0.
- Tyack, Geoffrey (1998). Oxford An Architectural Guide. Oxford & New York: Oxford University Press. p. 267. ISBN 0-19-817423-3.
