= Lathbury Road =

Road in North Oxford, England

Coordinates: 51.7725°N 1.2653°W

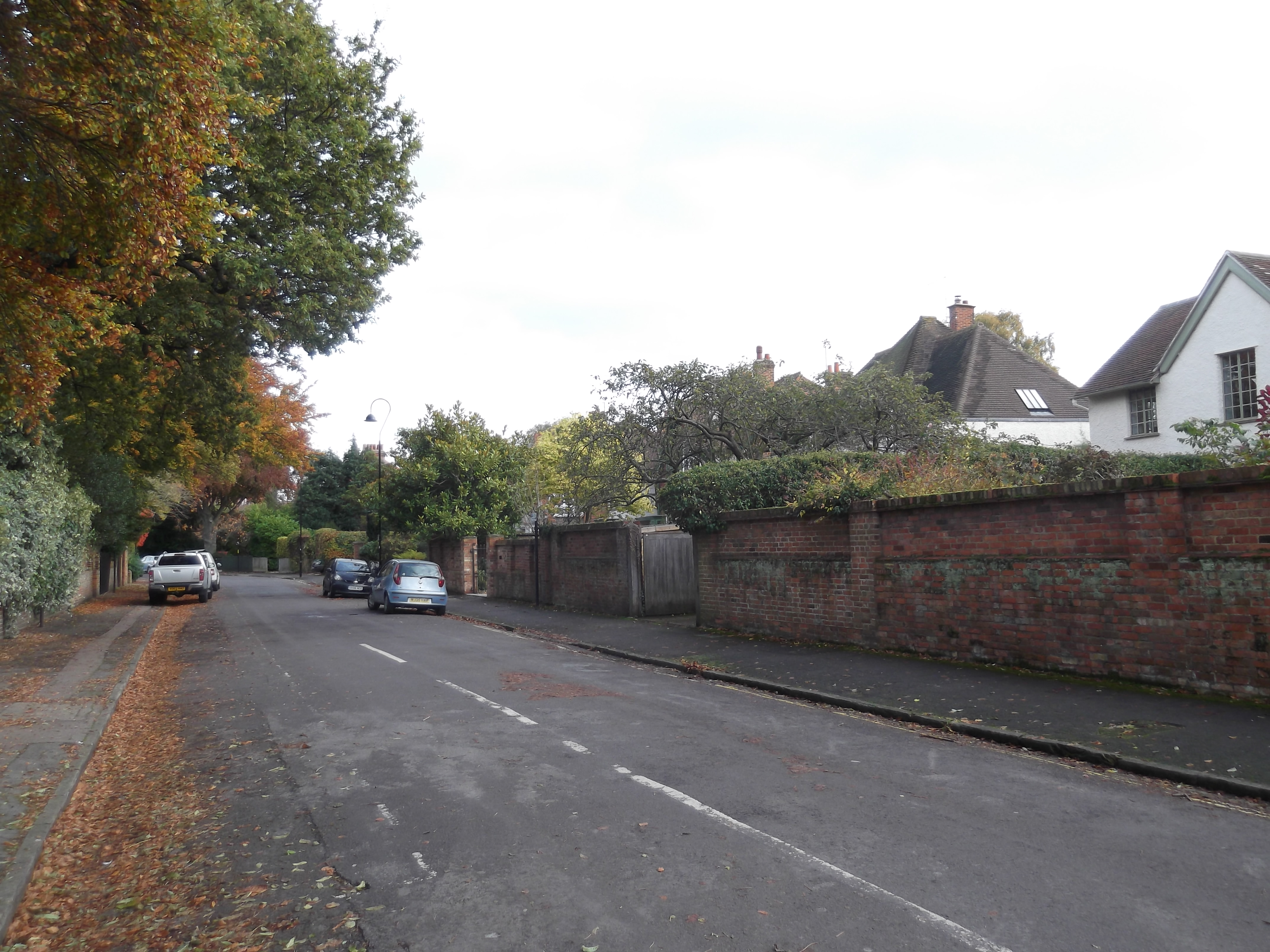
View east along Lathbury Road from the junction with Woodstock Road.

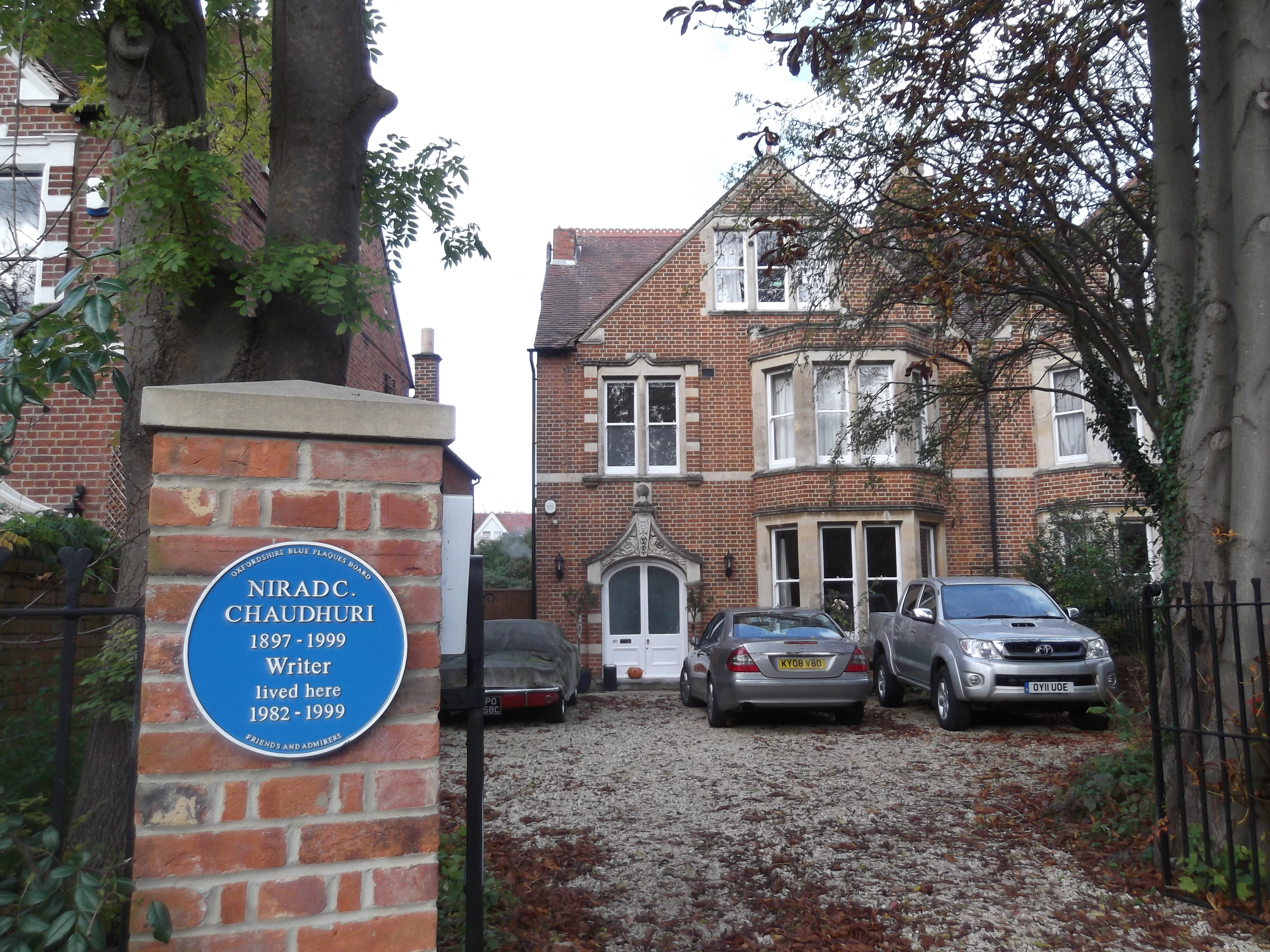
20 Lathbury Road, the former home of the Bengali author and broadcaster Nirad Chaudhuri, with its blue plaque.

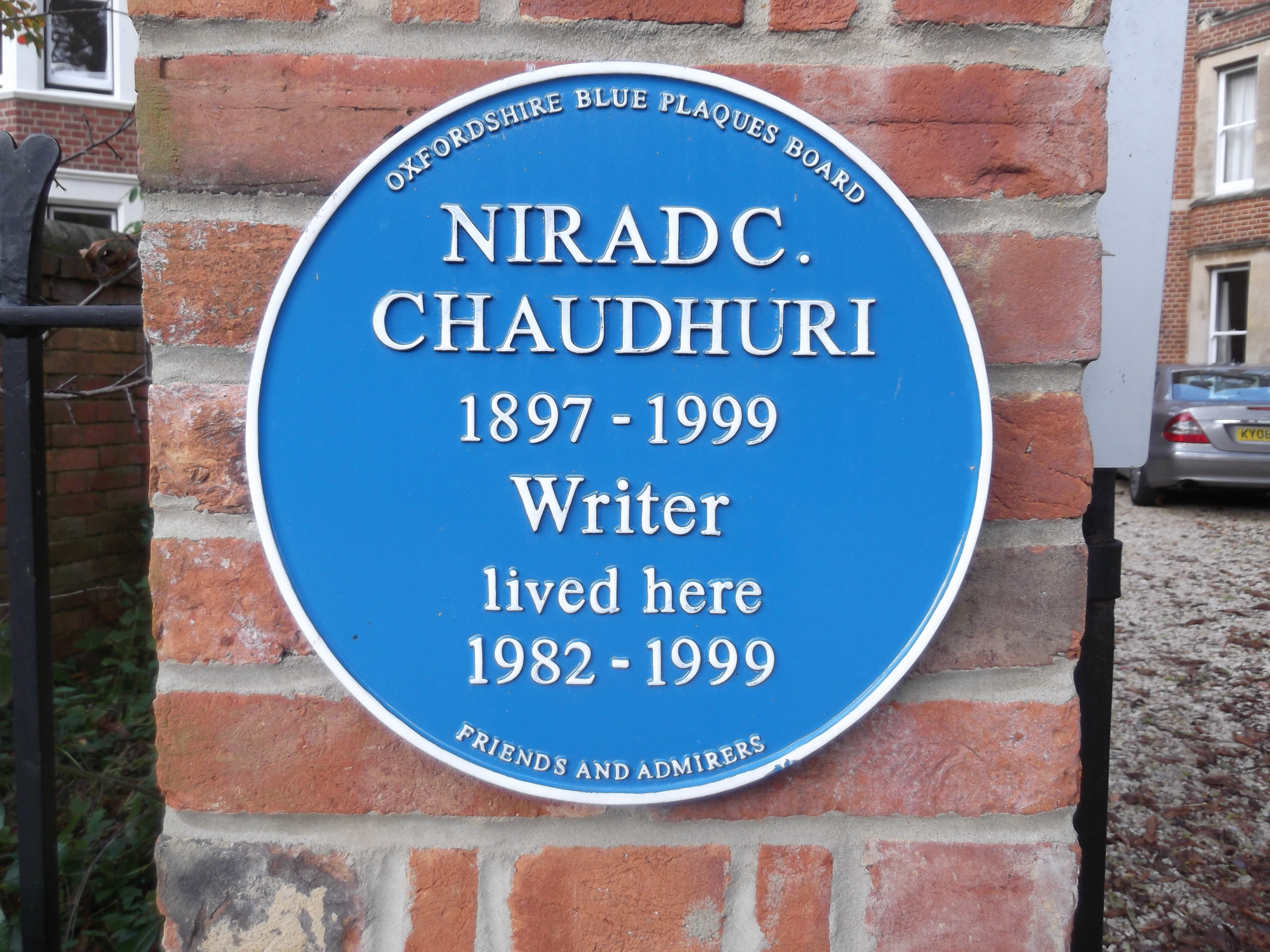
The blue plaque for Nirad Chaudhuri in Lathbury Road.

Lathbury Road is a short residential road in north Oxford, England.

The road runs approximately east–west with a small curve halfway along. At the western end of the road is a junction with Woodstock Road (A4144) and at the eastern end is a junction with Banbury Road (A4165), the two major arterial roads out of Oxford to the north. To the south is Staverton Road and to the north is Moreton Road. It lies to the north of the original North Oxford development by St John's College, Oxford but since it is south of Summertown it is often considered to be part of Central North Oxford, with high house prices.

The Bengali author and broadcaster Nirad Chaudhuri (1897–1999) lived at 20 Lathbury Road from 1982 to 1999. A blue plaque was installed by the Oxfordshire Blue Plaques Board in 2008. The jurist and international lawyer Sir Humphrey Waldock (1904–1981) lived at 6 Lathbury Road. The historian Ralph Henry Carless Davis (1918–1991) lived in Lathbury Road with his wife Eleanor. The philologist and Kafka authority, Sir Malcolm Pasley (1926-2004) lived at number 25 with his wife Virginia. Number 26, Elmswood, was built by the Arts and Craft architect Percy Richard Morley Horder for Ulric Vernon Herford (1866-1938). From a Unitarian family, Herford was consecrated as a bishop in the Syro-Chaldean (Nestorian) Church, and is considered one of the founders of Free Catholicism. Elmswood has a chapel and was more recently occupied by the linguist Maurice Pope (1926-2019). Other Lathbury road residents have included George Brownlee and Harriet Green.

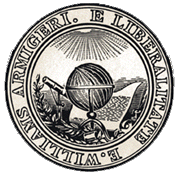
description=Williams College seal.

In the early 1980s, Williams College, a liberal arts college located in Williamstown, Massachusetts, United States, purchased a group of houses, today known as the Ephraim Williams House, on Banbury Road and Lathbury Road. The Williams-Exeter Programme was founded in 1985. Since that time, 26 undergraduate students from Williams College spend their junior year at Exeter College, Oxford each year as members of the college.

The Nursery (for 2–5-year-old children) is located at 17 Lathbury Road. The main premises of St Clare's, an independent international boarding school founded in 1953, is also located at 139 Banbury Road, just to the north of Lathbury Road.

== See also ==
- Lathbury
- Eprime Eshag
