= Thame Town Hall =

Municipal building in Thame, Oxfordshire, England

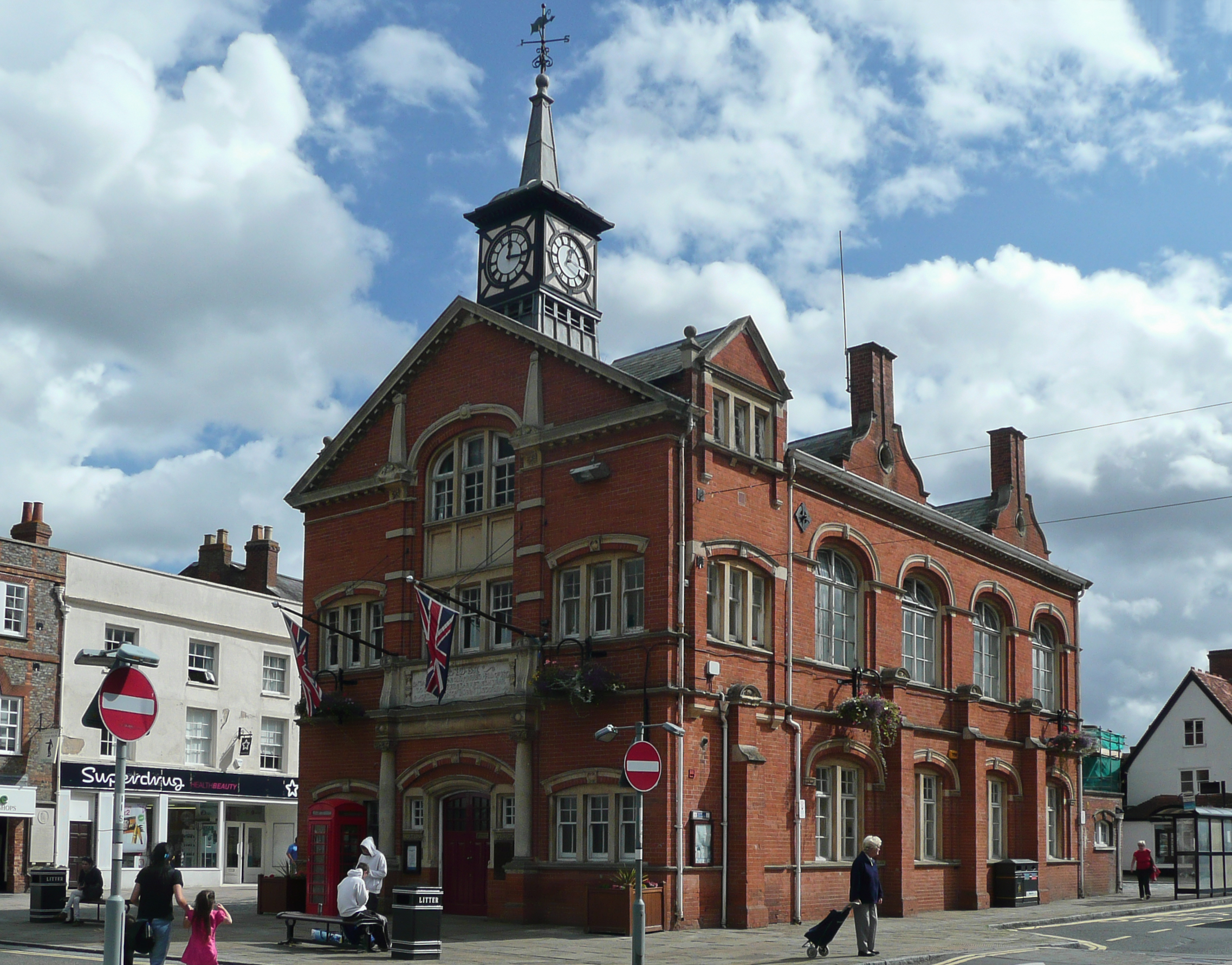
- Thame Town Hall

- Shown in Oxfordshire
- 51.7475°N 0.9784°W
- Location: High Street, Thame

History
- Built: 1887

Site notes
- Architect: Henry James Tollit
- Architectural style: Jacobethan style

Listed Building – Grade II
- Official name: Town Hall
- Designated: 8 June 1970
- Reference no.: 1368763

Thame Town Hall is a municipal building in the High Street, Thame, Oxfordshire, England. The town hall, which is the meeting place of Thame Town Council, is a Grade II listed building.

== History ==
A moot hall, which was designed with arcading on the ground floor to allow markets to be held, was erected in the Middle Row (between the Buttermarket to the north and the Cornmarket to the south) in the High Street in 1509. After the moot hall fell into a state of disrepair, a second market hall, which was also arcaded and featured a clock tower, was commissioned by the James Bertie, 1st Earl of Abingdon in 1684. In the late 1850s, following complaints that the 17th century market hall was inadequate for large public meetings, civic leaders decided to acquire the old building from Montagu Bertie, 6th Earl of Abingdon, to demolish it and to erect a new town hall, financed by public subscription, on the same site as part of the town's celebrations for the Golden Jubilee of Queen Victoria. The old market hall clock, which had originally been made for Rycote chapel in 1577, was removed from the clock tower before it was demolished and donated to St Catherine's Church at Towersey.

The new building was designed by Henry James Tollit in the Jacobethan style, built by a local contractor, John Wells, and completed in 1887. It was constructed from red bricks which had been baked at the Christmas Hill Brickworks in Moreton and was officially opened by a Mrs Reynolds on 2 April 1888.

The design involved a symmetrical main frontage with three bays facing northwest along the High Street; the central bay featured an segmental headed doorway flanked by Ionic order columns supporting an entablature; there was a three-light mullion window on the first floor, a four-light arched mullion window flanked by obelisks on the second floor and a clock tower with a small spire at roof level. The principal room was the council chamber on the first floor which subsequently became known as the Upper Chamber. A fire took place in the Upper Chamber in 1906 and some alterations to the internal layout of the building were subsequently completed.

The town hall was the headquarters of Thame Urban District Council for much of the 20th century but ceased to be the local seat of government when South Oxfordshire District Council was formed in 1974. It subsequently became the home of Thame Town Council. The building featured extensively from the late 1990s in the crime drama television series, Midsomer Murders, as the fictional Causton Town Hall.
