= Charlie Matthews =

English rugby union player

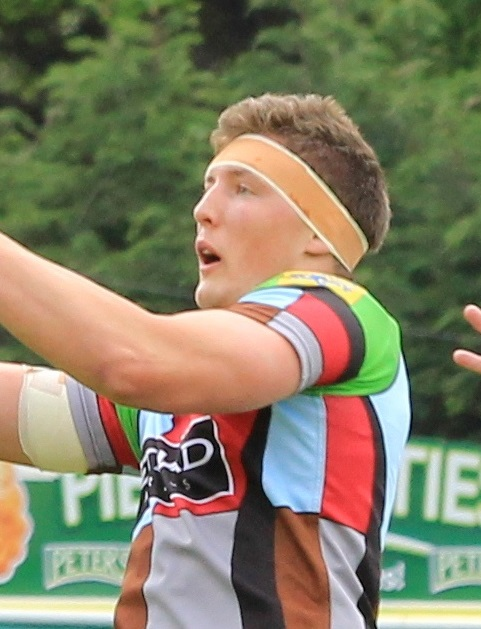
- Matthews playing for Harlequins in 2014
- Born: Charles Walter Watson Matthews; 23 July 1991 (age 35) Kingston-upon-Thames, England
- Height: 2.02 m (6 ft 8 in)
- Weight: 118 kg (18 st 8 lb; 260 lb)
- School: Hurstpierpoint College
- University: Loughborough University

Rugby union career
- Position: Lock
Senior career
Years	Team	Apps	(Points)
2009–2018	Harlequins	164	(40)
2018–2020	Wasps	30	(0)
2020–2022	Kamaishi Seawaves	11	(0)
2022–2023	Harlequins	10	(0)
2023–	Biarritz	10	(10)
- Correct as of 16 January 2025
International career
Years	Team	Apps	(Points)
- England U18
2010–2011	England U20	20	(10)
2014	England Saxons	3	(0)

Charles Walter W. Matthews (born 23 July 1991) is an English rugby union player French Pro D2 team Biarritz Olympique.

Matthews attended Hurstpierpoint College in West Sussex, where he was Head Boy in his final year.

Matthews was selected for the England squad to face the Barbarians in the summer of 2014. The second-row previously also represented England at U20 level at the 2010 IRB Junior World Championship and 2011 IRB Junior World Championship in Argentina and Italy respectively.

Matthews got his first taste of coaching with Sussex RFU in 2017–18 before going on to coach at Haslemere RFC, Southam RFC and King's Rugby.

Charlie's great-grandmother was the sculptor and artist Alice Bertha Moreton.
