= Thame =

Market town in Oxfordshire, England

Coordinates: 51.75°N 0.97°W

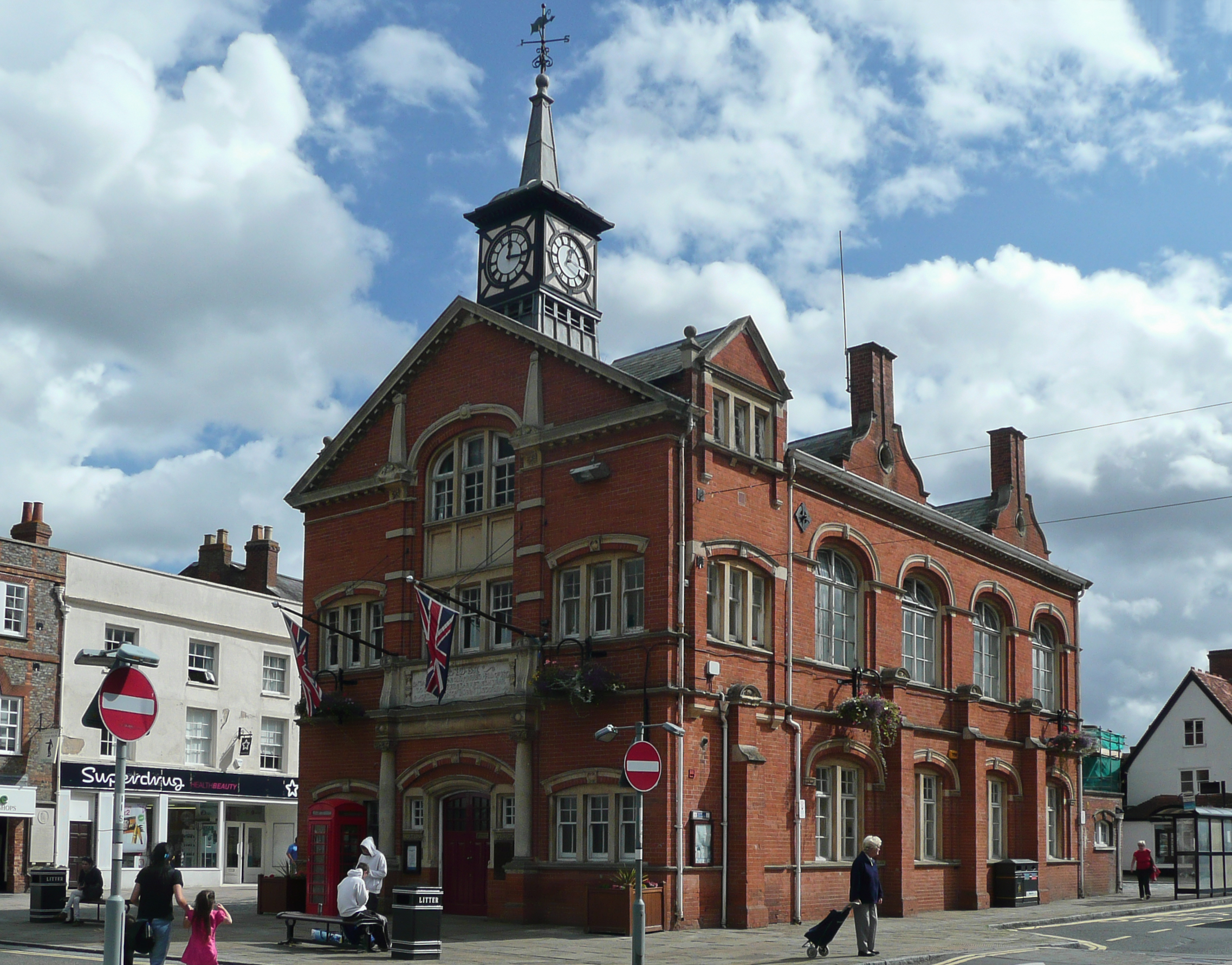
- Thame Town Hall

- Flag

- Location within Oxfordshire
- Area: 12.67 km^{2} (4.89 sq mi)
- Population: 13,273 (2021 Census)
  - Density: 1,048/km^{2} (2,710/sq mi)
- OS grid reference: SP710060
  - London: 40 miles (64 km)
- Civil parish: Thame
- District: South Oxfordshire
- Shire county: Oxfordshire
- Region: South East
- Country: England
- Sovereign state: United Kingdom
- Post town: THAME
- Postcode district: OX9
- Dialling code: 01844
- Police: Thames Valley
- Fire: Oxfordshire
- Ambulance: South Central
- UK Parliament: Henley and Thame
- Website: Thame Town Council

Thame (/teɪm/) is a market town and civil parish in Oxfordshire, England. It is located about 13 miles (21 km) east of the city of Oxford, 10 miles (16 km) south-west of Aylesbury and 40 miles (64 km) north-west of London. It derives its name from the River Thame, which flows along the north side of the town and forms part of the county border with Buckinghamshire. The parish includes the hamlet of Moreton, just south of the town. The 2011 Census recorded the parish's population as 11,561. Thame was founded in the Anglo-Saxon era and was in the kingdom of Wessex.

== History ==
=== Abbey, parish church and prebendal ===
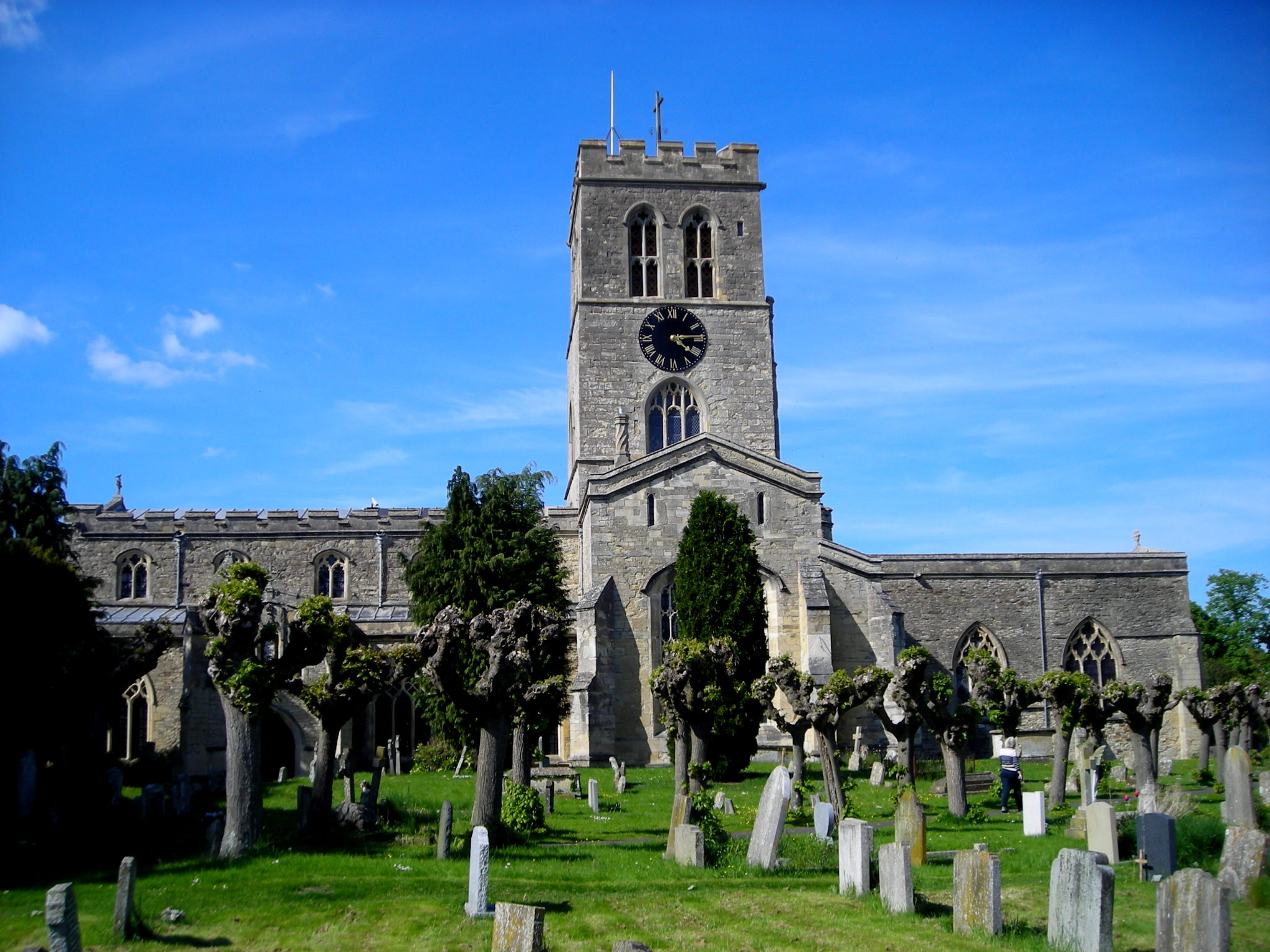
St Mary the Virgin parish church

Thame Abbey was founded in 1138 for the Cistercian Order; the abbey church was consecrated in 1145. In the 16th century Dissolution of the Monasteries, the abbey was suppressed and the church demolished. Thame Park (the house) was built on the site, incorporating parts of the abbey including the early-16th century abbot's house. Its interior is one of the earliest examples of the Italian Renaissance in England. A Georgian west wing was added in the 18th century. In about 1840, parts of the foundations of the abbey church were excavated; it was 77 yards (70 m) long and 23 yards (21 m) wide, with a Lady Chapel extending a further 15 yards (14 m) at the east end.

The earliest feature of the Church of England parish church of Mary the Virgin is the 12th century base of the font. The font's octagonal bowl was recut in the 13th century. The present church is a cruciform building that was built in the 13th century. The chancel is Early English Gothic and was built in about 1220, with six lancet windows in its north wall and presumably a similar arrangement in the south wall. It was altered twice in the next few decades; a three-light plate tracery window was inserted in its north wall in the mid-13th century and the five-light east window with geometrical tracery was inserted in about 1280. Whatever lancet windows may have been in the chancel south wall were replaced with three two-light Decorated Gothic windows with reticulated tracery, and a double piscina was added at the same time.

The transepts and tower arches are also early 13th century. The nave has five-bay north and south aisles, whose arcades were built in about 1260. The aisles were widened in the 14th century, when they acquired their Decorated Gothic windows and doors. The Decorated Gothic south porch has two storeys and a two-bay quadripartite vault.

The Perpendicular Gothic clerestory is 14th or early 15th century; during the latter, the tower piers were strengthened and the two upper stages of the tower were built. In 1442, the north transept was rebuilt with five-light Perpendicular Gothic north and east windows with panel tracery. At about the same time, the south transept acquired similar windows and was extended eastwards to form a chapel with a 15th-century piscina. The Perpendicular Gothic nave west window was inserted in 1672–73, making it an example of Gothic survival. In 1838 the north aisle north wall was rebuilt under the direction of George Wilkinson. The tower has a ring of eight bells, all cast by Mears and Stainbank of the Whitechapel Bell Foundry in 1876.

The Prebendal House is known to have existed by 1234 and the Early English Gothic chapel was built in about 1250. The solar is also 13th century but was enlarged in the 14th, when the present crown-post roof was added. The rest of the Prebendal House is dated from the 15th century. The hall is 14th century in plan, but was later divided and one part now has a fine 15th century roof. In 1661, the antiquary Anthony Wood reported that the house was ruinous and, early in the 19th century, the remains were in use as a farmhouse and barns. It was restored in 1836. The prebendal houses and the Church of St. Mary were both attacked repeatedly in the early 1290s, during a violent conflict between the bishop of Lincoln, Oliver Sutton, and a knight of King Edward I, Sir John St. John. The Prebendal House was the home of singer/songwriter and member of the Bee Gees, Robin Gibb, and his wife Dwina from 1984; Gibb is buried in St Mary's parish churchyard.

=== Social and economic history ===
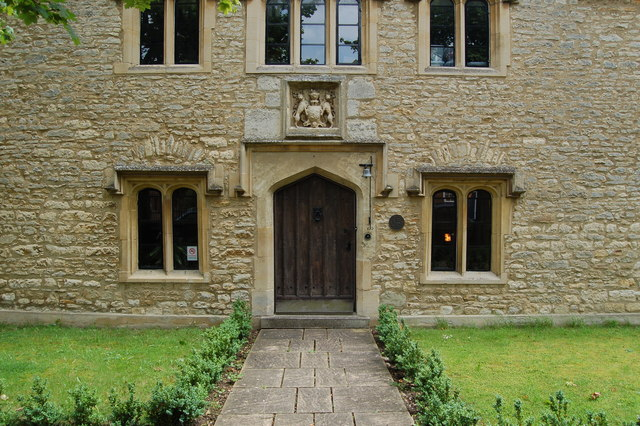
Entrance of the original grammar school building, completed in 1569

In 1550, the courtier John Williams, 1st Baron Williams of Thame built the almshouses in Church Lane. He died in 1559 and his will established the local grammar school. Its original building, completed in 1569, stands next to the almshouses. In 1880 the school moved to its current premises in Oxford Road. In 1971, it became a comprehensive school under the name Lord Williams's School.

The Civil War in the 1640s saw Thame occupied in turn by Royalists and by Parliamentarians. After the Battle of Chalgrove Field in 1643, Colonel John Hampden, who had been educated at the grammar school, died of his wounds at the house of Ezekiel Browne, later to become the Greyhound Inn.

The champion bare-knuckle boxer James Figg was born in Thame in the late 17th century and had his early prize-fights at the Greyhound Inn. In the 21st century the Greyhound Inn was renamed the James Figg and in April 2011 the Oxfordshire Blue Plaques Board unveiled a blue plaque there to commemorate him.

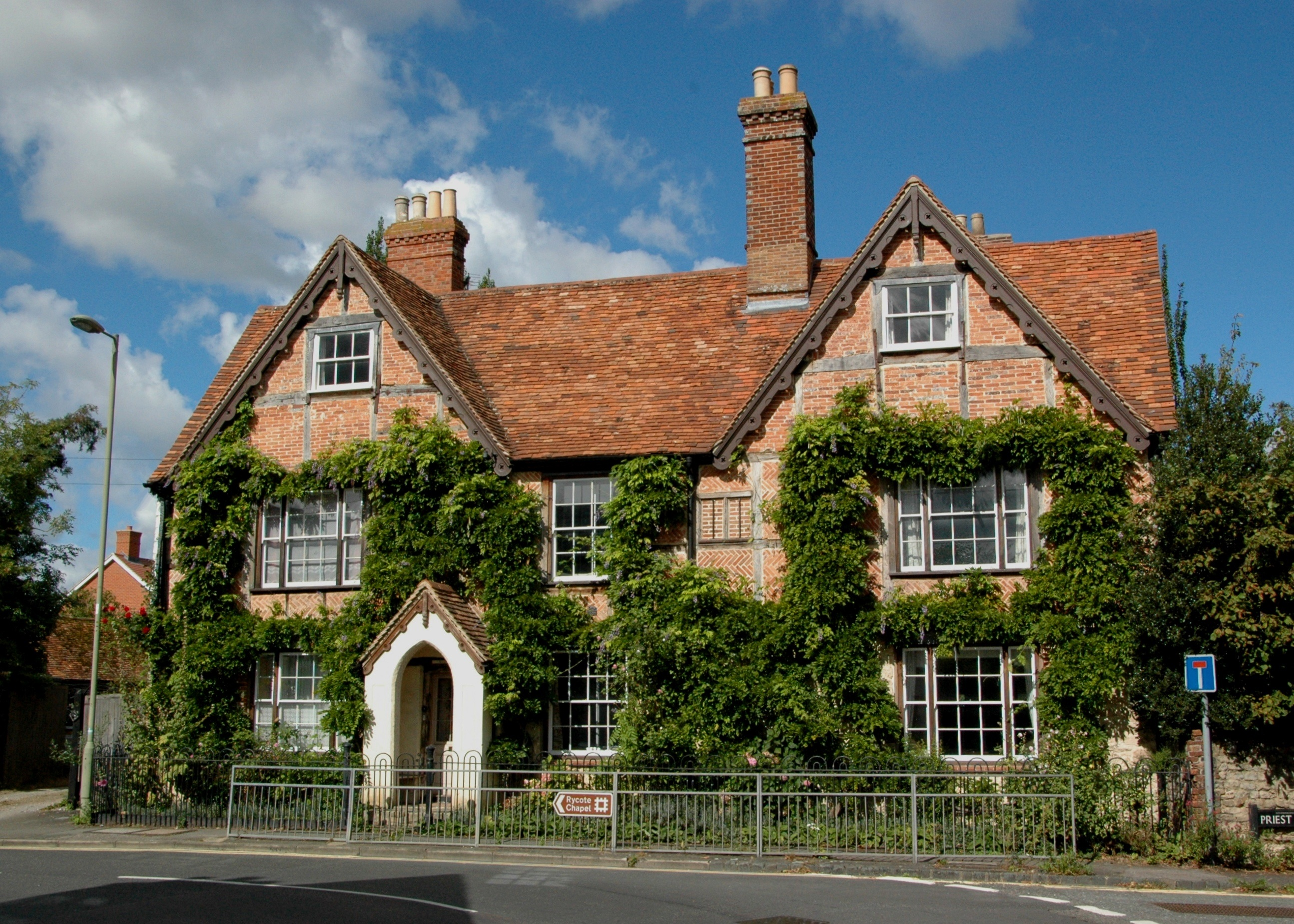
Stribblehills, a 17th-century timber-framed house with brick nogging

In the 18th century, many of the buildings in the boat-shaped High Street were refaced with modern facades, built of locally produced salt glazed bricks. Late in the 18th century, John Wesley preached in Thame. The congregation on that occasion was so large that the floor of the building gave way and the crowd fell to the lower floor.

By 1813, Thame had a workhouse in Wellington Street. In 1826, John Boddington, a miller who had been the proprietor of Thame Mill, became master of the workhouse. In 1831, his son, also John Boddington, became a clerk at Strangeways Brewery in Manchester. A younger son, Henry Boddington, who had been born at Thame Mill in 1813, followed his brother and joined the same brewery in 1832. Henry became a partner in the business in 1847 and sole proprietor in 1853, after which its beers were called Boddingtons. In April 2011, the Oxfordshire Blue Plaques Board unveiled a blue plaque at the address of the former workhouse commemorating its association with Henry Boddington.

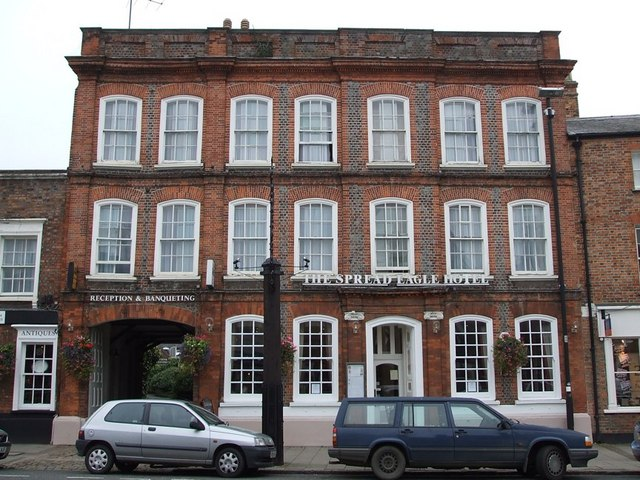
Spread Eagle Hotel, built early in the 18th century

Thame Poor Law Union was established in 1835 and the following year a new workhouse designed by George Wilkinson was built on Oxford Road. In the 20th century, the building became the premises of Rycotewood College of further education. In 2003, it merged with two other colleges of further education to form Oxford and Cherwell College, now City of Oxford College.

Thame railway station was opened in 1862 as the temporary terminus of an extension of the Wycombe Railway from High Wycombe. The extension was completed in 1864 when it reached Oxford. In 1963, British Railways (BR) withdrew passenger services between Princes Risborough and Oxford; it also closed Thame station, leaving Princes Risborough (7 miles (11 km) away) as the nearest passenger station until 1987. BR dismantled the track between Thame and Morris Cowley, but kept the line between Thame and Princes Risborough open for goods traffic to and from an oil depot in Thame.

Thame Town Hall was designed by the architect HJ Tollit in Jacobethan style and built in 1888.

In 1940, Willocks McKenzie, a local lorry driver, found a small hoard of late Medieval coins and rings beside the River Thame. The coins were ten groats and the rings were five ornate examples ranging from the 14th to the 16th centuries. The county Coroner declared them to be treasure trove and therefore Crown property. The Crown placed the hoard on permanent loan to the Ashmolean Museum. The most ornate ring was an ecclesiastical one incorporating a small reliquary. Its lid is decorated with a distinctive cross with two horizontal sections, similar to the Cross of Lorraine. Thame Town Council incorporated this cross into its town emblem.

In 1991, Thame oil depot closed and BR dismantled the railway between Thame and Princes Risborough. Sustrans was allowed to re-use the former trackbed to create the Phoenix Trail which is part of National Cycle Network route 57. Reopening the rail line through Thame was an option considered by Chiltern Railways in their plan to open a direct rail route from London Marylebone to Oxford via Princes Risborough in 2015. The cost of reinstating bridges was considered prohibitive.

=== Administrative history ===
Thame was an ancient parish. The parish historically included the chapelries of Sydenham, Tetsworth, and Towersey, each of which had become separate parishes by the early nineteenth century.

In 1871, the parish of Thame was made a local government district, administered by an elected local board. Thame Town Hall was completed in 1888, to serve as the meeting place and offices of the local board, as well as providing a public hall for the town. It was funded by public subscriptions to commemorate the Diamond Jubilee of Queen Victoria in 1887. Local government districts were reconstituted as urban districts under the Local Government Act 1894.

Thame Urban District was abolished in 1974 under the Local Government Act 1972. District-level functions passed to the new South Oxfordshire District Council. A successor parish called Thame was created covering the area of the abolished urban district, with its parish council taking the name Thame Town Council.

== Governance ==
There are three tiers of local government covering Thame: at civil parish (town), district and county level: Thame Town Council, South Oxfordshire District Council, and Oxfordshire County Council. The town council is based at Thame Town Hall in the High Street.

== Economy ==
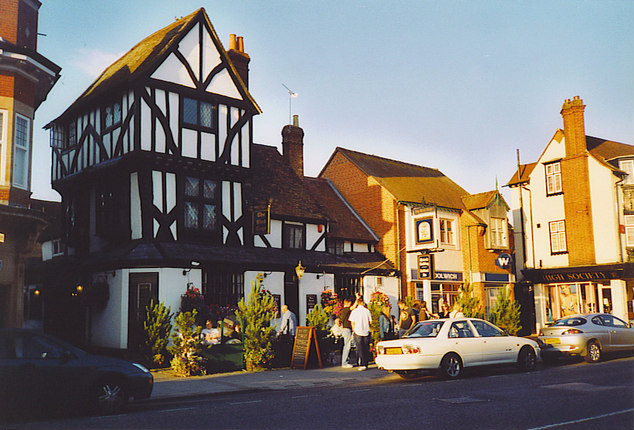
Bird Cage, an early 16th-century public house

The town's two largest employers, CPM Group and Travelodge, both have their head offices on the edge of the town. W. Lucy & Co. moved its base from Oxford to Thame in 2005.

== Education ==
Thame has three primary schools: Barley Hill Primary School, John Hampden Primary School and St Joseph's Catholic Primary School. It has one county secondary school, Lord Williams's School.

Both the Army Cadets and the Air Training Corps have units in the town. 594 (Thame) Air Training Corps was formed in 1994, originally as a detached flight of 966 (Wallingford) Squadron. It became an independent unit in 1997, taking the number 594 Squadron.

== Transport ==
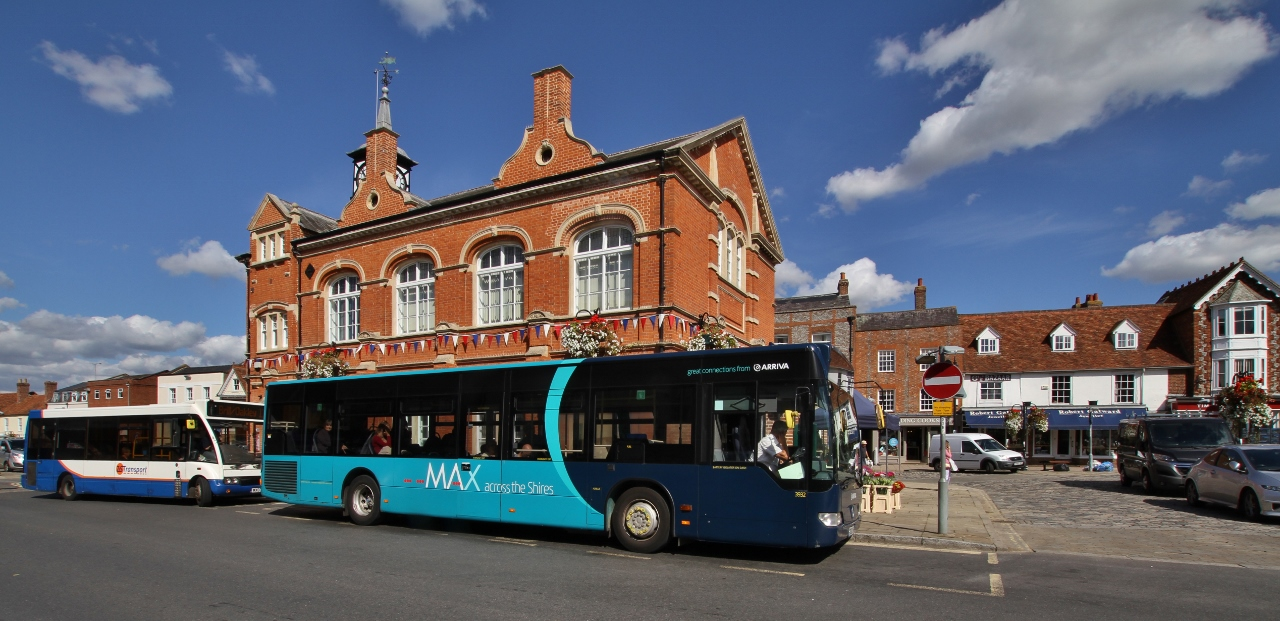
Arriva Herts & Essex and Z&S buses outside Thame Town Hall

Key bus routes that serve the area include:

- X20: Redline Buses links Oxford and Aylesbury, via Haddenham
- 40: Red Rose Travel connects Thame with High Wycombe, via Chinnor and Stokenchurch
- 121: Z&S Transport operates a circular route around Thame
- 400: Oxford Bus Company links Oxford railway station and Thame, via Wheatley and Tiddington.

In 1987, British Rail opened Haddenham and Thame Parkway station on the Chiltern Main Line. It is located at Haddenham, about 2 miles (3 km) north-east of Thame, to serve both settlements. Chiltern Railways provides passenger services to High Wycombe, London Marylebone, Banbury and Birmingham Snow Hill.

The M40 motorway is accessible at junction 7 at Milton Common, about 3 miles (5 km) south-west of Thame, giving the town a fast road link to London. In 1990, the M40 extension was completed, giving Thame direct access to Birmingham.

== Media ==
Local news and television programmes are BBC South and ITV Meridian. Television signals are received from the Oxford TV transmitter.

Thame's local radio stations are BBC Radio Oxford on 95.2 FM, Heart South on 102.6 FM, Greatest Hits Radio on 106.4 FM (formerly Jack FM), Greatest Hits Radio Bucks, Beds and Herts (formerly Mix 96) on 96.2 FM and Red Kite Radio that broadcast from Aylesbury.

The Thame Hub and Oxford Mail are the local newspapers.

== Sport ==
Chinnor Rugby Club is based at Thame. Its first XV currently plays in the English Champ Rugby. Thame United Football Club first team plays in Southern League Division One East The Oxfordshire Golf Club is 1 mile (1.6 km) south-west of Thame. The course was designed by Rees Jones and has hosted tournaments including the Benson & Hedges International Open from 1996 until 1999. Thame Leisure Centre, located on Oxford Road, has a 25-metre swimming pool, dance studio, gym and racquet sports facilities.

== In popular culture ==
Bentley Productions used Thame many times as a location for the Midsomer Murders drama series, representing the fictional town of Causton.

== Notable residents ==
- John Fothergill, innkeeper, entrepreneur and writer, owned and managed the Spread Eagle Hotel between 1922 and 1931.
- Violinist Alfredo Campoli (1906–91) was married at St Joseph's Catholic Church in 1942 and retired to Thame in 1986. In April 2011, the Oxfordshire Blue Plaques Board unveiled a blue plaque at 39 North Street to commemorate him.
- The Slow Mo Guys, English film-maker and Internet personality Gavin Free (born 1988) and his co-host Daniel Gruchy (born 1988), lived in the town from 1992 until 2012. Gavin now lives in Austin, Texas, United States.
- Robin Gibb, of the Bee Gees, and his wife Dwina Murphy-Gibb lived in Prebendal House in Thame until his death in 2012. Robin's younger brother, Andy Gibb, also lived there in the weeks before his death in 1988.
- BBC actor, announcer, executive Harman Grisewood (1908–97) was brought up at the Prebendal House in the 1910s and 1920s. It had a resident Catholic priest, Father Randolph Traill, who served in its chapel. In his autobiography, One Thing at a Time (1968), he described an outing with his brother, nanny, nursemaid and pram, when they were stoned by villagers as they approached the Church of England parish church.
- Poet and playwright W. B. Yeats (1865–1939) lived in the town for a short time at Cuttle Brook House, 42 Lower High Street. His son was born there in 1921. A blue plaque commemorating him was unveiled in 2011.
- The composer Howard Goodall lived in Thame in the 1960s and 70s and, after leaving Stowe School, attended Lord Williams' School
- Jonathan More and Matt Black, the duo who make up Coldcut both lived in Thame and attended LWS
- Ronald Lee, cricketer
- Fiona Bruce, television presenter.

== Freedom of the Town ==
The following people and military units have received the Freedom of the Town of Thame.

=== Military units ===
- RAF Halton: 15 May 2022.

== Twinning ==
Thame is twinned with Montesson in France and Sinaia in Romania.

== See also ==
- Thame Museum
