= Littlemore Hospital =

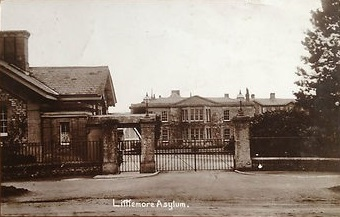
- Littlemore Hospital

- Shown in Oxfordshire

Geography
- Location: Littlemore, Oxfordshire, England
- Coordinates: 51.7180°N 1.2268°W

Organisation
- Care system: NHS
- Type: Specialist

Services
- Emergency department: N/A
- Speciality: Psychiatric Hospital

History
- Founded: 1846
- Closed: 1998

Links
- Lists: Hospitals in England

Littlemore Hospital was a mental health facility on Sandford Road in Littlemore, Oxfordshire.

== History ==
The hospital, which was designed by Robert Clarke using a Corridor Plan layout, opened as the Oxford County Pauper Lunatic Asylum in August 1846. The ward spurs were extended to a design by Henry Jones Underwood in 1847.

Littlemore railway station was opened, giving improved access to the hospital, in 1864, and two additional pavilion blocks connected by a recreation hall were completed to a design by Edwin Dolby and Henry Tollit in 1902. During the last few months of the First World War the hospital served as the Ashurst Military hospital and it was then renamed Littlemore Hospital in 1922.

After some of the pavilions saw service with the Emergency Hospital Service during the Second World War, the whole facility joined the National Health Service in 1948. Dr Bertram Mandelbrote, who carried out pioneering work on creating therapeutic communities, became superintendent at the hospital in 1959.

After the introduction of Care in the Community in the early 1980s, the hospital went into a period of decline and closed in 1998. The main hospital building was converted into apartments as St. George's Park. Some of the rear blocks were acquired by Yamanouchi (now Astellas Pharma) for use as a research facility but then sold on, in 2008, to the SAE Institute for use as a training establishment. Meanwhile, a modern mental health facility known as the Littlemore Mental Health Centre, which includes the Ashurst Psychiatric Intensive Care Unit (PICU) and Phoenix Ward (Adult Male in-patient), have been established on the opposite side of Sandford Road.
