= Ronald Lee (cricketer) =

English cricketer and military officer

Personal information
- Full name: Ronald Outram Lee
- Born: 26 December 1876; Thame, Oxfordshire, England
- Died: 12 March 1940 (aged 63); Oxford, Oxfordshire, England
- Batting: Right-handed
- Bowling: Right-arm fast

Domestic team information
- Years: Team
- 1896–1899: Oxfordshire
- 1899: Cambridge University

Career statistics
Competition	First-class
Matches	1
Runs scored	0
Batting average	0.00
100s/50s	–/–
Top score	0
Balls bowled	140
Wickets	3
Bowling average	26.33
5 wickets in innings	–
10 wickets in match	–
Best bowling	2/59
Catches/stumpings	1/–
- Source: Cricinfo, 25 June 2019

Ronald Outram Lee (26 December 1876 – 12 March 1940) was an English first-class cricketer and an officer in both the British Army and the British Indian Army, as well as playing first-class cricket while serving in British India.

Lee was born at Thame in December 1876 to Dr Herbert Grove Lee. He was educated at Haileybury College, before going up to study medicine at Emmanuel College, Cambridge. He played minor counties cricket for Oxfordshire on three occasions during his summer break, playing twice in the 1896 Minor Counties Championship and once in the 1899 Minor Counties Championship. While at Cambridge he made a single appearance in first-class cricket for Cambridge University against Surrey at The Oval in 1899. Batting once in the match, he was dismissed in the Cambridge first-innings without scoring by Bill Brockwell. With his right-arm fast bowling, he took 3 wickets in the match to finish with match figures of 3 for 79. He qualified with his M.B. in 1906, and began working as a surgeon at house physician Middlesex Hospital. He served throughout the First World War with the Royal Army Medical Corps. From 1920 until his death in March 1940, he practiced medicine at Thame Hospital in Thame.
