= Monkwood =

Hamlet in Hampshire, England

Coordinates: 51.07367°N 1.04676°W

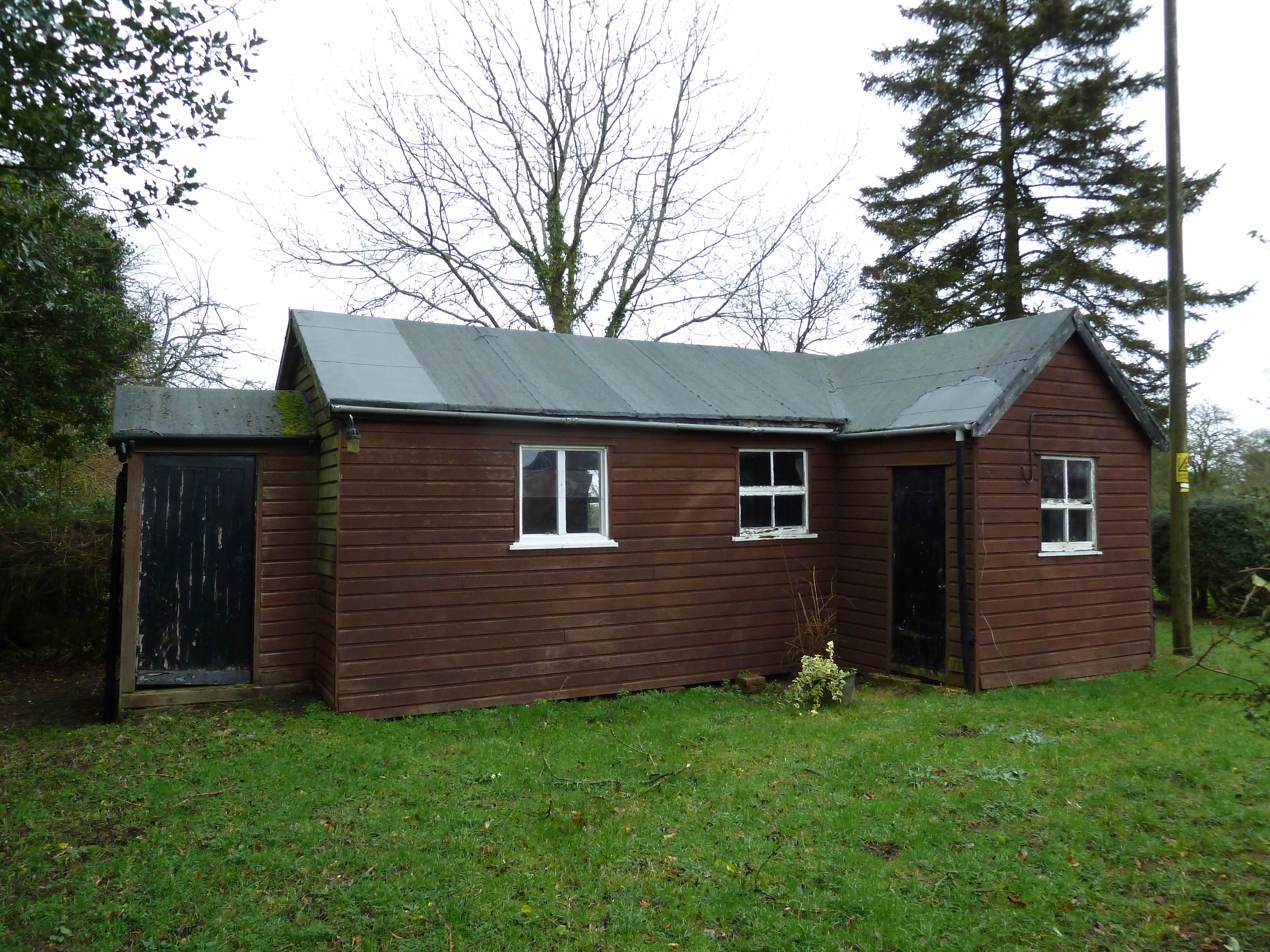
- Monkwood Mission Hall

- Location within Hampshire
- OS grid reference: SU667309
- Civil parish: Ropley
- District: East Hampshire
- Shire county: Hampshire
- Region: South East
- Country: England
- Sovereign state: United Kingdom
- Post town: Alresford
- Postcode district: SO24
- Police: Hampshire and Isle of Wight
- Fire: Hampshire and Isle of Wight
- Ambulance: South Central
- UK Parliament: East Hampshire

Monkwood is a Hamlet in the south of Ropley parish. Although currently it is spread between Petersfield Road and Hill Farm Road, historically it referred to the settlement on the south side of Smugglers Lane (SU 6605630920) containing the 15th Century Smugglers, the 16th Century The Old Farmhouse and the C18th century cottage between the two. The more recent settlement between Petersfield Road and Hill Farm Lane originates from around the late 1800s, with only two settlements; Hill Farm and Ropley Common Farm visible in the 1870s OS Map.

== Etymology ==
The first mention of Monkwood is in 1550 as Monkwodd (see below) and suggests a monastical connection, possibly with Selbourne Priory who held a great deal of land in West Tisted, alternatively it has been theorised that it was named after Newark Priory. However little evidence exists for this theory. It is equally possible that the hamlet is named after 'William le Monek' who was recorded in 1327 in a poll tax assessment of Ropley- his name directly translates to William the Monk. The Woodland specifically referred to is preserved in the 1839 Ropley Parish Tithe Map which lists a series of names focused around the junction of Smugglers Lane and Petersfield Road.

== Smugglers Lane ==
The historical settlement of Monkwood was centred around Smugglers Lane, this name likely is a late 18th century or early 19th century creation as historically it was known as "Munkdean Lane" from the Old English Dene meaning valley. Smuggling was rife in Ropley in the later 1700s and stories of plotted murder, hiding contraband and people, although some are possibly folklore, are nonetheless reflective of smuggling in this village and area.
