= Moreton Hall =

Moreton Hall may refer to the following places in England:

- Moreton Hall, Bury St Edmunds, a country house and former school
  - Moreton Hall Community Woods
- Moreton Hall, Warwickshire, a historic house in Moreton Morrell
- Moreton Hall School, Weston Rhyn, Oswestry, Shropshire
- Great Moreton Hall, a historic country house in Moreton cum Alcumlow, Cheshire
- Little Moreton Hall, a manor house near Congleton in Cheshire

== See also ==
- Moreton House (disambiguation)
