= Moreton House =

Moreton House may refer to:

- Moreton House, Bideford
- Moreton House, Hampstead

== See also ==
- Moreton Hall (disambiguation)
- Morton House (disambiguation)
- Moretons House, at Harrow School
