= Morton Tinmouth =

Hamlet in County Durham, England

Coordinates: 54.586°N 1.709°W

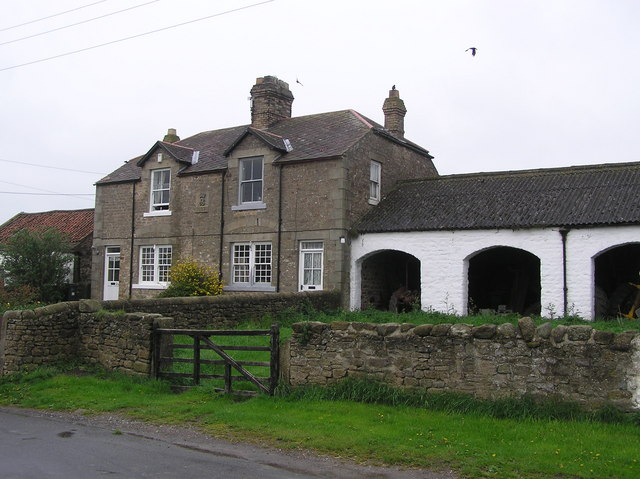
- Houses in Morton Tinmouth

- Location within County Durham
- Population: 14 (2021 census)
- Civil parish: Morton Tinmouth
- Unitary authority: County Durham
- Ceremonial county: Durham
- Region: North East
- Country: England
- Sovereign state: United Kingdom
- Police: Durham
- Fire: County Durham and Darlington
- Ambulance: North East

Morton Tinmouth is a hamlet of a few farms in County Durham, England. It is situated a few miles to the north-west of Darlington close to the village of Bolam. In 2021 the parish had a population of 14.
