= Henry James Tollit =

English architect

- Born: 1835
- Died: 1904 (aged 68–69)
- Occupation: Architect

Henry James Tollit (1835–1904) was an English architect who practised in Oxford.

Tollit trained under William Wilkinson (1819–1901) and was in practice by 1870. He worked in partnership with Edwin Dolby in 1877–78. Tollit was also the county surveyor for Oxfordshire.

His son Reginald James Tollit (born 1870) became an architect and had his own practice in Cambridge. "H.J. Tollit and Lee" are recorded as the firm of architects of the Morris Motors factory built in Longwall Street, Oxford in 1910 but this was six years after H.J. Tollit's death.

== Works ==
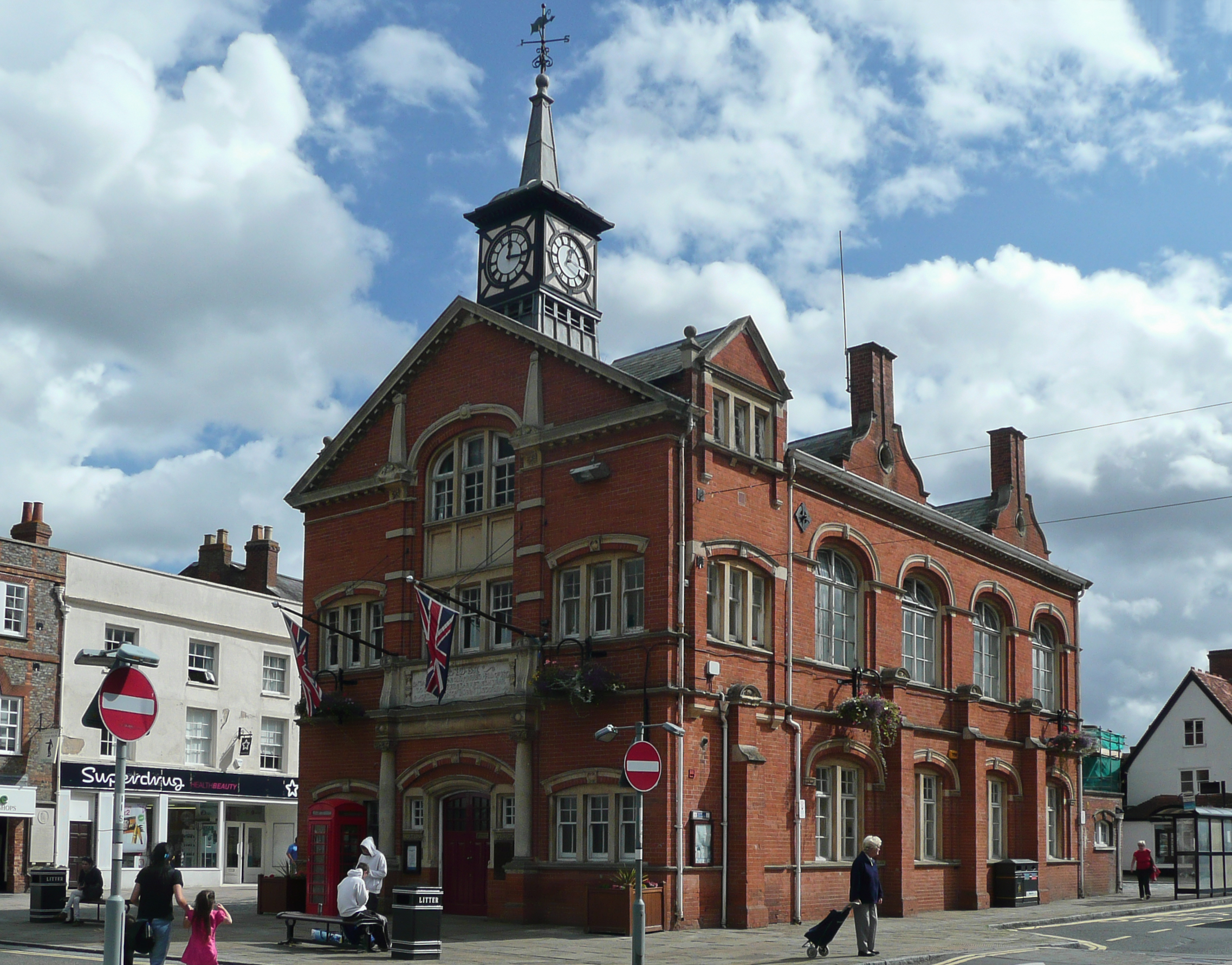
Thame Town Hall, built in 1888

- St Cross parish church, Oxford: organ chamber and vestry, 1876
- St Leonard's parish church, Watlington, Oxfordshire: rebuilding, 1877 (with Dolby)
- St Mary the Virgin parish church, Crowell, Oxfordshire: rebuilding, 1878 (with Dolby)
- The Eagle Steam Brewery, Park End Street, Oxford: new buildings, 1885
- Thame Town Hall, Oxfordshire, 1888
- Tower Brewery, Park End Street, Oxford: additional buildings, 1890s–1900s
- Archer, Cowley & Co's Cantay Depositories furniture warehouse, Park End Street, Oxford, 1901
- County Psychiatric Hospital, Littlemore Hospital, Oxfordshire: additional building, 1902

== Sources ==
- Colvin, H.M. (1997) [1954]. A Biographical Dictionary of British Architects, 1600–1840. New Haven: Yale University Press. p. 818. ISBN 0-300-07207-4.
- Sherwood, Jennifer; Pevsner, Nikolaus (1974). Oxfordshire. The Buildings of England. Harmondsworth: Penguin Books. pp. 560, 689, 809, 829. ISBN 0-14-071045-0.
- Tyack, Geoffrey (1998). Oxford An Architectural Guide. Oxford & New York: Oxford University Press. p. 267. ISBN 0-19-817423-3.
- Woolley, Liz (2010). "Industrial Architecture in Oxford, 1870 to 1914". Oxoniensia. LXXV. Oxfordshire Architectural and Historical Society: 67–96. ISSN 0308-5562.
