= Morley, Cheshire =

Coordinates: 53.34°N 2.27°W

Morley
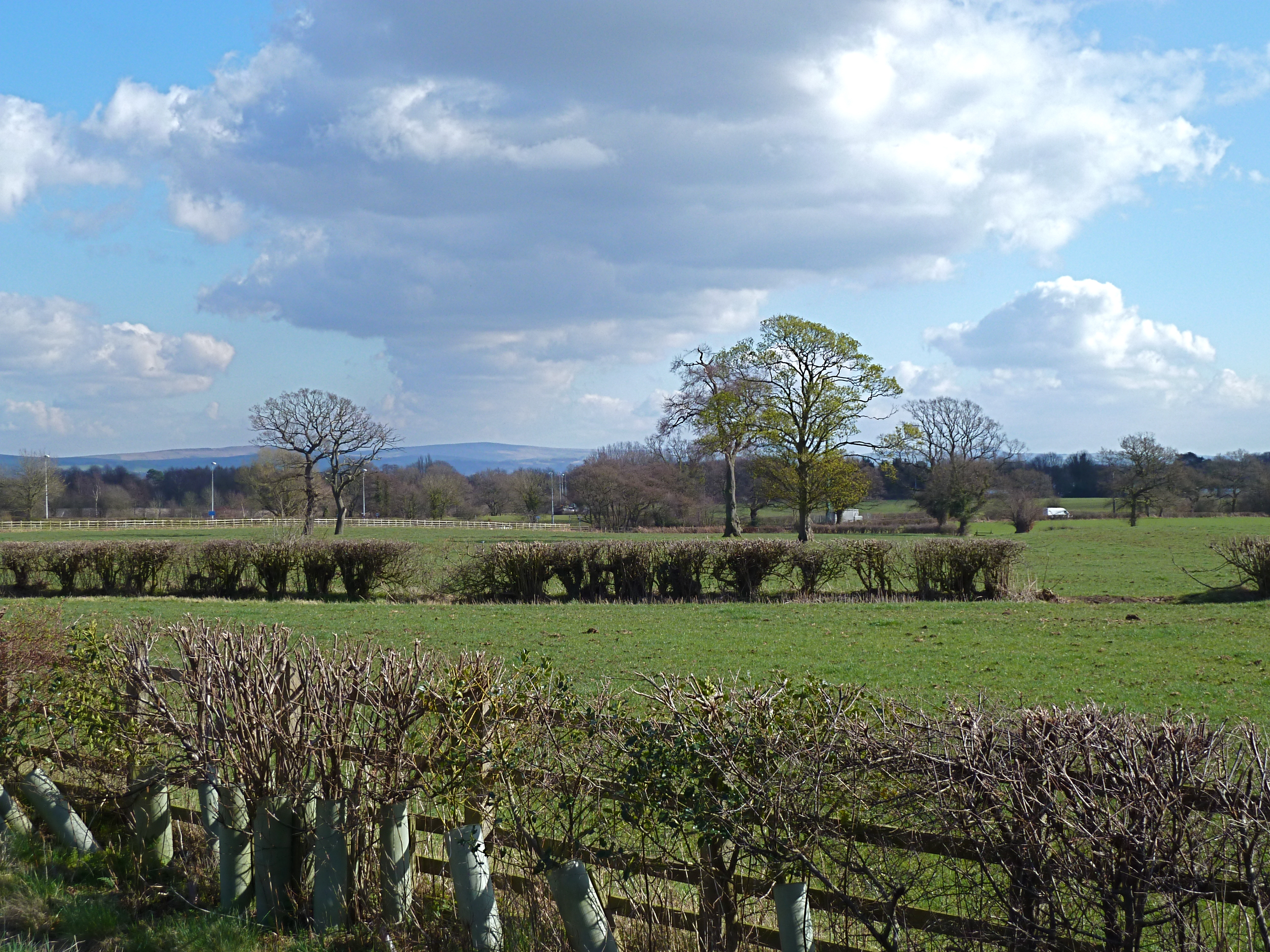
- Countryside at Morley

- Location within Cheshire
- OS grid reference: SJ820820
- Civil parish: Wilmslow
- Unitary authority: Cheshire East
- Ceremonial county: Cheshire
- Region: North West
- Country: England
- Sovereign state: United Kingdom
- Post town: WILMSLOW
- Postcode district: SK9
- Dialling code: 01625
- Police: Cheshire
- Fire: Cheshire
- Ambulance: North West
- UK Parliament: Tatton

Morley and Morley Green are neighbouring hamlets in Wilmslow, Cheshire, England. They are situated approximately 2 miles (3.2 km) north west of Wilmslow town centre. Until 1894 the area formed part of the parish of Pownall Fee.

Morley is formed from the lines of houses and farms on Morley Green Road and Altrincham Road. Morley Green is the hamlet at the junction of Morley Green Road and Mobberley Road. A Congregational church was opened in Morley Green in 1869; it closed in 2010.

== Local facilities ==
Morley Green Club
