= Samuel S. Morton House =

Historic house in Tennessee, United States

- U.S. National Register of Historic Places
- Location within Tennessee Location within the United States
- Location: Carters Creek Pike 3/10 mi. N of Bear Creek Rd., in or near Franklin, Tennessee
- Coordinates: 35°52′19″N 86°58′30″W
- Area: 3.4 acres (1.4 ha)
- Built: c. 1850, c. 1900 and c. 1910
- Architectural style: Greek Revival, Central passage plan
- MPS: Williamson County MRA
- NRHP reference No.: 88000365
- Added to NRHP: April 13, 1988

The Samuel S. Morton House is a property in Franklin, Tennessee that was listed on the National Register of Historic Places in 1988. It has also been known as Lillie House.

The listing included three contributing buildings and one contributing structure on 3.4 acres (1.4 ha).

The property's eligibility for NRHP listing was covered in a 1988 study of Williamson County historical resources.

== See also ==
- George W. Morton House, also NRHP-listed in Williamson County
