= Alice Bertha Moreton =

English artist

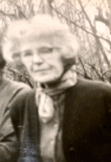
- Alice Bertha Moreton
- Born: Alice Bertha Tippin; 23 March 1901; Walton, Liverpool
- Died: 6 January 1977 (aged 75)
- Education: Bootle School of Art; Liverpool School of Art; Royal Academy Schools
- Known for: Painting, sculpture
- Spouse: John Moreton

Alice Bertha Moreton, née Tippin, (23 March 1901 – 6 January 1977) was an English sculptor, draughtsman and artist from Liverpool.

== Biography ==
Moreton was born in the Walton district of Liverpool where her father, David Tippin, was a builder and contractor. Her hobbies included riding, swimming and dancing. Moreton was originally self-taught, experimenting with art and sculpture in the years following her departure from Bootle Secondary School. She then spent a few years at the Bootle School of Art, before training at the Liverpool School of Art. Following this, she studied at the Royal Academy Schools from 1924 to 1928, where she exhibited many times. In her time there, she was taught by Sir William Reid Dick, George Frampton and Ernest Jackson, winning three silver and three bronze medals.

Moreton was most active as a sculptor and artist between 1924 and 1936, working from London and mainland Europe (France and Italy), as well as from her home town Liverpool. Her sculptures are in terracotta; her art is mainly pen and ink drawing, and watercolour. Before her marriage she signed her work A B. Tippin. After she married John Moreton in Walton, she signed her work A. Bertha Moreton. Moreton exhibited at the Paris Salon, Southport Arts Centre, Manchester Art Gallery, Walker Art Gallery, Merseyside Art Circle, Liverpool John Moores' Exhibition and at the Williamson Art Gallery and Museum. She was a member of the Liverpool Academy, Reynolds Club and Deeside Art Group. Her work has been displayed across Merseyside, in Cheshire Life magazine and in local papers, including the Liverpool Echo and the Liverpool Daily Post. Over her life, Moreton suffered a progressive loss of hearing. She was operated on, but this operation had detrimental effects. Her gravestone is in Willaston.

Her great-grandson is professional rugby player Charlie Matthews.

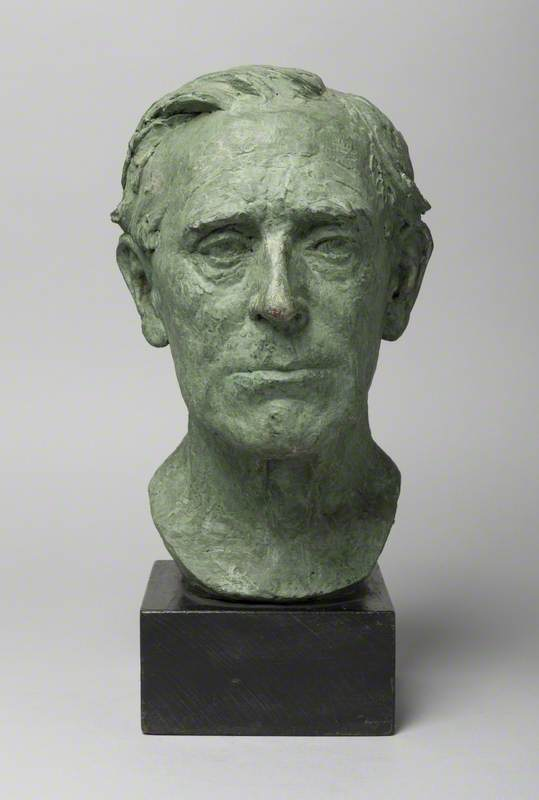
A bust of painter and influential teacher William C Penn, displayed in Williamson Art Gallery & Museum.

Honours and exhibitions (chronologically)
| Year | Honour/exhibit |
|---|---|
| 1922 | Won two scholarships and two studentships at the Liverpool School of Art. |
| 1924-1928 | Studied at the Royal Academy of Arts. In her time at the Royal Academy she won 3 travelling scholarships (to Rome, Venice and Paris), being awarded 3 silver medals and 3 bronze medals in the process. |
| 1925-36 | Exhibited three times with three different portrait heads at The Exhibition of the Royal Academy of Arts (Summer Exhibition), 1768. |
| 1925 | Won a 2-year Landseer Scholarship (Royal Academy of Arts), 1884–1950. |
| 1925 | Awarded a £5 first prize and a silver medal for two models of 'a bust from the life'. |
| 1926 | Awarded a second prize of £20 and a bronze medal for a model of a design of a subject combined with architecture, and a £10 prize and silver medal for a model for a medal or coin. |
| 1927 | Awarded a Landseer first prize of £30 and silver medal for a model of a design. |
| 1927 | Awarded another Landseer first prize of £30 and silver medal for a set of three models of a figure from the life. |
| 1927 | Awarded yet another two year Landseer Scholarship for sculpture, in 1927. |
| 1957 | Became a member of the Royal Cambrian Academy of Art. |

== Sources ==
- Annual Report from the Council of The Royal Academy to the General Assembly of Academicians for the Year 1924, 1925 Royal Academy Annual Reports; 20 February 1925; p. 32.
- Annual Report from the Council of The Royal Academy to the General Assembly of Academicians for the Year 1926, 1927 Royal Academy Annual Reports; 1927; p. 35.
- Annual Report from the Council of The Royal Academy to the General Assembly of Academicians for the Year 1927, 1928 Royal Academy Annual Reports; 1928; p. 38.
- Royal Academy Exhibitors 1905-70: A Dictionary of Artists and their Work in the Summer Exhibitions of the Royal Academy of Arts, Vol. VI SHERR-ZUL; 1982; p. 146
- 'Alice Bertha Tippin', Mapping the Practice and Profession of Sculpture in Britain and Ireland 1851–1951, University of Glasgow History of Art and HATII, online database 2011 [http://sculpture.gla.ac.uk/view/person.php?id=msib4_1263482925]
