= Moor End, County Durham =

Village in County Durham, England

Coordinates: 54°47′13″N 1°32′02″W

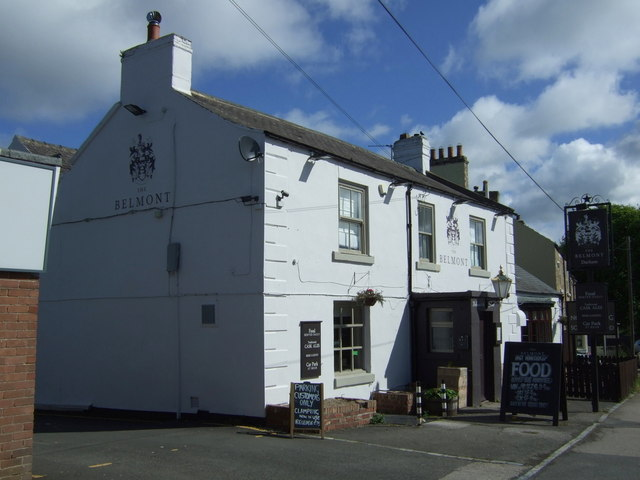
The Belmont, Moor End

Moor End is a place in County Durham, England. It is situated immediately to the east of Durham, close to Gilesgate Moor and Carrville. It is situated within the parish of Belmont and as Belmont and Carrville have expanded is now largely indistinct from its neighbours.
