= Moreton, Oxfordshire =

English placename

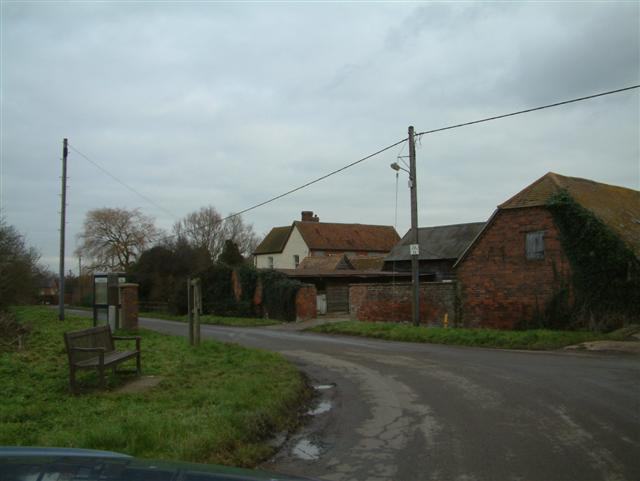
Roadside view in Moreton, South Oxfordshire

Moreton is an English placename meaning "farm in marshy land". There are several places in Oxfordshire, England, called "Moreton":

- The two neighbouring villages of North and South Moreton in the old Moreton Hundred.
- The hamlet (in previous times a larger village) of Moreton, a mile to the southwest of Northmoor, on Morton Lane at coordinates 51.71066°N 1.40721°W.
- The hamlet of Moreton, near Thame in South Oxfordshire.

The town of Moreton-in-Marsh (often referred to as Moreton) lies just over the border in Gloucestershire.

== See also ==
- Moreton Road in North Oxford
