= Moblake =

Hamlet in Cheshire, England

Coordinates: 52.995°N 2.48°W

- Location within Cheshire
- OS grid reference: SJ670430
- Civil parish: Buerton
- Unitary authority: Cheshire East
- Ceremonial county: Cheshire
- Region: North West
- Country: England
- Sovereign state: United Kingdom
- Post town: CREWE
- Postcode district: CW3
- Dialling code: 01270
- Police: Cheshire
- Fire: Cheshire
- Ambulance: North West
- UK Parliament: Chester South and Eddisbury

Moblake is a hamlet in Cheshire, England. It is situated on Longhill Lane, approximately 2 miles (3.2 km) east of the village of Audlem, just inside the boundary of the parish of Buerton, Cheshire East.
