= Moorgate, Norfolk =

Village in Norfolk, United Kingdom

Coordinates: 52.824°N 1.224°E

Moorgate is a hamlet in Blickling civil parish, Broadland district, north-west of Aylsham in the county of Norfolk, England. It is south of the River Bure.
