= Moreton Road =

Road in North Oxford, England

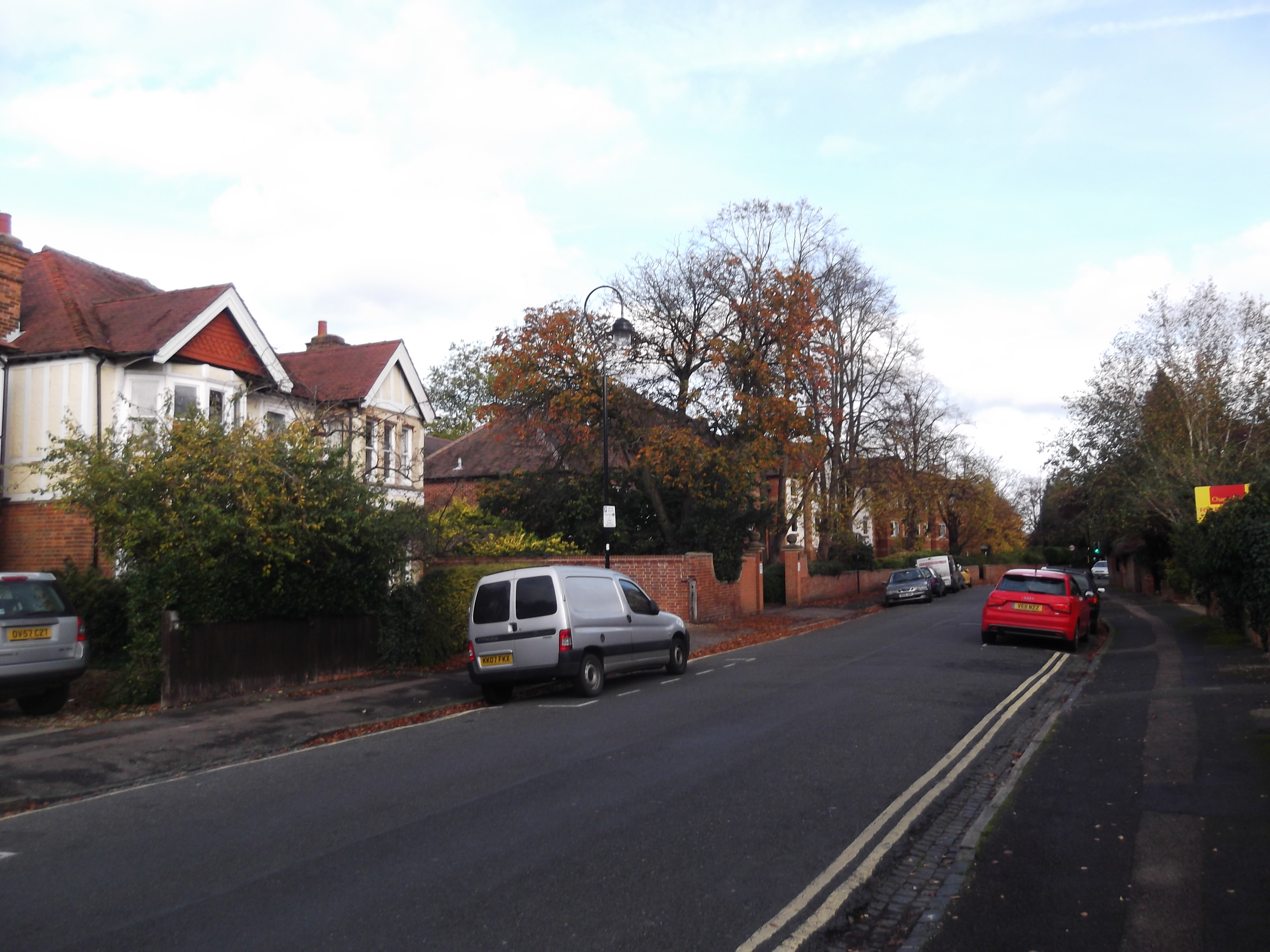
- View along Morton Road
- Interactive map of Moreton Road
- Namesake: Moreton, Oxfordshire
- Length: 264 m (866 ft)
- Location: Oxford, England
- Quarter: North Oxford
- Postal code: OX2 7AX
- Coordinates: 51.773463°N 1.265445°W
- West end: Woodstock Road (A4144)
- East end: Banbury Road (A4165); Marston Ferry Road (B4495)
- North: Beech Croft Road
- East: Banbury Road (A4165)
- South: Lathbury Road
- West: Woodstock Road (A4144)

Other
- Known for: Carmelite Convent

Moreton Road is a residential road in the Oxford suburb of North Oxford, Oxfordshire, United Kingdom.

== Location ==
The road runs east–west. At the western end of the road is a junction with Woodstock Road (A4144) and at the eastern end is a junction with Banbury Road (A4165), the two major arterial roads out of Oxford to the north. The road continues east slightly to the north on the Marston Ferry Road (B4495). To the south is Lathbury Road and to the north is Beech Croft Road. It lies to the north of the original North Oxford development by St John's College, Oxford, but since it is south of Summertown, it is often considered to be part of Central North Oxford, with high house prices.

On the corner of Moreton Road at 153 Banbury Road, there was a Carmelite Convent until 1987. The main site of St Clare's, an independent international boarding school founded in 1953, is also located at 139 Banbury Road, between Lathbury Road and Moreton Road.

== Notable people ==
A number of Oxford University academics have lived in Moreton Road. Frederick Mason Brewer CBE FRIC (1903–1963), Head of the Inorganic Chemistry Laboratory at the University of Oxford, and Mayor of Oxford during 1959–60, lived at 6 Moreton Road. The classical scholar and Fellow of University College, Oxford, George Cawkwell (1919–2019), and the legal scholar Sir Guenter Treitel (1928–2019), lived in Moreton Road.

== In popular culture ==
Moreton Road features in the eponymous biography about the Australian composer Peter Sculthorpe, who won a scholarship to study at Oxford University, and also in the novel Restless (winner of the Novel Award in the 2006 Costa Book Awards) by William Boyd.

== See also ==
- Moreton, Oxfordshire
