= Monkscross =

Coordinates: 50.523°N 4.282°W

- Location within Cornwall
- OS grid reference: SX383717
- Civil parish: Stokeclimsland
- Unitary authority: Cornwall
- Ceremonial county: Cornwall
- Region: South West
- Country: England
- Sovereign state: United Kingdom

Monkscross is a hamlet in the civil parish of Stokeclimsland, Cornwall, England.
