= Monkerton =

Hamlet in Devon, England

Coordinates: 50.736°N 3.469°W

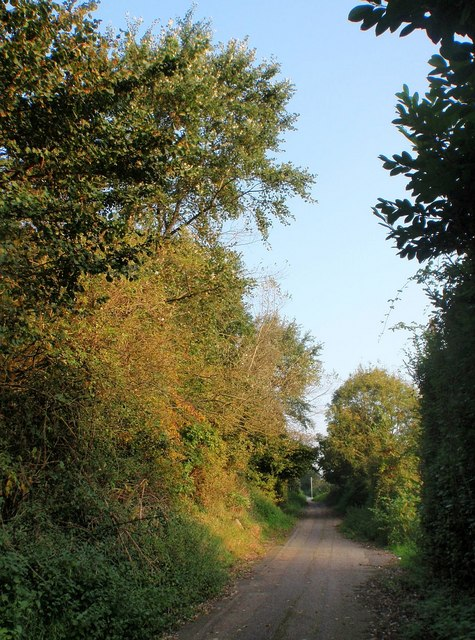
Pinn Lane, Monkerton, Devon.

Monkerton is a small hamlet located within the village of Pinhoe, 3 miles (4.8 km) east of Exeter in the county of Devon, England. It lies near Pinhoe railway station, which provides local rail connections.

Since 2015, Monkerton has undergone significant residential development, with multiple housing developers receiving planning permission to construct new properties. Barratt David Wilson received approval to build 178 housing units, comprising both private and affordable homes. Proposals have included integrating housing with the surrounding natural environment and enhancing local wildlife habitats.

An "engineering and mechanics" centre has also been established nearby by Exeter College, contributing to the area's educational infrastructure. Alongside other local amenities, this is considered a key factor in the growing appeal of Monkerton as a residential area.
