= George W. Morton House =

Historic house in Tennessee, United States

- George W. Moore House
- Formerly listed on the U.S. National Register of Historic Places
- Location within Tennessee Location within the United States
- Location: US Alt. 41 1/2 mi. N of Sunset Rd., Nolensville, Tennessee
- Coordinates: 35°57′58″N 86°40′33″W
- Area: 3.1 acres (1.3 ha)
- Built: c. 1870
- Architectural style: T-plan
- MPS: Williamson County MRA
- NRHP reference No.: 88000337

Significant dates
- Added to NRHP: April 13, 1988
- Removed from NRHP: July 20, 2020

The George W. Morton House is a property in Nolensville, Tennessee, United States, that was listed on the National Register of Historic Places in 1988. It was built c.1870.

The property's eligibility for NRHP listing was addressed in a 1988 study of Williamson County historical resources.

The site was relocated in Nolensville on February 4, 2019, after which time it was removed from the National Register.

== See also ==
- Samuel S. Morton House, also NRHP-listed in Williamson County
