= Morchard Road =

Hamlet in Devon, England

Coordinates: 50°49′46″N 3°46′30″W

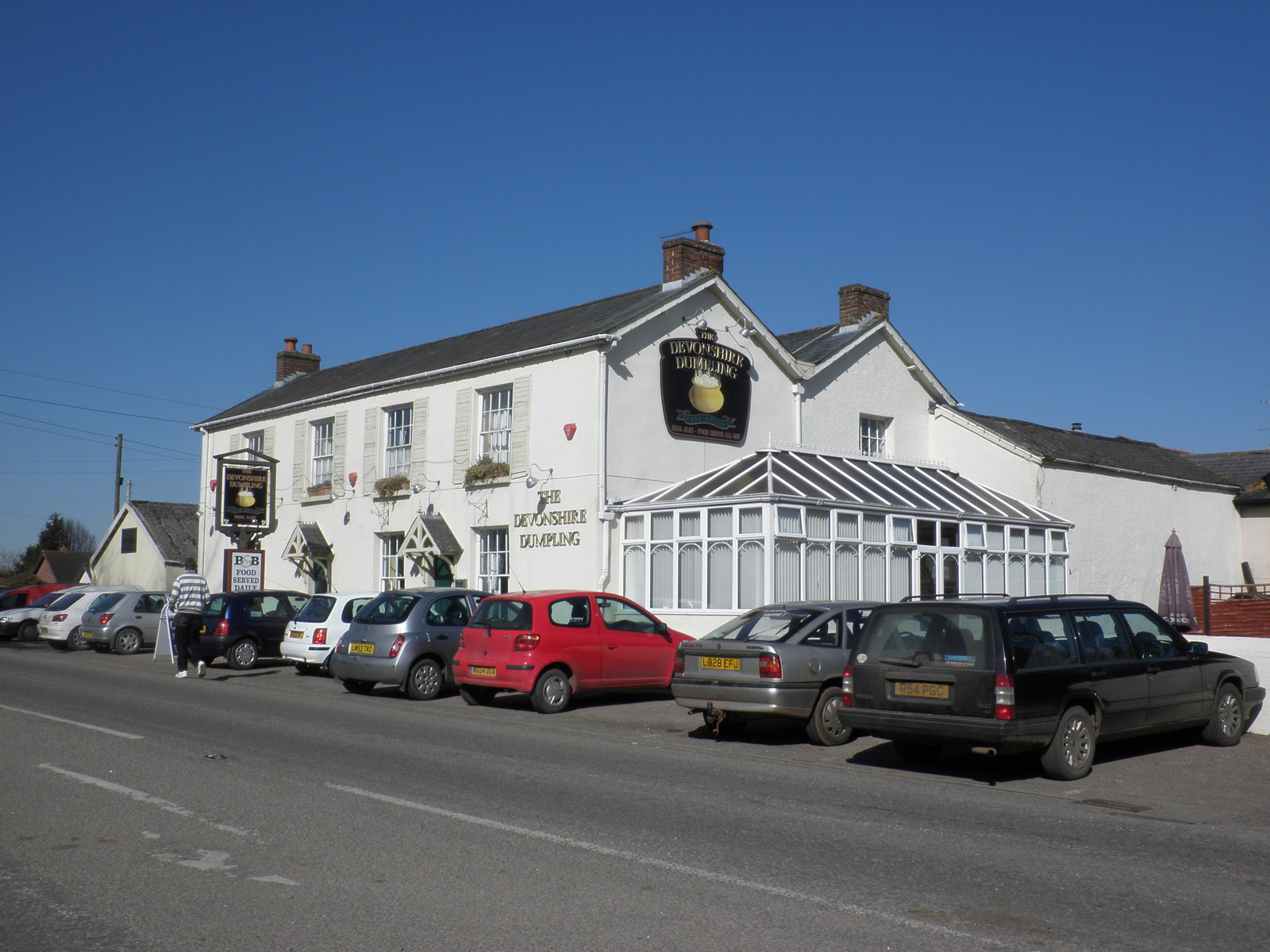
The Devonshire Dumpling

Morchard Road is a small hamlet in Down St Mary civil parish, mid Devon, UK. It has a pub, the Devonshire Dumpling. It also has a railway station on the Tarka Line running from Exeter to Barnstaple.

Morchard Road takes its name from the nearby settlement of Morchard Bishop.
