= Moreton, South Oxfordshire =

Hamlet in Oxfordshire, England

Coordinates: 51.739°N 0.995°W

Moreton
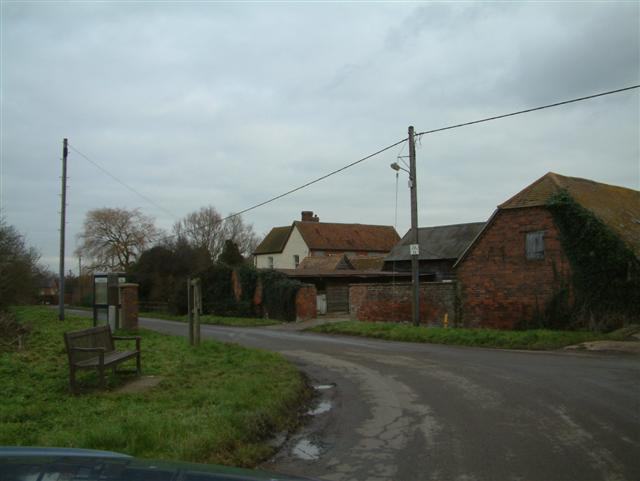
- View in Moreton

- Location within Oxfordshire
- OS grid reference: SP6904
- Civil parish: Thame
- District: South Oxfordshire
- Shire county: Oxfordshire
- Region: South East
- Country: England
- Sovereign state: United Kingdom
- Post town: Thame
- Postcode district: OX9
- Dialling code: 01844
- Police: Thames Valley
- Fire: Oxfordshire
- Ambulance: South Central
- UK Parliament: Henley

Moreton is a hamlet 1 mile (1.6 km) southwest of Thame in Oxfordshire, England. (Moreton should not be confused with North Moreton and South Moreton, larger and unrelated South Oxfordshire villages between Wallingford and Didcot.)

== History ==
Moreton has been in existence as long as Thame, being mentioned with it in the Domesday Book of 1086. In the past, the main occupation of the inhabitants was farming, there being at least seven farms and more than 30 cottages, the majority housing the farm labourers. A decline in agriculture greatly reduced the size of the village and eventually led to the closure of the Methodist chapel, the school, and the shop. The bottom of the decline came in the 1950s, and today there are about 50 houses and cottages, plus two farms and a smallholding, all family-owned and run. The majority of Moreton’s older buildings cluster at the east end of the hamlet, surrounding the green and the two ponds. They then trail thinly up to the war memorial, which was erected in 1920. Beyond the war memorial is a small but mixed collection of houses.

To car users Moreton only has one road in and the same road out (plus two extremely low-grade but passable back roads, one to the nearby village of Tetsworth and another to the Oxfordshire Golf Resort), but its roads were passable once. Until well into the 18th century, the main thoroughfare from Aylesbury to Tetsworth and Wallingford ran through Moreton, via today's Moreton Lane in Thame. The needlemakers of Long Crendon made use of this road twice a year to send their goods by stagecoach for sale in London. Before that, it was used by the Roundheads, who would have passed through carrying the mortally wounded John Hampden from the Battle of Chalgrove Field to Thame in 1643.

Like many villages and towns in Oxfordshire, Moreton was pillaged during the English Civil War. This era is the one that appears to have produced the ‘troubled spirit’ that haunts Brook Cottage. The various happenings were recorded by Mr. Ron Mott, who was born in the cottage. He remembers his parents occasionally referring to hearing the ‘Old Man’s’ rat-tat on the door and heavy footsteps on the brick path outside. Until early in the 20th century, Moreton had two public houses: the Bell at one end and the Royal Oak at the other. Both have since closed and are now private houses.

== See also ==
- Moreton, Oxfordshire

== Sources ==
- Oxfordshire Federation of Women's Institutes (1990). The New Oxfordshire Village Book. Villages of Britain. Countryside Books. ISBN 1-85306-090-9.
- "The history of the village Moreton, near Thame, Oxfordshire". www.connellmarketing.co.uk. Archived from the original on 21 May 2018.
