= Cowleaze =

Cowleaze may refer to:

- Cowleaze Chine, a geographical feature on the Isle of Wight, England
- Cowleaze Wood, an area of woodland in south England
