= Emmington =

Village in Oxfordshire, England

Coordinates: 51.715°N 0.928°W

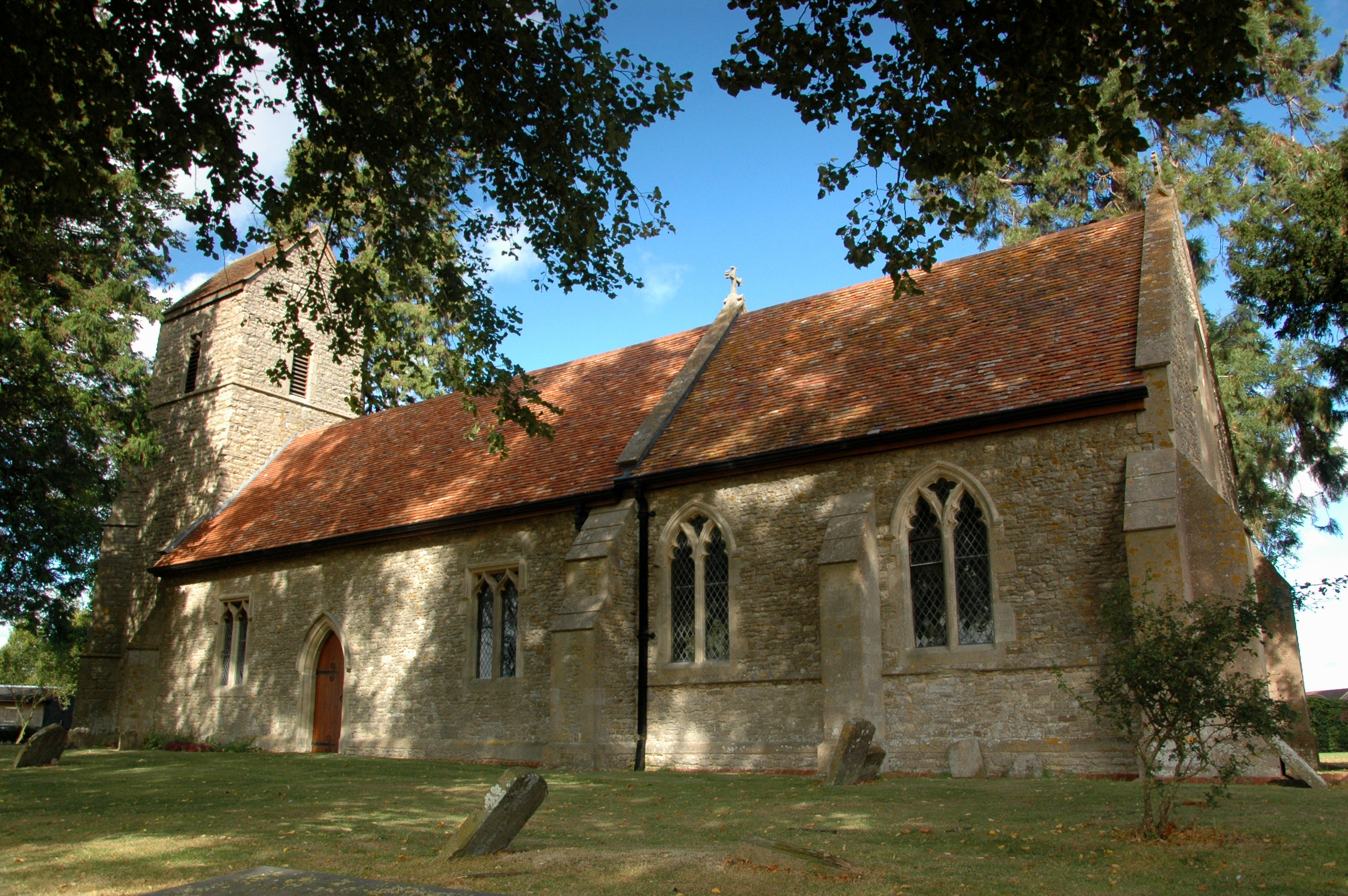
- Parish church of St Nicholas

- Location within Oxfordshire
- OS grid reference: SP7402
- Civil parish: Chinnor
- District: South Oxfordshire
- Shire county: Oxfordshire
- Region: South East
- Country: England
- Sovereign state: United Kingdom
- Post town: Chinnor
- Postcode district: OX39
- Dialling code: 01844
- Police: Thames Valley
- Fire: Oxfordshire
- Ambulance: South Central
- UK Parliament: Henley

Emmington is a village in the civil parish of Chinnor, in the South Oxfordshire district, in the county of Oxfordshire, England. It is about 4.5 miles (7 km) southeast of Thame. In 1931 the parish had a population of 41. On 1 April 1932 the parish was abolished and merged with Chinnor.

== Manor ==
The Domesday Book of 1086 records Emmington:

"William Peverel holds 10 hides in Emmington. Land for 5 ploughs. Now in demesne are 2 ploughs and six slaves and 10 villans and 4 bordars with 5 ploughs. There are 12 acres of meadow. It was worth £6 now £7. Alwine held these two estates freely."

The Manor was held by the Sackville family from about 1200, when it was held by Geoffrey de Sackville, until 1577, when Sir Thomas Sackville, (later Earl of Dorset), sold it to Sir George Peckham. In 1586, William Hampden (cousin and executor of John Hampden) acquired the Manor, and it was passed down through the Hampden family until 1665, when Richard Hampden sold it a London merchant, Henry Ashhurst. In 1805, the Manor was sold to the Wykeham family, and finally in 1929 was sold to Magdalen College, Oxford.

== Parish church ==
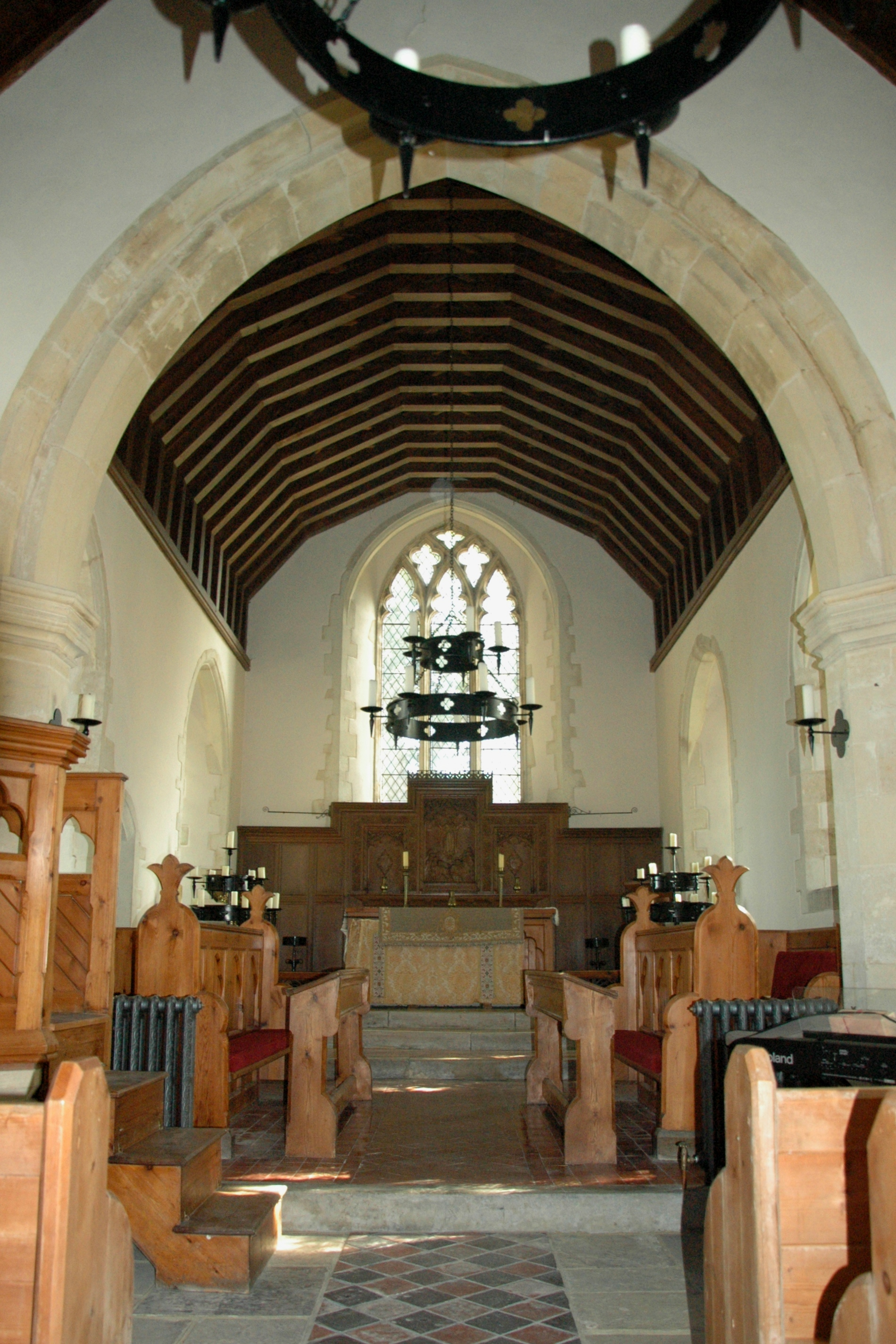
View from St Nicholas' nave, looking toward the chancel

Emmington has had a parish priest since at least 1190. Demolition work in 1873 discovered what was believed to be Norman masonry, suggesting that the original parish church was on the same site as the present Church of England parish church of Saint Nicholas. The building was largely rebuilt in the 14th century, and the belltower and several Decorated Gothic features survive from this time. In 1874 the chancel and nave were partly rebuilt under the direction of the Gothic Revival architects Charles Buckeridge and J.L. Pearson.

The tower has three bells. The oldest is the second bell, which John Appowell of Buckingham cast in about 1550. Joseph Carter of Reading, Berkshire cast the tenor in 1584. Henry II Knight, also of Reading, cast the treble bell in 1664. St Nicholas' also has a Sanctus bell that Thomas Chandler of Drayton Parslow cast in 1723. The Chandler family cast bells from 1635 until 1726 but this is the only surviving bell recorded as being cast by Thomas Chandler. St Nicholas' is a Grade II* listed building.

Emmington is in the parish of St Andrew, Chinnor, which is part of the Benefice of Chinnor, Sydenham, Aston Rowant and Crowell. St Nicholas' church was closed in 1987 and reopened for worship in 1991. In 2003 it was declared redundant and closed again, and it is now privately owned.

== 2016 earthquake ==
In March 2016 an earthquake centred on Emmington was felt for miles around.

== Sources ==
- Lobel, Mary D., ed. (1964). A History of the County of Oxford: Volume 8: Lewknor and Pyrton Hundreds. Victoria County History. pp. 91–98.
- Sherwood, Jennifer; Pevsner, Nikolaus (1974). Oxfordshire. The Buildings of England. Harmondsworth: Penguin Books. p. 592. ISBN 0-14-071045-0.
