= Lewknor =

Village in Oxfordshire, England

Coordinates: 51.672°N 0.967°W

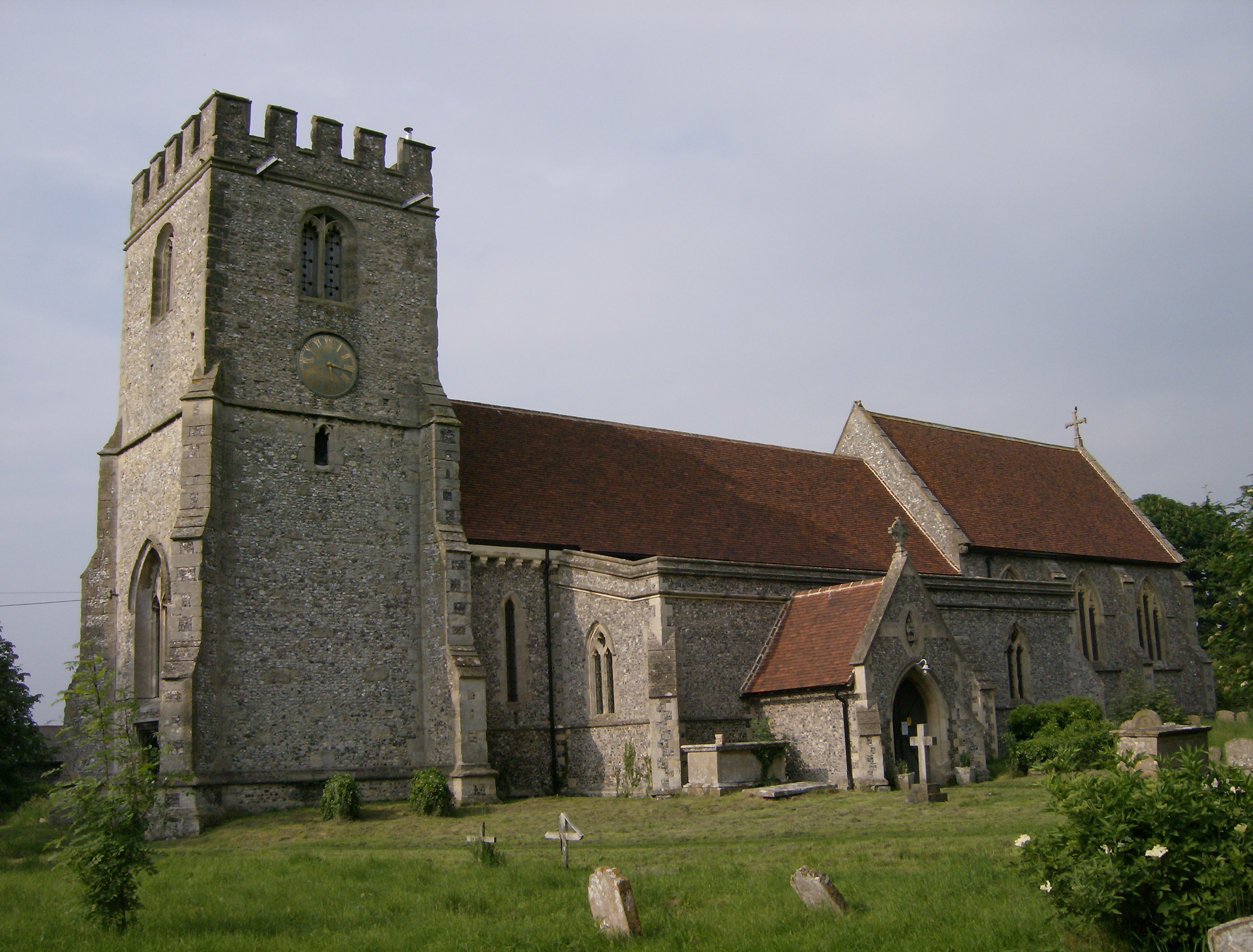
- St. Margaret's parish church

- Location within Oxfordshire
- Area: 13.13 km^{2} (5.07 sq mi)
- Population: 663 (parish, including Postcombe and South Weston) (2011 Census)
  - Density: 50/km^{2} (130/sq mi)
- OS grid reference: SU7197
- Civil parish: Lewknor
- District: South Oxfordshire
- Shire county: Oxfordshire
- Region: South East
- Country: England
- Sovereign state: United Kingdom
- Post town: Watlington
- Postcode district: OX49
- Dialling code: 01844
- Police: Thames Valley
- Fire: Oxfordshire
- Ambulance: South Central
- UK Parliament: Henley and Thame
- Website: Lewknor Parish Council

Lewknor is a village and civil parish about 5 miles (8 km) south of Thame in Oxfordshire. The civil parish includes the villages of Postcombe and South Weston. The 2011 Census recorded the parish's population as 663.

== Early history ==
=== Iron Age and Roman era ===
Two ancient roads pass through the parish: the ancient Icknield Way at the foot of the Chiltern Hills escarpment and The Ridgeway along the top. Both have been roads since at least the Iron Age. Early in the 1970s archaeological investigations prior to building of the M40 motorway through the parish found traces of a Romano-British settlement near the village and a Romano-British cemetery near Icknield Way.

=== Saxon era and Middle Ages ===
Lewknor is a Saxon spring line settlement near the foot of the Chilterns chalk escarpment. The toponym is derived from the Old English name of its owner Leofeca, recorded in a lawsuit in AD 990. In the 11th century the manor of Luvechenora was held by Edith of Wessex, who in 1045 became queen consort of Edward the Confessor. The manor then passed to a Danish thegn of King Edward called Tovi, who bequeathed it to Abingdon Abbey. For most of the Middle Ages the abbey leased out Lewknor manor, until the abbey was suppressed in 1538 in the dissolution of the monasteries. All Souls College, Oxford had become a major landowner in the parish before the end of the 17th century and has remained so until modern times.

Church Farm has a timber-framed barn that is mid- or late-14th-century. There have been suggestions that it is a former Medieval hall-house, but they have been disputed. It is a Grade I listed building. Early in the 1970s archaeological investigations prior to building of the M40 motorway through the parish found traces of a large Medieval farmhouse high in the Chilterns in the east of the parish, on the alignment onto which the Christmas Common road was to be diverted.

== Parish church ==
Documentary and architectural evidence indicates the Church of England parish church was built some time after 1146 and before 1200. It was dedicated to Saint Mary but at some date was rededicated to Saint Margaret. It was originally a cruciform building with a chancel, nave, north and south chapels and a west tower. The chancel arch, north chapel, two lancet windows in the nave, the font and some other features survive from this time.

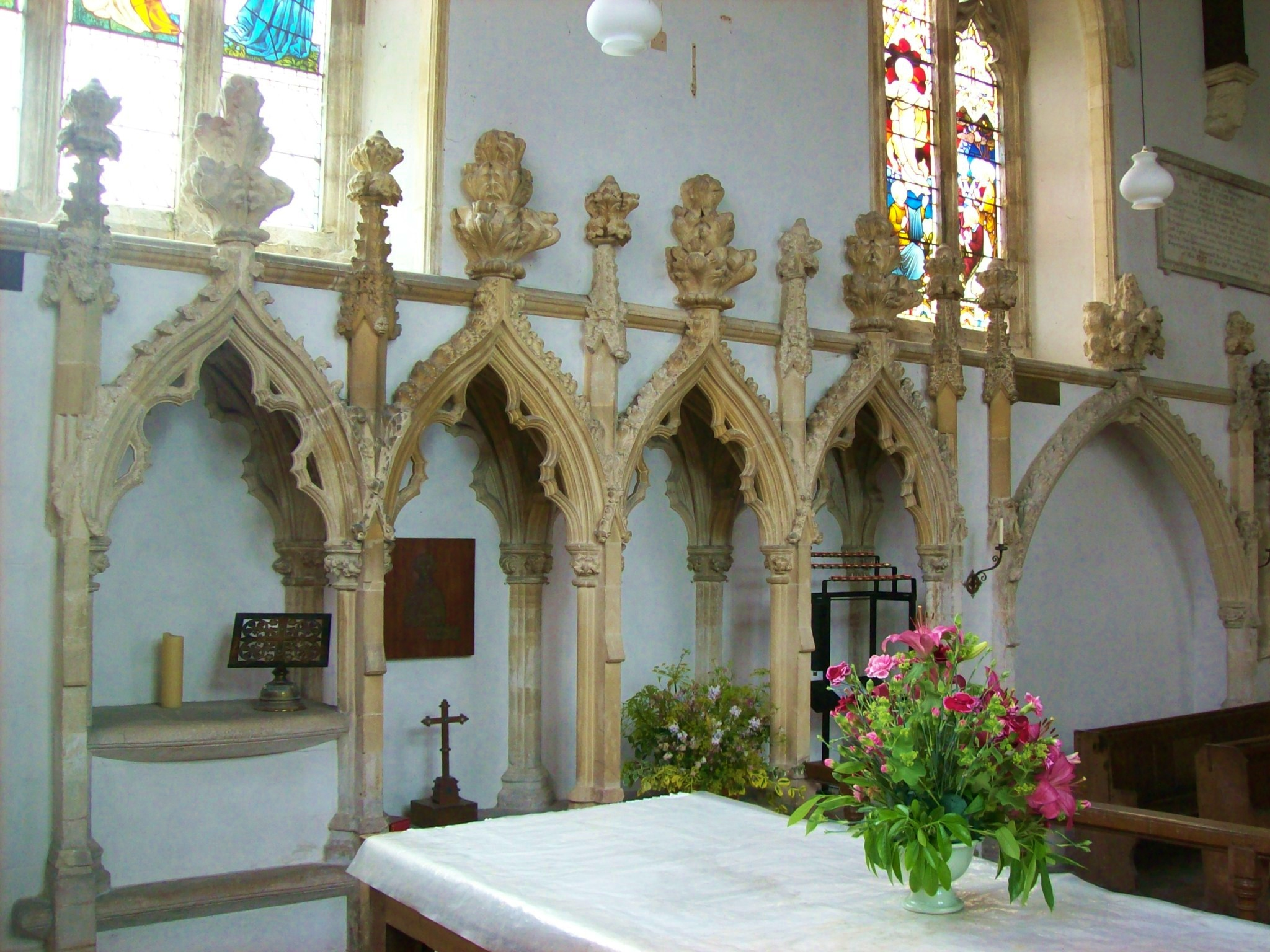
14th-century Decorated Gothic piscina and sedilia in the chancel of St Margaret's parish church

Early in the 14th century the building was enlarged in the Decorated Gothic style with a south aisle that absorbed the south chapel, and the chancel was enlarged and received new windows including the present east window. In the chancel is a memorial effigy of a lady that also dates from the 14th century.

In the 15th century a new Perpendicular Gothic west tower was built. In 1553 the tower was recorded as having four bells and a Sanctus bell. The four bells were replaced by a ring of five cast by Ellis I Knight of Reading, Berkshire in 1636. The Sanctus bell was replaced with a bell cast in 1744, possibly by Henry III Bagley of Chacombe, Northamptonshire, who at the time had a foundry in Witney. In 1950 the ring was increased to six with the addition of a new treble bell cast by Mears and Stainbank of the Whitechapel Bell Foundry.

In 1845 All Souls College paid for the chancel to be restored. In 1863 the nave was restored, re-roofed and had two more windows inserted under the direction of the Gothic Revival architect Arthur Blomfield. Two windows in the chancel have Pre-Raphaelite stained glass that Pevsner and Sherwood attribute to William Morris. The church is a Grade I listed building.

== Social and economic history ==
Lewknor was a strip parish that historically included three townships or divisions: Lewknor, Postcombe and Lewknor Uphill. Lewknor Uphill consisted of three detached parts in the Chiltern Hills: Ackhampstead, Cadmore End and Studdridge. Ackhampstead was transferred to Buckinghamshire by the Counties (Detached Parts) Act 1844. Cadmore End became a separate parish in 1852 and Studdridge was transferred to Stokenchurch, but both places remained in Oxfordshire until they were transferred to Buckinghamshire in 1896.

=== Inclosure ===
Lewknor and Postcomb Inclosures Act 1810
- Act of Parliament
- Parliament of the United Kingdom
- Long title: An Act for inclosing Lands in the Divisions of Lewknor and Postcomb, in the Parish of Lewknor in the County of Oxford.
- Citation: 50 Geo. 3. c. clvii

Dates
- Royal assent: 2 June 1810

Text of statute as originally enacted

An open field system prevailed in the parish until the Georgian era. The first Inclosure Bill for the parish was moved in Parliament in 1792 but the Earl of Macclesfield opposed it and it was defeated. A second Lewknor and Postcombe Bill was passed as the Lewknor and Postcomb Inclosures Act 1810 (50 Geo. 3. c. clvii), and was put into effect in 1815.

=== School ===
In 1836 All Souls College paid for a village school to be built next to the churchyard. This became a National School. In 1929 it was reorganised as a junior school, and senior pupils from the village were thereafter schooled at Chinnor. From 1859 the school was vested in the Vicar and churchwardens, and since 1950 it has been a voluntary controlled school.

=== Transport ===
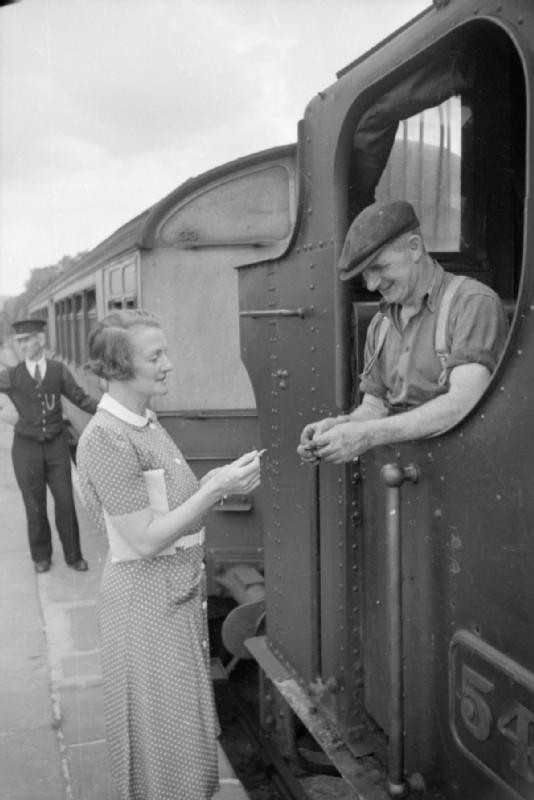
At nearby Aston Rowant station in 1941, village school mistress Mrs Scott sells War Savings stamps to locomotive driver Bill Hopkins

In 1869–72 the Watlington and Princes Risborough Railway was built through the parish. It ran right past the village but the nearest station it provided was 1 mile (1.6 km) away at Aston Rowant. The Great Western Railway took over the line in 1883 and built Lewknor Bridge Halt right next to the village in 1906. British Railways withdrew passenger services and closed the halt in 1957. Aston Rowant remained open for freight only until 1961, when British Railways withdrew this service and removed the track south of Chinnor cement works.

Early in the 1920s the Watlington — Chinnor road through the village was classified B4009. In 1974 the M40 motorway was built through the parish, passing just east of the village on an embankment. A bridge carries the embankment over the former railway trackbed, which has been reused to divert the B4009 to bypass the village. (This diversion also resulted in the staggered junction between the A40 and diverted B4009). M40 junction 6 between the motorway and the B road was formed here. South of the village the motorway climbs the Chiltern escarpment in a cutting up to 150 feet (46 m) deep with steep chalk faces. The minor road linking Christmas Common with the A40 road near Stokenchurch was diverted slightly eastwards which is now carried across the cutting on a bridge formed of a single concrete arch 180 feet (55 m) wide. Lewknor Turn on the M40 is a stop on the Oxford Tube coach service, which provides the village with frequent non-stop coach services to Oxford and London.

== Air crash ==
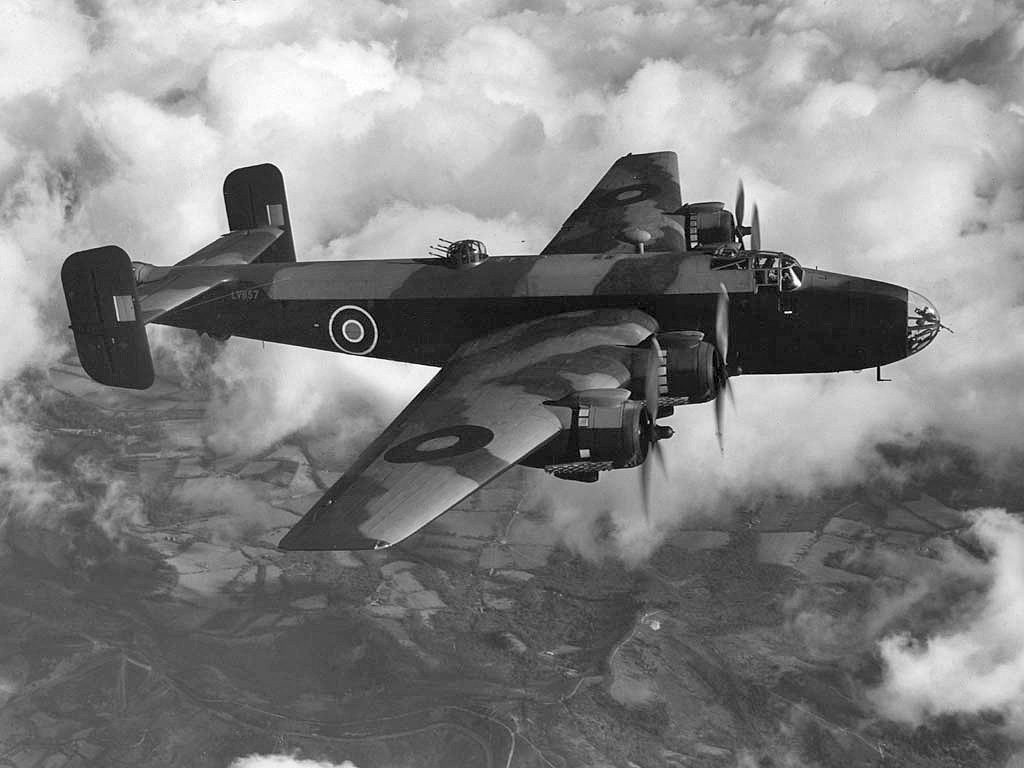
Handley Page Halifax Mk III similar to LW579, which crashed in Cowleaze Wood in 1944

On 31 March 1944 a Handley Page Halifax Mk III bomber aircraft, LW579 of No. 51 Squadron RAF, was returning from the Nuremberg Raid when it crashed in Cowleaze Wood, in the Chiltern Hills about 1 1/2 miles (2.4 km) southeast of Lewknor village, killing all seven of its crew. LW579 was based at RAF Snaith in the East Riding of Yorkshire and seems to have been at least 120 miles (190 km) off course. It was a clear, moonlit night, and it is not clear why the Halifax lost height and crashed into the hill. There is a monument in Cowleaze Wood to the crew of LW579. In 2015 BBC Radio Oxford broadcast a documentary about the crash, the crew and some of their surviving relatives.

== Area of Outstanding Natural Beauty ==
In 1965 the Chilterns including the escarpment and hills in the parish were declared an Area of Outstanding Natural Beauty. On the escarpment on either side of the motorway is Aston Rowant National Nature Reserve, which despite its name is partly in Lewknor parish. The reserve has beech woodlands, chalk grassland supporting diverse rare plants and butterflies, and is one of the best places in England to see red kites.

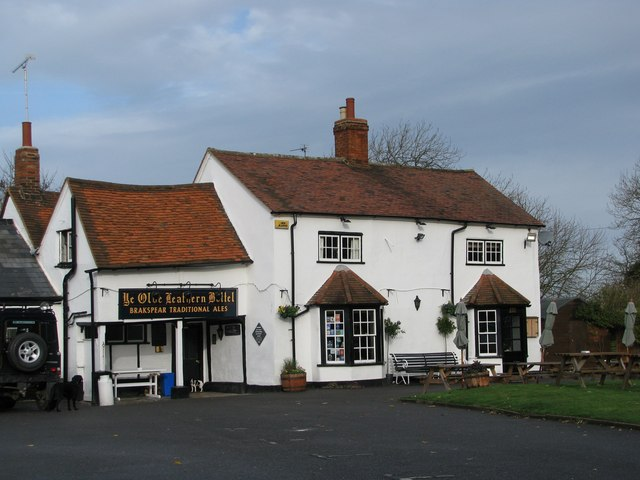
The Leathern Bottle pub

== Amenities ==
Lewknor has a 17th-century pub, the Leathern Bottle, controlled by Brakspear Brewery.

== Sources and further reading ==
- Chambers, RA (1973). "A Cemetery Site at Beacon Hill, near Lewknor" (PDF). Oxoniensia. XXXVIII. Oxfordshire Architectural and Historical Society: 138–145. ISSN 0308-5562.
- Chambers, RA (1973). "A Deserted Medieval Farmstead at Sadler's Wood, Lewknor" (PDF). Oxoniensia. XXXVIII. Oxfordshire Architectural and Historical Society: 146–167. ISSN 0308-5562.
- Chambers, RA (1973). "An Iron Age Enclosure at Hailey Wood, Lewknor" (PDF). Oxoniensia. XXXVIII. Oxfordshire Architectural and Historical Society: 168–173. ISSN 0308-5562.
- Chambers, RA (1976). "The Cemetery Site at Beacon Hill, near Lewknor, Oxon. 1972 (M40 Site 12): An Inventory of the Inhumations and a Re-appraisal" (PDF). Oxoniensia. XLI. Oxfordshire Architectural and Historical Society: 77–85. ISSN 0308-5562.
- Fasham, Peter J (1973). "Excavations near Lewknor, 1971–2" (PDF). Oxoniensia. XXXVIII. Oxfordshire Architectural and Historical Society: 124–137. ISSN 0308-5562.
- Fletcher, John (1975). "The Medieval Hall at Lewknor" (PDF). Oxoniensia. XL. Oxfordshire Architectural and Historical Society: 247–253. ISSN 0308-5562.
- Gill, Jonathan (2009). Church Farm, Lewknor, Oxfordshire, OX9 5TP. Oxford: Oxford Archaeological Unit Ltd.
- Lobel, Mary D, ed. (1964). A History of the County of Oxford. Victoria County History. Vol. 8: Lewknor and Pyrton Hundreds. London: Oxford University Press for the Institute of Historical Research. pp. 98–115.
- Morrey, MCJ; Smith, JT (1973). "The 'Great Barn', Lewknor: The Architectural Evidence" (PDF). Oxoniensia. XXXVIII. Oxfordshire Architectural and Historical Society: 339–345. ISSN 0308-5562.
- Oppitz, Leslie (2000). Lost Railways of the Chilterns. Newbury: Countryside Books. pp. 20–23. ISBN 1-85306-643-5.
- Sherwood, Jennifer; Pevsner, Nikolaus (1974). Oxfordshire. The Buildings of England. Harmondsworth: Penguin Books. pp. 683–684. ISBN 0-14-071045-0.
- Turner, Hilary L (1972). "The 'Great Barn', Lewknor: The Documentary Evidence" (PDF). Oxoniensia. XXXVII. Oxford Architectural and Historical Society: 187–191. ISSN 0308-5562.
