= South Weston =

Village in Oxfordshire, England

Coordinates: 51.679°N 0.989°W

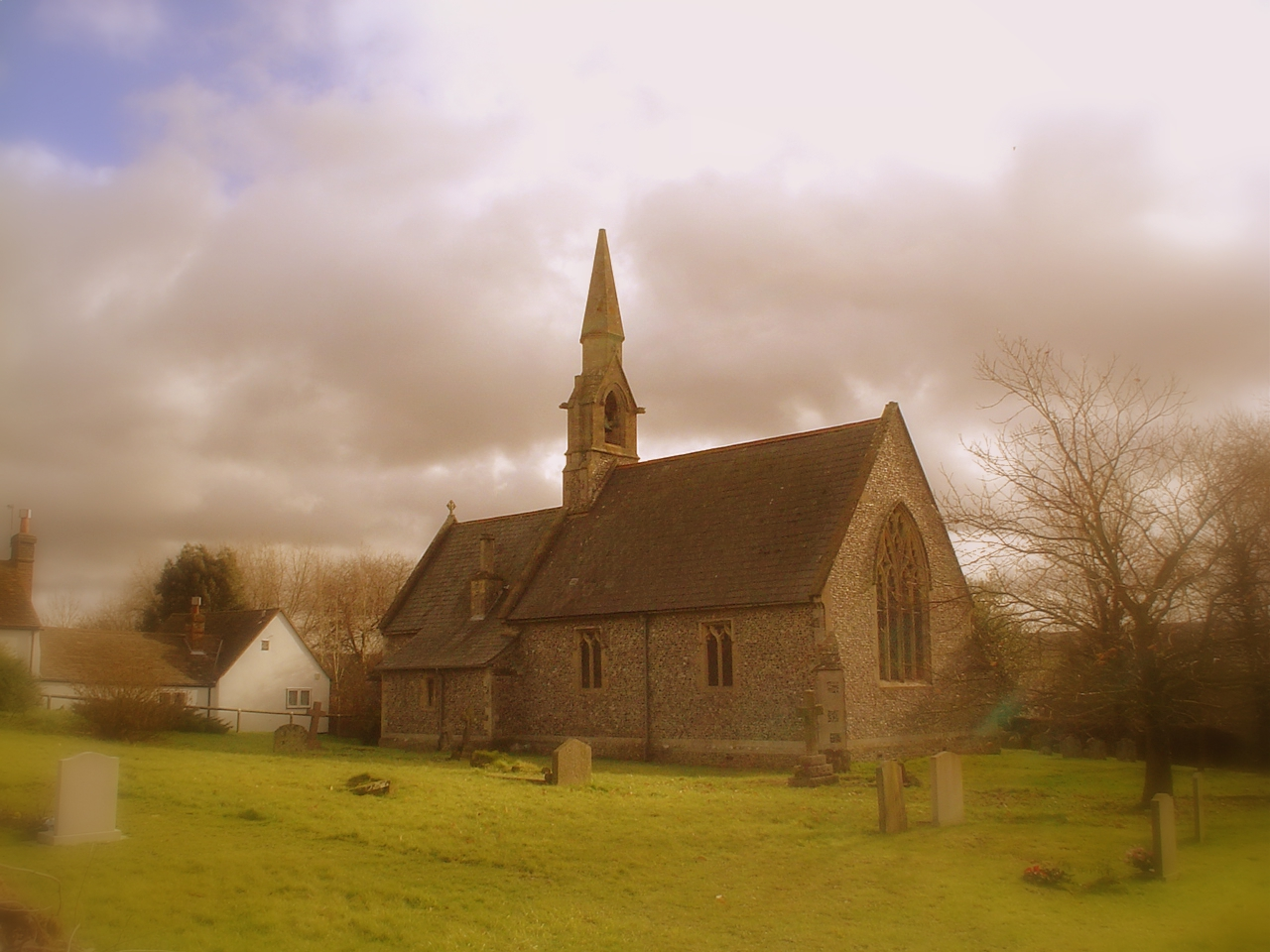
- St. Lawrence' parish church

- Location within Oxfordshire
- OS grid reference: SU700983
- Civil parish: Lewknor
- District: South Oxfordshire
- Shire county: Oxfordshire
- Region: South East
- Country: England
- Sovereign state: United Kingdom
- Post town: Thame
- Postcode district: OX9
- Dialling code: 01844
- Police: Thames Valley
- Fire: Oxfordshire
- Ambulance: South Central
- UK Parliament: Henley
- Website: Lewknor Village

South Weston is a village in the civil parish of Lewknor, in the South Oxfordshire district of Oxfordshire, England. It is about 4.5 miles (7 km) south of Thame.

== History ==
The manor of South Weston is recorded in the Domesday Book of 1086 and the Hundred Rolls of 1279. Both then and later in the Middle Ages, the parish's farming interests overlapped with those of neighbouring Wheatfield.

South Weston was an ancient parish in the Pyrton hundred of Oxfordshire. In 1954 the parish was abolished and its area absorbed into the neighbouring parish of Lewknor. At the 1951 census (the last before the abolition of the civil parish), South Weston had a population of 61.

== Parish church ==
The current Church of England parish church of Saint Lawrence was designed by the Gothic Revival architect R.C. Hussey and built in 1860. It is in a Decorated Gothic style and incorporates some elements of the previous Norman church. The font is 13th century, and there is a 14th-century tomb recess in the north wall of the chancel. Over the east window, on the outside is a statue of Saint Lawrence.

The armchairs in the church were given by the Reynardson family of Adwell. The church was renovated in 1988 to make it more suitable for holding services. Until the mid 19th century the church had strong links with The Queen's College, Oxford.

== Salisbury Lodge ==
The Salisbury Arms

In South Weston a non-conformist chapel and a public house were built in about 1600. The pub was called The Salisbury Arms. After the chapel became unused, the chapel was converted into a barn for the use of the pub owners. The pub was converted into a house in 1982 and is now called Salisbury Lodge.

== Sources and further reading ==
- Fanshawe, Rev. H.L.; Henderson, Canon W.H. Church of Saint Lawrence South Weston.
- Lobel, Mary D, ed. (1969). A History of the County of Oxford: Volume 8: Lewknor and Pyrton Hundreds. Victoria County History. pp. 253–262.
- Sherwood, Jennifer; Pevsner, Nikolaus (1974). Oxfordshire. The Buildings of England. Harmondsworth: Penguin Books. p. 774. ISBN 0-14-071045-0.
