= Crowell, Oxfordshire =

Village in Oxfordshire, England

Coordinates: 51.691°N 0.925°W

Crowell
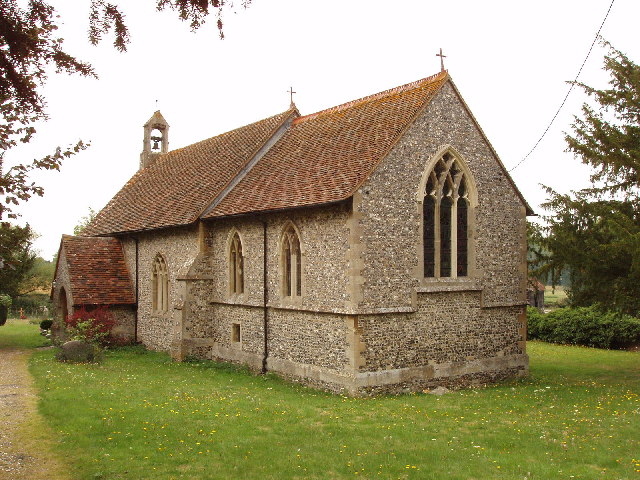
- Parish church of the Nativity of the Blesséd Virgin Mary

- Location within Oxfordshire
- Population: 100 (2001 census)
- OS grid reference: SU744997
- Civil parish: Crowell
- District: South Oxfordshire
- Shire county: Oxfordshire
- Region: South East
- Country: England
- Sovereign state: United Kingdom
- Post town: Chinnor
- Postcode district: OX39
- Dialling code: 01844
- Police: Thames Valley
- Fire: Oxfordshire
- Ambulance: South Central
- UK Parliament: Henley and Thame
- Website: Crowell Parish Meeting

Crowell is a village and civil parish in the South Oxfordshire district, in Oxfordshire, England, about 4 miles (6.4 km) southeast of the market town of Thame and 1 mile (1.6 km) southwest of the village of Chinnor. The 2001 census recorded the parish's population as 100. Crowell village is a spring line settlement at the source of a stream called the Pleck at the foot of the Chiltern Hills escarpment. The toponym "Crowell" is derived from the Old English for "crow's spring" or "crow's stream".

Crowell is a strip parish about 3 miles (5 km) long on a northwest – southeast axis and less than 1/2-mile (800 m) wide at its widest point. The northwest part of the strip is low-lying land in the Vale of Oxford about 350 feet (110 m) above sea level; the southeast part of the strip is in the Chilterns and rises to 774 feet (236 m) above sea level. The southeastern part of the parish is bounded on three sides by Buckinghamshire.

== Archaeology ==
The Lower Icknield Way forms the low-lying northwestern boundary of the parish and The Ridgeway traverses the upland southeastern part. An earthwork about 750 yards (690 m) long on a north – south axis ascends the Chiltern escarpment in Crowellhill Wood.

== Manor ==
The Domesday Book records that before the Norman Conquest of England one Alwin held the manors of Crowell and Emmington but by 1086 the Norman knight William Peverel held both estates. Crowell passed to Peverel's son-in-law Richard de Redvers (d. 1107) and then descended with his heirs the Earls of Devon until at least 1375. By 1376 it was effectively part of the Honour of Wallingford, which in 1540 became part of the Honour of Ewelme. Crowell remained part of the latter honour until the 18th century.

== Parish church ==
The Church of England parish church of the Nativity of the Blesséd Virgin Mary is a small flint building. The church existed by the middle of the 12th century and the blocked-up Norman north doorway survives from this time. In the 13th century the chancel arch was rebuilt and the present south doorway was added. In the 14th century the chancel was rebuilt, made taller than the nave and given Decorated Gothic windows. The internal and external fabric of the building were repaired and renewed several times in the 17th and 18th centuries and notably in 1835–39 by one Richard Clark of Wallingford, whose work included renewal of the box pews and three-decker pulpit.

In 1878 the church was largely rebuilt to designs by the architects H.J. Tollit and Edwin Dolby. They re-used the Norman north doorway, 13th-century south doorway, 14th-century piscina, sedilia and chancel arch responds and a low-side window in the chancel. There had been a wooden west tower but Tollit and Dolby replaced this with a stone bellcote. They also added a vestry on the north side of the church. The church is now part of the Benefice of Chinnor, Sydenham, Aston Rowant & Crowell. The Old Rectory is a Georgian house of three bays designed by John Rebecca and built in 1822.

== Economic and social history ==
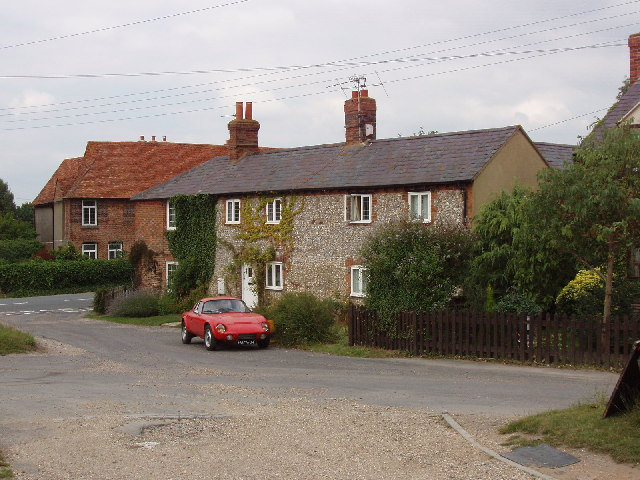
Flint cottages in Crowell

The parish originally farmed under an open field system. There had been several enclosures by agreement by the middle of the 17th century, including most of the land on Crowell Hill. The Reverend John Stopes, Rector of Crowell (d. 1668), bequeathed 4 acres of land whose income would be used to assist the poor of the parish. By the 1880s 64 per cent of Crowell's land had been enclosed: 638 acres (258 ha). In 1844 Crowell's remaining open fields were called Great Lob, Little Lob, Great Berrylands and Little Berrylands. Crowell's inclosure act was not passed until the 1880s and the award was made in 1882, making it the last inclosure act for Oxfordshire. This may be because so little land remained to be enclosed: a total of only 358 acres (145 ha) of arable land and meadow.

Ellwood House is a mid-16th-century timber-framed farmhouse with a 17th-century extension and facade and some 18th-century features. Thomas Ellwood (1639–1713), who became a Quaker religious writer and a friend of John Milton, was born here. Crowell had a public house by 1753 and a map of 1797 shows one on the same site as the current village pub. In 1859 a fire destroyed several houses in the village and made eight families homeless. The most recent pub, originally called the Catherine Wheel, seems to have been built shortly after this fire.

In 1869–72 the Watlington and Princes Risborough Railway was built through the parish, passing 600 yards (550 m) southeast of the village. In 1883 the Great Western Railway took over the line and in 1906 the company opened Kingston Crossing Halt, 1 mile (1.6 km) south of Crowell. In 1957 British Railways withdrew passenger services from the line and closed the section between Chinnor and Watlington that included Kingston.

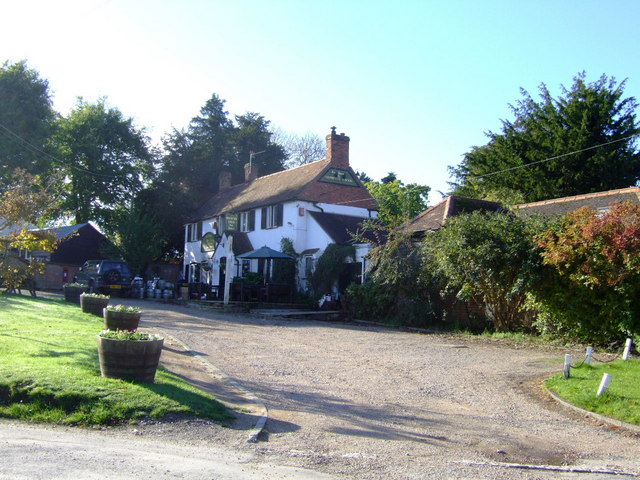
The Shepherd's Crook pub, formerly the Catherine Wheel

== Amenities ==
Crowell had a public house. It was called The Catherine Wheel until the 1990s, when it was renamed the Shepherds Crook and remained open until 2020.

== Demography ==
The 2011 census incorporated its figures into an output area accordingly used to enlarge the civil parish definition of Chinnor to the northwest due to Crowell's small population.

== Sources ==
- Gray, Howard L (1959) [1915]. The English Field Systems. Cambridge, MA; London: Harvard University Press; Merlin Press. pp. 113, 538.
- Lobel, Mary D, ed. (1964). A History of the County of Oxford. Victoria County History. Vol. 8: Lewknor and Pyrton Hundreds. London: Oxford University Press for the Institute of Historical Research. pp. 80–91.
- Sherwood, Jennifer; Pevsner, Nikolaus (1974). Oxfordshire. The Buildings of England. Harmondsworth: Penguin Books. pp. 560–561. ISBN 0-14-071045-0.
