= Chinnor =

Village in South Oxfordshire, England

Coordinates: 51.702°N 0.911°W

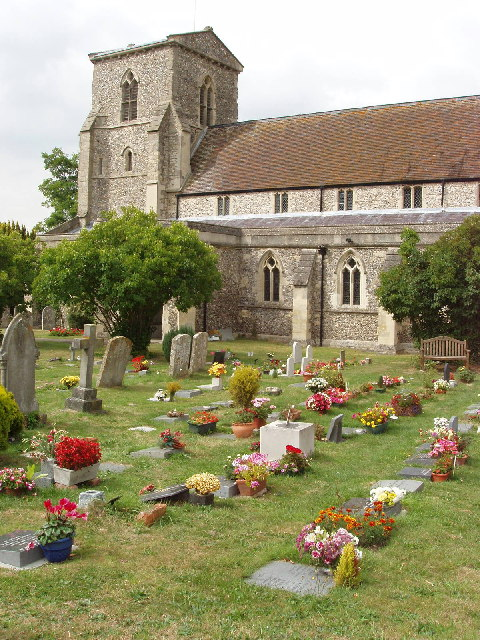
- St Andrew's parish church

- Location within Oxfordshire
- Area: 13.83 km^{2} (5.34 sq mi)
- Population: 5,924 (including Emmington, Henton & Oakley as well as 'very small' civil parish of Crowell) (2011 Census)
  - Density: 428/km^{2} (1,110/sq mi)
- OS grid reference: SP7500
- Civil parish: Chinnor
- District: South Oxfordshire
- Shire county: Oxfordshire
- Region: South East
- Country: England
- Sovereign state: United Kingdom
- Post town: Chinnor
- Postcode district: OX39
- Dialling code: 01844
- Police: Thames Valley
- Fire: Oxfordshire
- Ambulance: South Central
- UK Parliament: Henley and Thame
- Website: Chinnor Parish Council

Chinnor is a large village and civil parish in South Oxfordshire, England, about 4 miles (6 km) southeast of Thame and close to the border with Buckinghamshire. The village is a spring line settlement on the Icknield Way below the Chiltern escarpment. Since 1932 the civil parish has included the village of Emmington. The 2011 Census recorded the parish's population as 5,924.

== Pre-history ==
The Icknield Way is a pre-Roman road. The site of an Iron Age settlement from perhaps the 4th century BC has been excavated on the Chiltern ridge in the southern part of the parish. Traces of Romano-British occupation have been found both on the same high ground and below on Icknield Way. A twin barrow on Icknield Way has been found to contain the weapons of a Saxon warrior that have been dated to the 6th century. Chinnor's toponym may originally have meant the ora ("slope") of a man called Ceona.

== Manor ==
There are records of Chinnor existing in the reign of King Edward the Confessor, when the manor was held by a Saxon royal servant called Lewin. The Domesday Book of 1086 records Lewin as still holding Chinnor, but soon afterwards it was in the hands of a member of the Norman de Vernon family. However, in 1194 Walter de Vernon refused to help Prince John in France and all his lands were confiscated.

In 1203 Chinnor and the neighbouring manor of Sydenham were granted to Saer de Quincy, who in 1207 was created 1st Earl of Winchester. However, in 1215 the Earl took part in the baronial revolt against King John and his lands were confiscated. In 1216 all of the Earl's lands were supposed to have been restored to him, but Chinnor was granted to Walter de Vernon's grandson Hugh de la Mere in exchange for two palfrey horses and a term of service at Wallingford Castle. However, after the first Earl died in 1219 his son Roger de Quincy, 2nd Earl of Winchester successfully sued for possession of Chinnor and Sydenham.

The second Earl died in 1265 without a male heir. After the death of his widow, Eleanor de Ferrers, the manor of Chinnor was divided between the Earl's three daughters Ellen, Lady Zouche; Elizabeth, Countess of Buchan; and Margaret, Countess of Derby. By 1279 Elizabeth's one-third of the manor had been transferred to Margaret. This made the de Ferrers family feudal overlords of two-thirds of Chinnor, which they retained until after 1517 when Walter Devereux, 10th Baron Ferrers of Chartley sold Chinnor to an Alderman of the City of London, Sir Stephen Jennings.

Jennings immediately re-sold Chinnor to Richard Fermor of Easton Neston, Northamptonshire. In 1607 Fermor's grandson Sir George Fermor and great-grandson Sir Hatton Fermor sold Chinnor to Sir John Dormer, MP for Aylesbury. In 1667, Sir John's grandson Robert Dormer, also MP for Aylesbury, bought the Zouche manor that had been separate since the 13th century (see above).

In 1739 Robert's grandson Lt. Gen. James Dormer, a member of the Kit-Cat Club, sold Chinnor to a William Huggins. In 1761 Huggins left Chinnor to his daughter Jane and son-in-law Rev. James Musgrave, grandson of Sir Richard Musgrave, 2nd Baronet, of Hayton Castle. Chinnor remained in the family of the Musgrave baronets until the death of Sir William Augustus Musgrave, 10th Baronet, in 1875, when it passed to his brother-in-law Aubrey Wenman Wykeham, who took the name Wykeham-Musgrave. By then very little of the original lands remained with the manor. His son Wenman Aubrey Wykeham-Musgrave inherited both Chinnor and Thame Park, but in 1917 the estates were broken up and sold.

== Churches ==
=== Church of England ===
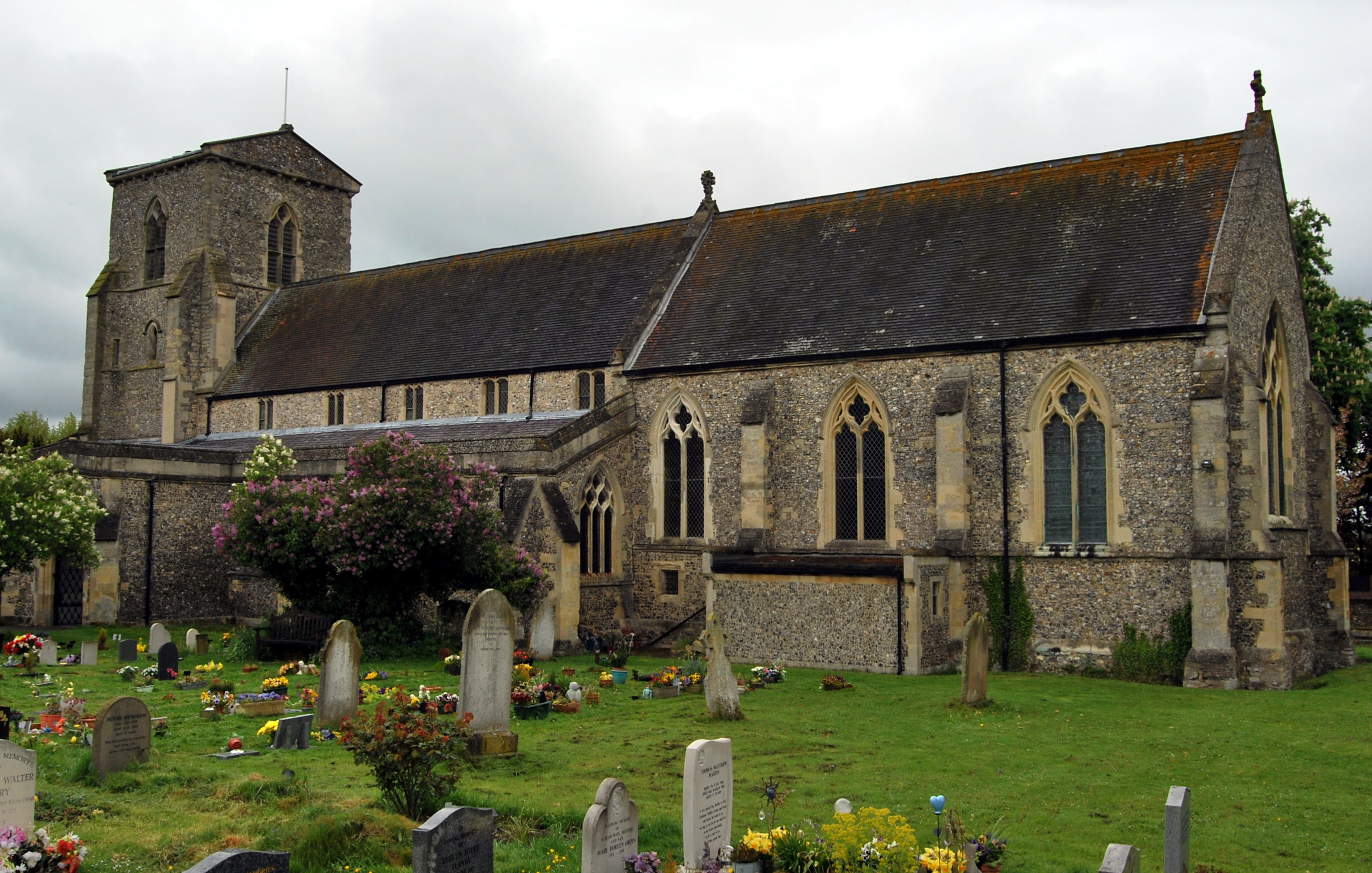
St Andrew's parish church

The earliest record of the Church of England parish church of Saint Andrew is from 1160. The nave was rebuilt in the 13th century, when the present arcades of four and a half bays for first the north aisles and then the south aisle were built. Building of the present tower began towards the end of the 13th century. Early in the 14th century St Andrew's was remodelled. The chancel was entirely rebuilt, the tower was made higher and the porch was built. The aisles were widened, given new windows, and extended westwards to flank either side of the tower. A rood screen was installed between the chancel and nave. The chancel and high altar were dedicated in 1326, which may therefore have been the year that the remodelling was completed. The high-pitched 13th century nave roof was replaced, probably later in the 14th century, with a Perpendicular Gothic clerestory and low-pitched roof.

The architect Richard Pace designed St Andrew's Rectory, which was built in 1813. St Andrew's was restored in 1863–66. The plans were by the architect Edward Banks of Wolverhampton but were modified by the Oxford Diocesan architect G.E. Street and the Oxford architectural writer and publisher J.H. Parker. The nave roof was restored to a high pitch and the chancel was raised above the nave. Clayton and Bell restored the medieval stained glass and added a new east window. The 14th century font was replaced with a new one of Caen stone. The 14th century rood screen was reduced in height. The chancel, nave and aisles were entirely refurnished. However, in 1930 the original font was retrieved and reinstalled.

In the south aisle is a carved recumbent effigy of a knight of about 1270 or 1300. St Andrew's has also one of the largest collections of monumental brasses in the country. Most are 14th or 15th century but there are also later brasses commemorating a churchwarden (died 1899) and his wife, and two soldiers killed in the First World War.

By 1558 St Andrew's had a ring of four bells and a Sanctus bell. In the succeeding century all were replaced and the ring was increased to five. William Knight II of Reading cast the oldest bell in about 1586. Further bells were cast by Henry Knight I in 1620, Ellis Knight I in 1635, and Henry Knight II in 1663. A tenor bell was cast in 1651, but in 1864 it was recast as two smaller bells increasing the ring to six. In 1965 John Taylor & Co of Loughborough cast a new Sanctus bell and in 1969 the same company cast a new treble and second bell to replace the two 1864 bells. St Andrew's parish is now part of the Benefice of Chinnor, Sydenham, Aston Rowant and Crowell.

=== Anabaptist ===
In the 18th century Chinnor had a small number of Anabaptists. In 1732 a private house in Chinnor was licensed for Anabaptist worship, and in 1759 and 1768 six people from Chinnor worshipped at an Anabaptist meeting house in Princes Risborough.

=== Congregational ===
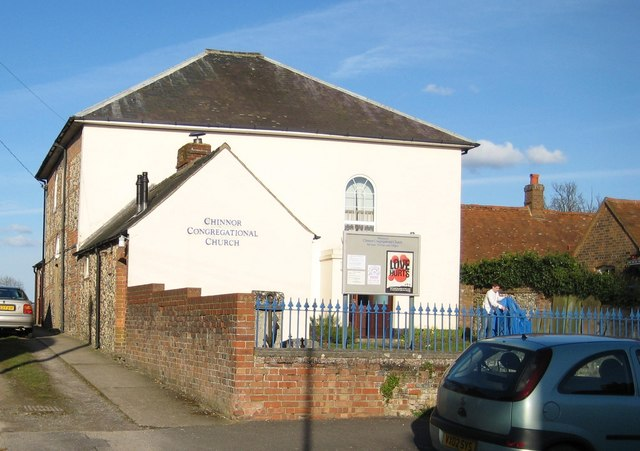
Chinnor Congregational Church

The Congregationalist John Cennick (1718–55) preached in Chinnor but Chinnor Congregational Church was not built until 1805. It was enlarged in 1811 but suffered a schism in 1826, when a rival second chapel was built. The schism had been healed by 1839, by which time the second chapel had been converted into the minister's manse. By 1841 the minister had opened a British School. A schoolroom was added to the chapel in 1884 and the chapel was restored in 1888. In 1893 funds were raised to add an infants' classroom to the school but by the end of the year the school had closed. The church survives as Chinnor Community Church.

=== Methodist ===
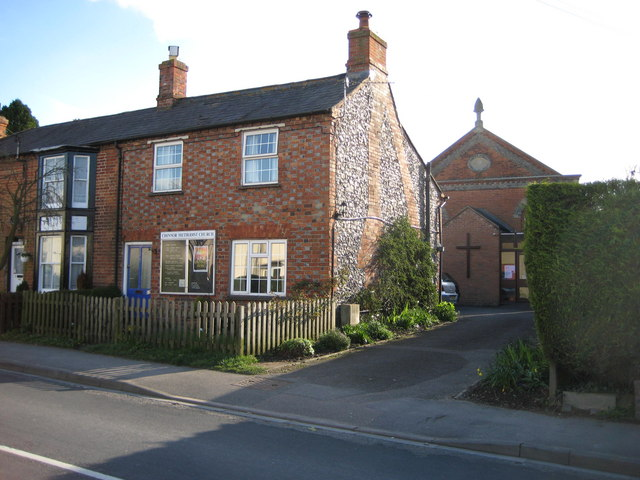
Methodist church behind a cottage in Station Road

The Methodist George Whitefield (1714–70) preached in Chinnor and in 1753 two private houses were licensed for Methodist worship. In 1759 Chinnor's Church of England rector reported that a third of the parish was Methodist. By 1768 the Methodists had opened a small school in Chinnor. In 1778 he reported that they were increasing but by 1784 the reported proportion had fallen to a quarter of the population. By 1854 Chinnor had a Primitive Methodist chapel. It was replaced by a new chapel built in 1873 which is now Chinnor Methodist Church.

== Social and economic history ==
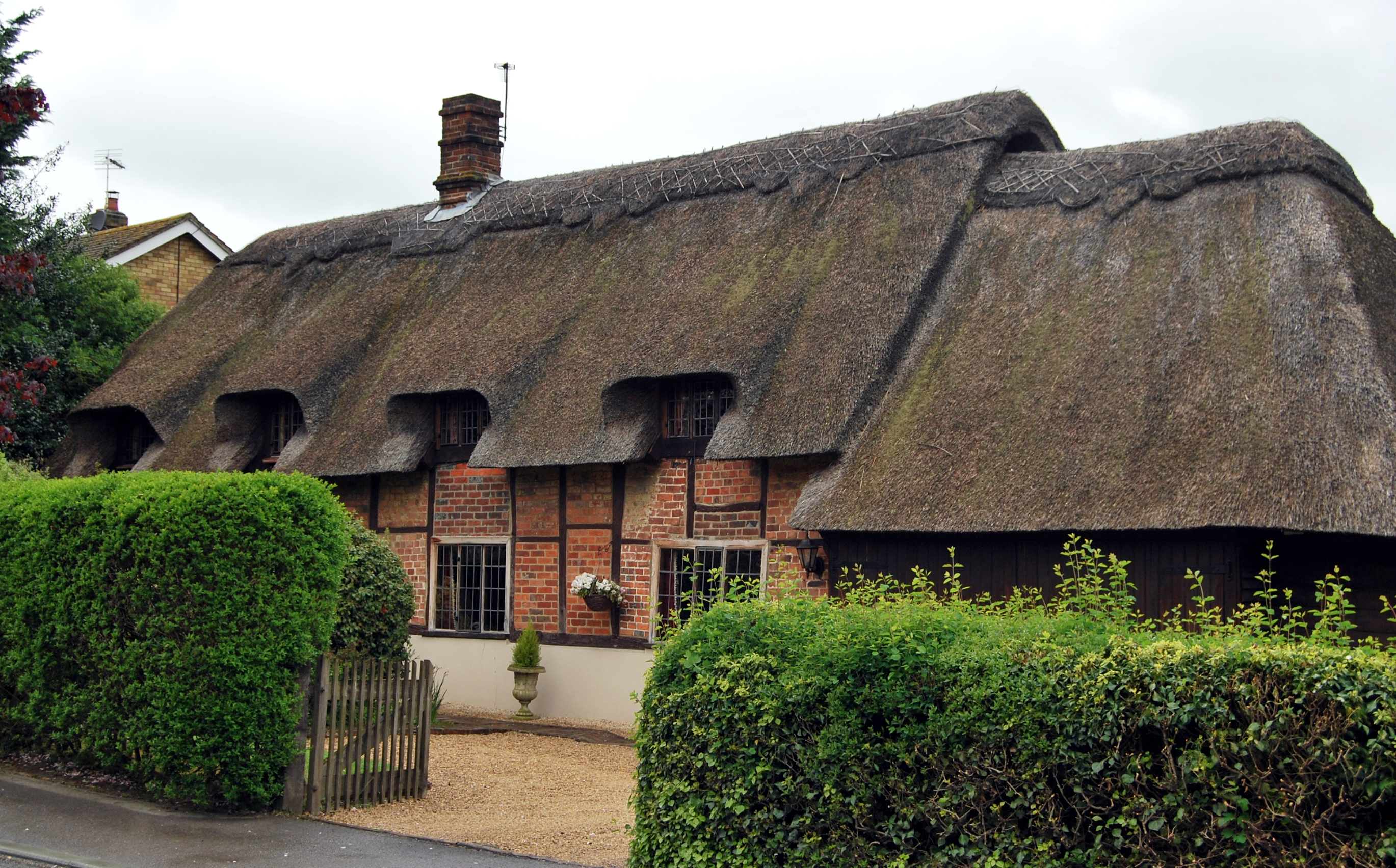
Thatched cottage in Chinnor

By the early part of the 13th century there was a windmill on the Chiltern escarpment at Wainhill, about 1 mile (1.6 km) east of Chinnor village. Chinnor had a watermill, but by 1279 it had been transferred to the neighbouring manor of Henton. In 1336 the Ferrers manor at Chinnor (see above) had a windmill. In 1789 a post mill was built on the west side of the village off White's Field. It was dismantled in 1965 but has since been rebuilt by Chinnor Windmill Restoration Society. It is unusual in having 3 crosstrees and 6 quarter bars.

At the end of the 16th century Sir George Fermor (see above) enclosed some of the woods in the parish. Attempts to enclose Chinnor's common lands were ruled illegal and reversed in 1761 and 1817. Parliament passed an enclosure act for Chinnor in 1847 but the enclosure award to allocate the land was not implemented until 1854.

On 18 June 1643 during the English Civil War a Royalist force of 1,800 men led by Prince Rupert arrived from Oxford, overcame the Parliamentarian garrisons at Postcombe and Chinnor and took 120 men prisoner. A pursuing Parliamentarian force intercepted them 7 miles (11 km) away near Chalgrove, but in the resulting Battle of Chalgrove Field the Royalists fought off their pursuers and returned with their prisoners to Oxford.

In the latter part of the 18th century a petition signed by the Rector and 13 tenant farmers complained that Chinnor had such a "multitude" of alehouses that they were "a check to industry and good order". The petition claimed that the Chequers was a house of ill fame and called for its licence not to be renewed. The 1851 Census recorded 268 lace-makers in Chinnor, including labourers' wives and 86 children. Chinnor still has a lace group.

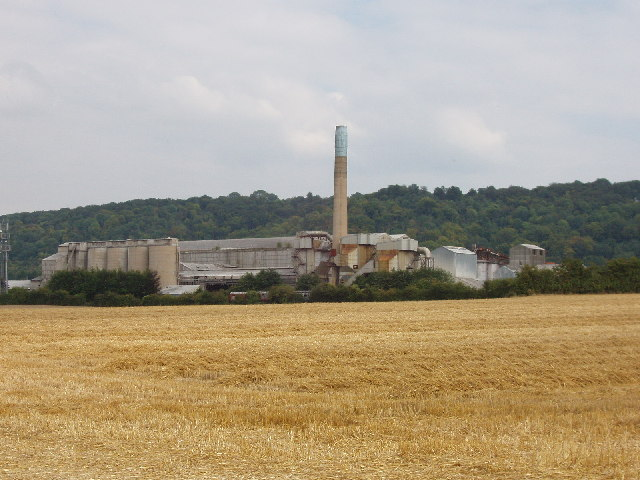
Former cement works, now demolished.

The Chinnor Lime Co. was founded in 1908 and began making cement in 1921. It became a public company as Chinnor Cement and Lime Ltd. in 1936. It established a quarry in the Chiltern escarpment south of the village. It expanded cement manufacturing capacity in 1928, 1939 and 1958. By 1975 it employed 160 men and expansion to double its capacity was proposed, although never realised. It closed in 1999. Its works were demolished by 2008 and in 2010–11 the site was redeveloped as a housing estate now known as Old Kiln Lakes.

Chinnor grew most quickly in the 1960s – from a population of 1,961 in the 1951 Census to 4,471 in the 1971 Census. The village was then largely concentrated around the main rectangular street plan of Station Road, Lower Road, High Street and Church Road. The hamlet of Oakley to the southwest was subsumed into the village around this time, when building along Oakley Road and the Mill Lane estate more than doubled the physical size of the village.

=== Schools ===
By 1803 Chinnor had a school of industry that taught lace-making and sewing. In 1815 there were three schools teaching girls to make lace, which became an important local industry (see above). There were four schools for boys but there was no Church of England school until the 1850s.

In 1848 Magdalen College, Oxford voted to fund a Church of England school. St Andrew's Church of England Primary School was designed by G.E. Street and building began in 1857. Magdalen College provided further funds in 1859 and the landlord of the Crown Inn also gave funds. The school at last opened in 1860. In 1892 it was enlarged, again at Magdalen College's expense. It became a voluntary controlled school in 1948 and taught children of all ages until a secondary modern school was opened at Thame in 1959. The closure of schools at Sydenham (1948) and Kingston Blount (1956) expanded the school again - these pupils were bussed in, as were pupils from Henton and Emmington. The primary school moved to a two-building site with outdoor swimming pool - now Chinnor Community Pool - in Station Road, built in 1967-68 and formally completed in 1970, when the old school building at the junction of Oakley Road and Station Road was closed and later converted to housing. The site underwent significant renovation and expansion in 1979-80. Chinnor now also has a community primary school, Mill Lane Community Primary School, which was built in 1974. St Andrew's and Mill Lane Community Primary School are feeder schools to Lord Williams's School in Thame or Icknield Community College in Watlington.

=== Transport ===
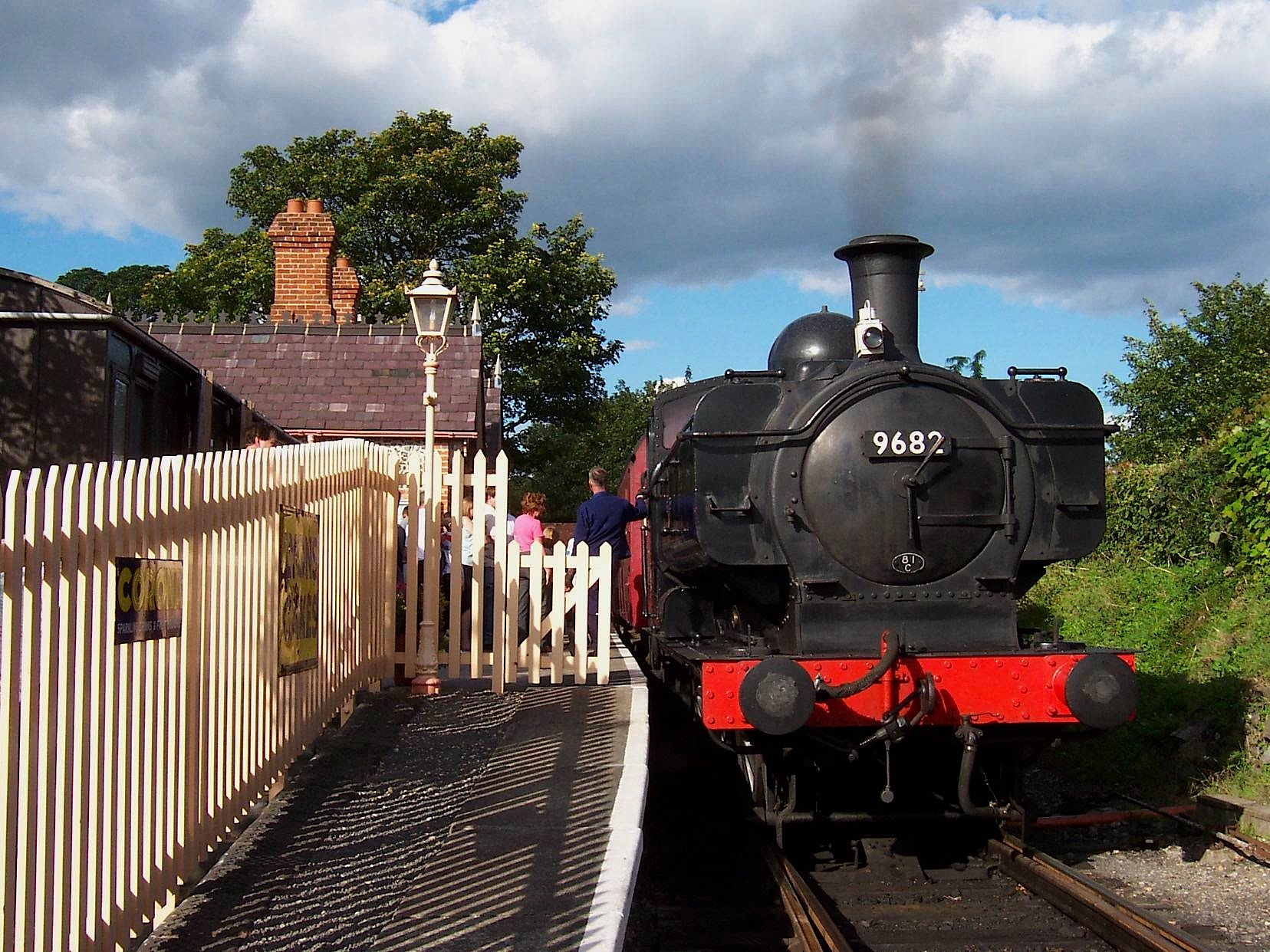
Preserved GWR steam locomotive on a train at Chinnor railway station

The Watlington and Princes Risborough Railway between Princes Risborough and Watlington was built through the parish and opened in 1872. Chinnor railway station was opened to serve the village. The railway was independent until the Great Western Railway took it over in 1883. Sidings to serve Chinnor cement works were added in 1927. British Railways closed the railway through Chinnor to passengers in 1957 and to goods in 1961. The section between Princes Risborough and Chinnor remained open to serve Chinnor cement works until 1989. Since 1994 Chinnor railway station has been the terminus of the Chinnor and Princes Risborough Railway, a heritage railway which operates steam and diesel trains on some weekends and bank holidays. Chinnor has bus links with Thame and High Wycombe by the No. 40, Princes Risborough railway station and town centre by the No. 320, High Wycombe and Oxford by the No. 275.

== Notable people ==
- Musician Adam Clayton, bassist of the rock band U2, was born in Chinnor in 1960.
- Former BBC Television weather presenter Bill Giles lives in the village.
- Competitive swimmer and Commonwealth Games gold medallist Simon Burnett lived in Chinnor as a child.
- Composer and pianist Freda Swain (1902–1985) lived with her husband, the pianist Arthur Alexander (1891–1969), in a bungalow on Chinnor Hill.
- Philanthropist and founder of the charity Fight Bladder Cancer, Andrew Winterbottom, lived in the village.

== Amenities ==
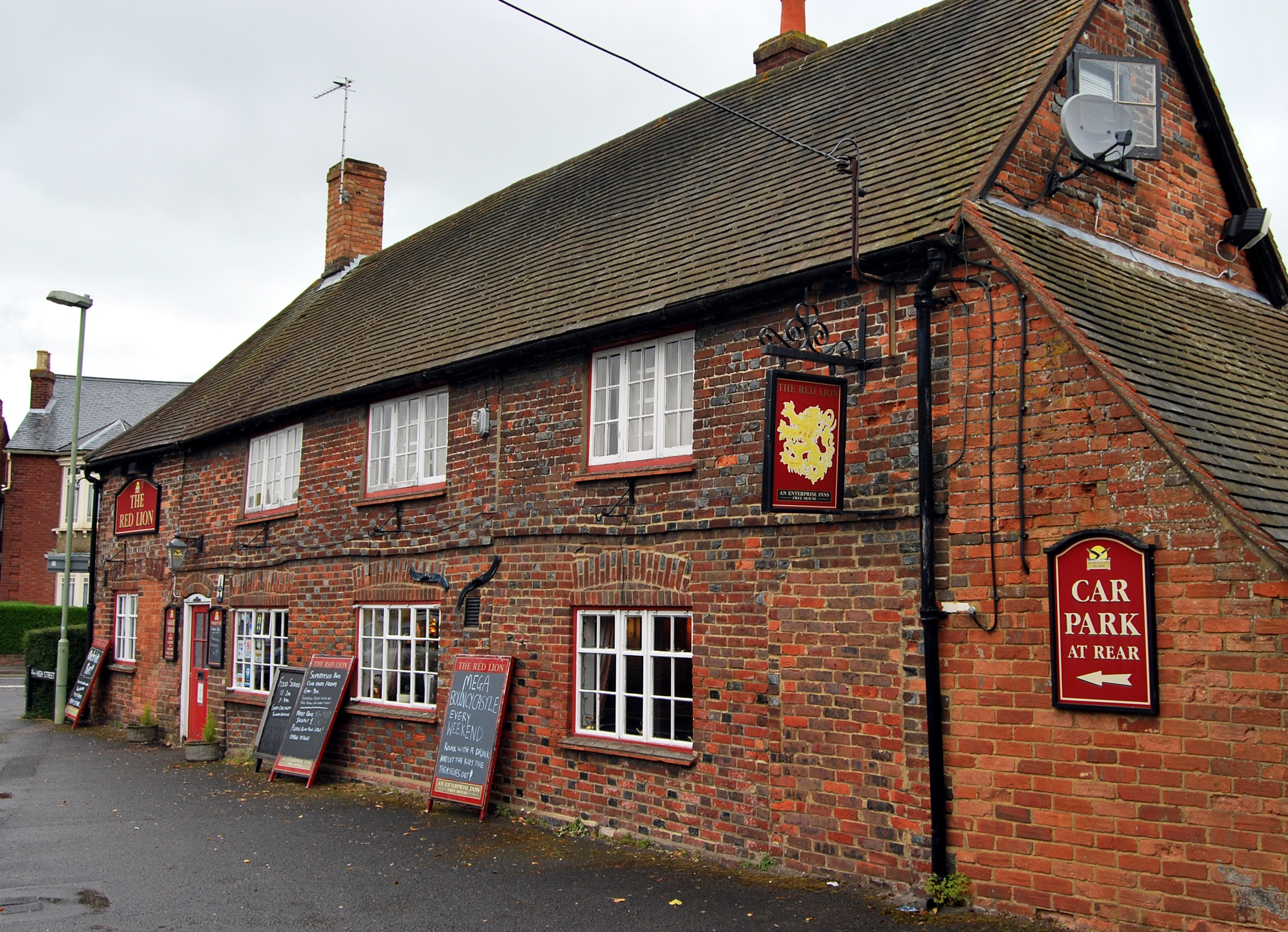
Red Lion public house

Chinnor village currently has three public houses: The Crown, The Red Lion and The Wheatsheaf. Former pubs include the Bird in Hand (closed 2000), the Royal Oak (closed 2011), the Kings Head (closed 2012) and the Black Boy (closed 2013). About 1 1/2 miles (2.4 km) south of the village at Spriggs Alley in the Chilterns is the Sir Charles Napier Inn gastropub. Chinnor has a public library, a village hall and a Women's Institute.

== Sport ==
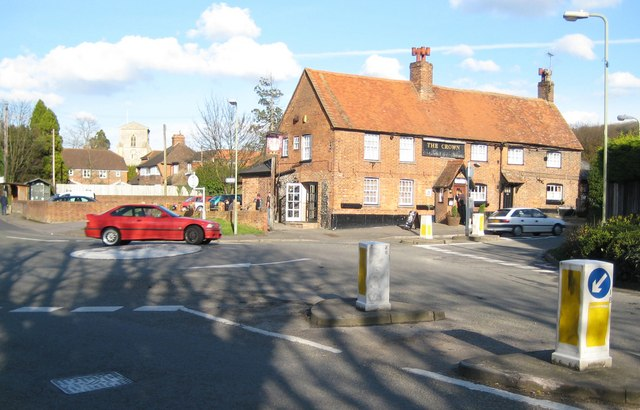
Crown public house

Chinnor has several sports clubs. The rugby union club, Chinnor R.F.C., is based in Thame and is currently in the RFU Championship, the second tier of the English rugby union structure. Chinnor F.C. is a non-League football club that plays in Hellenic Football League Division One East and plays its home games at Station Road Playing Fields. The village has a cricket club, which plays in the Cherwell Cricket League.

=== Leisure ===
Chinnor has a Silver Band, that was founded in about 1850. Chinnor Beer Festival is held annually on August bank holiday at Whites Field off Mill Lane. It raises money for the youth of Chinnor.

== Demography ==
The 2011 Census incorporated the figures for the nearby hamlet of Crowell to the south into an output area accordingly used to enlarge the civil parish definition of Chinnor due to Crowell's small population.

== Sources ==
- Colvin, HM (1997). A Biographical Dictionary of British Architects, 1600–1840. New Haven: Yale University Press. p. 764. ISBN 0-300-07207-4.
- Lobel, Mary D, ed. (1964). A History of the County of Oxford. Victoria County History. Vol. 8: Lewknor and Pyrton Hundreds. London: Oxford University Press for the Institute of Historical Research. pp. 55–80.
- Oppitz, Leslie (2000). Lost Railways of the Chilterns. Newbury: Countryside Books. pp. 20–23. ISBN 1-85306-643-5.
- Sherwood, Jennifer; Pevsner, Nikolaus (1974). Oxfordshire. The Buildings of England. Harmondsworth: Penguin Books. pp. 534–536. ISBN 0-14-071045-0.
