= Lewknor Bridge Halt railway station =

Oxfordshire railway station

Coordinates: 51.6703°N 0.9665°W

Lewknor Bridge Halt
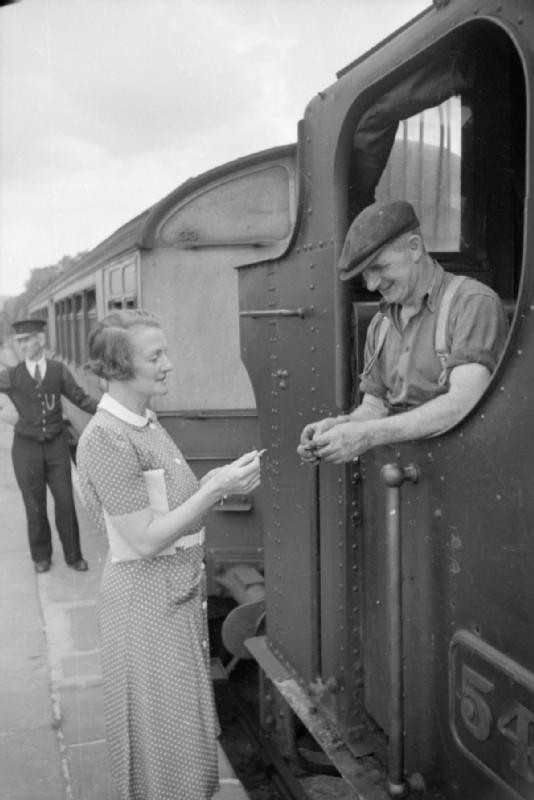
- A Village Saves to National Savings in Lewknor, Oxfordshire, England, 1941

General information
- Location: Lewknor, South Oxfordshire; England
- Grid reference: SU715973
- Platforms: 1

Other information
- Status: Disused

History
- Original company: Great Western Railway
- Pre-grouping: Great Western Railway
- Post-grouping: Great Western Railway; Western Region of British Railways

Key dates
- 1 September 1906: Station opened
- 1 July 1957: Closed
Location

Lewknor Bridge Halt railway station was a halt on the Watlington and Princes Risborough Railway which the Great Western Railway opened in 1906 to serve the Oxfordshire village of Lewknor. The opening of the halt was part of a GWR attempt to encourage more passengers on the line at a time when competition from bus services was drawing away patronage.

== History ==
The halt was one of three that the GWR opened on the line in September 1906 to try to encourage passenger traffic in the face of increased competition from buses. It was southeast of Lewknor, on the western side of a bridge carrying the Watlington and Princes Risborough Railway over a lane known as "Shiftcutts".

The bridge (no. 6m 74c), which had 19 inches (480 mm) wrought iron girders, spanned 20 feet (6.1 m) and was supported by brick and flint abutments; it had a minimum headroom of 15 feet 8 inches (4.78 m). A single platform was provided on which stood a wooden passenger waiting shelter and the running in board. The halt was unstaffed and in winter two hurricane lamps lit the platform at night, both being lit and extinguished by the late-turn guard. Access to the station was via a kissing gate and a flight of steps from the roadside on the south side of the bridge.

In the longer term the GWR's halt strategy did little to dissuade people from more convenient bus services. In 1957 British Railways closed the halt and withdrew passenger services from the line.

| Preceding station | Disused railways | Following station |
|---|---|---|
| Aston Rowant; Line and station closed | Great Western Railway; Watlington and Princes Risborough Railway | Watlington; Line and station closed |

== Present day ==
Shiftcutts (now known as Hill Road) was truncated by the building of the B4009 Watlington road which bypasses Lewknor village, cutting across the former railway alignment and obliterating the site of Lewknor Bridge Halt. Although the bridge no longer exists, the steps leading up to the halt are reported to be still extant.

== Sources ==
- Butt, R. V. J. (October 1995). The Directory of Railway Stations: details every public and private passenger station, halt, platform and stopping place, past and present (1st ed.). Sparkford: Patrick Stephens Ltd. ISBN 978-1-85260-508-7. OCLC 60251199. OL 11956311M.
- Clinker, CR (1978). Clinker's Register of Closed Passenger Stations and Goods Depots in England, Scotland and Wales 1830–1977. Bristol: Avon-Anglia Publications & Services. ISBN 0-905466-19-5.
- Jowett, Alan (2000). Jowett's Nationalised Railway Atlas (1st ed.). Penryn, Cornwall: Atlantic Transport Publishers. ISBN 978-0-906899-99-1. OCLC 228266687.
- Jowett, Alan (March 1989). Jowett's Railway Atlas of Great Britain and Ireland: From Pre-Grouping to the Present Day (1st ed.). Sparkford: Patrick Stephens Ltd. ISBN 978-1-85260-086-0. OCLC 22311137.
- Karau, Paul; Turner, Chris (1998). Country branch line: An intimate portrait of the Watlington branch. Vol. 2: The stations. Didcot: Wild Swan. ISBN 1-874103-46-1.
- Oppitz, Leslie (2000). Lost Railways of the Chilterns. Newbury: Countryside Books. pp. 20–23. ISBN 1-85306-643-5.
