= Oakley, Oxfordshire =

Village in Oxfordshire, England

Coordinates: 51.699°N 00.919°W

Oakley
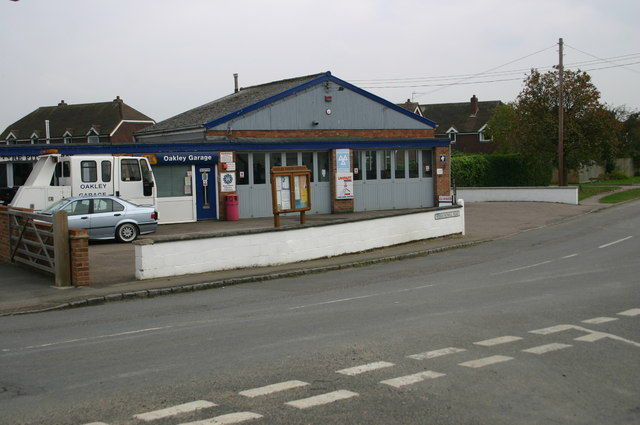
- Oakley Garage

- Location within Oxfordshire
- OS grid reference: SP7400
- Civil parish: Chinnor
- District: South Oxfordshire
- Shire county: Oxfordshire
- Region: South East
- Country: England
- Sovereign state: United Kingdom
- Post town: Chinnor
- Postcode district: OX39
- Dialling code: 01844
- Police: Thames Valley
- Fire: Oxfordshire
- Ambulance: South Central
- UK Parliament: Henley

Oakley is a spring line settlement at the foot of the Chiltern Hills on the route of the Lower Icknield Way. It is about 4.5 miles (7.2 km) southeast of Thame in Oxfordshire, England. It is in the civil parish of Chinnor, and 20th century housing developments have absorbed Oakley into that village.
