= Sir Charles Napier Inn =

Coordinates: 51°40′44″N 0°53′48″W

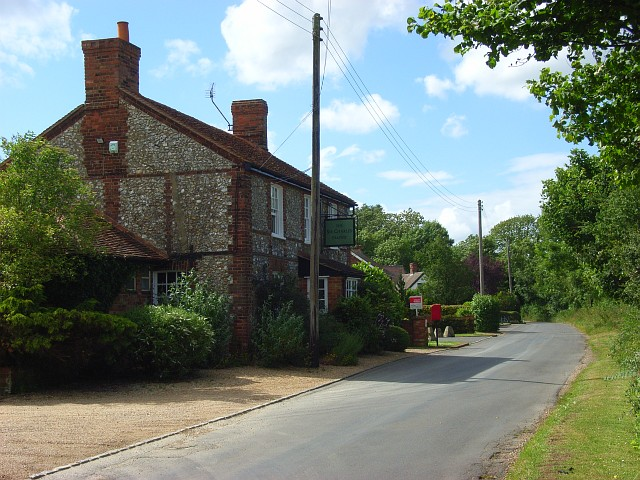
- Interactive map of Sir Charles Napier Inn

Restaurant information
- Food type: Gastropub
- Location: Oxfordshire, United Kingdom
- Website: sircharlesnapier.co.uk

The Sir Charles Napier Inn (commonly known as the Sir Charles Napier or simply the Charles Napier) is a gastropub in Spriggs Alley about 1.5 miles (2.4 km) south of Chinnor, Oxfordshire, England. It was built in the early 19th century and is named (along with several other English pubs) after General Sir Charles James Napier (1782-1853).

As of 2002 its proprietor for 35 years had been Julie Griffiths.

== History ==
Kaye Griffiths' family had been farmers in Chinnor for two generations. His father bought the pub, which abuts the family's land, in the 1960s for £4,000, and put Kaye's wife, Julie, whose parents had been in the hotel trade, in charge.

Initially the cook was Kaye, although he was later replaced with a chef named Batiste from Sardinia, who remained chef for 19 years. In the middle 1990s Kaye became estranged from Julie, and in 1996 he renovated and moved into a cowshed near to the Inn with his son, transferring his interest in the business to his wife. In 2002 Kaye was fined for the renovation and ordered to demolish the cowshed.

For 10 years the restaurant was run by Stan Parkes, who was then replaced in 1987 by Caroline, Julie's daughter.
