= Cowleaze Wood =

Woodland in the Chiltern Hills of South East England

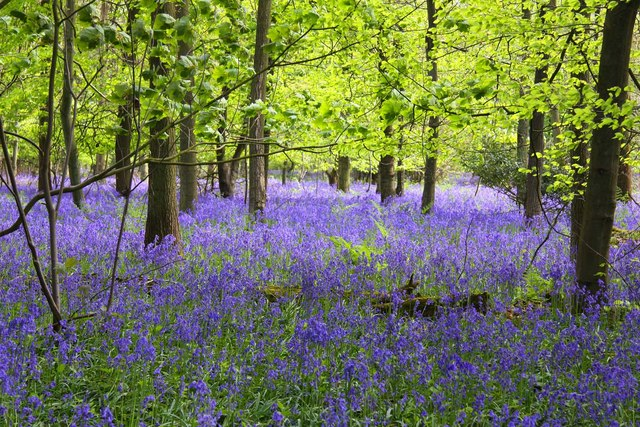
- Bluebells in Cowleaze Wood

- Location within Oxfordshire
- Interactive map of Cowleaze Wood

Geography
- Location: Oxfordshire, England
- OS grid: SU726957
- Coordinates: 51.655°N 0.945°W
- Area: 70-acre (28 ha)

Administration
- Authority: Forestry Commission

Cowleaze Wood is a 70-acre (28 ha) woodland in the Chiltern Hills, a chalk ridge in South East England. The wood is in the civil parish of Lewknor, in Oxfordshire, about 1 1/4 miles (2 km) southeast of the village. It is next to the county boundary with Buckinghamshire, and adjoins Lydall's Wood on the Buckinghamshire side of the boundary.

The Forestry Commission owns Coweleaze Wood, and planted it between 1957 and 1966. It is particularly known for its bluebells, and walkers are also attracted to the wood by sightings of red kites. There is a large car park adjoining the wood, and a picnic area with sculptured benches designed by furniture designer Fred Baier.

== Air crash ==
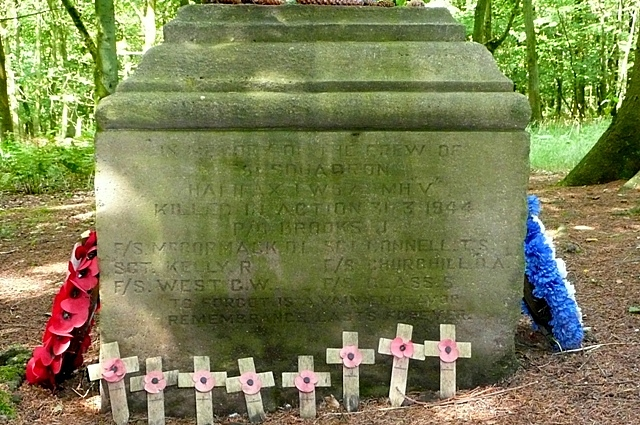
Monument in Cowleaze Wood to the crew of RAF Halifax LW579

On 31 March 1944 a Handley Page Halifax Mk III bomber aircraft, LW579 of No. 51 Squadron RAF, was returning from the Nuremberg Raid when it crashed in the wood, killing all seven of its crew.

LW579 was based at RAF Snaith in the East Riding of Yorkshire and seems to have been at least 120 miles (190 km) off course. It was a clear, moonlit night, and it is not clear why the Halifax lost height and crashed into the hill. It was one of six aircraft that the squadron lost in the same night on the same mission.

There is a monument in the wood to the crew of LW579. It is a stone plinth from Lincoln Cathedral, now with the men's names inscribed upon it. In 2015 BBC Radio Oxford broadcast a documentary about the crash, the crew and some of their surviving relatives.

== Sculpture trail ==
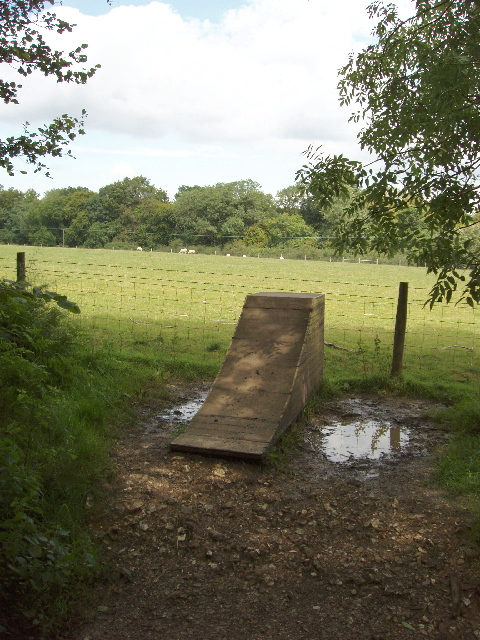
"Platform for Self Elevation", one of the sculptures formerly in the Wood

For 17 years the Chiltern Sculpture Trail was in Cowleaze Wood. The trail was created in May 1990, as a joint initiative between the Chiltern Sculpture Trust and the Forestry Commission, who had been placing sculpture in woodlands under their management since the 1970s. The 2-mile trail featured the work of a range of artists working with different media, with pieces being commissioned and produced specifically for the woodland setting. Many of the pieces were hidden and blended with the landscape. Richard Mabey, writing in the Independent on Sunday, commented: "All along the trail, serendipitously windthrown logs, dens, a polythene bag wrapped round a branch in the shape of a squirrel, make you wonder whether you are looking at a deliberate work or a natural happening." Sculptures that appeared as part of the trail included a giant picnic table by Robert Jakes and a metal "fish tree" by Paul Amey.

The sculpture trail was open to the public all year round at no charge. The chairman of the Sculpture Trust estimated in 2007 that the trail had received in the region of 80,000 visitors a year. It was closed in 2007 owing to a lack of funding; the maintenance costs were around £25,000 a year. At the point of closure, there were 20 sculptures in the wood, some of which were sold at auction.

== Bald Hill ==
Within the wood is Bald Hill, the highest point of the historic county of Oxfordshire, 843 feet (257 m) above sea level. It remained the high point of the County until 1974, when boundary changes meant that it was demoted by Whitehorse Hill which is slightly higher at 856 feet (261 m) and the current County top. The historic high point is located at SU72889577, but is unmarked and hard to find with any certainty. The location is of interest to participants in Hill bagging who visit these high points of the historic counties of England.

== See also ==
- Lyford in the Vale of White Horse, where an RAF Avro Lancaster B.I Special bomber aircraft crashed in 1945.
- Pyrton, where an RAF Vickers Wellington Mk IC bomber aircraft crashed in 1943.
