= Sydenham, Oxfordshire =

Village in Oxfordshire, England

Coordinates: 51.713°N 0.945°W

Sydenham
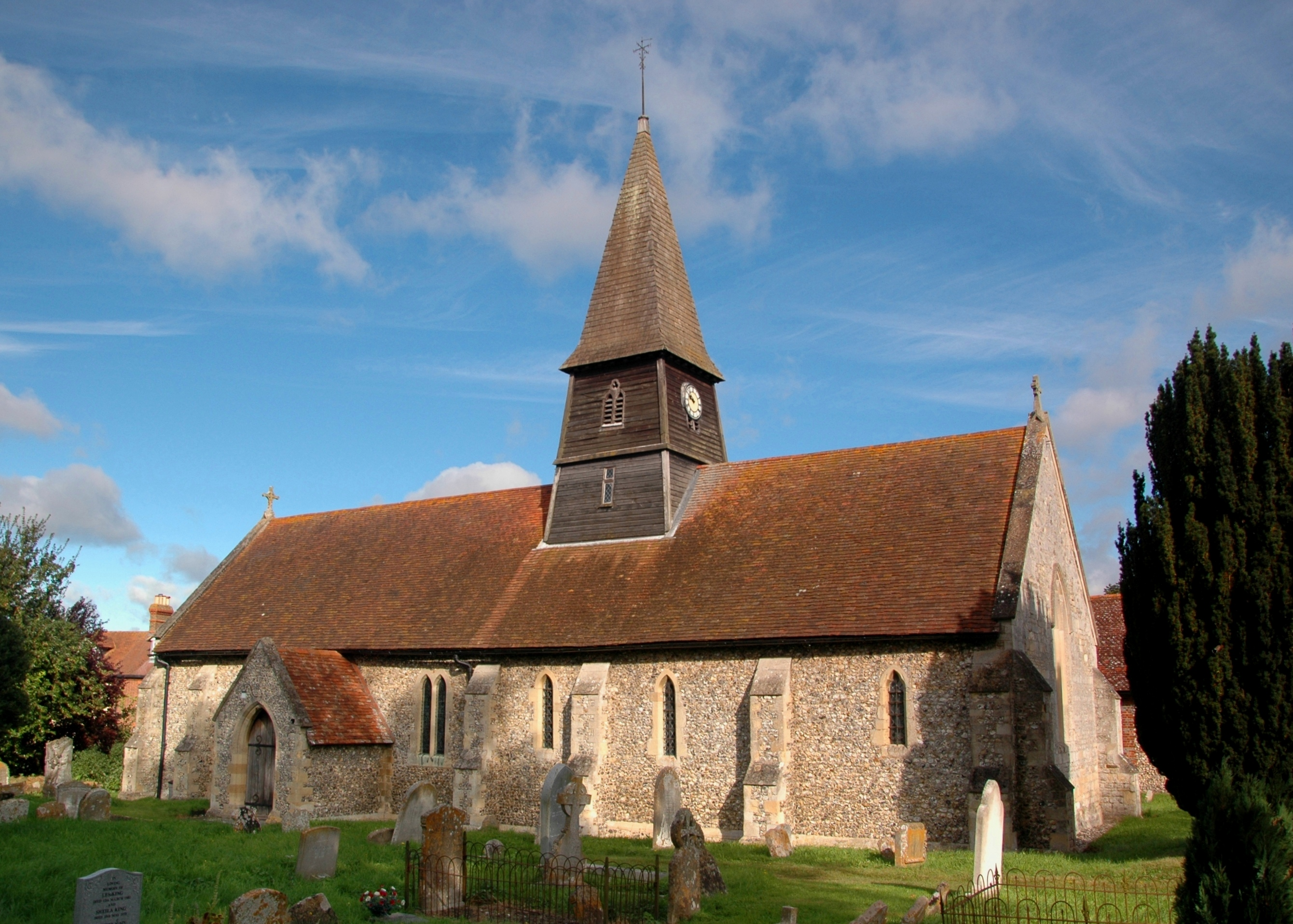
- St Mary's parish church

- Location within Oxfordshire
- Area: 10.42 km^{2} (4.02 sq mi)
- Population: 451 (2011 census)
  - Density: 43/km^{2} (110/sq mi)
- OS grid reference: SP7201
- Civil parish: Sydenham
- District: South Oxfordshire
- Shire county: Oxfordshire
- Region: South East
- Country: England
- Sovereign state: United Kingdom
- Post town: Chinnor
- Postcode district: OX39
- Dialling code: 01844
- Police: Thames Valley
- Fire: Oxfordshire
- Ambulance: South Central
- UK Parliament: Henley and Thame
- Website: Sydenham Village

Sydenham is a village and civil parish about 3 miles (5 km) southeast of Thame in Oxfordshire. To the south the parish is bounded by the ancient Lower Icknield Way, and on its other sides largely by brooks that merge as Cuttle Brook, a tributary of the River Thame. The 2011 census recorded the parish's population as 451.

== Manor ==
Sydenham was settled in the Anglo-Saxon era. Its toponym means "at the wide river-meadow". Before the Norman Conquest of England a Saxon called Almar held the manor of Sydenham. After the conquest William the Conqueror granted the manor to William FitzOsbern, 1st Earl of Hereford. In 1075 FitzOsbern's son Roger de Breteuil, 2nd Earl of Hereford was one of the leaders of the Revolt of the Earls. After the rebellion's failure William I confiscated all of Roger's lands, including Sydenham.

In the 12th century the de Vernon family who held the manor of Chinnor held also a small estate at Sydenham. Richard de Vernon granted one hide of land at Sydenham to the Cistercian Thame Abbey by 1146 and a second hide by 1155. In 1203 the manor of Sydenham was granted to Saer de Quincy, 1st Earl of Winchester. In 1248 his son Roger de Quincy, 2nd Earl of Winchester gave the manor of Sydenham to Thame Abbey. The Abbey held the manor and Sydenham Grange until the Crown forced it to surrender all its property in the dissolution of the monasteries in 1539.

In 1542 the Crown granted Sydenham to Sir John Williams, who in 1554 was made Baron Williams de Thame. In 1559 Baron Williams died without a male heir, leaving his estates to be divided between his two daughters. He left Sydenham to his daughter Margaret and her husband Henry Norris, who in 1572 was created 1st Baron Norreys. In 1608 Henry Norris' heir Francis Norris, 1st Earl of Berkshire conveyed Sydenham to Sir Richard Wenman, who in 1628 was created 1st Viscount Wenman. The Manor of Sydenham remained with the Wenmans and their heirs the Wykeham-Musgraves until early in the 20th century. Between 1917 and 1925 the family sold almost all of the manor, and the manorial rights lapsed.

There were some early enclosures of land in the parish: Thame Abbey's Sydenham Grange existed by 1474, and further enclosures had taken place by the 1550s and 1630. However, half of the land of the parish continued to be farmed under an open field system until the Thame and Sydenham Inclosure Act 1823 (4 Geo. 4. c. 8 Pr.) was passed, leading to an enclosure award in 1826.

== Church and chapels ==
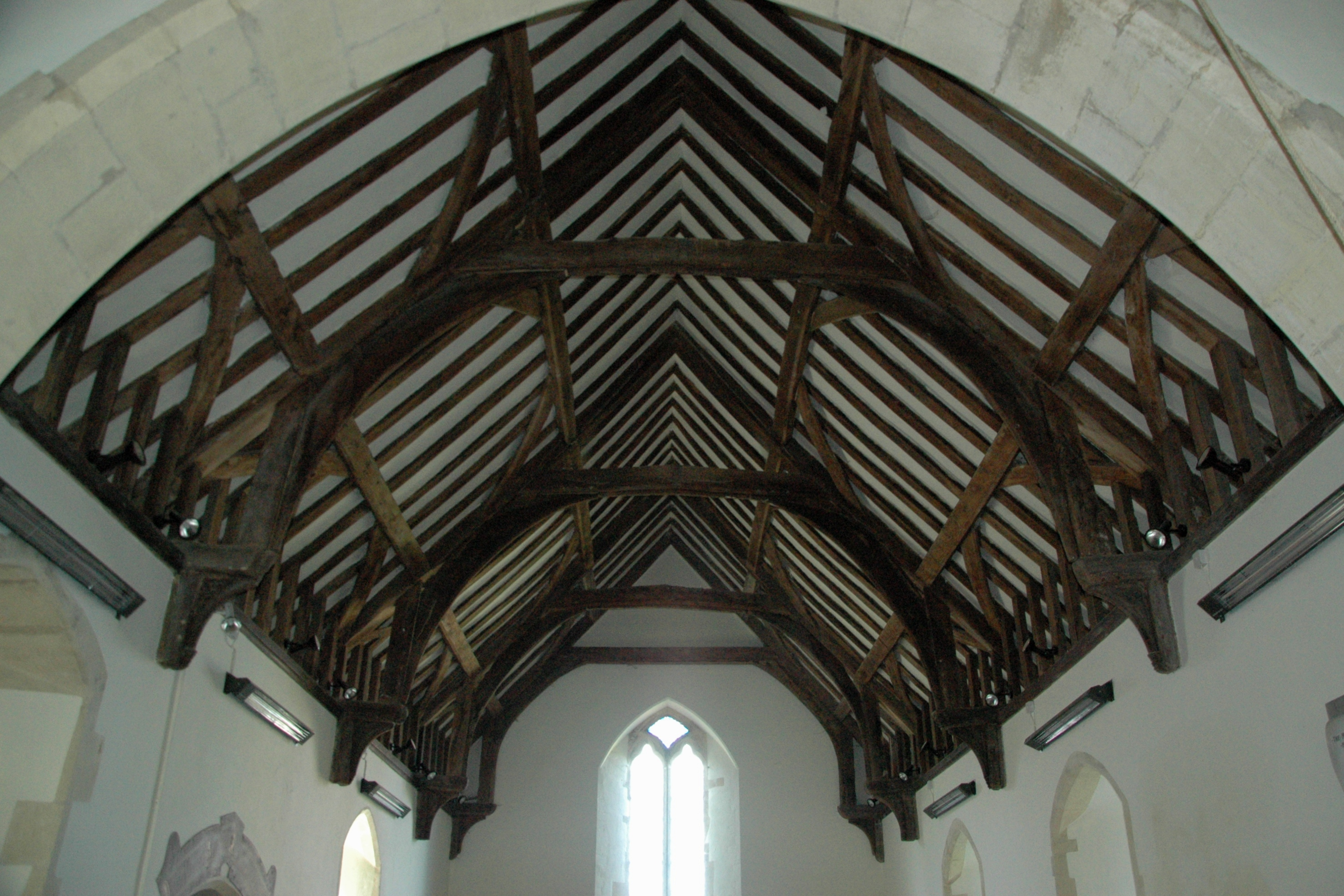
The nave's 15th-century hammerbeam roof

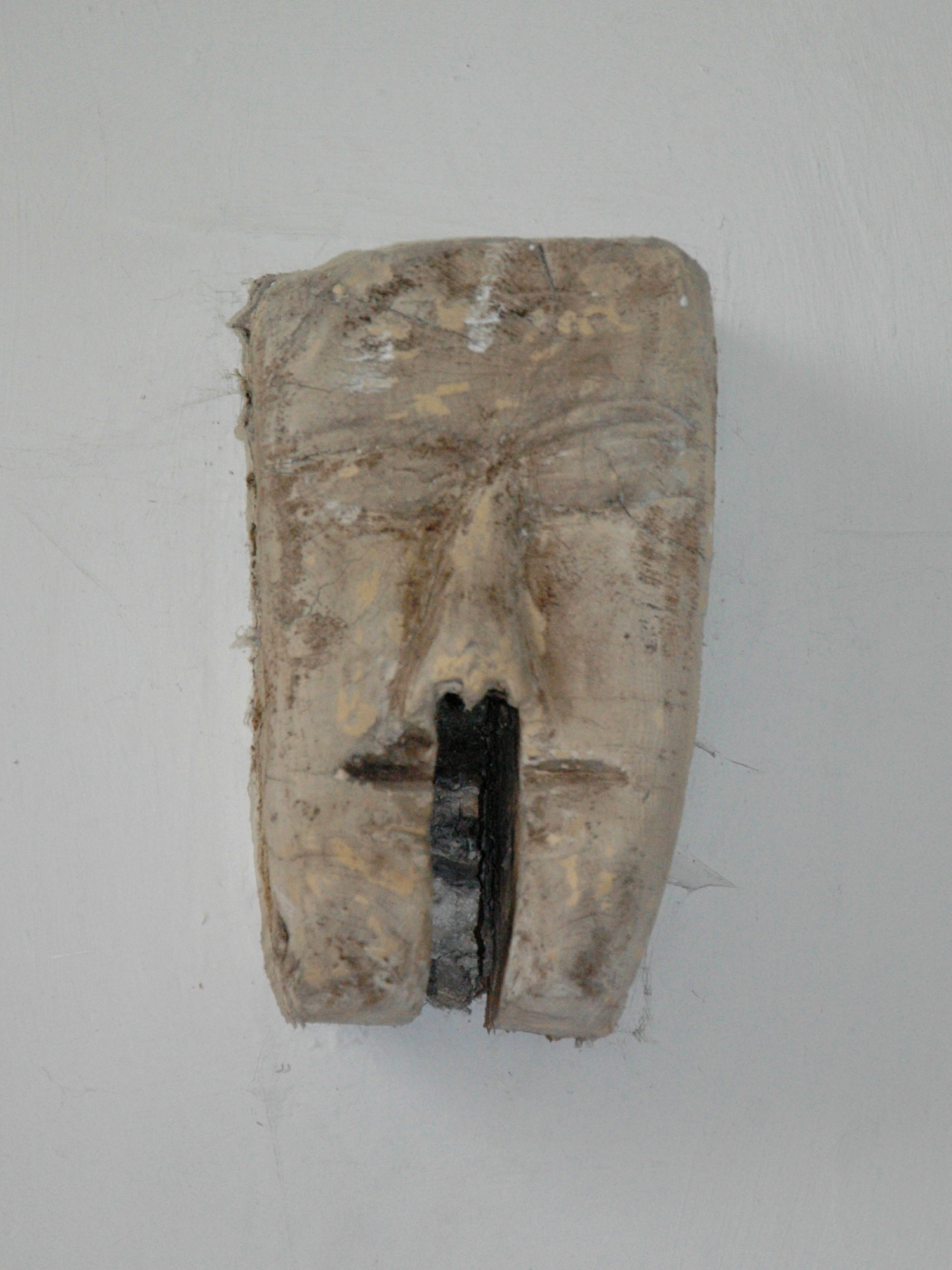
One of a set of Medieval corbels in the chancel that supported the Lenten veil. This one may have included a pulley.

=== Church of England ===
By 1185–86 Sydenham was a chapelry of the prebendary parish of Thame. In the English Reformation the Dissolution of Colleges Act 1547 (1 Edw. 6. c. 14) dissolved all prebendaries, and the tithes of Sydenham passed to the Wenman family. The earliest parts of the Church of England parish church of Saint Mary are Norman corbels in the walls of the chancel. However, in 1293 it was reported that the church was "in ruins" and a rebuilding had just begun. This was carried out in the Early English Gothic style. The church retains most of the lancet windows inserted during the rebuilding. The timber-framed bell tower was built at the same time. It is one of a number of wooden bell-towers in South Oxfordshire. The others include St Helen's, Berrick Salome, All Saints, Didcot; St Nicolas, Rotherfield Greys and St Mary the Virgin, Waterperry.

Early in the 14th century a Decorated Gothic east window was inserted in the chancel and a rood screen and rood loft were added. Late in the 15th century the nave was given a hammerbeam roof. The rood screen and loft were removed in 1840. In the chancel is a set of Medieval corbels that formerly supported a Lenten veil to screen the altar. Such veils were discontinued in the English Reformation, and these corbels are a rare survival.

Sherwood and Pevsner state that the architect John Billing restored St Mary's in 1856, but the Victoria County History states that the restoration was in 1877. By both accounts the tower was rebuilt, the chancel and nave lengthened and a vestry and south porch added. the Victoria County History adds that the tower and its arches were moved some distance to the west. The two lancet windows west of the south porch were added during the restoration, and the 14th-century style west window of the nave was probably added at the same time. The church is a Grade II* listed building. Its parish is now part of a single benefice with the parishes of Aston Rowant, Chinnor and Crowell.

=== Non-conformist ===
There were nonconformist congregations in Sydenham by 1804. A Baptist chapel was built in 1825 and a rival second one in 1844. One of the Baptist chapels closed in about 1855, but by 1864 the other was still going as a Particular Baptist chapel. It was rebuilt as Ebenezer Chapel in 1881 and a Sunday school was added in 1883. It was still open in 1920 but had closed by 1932 and was sold in 1936. Its owner leased the chapel to a Methodist congregation from 1949 and sold it to them in 1957. In 1958 it was a member of the Thame and Watlington Methodist Circuit, but it has since closed and is now a private house. Sydenham had a Primitive Methodist chapel by 1866. It was still open in 1910, but no subsequent record of it is known.

== Social and economic history ==
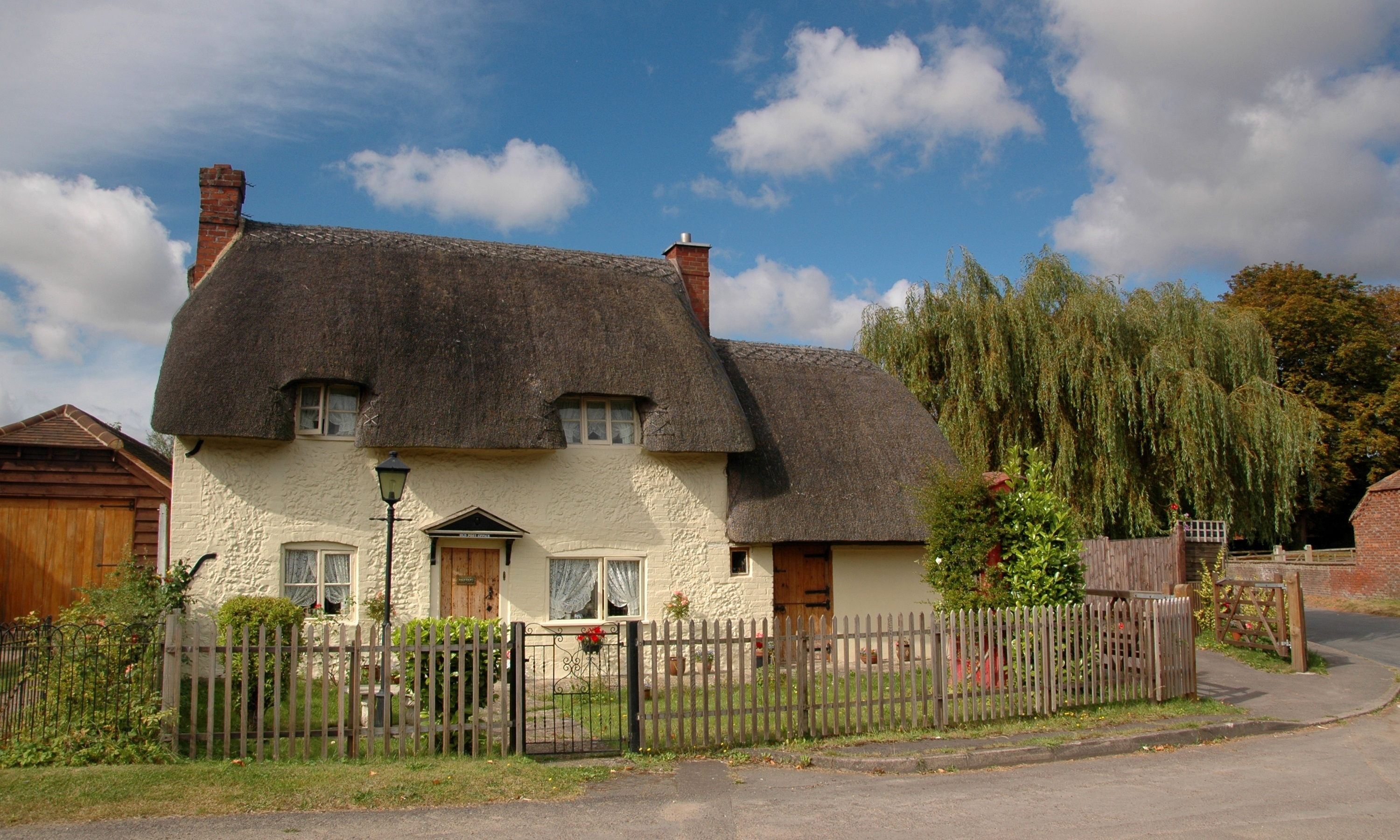
This 18th-century thatched cottage was the village post office, but has now been turned back into a private house

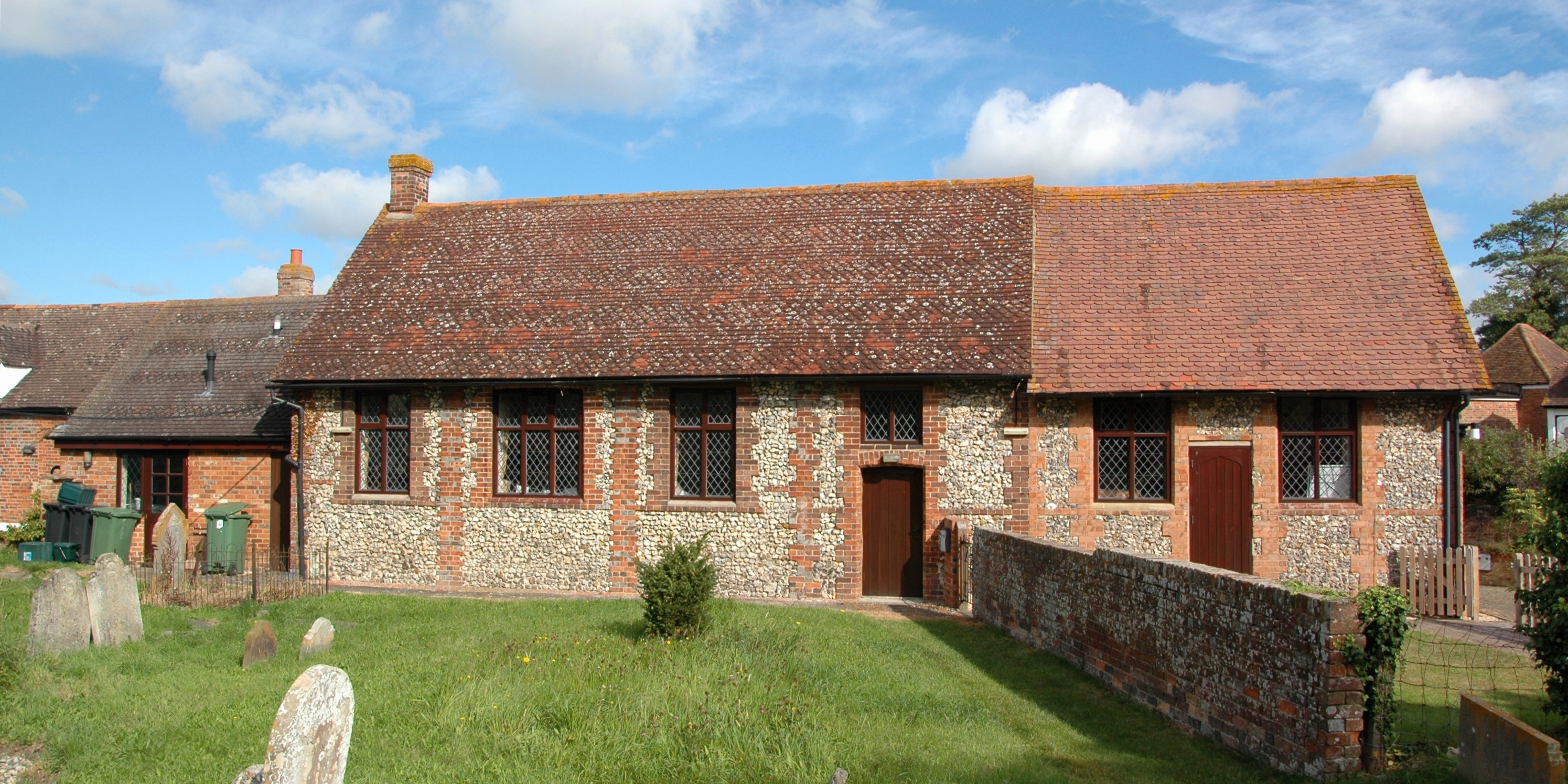
The Wenman School was built in 1849 and enlarged in 1886. It is now the village hall. The extension on the right is modern.

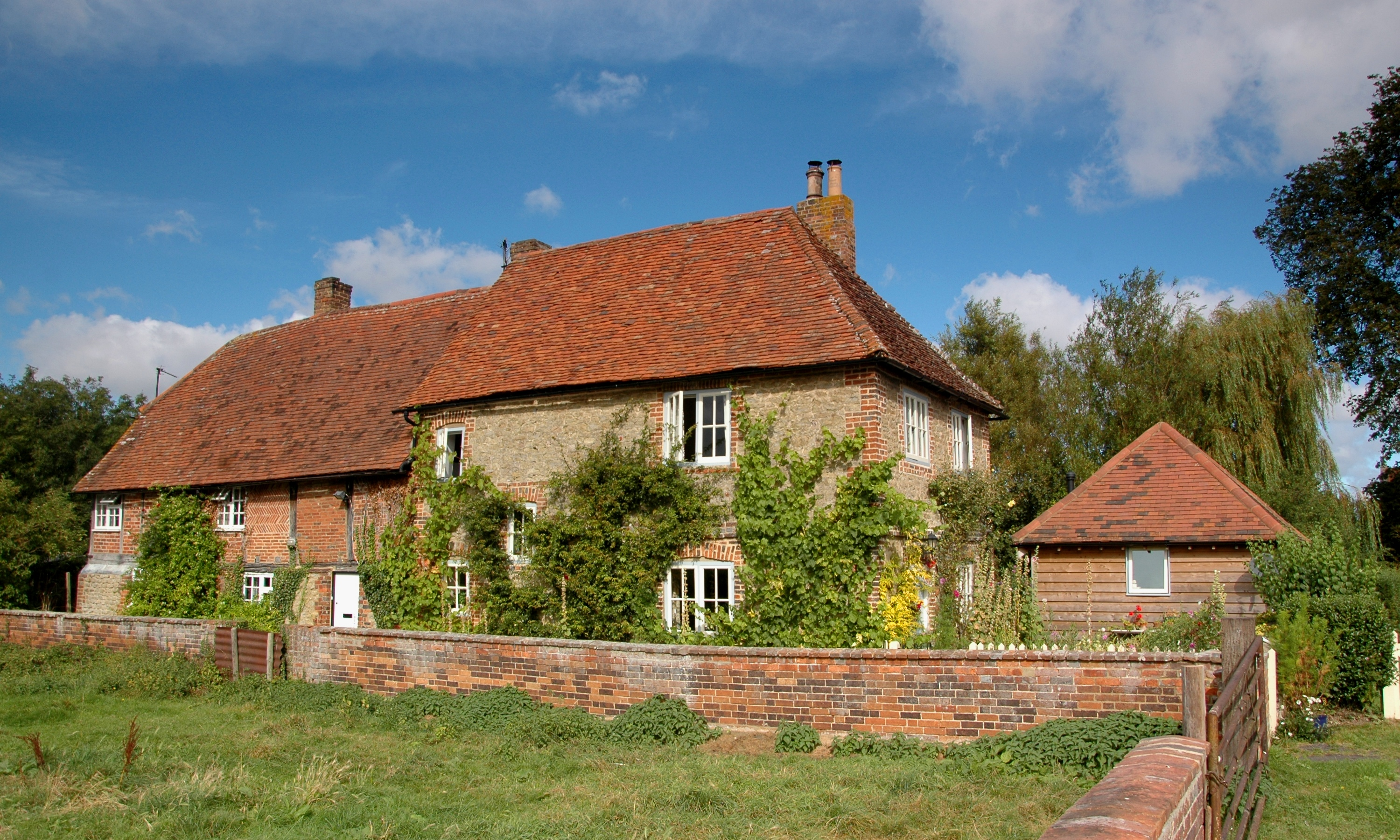
17th- and 18th-century houses south of St Mary's parish church

By the 12th century a brook through the centre of the parish had been dammed to form a millpond to drive a water mill. In the 12th and 13th century the millers were the Grimbaud family, and thereafter it retained the name Grimbaud's Mill. The Mill House is 18th-century. By 1891 a steam engine had been installed, but the mill was still also using water power in 1917. The mill remained in use part-time until 1945. A number of 16th- and 17th-century cottages survive in the village. Some are timber-framed and the oldest has a cruck frame. The walls of some of the timber-framed cottages have lath and plaster infill; others are filled with brick nogging. The village has also a number of 18th-century houses, built either wholly of brick or of brick and flint.

In 1849 a National School was built in the village. The Wykeham-Musgrave family provided the land, Baroness Wenman paid for the building and it was thereafter known as the Wenman School. The school was enlarged in 1886 and reorganised as a junior and infants' school in 1929. Thereafter the number of pupils was small, and in 1948 the school was closed.

By 1851 the village had two public houses: The Sun, and the Four Horse Shoes. The Sun had closed by 1891 and the Four Horse Shoes followed in 1912. However, The Crown Inn had opened by 1939 and continues to trade today. Until the 20th century the parish was almost entirely agricultural. By the 1950s numerous people from Sydenham were working at Chinnor Cement Works, but this closed in 1989.

== Notable residents ==
BBC presenter Fiona Bruce and her husband Nigel Sharrocks have a second home in Sydenham.

== Sources ==
- Lobel, Mary D, ed. (1964). A History of the County of Oxford. Victoria County History. Vol. 8: Lewknor and Pyrton Hundreds. London: Oxford University Press for the Institute of Historical Research. pp. 55–80, 116–127.
- Sherwood, Jennifer; Pevsner, Nikolaus (1974). Oxfordshire. The Buildings of England. Harmondsworth: Penguin Books. pp. 801–802. ISBN 0-14-071045-0.
