= Postcombe =

Village in Oxfordshire, England

Coordinates: 51.692°N 0.973°W

- Location within Oxfordshire
- OS grid reference: SU709997
- Civil parish: Lewknor
- District: South Oxfordshire
- Shire county: Oxfordshire
- Region: South East
- Country: England
- Sovereign state: United Kingdom
- Post town: Thame
- Postcode district: OX9
- Dialling code: 01844
- Police: Thames Valley
- Fire: Oxfordshire
- Ambulance: South Central
- UK Parliament: Henley
- Website: / postcombe.com - village page

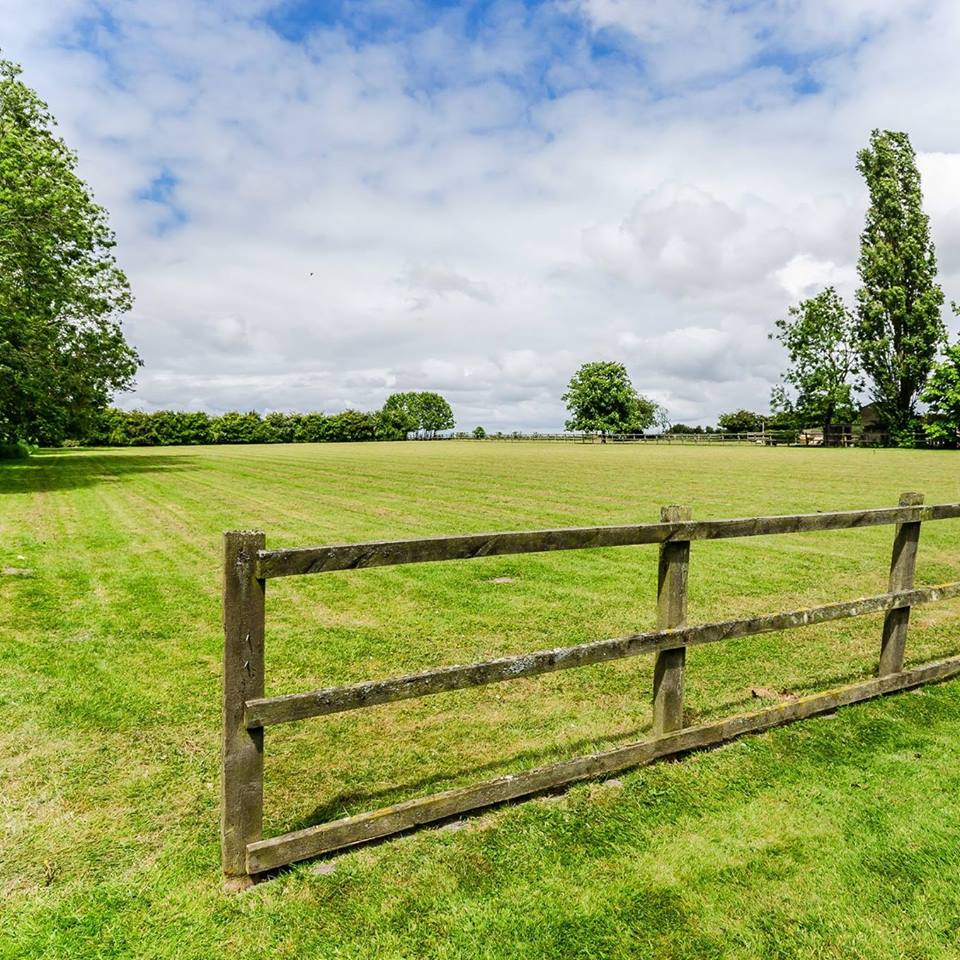
Postcombe, Oxfordshire

Postcombe is a village in the civil parish of Lewknor. It is approximately 4 miles (6.4 km) south of Thame in Oxfordshire, England, and about 2 miles (3.2 km) from Lewknor. It is on the A40 road with the Chiltern Hills to the east and the M40 motorway just to the south.

In 1971–73, the M40 Archaeological research group excavating a site at Postcombe found three Saxon graves, one of which was of a child. A bronze buckle in one of the graves dated the burials to the 7th century.

On the morning of 18 June 1643, Royalist cavalry based in Oxford attacked a Parliamentary garrison based in the village, setting fire to some of the houses.

The village has a public house, England's Rose, that was formerly known as, The Feathers. There is also a filling station. The current Lord of the Manor is Nigel Ross Parsons.
