= Grade II* listed buildings in South Oxfordshire =

There are over 20,000 Grade II* listed buildings in England. This page is a list of these buildings in the district of South Oxfordshire in Oxfordshire.

== South Oxfordshire ==
Name	Location	Type	Completed (Note: The date given is the date used by Historic England as significant for the initial building or that of an important part in the structure's description.)	Date designated	Grid ref. (Note: The grid reference is based on the British national grid reference system, sometimes known as OSGB36, used by the Ordnance Survey.) Geo-coordinates	Entry number (Note: The "List Entry Number" is a unique number assigned to each listed building and scheduled monument by Historic England.)	Image
Adwell House	Adwell, South Oxfordshire	House	Early 18th century	18 July 1963	SU6967799636; 51°41′28″N 0°59′36″W	1059699	Adwell House More images
Church of St Peter and St Paul	Aston Rowant	Parish Church	12th century	18 July 1963	SU7269099016; 51°41′07″N 0°57′00″W	1368878	Church of St Peter and St Paul More images
Church of St Michael	Aston Tirrold	Parish Church	11th century	14 June 1963	SU5570386071; 51°34′15″N 1°11′52″W	1286159	Church of St Michael More images
Copsestile Farmhouse	Aston Tirrold	Farmhouse	Late 17th century	9 April 1952	SU5532385947; 51°34′11″N 1°12′11″W	1059312	Upload Photo
The Cottage	Aston Tirrold	Box Frame House	1286	13 January 1986	SU5564785785; 51°34′06″N 1°11′55″W	1059301	Upload Photo
The Manor House	Aston Tirrold	House	C20	9 April 1952	SU5579786062; 51°34′14″N 1°11′47″W	1369079	The Manor House More images
Church of All Saints	Aston Upthorpe	parish church	12th century	14 June 1963	SU5528086143; 51°34′17″N 1°12′14″W	1369068	Church of All Saints More images
Bridge and Retaining Walls to Middle Moat at Beckley Park	Beckley, Beckley and Stowood	Wall	16th century	18 July 1963	SP5771111969; 51°48′12″N 1°09′52″W	1047643	Bridge and Retaining Walls to Middle Moat at Beckley Park
Wick Farmhouse, Well House about 30m to North	Beckley and Stowood	Well House	Late C17/early 18th century	21 December 1956	SP5527508564; 51°46′23″N 1°12′01″W	1047637	Wick Farmhouse, Well House about 30m to North More images
Church of St Helen	Benson	parish church	12th century	18 July 1963	SU6150691637; 51°37′13″N 1°06′47″W	1369032	Church of St Helen More images
Fifield Manor	Fifield	House	Early 19th century	18 July 1963	SU6308192152; 51°37′29″N 1°05′25″W	1059361	Fifield Manor
Monarchs Court	Benson	House	17th century	1 January 1971	SU6182091690; 51°37′14″N 1°06′30″W	1194239	Upload Photo
Church of St Helen	Berrick Salome	parish church	11th century	18 July 1963	SU6237694277; 51°38′38″N 1°06′00″W	1059273	Church of St Helen More images
Church of St Agatha	Brightwell-cum-Sotwell	parish church	12th century	14 June 1963	SU5780390804; 51°36′47″N 1°10′00″W	1181581	Church of St Agatha More images
Church of St James	Sotwell, Brightwell-cum-Sotwell	parish church	c. 1884	9 February 1988	SU5861990696; 51°36′43″N 1°09′17″W	1181603	Church of St James More images
Shillingford Bridge	Shillingford, Brightwell-cum-Sotwell	Bridge	c. 1826	9 April 1952	SU5965992036; 51°37′26″N 1°08′23″W	1059632	Shillingford Bridge More images
Britwell House and attached Walls and Coach House	Britwell Salome	Country House	1728	18 July 1963	SU6677792455; 51°37′37″N 1°02′12″W	1059503	Britwell House and attached Walls and Coach House More images
Britwell Park, monument about 90m south-west of Britwell House	Britwell Salome	Column	1764	18 July 1963	SU6686392386; 51°37′35″N 1°02′08″W	1059462	Britwell Park, monument about 90m south-west of Britwell House
Britwell Park, obelisk about 130m north of Britwell House	Britwell Salome	Obelisk	Mid 18th century	18 July 1963	SU6678892598; 51°37′42″N 1°02′11″W	1059461	Upload Photo
Church of St Nicholas	Emmington, Chinnor	church	14th century	18 July 1963	SP7423002370; 51°42′55″N 0°55′37″W	1368901	Church of St Nicholas More images
Church of St Michael and All Angels	Clifton Hampden	parish church	13th century	18 July 1963	SU5472295528; 51°39′21″N 1°12′37″W	1368837	Church of St Michael and All Angels More images
Clifton Hampden Bridge	Clifton Hampden	Bridge	c. 1864	18 July 1963	SU5472395382; 51°39′16″N 1°12′37″W	1059815	Clifton Hampden Bridge More images
Church of St Mary	Newnham Murren, Crowmarsh	Parish Church	12th century	9 February 1959	SU6103788488; 51°35′31″N 1°07′13″W	1285860	Church of St Mary More images
Julius Gottlieb Gallery and Boathouse at Carmel College	Crowmarsh	Boat House	1969-1970	9 December 1999	SU6081487754; 51°35′07″N 1°07′25″W	1379942	Julius Gottlieb Gallery and Boathouse at Carmel College More images
The Queens Head Public House	Newnham Murren, Crowmarsh	Public House	14th century	24 October 1951	SU6163289212; 51°35′54″N 1°06′42″W	1194102	The Queens Head Public House More images
Denton House	Denton, Cuddesdon and Denton	Country House	16th century	18 July 1963	SP5934402559; 51°43′07″N 1°08′32″W	1369197	Denton House More images
Stable Block at Denton House	Denton, Cuddesdon and Denton	Stable	Mid 18th century	18 July 1963	SP5937302588; 51°43′08″N 1°08′31″W	1047675	Stable Block at Denton House More images
Garden Wall of Denton House	Denton, Cuddesdon and Denton	Gate	Late 17th century	18 July 1963	SP5925702586; 51°43′08″N 1°08′37″W	1047674	Upload Photo
Ripon College	Cuddesdon, Cuddesdon and Denton	College	1853-4	19 January 1973	SP5992303235; 51°43′29″N 1°08′02″W	1047715	Ripon College More images
Vicarage at Ripon College	Cuddesdon, Cuddesdon and Denton	Vicarage	1853-4	19 January 1973	SP5992803140; 51°43′26″N 1°08′02″W	1369176	Upload Photo
Culham Manor	Culham	Hall House	15th century	18 July 1963	SU5017794908; 51°39′03″N 1°16′34″W	1285637	Culham Manor More images
Culham Old Bridge	Culham	Bridge	c. 1416	18 July 1963	SU5009495758; 51°39′30″N 1°16′38″W	1368838	Culham Old Bridge More images
Culham Station Ticket Office and Waiting Room	Culham	Railway station (incorporating letter box)	c. 1844	20 May 1975	SU5292095276; 51°39′14″N 1°14′11″W	1059789	Culham Station Ticket Office and Waiting Room More images
Dovecote about 75m west of Culham Manor	Culham	Dovecote	1685	18 July 1963	SU5008694882; 51°39′02″N 1°16′39″W	1059793	Upload Photo
Church of All Saints	Didcot	parish church	12th century	14 June 1963	SU5196690506; 51°36′40″N 1°15′03″W	1047918	Church of All Saints More images
Abbey Guest House	Dorchester on Thames	Guest House	Late 15th century	18 July 1963	SU5788094216; 51°38′38″N 1°09′54″W	1047864	Abbey Guest House More images
Bullyn	Dorchester-on-Thames	House	16th century	18 July 1963	SU5775294364; 51°38′42″N 1°10′00″W	1194567	Upload Photo
Church of St Birinus	Dorchester-on-Thames	Roman Catholic church	1849	14 May 1986	SU5790093936; 51°38′29″N 1°09′53″W	1369090	Church of St Birinus More images
The Bridge and Causeway	Dorchester-on-Thames	Bridge	1814-16	18 July 1963	SU5803493872; 51°38′26″N 1°09′46″W	1286225	The Bridge and Causeway More images
The George Hotel	Dorchester-on-Thames	Inn	Late C15/early 16th century	18 July 1963	SU5782394231; 51°38′38″N 1°09′57″W	1369118	The George Hotel More images
55 High Street	Dorchester-on-Thames	House	1610	18 July 1963	SU5775594358; 51°38′42″N 1°10′00″W	1047840	Upload Photo
Barn about 15m north-west of Waterside House	Drayton St. Leonard	Aisled Barn	15th century	18 July 1963	SU5977896047; 51°39′36″N 1°08′14″W	1194598	Upload Photo
Lower Grange	Drayton St. Leonard	House	17th century	18 July 1963	SU5982395511; 51°39′19″N 1°08′12″W	1059796	Upload Photo
Church of St Peter	Easington	church	Early 14th century	18 July 1963	SU6618697063; 51°40′06″N 1°02′40″W	1059753	Church of St Peter More images
Chest Tomb to Phillips Family and Railings about 10m north of Church of St Andrew	East Hagbourne	Chest Tomb	c. 1736	4 November 1986	SU5254388214; 51°35′25″N 1°14′35″W	1180853	Chest Tomb to Phillips Family and Railings about 10m north of Church of St Andrew More images
Hagbourne Mill Farm Mill	East Hagbourne	Watermill	Earlier	12 June 1987	SU5379587543; 51°35′03″N 1°13′30″W	1368811	Upload Photo
Village Cross	East Hagbourne	Village Cross	15th century	9 April 1952	SU5262588278; 51°35′27″N 1°14′30″W	1180947	Village Cross More images
Church of St Thomas Becket	Elsfield	parish church	Late 12th century	18 July 1963	SP5405309978; 51°47′09″N 1°13′04″W	1369209	Church of St Thomas Becket More images
Ewelme Manor	Ewelme	House	c. 1450	18 July 1963	SU6438391449; 51°37′05″N 1°04′17″W	1194482	Upload Photo
Eyot House	Sonning Eye, Eye and Dunsden	House	1902	6 May 1997	SU7507075974; 51°28′40″N 0°55′14″W	1141141	Eyot House
Row Lane Farmhouse	Dunsden, Eye and Dunsden	Farmhouse	Late 17th century	24 October 1951	SU7323677425; 51°29′28″N 0°56′48″W	1285229	Row Lane Farmhouse
Church of St Nicholas	Forest Hill, Forest Hill with Shotover	parish church	12th century	18 July 1963	SP5823207504; 51°45′48″N 1°09′27″W	1047621	Church of St Nicholas More images
Gateway and Flanking Walls about 60m east of Forest Hill House	Forest Hill, Forest Hill with Shotover	Gate	Early 17th century	18 July 1963	SP5822107523; 51°45′48″N 1°09′28″W	1181253	Upload Photo
Gothic Temple about 600m east of Shotover Park	Shotover, Forest Hill with Shotover	Boat House	c. 1740	18 July 1963	SP5899406726; 51°45′22″N 1°08′48″W	1047629	Upload Photo
Octagonal Temple about 250m south-west of Shotover Park	Shotover, Forest Hill with Shotover	Garden Temple	c. 1835	18 July 1963	SP5822706531; 51°45′16″N 1°09′28″W	1047632	Octagonal Temple about 250m south-west of Shotover Park More images
The Obelisk about 200m west of Shotover Park	Shotover, Forest Hill with Shotover	Obelisk	c. 1735	18 July 1963	SP5822106714; 51°45′22″N 1°09′29″W	1181640	The Obelisk about 200m west of Shotover Park
Church of St Mary	Southend, Garsington	parish church	c. 1200	18 July 1963	SP5806002017; 51°42′50″N 1°09′40″W	1284943	Church of St Mary More images
Manor House	Southend, Garsington	Manor House	Early 17th century or earlier	18 July 1963	SP5822001958; 51°42′48″N 1°09′31″W	1047686	Manor House More images
Rycote House	Rycote, Great Haseley	Timber Framed House	Early 16th century	18 July 1963	SP6666704714; 51°44′14″N 1°02′09″W	1047513	Rycote House More images
The Crown House	Great Haseley	House	Mid C20	21 May 1985	SP6431301733; 51°42′38″N 1°04′14″W	1180888	Upload Photo
The Manor House	Great Haseley	Country House	Late 17th century	18 July 1963	SP6437101739; 51°42′39″N 1°04′11″W	1285279	The Manor House
The Old Rectory	Great Haseley	House	15th century	21 May 1985	SP6415501823; 51°42′41″N 1°04′22″W	1369274	Upload Photo
Tower and Wall about 20m north-east of Rycote House	Rycote, Great Haseley	Country House	1521	18 July 1963	SP6669504739; 51°44′15″N 1°02′08″W	1180716	Upload Photo
Walled Garden about 30m west of Manor Farmhouse	North Weston, Great Haseley	Gate Pier	Early 18th century	21 May 1985	SP6815105466; 51°44′38″N 1°00′52″W	1369269	Upload Photo
Entrance Gates and Flanking Walls about 70m south-west of Manor House	Great Milton	Gate	Late 16th century	18 July 1963	SP6279202361; 51°42′59″N 1°05′33″W	1047486	Upload Photo
Schoolhouse and attached Infants School	Great Milton	School	Early 17th century	18 July 1963	SP6295002937; 51°43′18″N 1°05′24″W	1047492	Schoolhouse and attached Infants School
The Great House	Great Milton	House	16th century	18 July 1963	SP6274802394; 51°43′00″N 1°05′35″W	1369263	Upload Photo
The Manor House and Garden Walls to Rear	Great Milton	Country House	Late 15th century	18 July 1963	SP6284602404; 51°43′01″N 1°05′30″W	1369260	Upload Photo
The Priory and attached Steps, Walls and Gateway	Great Milton	House	16th century	18 July 1963	SP6295702610; 51°43′07″N 1°05′24″W	1181043	Upload Photo
Harpsden Court	Harpsden	House	Described c1540	24 October 1951	SU7637280852; 51°31′17″N 0°54′02″W	1047412	Harpsden Court
Angel Hotel including attached Medieval Arch	Henley-on-Thames	Hotel	Late 12th century	25 January 1951	SU7632182627; 51°32′15″N 0°54′04″W	1047786	Angel Hotel including attached Medieval Arch More images
Countess Gardens	Henley-on-Thames	House	18th century	21 January 1951	SU7609082967; 51°32′26″N 0°54′15″W	1047031	Countess Gardens
Elm House, Ruperts Elm, Ruperts Guard	Henley-on-Thames	House	1951	25 January 1951	SU7608883046; 51°32′28″N 0°54′15″W	1369157	Upload Photo
Former Old White Hart Hotel	Henley-on-Thames	Courtyard House/ Shop	Extant by 1428	25 January 1951	SU7614482682; 51°32′16″N 0°54′13″W	1369133	Former Old White Hart Hotel More images
Gate Pier and Connecting Wall at the Lodge	Henley-on-Thames	Gate Pier	Late 18th century	25 January 1951	SU7604483168; 51°32′32″N 0°54′18″W	1219224	Upload Photo
Longlands	Henley-on-Thames	House	Older House	25 January 1951	SU7622682673; 51°32′16″N 0°54′08″W	1369135	Longlands More images
Northfield House	Henley-on-Thames	House	Early 19th century	25 January 1951	SU7603683007; 51°32′27″N 0°54′18″W	1047752	Northfield House More images
Old Brewery House	Henley-on-Thames	Brewery/Hotel	18th century	25 January 1951	SU7626782802; 51°32′20″N 0°54′06″W	1291507	Old Brewery House More images
Parish Church of St Mary the Virgin	Henley-on-Thames	Parish Church	13th century	25 January 1951	SU7627182672; 51°32′16″N 0°54′06″W	1218999	Parish Church of St Mary the Virgin More images
Phyllis Court Lodge	Henley-on-Thames	Gate Lodge	Late 18th century	25 January 1951	SU7606383164; 51°32′32″N 0°54′17″W	1047772	Upload Photo
Phyllis Court Lodge Gate Pier and Connecting Wall	Henley-on-Thames	Gate Pier	Late 18th century	25 January 1951	SU7605883164; 51°32′32″N 0°54′17″W	1369125	Upload Photo
Rectory	Henley-on-Thames	Vicarage	17th century	25 January 1951	SU7630582606; 51°32′14″N 0°54′04″W	1219566	Rectory
The Lodge	Henley-on-Thames	Gate Lodge	Late 18th century	25 January 1951	SU7603983171; 51°32′32″N 0°54′18″W	1369124	Upload Photo
The Maltsters House and Granary Cottage	Henley-on-Thames	House	16th century	28 October 1974	SU7609182933; 51°32′25″N 0°54′15″W	1218201	The Maltsters House and Granary Cottage
The Old Bell	Henley-on-Thames	Jettied House	1325	28 October 1974	SU7606482707; 51°32′17″N 0°54′17″W	1369482	The Old Bell More images
Town Hall	Henley-on-Thames	Town Hall	1900	25 January 1951	SU7594682619; 51°32′15″N 0°54′23″W	1047802	Town Hall More images
32, Bell Street	Henley-on-Thames	House	18th century	21 January 1951	SU7607282751; 51°32′19″N 0°54′16″W	1047026	32, Bell Street
18, Hart Street	Henley-on-Thames	House	Earlier Building	28 October 1974	SU7614682640; 51°32′15″N 0°54′13″W	1218815	Upload Photo
Church of St Giles	Horspath	parish church	Late 12th century	18 July 1963	SP5714104879; 51°44′23″N 1°10′26″W	1047462	Church of St Giles More images
Braziers Park House	Ipsden	Country House	Late 17th century	24 October 1951	SU6354784354; 51°33′16″N 1°05′05″W	1059531	Braziers Park House More images
Church of St Mary	Ipsden	parish church	12th century	9 February 1959	SU6339485769; 51°34′02″N 1°05′12″W	1059535	Church of St Mary More images
The Old Vicarage	Ipsden	House	Late 17th century	24 October 1951	SU6337385340; 51°33′48″N 1°05′14″W	1285724	The Old Vicarage More images
Cane End House	Cane End, Kidmore End	House	Late 16th century	24 October 1951	SU6781079442; 51°30′35″N 1°01′27″W	1368957	Upload Photo
Chalk House	Chalkhouse Green, Kidmore End	House	Early 18th century	24 October 1951	SU7128078262; 51°29′56″N 0°58′28″W	1059545	Upload Photo
Cross Farmhouse	Kidmore End	Farmhouse	15th century	16 August 1985	SU6975878634; 51°30′08″N 0°59′47″W	1368978	Upload Photo
Kidmore House	Kidmore End	House	Late 17th century	24 October 1951	SU7042978715; 51°30′11″N 0°59′12″W	1194422	Kidmore House More images
Manor House	Little Milton	Manor House	15th century	18 July 1963	SP6196100723; 51°42′07″N 1°06′17″W	1369166	Upload Photo
Church of St Peter	Little Wittenham	parish church	14th century	14 June 1963	SU5663893449; 51°38′13″N 1°10′59″W	1285238	Church of St Peter More images
Garden Wall Fernhouse Archway and Gateway about 20m north-east of Mapledurham House	Mapledurham	Gate	Early 18th century	24 October 1951	SU6714476759; 51°29′09″N 1°02′04″W	1059520	Upload Photo
Stirrups	Mapledurham	House	17th century	24 October 1951	SU6732978120; 51°29′53″N 1°01′53″W	1368980	Upload Photo
The Almshouse	Mapledurham	House	Early 17th century	24 October 1951	SU6705376814; 51°29′11″N 1°02′09″W	1059522	The Almshouse More images
The Mill	Mapledurham	Watermill	15th century	24 October 1951	SU6693676750; 51°29′09″N 1°02′15″W	1059523	The Mill More images
The Old Manor House	Mapledurham	Jettied House	15th century	24 October 1951	SU6703476622; 51°29′05″N 1°02′10″W	1368945	Upload Photo
Whittles Farmhouse	Mapledurham	Farmhouse	15th century	24 October 1951	SU6708578363; 51°30′01″N 1°02′06″W	1059515	Upload Photo
Baldon House, East and West Wing	Marsh Baldon	Manor House	16th century	18 July 1963	SU5614299024; 51°41′14″N 1°11′21″W	1048058	Upload Photo
Church of St Peter	Marsh Baldon	parish church	14th century	18 July 1963	SU5615699099; 51°41′16″N 1°11′21″W	1048056	Church of St Peter More images
Sphinx Hill	Moulsford	House	1999	20 June 2024	SU5921983578; 51°32′51″N 1°08′45″W	1485669	Sphinx Hill More images
Brick Kiln	Nettlebed	Brick Kiln	Late 17th century	30 April 1973	SU7016686836; 51°34′34″N 0°59′20″W	1181146	Brick Kiln More images
Entrance Gates at Newington House	Newington	Gate	C20	18 July 1963	SU6091596432; 51°39′48″N 1°07′14″W	1286245	Entrance Gates at Newington House
Newington House	Newington	Country House	c. 1635	18 July 1963	SU6086196460; 51°39′49″N 1°07′17″W	1048070	Newington House More images
Church of the Holy Trinity	Nuffield	parish church	12th century	9 February 1959	SU6676487345; 51°34′52″N 1°02′16″W	1059326	Church of the Holy Trinity More images
Church of All Saints	Nuneham Park, Nuneham Courtenay	parish church	1764	18 July 1963	SU5415498261; 51°40′50″N 1°13′05″W	1286134	Church of All Saints More images
Nuneham House	Nuneham Park, Nuneham Courtenay	Country House	1757	18 July 1963	SU5406598072; 51°40′44″N 1°13′10″W	1286179	Nuneham House More images
Church of St Mary	Pyrton	parish church	Early 12th century	18 July 1963	SU6874095693; 51°39′21″N 1°00′28″W	1059730	Church of St Mary More images
Pyrton Manor	Pyrton	House	Late Elizabethan	18 July 1963	SU6859095665; 51°39′20″N 1°00′36″W	1368846	Pyrton Manor
Church of St Nicholas	Rotherfield Greys	parish church	Romanesque	9 February 1959	SU7264882316; 51°32′06″N 0°57′14″W	1047387	Church of St Nicholas More images
Greys Court, Cromwellian Stables about 40m east	Rotherfield Greys	Tea Room	17th century	13 February 1985	SU7253383404; 51°32′42″N 0°57′20″W	1181230	Upload Photo
Borocourt Hospital (Wyfold Court)	Rotherfield Peppard	Country House	1874-1884	13 February 1985	SU6831182402; 51°32′11″N 1°00′59″W	1180805	Borocourt Hospital (Wyfold Court) More images
Church of All Saints	Rotherfield Peppard	Village Hall	C20	13 February 1985	SU7136881513; 51°31′41″N 0°58′21″W	1369298	Church of All Saints More images
Church of St Andrew	Sandford-on-Thames	parish church	Late 11th century	18 July 1963	SP5337201750; 51°42′43″N 1°13′44″W	1047633	Church of St Andrew More images
Church of St Peter and St Paul	Shiplake	parish church	13th century	13 February 1985	SU7674678248; 51°29′53″N 0°53′45″W	1059595	Church of St Peter and St Paul More images
The Summer House (the Orangery)	Shirburn Castle, Shirburn	Orangery	Circa 1720-1740s	15 December 1997	SU6930196186; 51°39′37″N 0°59′58″W	1119718	Upload Photo
Manor House	South Moreton	Cruck House	Late 14th century	9 April 1952	SU5623388284; 51°35′26″N 1°11′23″W	1368808	Upload Photo
Church of St Andrew	South Stoke	parish church	13th century	9 February 1959	SU5989783589; 51°32′53″N 1°08′15″W	1193919	Church of St Andrew More images
Dovecote about 35m north-east of Manor House	South Stoke	Dovecote	17th century	24 October 1951	SU5990883644; 51°32′55″N 1°08′15″W	1193914	Upload Photo
Moulsford Railway Bridge (MLN14730)	South Stoke	railway viaduct	1840	9 February 1959	SU5953984714; 51°33′29″N 1°08′33″W	1285970	Moulsford Railway Bridge (MLN14730) More images
Camoys Court	Chiselhampton, Stadhampton	Farmhouse	17th century	18 July 1963	SU5920398588; 51°40′59″N 1°08′42″W	1193652	Camoys Court More images
Chiselhampton House	Chiselhampton, Stadhampton	Country House	1768	18 July 1963	SU5933699150; 51°41′17″N 1°08′35″W	1048023	Upload Photo
Church of St Katherine	Chiselhampton, Stadhampton	church	1762	18 July 1963	SU5922699229; 51°41′19″N 1°08′41″W	1193807	Church of St Katherine More images
Farm Building and attached Walls beside Menmarsh Road, from about 40m south to 65m east of Manor Farmhouse	Stanton St. John	Wall	C17/C18	5 June 1985	SP5778709414; 51°46′49″N 1°09′50″W	1182383	Farm Building and attached Walls beside Menmarsh Road, from about 40m south to 65m east of Manor Farmhouse
Manor Farmhouse	Stanton St. John	Farmhouse	14th century	18 July 1963	SP5777609453; 51°46′51″N 1°09′50″W	1047578	Upload Photo
Pavilion about 50m south-east of Woodperry House	Woodperry, Stanton St. John	Pavilion	Early 18th century	18 July 1963	SP5759410416; 51°47′22″N 1°09′59″W	1182626	Upload Photo
Rectory Farmhouse	Stanton St. John	Farmhouse	Late C16/early 17th century	18 July 1963	SP5779309396; 51°46′49″N 1°09′49″W	1182251	Rectory Farmhouse More images
Church of St Botolph	Swyncombe	Bell Tower	Early 14th century	9 February 1959	SU6824690188; 51°36′23″N 1°00′57″W	1180499	Church of St Botolph More images
Church of St Mary	Sydenham	Parish Church	13th century	18 July 1963	SP7296301839; 51°42′38″N 0°56′43″W	1180738	Church of St Mary More images
The Swan Hotel	Tetsworth	Restaurant	Early 17th century	18 July 1963	SP6873801793; 51°42′38″N 1°00′24″W	1368894	The Swan Hotel More images
Nos 34 (Gallup Poll) and 35 (Garfield), High St	Thame	House	Late 17th century	24 April 1951	SP7081705726; 51°44′45″N 0°58′32″W	1285106	Upload Photo
Lashlake House	Thame	House	Late 18th century	24 April 1951	SP7052006393; 51°45′06″N 0°58′47″W	1368753	Lashlake House
Master's Court (former Lord William's Grammar School)	Church Road, Thame	Grammar School	1569	24 April 1951	SP7038206191; 51°45′00″N 0°58′55″W	1194095	Master's Court (former Lord William's Grammar School) More images
Solar and attached Wall about 15m south-west of the Prebendal	Thame	Hall House	13th century	24 April 1951	SP7020106363; 51°45′06″N 0°59′04″W	1047943	Upload Photo
Spirit	Thame	Tithe barn (converted to office space)	Late 16th century	24 April 1951	SP7035606251; 51°45′02″N 0°58′56″W	1047980	Spirit More images
The Birdcage Public House	Thame	Public House	Early 16th century	24 April 1951	SP7068505878; 51°44′50″N 0°58′39″W	1047982	The Birdcage Public House More images
The Prebendal	Thame	Clergy House	13th century	24 April 1951	SP7019606388; 51°45′06″N 0°59′04″W	1368778	The Prebendal More images
The Spread Eagle Hotel	Thame	Hotel	Early 18th century	24 April 1951	SP7066005844; 51°44′49″N 0°58′40″W	1047984	The Spread Eagle Hotel More images
The Swan Hotel	Thame	Hotel	late C16/early 17th century	24 April 1951	SP7078305837; 51°44′48″N 0°58′34″W	1047908	The Swan Hotel More images
91 and 92, High Street	Thame	House	Early 18th century	24 April 1951	SP7053306033; 51°44′55″N 0°58′47″W	1047951	91 and 92, High Street
16 and 16a, Upper High Street	Thame	House	17th century	24 April 1951	SP7084505782; 51°44′47″N 0°58′31″W	1181075	16 and 16a, Upper High Street More images
Church of St Lawrence	Toot Baldon	parish church	Late 12th century	18 July 1963	SP5676800255; 51°41′53″N 1°10′48″W	1193957	Church of St Lawrence More images
The Manor House	Toot Baldon	Manor House	Early 17th century	18 July 1963	SP5667900796; 51°42′11″N 1°10′52″W	1047998	Upload Photo
6, St Mary's Street (previously Bala Racing Limited)	Wallingford	House, former inn	Mid 16th century	9 December 1949	SU6075889448; 51°36′02″N 1°07′27″W	1048511	Upload Photo
Castle Priory College	Wallingford	House/College	Early 18th century	9 December 1949	SU6089689270; 51°35′56″N 1°07′20″W	1048482	Upload Photo
Church of St Leonard	Wallingford	parish church	11th century	9 December 1949	SU6084689078; 51°35′50″N 1°07′23″W	1048505	Church of St Leonard More images
Church of St Mary Le More	Wallingford	parish church	c. 1653	9 December 1949	SU6071289327; 51°35′58″N 1°07′29″W	1182404	Church of St Mary Le More More images
Church of St Peter	Wallingford	parish church	1763	9 December 1949	SU6093489458; 51°36′02″N 1°07′18″W	1182891	Church of St Peter More images
Friends' Meeting House	Wallingford	Friends Meeting House	c. 1724	9 February 1988	SU6070389624; 51°36′08″N 1°07′30″W	1059622	Friends' Meeting House More images
St Lucian's and attached Former Maltings St Lucian's Lower Wharf	Wallingford, South Oxfordshire	House	Mid 16th century	9 December 1949	SU6084689025; 51°35′48″N 1°07′23″W	1048497	St Lucian's and attached Former Maltings St Lucian's Lower Wharf More images
St Michael's House	Wallingford	Apartment	Late 17th century	9 December 1949	SU6089989511; 51°36′04″N 1°07′20″W	1182176	Upload Photo
The George Hotel	Wallingford	Coaching Inn	Mid 16th century	9 December 1949	SU6077289509; 51°36′04″N 1°07′26″W	1284711	The George Hotel More images
Wallingford Bridge	Wallingford	Bridge	c. 1830	9 December 1949	SU6100389468; 51°36′03″N 1°07′14″W	1368917	Wallingford Bridge More images
17, 18 and 19 High Street	Wallingford	Row	Early 16th century	9 December 1949	SU6082489488; 51°36′03″N 1°07′24″W	1048494	17, 18 and 19 High Street More images
Shillingford Bridge	Shillingford, Warborough	Bridge	1826-27	18 July 1963	SU5966892097; 51°37′28″N 1°08′22″W	1180968	Shillingford Bridge More images
Bridge House	Shillingford, Warborough	House	Early 18th century	14 May 1986	SU5967792232; 51°37′33″N 1°08′21″W	1047817	Upload Photo
Church of St Laurence	Warborough	parish church	Early 13th century	18 July 1963	SU5990393642; 51°38′18″N 1°08′09″W	1181123	Church of St Laurence More images
The Manor House	Warborough	Manor House	1696	18 July 1963	SU6004293496; 51°38′13″N 1°08′02″W	1181422	The Manor House More images
The Old Vicarage	Warborough	Vicarage	Early 18th century	18 July 1963	SU5989893712; 51°38′21″N 1°08′09″W	1048082	Upload Photo
Waterperry House and attached Wall	Waterperry with Thomley	Country House	Late 17th century	18 July 1963	SP6293506286; 51°45′06″N 1°05′23″W	1369255	Waterperry House and attached Wall More images
Church of St Leonard	Waterstock	parish church	Late 15th century	5 June 1985	SP6356005578; 51°44′43″N 1°04′51″W	1284314	Church of St Leonard More images
Orchard End	Waterstock	Cruck House	Late C13/C14	5 June 1985	SP6381405694; 51°44′47″N 1°04′38″W	1047555	Upload Photo
Church of St Leonard	Watlington	parish church	12th century	18 July 1963	SU6848694757; 51°38′51″N 1°00′42″W	1059424	Church of St Leonard More images
East End House	Watlington	House	Early 18th century	18 July 1963	SU6911794627; 51°38′46″N 1°00′09″W	1369016	Upload Photo
Town Hall	Watlington	Town Hall	1665	18 July 1963	SU6897294491; 51°38′42″N 1°00′17″W	1369012	Town Hall More images
Watlington Park	Watlington	Country House	c. 1755	18 July 1963	SU7062792550; 51°37′38″N 0°58′52″W	1059422	Upload Photo
Grove Farmhouse	West Hagbourne	Farmhouse	Mid 17th century	9 April 1952	SU5169487804; 51°35′12″N 1°15′19″W	1181401	Upload Photo
Wheatfield Park Coach House, Stables and Farmhouse	Wheatfield	Farmhouse	post 1814	18 July 1963	SU6871399244; 51°41′16″N 1°00′27″W	1059673	Wheatfield Park Coach House, Stables and Farmhouse More images
Church of St Mary	Wheatley	parish church	1855-7	18 July 1963	SP5969605790; 51°44′51″N 1°08′12″W	1284661	Church of St Mary More images
Manor House	Wheatley	Manor House	16th century	18 July 1963	SP5938905781; 51°44′51″N 1°08′28″W	1047452	Upload Photo
Rectory House	Wheatley	Apartment	1963	18 July 1963	SP5999005527; 51°44′43″N 1°07′57″W	1369281	Upload Photo
Church of St Mary	Whitchurch-on-Thames	parish church	15th century	9 February 1959	SU6349076974; 51°29′17″N 1°05′13″W	1059494	Church of St Mary More images
The Oratory School	Woodcote	Country House	Early 18th century	16 August 1985	SU6541081891; 51°31′56″N 1°03′30″W	1059497	The Oratory School More images
Manor House	Woodeaton	Manor House	c. 1790	18 July 1963	SP5338011986; 51°48′14″N 1°13′38″W	1369224	Manor House More images
