= The Old Bell, Henley on Thames =

The Old Bell
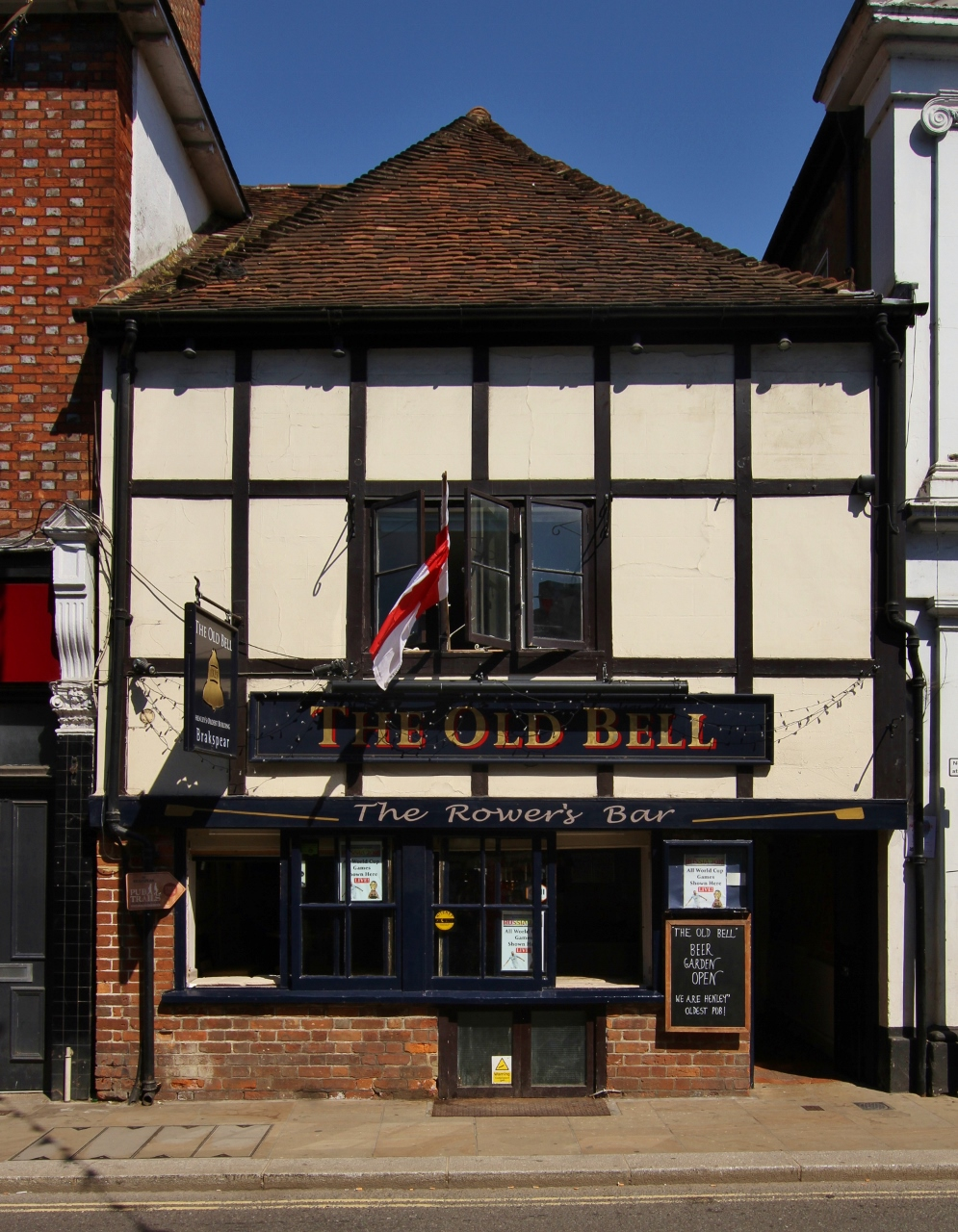
- The Old Bell
- Interactive map of the The Old Bell area
- Former names: La Campana, The Bell Bar and Lounge, The Duke of Cumberland.
- Alternative names: Old Bell

General information
- Type: Pub
- Architectural style: Medieval vernacular
- Location: 20 Bell Street, Henley-on-Thames, England
- Coordinates: 51.53854°N 0.904551°W
- Landlord: Claire Wakefield

Technical details
- Material: timber frame

Listed Building – Grade II*
- Official name: The Old Bell
- Designated: 28 October 1974
- Reference no.: 1369482

Website
- brakspear.co.uk/pub-finder/old-bell/

The Old Bell is a pub in Henley-on-Thames, Oxfordshire. It was built in 1325 and is the oldest building in Henley. It is a Grade II* listed building.

== History ==
The building has a timber frame, with a crown post which dendrochronology has dated to 1325. It was built probably as a wing of a large town house.

In the 1760s it was converted into a pub called The Duke of Cumberland.

It is currently controlled by Brakspear Brewery.

== See also ==
- Old Bell, a list of other pubs with this name
