= Rupert House School =

School in Henley-on-Thames, Oxfordshire, England

Location
- 90 Bell Street; Henley-on-Thames, Oxfordshire, RG9 2BN; England; 51.540571°N 0.904233°W

Information
- Type: Independent preparatory school
- Religious affiliation: None
- Established: 1924
- Local authority: Oxfordshire County Council
- Head teacher: N.A. Armitage
- Gender: Girls and boys
- Age: 3 to 11
- Enrolment: 160
- Colours: Blue, white, and yellow
- Website: www.ruperthouse.org

Rupert House School is an independent pre-prep and preparatory school located in Henley-on-Thames, Oxfordshire, England.

Rupert House School was established in 1924 with ten pupils and was originally called St Joan's School. It was renamed after Prince Rupert of the Rhine when it moved from New Street to its present location in Bell Street. It has gradually expanded. The school takes girls and boys from age 3 to 11.

At the end of the 20th century, the playing fields on the Fairmile were added to the school's estate. In 2018, a new all-weather pitch was opened by the hockey player Jo Ellis. The 1992 Olympic hockey medallist Mandy Nicholson is the Director of Sport.

The school has been successful in its pupils winning prizes in competitions. It also participates in the junior proms at the Henley Youth Festival.

Alumni of the school include Tina Brown, the editor of the United States edition of Tatler magazine.
