= Henley Town Hall =

Municipal building in Henley, Oxfordshire, England

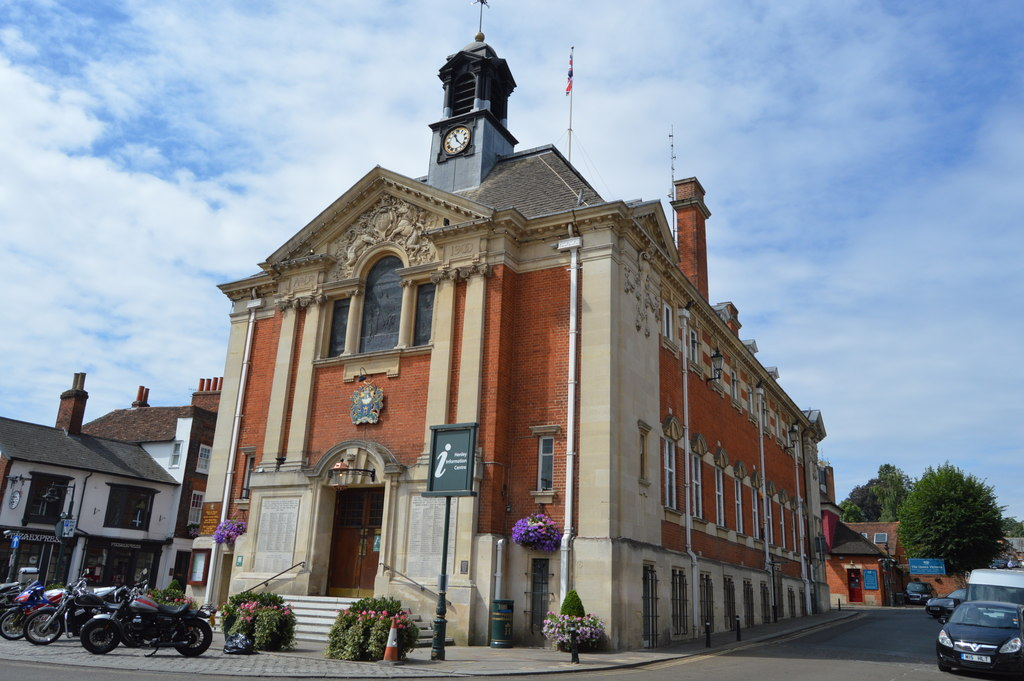
- Henley Town Hall

- Shown in Oxfordshire
- 51.5374°N 0.9063°W
- Location: Market Square, Henley-on-Thames

History
- Built: 1901

Site notes
- Architect: Henry Hare
- Architectural style: Baroque style

Listed Building – Grade II*
- Official name: Town Hall
- Designated: 25 January 1951
- Reference no.: 1047802

Henley Town Hall is a municipal structure in the Market Place in Henley-on-Thames, Oxfordshire, England. The town hall, which is the headquarters of Henley Town Council, is a Grade II* listed building.

== History ==
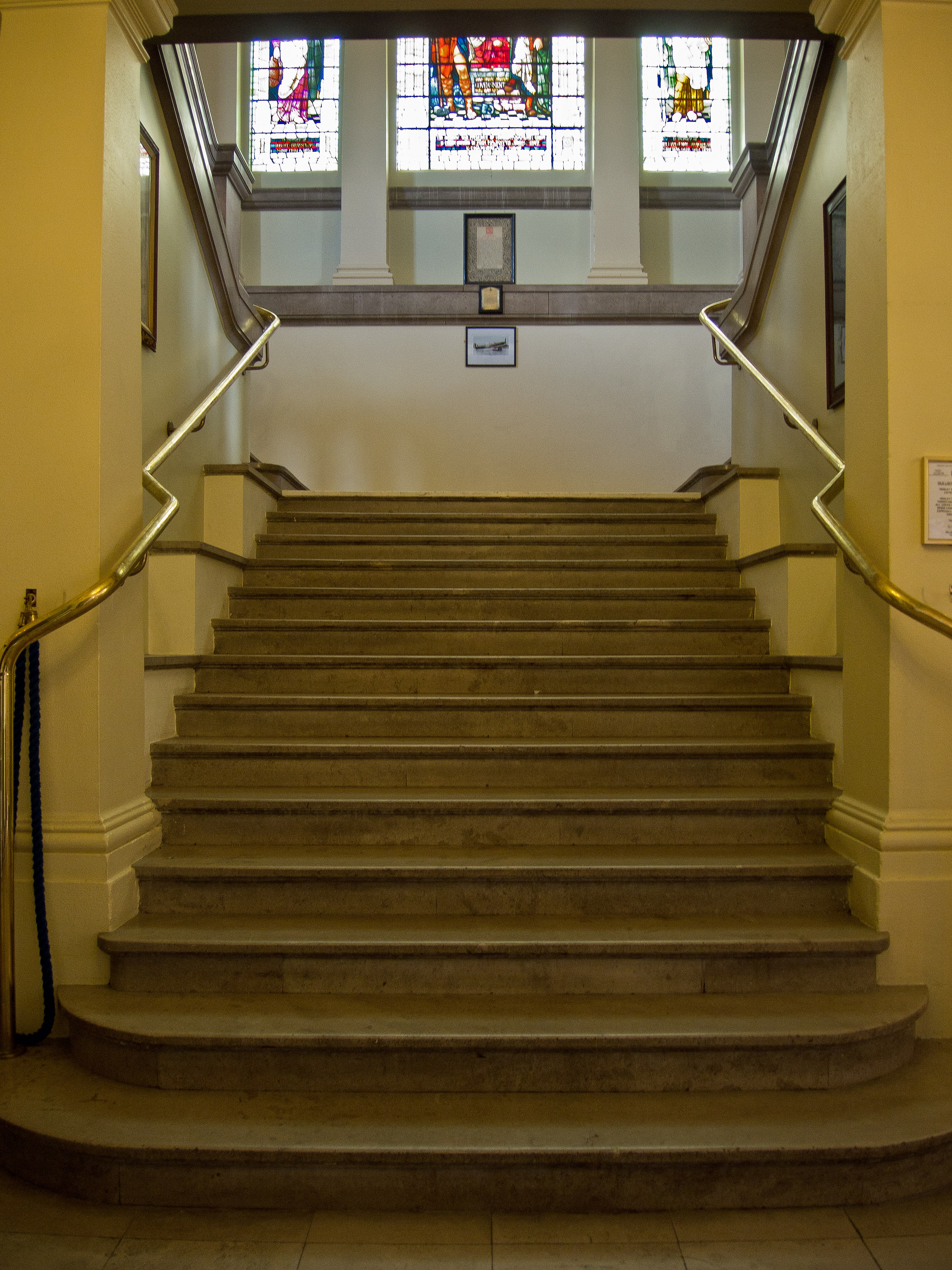
The main staircase

The first municipal building in the town was a medieval guildhall on the south side of Hart Street which was completed in the late 13th century. This was replaced by a second structure in 1492: this building, which was a timber-framed building in the Middle Row of the Market Place just to the west of the junction with Bell Street and Duke Street, was arcaded on the ground floor, so that markets could be held, and it had an assembly room on the first floor.

A third and more substantial town hall was designed in the neoclassical style by local architect, Henry Bradshaw, with some ideas from Field Marshal Henry Conway: the building, which featured a full-height portico, was built in red brick on a site to the west of the second town hall. It was also arcaded on the ground floor with an assembly room on the first floor and was completed in December 1796. There was a village lock-up for petty criminals in the basement. The town hall became the regular venue for the draw to determine qualifying teams for the annual Henley Royal Regatta when the event first took place in summer 1839. Its borough council, which had met in the assembly room, was reformed under the Municipal Corporations Act 1883.

In the late 19th century, after the previous town hall was deemed too small, civic leaders decided to demolish it and build a fourth structure on the same site as the third one, as a lasting memorial to Queen Victoria's Diamond Jubilee. The new building was designed by Henry Hare in the Baroque style, built in red brick with stone dressings by Messrs. McCarthy E. Fitt of Reading at a cost of £5,895 and was officially opened by the local member of parliament, Robert Hermon-Hodge, on 13 March 1901.

The design involved a symmetrical main frontage facing east onto the Market Square; the central section, which slightly projected forward, featured a short flight of steps leading up to a doorway with an arched stone surround. There was a Venetian window on the first floor flanked by two pairs of Ionic order pilasters supporting an architrave and a large pediment with a carved coat of arms in the tympanum. At roof level there was a cupola with a gold ball and a weather vane. Internally, the principal rooms were the council chamber on the ground floor and the main hall on the first floor. The ground floor contained an additional pair of large formal rooms, one of which served as the Mayor's Parlour, the other as a committee room. The basement storey was largely taken up by a drill hall, and also contained office rooms for the Town Clerk, Borough Surveyor and other council officials. The original iron gates to the building were replaced by wooden doors in 1909; the gates were given to Holy Trinity Church.

During the First World War, the town hall was used as a Red Cross Voluntary Aid Detachment auxiliary hospital. Tablets commemorating the lives of service personnel who had died in the First World War were erected on either side of the main doorway in the early 1920s. Additional names were added at the bottom of the tablets after the Second World War. The town hall continued to serve as the headquarters of Henley-on-Thames Borough Council for much of the 20th century but ceased to be the local seat of government when the enlarged Wallingford District Council was formed in 1974. The building place subsequently became the meeting place of Henley-on-Thames Town Council.

Works of art in the town hall include a portrait by Godfrey Kneller of King George I, a portrait after Anthony van Dyck of the former Archbishop of Canterbury, William Laud, and a portrait by an unknown artist of the former Lord Chancellor, Thomas Parker, 1st Earl of Macclesfield.

== See also ==
- Grade II* listed buildings in South Oxfordshire
