= Henley Whalers =

Sailing boat enthusiast group

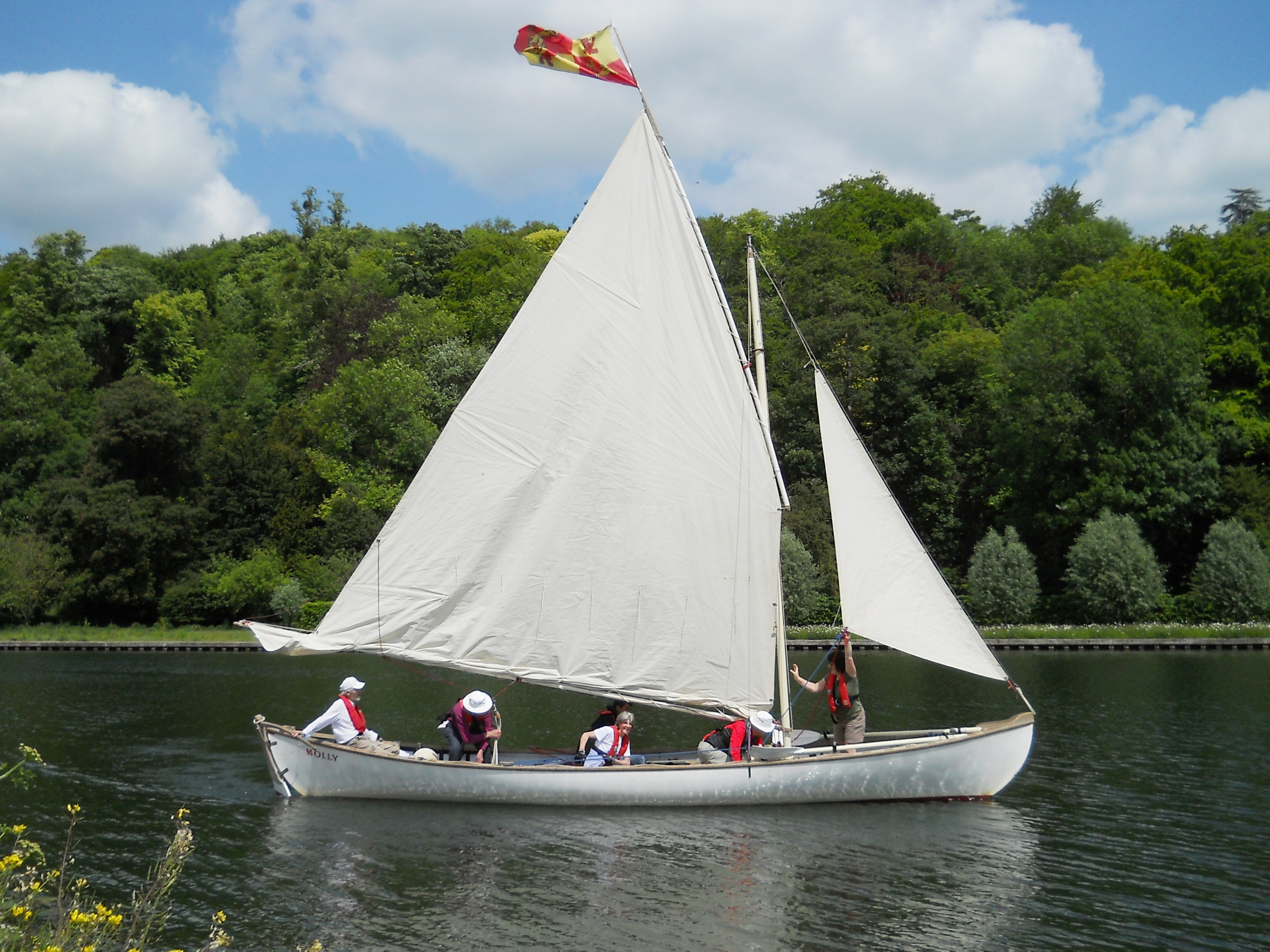
Whale-boat Molly sailing near Henley on Thames, 2011

Established in 1993, Henley Whalers is a group of sailing boat enthusiasts based in Henley on Thames, Oxfordshire, UK.

== Notable events ==
The Henley Whalers have taken part in many events, most notably Queen Elizabeth II's Diamond Jubilee Pageant on the River Thames through London, on June 3, 2012.
Henley Whalers also formed part of the "sail-past" (by invitation) in front of the queen at the pageant at Henley on Thames, June 2013.

They also accompanied the Olympic flame in 2012 from Hampton Court to Putney behind Gloriana, the new royal barge.

Other significant events have included: the Vogalonga, Velalonga and Velalonga Raid in Venice, Italy; The Dorestad Raid in the Netherlands; The Semaine du Golfe du Morbihan in Brittany; and in the UK: The Great River Race, The English Raid, and Sail Caledonia.

Many of these are sail-and-oar events, known as raids.

== Members ==
The Henley Whalers' member-base mainly consists of adults, though younger members are encouraged through various youth events.

== Activities ==
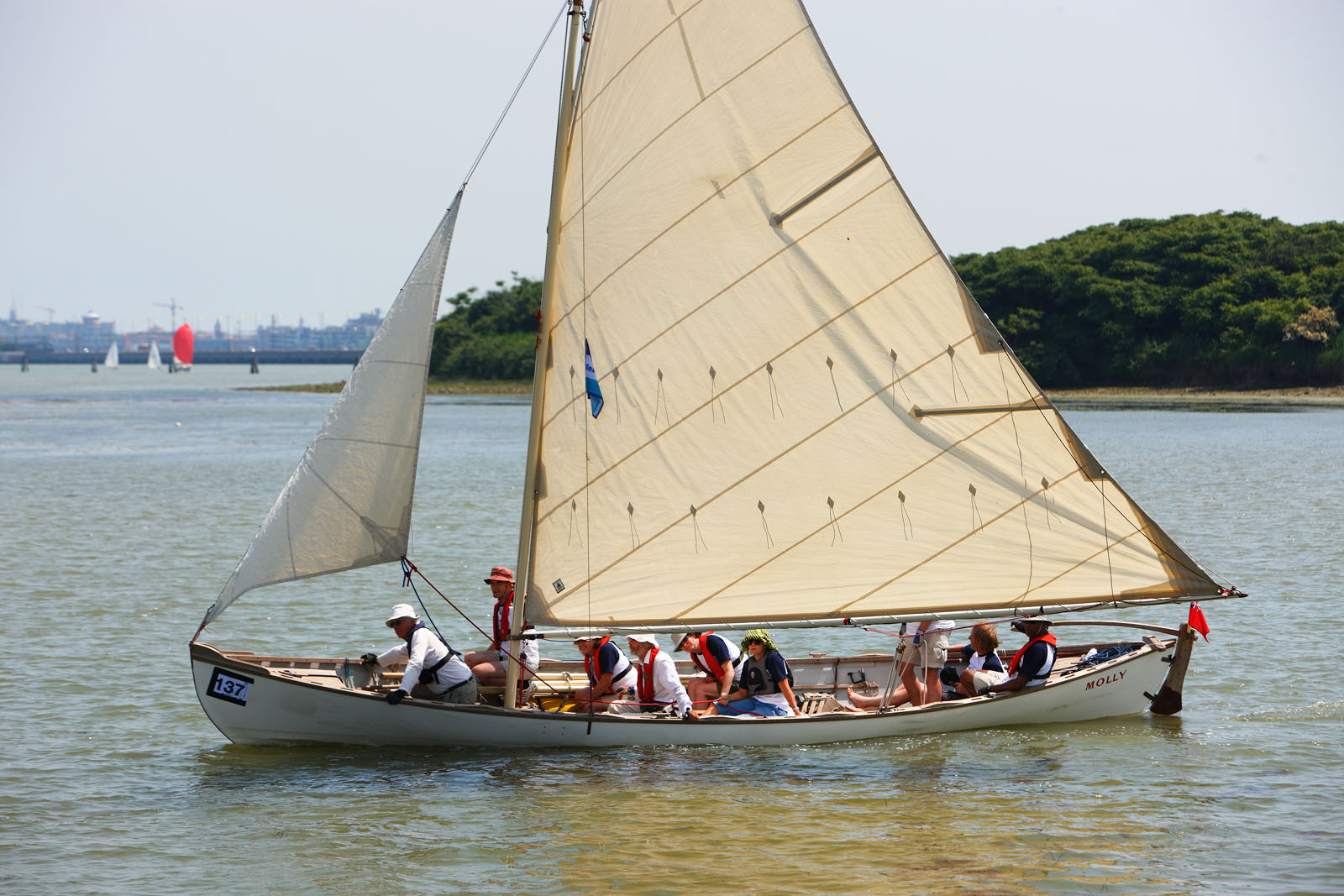

The Henley Whalers enjoy fixed-seat rowing year-round, from their base at Henley on Thames. They also participate in National and International events, rowing and/or sailing, throughout UK and Europe.

== Boats ==
=== Molly ===
Molly is the Henley Whalers main vessel, built in 2003. The Henley Whalers have sailed Molly in various international competitions throughout Europe, gaining many prizes and accolades. The sail rig (seen in the photo) is trapezial boom lug.
Previous boats have included "Collingwood" and "Lutra-Lutra" (both Montague whalers of British Navy type).
