= Raid (boating) =

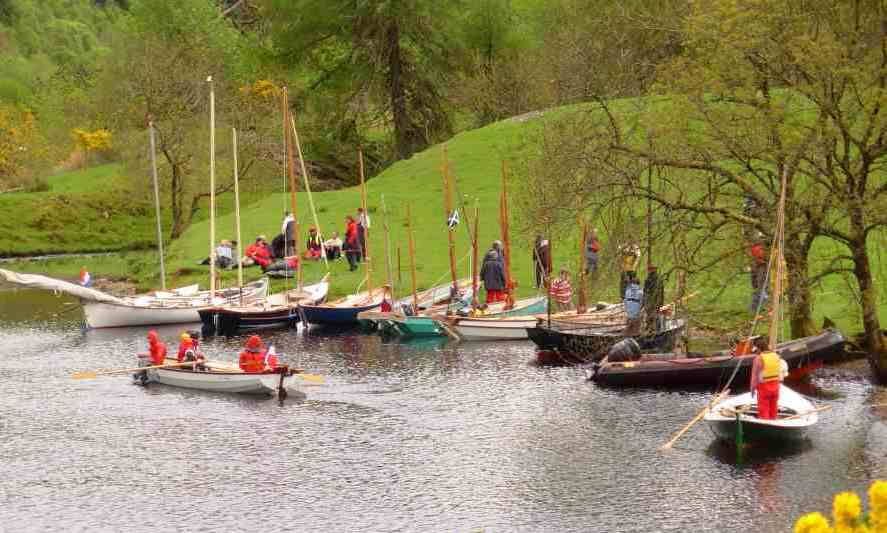
"Raid" boats on the Caledonian Canal, Scotland

Within boating, Raid is described as a sail and oar adventure, a leisure pursuit combining sailing and rowing. It involves a fleet of small boats capable of being rowed and sailed, exploring a coastline or inland waterway over several days, often with some competitive element.
In describing raiding, the organiser of the 2010 & 2011 English Raids states; "The idea of making coastal voyages in company, in open boats powered by sail and oar, was given currency by the French group Albacore, led by Charles-Henri le Moing during the 1990s, starting in Portugal and Scotland... The word raid has slipped into English and lost its usual associations of pillage and destruction – to those who participate at least."

In Australia, RAID Sydney and RAID Port Macquarie began as Facebook groups that adopted the 'raid' concept, but without emphasising the rowing element, many dinghies being fitted with small outboard motors, including electric outboards. Their focus is on day-sailing on local waterways in non-competition-focused gatherings, and on multi-day, overnight camping 'raids', where sailors sleep either aboard or on shore at non-commercial campsites. This model is more akin with that of the 'Dinghy Cruising' fraternity, but less formal, less organised, with events often organically generated. One person posts they intend to visit a certain location at a certain day/time, and others choose to join them. Essentially a group of near-strangers sailing in company, no prizes, no fees and, as the participants insist 'no BS'!

Raiding has become increasingly popular amongst small-boat sailors, and this has fostered the development of raid-worthy boats. Examples of the type include:-
American whaleboat "Molly" crewed by The Henley Whalers.
Morbic 12 and other designs by French Naval architect Francois Vivier.

Raiding is not only an enjoyable outdoor activity, it has been noted to promote family participation.

== Examples ==
Other extant examples of this type of raid include:

- Dorestad Raid
- Raid Finland, established 2002
- Sail Caledonia
- Semaine du Golfe de Morbihan.
- The Vela Raid in Venice
- Shipyard Raid
- Raid Poland (active)
- Croisiere Loire
- Small Reach Regatta
- Tawe Nunnugah, every 2 years since 2007, Tasmania
- Everglades Challenge
- Texas200, since 2008
- Salish 100, since 2019
