= The Swan, Tetsworth =

Building in Tetsworth, Oxfordshire, England

Coordinates: 51°42′38″N 1°00′24″W

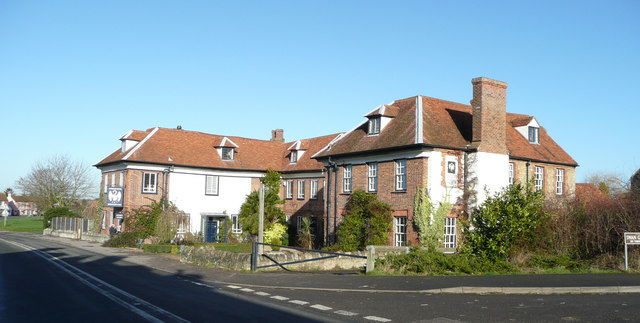
The Swan in 2008.

The Swan is an historic former Grade II* Elizabethan coaching inn in Tetsworth built about 1600 CE with 17th-century and 18th-century additions.

It is now hosts a restaurant and an antiques business.
