= Culham Manor =

Manor house in Oxfordshire, England

Coordinates: 51.6507°N 1.2761°W

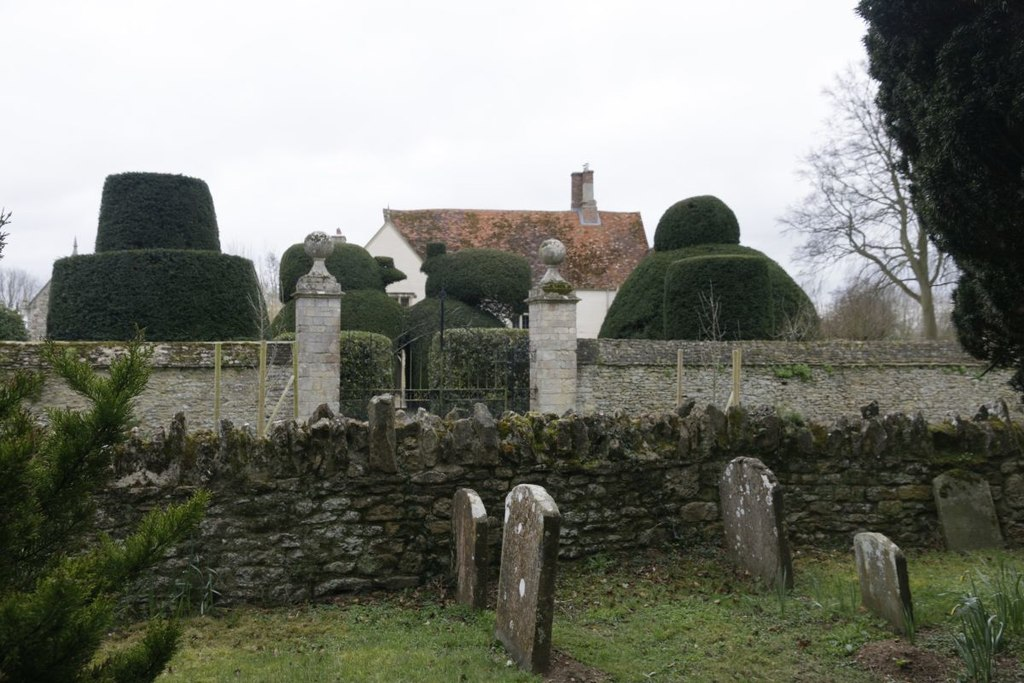
Culham Manor

Culham Manor is a historic manor house in Culham, near Abingdon in southern Oxfordshire, England.

== History ==
Circa 1420 a religious guild financed the building of Abingdon Bridge, and the 'old' bridge at Culham. The Manor House, originally a medieval barn held of the Abbots of Abingdon was also built or rebuilt around this period. It was used as a rest house until the Dissolution of the Monasteries, in 1538

In 1468, a member of the Culham-based family of Marshall was a suspect in a Lancastrian plot. Robin Marshall, "late of Culham", was one of 15 suspects pardoned in July 1468 after dubious revelations by the spy John Cornelius, servant of Sir Robert Whittingham. He was probably the son of “Robert Marchal of Culneham” listed as being from Fetherstonehaugh (Fetherstanhalg) in Northumberland in 1431. After a subsequent trial, John de Vere, 12th Earl of Oxford, was executed.

Leland reported on a visit to Culham that there was previously a 'fortres or pile, lyke a castle in Andersey'.

During the dissolution of Abingdon Abbey in 1545, Culham manor house was seized by Henry VIII and sold to a William Bury, a London wool trader and whose family had been Merchants of the Staple at Calais, in exchange for land in the Isle of Sheppey. Bury's descendants were buried at Culham Church. His male line ended with George Bury in 1662 whose daughter Sarah (1650–80) married Sir Cecil Bishopp, 4th Baronet, of Parham Park, Sussex in 1666.

The Manor House was restored by Sir Esmond Ovey between 1933 and 1948.

In 2003, the house, set in 11 acres (4.5 ha) of grounds, was for sale for GBP 2.5 million.
