= Kidmore House =

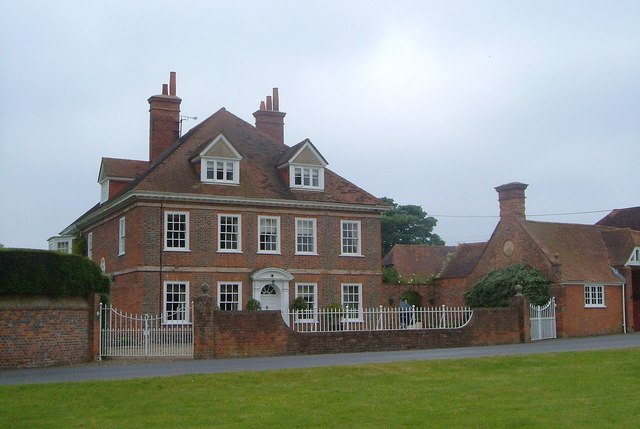
- Interactive map of the Kidmore House area

General information
- Status: Grade II* listed
- Type: English Country House
- Location: Kidmore End, England
- Coordinates: 51.5030°N 0.9866°W
- Estimated completion: 1680

Kidmore House is a Grade II* listed stately home in the village of Kidmore End, in Oxfordshire, England.

It was built in 1680 and is described by Historic England as being "Late C17. Flint base; grey brick with red brick dressings; plain tile roof; brick stacks. 2 storey and attic 5-window range. Central 6-panel door with fanlight and Doric pilaster to each side supporting segmental pediment.12-pane unhorned sashes to all openings. Flat brick band between ground and first floor, and below eaves. Dentil cornice to eaves. 2 gabled dormers. Hipped roof. Internal stacks to left and right return. Interior noted as having contemporary staircase and 3 panelled rooms ... Listed buildings account for about 2% of English building stock. Grade II* buildings are particularly important buildings of more than special interest; 5.5% of listed buildings are Grade II*."

On 29 May 1927 the house and estate were described in The Times as having; "entrance and lounge halls, oak-panelled dining room, two other reception rooms, six principal bed rooms, four maids' rooms, three bath room etc." The "pleasure grounds" of fourteen acres included "spacious lawns with stately trees and parklike meadowland".

== History ==
The history of Kidmore House starts in Norman times, when Walter Giffard, Lord of Longueville, was given the land on which the country house stands after the 1066 conquest. In 1158, his son Walter Giffard, Earl of Buckingham and Ermigardis his wife gave the land to a house of Augustinian friars when they founded the Abbey of Notley in Buckinghamshire. The Giffard's original charter, in Latin, which survives in the Bodleian Library in Oxford, was confirmed by King John I. The Abbey of Notley, together with other land in Caversham, continued with the friars until the dissolution of the Abbey in 1536 by King Henry VIII, who sold the estate and surrounding land to his Chief Disbursing Officer for the Royal Household. Kidmore House was completed in 1680 and was most likely constructed by his descendants.

During mid eighteenth century the house was occupied by Thomas Willats Esq., (1732-1786), High Sheriff of Oxfordshire 1772–1773. His son Rev. Thomas Willats (1762-1831) married Elizabeth Laura Littlehales, a descendant of James II. The Rector inherited the house and was also made High Sheriff of Oxfordshire in 1792.
