= Shirburn =

Village in Oxfordshire, England

Coordinates: 51.660°N 0.991°W

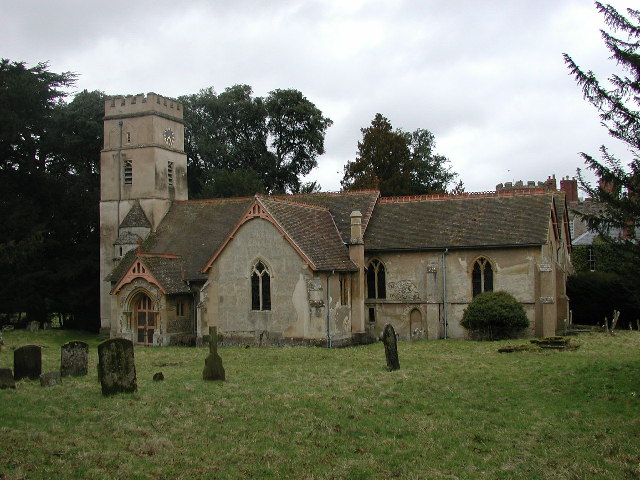
- All Saints' parish church

- Location within Oxfordshire
- Area: 17.68 km^{2} (6.83 sq mi)
- Population: 214 (2011 census including Adwell and Stoke Talmage civil parishes)
  - Density: 12/km^{2} (31/sq mi)
- OS grid reference: SU6995
- Civil parish: Shirburn
- District: South Oxfordshire
- Shire county: Oxfordshire
- Region: South East
- Country: England
- Sovereign state: United Kingdom
- Post town: WATLINGTON
- Postcode district: OX49
- Dialling code: 01844
- Police: Thames Valley
- Fire: Oxfordshire
- Ambulance: South Central
- UK Parliament: Henley and Thame

Shirburn is a village and civil parish about 6 miles (10 km) south of Thame in Oxfordshire. It contains the Grade I listed, 14th-century Shirburn Castle, along with its surrounding, Grade II listed park, and a parish church, the oldest part of which is from the Norman period. The parish has a high altitude by county standards. Its eastern part is in the Chiltern Hills Area of Outstanding Natural Beauty. Shirburn, the largest civil parish in the district, is forested to the south. A motorway cuts across one edge.

== Manor and castle ==
Shirburn is a spring line settlement at the foot of the Chiltern escarpment. The Domesday Book of 1086 records that the manor of Shirburn was divided equally between Robert D'Oyly and his brother in arms Roger d'Ivry.

The building of Shirburn Castle was licensed in 1377. It was owned by the Chamberlain family for many generations. Shirburn Castle became a centre of Recusancy throughout the 16th and 17th centuries. The castle was renovated and remodelled in the Georgian era by the Thomas Parker, 1st Earl of Macclesfield who made it his family seat, and altered further in the early 19th century; the property is still owned by the Macclesfield family company, although the present (2020) 9th Earl no longer resides there, having been forced by the family company to leave in 2005.

== Parish church ==
Shirburn had a parish church by the 12th century. Between 1146 and 1163 the church seems to have been granted to Dorchester Abbey. The oldest part of today's Church of England parish church of All Saints is the bell tower, which is apparently Norman, except for the 18th-century upper stage. In the 13th century, north and south aisles and arcades were added to the nave.

Thomas Parker, 1st Earl of Macclesfield, Whig politician and Lord Chancellor impeached in 1725, who purchased the castle in 1716 and extensively remodelled it, retired to Shirburn and was buried there after his death in London on 28 April 1732, as were succeeding members of his family.

In 1876 the architect T. H. Wyatt restored the building at the expense of the Earl of Macclesfield. In 1943 All Saints' parish was combined with that of St. Mary's, Pyrton. The combined parish is now part of the Benefice of Icknield. All Saints' Church became redundant in 1995 and now belongs to the Churches Conservation Trust.

== Demography ==
The 2011 Census incorporated its figures for Adwell and Stoke Talmage to the north into an output area, used to equate to an arbitrarily enlarged civil parish definition of Shirburn, due to the former's small population.

== Education ==
The parish school set up by 1808 was said in 1871 to be occupying a converted cottage. In 1946 it became a junior school passing older pupils on to Chinnor. It was closed altogether in 1950.

== Transport ==
In 1869–1872, the Watlington and Princes Risborough Railway was built through the parish with a terminus 0.5 miles (800 m) south of Shirburn in the parish of Watlington. The Great Western Railway took over the line in 1883. British Railways withdrew its passenger services in 1957 and closed the line to freight traffic in 1961.

== Sources ==
- Lobel, Mary D, ed. (1969). A History of the County of Oxford: Volume 8: Lewknor and Pyrton Hundreds. Victoria County History. pp. 178–198.
- Oppitz, Leslie (2000). Lost Railways of the Chilterns. Newbury: Countryside Books. pp. 20–23. ISBN 1-85306-643-5.
- Sherwood, Jennifer; Pevsner, Nikolaus (1974). Oxfordshire. The Buildings of England. Harmondsworth: Penguin Books. pp. 761–763. ISBN 0-14-071045-0.
