= Henley-on-Thames =

Town in Oxfordshire, England

Coordinates: 51.5357°N 0.9030°W

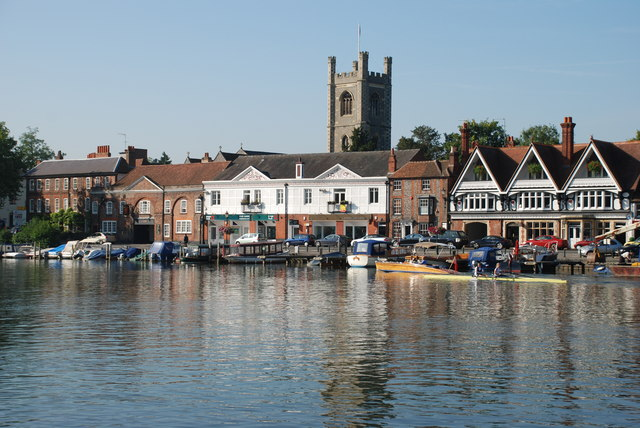
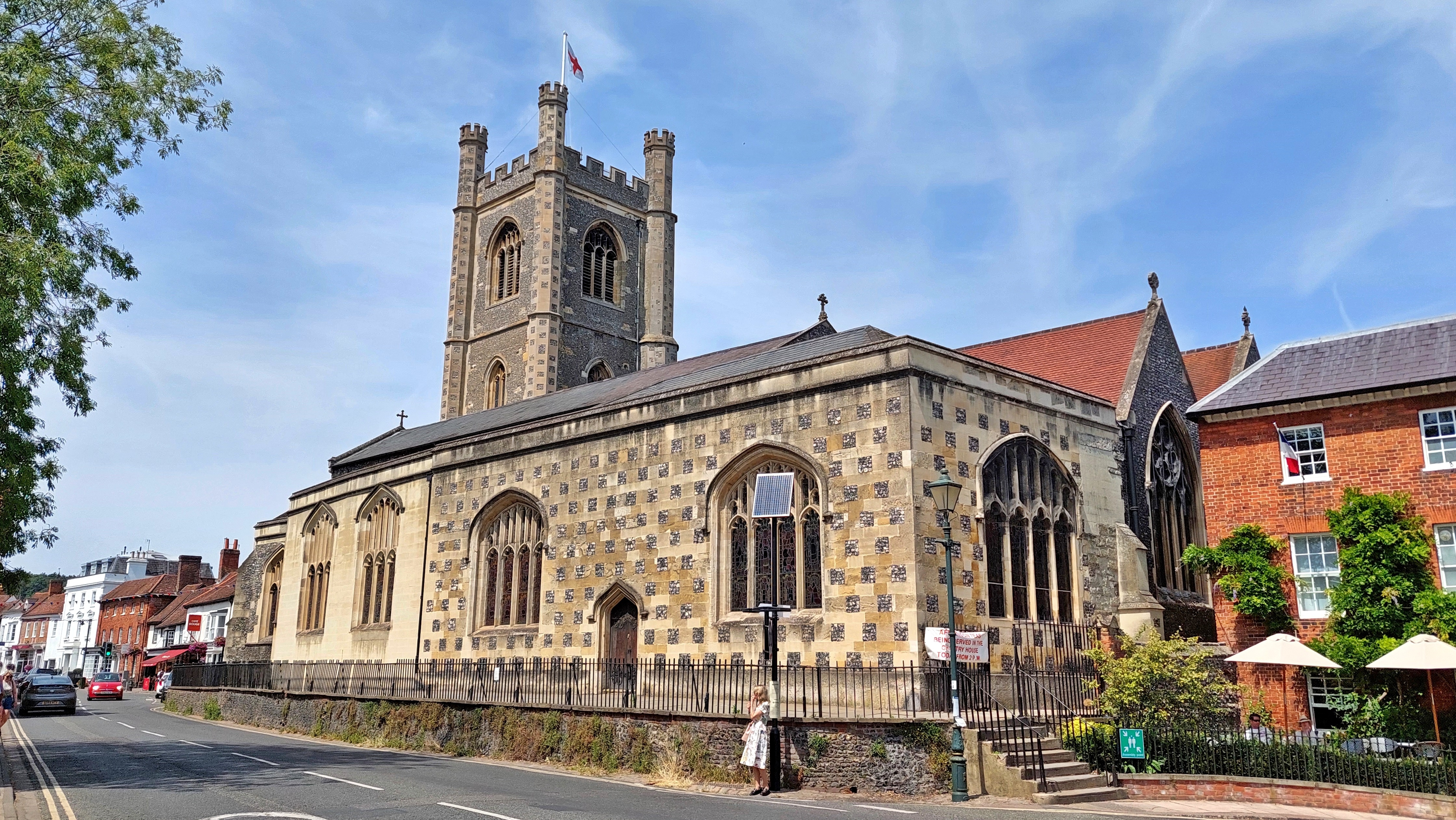
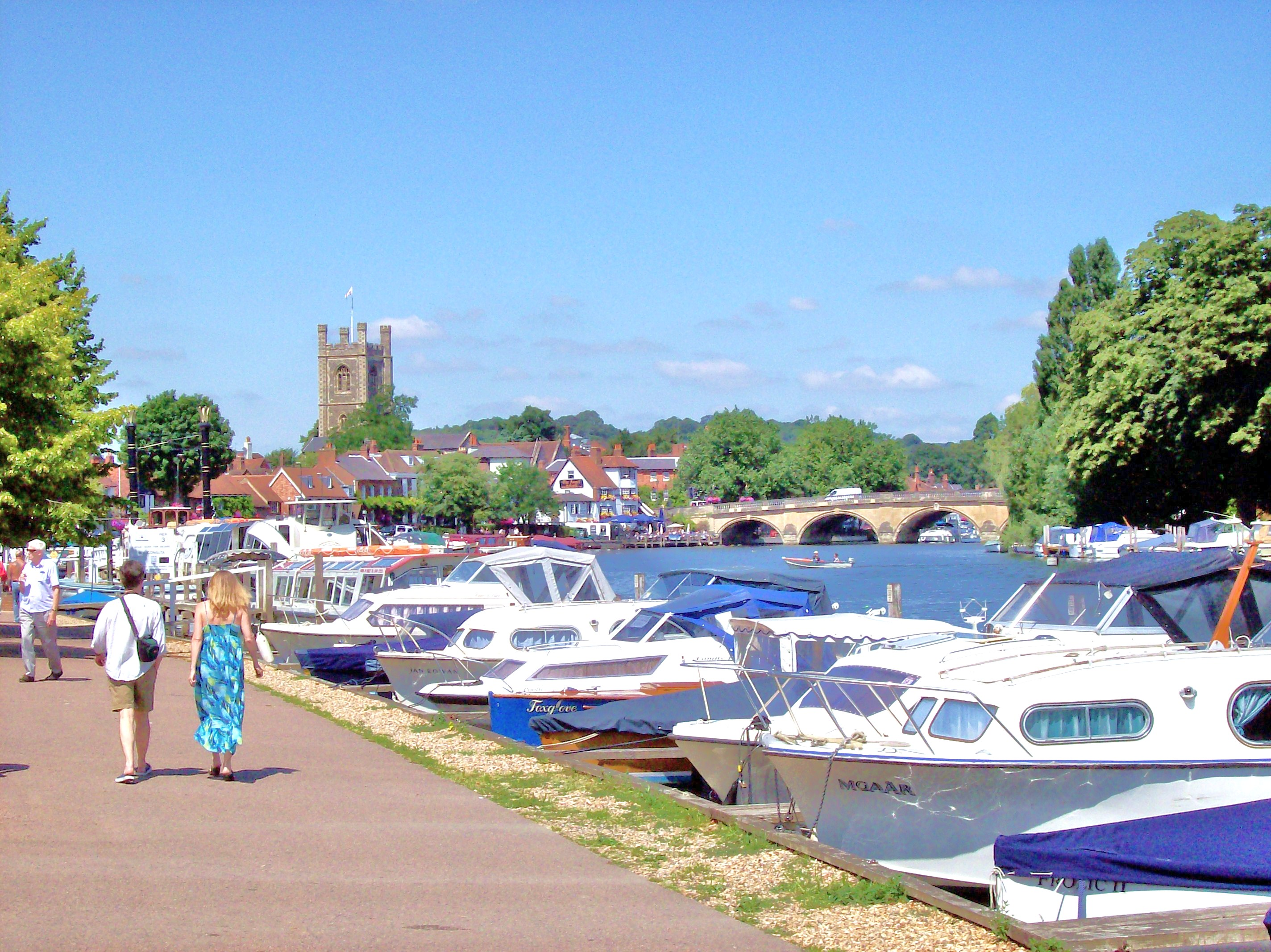
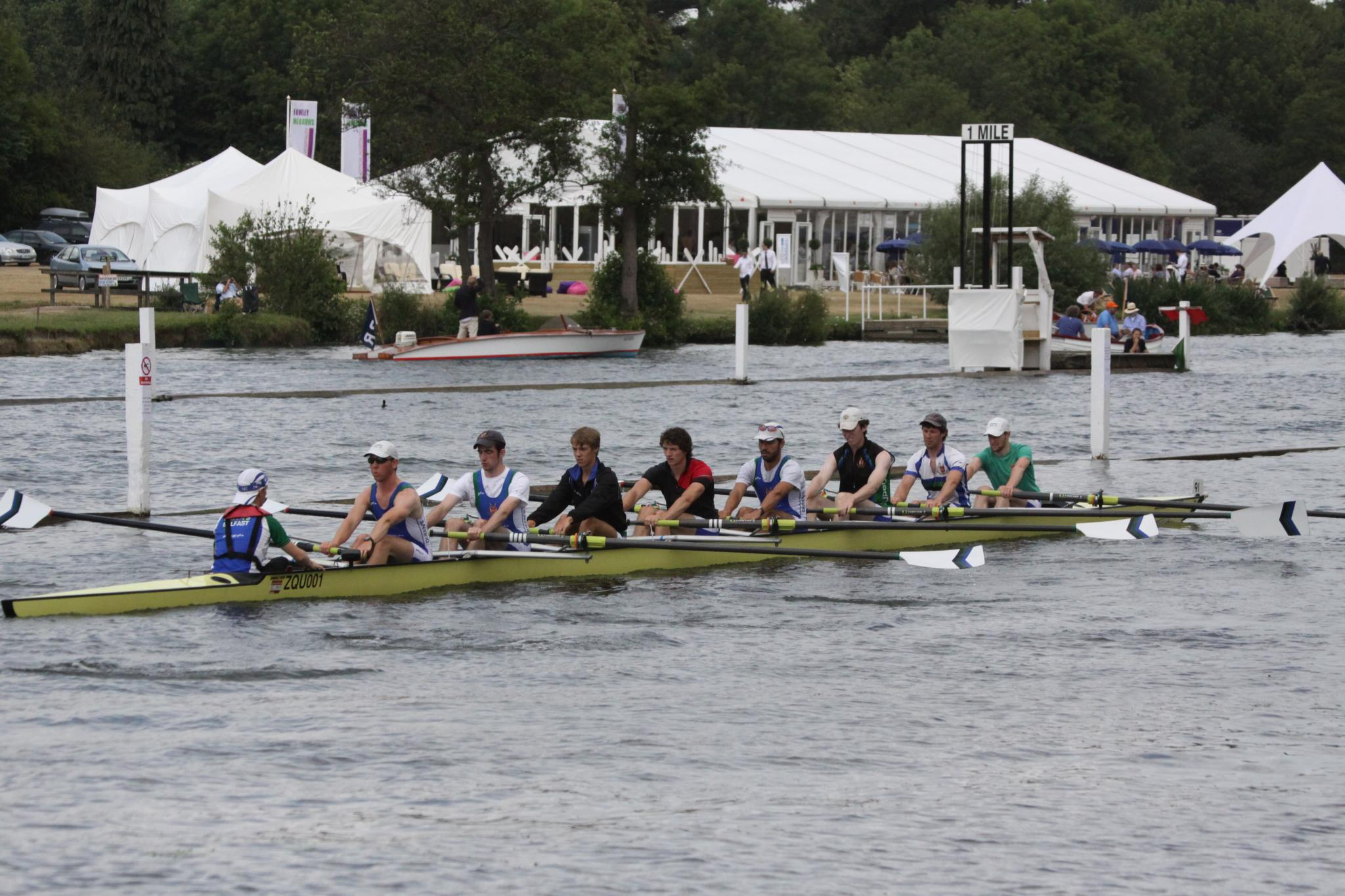
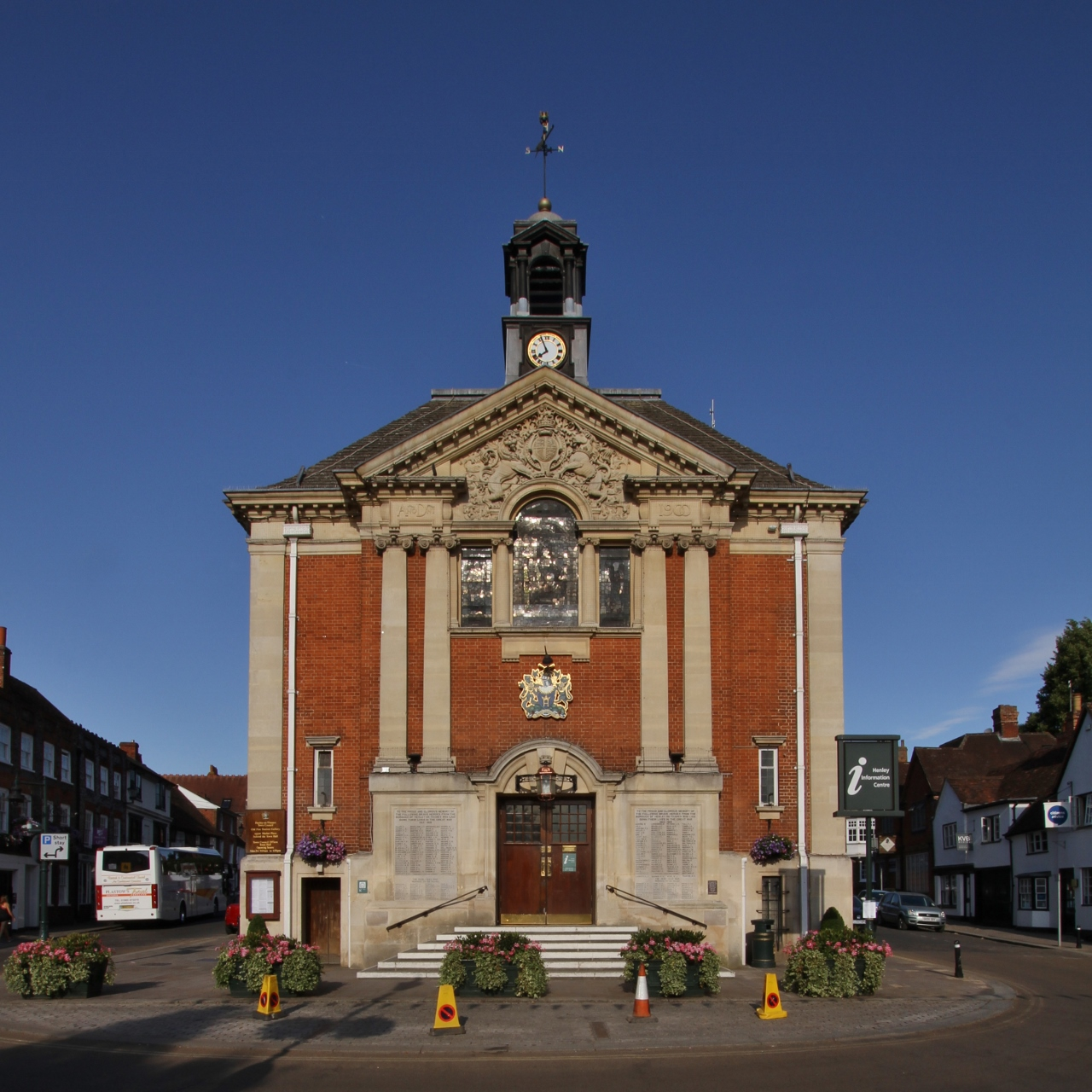
- River Thames St Mary's Church Henley Bridge Henley Royal Regatta Henley Town Hall

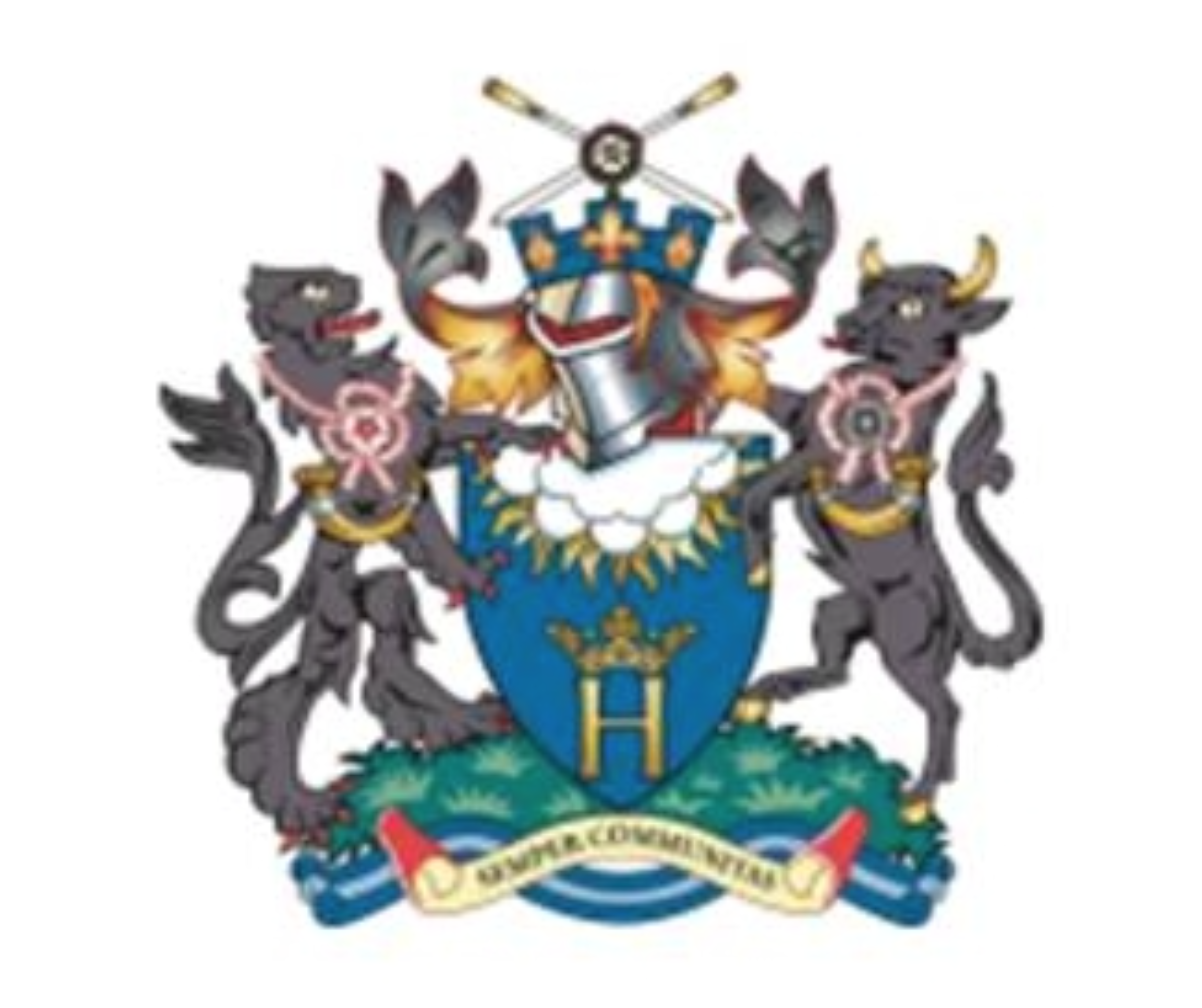
- Coat of Arms

- Location within Oxfordshire
- Area: 5.58 km^{2} (2.15 sq mi)
- Population: 12,186 (2021 Census)
  - Density: 2,184/km^{2} (5,660/sq mi)
- OS grid reference: SU7682
  - London: 33 miles (53 km)
- Civil parish: Henley-on-Thames
- District: South Oxfordshire
- Shire county: Oxfordshire
- Region: South East
- Country: England
- Sovereign state: United Kingdom
- Post town: HENLEY-ON-THAMES
- Postcode district: RG9
- Dialling code: 01491
- Police: Thames Valley
- Fire: Oxfordshire
- Ambulance: South Central
- UK Parliament: Henley and Thame
- Website: Henley-on-Thames Town Council

Henley-on-Thames (/ˌhɛnli-/ HEN-lee) is a town and civil parish on the River Thames, in the South Oxfordshire district, in Oxfordshire, England. The population at the 2021 census was 12,186.

== History ==
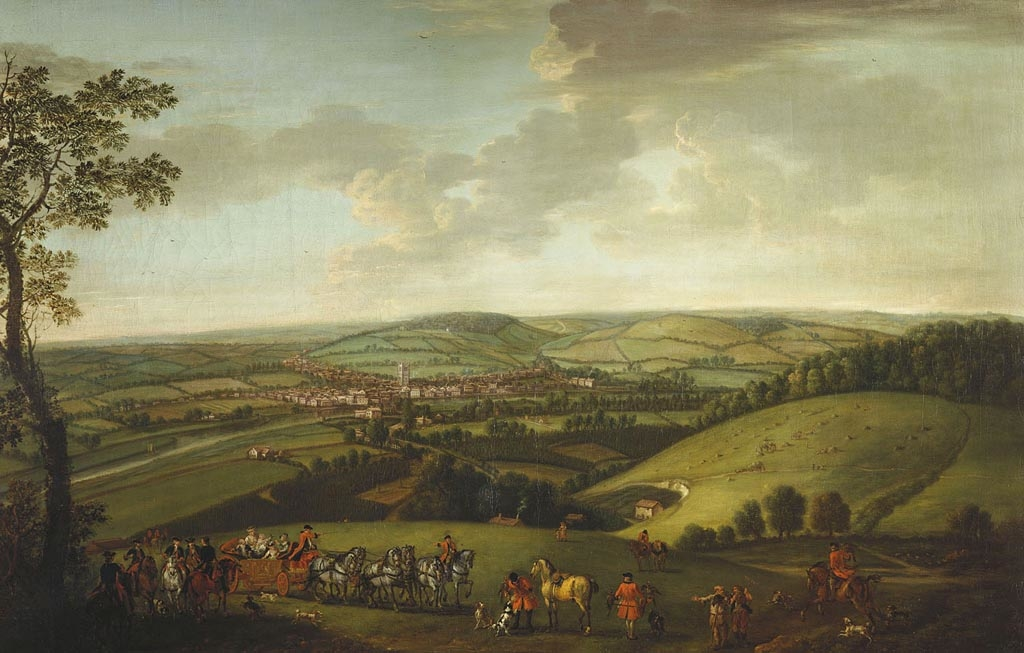
A View of Henley-on-Thames by John Wootton, 1743

The name Henley derives from the Old English hēahlēah meaning 'high wood or clearing'.

There is archaeological evidence of people residing in Henley since the second century as part of the Romano-British period. Henley does not appear in Domesday Book of 1086; often it is mistaken for Henlei in the book which is in Surrey. The first record of Henley as a substantial settlement is from 1179, when it is recorded that King Henry II "had bought land for the making of buildings". King John granted the manor of Benson and the town and manor of Henley to Robert Harcourt in 1199. A church at Henley is first mentioned in 1204. In 1205 the town received a tax for street paving, and in 1234 the bridge is first mentioned. In 1278 Henley is described as a hamlet of Benson with a chapel. The street plan was probably established by the end of the 13th century. As a demesne of the crown it was granted in 1337 to John de Molyns, whose family held it for about 250 years.

The existing Thursday market, it is believed, was granted by a charter of King John. A market was certainly in existence by 1269; however, the jurors of the assize of 1284 said that they did not know by what warrant the Earl of Cornwall held a market and fair in the town of Henley. The existing Corpus Christi fair was granted by a charter of Henry VI. During the Black Death pandemic that swept through England in the 14th century, Henley lost 60% of its population. A variation on its name can be seen as "Henley up a Tamys" in 1485.

By the beginning of the 16th century, the town extended along the west bank of the Thames from Friday Street in the south to the Manor, now Phyllis Court, in the north and took in Hart Street and New Street. To the west, it included Bell Street and the Market Place.

Henley suffered at the hands of both parties in the Civil War. Later, William III rested here on his march to London in 1688, at the nearby recently rebuilt Fawley Court, and received a deputation from the Lords. The town's period of prosperity in the 17th and 18th centuries was due to manufactures of glass and malt, and trade in corn and wool. Henley-on-Thames supplied London with timber and grain. A workhouse to accommodate 150 people was built at West Hill in Henley in 1790, and was later enlarged to accommodate 250 as the Henley Poor Law Union workhouse.

== Governance ==
There are three tiers of local government covering Henley, at civil parish (town), district, and county level: Henley-on-Thames Town Council, South Oxfordshire District Council, and Oxfordshire County Council. The town council is based at Henley Town Hall in the Market Place.

=== Administrative history ===
Henley-on-Thames was an ancient parish. The town was also an ancient borough from the middle ages. Its date of becoming a borough is not known; it appears to have been a seigneurial borough under the control of the lord of the manor, who allowed the town's merchant guild to effectively run the town. The town's first municipal charter was granted in 1568 by Elizabeth I.

The borough was left unreformed when most boroughs across the country were standardised under the Municipal Corporations Act 1835. Government commissioners had concluded that Henley's corporation had too few functions and the town was too small to justify the cost of reform. The old borough corporation continued to exist, but did not qualify for any subsequent new local government powers. In order to provide more modern forms of local government, notably including the provision of sewers, a separate local government district with an elected local board had to be set up in 1864. The local board then operated alongside the unreformed borough corporation until 1883, when the borough was eventually reformed to become a municipal borough. The reformed borough corporation (also known as the town council) took on the abolished local board's functions.

The borough of Henley-on-Thames was abolished in 1974 under the Local Government Act 1972. District-level functions passed to the new South Oxfordshire District Council. A successor parish called Henley-on-Thames was created covering the area of the abolished borough, with its parish council taking the name Henley-on-Thames Town Council.

== Landmarks and structures ==
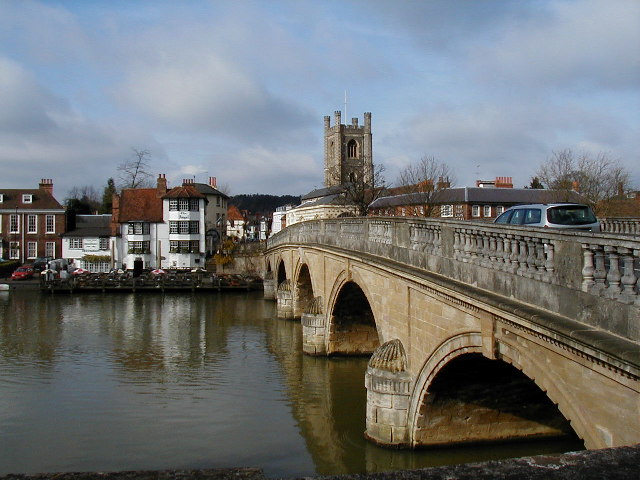
Henley Bridge over the River Thames

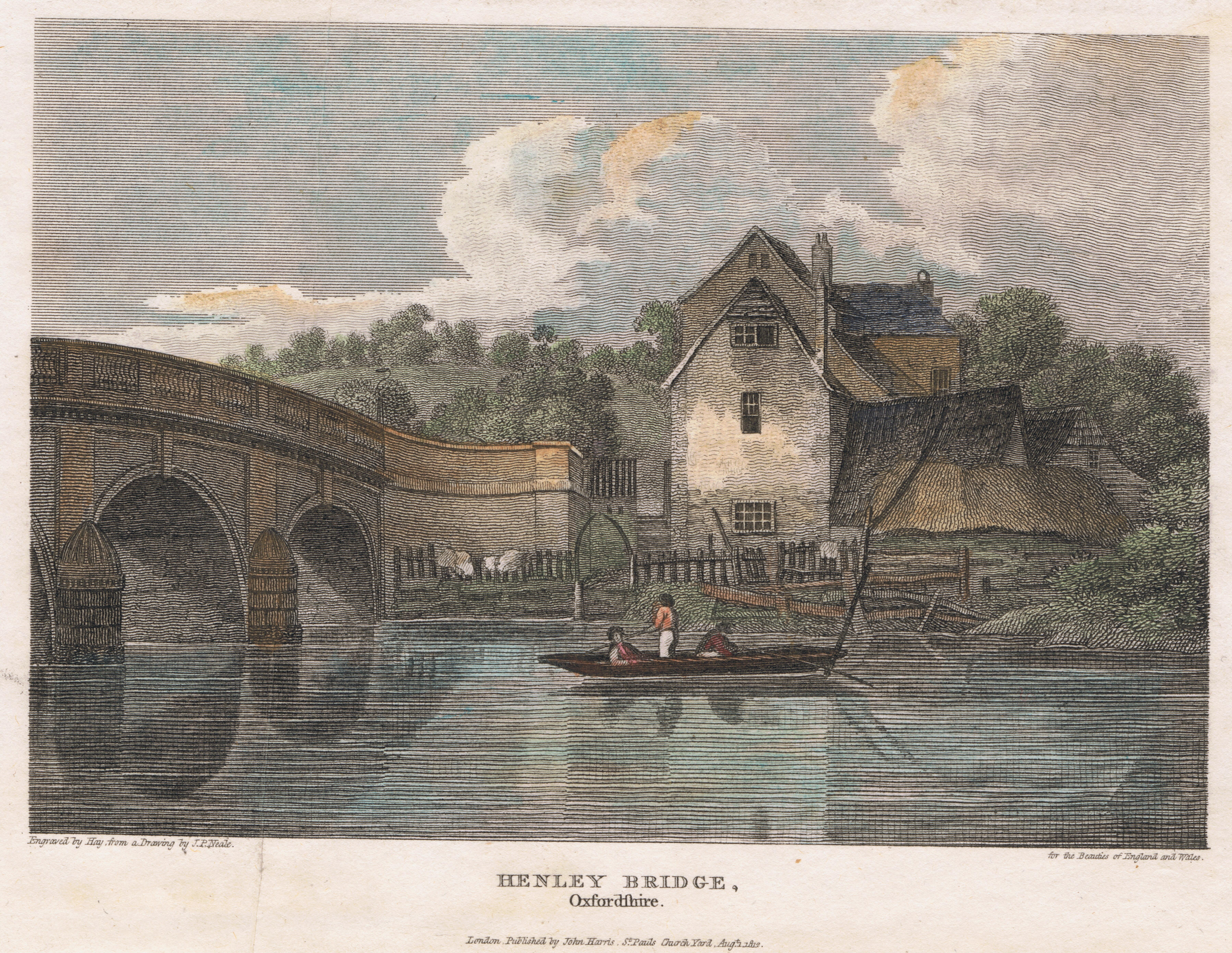
Henley Bridge, engraved in 1812 from a drawing by J. P. Neale, and published in The Beauties of England and Wales

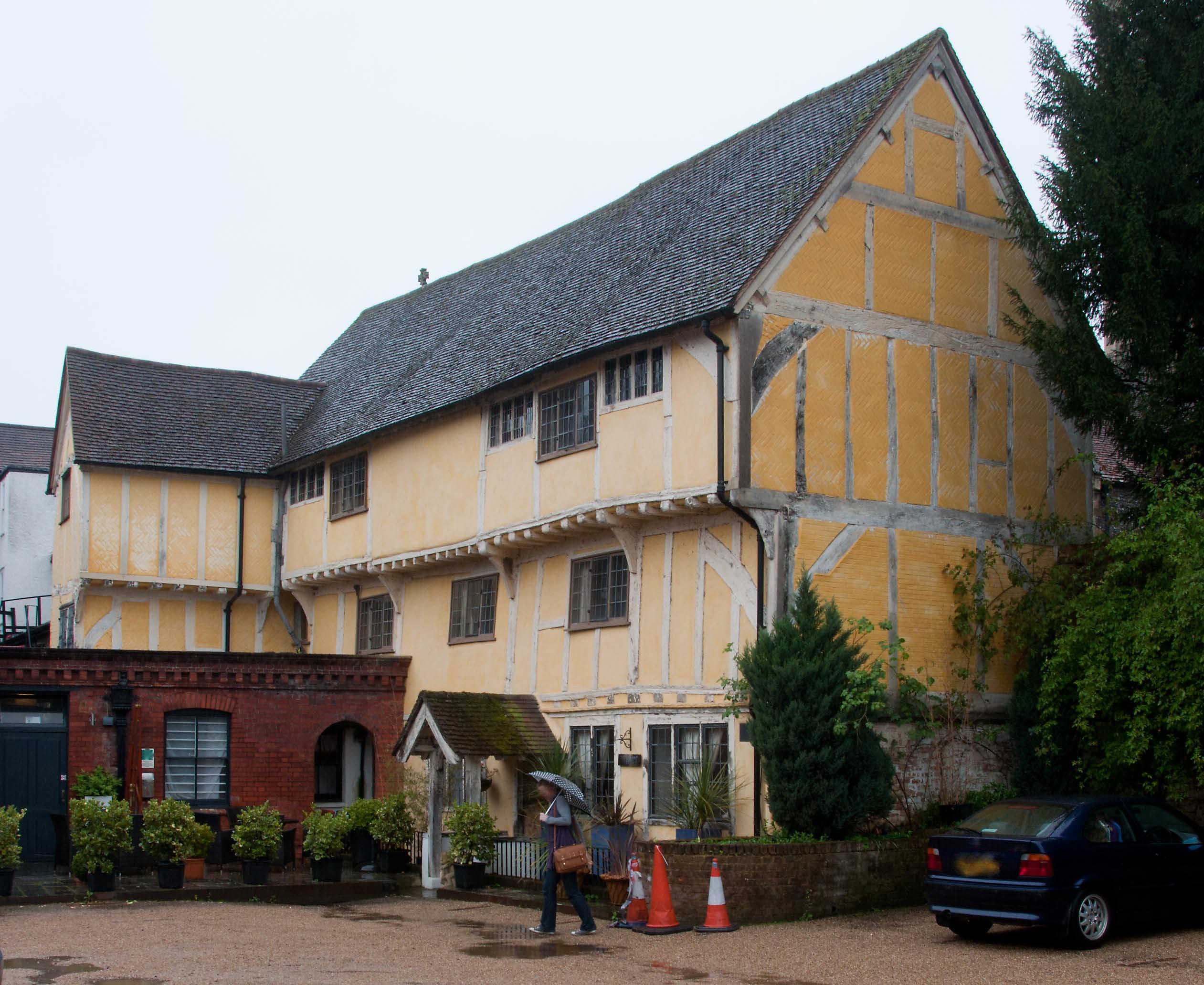
Chantry House, next to the church

Henley Bridge is a five arched bridge across the river built in 1786. It is a Grade I listed historic structure. During 2011 the bridge underwent a £200,000 repair programme after being hit by the boat Crazy Love in August 2010. About 1 mile (1.5 kilometres) upstream of the bridge is Marsh Lock. Henley Town Hall, which occupies a prominent position in the Market Place, was designed by Henry Hare and completed in 1900. Chantry House is the second Grade I listed building in the town. It is unusual in having more storeys on one side than on the other. The Church of England parish church of St Mary the Virgin is nearby and has a 16th-century tower. The Old Bell is a pub in the centre of Henley on Bell Street. The building has been dated from 1325: the oldest-dated building in the town. To celebrate Queen Victoria's Diamond Jubilee, 60 oak trees were planted in the shape of a Victoria Cross near Fairmile, the long straight road to the northwest of the town. Two notable buildings just outside Henley, in Buckinghamshire, are:

- Fawley Court, a red-brick building designed by Christopher Wren for William Freeman (1684) with subsequent interior remodelling by James Wyatt and landscaping by Lancelot "Capability" Brown.
- Greenlands, which took its present form when owned by W. H. Smith and is now home to Henley Business School

== Transport ==
The town's railway station is the terminus of the Henley Branch Line from Twyford. In the past, there have been direct services to London Paddington. There are express mainline rail services from Reading (6 miles or 9.7 km) to Paddington. Trains from High Wycombe (12 miles or 19 km) go to London Marylebone. The M4 motorway (junction 8/9) and the M40 motorway (junction 4) are both about (7 miles or 11 km) away.

Bus route 850 is operated by Carousel Buses on a 15 minute frequency between High Wycombe, Marlow and Henley, extending every 30 minutes to Reading via Wargrave and Twyford.

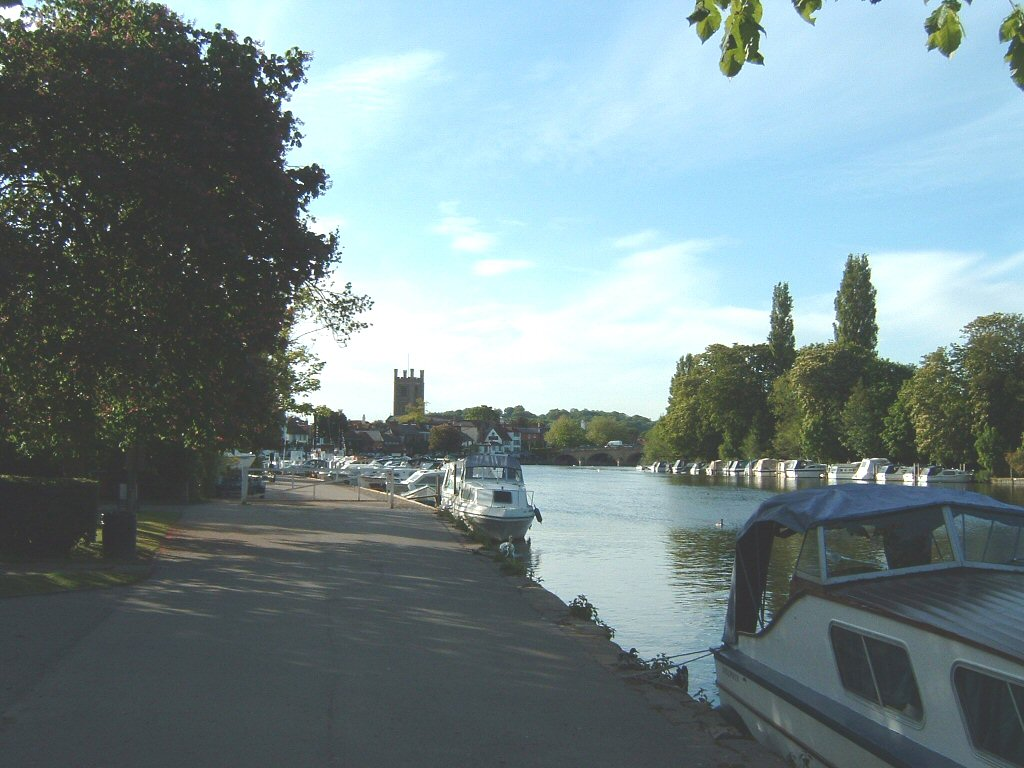
Henley-on-Thames from the playground near the railway station

== Notable businesses ==
Major investment management company Invesco Perpetual is headquartered in Henley.

Engineering company Stuart Turner manufactures domestic pumps in their town-centre factory.

Watchmaker Bremont is based in the town and assembles their watches in their factory on the edge of town.

Organic baby food manufacturer Ella's Kitchen is headquartered in Henley-on-Thames.

== Education ==
=== Primary ===
- Badgemore Primary School, Hop Gardens
- Sacred Heart RC School, Greys Hill
- Trinity CE Primary School, Vicarage Road
- Valley Road Primary School, Valley Road

=== Secondary ===
- Gillotts School, Gillott's Lane

=== Independent ===
- Rupert House School, Bell Street
- St. Mary's Preparatory School, St. Andrews Road
- Shiplake College, is located near Henley in Shiplake

=== Further education ===
- The Henley College
- Henley Business School, which is part of University of Reading is located near Henley

== Rowing ==
Henley is a world-renowned centre for rowing. Each summer the Henley Royal Regatta is held on Henley Reach, a naturally straight stretch of the river just north of the town. It was extended artificially. The event became "Royal" in 1851, when Prince Albert became patron of the regatta. Other regattas and rowing races are held on the same reach, including Henley Women's Regatta, Henley Town and Visitors Regatta, Henley Veteran Regatta, Upper Thames Small Boats Head, Henley Fours and Eights Head, and Henley Sculls. These "Heads" often attract strong crews that have won medals at national championships. Local rowing clubs include:

- Henley Rowing Club (located upstream of Henley Bridge)
- Leander Club (world-famous, home to Olympic and world champions, most notably Steve Redgrave and Matthew Pinsent, near Henley Bridge)
- Phyllis Court Rowing Club (part of the Phyllis Court Club and set up for recreational rowing)
- Upper Thames Rowing Club (located just upstream from the 3/4-mile (1.2-kilometre) mark/Fawley/Old Blades)
- Henley Whalers (associated with UTRC) focus on fixed-seat rowing and sailing.

The regatta depicted in Dead in the Water, an episode of the British detective television series Midsomer Murders, was filmed at Henley.

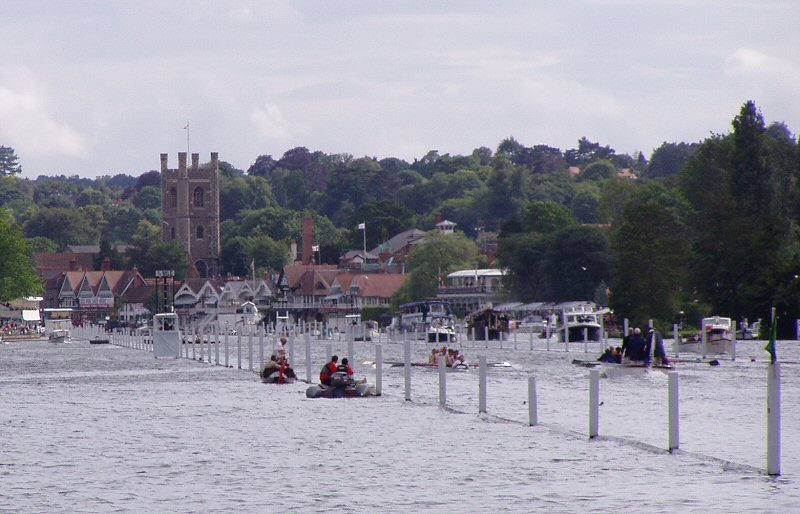
A race during the Henley Royal Regatta

=== River and Rowing Museum ===
The River and Rowing Museum, located in Mill Meadows, was the town's only museum, until it closed in 2025. It was established in 1998, and officially opened by Queen Elizabeth II. The museum, designed by the architect David Chipperfield, featured information on the River Thames, the sport of rowing, and the town of Henley itself. The building houses Henley from the Wargrave Road, a 1698 oil painting by Jan Siberechts, depicting a historic view of the town.

== Other sports ==
Henley has the oldest football team, Henley Town F.C., recognised by the Oxfordshire Football Association, they play at The Triangle ground. Henley also has a rugby union club Henley Hawks which plays at the Dry Leas ground, a hockey club Henley Hockey Club which plays at Jubilee Park, and Henley Cricket Club which has played at Brakspear Ground since 1886. A new club in Henley was started in September 2016 called Henley Lions FC.

== Notable people ==
- Gerry Anderson (1929–2012), creator of Sixties television series Thunderbirds lived in Henley-on-Thames.
- Sir Martyn Arbib led the Perpetual fund management company during the late 20th century, unusually based in Henley-on-Thames, rather than London. Arbib was a major benefactor in the establishment of the River and Rowing Museum at Henley, which opened in 1998.
- Mary Berry, food writer and television presenter, lives in Henley.
- Mary Blandy (1720–1752) lived at Blandy House her family's home in Henley, now a dental surgery. In 1752, she was hanged for the murder, by poisoning, of her father, Francis Blandy who had opposed her engagement to a Scottish man who was already married. She proclaimed on the day of the hanging in Oxford: "Gentlemen, don't hang me high for the sake of decency". Mary is buried with her parents at St Mary The Virgin's Church, despite that being forbidden at the time for a murderer. She is said to haunt the Kenton Theatre, the family house and St Mary's churchyard.
- James Blish (1921–1975), American science fiction writer, lived in Henley from 1969 until his death.
- Jonathan Bowden (1962–2012) lived in Rotherfield Peppard (post town Henley-on-Thames) throughout the 1970s.
- Russell Brand, English comedian, actor and activist, lives in Henley-on-Thames.
- Ross Brawn, British engineer best known for his role as the technical director of the Scuderia Ferrari F1 team and former team principal of Mercedes Grand Prix lives in Stoke Row near Henley-on-Thames.
- Sir Winston Churchill led the Queen's Own Oxfordshire Hussars, (C Squadron) who were based at "The White House" on Market Place in 1908 and some years after that.
- Dame Gladys Cooper (1888–1971), actress, spent her last years in Henley. In an acting career spanning seven decades she appeared on stage (the West End and Broadway), in film, and on television, and was twice nominated for an Academy Award.
- Sir Frank Crisp (1843–1919), first baronet, lawyer and microscopist was the ideator of Friar Park. The "Ballad of Sir Frankie Crisp (Let It Roll)" composed by the former Beatle George Harrison, who purchased Friar Park from Sir Frank, is dedicated to him.
- Esther Copley née Esther Beuzeville (1786–1851) later a writer of children's books and works on domestic economy addressed to the working people, lived here with her parents until her marriage in 1809. There is a plaque to her and her family in the United Reformed Church.
- Charles-François Dumouriez (1739–1823), French general, is buried at St Mary the Virgin parish church.
- John Greville Fennell (1807–1885), painter and angler, lived in Henley and is buried there.
- Humphrey Gainsborough (1718–1776), brother of the artist Thomas Gainsborough, was a pastor and inventor who lived in Henley. A blue plaque marks his house, "The Manse".
- George Harrison (1943–2001), musician and former Beatle, purchased Friar Park in 1970, and lived there until his death. During his years there, he restored the buildings and gardens. His widow, Olivia Harrison, continues to live on the estate. George and Olivia's only child, Dhani Harrison was raised at Friar Park.
- Michael Heseltine, Baron Heseltine of Thenford, preceded Boris Johnson as Conservative MP for Henley-on-Thames.
- Tony Hall, Baron Hall of Birkenhead lives in Henley-on-Thames.
- Sir William Hamilton (1730–1803), British diplomat, antiquarian, archaeologist and vulcanologist was born in Henley-on-Thames.
- John Hunt, Baron Hunt of Fawley (1905–1987) had a house in Henley, where he lived from his retirement until his death.
- Boris Johnson, politician, was the member of parliament and the prime minister of the United Kingdom, as well as the mayor of London.
- Simon Kernick, author, was raised in Henley-on-Thames.
- William Lenthall (1591–1662), politician, was born in Henley-on-Thames. He was Speaker of the House of Commons between 1640 and 1660.
- Sophie Lloyd, virtuoso guitarist and YouTuber, grew up in Henley-on-Thames.
- Toby Marlow, musical theatre composer and actor, co-creator of the musical Six, winner of the Tony Award for Best Original Score in 2022 was raised in Henley.
- Hugo Nicolson, music producer.
- Jack Ogden, jewellery historian, lives in Henley-on-Thames.
- George Orwell (1903–1950), author, spent some of his formative years in Henley-on-Thames.
- Andrew Peach, broadcaster, lives in Henley with his wife and two children.
- Lee Ryan, singer, lives in Henley.
- Marcus du Sautoy, mathematician, lives in Henley.
- Phillip Schofield, TV presenter, lived in Henley with his wife and two daughters.
- Urs Schwarzenbach, financier, lives at Culham Court, Aston, east of Henley.
- Dame Stephanie Shirley (1933-2025), entrepreneur, philanthropist and workplace revolutionary, lived in Henley with her husband.
- Dusty Springfield (1939–1999), singer, is buried in the grounds of St Mary the Virgin parish church. Her ashes were scattered in Henley and at the Cliffs of Moher in Ireland. Each year her fans gather in Henley to celebrate "Dusty Day" on the closest Sunday to her birthday (16 April).
- Sir Ninian Stephen (1923-2017), Australian judge and Governor-General of Australia (1982–1989), was born in Henley
- Harry Stott, joint winner of I'd Do Anything and star of TV show Roman Mysteries.
- Philip Strange (1884-1963), singer and actor, was born in Henley. His father, Sir William Anker Simmons, was four times mayor of Henley.
- David Tomlinson (1917–2000), actor, was born and raised in Henley.
- Jonathan Lloyd Walker, actor, was born and raised here. He now lives in West Vancouver, Canada.

== Media ==
=== Newspaper ===
Henley has one local newspaper, the Henley Standard which is also available online.

=== News website ===
In addition to the Henley Standard website, there is another source of news online: the Henley Herald.

=== Radio ===
Local radio stations are BBC Radio Berkshire on 94.6 FM, Heart South on 103.4 FM, Greatest Hits Radio Berkshire and North Hampshire on 107.0 FM and London's radio stations such as Capital and Magic along with a few others can also be received. Regatta Radio was broadcast during Henley Royal Regatta for a number of years up to 2014.

=== Television ===
As Henley is on an overlap of TV regions, it is possible to receive signals from the Crystal Palace (BBC London/ITV London) and Hannington (BBC South/ITV Meridian) transmitters. However, the local relay transmitter for Henley only broadcasts programmes from ITV London and BBC London, making Henley the only part of Oxfordshire included within the London television region.

=== In popular culture ===
The British sitcom The Upper Hand is set in Henley-on-Thames.

Henley-on-Thames was represented in the 2010 American drama film The Social Network as the site of a rowing competition between the US and the Netherlands.

== Twin towns, sister cities and related localities ==
Henley is twinned with:

- Bled, Slovenia
- Falaise, Calvados, France since 1974
- Leichlingen, Germany

And has a 'friendship link' with:

- Borama, Somaliland

In addition, several localities around the world are named after Henley, including:

- Henley, a suburb of Sydney, New South Wales, Australia.
- Henley Beach, a suburb of Adelaide, South Australia.
- Henley, a township on the Taieri Plain in New Zealand.

== See also ==
- Brakspear Brewery, founded in 1779 but now moved to Witney
- Henley Festival, held each July
- Henley shirt, a garment named after the town because it was the traditional uniform of the rowing clubs
- Stuart Turner Ltd, Henley-based engineering company founded in 1906
- Henley-on-Thames travel guide from Wikivoyage

== Bibliography ==
- Allison, Barbara (2011). "Henley's Major Inns in the Seventeenth and Early Eighteenth Centuries". Oxoniensia. LXXVI. Oxfordshire Architectural and Historical Society: 55–79. ISSN 0308-5562.
- The Cardinals (2014). Friar Park: A Pictorial History. Campfire Publishing. ISBN 978-1502573261.
- The Henley Guide. With fifteen illustrations. London: Hickman and Stapledon. 1826.
- Sherwood, Jennifer; Pevsner, Nikolaus (1974). Oxfordshire. The Buildings of England. Harmondsworth: Penguin Books. pp. 335–345. ISBN 0-14-071045-0.
- Townley, Simon C, ed. (2011). A History of the County of Oxford. Victoria County History. Vol. 16: Binfield Hundred (Part One): Henley-on-Thames and Environs. Woodbridge: Boydell and Brewer. ISBN 978-1-904356-38-7.
