= St Mary the Virgin, Wheatley =

Coordinates: 51.7476°N 1.1367°W

Church of St Mary the Virgin
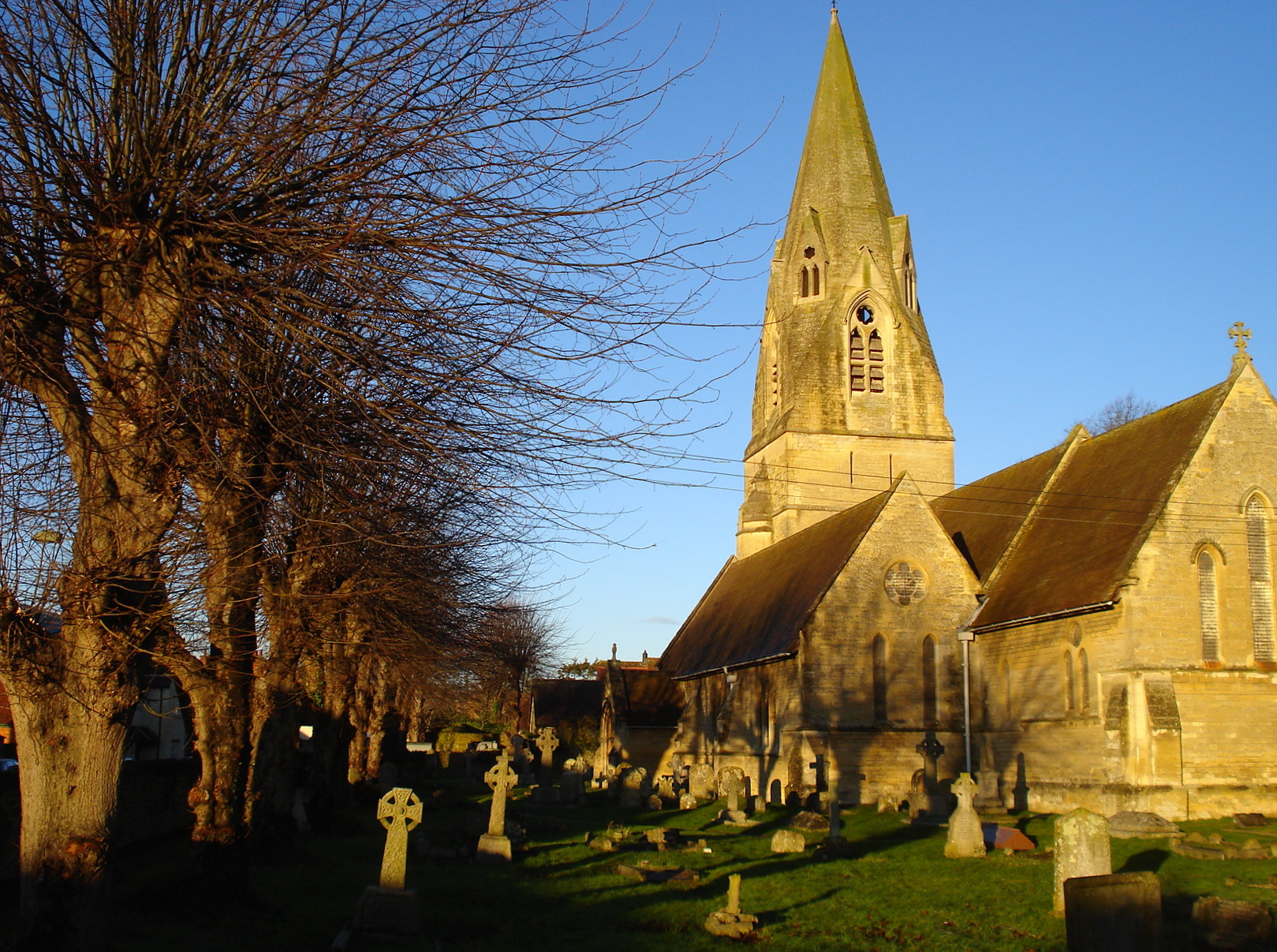
- St Mary's Church and graveyard
- Church of St Mary the Virgin
- Location: Wheatley, Oxfordshire, England
- Denomination: Church of England
- Website: https://sites.google.com/stmaryswheatley.org/stmaryswheatley/home

Administration
- Province: Canterbury
- Diocese: Oxford

The Church of St Mary the Virgin is a parish church in Wheatley, Oxfordshire, in the Church of England Diocese of Oxford.

The church was designed by George Edmund Street and built in 1855–57 in the Gothic Revival style. It is listed at Grade II*.

A past vicar of the church was the Reverend Hubert Brasier, father of former British Prime Minister Theresa May, who was married at the church.

The churchyard contains three Commonwealth war graves, of a Wiltshire Regiment soldier of World War I, and a Royal Navy sailor and Oxfordshire and Buckinghamshire Light Infantry soldier of World War II.
