= Tetsworth =

Village in Oxfordshire, England

Coordinates: 51.710°N 1.009°W

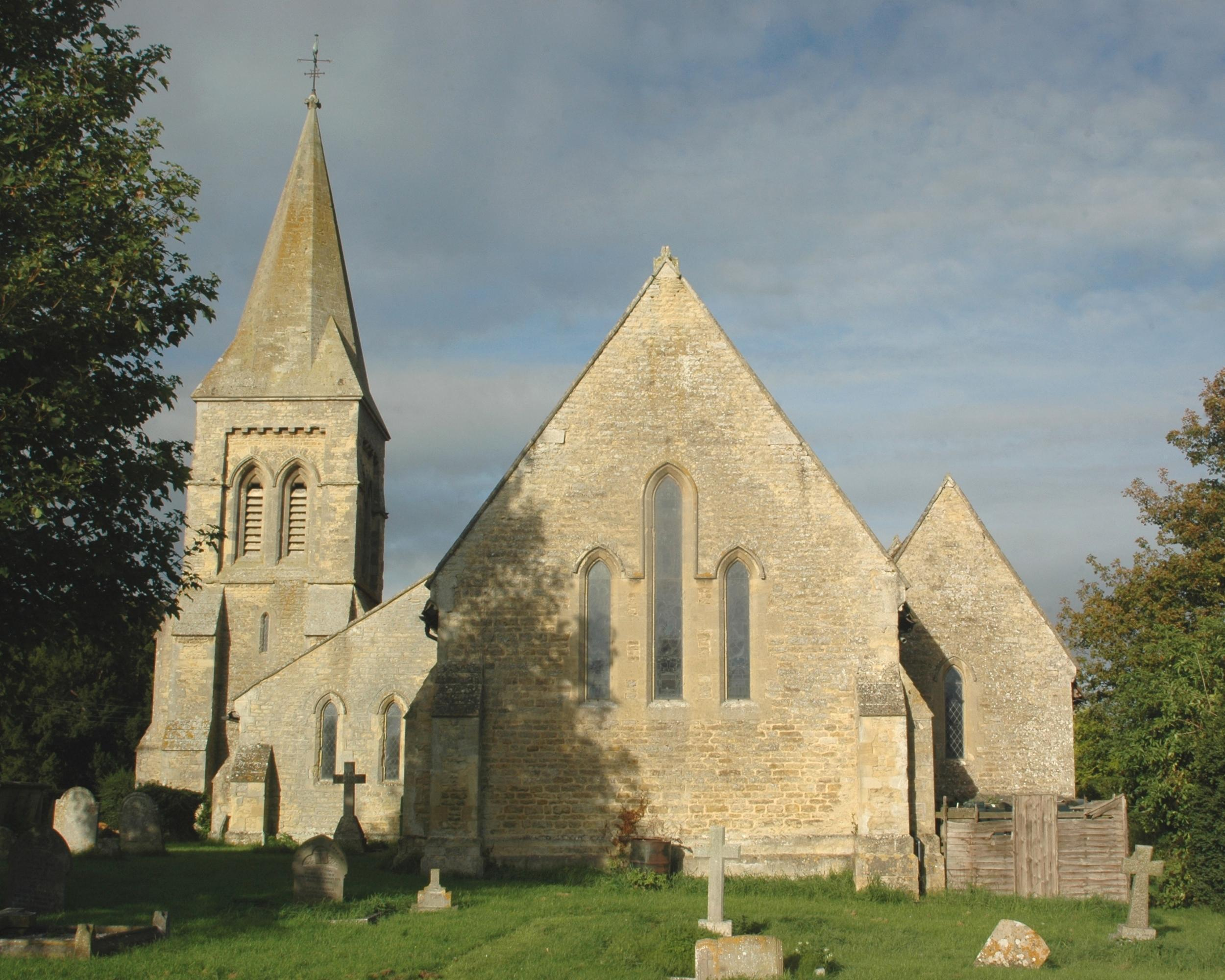
- St. Giles' parish church

- Location within Oxfordshire
- Area: 10.60 km^{2} (4.09 sq mi)
- Population: 693 (2011 census)
  - Density: 65/km^{2} (170/sq mi)
- OS grid reference: SP6801
- Civil parish: Tetsworth
- District: South Oxfordshire
- Shire county: Oxfordshire
- Region: South East
- Country: England
- Sovereign state: United Kingdom
- Post town: Thame
- Postcode district: OX9
- Dialling code: 01844
- Police: Thames Valley
- Fire: Oxfordshire
- Ambulance: South Central
- UK Parliament: Henley and Thame
- Website: Tetsworth Parish Council

Tetsworth is a village and civil parish about 3 miles (5 km) south of Thame in Oxfordshire. Its Parish Council is made up of six elected Councillors. The estimated population in 2018 was 752 persons. According to the Council (in late 2019), the business included the Zioxi educational furniture plant, the Swan antiques centre and some nearby equestrian and agricultural enterprises. The village no longer had a post office or many retail operations, but retained its "church, primary school, village hall, sports on the village green, and village pub and restaurant."

== History ==
At the time of the Domesday Book in 1086 Tetsworth did not exist as a separate manor. One summary of the village history states that Tetsworth lands were included in the Bishop of Lincoln's Thame manor of 60 hides." In the 12th century, benefactors gave land in the area to the Cistercian Thame Abbey and these lands were brought together as an estate under the abbey's control. Records indicate that during 1209–12 "Peter Talemasch and Robert Danvers were returned as joint lords of Tetsworth," of lands not owned by the abbey. By about 1225, the abbey held 20 virgates of land at Tetsworth, initially called the Grange but from 1365 called a manor. In 1316, Simon Danvers and the Abbot of Thame were the joint lords of Tetsworth.

In 1539, Thame Abbey was suppressed under the Dissolution of the Monasteries and surrendered all its properties to the Crown. In 1542, the Crown granted the manor of Thame to Robert King, Bishop of Oxford. In 1547, the King leased Thame to Sir John Williams, but the lease was terminated, and in 1558 or 1560 the Diocese sold Tetsworth to a "number of London residents". By 1589, the Crown held the manor again and was in the process of selling it to Christopher Petty of Tetsworth and his son Charnell. Tetsworth remained in the Petty family until Christopher's great-grandson, also called Christopher, inherited it in 1674. He was described as a man of "unthriftiness, folly, and extravagance" who dissipated his family fortune, sold parts of the estate in 1680 and the whole of the remaining manor to Thomas Phillips of Ickford in 1683.

Thomas's grandson, Henry Phillips, sold Tetsworth to Willoughby Bertie, 4th Earl of Abingdon, in 1756. Montagu Bertie, 5th Earl of Abingdon, sold the manor again in 1810. In 1810, the manor was "apparently" sold to the Rev. Samuel Ryder Weston and he left it to Charlotte Weston on his death; Charlotte retained ownership for some years but by 1859, it was owned by the Matthews family who sold the manor and farm in about 1866 to a local farmer, Joseph Cornish. As of 1872, the manor was owned by a Miss Weston.

== Parish church ==
The Church of England parish church of Saint Giles was originally Saxon. It was largely rebuilt in the 12th century in the Norman style, with some fine features including the tympanum over the south door. The chancel was rebuilt in the 13th century, and in the 15th century, new Perpendicular Gothic windows were inserted in the nave. St. Giles was a prebendal chapel of the parish of Thame until 1841, when Tetsworth was made a separate ecclesiastical parish.

The first incumbent of the new parish was Rev. John W. Peers, a member of the Peers family of Chiselhampton House. (He was vicar from 1841 until 1876). In 1846, Peers had a vicarage built, and in 1851, he proposed to demolish the parish church and replace it with a new one. The Oxford diocesan architect, G. E. Street, reported that parts of the old church building were "of very considerable merit, and in good preservation," the chancel was "very perfect," and it would be "very inadvisable" to allow their demolition. Samuel Wilberforce, Bishop of Oxford, also opposed the Peers' proposal. Nevertheless, Peers demolished the old church, and in 1855 the new one was completed and Bishop Wilberforce consecrated it.

The architect John Billing designed the new church in the Early English Gothic style. Sherwood and Pevsner described the new building as "a clumsy design" and the bell-tower as "excessively heavy". By the end of the 18th century, the old church had a ring of six bells. They were rehung in the new church, and Mears and Stainbank of the Whitechapel Bell Foundry recast them all in 1936. The Old Vicarage has been Grade II listed since 1963 as "Vicarage, now house. c.1846" and the Church of Saint Giles was also Grade II listed since that year. The summary for the latter includes this description:

Church. c.1855, by J. Billing of Reading. Coursed squared stone; old plain-tile roof to nave, aisle, chancel and vestry; stone tower. 5-bay nave with south aisle, 2-bay chancel, tower to south, vestry to north. Early English style. 2-centre arched doorway to base of tower with double-leaf plank doors.

== Chapel ==
In the 19th century Tetsworth was an "open village" without such strong control from a squire and parson as other more "closed" villages. It was therefore more open to population migration and religious and social pluralism. For this reason Tetsworth was nicknamed "Botany Bay" after the settlement in New South Wales. There was a nonconformist congregation in Tetsworth by the early years of the 19th century and a chapel was built in 1823. The chapel seems to have been a mixture of Baptist, Congregational and Wesleyan elements. The congregation founded a Sunday School in 1824.

In 1842, it joined the local Congregational Association, but five years later, it appointed a Baptist pastor, and the Congregational Association withdrew its support. Subsequently, the chapel had Wesleyan pastors, but in 1864 it was readmitted to the local Congregational Association. In 1890, a new chapel was built, and the old one became the Sunday School. In the 20th century, the congregation dwindled until in 1958 it had only four members.

== Economic and social history ==
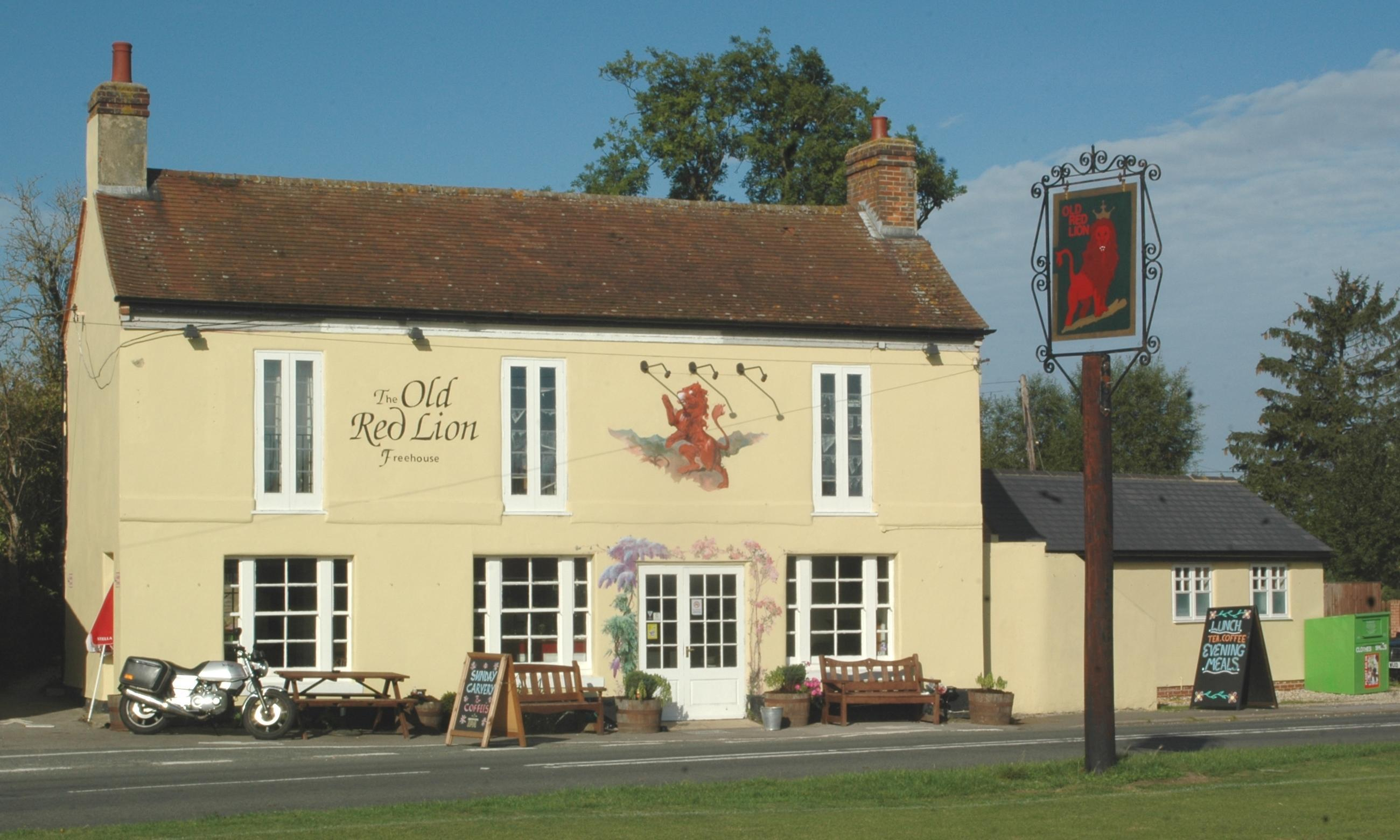
The Old Red Lion public house

By 1502, Tetsworth had two inns, The Crown and The Swan. The current Swan Hotel was built in the 17th century and remodelled in about 1700. It is now a restaurant and antiques centre. The hotel has been Grade II Listed since 1963; the listing indicates that it was probably built in the early 1600s but was subsequently modified in the 18th and 20th century. Other public houses in Tetsworth have come and gone over the centuries. As of 1838, when the London-Oxford turnpike (which opened in 1718) was still in use, another inn was operating, known as the King's Arms. The Old Red Lion remains in business today as a hotel and pub. Tetsworth also has a Sports and Social Club.

By 1818, a private day school had been founded by Isaac Caterer who became a minister of the Congregational church in 1828. In 1847, Rev. John Peers and other subscribers paid for a Church of England school to be built in the centre of the village. It later became a National School. In 1938 it was reorganised as a junior school, with secondary pupils attending schools in Thame. It is now a County Primary School.

Although the village was primarily agricultural, the 1851 Census specified that certain tradesmen were operating: "5 butchers and grocers and a baker, 7 milliners, dressmakers, and drapers, a tailor, a hairdresser and a shoemaker .... 4 wheelwrights, 2 blacksmiths and their journeymen, a saddler, a harnessmaker, and a joiner." By this time, the London road had minimal importance to the village since the railroad had reached this area. The 1870-72 Imperial Gazetteer provided a summary of the community:

a parish, with a village, in Thame district, Oxford; 3 miles SSW of Thame r. station. It has a head post-office, and a hotel; and it carries on a manufacture of pillow lace. Acres, 1,172. Real property, £2,827. Pop., 481. Houses, 108... The living is a vicarage in the diocese of Oxford. Value, £130... The church was recently rebuilt. There are an Independent chapel and a national school.

A Council report indicates that the community has always been primarily agricultural and that it experienced poverty during the early 19th century but had regained some prosperity by 1851. However, by 1931, the population had dropped from 500 in the mid 1850s to under 300. By the 2011 Census, that had increased to about 700 people.

== Sources ==
- Emery, Frank (1974). The Oxfordshire Landscape. The Making of the English Landscape. London: Hodder & Stoughton. pp. 34, 173. ISBN 0-340-04301-6.
- Lobel, Mary D, ed. (1962). A History of the County of Oxford: Volume 7: Dorchester and Thame Hundreds. Victoria County History. pp. 147–160.
- Sherwood, Jennifer; Pevsner, Nikolaus (1974). Oxfordshire. The Buildings of England. Harmondsworth: Penguin Books. pp. 805–806. ISBN 0-14-071045-0.
