= St Mary's Church, Pyrton =

Coordinates: 51.6559°N 1.0060°W

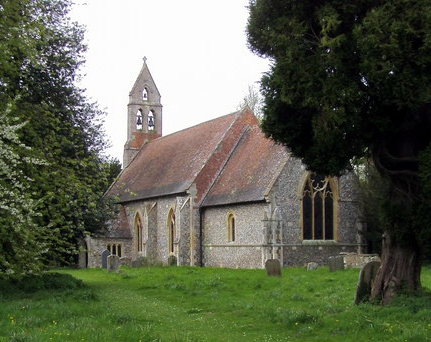
- St Mary's parish church from the southeast

- Location in Oxfordshire
- OS grid reference: SU687957
- Location: Pyrton, Oxfordshire
- Country: England
- Denomination: Church of England
- Website: St Mary, Pyrton

History
- Status: parish church
- Consecrated: 1856

Architecture
- Functional status: Active
- Heritage designation: Grade II*
- Designated: 18 June 1963
- Architect: J. C. Buckler
- Architectural type: Church
- Style: Norman, Gothic Revival
- Completed: 1856

Specifications
- Materials: Flint with limestone dressings tile roof

Administration
- Province: Canterbury
- Diocese: Oxford
- Archdeaconry: Oxford
- Deanery: Aston and Cuddesdon
- Parish: Pyrton and Shirburn

Clergy
- Rector: Rev Daniel Thompson

St Mary's Church is the Church of England parish church of Pyrton, Oxfordshire, England. Its parish is part of the benefice of Icknield, in the deanery of Aston and Cuddesdon, the archdeaconry of Oxford and the diocese of Oxford. The church is recorded in the National Heritage List for England as a designated Grade II* listed building.

== History ==
An early Anglo Saxon Chronicle Charter mentions the presence of a church at Pyrton by 887. (Note: The text reads as follows: "A.D. 880 for 887. Æthelred, dux et patricius of Mercia, to the bishopric of Worcester; grant of 6 hides (mansiones) at Brightwell Baldwin and 8 at Watlington, Oxon., to pertain to the church at Readanoran (i.e. Pyrton, Oxon). With a list, in English, of six serfs formerly belonging to the royal vill at Bensington, Oxon.") In about 1115 it was granted to an Augustinian foundation of canons at Runcorn, Cheshire, by William fitz Nigel, who was Lord of Pyrton and Baron of Halton. In 1134 the community of canons was moved to the nearby village of Norton and the church remained in the possession of Norton Priory until the dissolution of the monasteries in 1536. The rectory and advowson were then granted to Christ Church, Oxford. In 1943 the parish was united with that of Shirburn. The united parish is now part of the benefice of Icknield.

The present church building dates from the 12th century with a porch added in the 15th century. The nave and chancel were largely rebuilt in 1854 by J. C. Buckler, who preserved the basic lines of the former church and retained some of the original features. The nave was lengthened by 6 feet (2 m) at the west end to provide seating for an additional 120 people. In 1929 additional heating was installed and in 1939 electric lighting was added and the organ replaced a harmonium in 1953.

== Architecture ==
=== Exterior ===
The church is built in knapped and coursed flint with ashlar limestone dressings and a gabled tile roof. Its plan consists of a chancel with vestry, a three-bay nave with a south porch and a bell-cote at the west end. The remaining Norman features are the south doorway, the chancel arch and the internal part of window in the north wall of the nave. A similar window in the south wall of the nave is a Victorian copy. The east window has three lights, the chancel has 12th-century lancet windows and in the vestry are round-arched 19th-century windows. At the west end is a two-light window flanked with buttresses. The bell-cote has trefoil-headed lancet windows above two cinquefoil-headed bell openings.

=== Interior ===
The pews, lectern and stained glass date from the 19th century; the glass in one of the nave windows erected in 1893 was made by Clayton and Bell. In the south porch are medieval tiles of six different designs. The oak pulpit is dated 1636. The wooden parish chest was acquired in 1638. The font dates from the 12th century and has a mid-19th century cover. The church contains a number of memorials, the oldest of which is a slab of Purbeck marble in front of the altar in memory of a priest. It dates from around 1340 and formerly had an inscription in brass letters. The monuments in the nave are mostly to members of the Hamersley family; one of these is a brass tablet dated 1929 which was designed by Eric Gill. The ring consists of three bells; two of these are dated 1605 and 1606, the other was given in 1953 to replace a bell dated 1593. The parish registers date from 1568 and there are churchwardens' accounts from between 1548 and 1882.

== External features ==
Two chest tombs in the churchyard dating from the 18th century are listed at Grade II.
