= Brakspear Brewery =

Brewery in Oxfordshire, England

W. H. Brakspear & Sons Ltd
- Industry: Brewing
- Headquarters: Henley-on-Thames, UK
- Products: Beer

Brakspear Special

W. H. Brakspear & Sons Ltd. was a brewery in Henley-on-Thames, Oxfordshire, England. Since the closure of the brewery in 2002, its beers have been brewed by Wychwood Brewery in West Oxfordshire. In 1993, beer writer Michael Jackson described its "ordinary" bitter as the best in England.

== History ==
In 1711, W. H. Brakspear bought a brewery on Bell Street, Henley-on-Thames. The Brakspear family was distantly related to Nicholas Breakspear, who became Pope Adrian IV in 1154 — the only Englishman to become Pope. In 1812, the brewery moved to a Thames-side location on New Street.

The brewery was used in 1990 episode of Inspector Morse, "Sins of the Fathers". In 2002, W. H. Brakspear & Sons licensed the brewing of its beers to Refresh UK, owner of Wychwood Brewery, and the brewery ceased production and closed. The site was sold and part of it converted to a Hotel du Vin boutique hotel.

The now non-brewing Brakspear Pub Company and its estate of 104 pubs was bought in 2006 by pub chain J. T. Davies for £106 million; the 51 Davies pubs were rebranded as Brakspear. After being brewed at Burtonwood, Cheshire, production of Brakspear beers was moved, along with some of the historic Henley brewing vessels, to Refresh's Wychwood Brewery in Witney, Oxfordshire. Refresh UK was subsequently bought out by Marston's.

In spring 2013 Brakspear Pub Company made a limited return to brewing with the commissioning of the Bell Street Brewery in its Bull public house in Bell Street, Henley-on-Thames.

Following the 2023 closure of the Wychwood Brewery in Witney, production of Brakspear's brands temporarily transferred to the Banks's Brewery in Wolverhampton. When the Wolverhampton site shut down at the end of August 2025, Brakspear's production shifted to Carlsberg's heavily upgraded brewery in Burton-upon-Trent.

As of September 2026, Brakspear beers are now being brewed by Hogs Back Brewery in Surrey and have returned to the original Double Drop fermentation method.

== Brewing ==
Brakspear's beer is brewed using the traditional double drop fermentation method. This involves allowing fermentation to start in vessels on an upper floor, before 'dropping' into a second vessel below. This leaves tired or dead yeast and unwanted solids ('trub') behind and encourages a healthier fermentation. Refresh UK claims that Brakspear beers possess a butterscotch flavour due to diacetyl produced through this method and their particular long-lived, multi-strain yeast. The yeast has "distant origins" at Mann, Crossman & Paulin in Mile End, London.

When beer writer Michael Jackson visited in 1993, the barley was Maris Otter and water came from their own well, described as "chalk-hard". Hops were Goldings from Kent, Hereford Fuggles and "Styrians". Jackson thought the ordinary bitter the best in England, writing "In its delicate, malty sweetness, teasing, yeasty fruitiness, and hoppy bitterness, Brakspear's 'ordinary' is lightly refreshing, gently sociable, more-ish and appetite-arousing; the perfect combination in a bitter. The hoppiness is its salient feature". John Mortimer in 1986 claimed "Brakspear's draught bitter is undoubtedly the best to be had in England".
