= Oxfordshire Way =

68-mile footpath in Oxfordshire, England

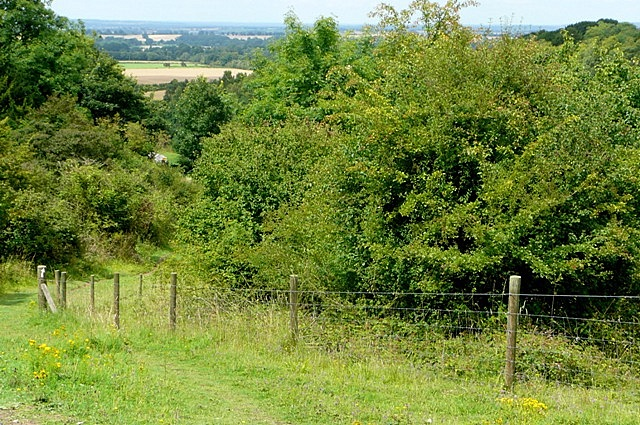
- At Christmas Common
- Length: 68 mi (109 km)
- Location: Oxfordshire (and Gloucestershire), England
- Trailheads: Bourton-on-the-Water to Henley-on-Thames
- Use: Hiking

The Oxfordshire Way is a long-distance walk in Oxfordshire, England, with 6 miles in Gloucestershire and very short sections in Buckinghamshire. The path links with the Heart of England Way and the Thames Path.

The path runs for 68 miles (109 km) from Bourton-on-the-Water, Gloucestershire, to Henley-on-Thames. It passes from the Cotswolds to the Chiltern Hills, with hilly sections towards each end and gentler country in the middle sections. It takes between 4 and 6 days to walk.

From Bourton-on-the-Water to Kirtlington the path forms part of European walking route E2.

== Route ==
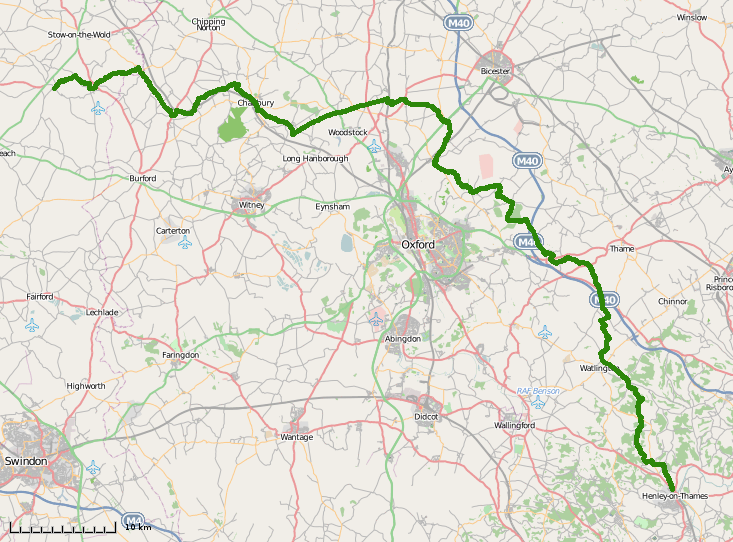
Oxfordshire Way route map

From Bourton-on-the-Water the path passes through the villages of Wyck Rissington and Bledington, then follows the valley of the River Evenlode to Shipton-under-Wychwood, Ascott-under-Wychwood and the small town of Charlbury. It then passes through Stonesfield and follows Akeman Street for 6 miles, including a crossing of Blenheim Park. After crossing the Oxford Canal the path passes through Kirtlington and Weston-on-the-Green to Islip, the halfway point.

From Islip the path runs by Noke, Beckley and the southern edge of Bernwood Forest to Waterperry. It then passes through Waterstock, Tiddington and Tetsworth. Across the M40 motorway it passes the small settlements of Adwell and Wheatfield, then after a glimpse of Shirburn Castle it reaches Pyrton.

From Pyrton the path crosses the Ridgeway National Trail, and climbs the Chiltern escarpment to Christmas Common. The remainder of the route is through the Chiltern beechwoods, passing Pishill, Maidensgrove, Bix Bottom and Middle Assendon to arrive at Henley.

== Transport ==
Railway stations at Shipton-under-Wychwood, Ascott-under-Wychwood (limited service), and Charlbury (on the Cotswold Line), Islip and Henley-on-Thames are on the path, and Tackley and Kingham are near to it. Towns and villages on or near the route with bus connections to railheads include Bourton-on-the-Water (for Cheltenham and Moreton-in-Marsh), Woodstock (for Oxford), Kirtlington (for Oxford and Bicester), Tiddington (for Oxford and Aylesbury), and Watlington (for Oxford, some services to Reading). The route also passes not too far from Lewknor, where the Oxford Tube coach service frequently connects to Oxford and London.
