= Maidensgrove =

Hamlet in Oxfordshire, England

Coordinates: 51.58°N 0.96°W

- Location within Oxfordshire
- OS grid reference: SU7288
- Civil parish: Pishill with Stonor; Swyncombe
- District: South Oxfordshire
- Shire county: Oxfordshire
- Region: South East
- Country: England
- Sovereign state: United Kingdom
- Post town: Henley-on-Thames
- Postcode district: RG9
- Dialling code: 01491
- Police: Thames Valley
- Fire: Oxfordshire
- Ambulance: South Central
- UK Parliament: Henley

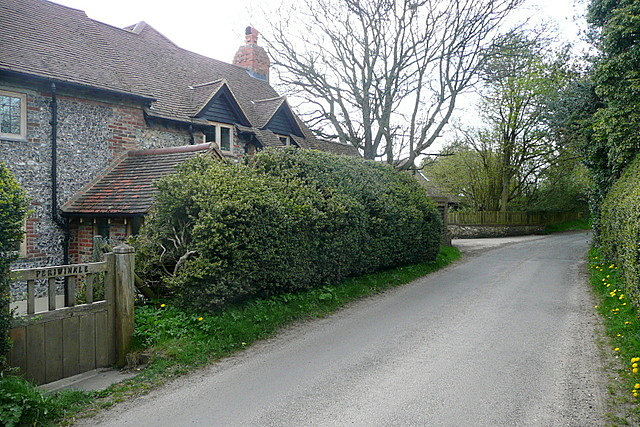
Periwinkle at Upper Maidensgrove by Graham Horn

Maidensgrove is a hamlet above the Stonor valley in the Chiltern Hills, adjacent to Russell's Water common. It is about 5 miles (8.0 km) northwest of Henley-on-Thames in South Oxfordshire, England. There is a 16th-century public house called The Five Horseshoes at nearby Upper Maidensgrove. The Chiltern Way and Oxfordshire Way long-distance paths pass close by, with several other walks through the village, and the Warburg Nature Reserve is to the south.
