= Reynardson =

Reynardson is a surname. Notable people by that name include:

- Bill Birch Reynardson (1923–2017), barrister involved in the development of marine law
- Abraham Reynardson (1589–1661), English merchant who was Lord Mayor of London
- Henry Thomas Birch Reynardson (1892–1972) British soldier in the Oxfordshire and Buckinghamshire Light Infantry
- Edward Birch Reynardson (1812–1896), British Army officer who served during the Crimean War
