= BICS =

BICS may refer to:

- BICS (company), Belgian telecoms business
- Bangladesh Islami Chhatra Shibir, Islamic student organization in Bangladesh
- Basic interpersonal communicative skills, needed to interact in social situations
- Bitstream International Character Set, a multi-byte character set by Bitstream
- Bloomberg Industry Classification Standard, an industry classification
- Brussels International Catholic School, in Brussels, Belgium.

== See also ==
- BIC (disambiguation)
- Bix (disambiguation)
- Hamden Bics, a basketball team in New Haven, Connecticut
