= Bix =

Bix may refer to:

== Arts and entertainment ==
- Bix (film), a 1991 Italian film about Beiderbecke
- Bix (rock group), a Lithuanian rock group
- Bix (website), a defunct contest website owned by Yahoo!
- Annual events named for Beiderbecke in Davenport, Iowa
  - Bix 7 Road Race
  - Bix Beiderbecke Memorial Jazz Festival
- Bix Barton, a comic book character in the British science fiction anthology magazine 2000 AD
- Bix, a fictional Protoceratops in the Dinotopia books by James Gurney
- Bix Caleen, a character in the Star Wars show Andor

== People ==
- Amy Bix, American historian of science
- Herbert P. Bix, American historian and writer
- Hermann Bix (1914–1986), German World War II panzer commander
- B. Bix Aliu, American diplomat
- Bix Beiderbecke (1903–1931), American jazz musician

== Other uses ==
- BIX (telephony), a telephony cross-connect system created in the 1970s by Nortel Networks
- Bix, Oxfordshire, a village in Oxfordshire, England
  - Bix and Assendon, a parish formerly called just "Bix"
- Byte Information Exchange (BIX), a mid-1980s commercial online service offered by Byte magazine

== See also ==
- B9 (disambiguation) (B.IX)
- Bics (disambiguation)
