= Adwell =

Village in Oxfordshire, England

Coordinates: 51.691°N 0.993°W

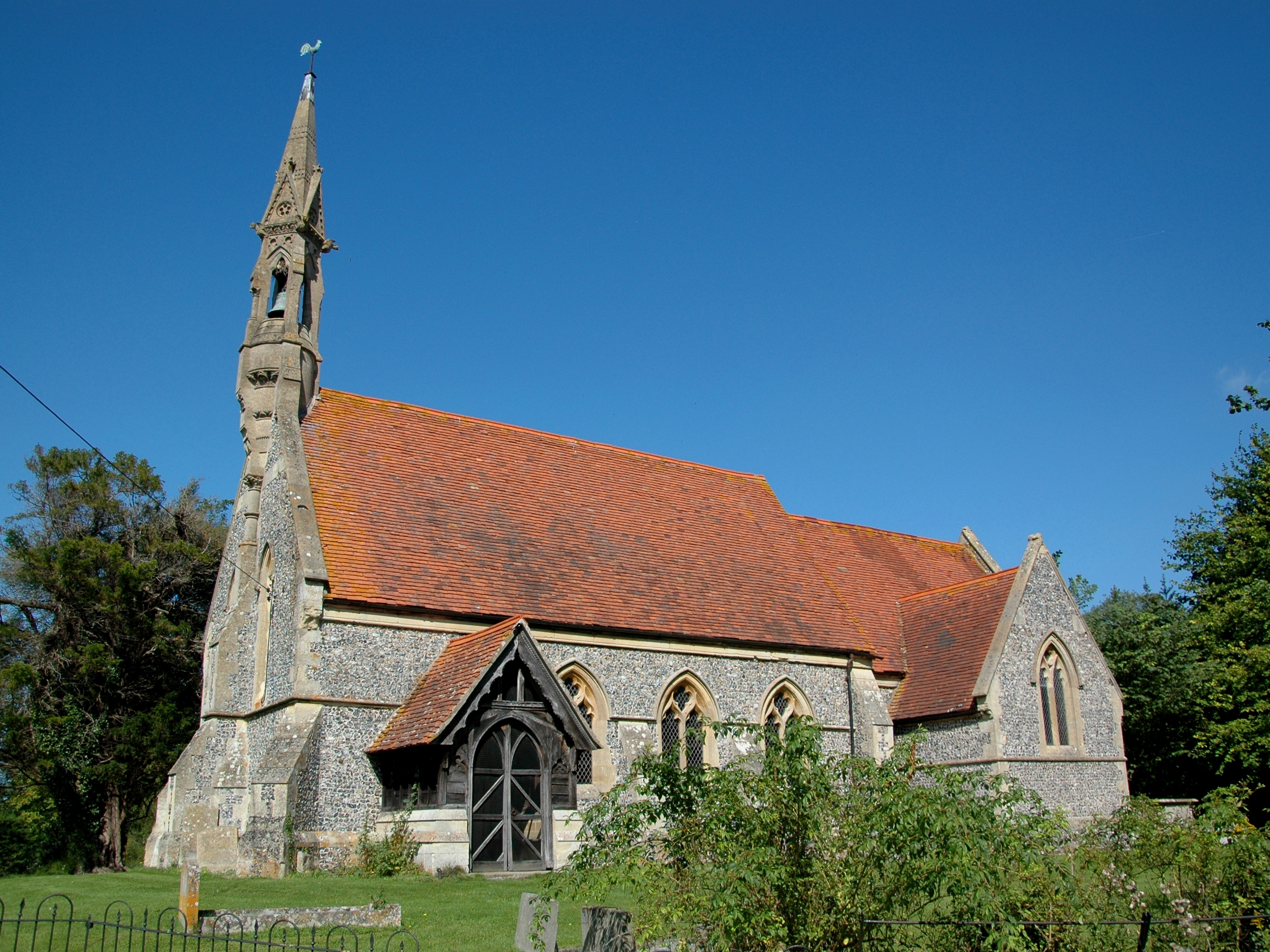
- St. Mary's parish church

- Location within Oxfordshire
- Population: 27 (2001 census)
- OS grid reference: SU6999
- Civil parish: Adwell
- District: South Oxfordshire
- Shire county: Oxfordshire
- Region: South East
- Country: England
- Sovereign state: United Kingdom
- Post town: Thame
- Postcode district: OX9
- Dialling code: 01844
- Police: Thames Valley
- Fire: Oxfordshire
- Ambulance: South Central
- UK Parliament: Henley and Thame
- Website: Adwell Parish Meeting

Adwell is a village and civil parish about 3 miles (5 km) south of Thame in South Oxfordshire. The parish covers 443 acres (179 ha),

== Demography ==
The 2011 census incorporated its figures into an output area accordingly used to enlarge the civil parish definition of Shirburn to the south, incorporating these two settlements and Stoke Talmage due to their small population.

== Archaeology ==
Adwell Cop, 1/2 mile (800 m) southeast of the village, is a 486-foot (148 m) hill topped with a Bronze Age burial mound. Iron Age pottery has been found nearby. Formerly the Cop was erroneously attributed to the Danes, who were in Oxfordshire in 1010.

== Manor ==
Until the Norman Conquest of England, a Saxon called Wulfstan held the manor of Adwell, as well as three others in the area including Britwell Salome. The Domesday Book records that by 1086 Advelle had been granted to the Norman Miles Crispin, the first castellan of Wallingford Castle. As such, Adwell became part of the Honour of Wallingford. In 1300 Adwell was escheated to the Crown, and later it was made part of the Honour of Ewelme.

Early in the 19th century Adwell manor was inherited by John H Birch, who took the name Newell Birch as a condition of the legacy. He left the house to his nephew Henry Birch Reynardson, in whose family the house has remained. In the 20th century three generations of Birch Reynardson served as High Sheriff of Oxfordshire: WJB Birch Reynardson in 1913, Lieutenant-Colonel Henry Thomas Birch Reynardson CMG in 1958 and Bill Birch Reynardson in 1974. Thomas Birch Reynardson served as High Sheriff in 2015.

The manor house is Adwell House. There has been a 17th-century house on this site, but it was rebuilt in either the late 18th or early 19th century. It is a Grade II* listed building.

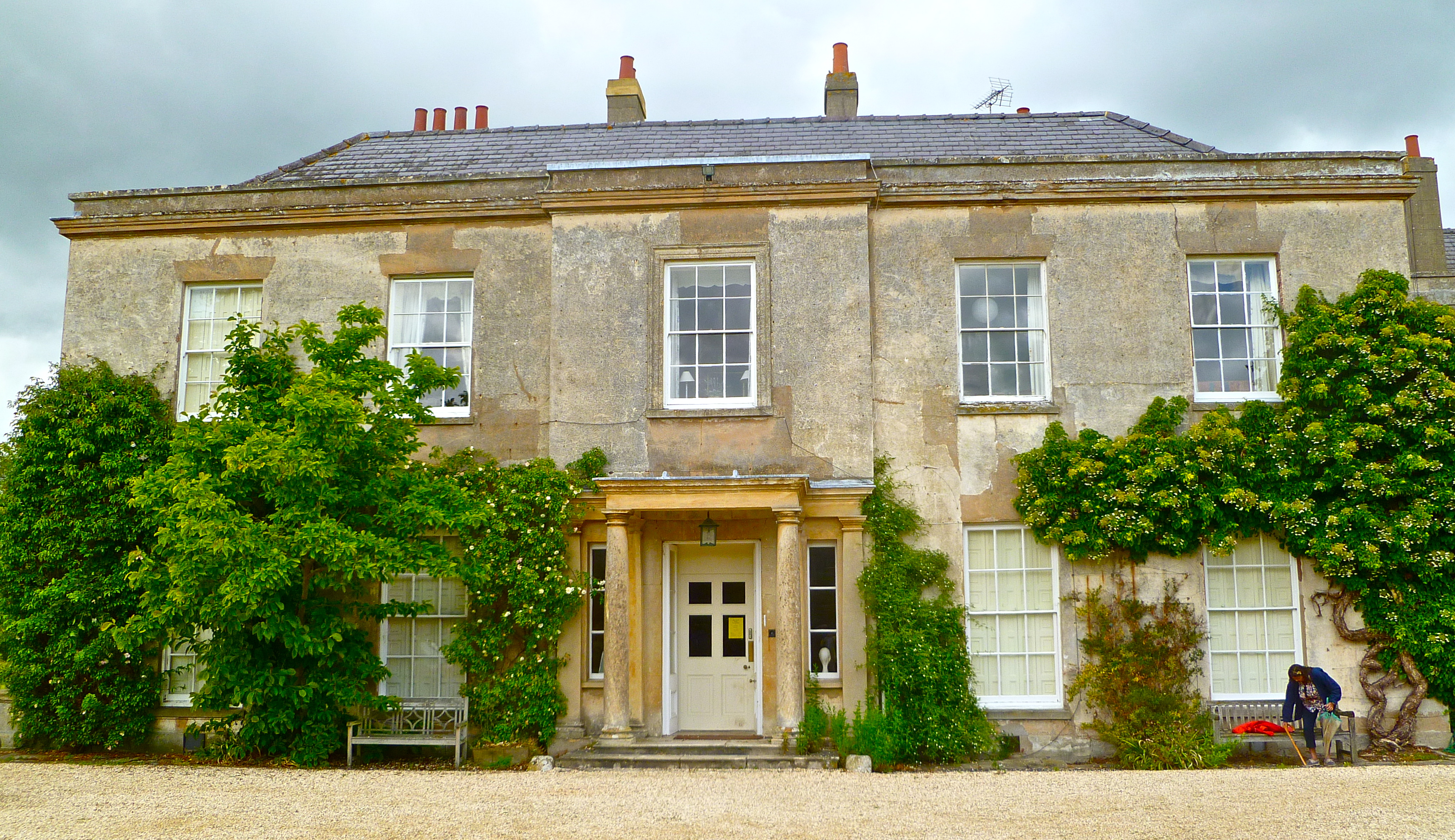
Adwell House

== Parish church ==
Adwell's original parish church is believed to have been built late in the 12th century, although the earliest documentation of it is dated 1254. It had only a nave and chancel. The latter may have been enlarged in the 13th century, judging by its east window which was early Decorated Gothic. In the 14th century new windows were inserted in the nave and a new west door was added. In 1553 the building was recorded as having a bell-cot with two bells. All of the walls were repaired around 1800, but by the early 1860s the building was considered too weak to be restored.

The old church building was demolished and in 1865 it was replaced with a new Church of England parish church of Saint Mary designed by the Gothic Revival architect Arthur Blomfield. Blomfield's design replicated the early Decorated style, but the new building retained the south doorway of the old church, which is in the transitional style between Norman and Early English Gothic. The new church also retains the memorials from inside the old one, including a stone effigy of a knight from about 1300. The new building has no aisles, but has north and south chapels arranged as transepts either side of the chancel. There is no tower, but a bell-cot with one bell. The bell dates from about 1350 and so may be from the old church building. St Mary's parish is now part of the Benefice of Thame.

== Amenities ==
The Oxfordshire Way footpath passes the western edge of the village.

== Sources ==
- Lobel, Mary D, ed. (1964). A History of the County of Oxford. Victoria County History. Vol. 8: Lewknor and Pyrton Hundreds. London: Oxford University Press for the Institute of Historical Research. pp. 7–16.
- Sherwood, Jennifer; Pevsner, Nikolaus (1974). Oxfordshire. The Buildings of England. Harmondsworth: Penguin Books. p. 419. ISBN 0-14-071045-0.
