= Lower Assendon =

Village in Oxfordshire, England

Coordinates: 51.555°N 0.928°W

- Location within Oxfordshire
- OS grid reference: SU744846
- Civil parish: Bix and Assendon
- District: South Oxfordshire
- Shire county: Oxfordshire
- Region: South East
- Country: England
- Sovereign state: United Kingdom
- Post town: Henley-on-Thames
- Postcode district: RG9
- Dialling code: 01491
- Police: Thames Valley
- Fire: Oxfordshire
- Ambulance: South Central
- UK Parliament: Henley
- Website: The Parish of Bix & Assendon

Lower Assendon is a village in the Assendon valley in the Chiltern Hills, about 1.5 miles (2.4 km) northwest of Henley-on-Thames in South Oxfordshire, England. The road between Henley and Wallingford passes the village. It was made into a turnpike in 1736 and ceased to be a turnpike in 1873. It is now classified the A4130. The village has a public house, The Golden Ball, that is now a gastropub. Henley Park is just east of the village. It was a medieval deer park and in 1300 became part of the manor of Henley. In the Georgian era the park was converted into a landscape garden with "beautiful inclosures descending in natural waving slopes from the house." Fairmile Cemetery, on a hillside southwest of the village, belongs to Henley Town Council.

== Sources ==
- Emery, Frank (1974). The Oxfordshire Landscape. The Making of the English Landscape. London: Hodder & Stoughton. pp. 131, 206. ISBN 0-340-04301-6.
