= Bix, Oxfordshire =

Village in Oxfordshire, England

Coordinates: 51.562°N 0.951°W

Bix
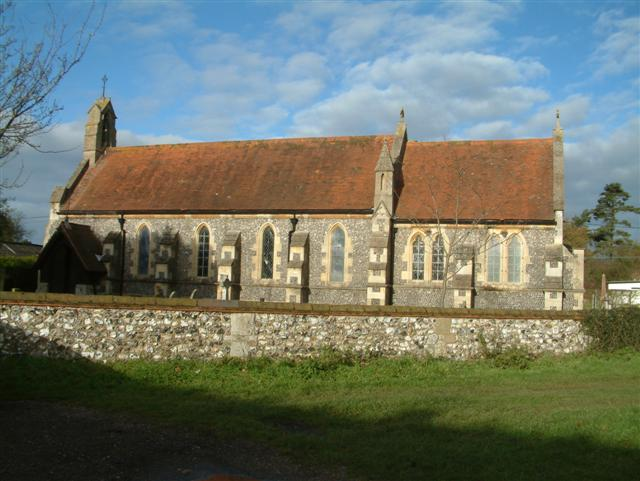
- St. James' parish church

- Location within Oxfordshire
- OS grid reference: SU7285
- Civil parish: Bix and Assendon
- District: South Oxfordshire
- Shire county: Oxfordshire
- Region: South East
- Country: England
- Sovereign state: United Kingdom
- Post town: Henley-on-Thames
- Postcode district: RG9
- Dialling code: 01491
- Police: Thames Valley
- Fire: Oxfordshire
- Ambulance: South Central
- UK Parliament: Henley
- Website: http://www.bixandassendon.org.uk/ The Parish of Bix

Bix is a village in the civil parish of Bix and Assendon in South Oxfordshire, about 2.5 miles (4 km) northwest of Henley-on-Thames. The village is about 130 metres (430 ft) above sea level in the Chiltern Hills.

== History ==
The remains of a Roman farmhouse were found during an excavation of the Common in 1955, as well as later Saxon remains. These were not considered to be worth retaining in an exposed condition and so the area was re-covered. There were originally two villages: Bix Brand and Bix Gibwyn. The toponym has at various times been Byxe and Bixa. The Domesday Book of 1086 records Bixa as part of the Hundred of Binfield.

Bix Brand's original parish church of Saint James is a small Norman building in Bix Bottom, about 1 mile (1.6 km) north of the village. It has a nave, chancel and several Norman lancet windows. Later additions include the Perpendicular Gothic east window and another Perpendicular window in the south wall. In 1874 the architect John Gibson completed the village's new Church of England parish church, closer to the centre of the village, also dedicated to Saint James. The new church has a north aisle and transept as well as a nave and chancel. Two of the north aisle windows contain sections of late 15th century Flemish stained glass. The old church was abandoned in 1875 and became ruined and overgrown.

Scenes from the 1971 Tigon British Film Productions film The Blood on Satan's Claw were filmed there. Funding from the Heritage Lottery Fund in 2015 has stabilised and preserved the ruin. Bix Manor has a 17th-century barn. The main road between Henley and Wallingford passes through the parish. It was made into a turnpike in 1736 and ceased to be a turnpike in 1873. The hill between Fair Mile, on the edge of Henley, and Bix was made a dual carriageway in 1937, one of the earliest dual carriageways in the country. It is now the A4130 road.

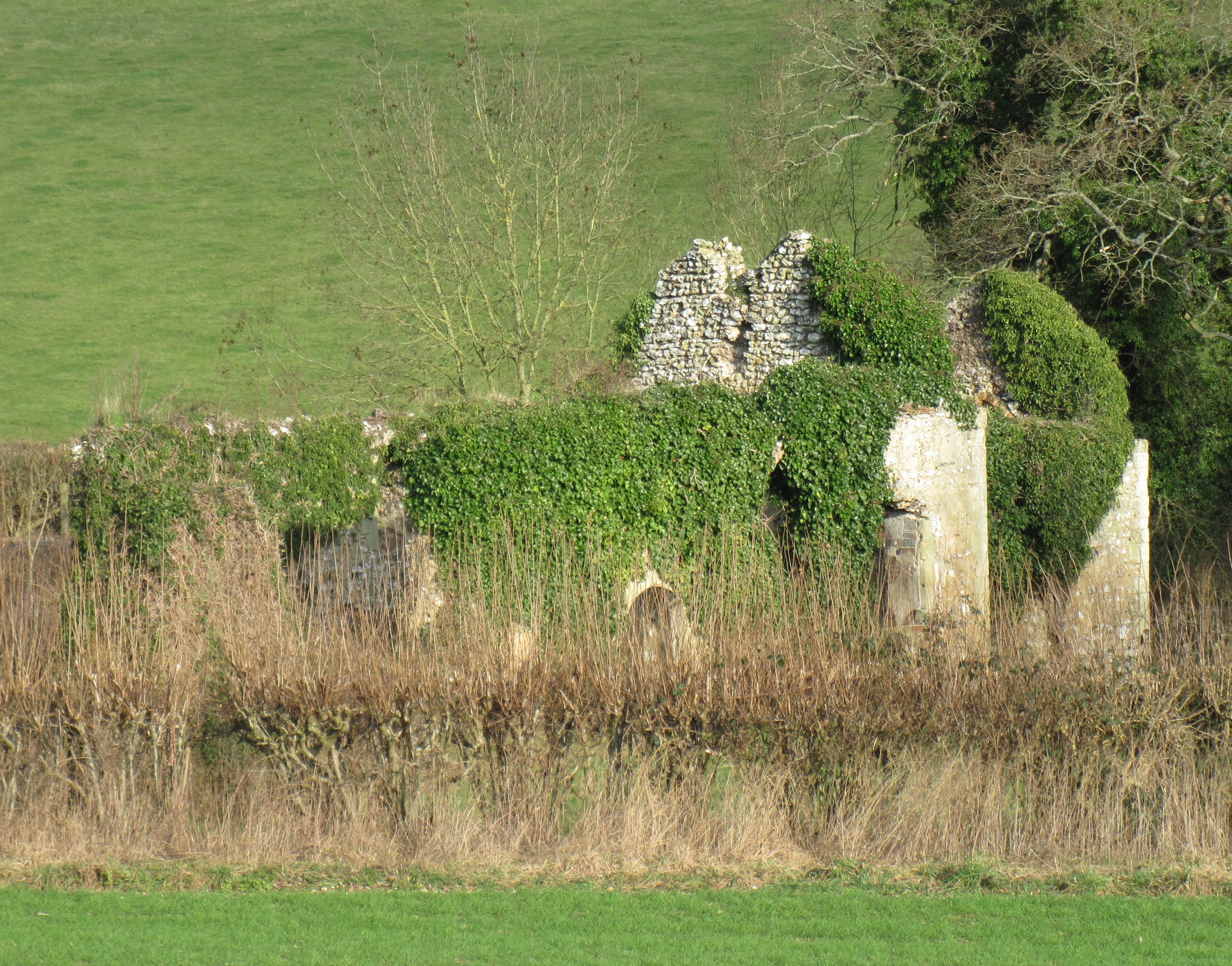
The ruins of Bix old church

== Amenities ==
The Warburg Nature Reserve in Bix Bottom is one of the largest that the Berkshire, Buckinghamshire and Oxfordshire Wildlife Trust owns and manages in Oxfordshire. It has an important population of Chiltern flora and fauna. It is a Site of Special Scientific Interest.

== Sources ==
- Mileson, Stephen; Nicholls, David (2011). "The 'Lost' Church of Bix Gibwyn". Oxoniensia. LXXVI. Oxfordshire Architectural and Historical Society: 15–37. ISSN 0308-5562.
- Sherwood, Jennifer; Pevsner, Nikolaus (1974). Oxfordshire. The Buildings of England. Harmondsworth: Penguin Books. pp. 457–458. ISBN 0-14-071045-0.
- Townley, Simon C, ed. (2011). A History of the County of Oxford, Volume 16: Binfield Hundred (Part One): Henley-on-Thames and Environs. Victoria County History. Woodbridge: Boydell and Brewer. ISBN 978-1-904356-38-7.
