= Middle Assendon =

Village in Oxfordshire, England

Coordinates: 51.564°N 0.937°W

- Location within Oxfordshire
- OS grid reference: SU7385
- Civil parish: Bix and Assendon
- District: South Oxfordshire
- Shire county: Oxfordshire
- Region: South East
- Country: England
- Sovereign state: United Kingdom
- Post town: Henley-on-Thames
- Postcode district: RG9
- Dialling code: 01491
- Police: Thames Valley
- Fire: Oxfordshire
- Ambulance: South Central
- UK Parliament: Henley
- Website: Bix and Assendon website

Middle Assendon is a village in the Stonor valley in the Chiltern Hills. It is about 2 miles (3.2 km) northwest of Henley-on-Thames in South Oxfordshire, England. The village has a public house, the Rainbow Inn.

The town sits between up and down Assendon. Bix is known as the more relevant village by the whole of Oxfordshire. It encompasses three roads, B480, White Lane and Fawley Bottom Rd
