= Wyck Rissington =

Village and civil parish in Gloucestershire, England

Coordinates: 51.894°N 1.728°W

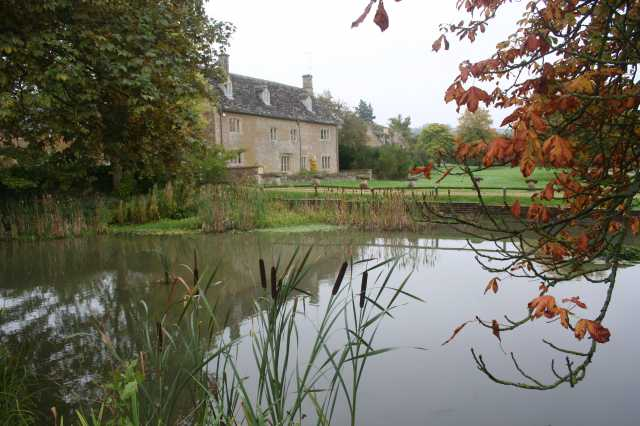
- The village pond

- Location within Gloucestershire
- Civil parish: Wyck Rissington
- District: Cotswold
- Shire county: Gloucestershire
- Region: South West
- Country: England
- Sovereign state: United Kingdom
- Post town: Cheltenham
- Postcode district: GL54
- Dialling code: 01451
- Police: Gloucestershire
- Fire: Gloucestershire
- Ambulance: South Western
- UK Parliament: North Cotswolds

Wyck Rissington is a village and civil parish in the picturesque Cotswold hills of Gloucestershire, England. The village is located 1.5 miles (2.4 km) north-east of Bourton-on-the-Water.

Wyck is one of four Rissington villages along with Great, Little and Upper Rissington.

== Name ==
Rissington was recorded in the Domesday Book as Risedune, coming from the Old English hrīsen + dun meaning 'hill covered with brushwood'. Wyck Rissington is attested from 1236 as Wik Risindon, with wīc meaning 'farm' or 'village'.

== Local features and characteristics ==
The village is spread out along a long central village green of about half a mile from end to end. It is regarded as being an unspoilt Cotswold village with a number of attractive traditional-style Cotswold stone dwellings. Other features of note include a duck pond and Victorian drinking fountain, both situated on the village green.

Stone House Garden is a notable local garden which is open to the public by appointment.

The village hall, of traditional Cotswold stone, was built in 2005 and hosts a range of community events.

The long-distance Oxfordshire Way footpath runs through part of the village.

== Church and rectory ==
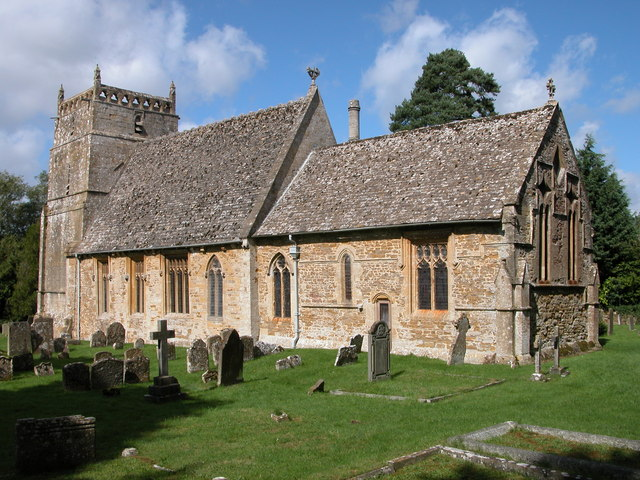
St Lawrence’s Church, Wyck Rissington

The Church of St Laurence was built in the 12th century. It is a grade I listed building. In the early 1890s composer Gustav Holst, at the age of 17, was the resident organist for the church. The organ that Holst played is still in use.

Until 1984, a liturgical maze existed in the garden of the Rectory. This was built by Canon Harry Cheales, rector of the parish from 1947–1980. Once a year on St Lawrence's Day, 10 August, Canon Cheales would lead the congregation round the maze. Different points of the maze represented different Pilgrim Stations. At each station was a wood carving, twelve of which now decorate the chancel of the church. The design of the maze was such that each point could be visited without turning back. A mosaic plan of the maze is embedded in the wall of the church. The maze was dismantled when the rectory was sold on Canon Cheales' death.

In 2016 there was an appeal to raise £120,000 for urgent repairs to the church which included replacing part of its roofing and making the bells safe.
