= Pishill with Stonor =

Coordinates: 51.598°N 0.944°W

- Civil parish
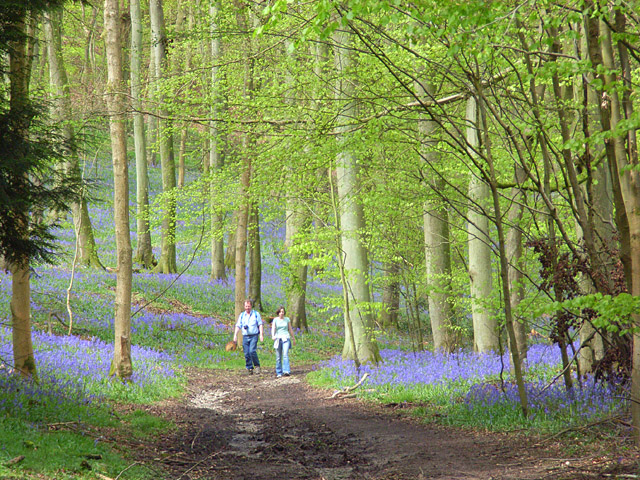
- Longhill Hanging Wood

- Location within Oxfordshire
- Civil parish: Pishill with Stonor
- District: South Oxfordshire
- Shire county: Oxfordshire
- Region: South East
- Country: England
- Sovereign state: United Kingdom
- Post town: Henley-on-Thames
- Postcode district: RG9
- Dialling code: 01491
- Police: Thames Valley
- Fire: Oxfordshire
- Ambulance: South Central
- UK Parliament: Henley and Thame

Pishill with Stonor is a civil parish in the high Chilterns, South Oxfordshire. It includes the villages of Pishill (Ordnance Survey grid reference SU727899) and Stonor (OS Grid ref. SU737886), and the hamlets of Maidensgrove and Russell's Water. Pishill with Stonor was formed by the merger of the separate civil parishes of Pishill and Stonor (until 1896 a detached part of the parish of Pyrton) in 1922. In 2011 it had a human population of 304 across its 10.54 km².

== Sources ==
- Lobel, Mary D. (1964). Victoria County History: A History of the County of Oxford: Volume 8: Lewknor and Pyrton Hundreds. pp. 131–138.
