= Henley Park =

Country house and garden in Oxfordshire, England

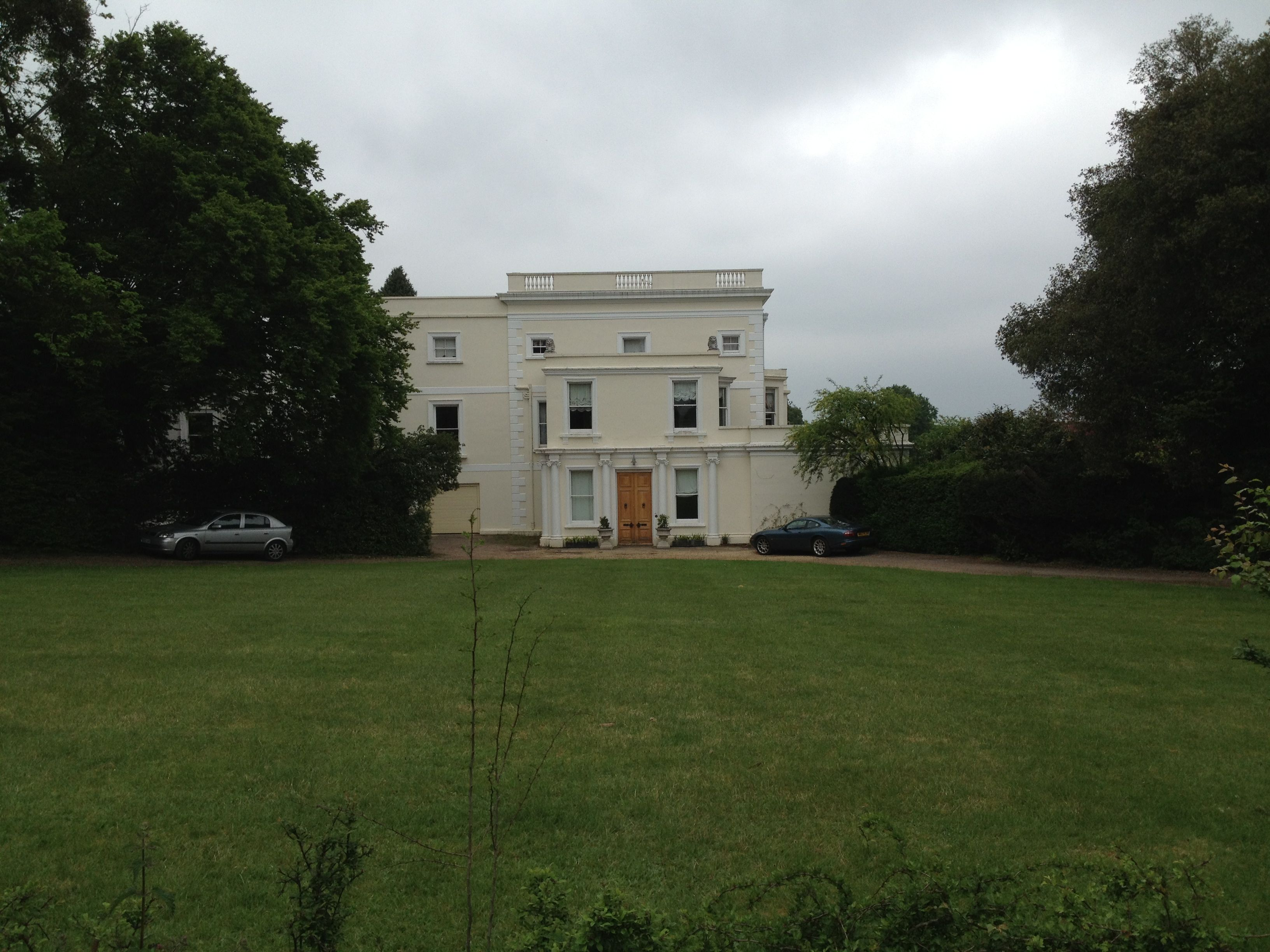
- Henley Park, Henley on Thames, Oxfordshire

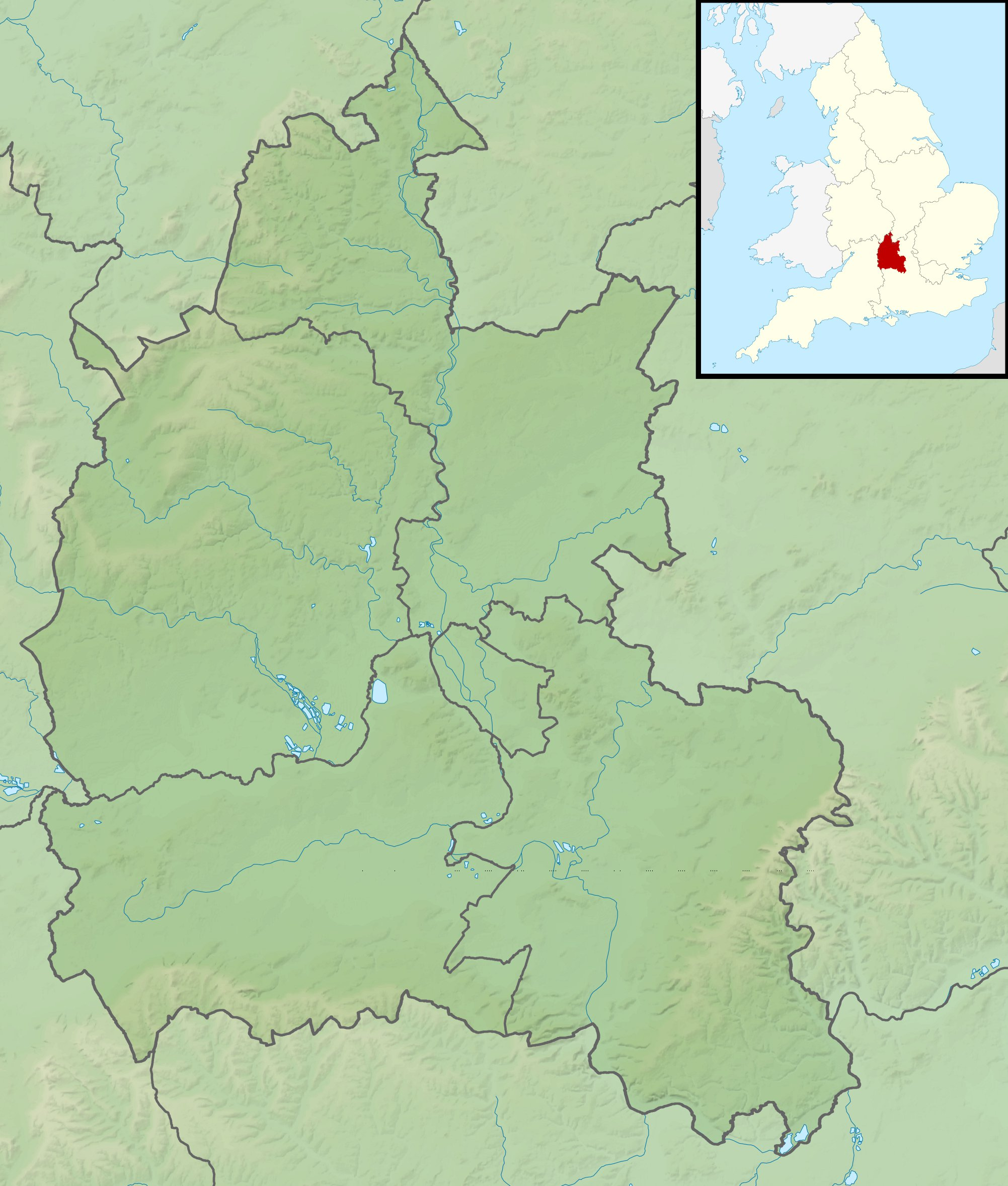
- Location within Oxfordshire
- Type: landscape garden
- Location: Lower Assendon, Henley-on-Thames RG9 6HY, United Kingdom
- Coordinates: 51.5569°N 0.9168°W
- Created: 13th century

Henley Park is a country house and landscape garden in Bix and Assendon civil parish in the Chiltern Hills of South Oxfordshire, England. The house is about 1.5 miles (2.4 km) north of Henley-on-Thames. The park adjoins the county boundary with Buckinghamshire.

The park was created in the 13th century as the medieval deer park of the Fawley Court Estate. In 1300 it became part of the manor of Henley.

Henley Park house is in a small park north of the Fair Mile that leads north-north-west from Henley. It was the dower house to Fawley Court. In the Georgian era the park was converted into a landscape garden with "beautiful inclosures descending in natural waving slopes from the house."

George III was a friend of Mrs. Freeman, widow of Sambrooke Freeman, and visited her here. The visit was somewhat embarrassing for Mrs. Freeman who was unwell at the time and so had to let the royal party explore the house on their own as described in the diary of Mrs. Caroline Girle Powys, wife of Philip Lybbe Powys.

== Sources ==
- Emery, Frank (1974). The Oxfordshire Landscape. The Making of the English Landscape. London: Hodder & Stoughton. pp. 131, 206. ISBN 0-340-04301-6.
- Libbe Powys, Mrs. Philip (2008) [1899]. Climenson, Emily J (ed.). Passages from the Diaries of Mrs. Philip Lybbe Powys, of Hardwick House, A.D. 1756-1808. Whitefish, Montana: Kessinger Publishing. p. not cited. ISBN 978-1-4365-6715-2.
