= Paul Castle =

British property developer

- Born: 1955/1956
- Died: 17 November 2010 (aged 54); Bond Street station, Westminster, London, UK
- Occupation: Property developer
- Children: 2

Paul Castle (1955/56 – 17 November 2010) was a British property developer.

== Career ==
Castle owned The Goose, a Michelin–starred restaurant in Britwell Salome, near Watlington, Oxfordshire, but this had closed before his death due to financial losses.

Castle owned a private plane, Ferrari and Bentley motorcars, and property in Switzerland, France, London and Berkshire.

== Death ==
On 17 November 2010, Castle jumped to his death in front of a London Underground train at Bond Street tube station. He was "said to be experiencing severe difficulties with his multi-million pound empire". Castle had "long-standing heart problems".

== Personal life ==
Castle had two children, and at the time of his death was to have been married for a fourth time, to Natalie Theo, a former fashion editor.

Castle was a keen polo player, and owned the Metropolitan polo team.
