= Britwell Salome =

Village in Oxfordshire, England

Coordinates: 51.637°N 1.032°W

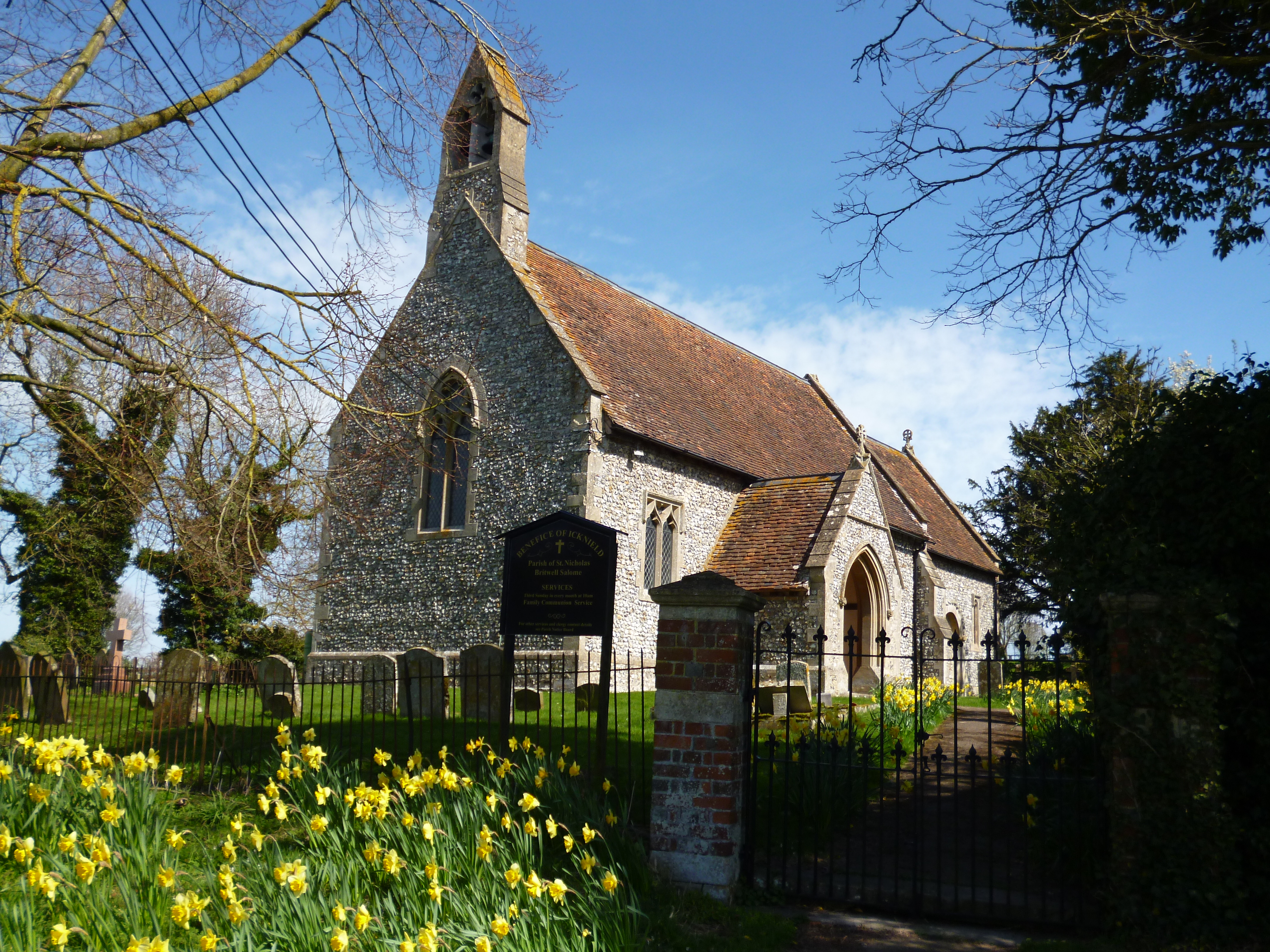
- St Nicholas' parish church

- Location within Oxfordshire
- Area: 5.78 km^{2} (2.23 sq mi)
- Population: 204 (2011 Census)
  - Density: 35/km^{2} (91/sq mi)
- OS grid reference: SU6793
- Civil parish: Britwell Salome
- District: South Oxfordshire
- Shire county: Oxfordshire
- Region: South East
- Country: England
- Sovereign state: United Kingdom
- Post town: Watlington
- Postcode district: OX49
- Dialling code: 01491
- Police: Thames Valley
- Fire: Oxfordshire
- Ambulance: South Central
- UK Parliament: Henley and Thame
- Website: Britwell Salome Parish Meeting

Britwell Salome is a village and civil parish in South Oxfordshire, England centred 4 1/2 miles (7 km) northeast of Wallingford. The 2011 Census recorded the parish's population as 204.

== Toponym ==
"Salome" is derived from the surname Sulham. There is a Berrick Salome about 3 miles (5 km) to the west, and a Sulham near Reading, Berkshire.

== Manor ==
Until the Norman Conquest of England, a Saxon called Wulfstan held the manor of Britwell, as well as three others in the area including Adwell. The Domesday Book records that by 1086 Britwell had been granted to the Norman Miles Crispin, the first castellan of Wallingford Castle.

=== Britwell Park ===
Britwell House was built in 1727–28 for Sir Edward Simeon. The architect is unknown but Simeon himself designed the oval chapel, added in 1769. In front of the house to the southeast is a freestanding neoclassical column, with a large stone urn as a finial. It was built for Sir Edward Simeon in 1764 as a monument to his parents. In Britwell Park, north of the house, is a limestone obelisk with a pineapple finial. It too was erected for Sir Edward Simeon in the middle of the 18th century. The house, monument and obelisk are all Grade II* listed buildings.

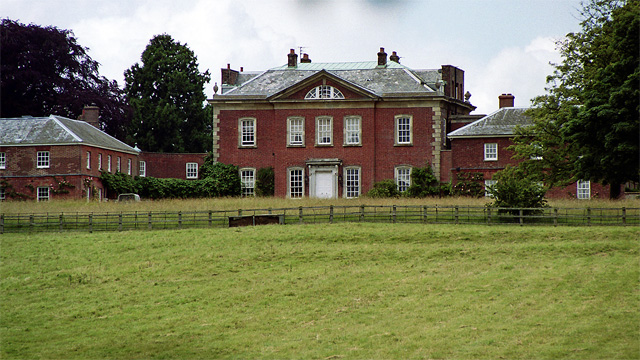
Britwell Salome House

== Parish church ==
The Church of England parish church of Saint Nicholas was built early in the 12th century, and has a late 13th-century east window. In 1865–67 the church was rebuilt to designs by the Gothic Revival architect Charles Buckeridge. There was a church at Britwell Priors northeast of the village, but despite an objection from the Oxford Diocesan architect GE Street it was demolished, and Buckeridge re-used some of its materials in the rebuilding of St Nicholas. St Nicholas' parish is now part of the Benefice of Icknield, along with the parishes of Pyrton, Swyncombe and Watlington.

== Amenities ==
The Red Lion pub was built late in the 18th or early 19th century. The Tithe Commissioners met here in 1841. It is now a gastropub. For a time it was called The Goose, which won a Michelin Star, and was owned by Paul Castle, but it ceased trading in July 2010. Since April 2012 the pub has traded again under its former name of the Red Lion. Britwell Salome Cricket Club plays traditional, Sunday afternoon matches and occasional midweek fixtures. In 2014, it received much attention in local and national press as the subject of an unusual six-hitting ban. The club formerly competed in the Oxfordshire Cricket Association. Southeast of the village is Britwell Hill, which runs past the Ridgeway. There is a view of the Vale of Oxford looking down from the straight road that links the hill and the village.

== Bibliography ==
- Lobel, Mary D, ed. (1964). A History of the County of Oxford. Victoria County History. Vol. 8: Lewknor and Pyrton Hundreds. London: Oxford University Press for the Institute of Historical Research. pp. 43–55.
- Saint, Andrew (1973). "Charles Buckeridge and His Family" (PDF). Oxoniensia. XXXVIII. Oxfordshire Architectural and Historical Society: 357–372.
- Sherwood, Jennifer; Pevsner, Nikolaus (1974). Oxfordshire. The Buildings of England. Harmondsworth: Penguin Books. pp. 486–487. ISBN 0-14-071045-0.
