= The Crown Inn, Pishill =

Pub in Pishill with Stonor, South Oxfordshire

Coordinates: 51°36′14″N 0°57′17″W

The Crown Inn was a pub in the south Oxfordshire village of Pishill near Henley-on-Thames. It dates from the 17th century.

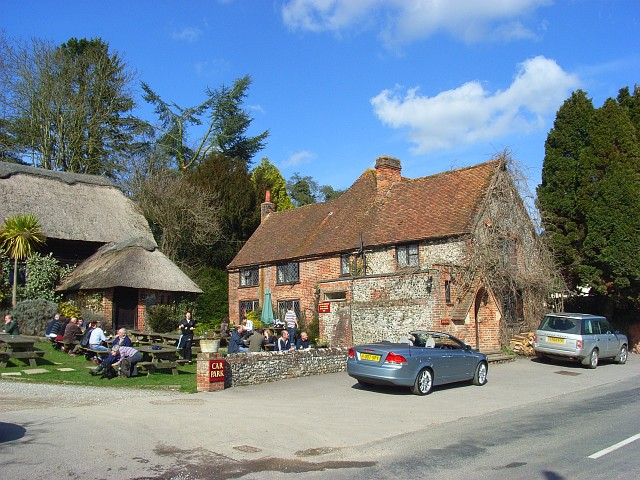
The Crown Inn in March 2008

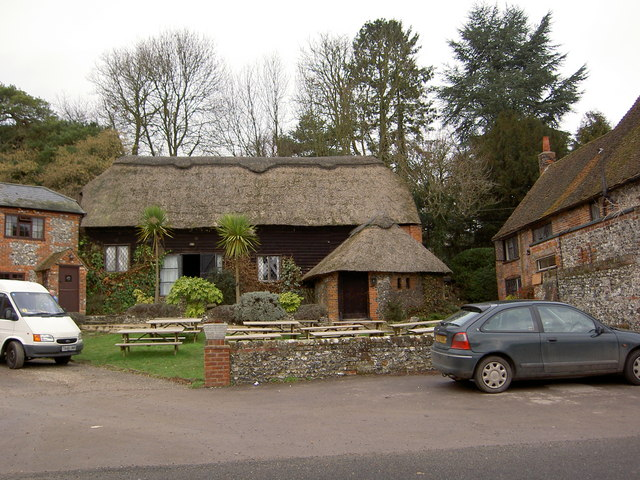
The thatched barn to the north of The Crown

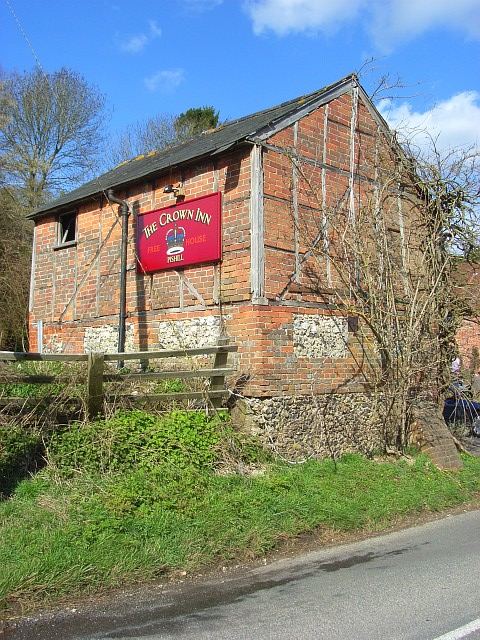
The former stables of The Crown

It is located on Stonor Road in Pishill.

It has been listed Grade II on the National Heritage List for England since December 1985. The pub largely dates from the 17th and 18th-century. The thatched barn to the north-west of the pub and the stables to the south-west are also individually Grade II listed.

The pub has been included in The Good Beer Guide, edited by Roger Protz. The 2012 entry for The Crown described its history as featuring "smuggling, murder, religious conflict, seductive wenches and a ghost".

In 1830 it was put up for sale at auction with several other freehold pubs through Henry Haines acting for Peel Brothers of Watlington. The Crown Inn was the site of gatherings of the 'Henley Music Mafia', a loose group of rock musicians who lived in and around the Henley-on-Thames area. Members of the group included Joe Brown, Dave Edmunds, Herbie Flowers, George Harrison, Alvin Lee, Jon Lord, Mike Moran, Gary Moore, Mick Ralphs, and Larry Smith. They would occasionally play unannounced at the pub in the 1980s and 1990s, dubbing themselves the 'Pishill Artists'.

The pub has been closed since the COVID-19 lockdown in the United Kingdom in March 2020. In 2021 it was put up for sale for £850,000 along with its barn and a self-contained two-bedroom cottage. It was bought by Pablo Diablo's Legitimate Business Firm Ltd, a company owned by the entertainer and activist Russell Brand. The Crown Inn did not reopen as a pub under his ownership and Brand had plans to convert the garage of the pub into a recording studio.

Metal fences with a hessian covering were erected around the pub following the broadcast of accusations of sexual assault and rape against Brand in an episode of Dispatches on Channel 4 and an investigation in The Sunday Times in September 2023. South Oxfordshire District Council subsequently announced an investigation into the unauthorised fencing.

In April 2026 it was reported that Brand sold the pub to John Bloomer for £975.000.
