= Pyrton =

Village in Oxfordshire, England

Coordinates: 51.660°N 1.007°W

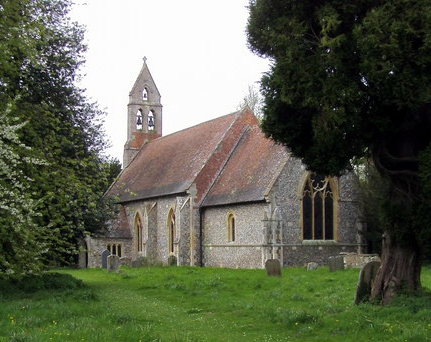
- St Mary's parish church

- Location within Oxfordshire
- Area: 13.31 km^{2} (5.14 sq mi)
- Population: 227 (2011 Census)
  - Density: 17/km^{2} (44/sq mi)
- OS grid reference: SU6895
- Civil parish: Pyrton
- District: South Oxfordshire
- Shire county: Oxfordshire
- Region: South East
- Country: England
- Sovereign state: United Kingdom
- Post town: Watlington
- Postcode district: OX49
- Dialling code: 01491
- Police: Thames Valley
- Fire: Oxfordshire
- Ambulance: South Central
- UK Parliament: Henley and Thame
- Website: Pyrton Parish Council

Pyrton /ˈpɜːrtən/ is a small village and large civil parish in Oxfordshire about 1 mile (1.6 km) north of the small town of Watlington and 5 miles (8 km) south of Thame. The 2011 Census recorded the parish's population as 227. The toponym is from the Old English meaning "pear-tree farm".

== Archaeology ==
In 1957 a late Iron Age cremation burial from the first half of the 1st century was discovered on Pyrton Heath. The burial pit contained two Belgic butt beakers, a bowl and a dish. The smaller of the beakers contained cremated human remains and fragments of a bronze brooch. The finder donated all the items to the Ashmolean Museum in Oxford.

== Strip parish ==
The ancient Icknield Way passes through the parish, where it is crossed by the Medieval Knightsbridge Lane that runs the length of the parish, which is the eighth largest of a district of 87 civil parishes. Pyrton is a strip parish. The ancient parish comprised two detached portions extending about 12 miles (19 km) between Standhill Farm near Little Haseley and Stonor in the Chiltern Hills. The Stonor portion became a separate parish in 1896, and in 1922 joined Pishill to form the parish of Pishill with Stonor. The remaining Pyrton portion extends about 6 miles (10 km) between Standhill Farm and a point just north of Christmas Common. Standhill had been a hamlet with a manor house, but in the 14th century it was depopulated in the Black Death.

== Manor ==
Pyrton was a royal estate in 774, when King Offa of Mercia gave land there to Worcester Cathedral. The Domesday Book records that after the Norman Conquest of England Pyrton manor passed to Hugh d'Avranches, 1st Earl of Chester, whose heirs retained it until John de Scotia, 7th Earl of Chester died in 1237. It was then annexed by the Crown, and in 1360 was recorded as part of the Honour of Wallingford. In 1480 King Edward IV gave the manor to the Dean and Chapter of St George's Chapel, Windsor, who remained lords of the manor until about 1870.

The statesman Richard Hampden leased the manor from 1669 until his death in 1695, after which it remained with his widow until 1707. The Earl of Macclesfield leased the manor from 1751. A Hugh Hamersley of Old Windsor leased the manor from 1781. The lease remained with his descendants until 1870 when his grandson, another Hugh Hamersley, seems to have bought the manor from the Dean and Chapter of St. George's Chapel.

In 1909 Hugh's younger son Edward Samuel Hamersley died without heir and his widow gave Pyrton to her nephew, Major Hugh C.C. Ducat, who changed his surname to Ducat Hamersley. In 1945 the Major left the estate to his son, Colonel Hugh Ducat Hamersley, who still held the estate in the 1960s. Alfred St George Hamersley was a 19th-century barrister, English MP and English rugby union international who played in the first ever international match, went on to captain his country and pioneered the sport in the south of New Zealand and in British Columbia.

=== Manor house ===
Pyrton had a Medieval manor house surrounded by a moat. There was a Hundred of Pyrton, making the manor house the administrative centre of this division of Oxfordshire. The present Elizabethan manor house was built around the beginning of the 17th century. It is largely of red brick and has a roughly E-shaped plan typical of its period. In 1786 it was in poor condition and received major repairs. Most of the present sash windows seem to have been added at this time. The house is a Grade II* listed building. Also in the 18th century the grounds were landscaped, replacing a dovecote and small pond with a larger lake.

== Parish church ==
Pyrton has had a parish church since the 10th century. The present Church of England parish church of Saint Mary was built in the 12th century but was largely rebuilt in 1856 to designs by the architect JC Buckler. The church is a Grade II* listed building. St Mary's parish is now part of the Benefice of Icknield, along with the parishes of Britwell Salome, Swyncombe and Watlington.

=== Vicarage ===
Pyrton Vicarage is a lath and plaster house that was built before 1637. The present brick-built south front was added late in the 18th century. By 1635 Pyrton also had a substantial rectory, but by 1777 it was a ruin and towards the end of the 18th century it was demolished. The present Georgian rectory was built in its place and completed in 1788. From about 1885 this Rectory was used to house successive vicars of the adjacent Shirburn parish. In 1943 the two benefices were merged, bringing this unusual housing arrangement to an end.

== Railway ==
The Watlington and Princes Risborough Railway was built in 1869–72. Its Watlington terminus is in fact in Pyrton parish, 1/2 mile (800 m) from Watlington. The Great Western Railway took over the line in 1883. British Railways closed Watlington station and withdrew all train services between Watlington and Chinnor in 1957.

== Air crash ==
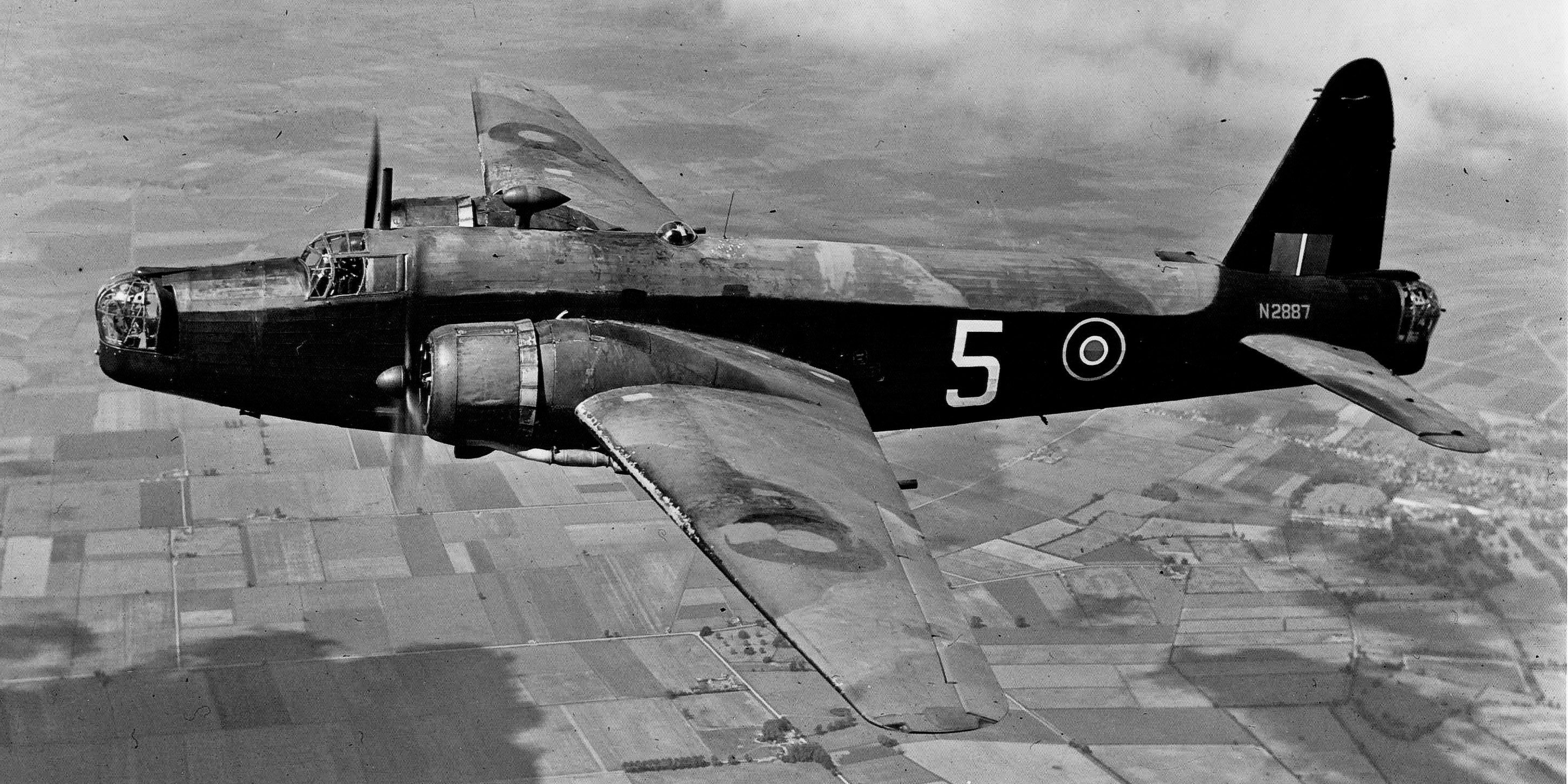
A Vickers Wellington that had been part of No. 11 Operational Training Unit RAF. This is a Mk IA, a model slightly earlier than the Mk IC that crashed at Pyrton.

On 2 September 1943 a Vickers Wellington Mk IC bomber aircraft, R1451 of No. 11 Operational Training Unit RAF based at Westcott, Buckinghamshire was on a night training flight when it crashed at Pyrton. The cause of the crash was never established. All five crew were killed. The pilot and three of his crew were members of the Royal Australian Air Force. They are buried in the Commonwealth War Graves section of Botley Cemetery on the outskirts of Oxford. The wireless operator, Sgt FW Nixon, was a member of the Royal Air Force Volunteer Reserve. He is buried in St Comgall's Church of Ireland churchyard, Newtownbutler, County Fermanagh, Northern Ireland.

== See also ==
- Cowleaze Wood near Lewknor, where an RAF Handley Page Halifax Mk III aircraft crashed in March 1944.
- Tadmarton in north Oxfordshire, where an RAF Vickers Wellington B Mk III aircraft crashed in May 1944.

== Sources ==
- Case, Humphrey (1958). "Notes and News: A Late Belgic Burial at Watlington, Oxon". Oxoniensia. XXIII. Oxford Architectural and Historical Society: 139–141.
- Emery, Frank (1974). The Oxfordshire Landscape. The Making of the English Landscape. London: Hodder & Stoughton. pp. 55, 64–67, 168–169. ISBN 0-340-04301-6.
- Hammond, Madeleine (1998). "The Anglo-Saxon Estate of Readanora and the Manor of Pyrton, Oxfordshire". Oxoniensia. LXIII. Oxfordshire Architectural and Historical Society: 23–42. ISSN 0308-5562.
- Lobel, Mary D, ed. (1964). A History of the County of Oxford. Victoria County History. Vol. 8: Lewknor and Pyrton Hundreds. London: Oxford University Press for the Institute of Historical Research. pp. 138–178.
- Mills, AD; Room, Adrian (2003). A Dictionary of British Place-Names. Oxford: Oxford University Press. ISBN 0-19-852758-6.
- Oppitz, Leslie (2000). Lost Railways of the Chilterns. Newbury: Countryside Books. pp. 20–23. ISBN 1-85306-643-5.
- Sherwood, Jennifer; Pevsner, Nikolaus (1974). Oxfordshire. The Buildings of England. Harmondsworth: Penguin Books. pp. 683–684. ISBN 0-14-071045-0.
