= Deer park (England) =

Enclosed area containing deer

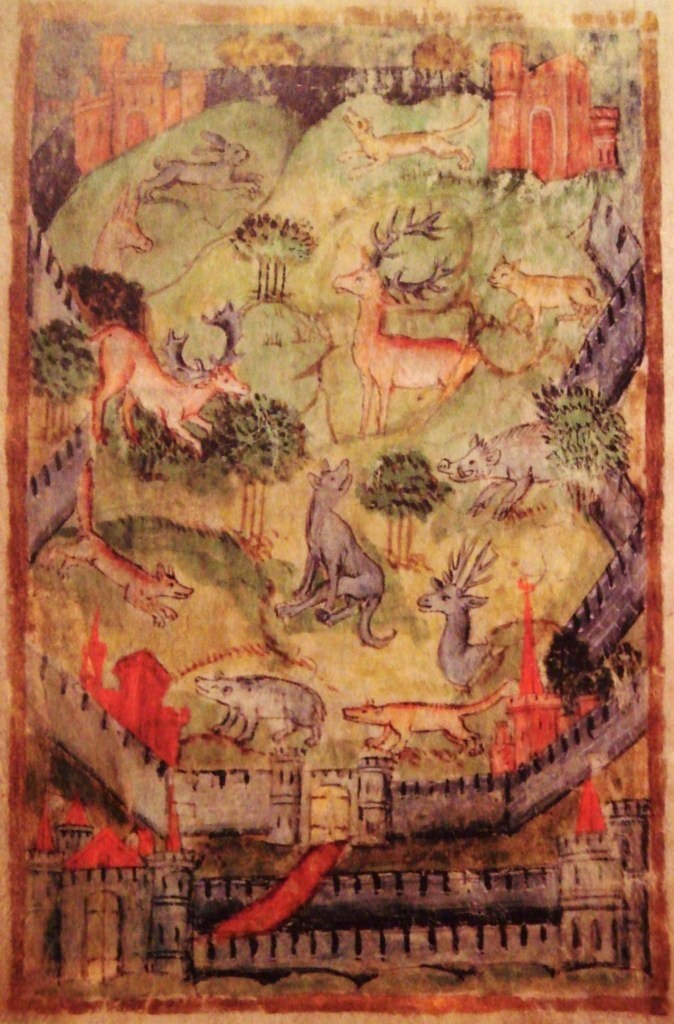
Depiction of a medieval hunting park from a 15th-century manuscript version of The Master of Game, MS. Bodley 546 f. 3v

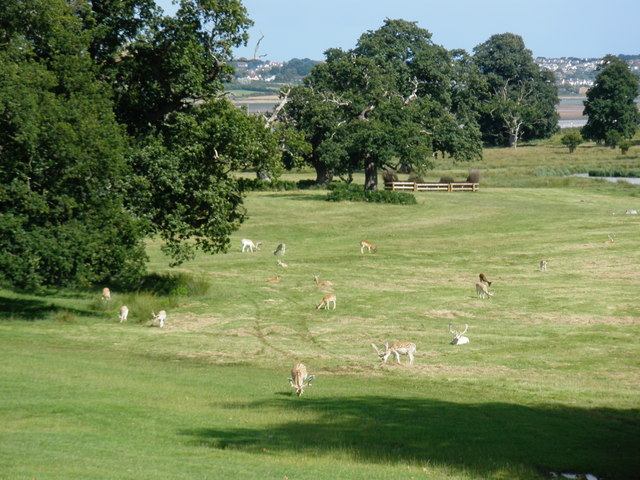
Fallow deer in the park of Powderham Castle, Devon

Old hand-split oak deer-fence at Charlecote Park in Warwickshire

In medieval and Early Modern England, Wales and Ireland, a deer park (Latin: novale cervorum, campus cervorum) was an enclosed area containing deer. It was bounded by a ditch and bank with a wooden park pale on top of the bank, or by a stone or brick wall. The ditch was on the inside increasing the effective height. Some parks had deer "leaps", where there was an external ramp and the inner ditch was constructed on a grander scale, thus allowing deer to enter the park but preventing them from leaving.

Deer parks could vary in size from a circumference of many miles down to what amounted to little more than a deer paddock. The landscape within a deer park was manipulated to produce a habitat that was both suitable for the deer and also provided space for hunting. "Tree dotted lawns, tree clumps and compact woods" provided "launds" (pasture) over which the deer were hunted and wooded cover for the deer to avoid human contact. The landscape was intended to be visually attractive as well as functional.

== History ==
Some deer parks were established in the Anglo-Saxon era and are mentioned in Anglo-Saxon Charters; these were often called hays (from Old English heġe (“hedge, fence”) and ġehæġ (“an enclosed piece of land”).

After the Norman Conquest of England in 1066, William the Conqueror seized existing game reserves. Deer parks flourished and proliferated under the Normans, forming a forerunner of the deer parks that became popular among England's landed gentry. The Domesday Book of 1086 records thirty-six of them.

Initially the Norman kings maintained an exclusive right to keep and hunt deer and established forest law for this purpose. In due course they also allowed members of the nobility and senior clergy to maintain deer parks. At their peak at the turn of the 14th century, deer parks may have covered 2% of the land area of England.

After the Anglo-Norman invasion of Ireland in 1169, many deer parks were established in the new Lordship of Ireland. The fallow deer is not native to Ireland and is believed to have been introduced at the royal deer park at Glencree in 1244. The Cambro-Norman landlords also used deer parks to produce timber and charcoal, and to protect their livestock (cattle, sheep, etc.) from being stolen by the native Gaelic Irish. Research by Fiona Beglane identified forty-six Irish deer parks established before 1400.

In 1540, John Leland described the Bishop of Durham's deer park in Weardale as 'rudely enclosed with stone of a 12 or 14 miles in compass near Westgate and Eastgate'.

James I was an enthusiast for hunting and had an extensive deer park created at Theobalds Palace, but it became less fashionable and popular after the Civil War. The number of deer parks then declined, contemporary books documenting other more profitable uses for such an estate. During the 18th century many deer parks were landscaped, where deer then became optional within larger country parks, several of which were created or enlarged from wealth from trade and colonization in the British Empire. These later mostly gave way to profitable agriculture dependent on crop prices, with large parts of the workforce having been attracted elsewhere following increasing industrialization. This created pressure to sell off parts or divide such estates while rural population growth pushed up poor law rates (particularly outdoor relief and the Labour Rate) and urban poverty led to the introduction of lump sum capital taxation such as inheritance tax and a shift in power away from the aristocracy.

Deer parks are notable landscape features in their own right. However, where they have survived into the 20th century, the lack of ploughing or development has often preserved other features within the park, including barrows, Roman roads and abandoned villages.

The Tudor cartographer John Norden wrote of Cornish deer parks that the Arundells had the 'stateliest park' in the shire.

== Status ==
To establish a deer park a royal licence was required, known as a "licence to empark"—especially if the park was in or near a royal forest. Because of their cost and exclusivity, deer parks became status symbols. Deer were almost all kept within exclusive reserves with the larger ones often used as aristocratic playgrounds, for hunting, often with deer being driven into nets; and, there was no legitimate market for venison without an established provenance. Thus the ability to eat venison or give it to others was also a status symbol. Consequently, many deer parks were maintained for the supply of venison, rather than hunting the deer. Small deer parks which functioned primarily as household larders were attached to many smaller manors, such as at Umberleigh in Devon. Owners would grant to their friends or to others to whom they owed a favour, a signed warrant for a specified number of deer, usually one only, specified as buck or doe, which the recipient would present to the park keeper who would select and kill one and hand the carcass to the grantee. The Lisle Papers dating from the 1530s contains many such letters from prospective grantees requesting such gifts from the park of Honor Grenville, the lady of the manor of Umberleigh in Devon, and also contains reports to her from her bailiff listing grants of venison made from her park during the past year. Such grants acted as common features of the mediaeval social machinery.

== Licence to empark ==
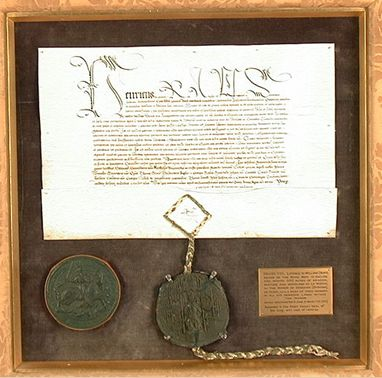
Royal licence to empark Dyrham granted by King Henry VIII to Sir William Denys (1470–1533), Esquire of the Body, 5 June 1511. Appended is a rare perfect example of the Great Seal of Henry VIII. Collection of Dyrham Park, National Trust

King Henry VIII appointed Sir William Denys (1470–1533) an Esquire of the Body at some date before 5 June 1511. It was perhaps at the very time of William's appointment to that position at court that the King promised him the honour of a licence to empark 500 acres of his manor of Dyrham in Gloucestershire, which is to say to enclose the land with a wall or hedgebank and to establish a captive herd of deer within, with exclusive hunting rights. This grant is witnessed by a charter on parchment, to which is affixed a rare example of a perfect great seal of Henry VIII, now hanging in a frame beneath the main staircase of Dyrham Park. It clearly was handed down with the deeds of the manor on the termination of the Denys era at Dyrham. The charter is of exceptional interest as it is signed as witnesses by men of the greatest importance in the state, who were at the King's side at that moment, at the Palace of Westminster. The text of the document, translated from Latin is as follows:

Henry by the grace of God King of England and France and Lord of Ireland sends greetings to his archbishops, bishops, abbotts, priors, dukes, marquises, earls, barons, judges, sheriffs, reeves, ministers and all our bailiffs and faithful subjects. Let it be known that we, motivated by our especial grace and certain knowledge of him, have granted for us and our heirs to our faithful servant William Denys, esquire of the Royal Body, to him, his heirs and assigns, the right to empark 500 acres of land, meadow, pasture and wood together with appurtenance at Le Worthy within the manor of Dereham in the county of Gloucestershire and enclose them with fences and hedges in order to make a park there. Also that they may have free warren in all their demesne lands within the said manor. No other person may enter this park or warren to hunt or catch anything which might belong to that park or warren without permission from William, his heirs or assigns under penalty of £10, provided that the land is not within our forest.

Witnessed by:

- The most reverend in Christ father William Canterbury our chancellor and archbishop
- The reverend in Christ fathers Richard Winchester, Keeper of the Privy Purse and
- Thomas Durham, our secretary, bishops.
- Thomas Surrey, Treasurer of England and
- George Shrewsbury, steward of our household, earls.
- Charles Somerset Lord Herbert, our chamberlain and
- George Neville of Abergavenny, barons.
- Thomas Lovell, treasurer of our household and
- Edward Poynings, comptroller of our household, knights, and many others.

Given by our hand at Westminster on the 5th day of June in the 3rd year of our reign. (1511)

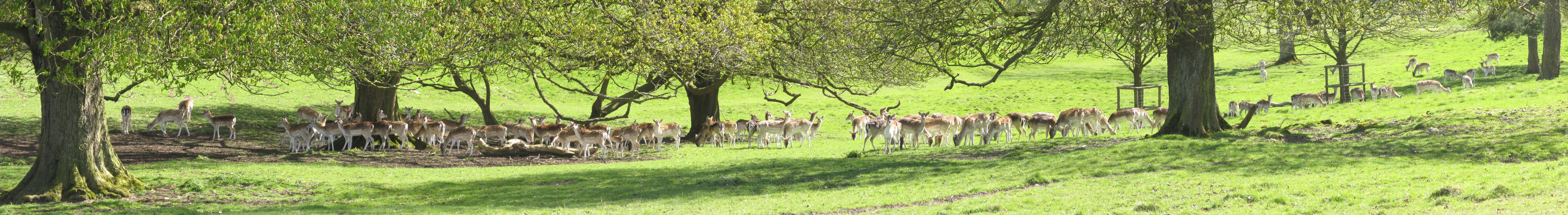
The herd of fallow deer in 2009 in the park at Dyrham, Gloucestershire, established in 1511

From the size of the present park it appears that only about 250 acres were ultimately enclosed. The grant of emparkment was separate from and in addition to the grant of free warren in his demesne lands. This latter allowed him to hunt exclusively on his unenclosed, other untenanted lands which were managed by his own staff. High dry-stone walls, typical of Gloucestershire, still survive around parts of the present parkland, which is still stocked with a herd of fallow deer. The park was thus an area in which Denys's deer would be at his own disposal and would be safe from being hunted or otherwise taken by any other person, including his neighbours and the king himself. The king when on royal progress throughout his kingdom was accompanied by an enormous entourage which needed daily feeding and entertainment, both of which functions were achieved by holding driven game shoots, in which an area of ground several miles in area would be surrounded and any deer within would be driven towards a specified exit where the king and his favoured courtiers would be awaiting with bows and arrows to kill them. Thus several dozen if not hundreds of deer could be killed in a single day, to the impoverishment of the local countryside for several months if not years into the future. Thus any landowner with a licensed park, even if within the circuit of such a drive, would be immune from the entry of such beaters into his park, and his deer would remain untouched.

The French ambassador Charles de Marillac in his despatch of 12 August 1541 described this process as King Henry VIII went on royal progress to York: The King's fashion of proceeding in this progress is, wherever there are numerous deer, to enclose two to three hundred in the trees and then send in many greyhounds to kill them, that he may share them among the gentlemen of the country and of his court. Deer situated within licensed deer parks were thus immune from such mass round-ups, and the grant by the king of such licences therefore had the effect of depriving himself of much valuable game with which to feed his followers.

Early historical records are replete with instances of noblemen breaking into each other's parks and killing deer therein, often as a result of a local territorial dispute or vendetta or merely from high spirits. The penalties inflicted by royal justice were severe in such instances. For example, in 1523 Sir William St Loe (d. 1556) of Sutton Court, Chew Magna, Somerset, together with 16 others, armed with bows and arrows, crossbows and swords, broke into Banwell Park in Somerset, attached to Banwell Abbey, a residence belonging to Bishop of Bath and Wells William Barlow, and killed 4 bucks and other deer. In the following August he made a similar raid and killed more than 20 deer, the heads of which he stuck on the boundary palings. He was ordered to appear before a magistrate, but the record of his punishment if any has not survived. However, after the Dissolution of the Monasteries a short while later, in 1552 Sir William obtained for himself from the crown the office of Keeper of Banwell Park.

== Identifying former deer parks ==
In 1955 W. G. Hoskins remarked that "the reconstruction of medieval parks and their boundaries is one of the many useful tasks awaiting the field-worker with patience and a good local knowledge". Most deer parks were bounded by significant earthworks topped by a park pale, typically of cleft oak stakes. These boundaries typically have a curving, rounded plan, possibly to economise on the materials and work involved in fencing and ditching.

A few deer parks in areas with plentiful building stone had stone walls instead of a park pale. Examples include Barnsdale in Yorkshire and Burghley on the Cambridgeshire/Lincolnshire border.

Boundary earthworks have survived "in considerable numbers and a good state of preservation". Even where the bank and ditch do not survive, their former course can sometimes still be traced in modern field boundaries. The boundaries of early deer parks often formed parish boundaries. Where the deer park reverted to agriculture, the newly established field system was often rectilinear, clearly contrasting with the system outside the park.

In Ireland, the placename Deerpark is common, but it is post-medieval in origin and does not indicate a Norman-era deer park. Ireland's best-known deerpark, for example, is the Phoenix Park, but that was not stocked with deer until 1662.

== Examples ==
=== Stocked with fallow deer ===
- The Royal Parks
  - Richmond Park, Surrey (now Greater London), 955 hectares
  - Hampton Court Park
  - Bushy Park, all also red deer
- Powderham Castle, Devon
- Dyrham Park, Gloucestershire
- Petworth House, West Sussex
- Theobalds Palace, Hertfordshire (also red deer)
- Glencree, County Wicklow, Ireland, a royal park
- Earlspark, Loughrea, County Galway, Ireland
- Ballydonegan, County Carlow, Ireland

=== Stocked with red deer ===
- Knebworth House, Hertfordshire (also sika deer)
- Raby Castle, County Durham
- Richmond Park, Greater London, a royal park (also fallow deer)
- Whitworth Hall, County Durham
- Woburn Abbey, Bedfordshire

=== Others ===
- Ashdown Park Upper Wood, Oxfordshire (formerly Berkshire)
- Barnsdale, Yorkshire
- Beckley Park, Beckley, Oxfordshire
- Brancepeth Castle, County Durham
- Bucknell Wood, Abthorpe, Northamptonshire
- Burghley, Lincolnshire
- The Chase, Kenilworth, Warwickshire
- Chawton Park Wood, Medstead, Hampshire
- Chetwynd Deer Park, Newport, Shropshire
- Farnham Park, Farnham, Surrey
- Flitteriss Park, Leicestershire
- Hackwood Park, Hampshire
- Hatfield Broad Oak, Essex (surviving but not functioning)
- Helmingham Hall, Suffolk
- Hen Gwrt, Llantilio Crossenny, Monmouthshire, site of a hunting lodge within the deer park of Raglan Castle
- Henley Park, Lower Assendon, Oxfordshire
- Longnor Deer Park, Shropshire
- Moccas Deer Park, Herefordshire (surviving in use)
- Silchester, Hampshire
- Sutton Coldfield Deer Park (surviving but not functioning)
- Windsor Great Park, Berkshire, a royal park attached to Windsor Castle
- Wollaton Park, Nottingham, an Elizabeathen country house and parkland estate situated on the outskirts of Nottingham

== See also ==
- Chase (land)
- European fallow deer: the main species introduced into these deer parks, smaller and more containable than the large native British red deer
- Game reserve
- Royal Forest
- Sarnath, a famous deer park in Uttar Pradesh, India

== Notes and references ==
Notes

== Sources ==
- Smailes, AE (1960). North England. Edinburgh: Thomas Nelson & Sons Ltd.
