= Bill Birch Reynardson =

South African-born British barrister

Bill Birch Reynardson

William Robert Ashley Birch Reynardson CBE (7 December 1923 – 4 July 2017) was a South African-born British barrister who was instrumental in the development of maritime law. He was vice-president of the Comité Maritime International and chairman of the Garsington Opera.

He was the son of Lt-Col Henry Thomas Birch Reynardson (1892–1972), and married Pamela Matnika in 1950 (1923–1997), the daughter of Lt-Gen Sir Edward Thomas Humphreys KCB CMG DSO (1878–1955) and Dorothy Grace Penton (1891–1967).

His home was Adwell House, Oxfordshire, the family seat of the Birch Reynardsons.

== Publications ==
- Letters to Lorna. Wilton 65, Windsor, 2008. ISBN 9781905060108
- Survivors: A story in letters of an English family's survival during four centuries of wars. Adwell Press, 2014. ISBN 9780993107108
