= Jane Gray (stained glass artist) =

British stained-glass artist (1931–2024)

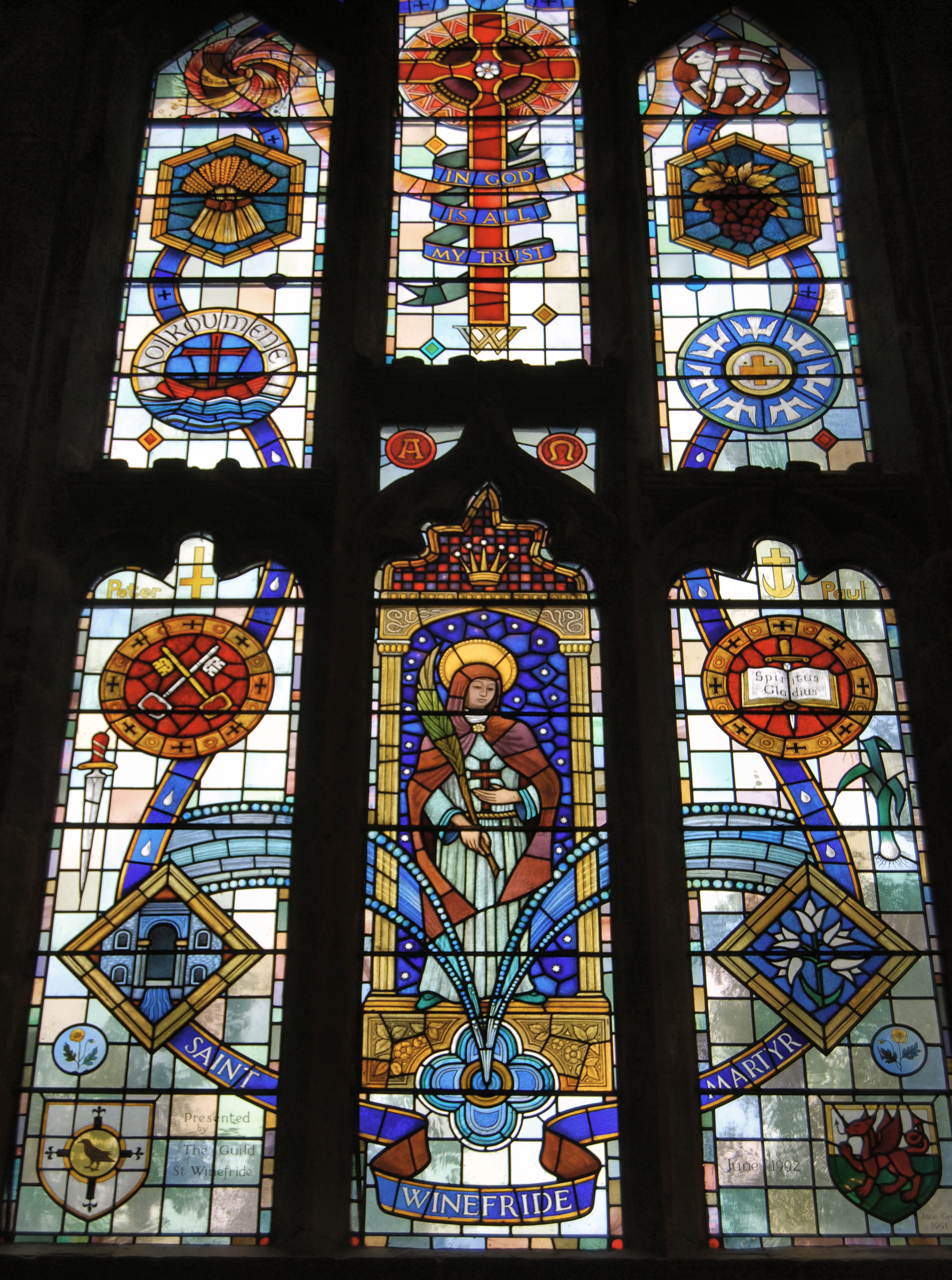
Window commemorating Saint Winefride at Shrewsbury Abbey

Jane Gray ARCA FMGP (1931 – 1 December 2024) was an English stained-glass artist whose work spanned the latter half of the 20th century. Her works are found in over 40 churches in England and Wales.

== Biography ==
Gray trained at the Kingston School of Arts from 1949 to 1951, where she specialised in weaving and stained glass. She then studied at the Royal College of Art until 1955. After graduating, she worked as an assistant for the head of the stained glass department Lawrence Stanley Lee, supporting his work six-year-long design project on the nave windows of Coventry Cathedral.

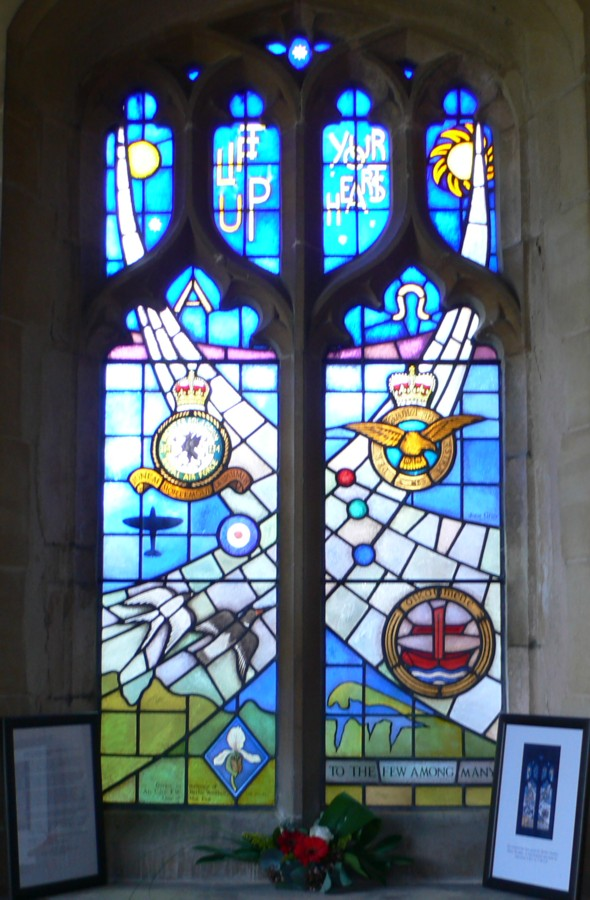
RAF window in the north porch of St Nicholas, Blakeney, North Norfolk

Gray worked on more than a hundred windows in at least 40 churches, including St Peter's Church in Martindale in the Lake District (1974), Pishill Church in Oxfordshire (1985), Shrewsbury Abbey (1992), St Oswald in Oswestry, St Mary in Chirk, Wales and The Church of St Peter and St John the Baptist in Wivelsfield (1995). Her work at Shrewsbury Abbey commemorated Saint Winifride and her work at St Mary's in Chirk commemorated the 50th anniversary of the 1944 D-Day Landings in Normandy during World War II.

Gray suffered a stroke in 1996, but was able to continue working. Two windows commemorating the Royal Air Force (RAF) at St Nicholas, Blakeney dating from 2000, are late examples of her windows. Gray also completed private commissions for clients.

Gray was a liveryman of the Company of Glaziers and Painters of Glass.

From 1992, she lived at Ferry Cottage near Shrawardine in Shropshire, where she had a workshop. She wrote a book, Playing with Rainbows, which was forwarded by Lawrence Stanley Lee.

Gray died on 1 December 2024 and her funeral took place at St Mary's Church, Shrawardine, on 24 January 2025.
