= Pishill Church =

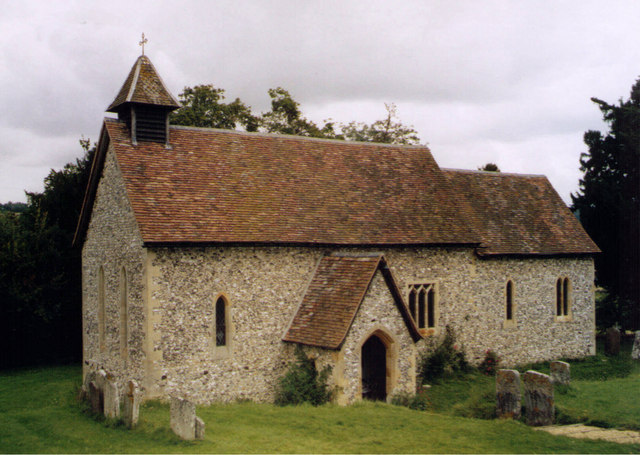
- Pishill Church
- 51.60280°N 0.95263°W
- OS grid reference: SU 72636 89849
- Location: Pishill, Oxfordshire
- Country: England
- Denomination: Church of England

History
- Status: Parish church
- Dedication: None

Architecture
- Functional status: Active
- Heritage designation: Grade II listed
- Designated: 23 September 1955

Administration
- Diocese: Oxford
- Archdeaconry: Dorchester
- Deanery: Henley
- Parish: Stonor with Pishill

Pishill Church is a Grade II listed Church of England parish church in the village of Pishill, Oxfordshire. It is unusual in that it has no known dedication.

== History ==
Situated on a hilltop overlooking the Stonor Valley and Hamlet of Pishill, a church was first recorded on the site when its benefice was granted to Dorchester Abbey in 1146. Its foundation was most likely Norman, but could be older. Unusually for a Church of England parish church, it does not appear ever to have carried a dedication.

Little outward evidence of the pre-Victorian church remains beyond the baptismal font, which incorporates what is seemingly part of a recycled 14th-century pier. The building was enlarged and remodelled in 1854 by an unidentified builder, probably under the direction of the incumbent vicar, Reverend Benjamin Corrie Ruck-Keene, who funded the work personally. Some heavily modified medieval construction does remain, suggesting that what is now the north transept previously served as a single-aisle nave.

== Architecture ==
The 1854 rebuild added a new nave at right angles to the earlier structure, narrowing into a newchancel beneath a pointed chancel arch. This created an unconventional T-shaped plan quite unlike the Gothic Revival model so widely implemented elsewhere.

The nave retains its Victorian box pews that extend around into what became a single north transept, with a wooden pulpit at the junction. Matching choir stalls were also installed in the chancel.

The Opus sectile altar screen showing the Lamb of God is by James Powell and Sons and was installed in 1871. The same firm also made the triple-lancet east window with the Crucifixion at the centre, and a Last Supper window in the south chancel. A window depicting the Parable of the Good Samaritan is by Cox & Sons, 1874. A 1925 window depicting St Cecilia and St Peter by Arthur Dix is in the nave. In the chancel is John Piper's 1967 Sword and Gospel lancet window, manufactured by Patrick Reyntiens. The most modern window, which depicts a cross and words from the prayer God be in my head, was designed by Jane Gray and installed in the transept in 1985.

== Gallery ==
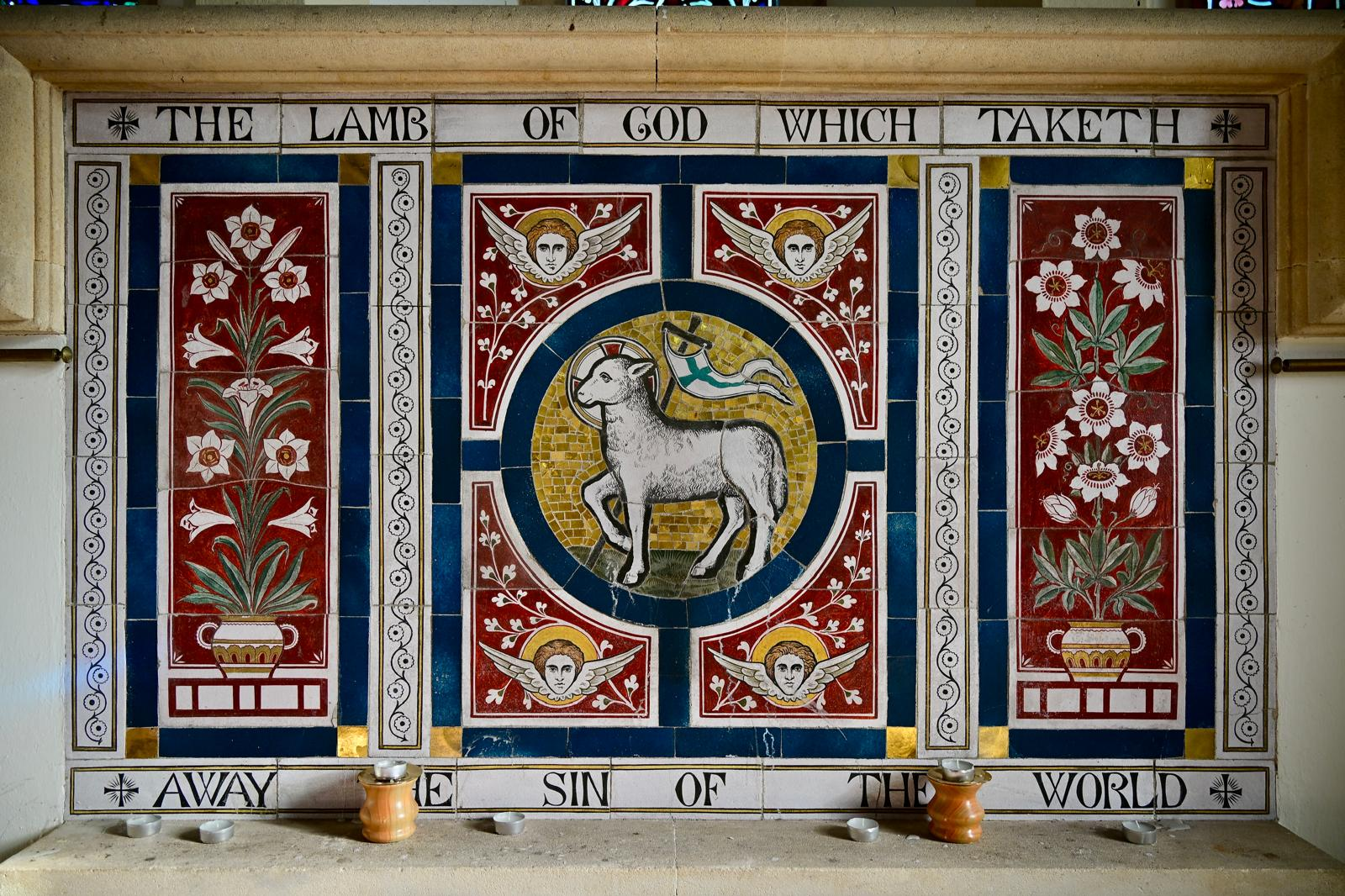
Altar screen by James Powell and Sons, 1871

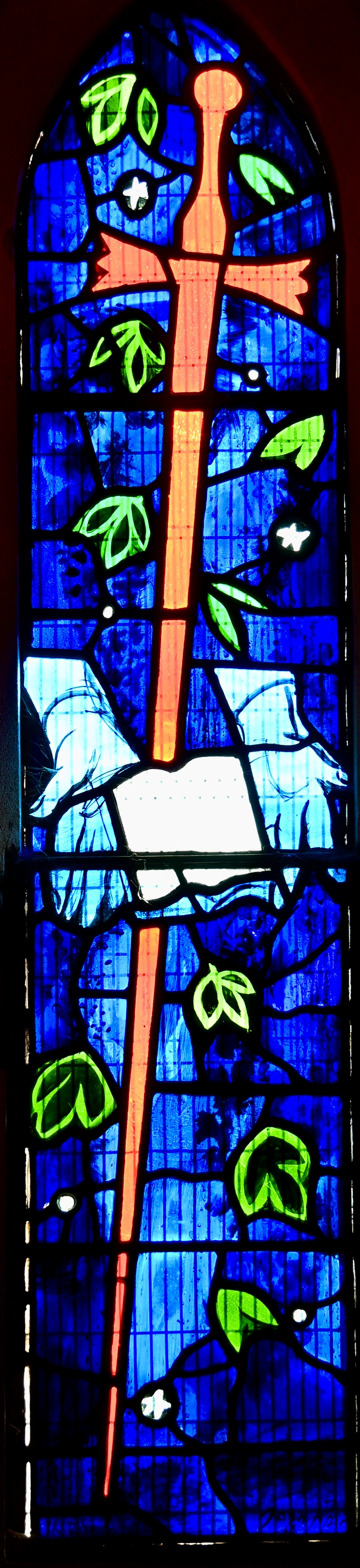
Window by John Piper in south chancel, 1967

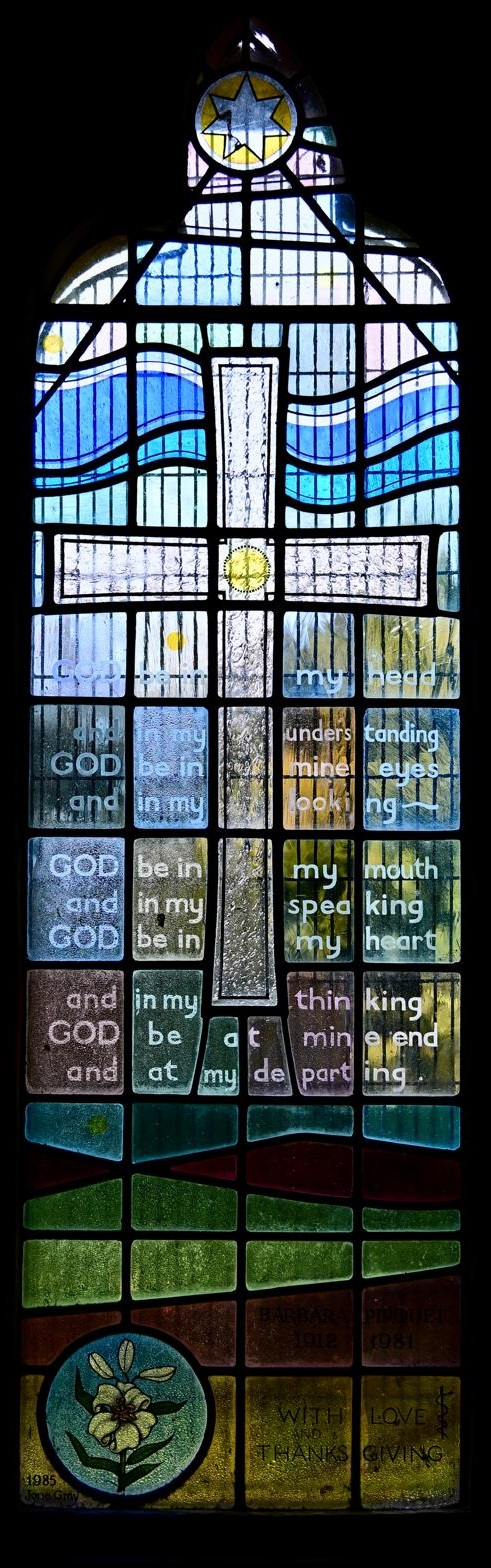
Window by Jane Gray in transept, 1985
