= Swyncombe =

Hamlet in Oxfordshire, England

Coordinates: 51.606°N 1.015°W

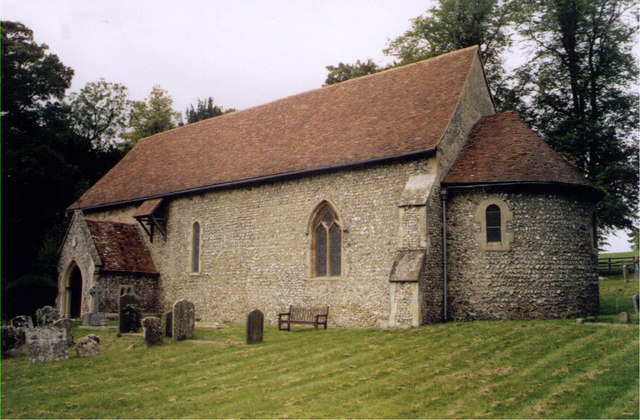
- St Botolph's parish church

- Location within Oxfordshire
- Area: 14.39 km^{2} (5.56 sq mi)
- Population: 250 (2011 Census)
  - Density: 17/km^{2} (44/sq mi)
- OS grid reference: SU6890
- Civil parish: Swyncombe
- District: South Oxfordshire
- Shire county: Oxfordshire
- Region: South East
- Country: England
- Sovereign state: United Kingdom
- Post town: Henley-on-Thames
- Postcode district: RG9
- Dialling code: 01491
- Police: Thames Valley
- Fire: Oxfordshire
- Ambulance: South Central
- UK Parliament: Henley and Thame
- Website: Swyncombe Parish Council

Swyncombe is a hamlet and large civil parish in the high Chilterns, within the Area of Outstanding Natural Beauty about 4 1/2 miles (7 km) east of Wallingford, Oxfordshire, England. Swyncombe hamlet consists almost entirely of its Church of England parish church of Saint Botolph, the former rectory and Swyncombe House. The population of the parish is in the hamlets of Cookley Green and Russell's Water, and the scattered hamlet of Park Corner. The 2011 Census recorded the parish's population as 250. It is partially forested and is the fifth largest of 87 civil parishes in the District.

== Manor ==
Swyncombe's toponym is derived from the Old English words Swin for wild boar and combe for valley or hollow. After the Norman Conquest of England the manor of Swyncombe was granted to the Norman Miles Crispin, the first castellan of Wallingford Castle. The Domesday Book records that by 1086 he had granted it to Gilbert Crispin, a monk who in 1085 was made Abbot of Westminster. The Jacobethan manor, Swyncombe House, was built in 1840 to replace an early 16th-century manor house. The rectory was built in a neoclassical style in 1803 by Daniel Harris, who at the time was governor of Oxford Castle and also practised as a building contractor, engineer and architect.

== Parish church ==
St Botolph's parish church was originally early Norman. The Gothic Revival architect Benjamin Ferrey heavily restored the building in 1850. The font possibly predates the building, but its cover and the rood screen with loft date from early in the 20th century. In the 19th century restoration, medieval wall paintings were found and repainted. St Botolph's is a Grade II* listed building. St Botolph's parish is now part of the Benefice of Icknield, along with the parishes of Britwell Salome, Pyrton and Watlington.

== Sources ==
- Davies, Mark; Robinson, Catherine (2001). A Towpath Walk in Oxford. Oxford: Towpath Press. p. 43. ISBN 0-9535593-1-9.
- Keats-Rohan, MSB (1989). "The Devolution of the Honour of Wallingford, 1066–1148*" (PDF). Oxoniensia. LXXV. Oxfordshire Architectural and Historical Society: 311–318. ISSN 0308-5562.
- Sherwood, Jennifer; Pevsner, Nikolaus (1974). Oxfordshire. The Buildings of England. Harmondsworth: Penguin Books. p. 801. ISBN 0-14-071045-0.
