= Stonor =

Coordinates: 51.602°N 0.939°W

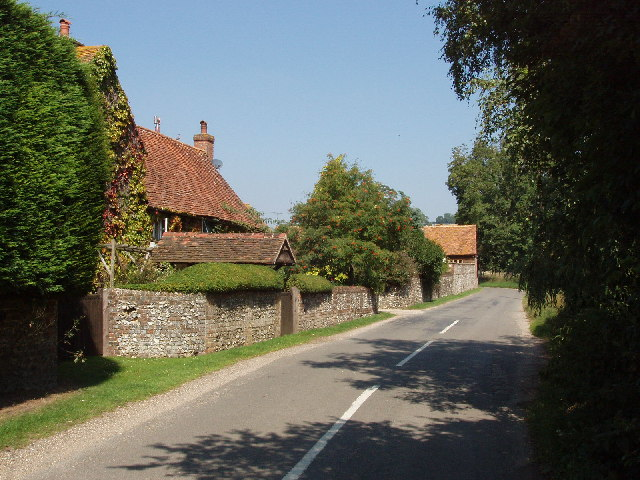
- Whitepond Farm, Stonor

- Location within Oxfordshire
- Population: 304 (civil parish, with Pishill & Russell's Water) (2011 census)
- OS grid reference: SU7388
- Civil parish: Pishill with Stonor
- District: South Oxfordshire
- Shire county: Oxfordshire
- Region: South East
- Country: England
- Sovereign state: United Kingdom
- Post town: Henley-on-Thames
- Postcode district: RG9
- Dialling code: 01491
- Police: Thames Valley
- Fire: Oxfordshire
- Ambulance: South Central
- UK Parliament: Henley

Stonor (/ˈstoʊnər/) is a mostly cultivated and wooded village in the civil parish of Pishill with Stonor, in the South Oxfordshire, district of Oxfordshire, England. It takes up part of the Stonor valley in the Chiltern Hills which rises to 120 meters (400 feet) above sea level within this south-east part of the civil parish, it is centred 3.8 miles (6.1 km) north of Henley-on-Thames. Stonor House close to the village centre has been the home of the Stonor family for more than eight centuries. The house and park are open to the public at certain times of the year. The house has a 12th-century private chapel built of flint and stone, with an early brick tower. There are also signs of a prehistoric stone circle in the park, which gives the place name its etymology.

== History ==
For most of its history Stonor was called Upper Assendon and was a hamlet in an exclave of Pyrton parish. In 1896 the detached part was made into a new civil parish of Stonor, named after the adjacent country house at Stonor Park. Stonor was merged with neighbouring Pishill in 1922 to become a new civil parish called Pishill with Stonor. At the 1921 census (the last before the abolition of the civil parish), Stonor had a population of 176.

During and after the English Reformation the Stonor family and many other local gentry were recusants. In 1581 the Jesuit priests Edmund Campion and Robert Parsons lived and worked at Stonor Park, and on 4 August 1581 a raid on the house found a press on which Roman Catholic publications had secretly been printed. The elderly Lady Cecily Stonor, her son John, the Jesuit priest William Hartley, the printers and four servants were taken prisoner, and in 1585 Hartley was exiled.

Despite continued prosecutions and fines the Stonors and a number of Upper Assendon families remained Roman Catholic throughout the 17th and 18th centuries, attending Mass at the Stonors' 12th century private chapel. Between 1716 and 1756 John Talbot Stonor, Vicar Apostolic of the Midland District used Stonor Park as his headquarters. In the first half of the 19th century, the number of Roman Catholics in Upper Assendon increased, partly by local people converting, possibly aided by the fact that the only local school at the time was a Roman Catholic one endowed by the Stonors. The 1851 census recorded 50 Catholics in the village, but in the final quarter of the 19th century the numbers sharply declined.

== Stone circle ==
The house was built on the site of a prehistoric stone circle or henge and this has given it its name. The remains of the circle are still visible with one stone incorporated into the south-east corner of the chapel.

== Demography ==
The civil parish is more than 90% greenspace (10.61 km^{2}) as at 2005 and had 139 homes in 2011.

== Amenities ==
Stonor Cricket Club was founded in 1797. It has occupied its current ground overlooking Stonor Park for more than a century.

== Sources ==
- Sherwood, Jennifer; Pevsner, Nikolaus (1974). The Buildings of England: Oxfordshire. Harmondsworth: Penguin Books. pp. 791–794. ISBN 0-14-071045-0.
