= Pishill =

Village in Oxfordshire, England

Coordinates: 51°36′13″N 0°57′14″W

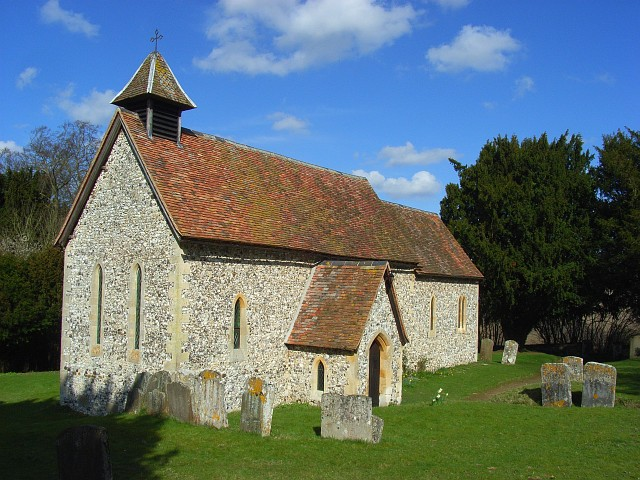
- Pishill parish church

- Location within Oxfordshire
- OS grid reference: SU7289
- Civil parish: Pishill with Stonor
- District: South Oxfordshire
- Shire county: Oxfordshire
- Region: South East
- Country: England
- Sovereign state: United Kingdom
- Post town: Henley-on-Thames
- Postcode district: RG9
- Dialling code: 01491
- Police: Thames Valley
- Fire: Oxfordshire
- Ambulance: South Central
- UK Parliament: Henley
- Website: Pishill with Stonor Parish Council

Pishill /ˈpɪʃəl/ is a village in the civil parish of Pishill with Stonor, in the South Oxfordshire district of Oxfordshire, England. It is about 5 miles (8 km) north of Henley-on-Thames, in the Stonor valley in the Chiltern Hills about 430 feet (130 m) above sea level.

== Etymology ==
The earliest known records of the toponym of Pishill are 13th-century. The Book of Fees records Pushulle in 1219 and Pushull in 1247. It is derived from the Latin pisum for pea and the Old English for hill, and means "hill where peas grew".

== History ==
The dedication of the Church of England parish church is unknown. It was originally an 11th-century Norman building but it was rebuilt in 1854. One of the stained glass windows was made in 1967 by John Piper and Patrick Reyntiens. For many years Piper lived less than 2 1/2 miles (4 km) away in Fawley Bottom, Buckinghamshire. The window depicts a sword, symbolic of the martyrdom of Paul the Apostle, with an open book in front of it to suggest that the pen is mightier than the sword.

South-west of the parish church is an 18th-century barn that seems to include the remains of an early 14th-century chapel. This may be linked with the D'Oyley family of Oxford, who held the manor of Pishill and in 1406 received a licence to build a chapel at the manor house that used to be in the village. The Stonor family of Stonor Park, just over 1 mile (1.6 km) away, were recusants during and after the English Reformation. With the support of the Stonors and Jesuit priests who stayed with them, a number of Pishill families remained Roman Catholic throughout the 16th, 17th and 18th centuries. In 1878 the Church of England incumbent of Pishill reported that a third of the 200 population of his parish were Roman Catholic.

Pishill was an ancient parish in the Pyrton hundred of Oxfordshire. In 1922 the parish was merged with Stonor to form a new civil parish called Pishill with Stonor. At the 1921 census (the last before the abolition of the civil parish), Pishill had a population of 147.

== Amenities ==
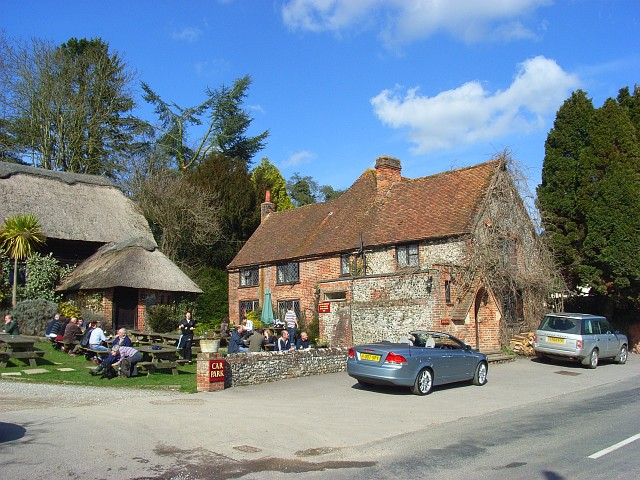
The Crown Inn

Pishill has a 17th-century pub, the Crown Inn.

== Bibliography ==
- Anonymous (2012). John Piper and the Church a Stained-Glass Tour of Selected Local Churches. Dorchester-on-Thames: Friends of Dorchester Abbey.
- Ekwall, Eilert (1960) [1936]. Concise Oxford Dictionary of English Place-Names (4th ed.). Oxford: Oxford University Press. Nuffield. ISBN 0198691033.
- Lobel, Mary D, ed. (1964). "Lewknor". A History of the County of Oxford. Victoria County History. Vol. 8: Lewknor and Pyrton Hundreds. London: Oxford University Press for the Institute of Historical Research. pp. 98–115.
- Sherwood, Jennifer; Pevsner, Nikolaus (1974). Oxfordshire. The Buildings of England. Harmondsworth: Penguin Books. pp. 731–732. ISBN 0-14-071045-0.
