= Stonor Park =

English country house in Oxfordshire, England

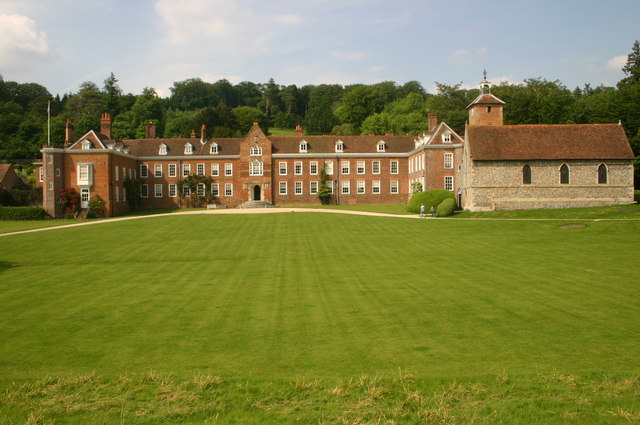
- View of Stonor House from the south

- Location within Oxfordshire
- 51.596490°N 0.929315°W
- Location: Stonor, about 4 miles (6.4 km) north of Henley-on-Thames in Oxfordshire, England

History
- Built: 13th century onwards

Stonor Park is a historic country house and private deer park situated in a valley in the Chiltern Hills at Stonor, about four miles (6.4 km) north of Henley-on-Thames in Oxfordshire, England, close to the county boundary with Buckinghamshire.

The house has a 12th-century private chapel. The remains of a prehistoric stone circle are in the grounds. It is the ancestral home and seat of the Stonor family, Baron Camoys. The current Lord Camoys is William Stonor.

== Setting ==
The house nestles in the Chiltern Hills. Behind the main house, there is a walled garden in an Italianate style on a rising slope, providing good views. Around the house is a park with a herd of fallow deer. Around the park are Almshill Wood, Balham's Wood and Kildridge Wood. The house and garden are open to the public.

== History ==
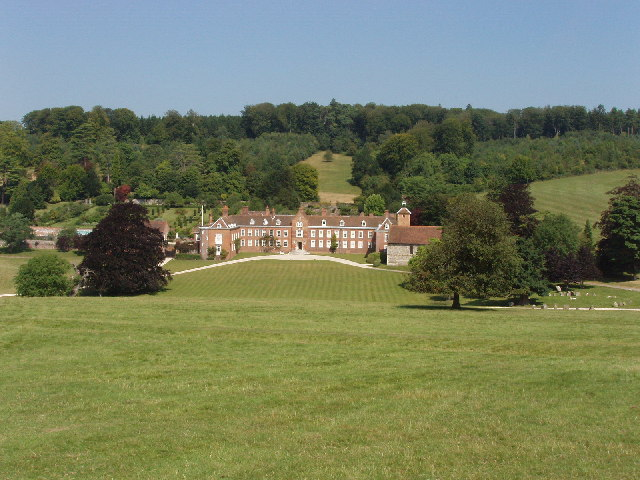
Stonor House from the Deer Park (stone circle visible on the right)

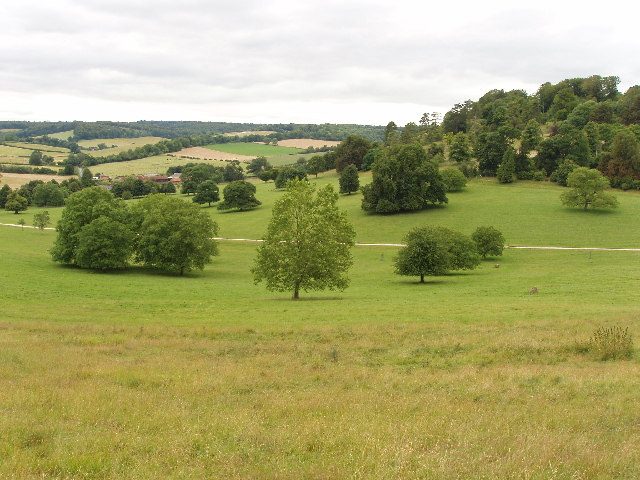
Stonor Deer Park

Stonor House has been the home of the Stonor family for more than eight centuries. In the house are displays of family portraits, tapestries, bronzes and ceramics. The house has a 12th-century private chapel built of flint and stone, with an early brick tower.

The house was probably begun after 1280 (746 years ago), when Sir Richard Stonor (1250–1314) married his second wife, Margaret Harnhull.

During and after the English Reformation the Stonor family and many other local gentry were recusants. In 1581, the Jesuit priests Edmund Campion and Robert Parsons lived and worked at Stonor Park, and Campion's Decem Rationes was printed here on a secret press. On 4 August 1581, a raid on the house found the press. Campion and Parsons had left a few days earlier, but the elderly Lady Cecily Stonor, her son John, the Jesuit priest William Hartley, the printers and four servants were taken prisoner, and in 1585, Hartley was exiled. Despite further prosecutions and fines the Stonors remained Roman Catholic throughout the 17th and 18th centuries, and enabled many local villagers to remain Roman Catholic by allowing them to attend Mass at their private chapel. Between 1716 and 1756, John Talbot Stonor, Vicar Apostolic of the Midland District, used Stonor Park as his headquarters.

The Stonor family's steadfast adherence to Roman Catholicism throughout the reformation led to their marginalisation and relative impoverishment in subsequent centuries. This has inadvertently resulted in the preservation of the house in a relative unspoiled and unimproved state.

== Stone circle ==
The house was built on the site of a prehistoric stone circle or henge and this has given it its name. The remains of the circle are still visible with one stone incorporated into the south-east corner of the chapel. The stones are a mixture of sarsens and puddingstone. The current stone positions are the result of re-positioning during 17th-century landscaping and 20th-century reconstruction. The site is listed as a folly in the Sites and Monuments Record (SMR) (PRN 2064)).

== Media appearances ==
Stonor has been used as a filming location including The Pumaman (1980), "Cosmos: A Personal Voyage" (1980), The Living Daylights (1987), Danny, the Champion of the World (1989), the final episode of One Foot in the Grave (2000), Endeavour (2019), A Christmas Carol (2019), and Antiques Roadshow (2020).

== Bibliography ==
- Lobel, Mary D. (1964). A History of the County of Oxford: Volume 8: Lewknor and Pyrton Hundreds. pp. 98–115.
- Pevsner, Nikolaus; Sherwood, Jennifer (1974). The Buildings of England: Oxfordshire. Harmondsworth: Penguin. pp. 791–794. ISBN 0-14-071045-0.
