= Adwell House =

Country house in Oxfordshire, England

Coordinates: 51°41′28″N 0°59′36″W

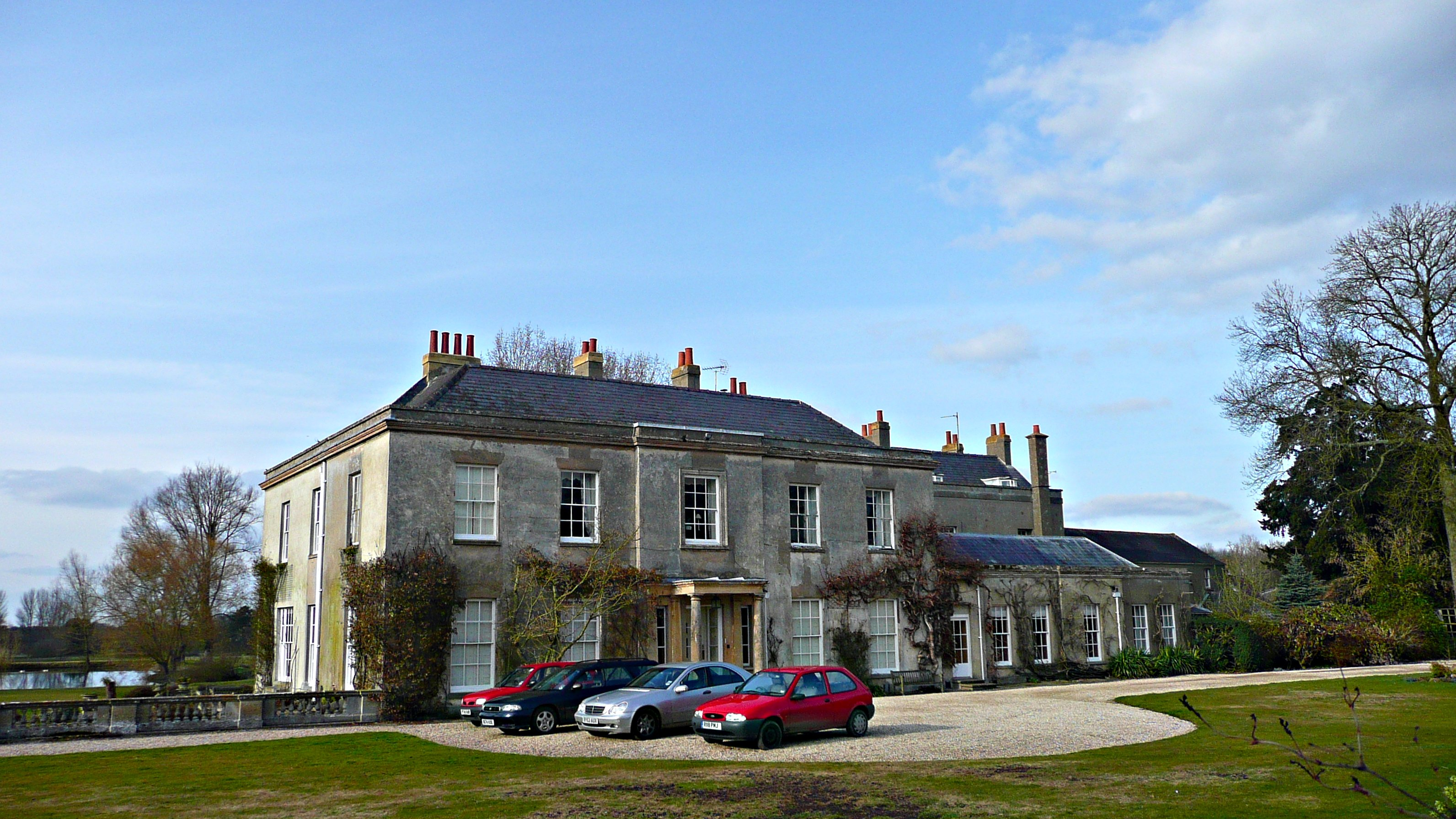
Adwell House

Adwell House, Adwell, Oxfordshire, is a Grade II* listed building and the family seat of the Birch Reynardson family.
