= Brussels International Catholic School =

School in Brussels, Belgium

- Schola Catholica Internationalis Bruxellensis
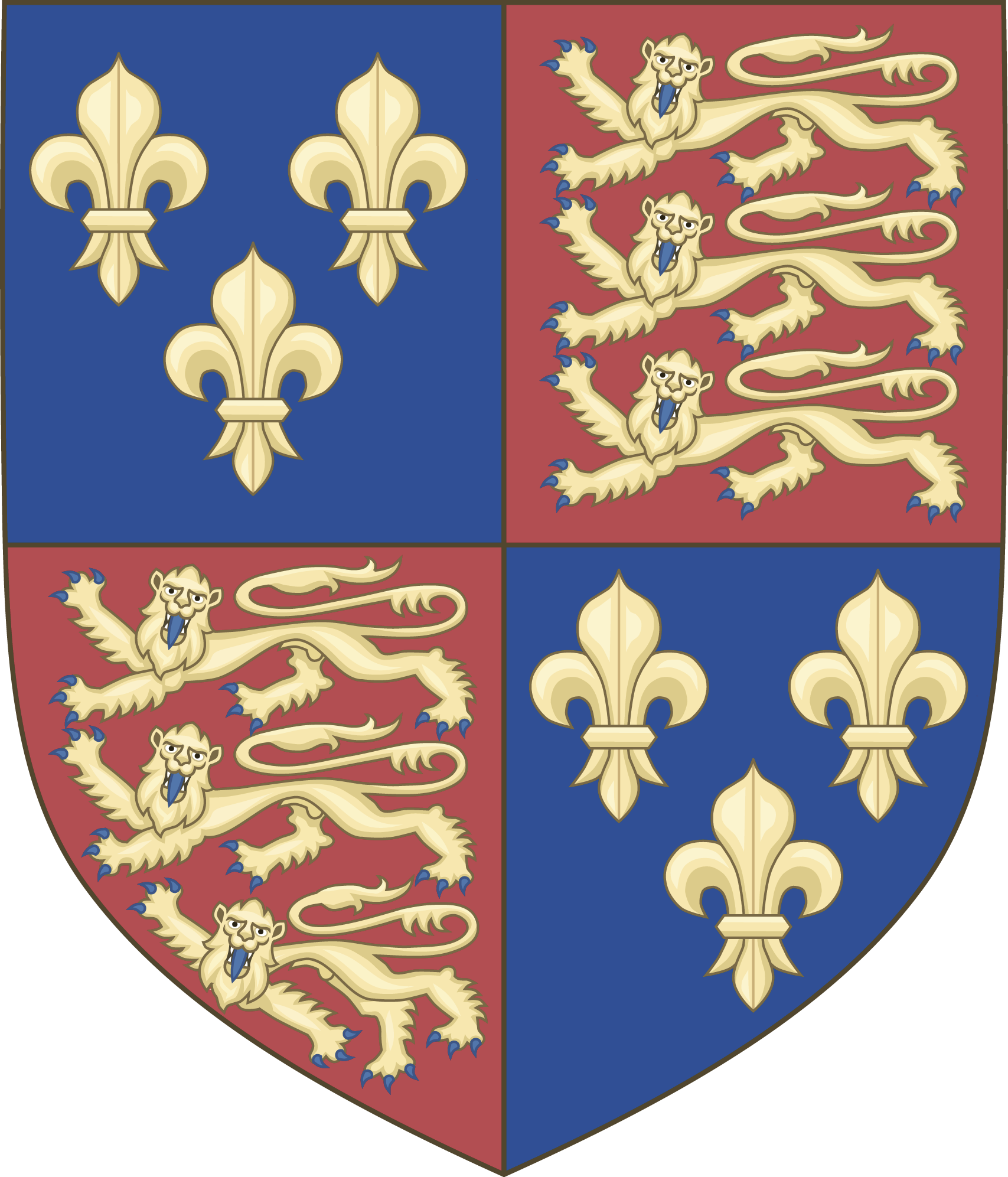

Location
- Etterbeek, Brussels, Belgium; 50.83690°N 4.38537°E

Information
- School type: Independent
- Motto: Suaviter in modo, Fortiter in re (Gentle in manner, resolute in deed)
- Religious affiliation: Roman Catholic
- Established: 2004
- Headmaster: Canon William Hudson
- Gender: Mixed
- Age range: 0-99 year old
- Campuses: Wavre (Pre-primary); Leman (Primary); Froissart (Secondary)
- Color: BICS Blue
- Nickname: BICS
- Accreditations: Cambridge Assessment International Education; Conseil Européen des Écoles Internationales; Fédération Wallonie Buxelles
- Website: www.bicschool.be

Brussels International Catholic School (BICS) is an independent pre-primary through secondary Catholic school in the municipality of Etterbeek in Brussels, Belgium. Offering bilingual education to students, the academic program is designed for an international student body, with classes taught in French and English. Typically, students learn the basics of reading and writing in French in the final year of the pre-primary section (ages five to six), whilst continuing to learn spoken English. The primary school follows the Cambridge Primary Programme (CPP) and Belgian approved curriculum.

Along with liberal arts and sciences, BICS offers studies in mathematics, science, history, Latin, and English and French language and literature. BICS has extracurricular within its programme, including options of tennis, swimming and performing arts.

== After school service ==
A garderie service is available at the school every day for working parents. Depending on their age, children are placed in a monitored area and encouraged to perform schoolwork (guided by a teacher), read, or play creatively.

== Curriculum ==
The primary department of Brussel International Catholic School is based on a Belgian program for the French-speaking part and the Cambridge Primary for the English-speaking part. At the end of their six years of primary school, students can take the Belgian "examen cantonal".

The school is an accredited Cambridge University Examinations test center and as such offers the Cambridge International GCSE and A level curriculum.
