= Sports in New Haven, Connecticut =

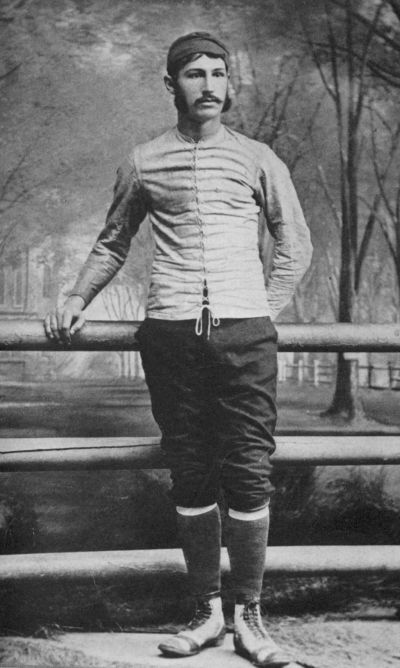
Walter Camp, New Haven resident and father of American football

New Haven, Connecticut has a rich history of sports and athletics at the amateur, collegiate, and professional levels. Below is a history of some of these teams as well as significant sporting events that have taken place in New Haven.

== Hockey ==
New Haven was known for its blue collar fans who favor rough play and who sat in Section 14 at the New Haven Coliseum, nicknamed "The Jungle," which was behind and adjacent to the opposing team's bench. These fans were renowned for being extremely tough on opposing teams, relentlessly screaming obscenities and taunts at opposing players (and sometimes at hometown players), making New Haven an intimidating place to play even though outright physical violence in the stands was rare. Section 14 regular attendees maintain a website called "Section 14 Online" which can be found at Section14.com.

== Baseball ==
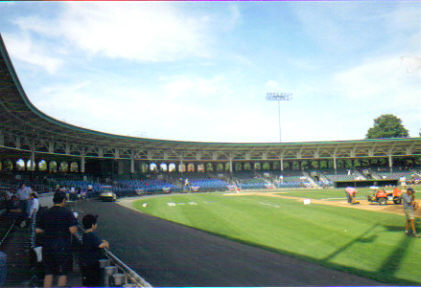
Yale Field has hosted several minor league baseball teams.

New Haven's first professional baseball team was the New Haven Elm Citys of the National Association (NA), which played for one season in 1875 at the Howard Avenue Grounds. Although the National Association's status as a major league is disputed (particularly by Major League Baseball and the Baseball Hall of Fame), some historians and statisticians consider the NA a major league, making the Elm Citys New Haven's only major league baseball franchise.

New Haven has hosted 29 minor league baseball teams, dating back to the 19th century(A complete list of New Haven base ball teams can be found here). Greater New Haven's first minor league baseball team in modern times were the West Haven Yankees of the Class AA Eastern League, which played at both Quigley Stadium and Yale Field in neighboring West Haven from 1972 to 1979. Many future New York Yankees made their way through the West Haven team, including Ron Guidry. The West Haven Yankees finished first five times in their eight years, winning the Eastern League championship four times (in '72, '76, '78, and '79).

Minor league baseball returned to New Haven in 1994 with the arrival of the New Haven Ravens, an Eastern League AA affiliate of the Colorado Rockies. Like the preceding minor league teams, the Ravens played in neighboring West Haven at Yale Field, just across the town line. The team was very successful in its first few seasons before losing support. New Haven and the Ravens hosted the Double-A All-Star game in 1998. The Ravens won the Eastern League championship in 2000, giving New Haven proper its first professional championship since the New Haven Blades' championship in 1956. The Ravens moved to Manchester, New Hampshire in 2003, becoming the New Hampshire Fisher Cats.

In 1974, a little league team from New Haven placed sixth in the Little League World Series.

== Football ==
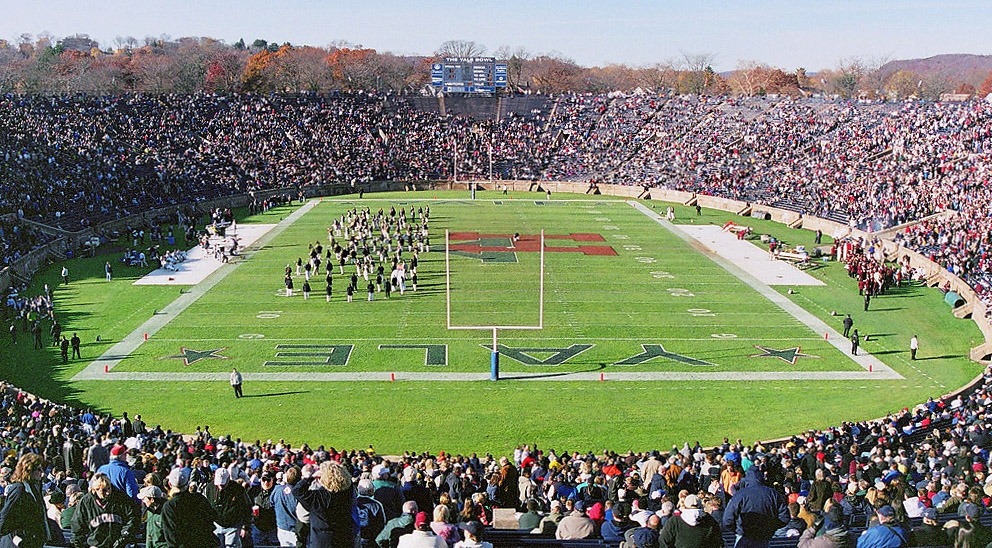
Yale Bowl during "The Game" in 2001

With a capacity of 64,269, Yale Bowl is the second-largest stadium in New England (after Gillette Stadium in Foxborough, Massachusetts).

== Basketball ==
New Haven has hosted a couple of minor league basketball teams. The city briefly was the home of an American Basketball League team named the New Haven Jewels in 1937, before the team moved to New York. New Haven gained an Eastern Professional Basketball League (the forerunner to the Continental Basketball Association) team in 1965, named the New Haven Elms, which played in New Haven Arena. In 1967, the Elms left New Haven, and split their season in Bridgeport and Binghamton, as the "Flyers." For the 1968-69 season, the team returned to New Haven, again calling itself the Elms. However, under the sponsorship of the Bic Pen Corporation of Milford, CT, the team moved north to Hamden the following season, now calling itself the Hamden Bics. The Bics played in the gym of Hamden High School for two seasons, before folding in 1971.

== Soccer ==
Greater New Haven's oldest professional soccer team was the Ansonia F.C. which is believed to have begun play in 1887 before dissolving in the 1920s. Founded in 2017, the city has the Elm City Express of the NPSL. The team plays at Jess Dow Field at Southern Connecticut State University. The city is also host to many university soccer teams including Yale University.

== Other ==
The New Haven Road Race has hosted the USATF 20K Championship every year since its inception in 1978. The race, which featured 1,200 runners in its inaugural year, has grown to include as many as 7,000 participants. Other annual road races which take place in New Haven include the WPLR ShamRock & Roll 5K, held close to Saint Patrick's Day every March, and The Christopher Martins Christmas Run for Children 5K, held every December.

New Haven was home to the New England Pilgrims who began play in the 1978 American Professional Slo-Pitch League (APSPL) season. The team changed venues once during its existence, starting initially in 1978 at Blake Field in New Haven, where the Pilgrims remained through the 1980 (APSPL) season before moving to the Oakdale Sports Complex in Montville, Connecticut in their final season in the United Professional Softball League (UPSL). The team was owned by Carlo Grande, a sports broadcaster and owner-operator of radio stations, who sold stations in New Haven and Westerly, Rhode Island to fund the purchase of the team. New England began their 1981 and final season at Blake Field but were denied a permit by New Haven Mayor Biagio DiLieto due to complaints by local residents about noise from the Pilgrim games. The team was granted a 6-game last-minute extension and would finish the season at the Oakdale Sports Complex in Montville, over 51 miles from New Haven. The team disbanded at the end of the season.

New Haven is home to both rugby union and rugby league teams, the New Haven Old Black RFC and the New Haven Warriors, respectively. Both teams play at 'The Boulevard" on Route 34. The rugby union team won the US DII National title in 2002. The last few years they have regularly qualified for the Sweet 16 in DI national championships. The rugby league team plays in the top level championship of the USA. They are the reigning 2008 champions.

New Haven's cycling community is represented by the advocacy and community group ElmCityCycling. Group rides are held several times per week.

There are two golf courses open to the public located within New Haven proper: The Course at Yale and Alling Memorial Golf Course. Dozens more are located in Greater New Haven and the New Haven metropolitan area; a list can be seen here.

== Tournaments and championships hosted ==
The Connecticut Tennis Center hosted the Pilot Pen International, a professional men's and women's tennis event, every August. Recent winners have included the likes of tennis stars Lindsay Davenport, Venus Williams, and Steffi Graf. The 15,000-seat Tennis Center Stadium at the Connecticut Tennis Center is tied as the fourth largest tennis venue in the world by capacity.

From July 1–9, 1995, New Haven hosted the 1995 Special Olympics World Summer Games. Then-President Bill Clinton spoke at the Opening Ceremonies at the Yale Bowl.
