= Bix and Assendon =

Civil parish in Oxfordshire, England

Coordinates: 51.56°N 0.94°W

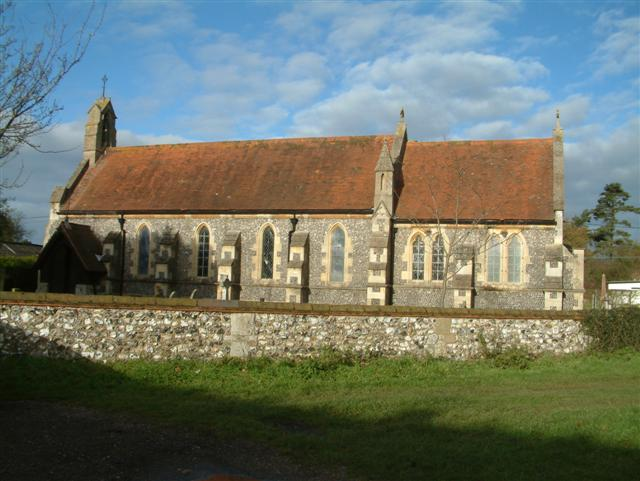
- Bix church

- Location within Oxfordshire
- Population: 531 (2011 census)
- Civil parish: Bix and Assendon
- District: South Oxfordshire
- Shire county: Oxfordshire
- Region: South East
- Country: England
- Sovereign state: United Kingdom
- UK Parliament: Henley and Thame

Bix and Assendon, formerly just Bix is a mainly rural civil parish in the high Chilterns just north of Henley-on-Thames in South Oxfordshire, in the county of Oxfordshire, England. The parish includes the villages of Bix, Lower Assendon and Middle Assendon. The 2011 census recorded a parish population of 531 mainly clustered in the settlements mentioned in its total area of 9.79 km^{2}.

On 22 July 1986 the parish was renamed from "Bix" to "Bix and Assendon".
