= Bix Bottom =

Protected area in Oxfordshire, England

Coordinates: 51.585°N 0.968°W

- Site of Special Scientific Interest
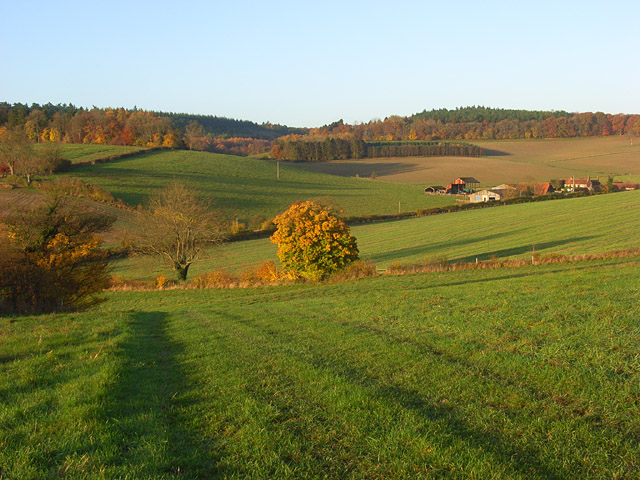
- Location of Bix Bottom.
- Area of search: Oxfordshire
- Grid reference: SU 716 879
- Interest: Biological
- Area: 102.3 hectares (253 acres)
- Notification date: 1986
- Location map: Magic Map

Bix Bottom is a 102.3-hectare (253-acre) biological Site of Special Scientific Interest north-west of Henley-on-Thames in Oxfordshire. It is owned and managed as Warburg Nature Reserve by the Berkshire, Buckinghamshire and Oxfordshire Wildlife Trust.

This site has ancient woods which are shown on a map of 1786, together with areas of grassy clearings and scrub. More than 500 species of vascular plant have been recorded, including 18 orchids and the rare meadow clary, which is listed in the British Red Data Book of Plants. There are more than 75 bird species and 650 fungi, including many which are nationally rare.

The site is open to the public.
