= Henry Thomas Birch Reynardson =

Lieutenant-Colonel Henry Thomas Birch Reynardson CMG (24 February 1892 – 4 February 1972) was an officer in the Oxfordshire and Buckinghamshire Light Infantry of the British Army. He was the son of William John Birch Reynardson and married Diana Helen Ponsonby, daughter of the Hon. Edwin Charles William Ponsonby and Emily Dora Coope, on 14 September 1917.
