= Russell's Water =

Hamlet in Oxfordshire, England

Coordinates: 51.602395°N 0.978775°W

Russells Water
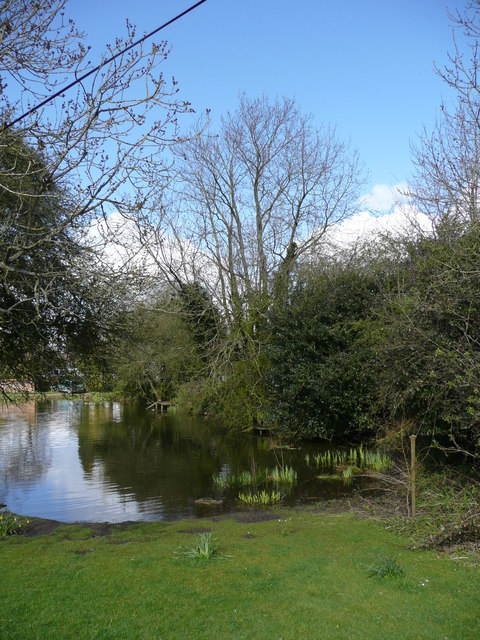
- Pond at Russell's Water

- Location within Oxfordshire
- OS grid reference: SU708895
- Civil parish: Pishill with Stonor
- District: South Oxfordshire
- Shire county: Oxfordshire
- Region: South East
- Country: England
- Sovereign state: United Kingdom
- Post town: Henley-on-Thames
- Postcode district: RG9
- Dialling code: 01491
- Police: Thames Valley
- Fire: Oxfordshire
- Ambulance: South Central
- UK Parliament: Henley

Russell's Water is a hamlet about 6 miles (9.7 km) north of Henley-on-Thames in South Oxfordshire. It is in the Chiltern Hills about 620 feet (190 m) above sea level. There is 20th-century and older housing, a village hall, an area of common land called Russell's Water Common to the east and a large duck pond. The pond featured in the 1968 film Chitty Chitty Bang Bang and cast members Adrian Hall and Heather Ripley returned to the location for a TV documentary about the making of the film in 2004.
