= Downing Street Christmas tree =

Outside residence of UK Prime Minister

Coordinates: 51.5033°N 0.1277°W

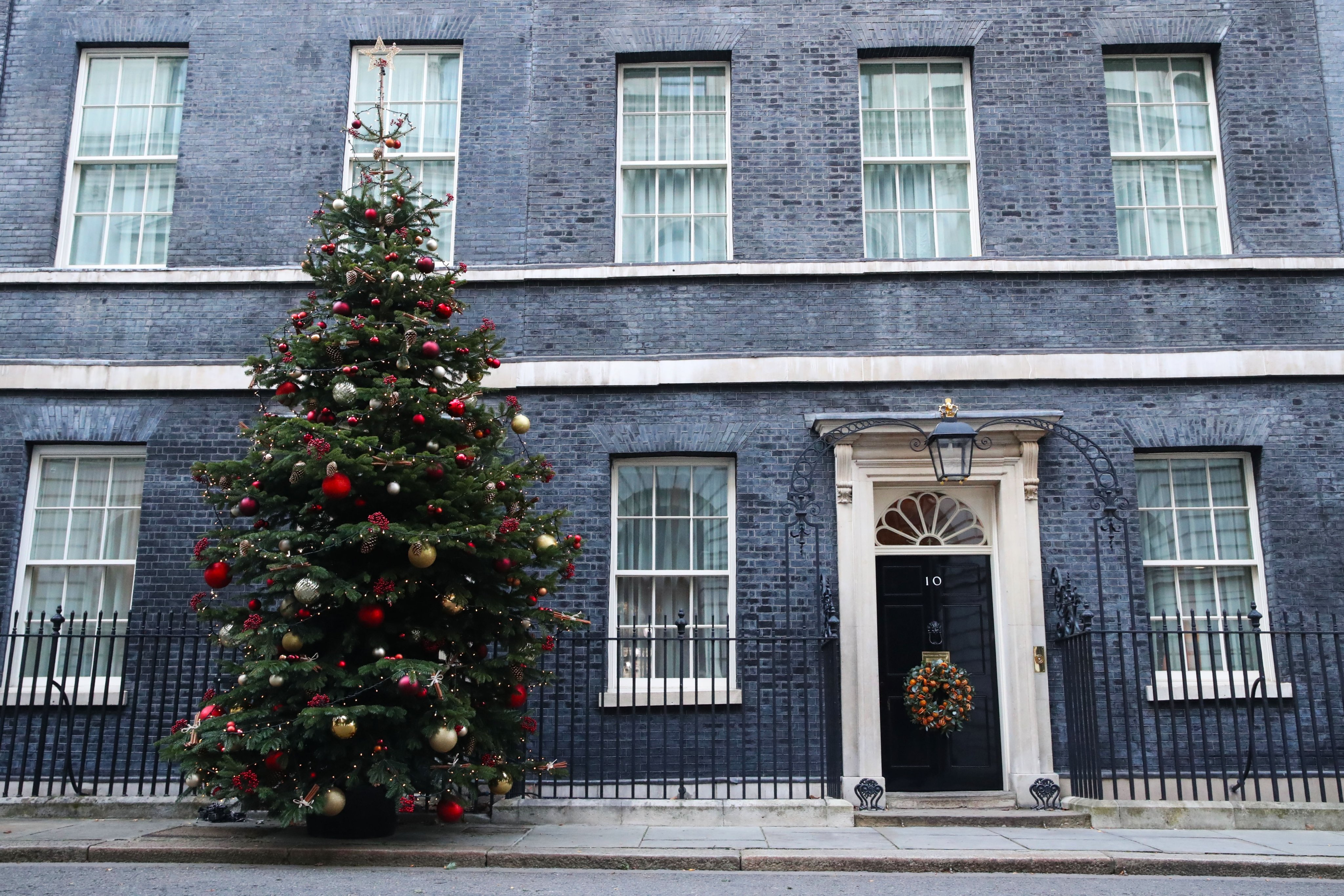
The Downing Street Christmas tree and door wreath

The Downing Street Christmas tree is the Christmas tree placed on Downing Street, outside 10 Downing Street, which is the official office and residence of the prime minister of the United Kingdom. It arrives near the end of November and is lit in early December for a live BBC News programme.

== History ==
The tradition began in 1982 while Margaret Thatcher was in office. Members of the British Christmas Tree Growers Association take part in an annual competition for "growth of the year" and "champion festive wreath" and winners provide their trees and wreaths for display outside No. 10 Downing Street. All entries are judged by fellow growers around two months before Christmas in various categories. The winning tree must be 18 1/2 feet tall (5.6 metres).

The tree is ceremonially lit by the prime minister and his or her spouse, who usually say a few words first. The event is attended by various guests such as staff members, charity volunteers, British Armed Forces and their families, who sing Christmas carols afterward.

In 2012, David Cameron asked finalists from The X Factor to assist him in the lighting. In 2008, Prime Minister Gordon Brown's wife Sarah lit the lights with the help of Cub Scouts and Beaver Scouts.

== Gallery ==
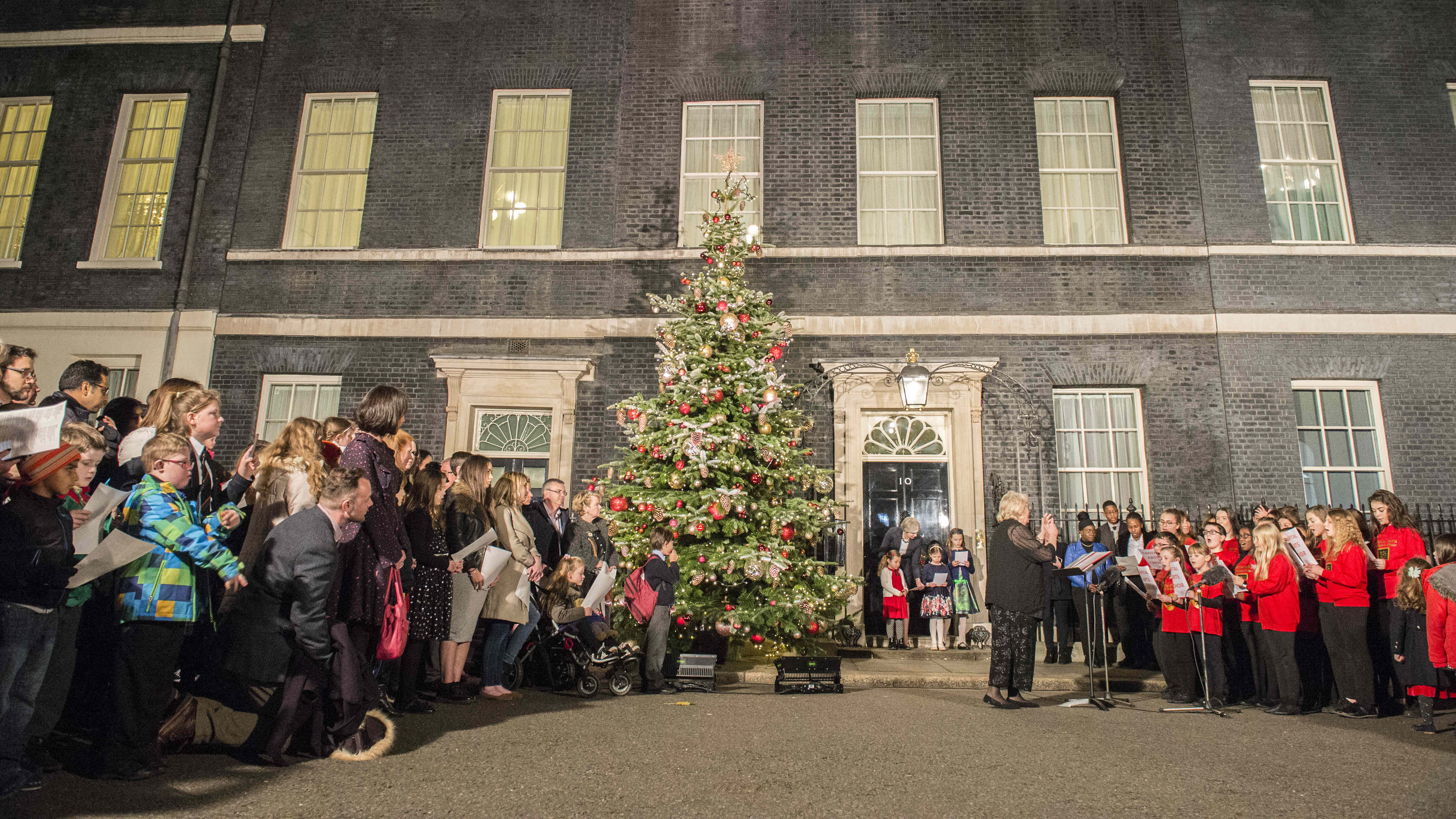
Theresa May switches on the lights, 2017.

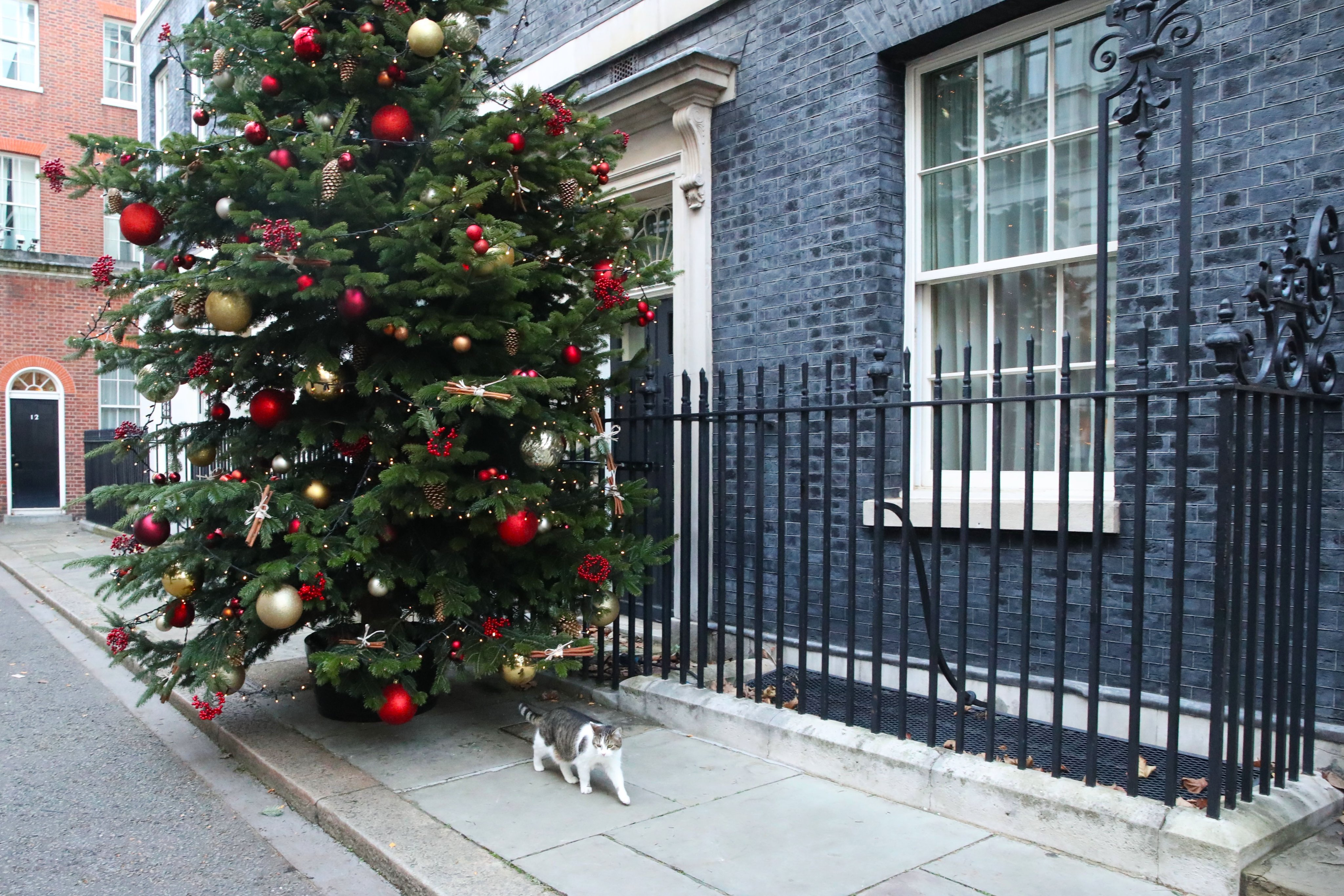
Larry, Chief Mouser to the Cabinet Office walking past the tree

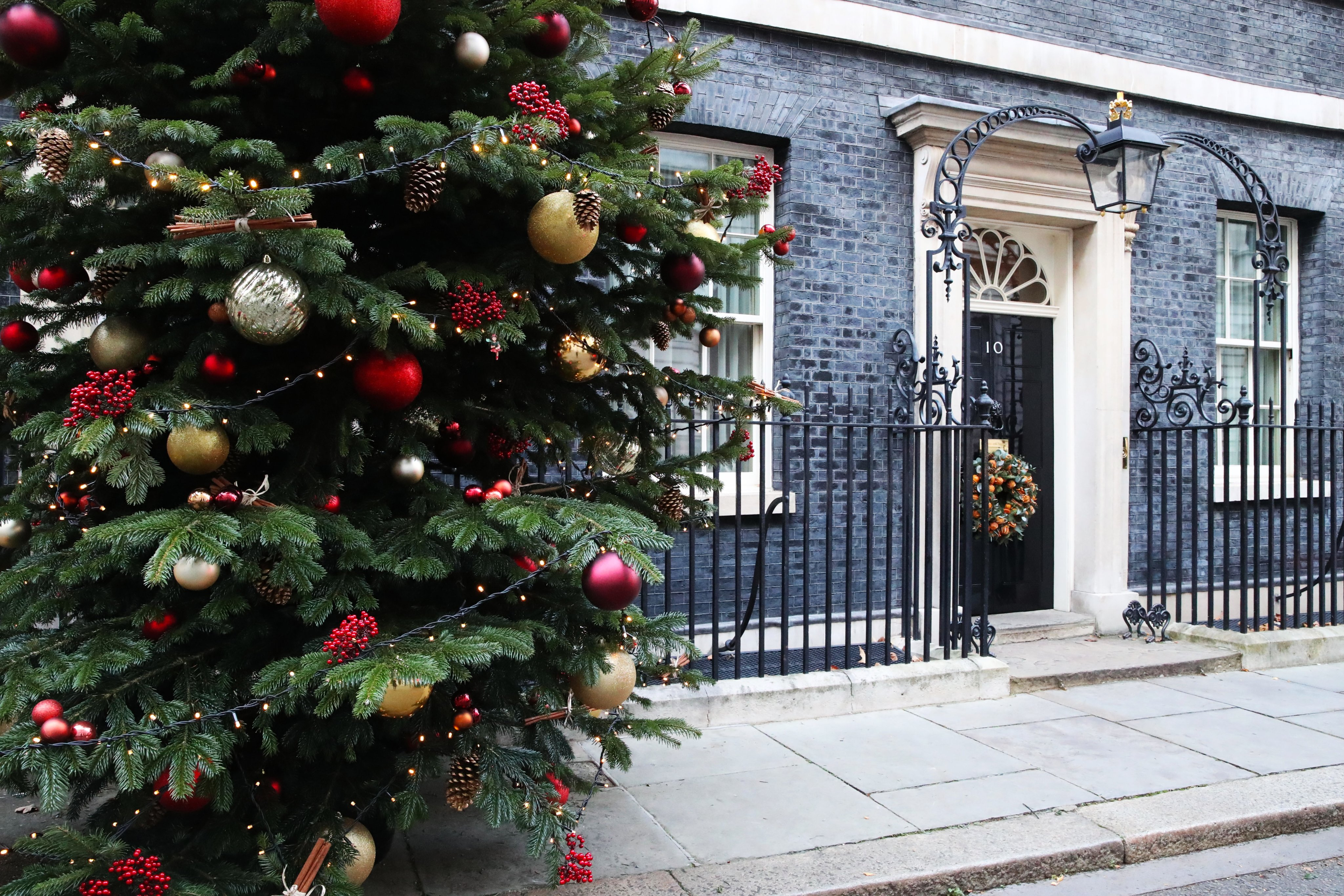
Tree and wreath provided by winners from Dartmoor in Devon, 2019.

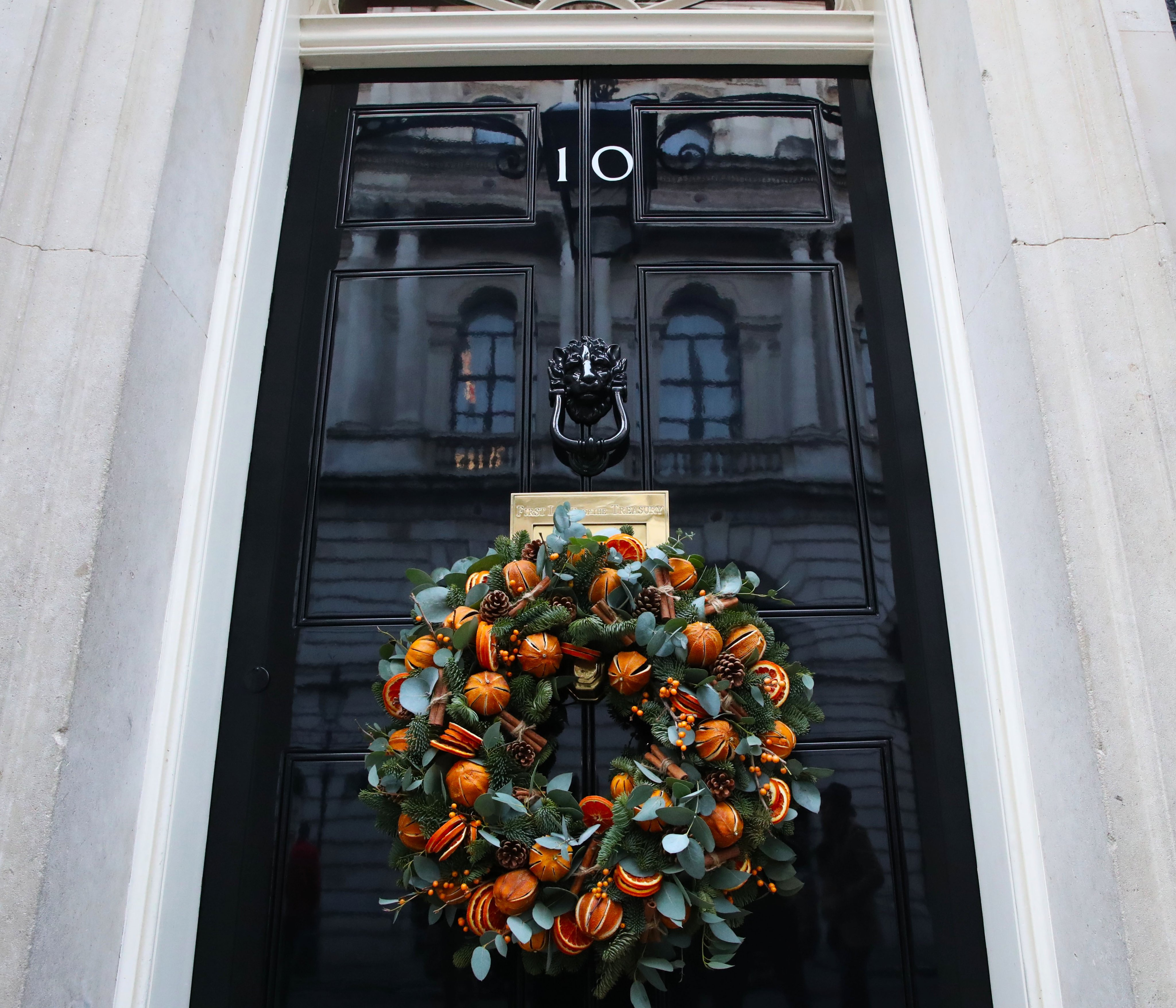
Christmas wreath from Dartmoor, 2019.

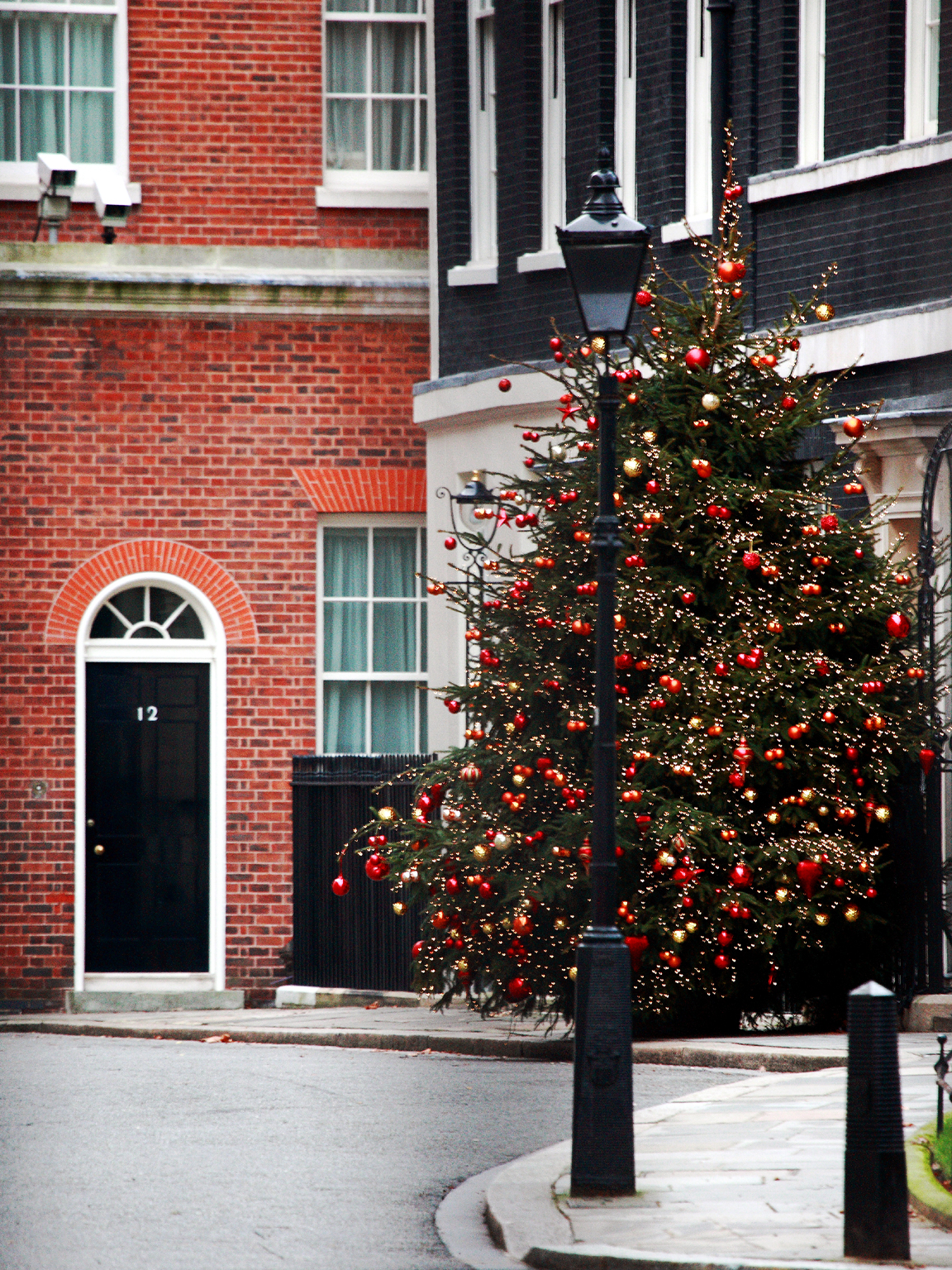
2009 tree from Hastings, East Sussex.

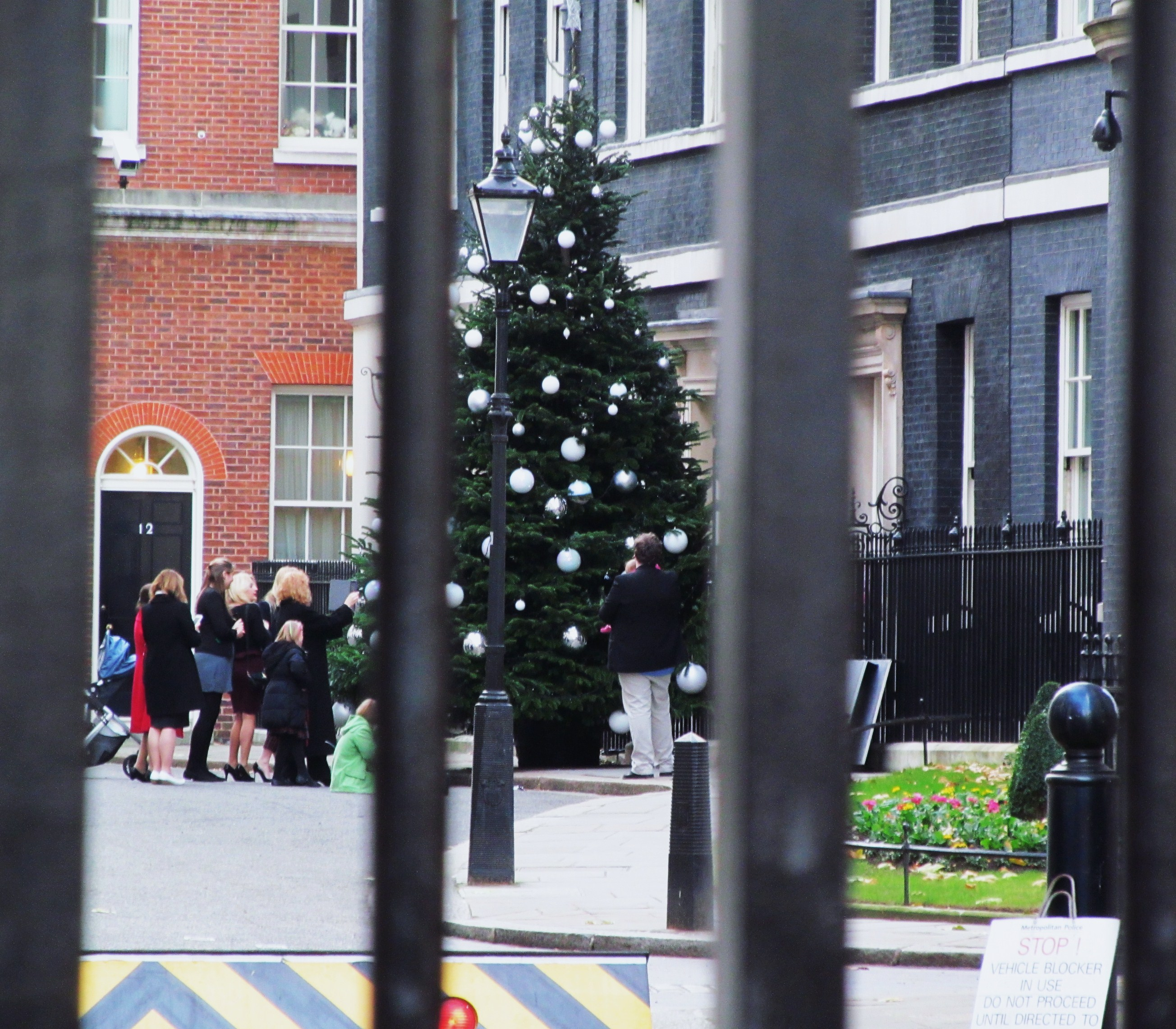
2013 tree from Christmas Common in Oxfordshire

== See also ==
- Trafalgar Square Christmas tree
- White House Christmas tree
