= Watlington Town Hall =

Municipal building in Watlington, Oxfordshire, England

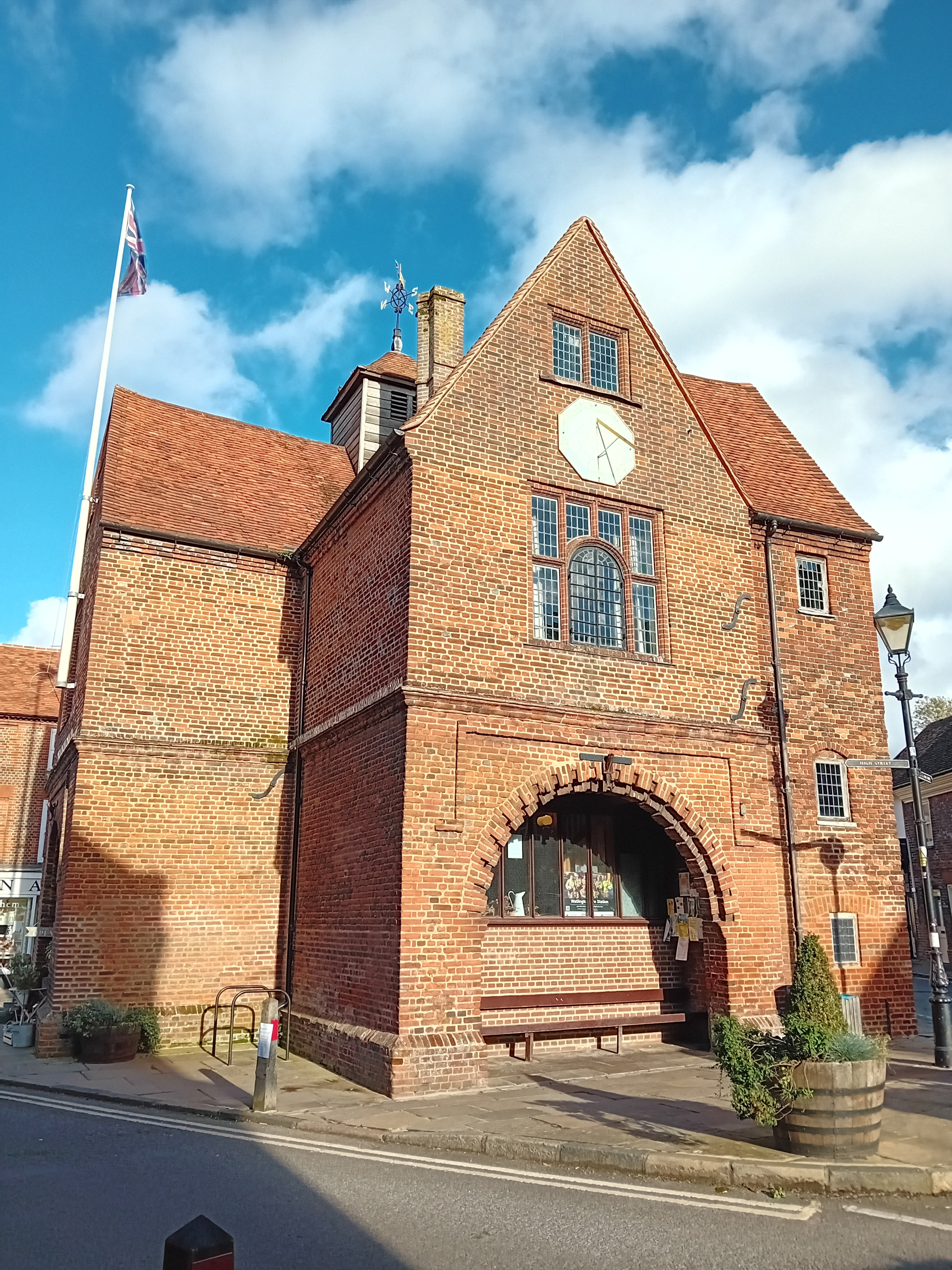
- Watlington Town Hall

- Shown in Oxfordshire
- 51.6450°N 1.0046°W
- Location: High Street, Watlington

History
- Built: 1665

Site notes
- Architectural style: Neoclassical style

Listed Building – Grade II*
- Official name: Town Hall
- Designated: 18 July 1963
- Reference no.: 1369012

Watlington Town Hall is a municipal building in the High Street in Watlington, Oxfordshire, England. The building, which is used as a community events venue, is a Grade II* listed building.

== History ==
The building was commissioned by the local lord of the manor, Thomas Stonor of Watlington Park, for the benefit of the town in the wake of the Stuart Restoration. The building was designed in the neoclassical style, built in bricks of various colours and was completed in 1665. The bricks were sourced from a local brickworks owned by the Russell family.

The design involved a symmetrical main frontage with three bays facing south down Couching Street; the central bay, which projected forward, featured a wide round headed archway on the ground floor, a three-light window with ovolo-moulded partitions on the first floor and a two-light window with ovolo-moulded partitions in the gable above. A sundial was installed above the first-floor window on the southern elevation. The east and west elevations were fenestrated and gabled in a similar style. Internally, the principal rooms were a market hall on the ground floor and school room for Watlington Free Grammar School on the first floor, and there was also an undercroft under the building. A clock mechanism for the town hall was designed and manufactured at the studios of Sir Christopher Wren and a clock face was installed in the eastern gable.

Stonor provided an endowment for the schoolmaster's salary and Dame Alice Tipping of Ewelme endowed additional student places in 1731. A three-storey extension was built in the southeast corner to accommodate a staircase to the schoolrooms in the early 19th century. The parish vestry established a National School, which shared the same rooms in the town hall, in 1842. The grammar school was then integrated into the National School under a single headmaster in 1853. However, a school inspection found that the school had inferior facilities compared with others in the area, and it closed in the 1872. The building was also used for meetings of the court leet and for social events until around that time.

By the late 19th century, the building was disused and in a considerable state of disrepair: the then lord of the manor, John Frederic Symonds Jeune, conveyed it to four trustees who raised funds by public subscription to restore it in 1907 and then, after the works had been completed, conveyed it on to the parish council in 1911. The building was subsequently used as a community events venue throughout the rest of the 20th century and it continued in that role into the 21st century. The town hall appeared as a location in an episode of Midsomer Murders entitled "Judgement Day", which starred Timothy West and Hannah Gordon and was broadcast in January 2000.

== See also ==
- Grade II* listed buildings in South Oxfordshire
