= Orange Bakery =

Bakery in Watlington, Oxfordshire

Coordinates: 51.64522614652963°N 1.0047703996337038°W

- Company type: Private
- Industry: Bakery
- Founded: 2019; 6 years ago
- Founders: Kitty and Alex Tait
- Headquarters: Watlington, Oxfordshire, United Kingdom
- Website: www.theorangebakery.org

Orange Bakery is an artisanal bakery and baked goods shop located in Watlington, Oxfordshire, UK. It was started in 2019 by Kitty Tait with the help of her father, Alex, when she was aged 15 and battling with mental health issues.

What began as a private pastime and a form of self-care grew into a business, first in the form of a weekly pop-up shop, followed by the crowdfunded opening of a full-time bakery store in May 2019.

The Taits have written a book, Breadsong: How Baking Changed Our Lives (Bloomsbury Publishing, 2022), based on their experiences, which also includes baking recipes.
