= Watlington White Mark =

Hill figure in Oxfordshire, England

Coordinates: 51°38′20″N 0°59′23″W

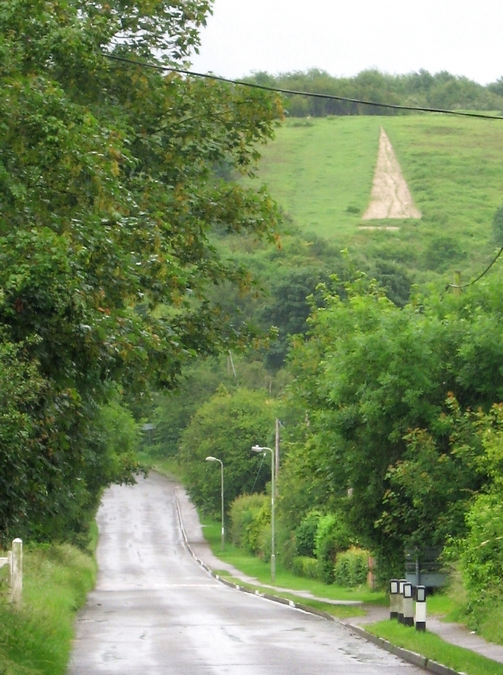
Watlington White Mark viewed from the village

Watlington White Mark is a chalk hill figure located on Watlington Hill, a mile from the village of Watlington, Oxfordshire. It is 270 feet tall and 36 feet wide, and is one of several hill figures cut into the Chilterns, alongside the Whiteleaf Cross, Bledlow Cross and Whipsnade White Lion. The site is owned by the National Trust.

The unusually-shaped White Mark was cut in 1764 by the local landsowner Edward Horne. Unimpressed that the village's parish church, St Leonard, lacked a spire, he commissioned the cutting of the spire-shaped figure into Watlington Hill so that, if viewed from a certain location (variously given as the window of his home, Greenfield Manor, or at a point on the Watlington to Oxford road), the figure aligned with the top of the church, giving the optical illusion that the White Mark was the church's spire. The Victoria County History describes the figure as a folly intended to resemble an obelisk, but the figure has also been described as a pyramid, triangle or stripe.

Although its purpose as a faux-spire is widely accepted, some writers, including H. J. Massingham, proposed that the figure is of greater antiquity dating back thousands of years and perhaps phallic in nature, as its apex points south-south-east, possibly indicating that the rising sun would strike it during the midsummer equinox. These theories have been rejected by later authors on the subject, who reinforce its status as an estate ornament, folly or spire.

== Description and location ==
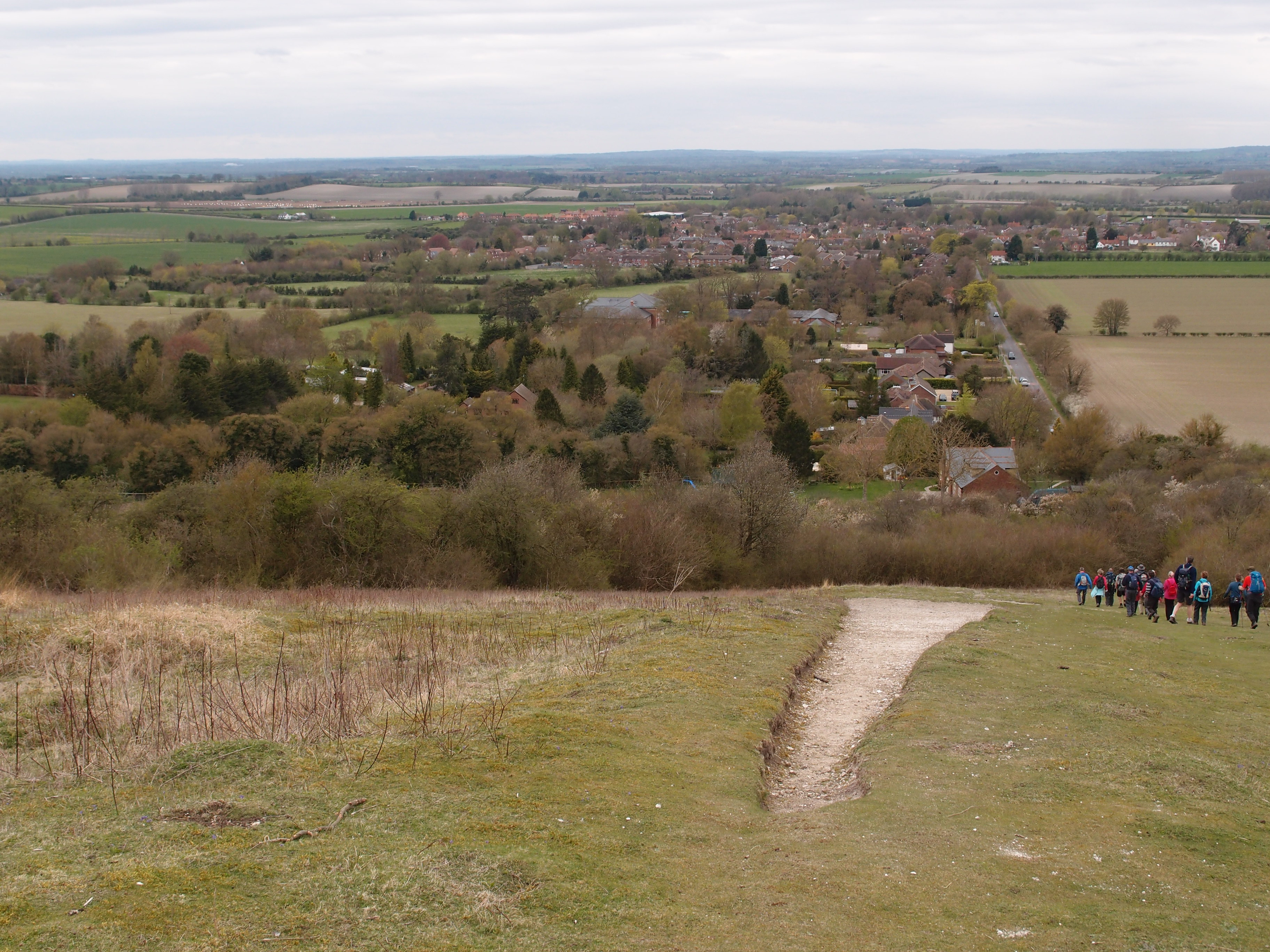
View from the top of the figure

Located one mile south-east of Watlington, the Watlington White Mark is cut into the chalk slopes of Watlington Hill on the Chiltern escarpment. The figure is 270 feet (82 metres) tall and 36 feet (11 metres) wide, and its apex points south-south-east, pointing up to Christmas Common. The White Mark is elongated and slender, and has been variously described as an obelisk, or obelisk-shaped hill figure, triangle, pyramid, folly, chalk scar, "tidily tapered chalk stripe", "gleaming white spire", "triangular bare patch", or "elongated shape". Among authors, Gwyn Headley and Wim Meulenkamp write: "This is, take your pick, a triangular obelisk or a spire-shaped hill figure", while Rodney Castleden opines that "it looks like nothing recognisable – except perhaps a church spire". He deems it similar to the former great cross at Plumpton Plain in East Sussex. Calling it a "two-dimensional obelisk", Geoffrey Grigson considers it a "notable hill figure" of a unique design, differing from the white horses cut throughout the country.

The Watlington White Mark is one of four extant, or near-extant, hill figures cut into the steep chalk downs of the Chilterns, as well as one of two – alongside the Whipsnade White Lion of 1933 – which is relatively modern. The White Mark is within the vicinity of the two other figures – the Bledlow Cross and Whiteleaf Cross – which are of less certain origin. The Bledlow Cross, on the same Chiltern escarpment, was cut a few miles away in the titular village, whereas the Whiteleaf Cross is located seven miles away, and features a base somewhat resembling the Watlington White Mark in shape although blunter. The White Mark can be seen for miles, including (along with the Whiteleaf Cross) from as far as Magdalen Tower. The mark is best viewed on the road travelling east from Watlington to Christmas Common, specifically a point on the road located around half a mile (800 m) outside Watlington. A small car park is provided to visitors.

== Origins and purpose ==
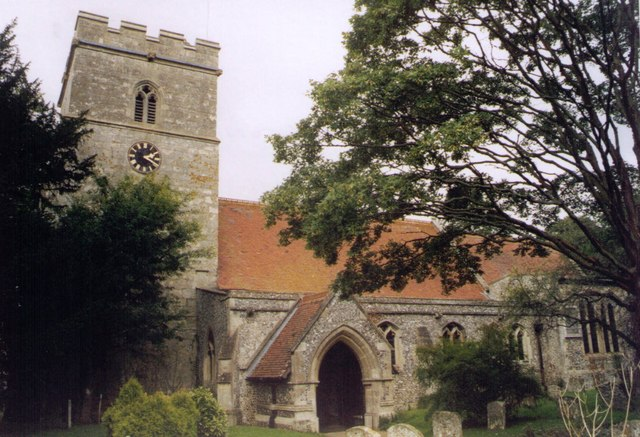
St Leonard church, Watlington

The Victoria County History records the White Mark as simply an 18th-century folly intended to represent an obelisk, but its purpose has since been specified further. It was cut in 1764 by landsowner Edward Horne of Greenfield Manor. Horne believed the village's St Leonard parish church tower would look more impressive if it appeared to have a spire if viewed from his house. Unwilling or unable to secure the funding to provide a spire, he instead assembled a labour force to carve the Watlington White Mark as a backdrop, so that from his home he could enjoy the illusion of the church appearing to have a spire, as the figure aligned with the top of the church from his window. For this reason it has also been described an optical illusion.

According to The Wiltshire Archaeological and Natural History Magazine, Horne was already familiar with fashionable follies and obelisks, so it is possible that the figure required no other inspiration than those, but they believe its purpose as a faux-spire "cannot be ignored" because it is cut directly in line with the church, conforming to the expected size and shape. The faux-spire origin was first recorded in 1851, reporting that the St Leonard's vicar cut it as a substitute to compensate for the church's lack of spire. The origin story was uncovered by Steve Graham, and the identity of its maker and cutting date by Lawrence Duttson. The Edward Horne family's mausoleum is located in the church.

It has also been suggested that, rather than from his home, the 'spire' was cut by Horne so that it appeared atop the church if viewed from a certain point on the Oxford to Watlington road. The author Kate Bergamar separates the theories that it was cut as either "an elegant obelisk and estate ornament in the manner of the follies of that period", or a mark "intended to look like Watlington church spire when viewed by coach travellers on the Oxford Road." John Timpson, who supports the Oxford to Watlington road theory, describes the figure as a "not just another chalk carving, but a detachable spire", and praises the "ingenious" way that Horne provided the Church with a 'spire' without concerning himself with building regulations or planning permission, adding: "Anyone who disliked this effect only had to travel a little further along the road and the White Mark was just a white mark again. I am not sure if the church authorities approved, but to my mind Mr Horn qualifies for the Order of Shovelry, Coup d'Oeil Class". The author Peter Ashley calls the idea "so English" but writes that, aside from the immense amount of semaphore flag-waving and messaging that would have been required to align the figure correctly, "the idea doesn't appear to work wherever you are, and if you do manage to more less line it up by squatting in a field with your head between your legs the triangle still leans vertiginously to the right."

=== Alternate theories ===
Williamson says that there is "no real doubt" that the White Mark was cut by local landowner Horne in 1764, but according to Bergamar, some propose that the White Mark is a phallic symbol of greater antiquity, similar to what the Whitleaf and Bledlow Crosses may have looked like prior to Christianisation. H. J. Massingham described the White Mark and the crosses of Bledlow and Whiteleaf as "mysterious huge signatures of cabalistic meaning". In particular, he described the White Mark as a "strange and elegant white pyramid cut in the chalk", whose apex points SSE, "so that the sun, rising over the hill, possibly at the midsummer equinox, would strike it." He noted that the apex ends with a diamond, possibly indicating that "here is an original pointer to the most potent of the heavenly bodies, from 2000 to 2500 years older than Shakespeare's 'shepherds dials.' Masingham added that if, as he believed, the Whiteleaf Cross was an astrological or phallic monument dating to the Late Bronze Age but later Christianised by a horizontal arm, "it is likely that the White Mark was not very much later." Castleden says the Whiteleaf Cross may have originated as a "magical or zodiacal cipher and later redesigned in the Christian era to make it into a cross", but that if the White Mark has similar origins, it "[has] evidently not been adapted" in a similar way, due to its unrecognisable shape.

Bergamar describes these theories as "almost certainly" wrong, instead deeming the White Mark as simply a folly or faux-spire. The author Elizabeth Cull wrote that Massingham "went into ecstasies" over the figure, "deciding on no evidence at all that it had been carved two-and-a-half thousand years ago as a pointer for the summer equinox." Though deeming Massingham to be "totally wrong", she commented that he accidentally struck the truth by describing the figure as resembling "the ghostly shadow of a church spire lying across the hill", since Horne had the figure cut to resemble one, "[and] that is the true tale of Watlington White Mark, neither phallic nor Celtic, but the fruit of an old man's whim." The writer Paul Newman says the "singular line of argument" affixed to the Whiteleaf Cross – that, given its location on the ancient trackers' route Icknield Way, adjoining a long barrow and adjacent to similar antique sites – is that it may have been a Bronze Age monument later conventionalised to a cross by Christian monks. He says it has been applied "less convincingly" to the White Mark but believed it is much less likely a solar-phallic symbol than something Horne cut to "beautify his estate". Headley and Meulenkamp comment that "hill figure enthusiasts would interpret the elongated shape as a phallus, but of course we know better."

== Modern history ==
Watlington Hill, the land the hill figure lies on, is a Site of Special Scientific Interest (SSSI) and is property of the National Trust, who intricately maintain it. As of 1996, the Watlington White Mark has been scoured (recut) annually, typically by hoe and using volunteer labour, with work often carrying on for two or three days in total. Alistair Roach, then-Property Manager of the National Trust Central Chilterns, commented that they "occasionally used chemical weed control but it has not really proved satisfactory and we also have to consider that this site is a SSSI". As of 1949, hawthorn, dogwood and the wayfaring-tree had begun growing on the sweet-scented turf beside the figure. In October 2014, to celebrate the mark's 250th anniversary, visitors were invited to re-chalk (scour) the figure and bring jarred nightlights and fairy lights to illuminate it. Additionally, afternoon plans were arranged for clearing scrubs and bushcraft activities. Writing in 2014, the BBC reported that it has become hard to align the White Mark with the top of the church "due to trees blocking the view."

In his book Pastoral Peculiars (2005), Ashley describes the Watlington White Mark as one of two notable English faux spires that pretend to be where they are not, alongside the Sugar Loaf Folly in Dallington, East Sussex, erected by the squire Mad Jack Fuller. The White Mark has featured in books dedicated to hill figures, folly buildings, and countryside curiosities. The National Trust deem it an "unusual feature" of Watlington Hill and the Chilterns countryside.

== See also ==
- Uffington White Horse (another Oxfordshire hill figure)
