= British Christmas Tree Growers Association =

Christmas trees growers trade association

The British Christmas Tree Growers Association is the trade association for those who grow specialist Christmas Trees in Great Britain and Northern Ireland. Membership is open to those who intend to grow or are growing trees for the Christmas market. Associate membership is available for those who provide goods and services to the Christmas Tree sector.

Members of the BCTGA cultivate trees specially for the Christmas festivities.

== Annual Competition ==
The BCTGA holds an annual competition to find the best grower from among its membership. Entries to the competition are divided into four categories: Pine, Fir, Spruce and Wreath. All trees must be between 1.8 m and 2.2 m in height. Each entrant is allowed up to two entries in any given category, and the judges look for foliage, shape and marketability.

The competition awards a prize for 'Grower of the Year', and the winner is afforded the honour of providing their tree as the Downing Street Christmas tree that year. The winner of the best wreath category also provides a wreath to be hung on the famous black door.

== See also ==
- American Christmas Tree Association
- Christmas tree cultivation
- National Christmas Tree Association
- Downing Street Christmas Tree
