= National Christmas Tree Association =

Professional organization associated with Christmas trees

The National Christmas Tree Association (NCTA) is a professional organization in the United States of over 5,100 "Christmas tree professionals" in various capacities. The group focuses its work into three areas: promotion and research, federal representation (which includes Congressional lobbying), and professional education. The association was founded in 1955 and has more than 1,800 members.

== Blue Room Christmas tree ==
The official White House Christmas tree, or the Blue Room Christmas Tree, is donated each year by the National Christmas Tree Association (NCTA). The NCTA has donated the tree since 1966; it is chosen through a contest among members of the trade group. Growers participate in state or regional competitions for a chance at competition at the National Convention. The winner of the National Convention is declared the Grand Champion and the tree is then presented to the First Lady.

== See also ==
- American Christmas Tree Association
- British Christmas Tree Growers Association
- Christmas tree cultivation
