= Karl Penhale =

English cricketer

Personal information
- Full name: Karl William Penhale
- Born: 3 February 1992 (age 34); High Wycombe, Buckinghamshire, England
- Batting: Right-handed
- Bowling: Right-arm medium

Domestic team information
- Years: Team
- 2013–2016: Oxfordshire
- 2014: Oxford UCCE

Career statistics
Competition	First-class
Matches	1
Runs scored	26
Batting average	13.00
100s/50s	–/–
Top score	21
Balls bowled	130
Wickets	3
Bowling average	28.33
5 wickets in innings	–
10 wickets in match	–
Best bowling	2/69
Catches/stumpings	2/–
- Source: Cricinfo, 23 June 2019

Karl William Penhale (born 3 February 1992) is an English former first-class cricketer.

Penhale was born at High Wycombe in Buckinghamshire, but was educated at Icknield Community College in neighbouring Oxfordshire. From there he went up to Oxford Brookes University. While studying at Oxford Brookes he made a single appearance in first-class cricket for Oxford MCCU against Nottinghamshire at Oxford in 2014. With his right-arm medium pace bowling, Penhale dismissed Jake Ball and Andy Carter in Nottinghamshire's first-innings, finishing with figures of 2 for 69 from 17.2 overs. In their second-innings he dismissed Luke Fletcher to finish with figures of 1 for 16 from 4.2 overs. Batting twice in the match, Penhale was dismissed for 5 runs in Oxford MCCU's first-innings by Samit Patel, while in their second-innings he was dismissed by Steven Mullaney for 21 runs. In addition to playing first-class cricket, Penhale has also appeared at minor counties level for Oxfordshire between 2013–16, making fourteen appearances in the Minor Counties Championship, alongside thirteen and four appearances in the MCCA Knockout Trophy and Minor Counties Twenty20 respectively.
