= Watlington Chalk Pit =

Nature reserve in Oxfordshire, England

Coordinates: 51.640°N 0.991°W

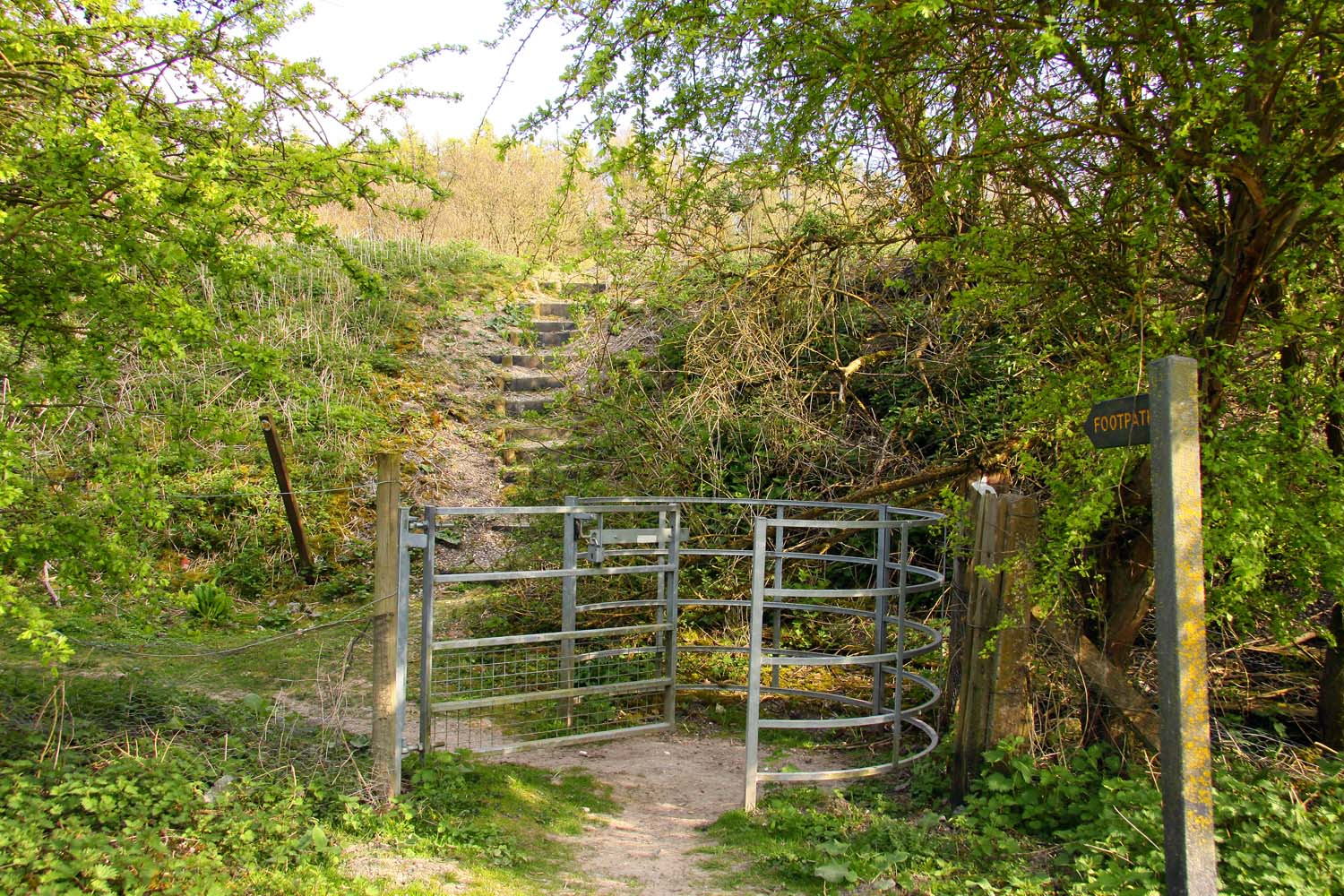
- Interactive map of Watlington Chalk Pit
- Type: Local Nature Reserve
- Location: Watlington, Oxfordshire
- OS grid: SU 699 940
- Area: 1.6 hectares (4.0 acres)
- Manager: Watlington Parish Council and Watlington Environment Group

Watlington Chalk Pit is a 1.6-hectare (4.0-acre) Local Nature Reserve east of Watlington in Oxfordshire. It is owned by South Oxfordshire District Council and managed by Watlington Parish Council and Watlington Environment Group. It is part of Watlington and Pyrton Hills Site of Special Scientific Interest.

This site has floristically rich chalk grassland and scrub. There are many lichens, mosses and liverworts, and twenty species of butterfly have been recorded. Wintering birds include fieldfares, redwings, yellowhammer and linnets.

There is access from Hill Road.
