= Shirburn Hill =

Hill in Oxfordshire

Coordinates: 51.653°N 0.968°W

- Site of Special Scientific Interest
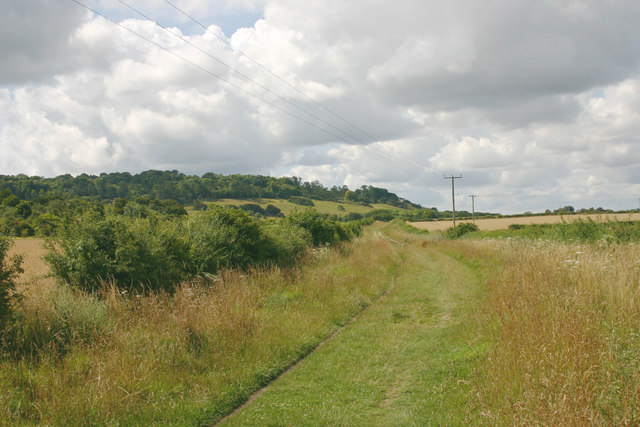
- Location of Shirburn Hill.
- Area of search: Oxfordshire
- Grid reference: SU 715 954
- Interest: Biological
- Area: 63.7 hectares (157 acres)
- Notification date: 1986
- Location map: Magic Map

Shirburn Hill is a 63.7-hectare (157-acre) biological Site of Special Scientific Interest just outside and to the northeast of Watlington, Oxfordshire.

The hill has chalk grassland, chalk heath, scrub and broadleaved woodland. Most grasslands in the Chilterns are maintained by stock, and the site is unusual in being cropped only by rabbits. Less closely grazed areas have taller grass with species such as false oat-grass, tor-grass and red fescue. There are large areas of hawthorn and buckthorn scrub.
