= American Christmas Tree Association =

American trade association

The American Christmas Tree Association is an American, non-profit organization and industry trade group that represents those involved in the artificial Christmas tree industry.

In November 2008, the association launched a new website, which, according to the association, was meant to, "promote accurate and factual consumer information and provide consumers with the tools they need to make an educated choice about the right tree for their holiday and family enjoyment".

The American Christmas Tree Association is based in West Hollywood, California.

== See also ==
- British Christmas Tree Growers Association
- National Christmas Tree Association
