= Watlington and Pyrton Hills =

Nature reserve in Oxfordshire, England

Coordinates: 51.639°N 0.983°W

- Site of Special Scientific Interest
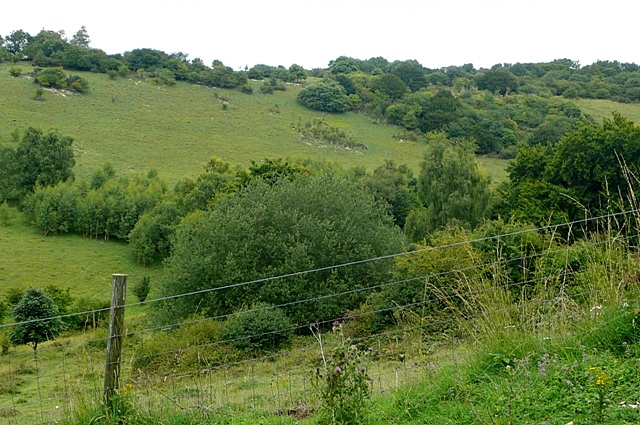
- Location of Watlington and Pyrton Hills.
- Area of search: Oxfordshire
- Grid reference: SU 705 938
- Interest: Biological
- Area: 112.7 hectares (278 acres)
- Notification date: 1989
- Location map: Magic Map

Watlington and Pyrton Hills is a 112.7-hectare (278-acre) biological Site of Special Scientific Interest east of Watlington in Oxfordshire. An area of 1.6 hectares (4.0 acres) is Watlington Chalk Pit, which is a Local Nature Reserve.

This site has floristically diverse chalk grassland, chalk scrub, broadleaved woodland and yew woodland. Watlington Hill has short turf which is grazed by rabbits, with flowering plants including yellow-wort, dropwort, horseshoe vetch, squinancywort and the nationally rare candytuft.
