= Icknield Community College =

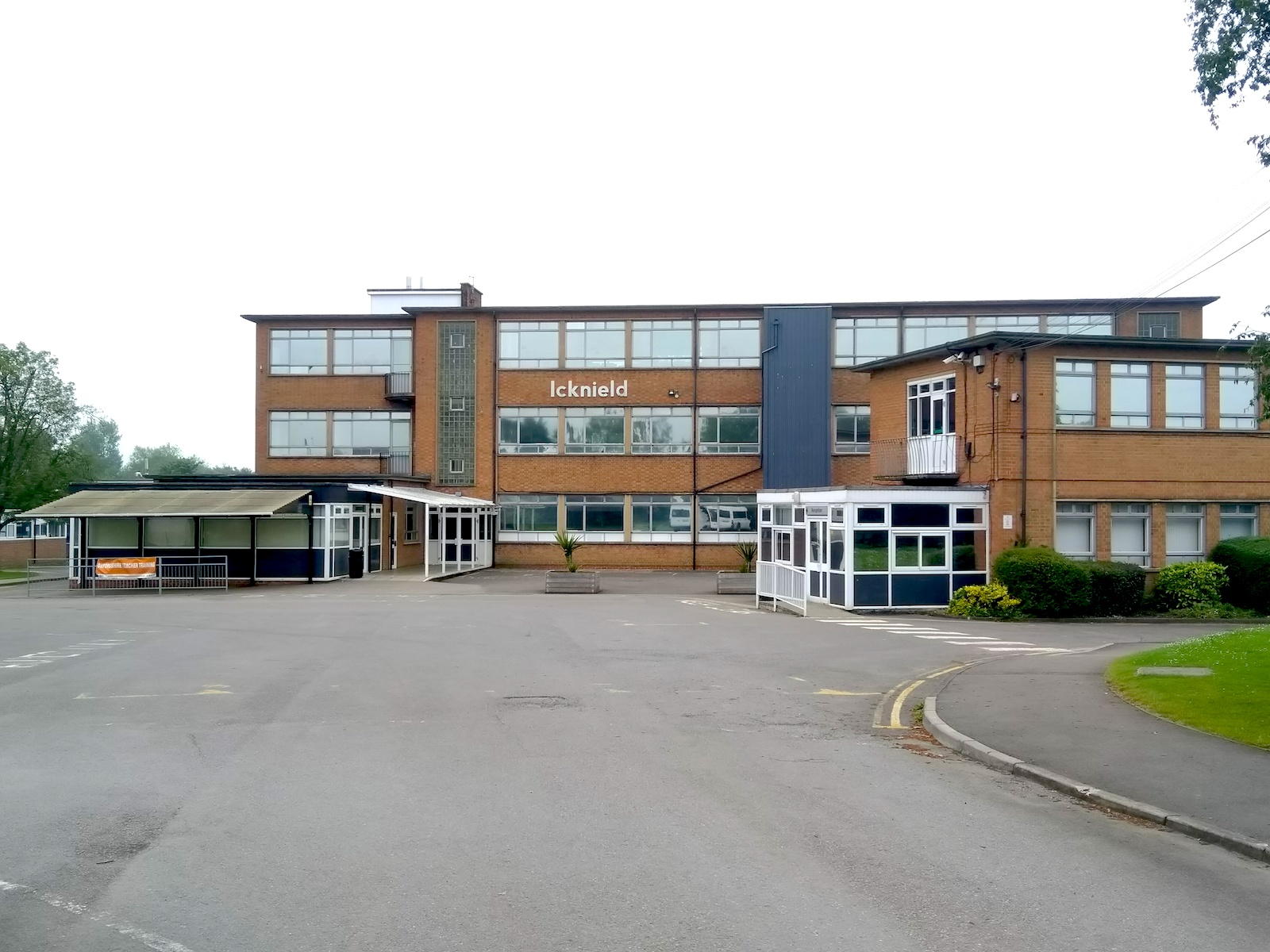

Location
- Love Lane; Watlington, Oxfordshire, OX49 5RB; England
- 51.64839°N 1.00706°W

Information
- Type: Academy
- Motto: Integrity, Care, Commitment
- Religious affiliation: N/A
- Local authority: Oxfordshire
- Trust: Acer Trust
- Department for Education URN: 143984 Tables
- Ofsted: Reports
- Headteacher: Mat Hunter
- Gender: Coeducational
- Age: 11 to 16
- Enrolment: c. 700
- Website: http://www.icknield.oxon.sch.uk

Icknield Community College is a coeducational secondary school located in Watlington, Oxfordshire, England. It offers tuition for years 7-11 (ages 11–16), culminating in the GCSE exams. The school is situated next to Watlington Primary School.

Icknield admits students from its catchment area covering, in addition to Watlington itself, the nearby Oxfordshire villages of Chinnor, Chalgrove, Benson and others, as well from Stokenchurch across the county border in Buckinghamshire.

In its March 2015 Ofsted inspection, the school was rated "Good".

In 2017, Icknield converted to academy status, and joined the Acer Trust, a multi-academy trust of Oxfordshire schools.

== Notable former pupils ==
- Karl Penhale (born 1992), cricketer
- Tom Varndell (born 1985), Rugby Union
