= Watlington Park =

Country house in Watlington, Oxfordshire, England

Coordinates: 51°37′38.5″N 0°58′51.6″W

Watlington Park is an English country house with its surrounding grounds of approximately 500 acres (200 ha), located atop an escarpment in the Chiltern Hills, approximately 0.5 miles (0.80 km) southwest of Christmas Common and 1.4 miles (2.3 km) southeast of Watlington, Oxfordshire.

== History ==
The park was created in the 13th century by Richard of Cornwall. The estate formed part of a royal park until 1632, when Charles I sold the land to William Stonor of the nearby Stonor Park in order to raise funds for his government. Around the middle of the 18th century it was sold to John Tilson, who built the mansion which essentially still exists today.

In the late 19th century, Watlington Park exchanged hands multiple times, until Oliver Brett, 3rd Viscount Esher, bought it in 1920, renovating and extending the house. His son, the architect and city planner Lionel Brett, 4th Viscount Esher, inherited the property upon his father's death in 1963, pared down the property to its earlier design removing much of the 19th and 20th century additions, and lived as well as ran his architectural practice together with Francis Pollen from there.

The house became Grade II* listed on 18 July 1963, meaning it is considered a "particularly important building of more than special interest".

Some time in the 1960s, Lionel Brett gave the house to his eldest son, and built a new house of his own, somewhat unusual design, named The Tower, on the grounds of the estate, as a country residence for himself and his wife.

In several instalments during the 20th century, large parts of the estate were donated to or otherwise placed under the administration of the National Trust, including the adjoining Watlington Hill. In 1941, the Esher family donated a large portion of the park to the National Trust. Then, in 1946, the family donated Greenfield Copse, Lower Deans and Howe Wood to the National Trust. In 1974, they gave a larch plantation to the National Trust. In the 1990s, the National Trust bought the remainder of Watlington Hill. The hill is now under total administration by the National Trust.

The property stayed in the Brett (Viscounts Esher) family until 2003, just before the 4th Viscount's death, when it was sold for a rumoured £15 million to an undisclosed buyer.
