= Christmas Common =

Hamlet in Oxfordshire, England

Coordinates: 51.634°N 0.970°W

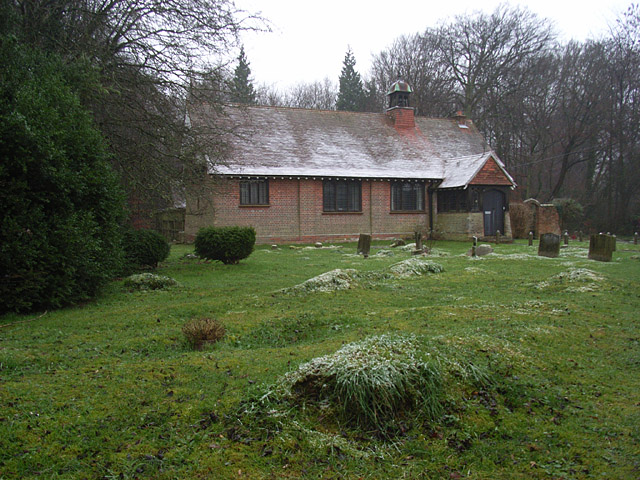
- Former Chapel of the Nativity, now a private house

- Location within Oxfordshire
- OS grid reference: SU713932
  - London: 43 miles (69 km)
- Civil parish: Watlington
- District: South Oxfordshire
- Shire county: Oxfordshire
- Region: South East
- Country: England
- Sovereign state: United Kingdom
- Post town: Watlington
- Postcode district: OX49
- Dialling code: 01491
- Police: Thames Valley
- Fire: Oxfordshire
- Ambulance: South Central
- UK Parliament: Henley
- Website: Watlington Parish Council

Christmas Common is a hamlet in Watlington civil parish, Oxfordshire about 7 1/2 miles (12 km) south of Thame in Oxfordshire, close to the boundary with Buckinghamshire. The hamlet is 812 feet (247 m) above sea level on an escarpment of the Chiltern Hills. Because of its elevation, Christmas Common has two radio masts that are prominent local landmarks.

== History ==
The hamlet's unusual toponym is of uncertain origin. It is variously ascribed to a 1643 Christmas Day truce between combatants in the English Civil War, local holly tree coppices, or the Christmas family, which had local connections. Watlington Park is a private park and country house about 3/4 mile (1.2 km) southwest of Christmas Common. In 1675 Thomas Stonor, 3rd Baron Camoys of Stonor Park had a large house built here on an H-shaped plan. The Stonor family were recusants, and the house included a Roman Catholic chapel at which local Roman Catholics attended Mass. Between 1716 and 1756 John Talbot Stonor, Vicar Apostolic of the Midland District was a frequent visitor.

In the 1750s the Stonors sold the house to John Tilson, who had a new house built to a compact Palladian design and re-used at least part of the older house as servants' quarters. Late in the 19th and early in the 20th century, subsequent owners altered and enlarged the Tilson house. Oliver Brett, later Viscount Esher, bought Watlington Park in 1921 and continued enlarging and modernising it. In 1954 his successor Major Lionel Brett, an architect, demolished all the extensions and the remains of the 17th century Stonor house and added pedimented pavilions of his own design.

In 1967 Lionel Brett, by now 4th Viscount Esher, built the modernist Tower House for himself in a wood away from the hamlet. Christmas Common has never been populous. The 1811 census named the hamlet as a liberty and reported that it had only six inhabited houses. The Church of England parish church of the Nativity was designed by the architect Walter Cave. It was built in 1889 as a chapel of ease to save Anglican residents from travelling 2 miles (3 km) downhill to the parish church, St Leonard's in Watlington. It was made redundant in the 20th century and is now a private house.

== Amenities ==
The Chilterns are an Area of Outstanding Natural Beauty. The scarp slope of the Chilterns faces northwest from the hamlet steeply downhill towards Watlington. Much of the area between Christmas Common and Watlington is designated as the Watlington and Pyrton Hills Site of Special Scientific Interest (SSSI). The ancient Icknield Way follows the line of the Chilterns and is now a long-distance footpath. The Oxfordshire Way long-distance footpath passes through Christmas Common on its route between Bourton-on-the-Water and Henley-on-Thames, and crosses the Icknield Way 1 mile (1.6 km) downhill from the village.

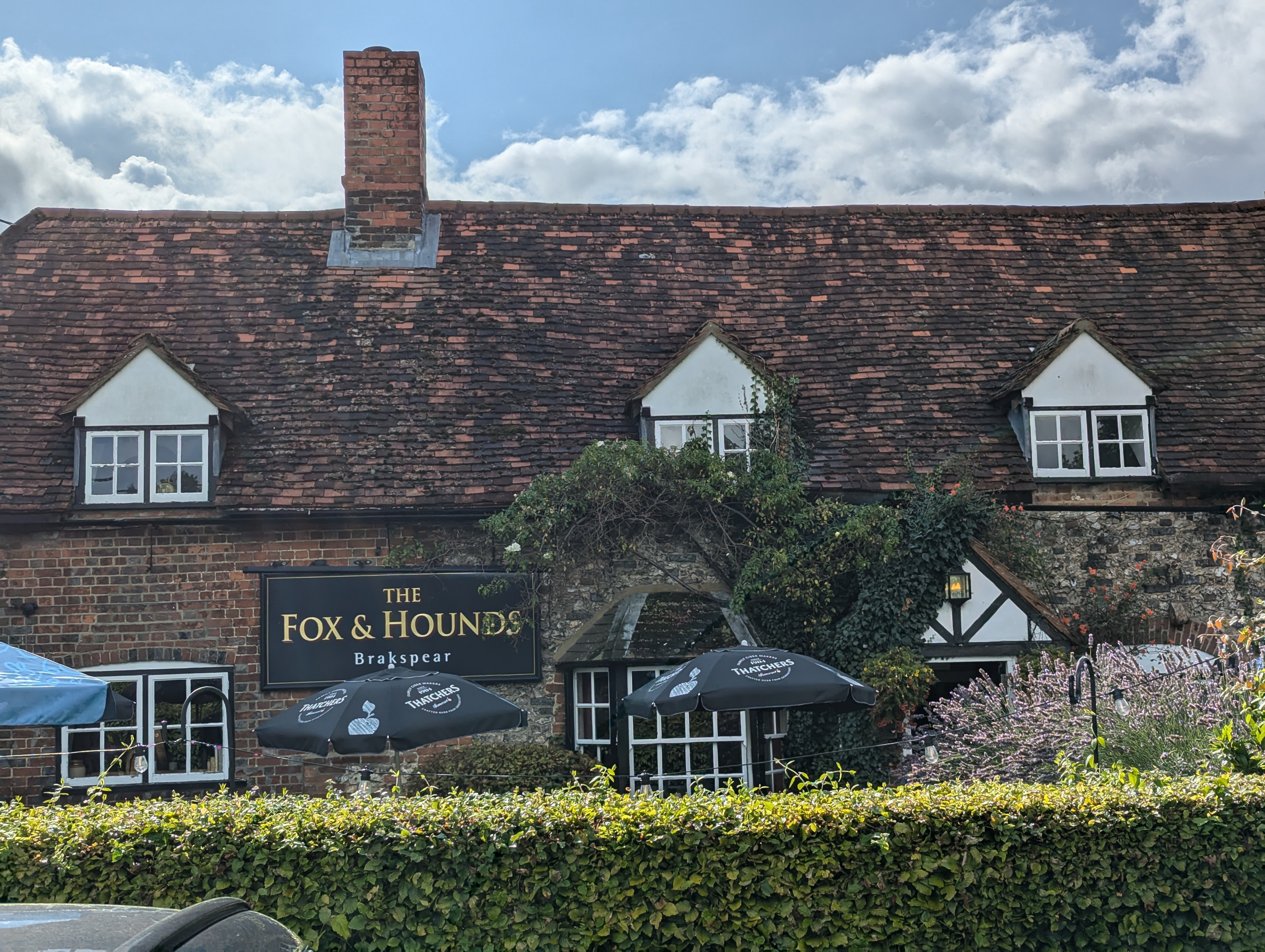
The Fox and Hounds pub-restaurant at Christmas Common, Oxfordshire.

The surrounding beech woods and local rights of way are popular with walkers, cyclists, horse riders and birdwatchers. The National Trust provides a car park at Watlington Hill on the edge of Christmas Common. The area is a good place to see red kites, which had been extinct in southern England but were successfully reintroduced in 1989. The hamlet has a dog-friendly public house and restaurant, the Fox and Hounds, controlled by W.H. Brakspear & Sons.

== Residents ==
The philologist and lexicographer William Craigie lived at Christmas Common for more than 20 years in his retirement, until his death in 1957

== Sources ==
- Dictionary of National Biography. Vol. 1–21. Oxford: Oxford University Press. 1971. p. 267.
- Lobel, Mary D, ed. (1964). A History of the County of Oxford. Victoria County History. Vol. 8: Lewknor and Pyrton Hundreds. London: Oxford University Press for the Institute of Historical Research. pp. 210–252.
- Mardell, Joshua (2020). "The Tower, Christmas Common, Watlington, Oxfordshire, C20 Society Building of the Month".
- Mills, A.D; Room, A (2003). A Dictionary of British Place-Names. Oxford: Oxford University Press. ISBN 0-19-852758-6.
- Sherwood, Jennifer; Pevsner, Nikolaus (1974). Oxfordshire. The Buildings of England. Harmondsworth: Penguin Books. pp. 543, 831–832. ISBN 0-14-071045-0.
- Thomas, Gavin (1993). The Oxfordshire Way (A Walker's Guide). Stroud: Alan Sutton Publishing. ISBN 978-0-7509-0356-1.
