= Watlington, Oxfordshire =

Town in Oxfordshire, England

Coordinates: 51.645°N 1.008°W

Watlington
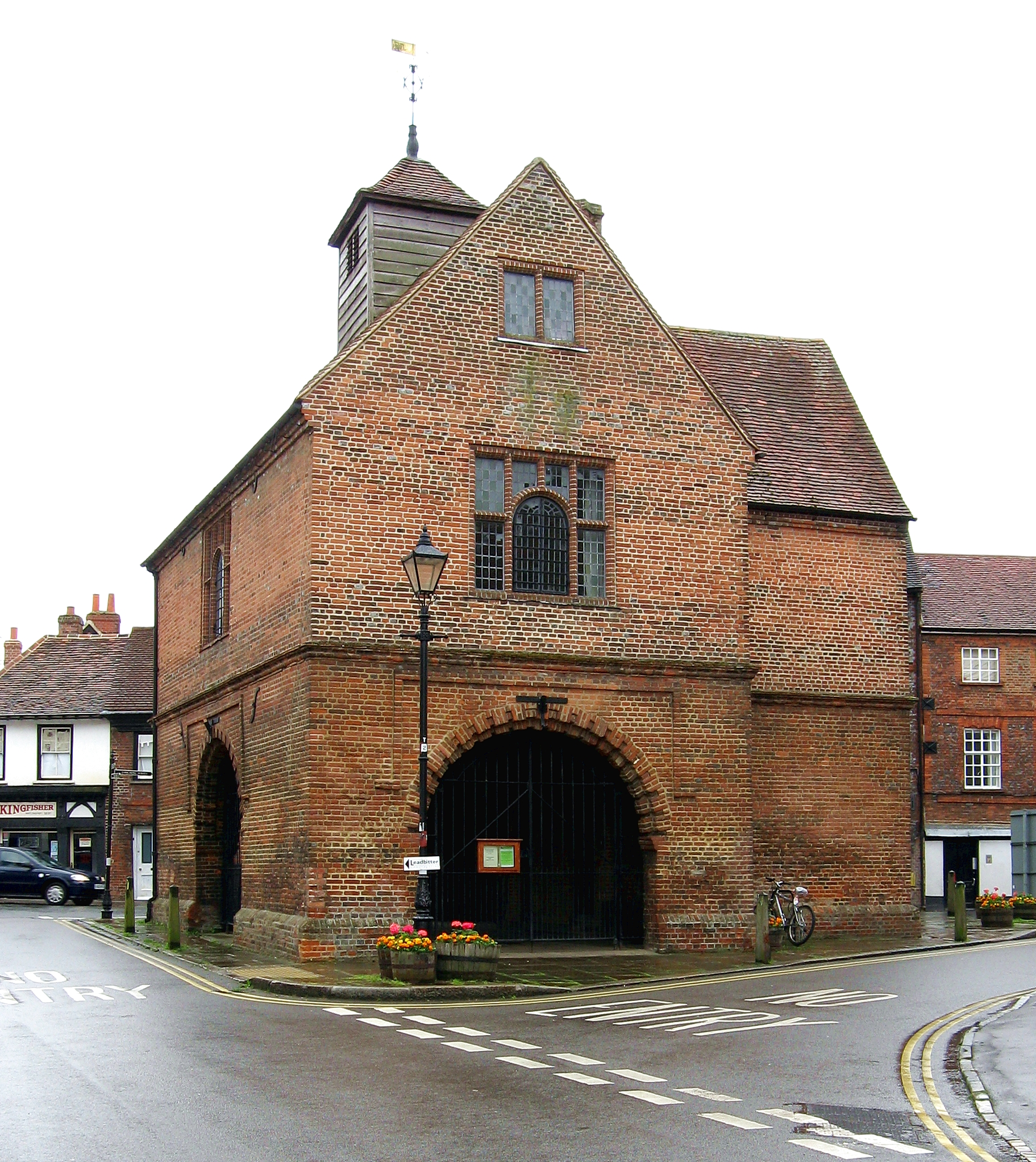
- Watlington Town Hall

- Location within Oxfordshire
- Area: 14.55 km^{2} (5.62 sq mi)
- Population: 2,727 (parish, 2011 Census)
  - Density: 187/km^{2} (480/sq mi)
- OS grid reference: SU687945
  - London: 43 mi (69 km)
- Civil parish: Watlington
- District: South Oxfordshire
- Shire county: Oxfordshire
- Region: South East
- Country: England
- Sovereign state: United Kingdom
- Post town: Watlington
- Postcode district: OX49
- Dialling code: 01491
- Police: Thames Valley
- Fire: Oxfordshire
- Ambulance: South Central
- UK Parliament: Henley and Thame
- Website: Watlington Parish Council

Watlington is a market town and civil parish in South Oxfordshire, England, about 7 miles (11 km) south of Thame. It is near Oxfordshire's eastern edge and less than 2 miles (3 km) from its border with Buckinghamshire. The parish includes the hamlets of Christmas Common, Greenfield and Howe Hill, all of which are in the Chiltern Hills. The 2011 Census recorded the parish's population as 2,727.

== History ==
The Watlington area is likely to have been settled at an early date, encouraged by the proximity of the Icknield Way. The toponym means "settlement of Waecel's people" and indicates occupation from around the 6th century. A 9th-century charter by Æthelred of Mercia records eight 'manses' or major dwellings in Watlington. The Domesday Book of 1086 referred to the town as Watelintone or Watelintune. Medieval documents indicate that the modern street plan was in existence in the 14th century, as Cochynes-lane (Couching Street), and Brook Street are recorded.

There are records of inns in Watlington since the 15th century. In 1722 the town's market was listed as being held on a Saturday. By the end of the 18th century the town had six inns, all of which were bought up in the next few years by a local brewing family, the Haywards. The number of licensed premises increased until late in the 19th century when George Wilkinson, a Methodist bought six of them and closed them down. Today Watlington has three public houses remaining: The Spire & Spoke (formerly the Carriers Arms), The Chequers and The Fat Fox Inn. Parliamentarian troops were billeted at Watlington during the English Civil War. It is thought that John Hampden stayed in the town the night before the Battle of Chalgrove Field.

In 1664–65 Watlington Town Hall was built at the expense of Thomas Stonor. Its upper room was endowed by Stonor as a grammar school for boys, and in 1731 Dame Alice Tipping of Ewelme gave a further endowment to increase the number of pupils. In 1842 the town Vestry established a National School, which shared the same rooms in the town hall. In 1843 a National School for girls was built next to St Leonard's church. In 1872 the boys' and girls' schools were absorbed into a new Board school, which like its predecessors was affiliated to the National Society for Promoting Religious Education. In 1927 the school was divided into separate junior and senior schools. In 1956 a new secondary school – the Icknield School – opened for senior pupils and the primary school took over the old premises. The Icknield School is now Icknield Community College.

By 1895 the town hall, which was no longer used as a school, was in disrepair. In 1907 it was restored by public subscription. It is a landmark at the meeting point of three roads in the centre of the town. Since 1990 Watlington has been twinned with the town of Mansle in the Poitou-Charentes region of France. The Watlington Hoard, a collection of silver items dating back to the time of Alfred the Great in the 9th century, was rediscovered in Watlington by James Mather, an amateur metal-detectorist, in 2015. The hoard was subsequently excavated, and eventually purchased by the Ashmolean Museum in Oxford for £1.35m.

== Watlington Hill ==
The town of Watlington lies at the foot of Watlington Hill, a 240 metres (790 ft) peak on the western edge of the Chiltern Hills Area of Outstanding Natural Beauty. The Ridgeway National Trail walking route, which is part of the longer Icknield Way, passes nearby between the town and the hill. Due to its close proximity and easy access to the Chilterns, Watlington is a popular gateway to the many outdoor activities in the area, including hill walking, cycling and birdwatching, especially of the red kite, which is well established in the vicinity.

Watlington Hill is home to a wide variety of flora and fauna, and is designated a Site of Special Scientific Interest (SSSI) as part of Watlington and Pyrton Hills. It is managed by the National Trust. The nearby Shirburn Hill is another SSSI in the area. The Watlington White Mark, a spire mark, is cut into the chalk soil of Watlington Hill. This was designed by local squire Edward Horne, who felt that the parish church of St Leonard, when viewed from his home, would be more impressive if it appeared to have a spire. He therefore had this unusual folly cut into the chalk soil in 1764, and it continues to this day to be maintained by the local residents. The mark is 36 feet (11 m) wide at its base and 270 feet (82 m) long.

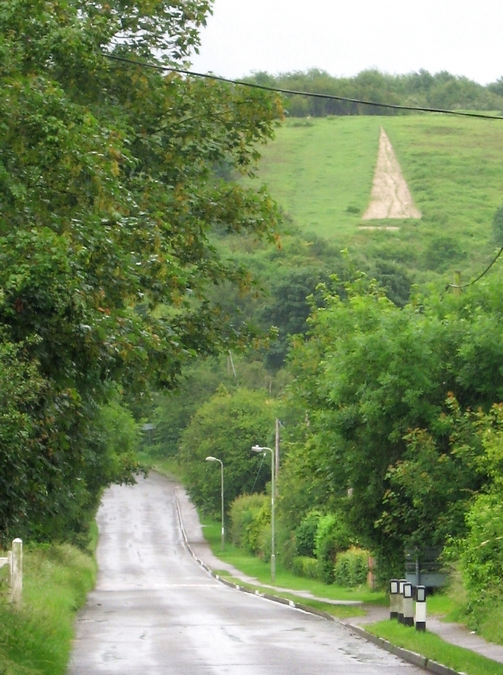
View from Watlington towards the White Mark on Watlington Hill

== Churches ==
=== Church of England ===
The oldest parts of the Church of England parish church of St Leonard are Norman, including a diapered tympanum that was over the north door until this was dismantled for the building of the north aisle. The church was extensively rebuilt in the 14th century, and the arcade of the south aisle survives from this period. The south chapel is 15th century, built for Maud Warner as a memorial for her husband Richard, a woolman. The tower is also Medieval. A few Decorated Gothic and Perpendicular Gothic windows survive, but in the 1870s some were moved to different positions within the church. In 1763 Edward Horne, a local landowner, obtained permission to build a burial vault east of the Warner chapel and south of the chancel. In 1877 the architects H.J. Tollit and Edwin Dolby restored St Leonard's. The church is a Grade II* listed building.

The west tower had a ring of six bells until 1909, when two recently cast ones were hung and increased it to eight. Henry I Knight of Reading, Berkshire cast the fourth bell in 1587. Ellis I Knight cast the sixth bell in 1635. Henry II Knight cast the third and fifth bells in 1663. Charles and John Rudhall of Gloucester cast the seventh bell in 1785. Mears and Stainbank of the Whitechapel Bell Foundry cast the tenor bell in 1869 and the treble and second bells in 1905. St Leonard's parish is now part of the Benefice of Icknield, along with the parishes of Britwell Salome, Pyrton and Swyncombe.

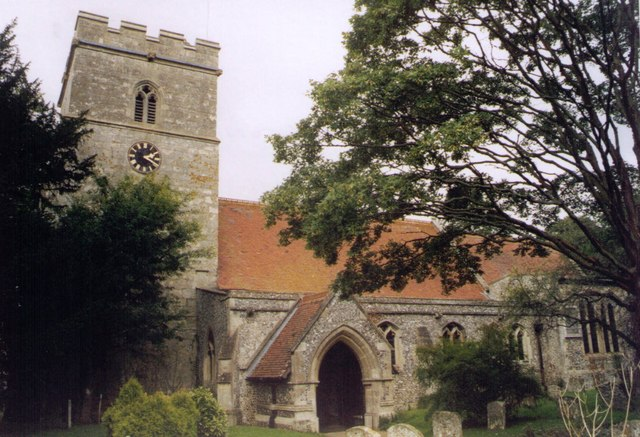
St Leonard's parish church

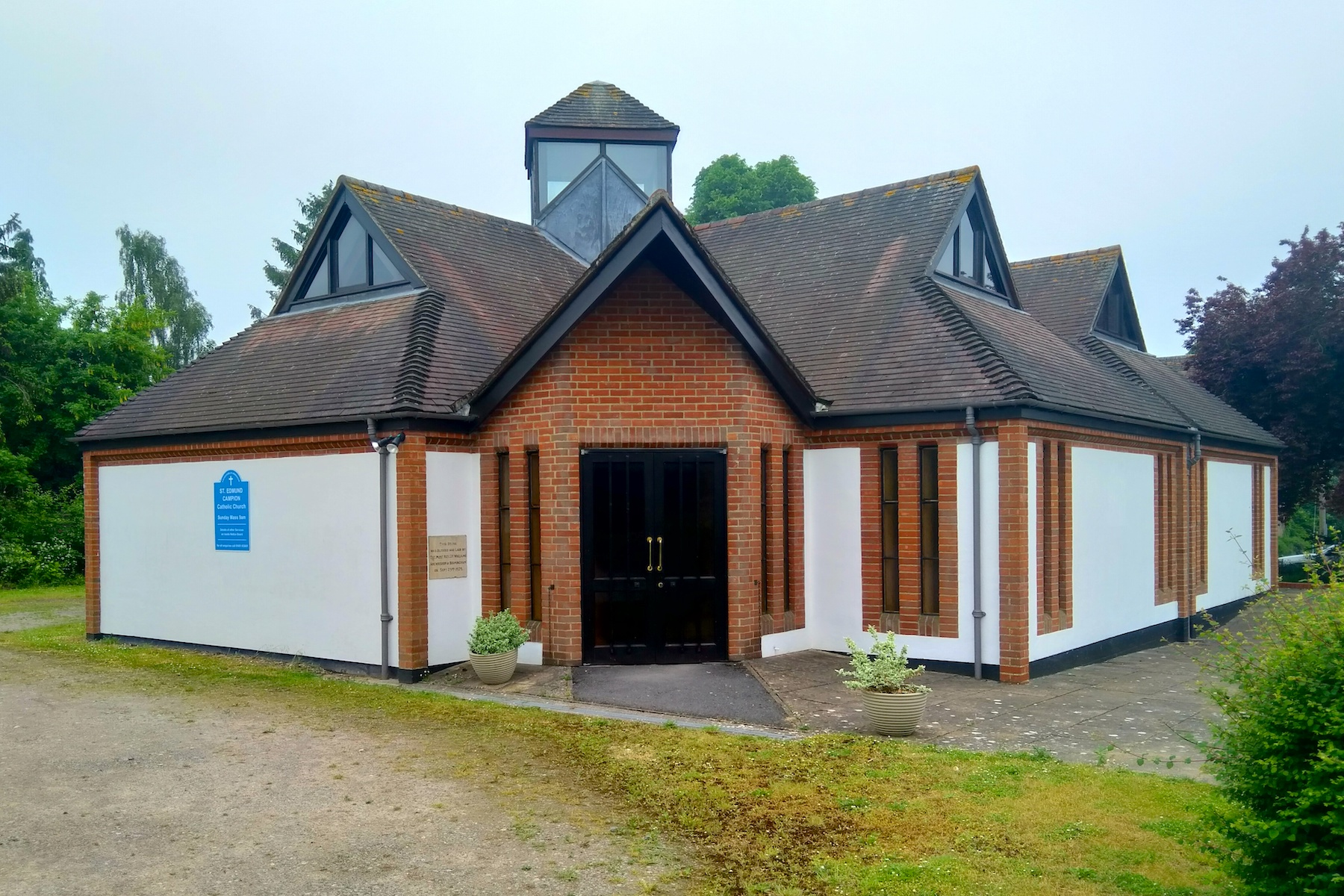
St Edmund Campion Roman Catholic church

=== Roman Catholic ===
During the English Reformation Oxfordshire had numerous recusant Roman Catholics. In 1549 William Grey, 13th Baron Grey de Wilton was sent to Oxfordshire with 1,500 troops to enforce the Reformation. Grey ordered William Boolar, a Catholic of Watlington, to be hanged as an example. Despite persecution, a number of local landowning families including the Stonors remained Catholic, and they and their chaplains supported small numbers of other Catholics in the area. In 1930 Fr. William Brown, the chaplain at Stonor Park, brought about the building of the Roman Catholic church of the Sacred Heart in Watlington. The present Roman Catholic church in Watlington is dedicated to St Edmund Campion, a Jesuit priest who was executed at Tyburn in 1581.

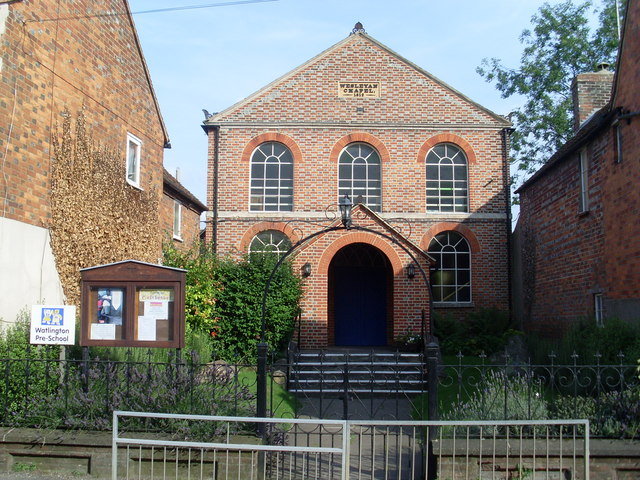
Watlington Methodist church

=== Non-conformist ===
During the 17th and 18th centuries several nonconformist denominations existed in Watlington, with Quakers, Baptists and Seventh Day Baptists most prominent in different periods. Methodist preachers visited Watlington by invitation from 1764, with John Wesley himself preaching in the town in 1766, 1774 and 1775. The current Wesleyan chapel was built in 1812, and now forms part of the Oxford Methodist Circuit.

== Education ==
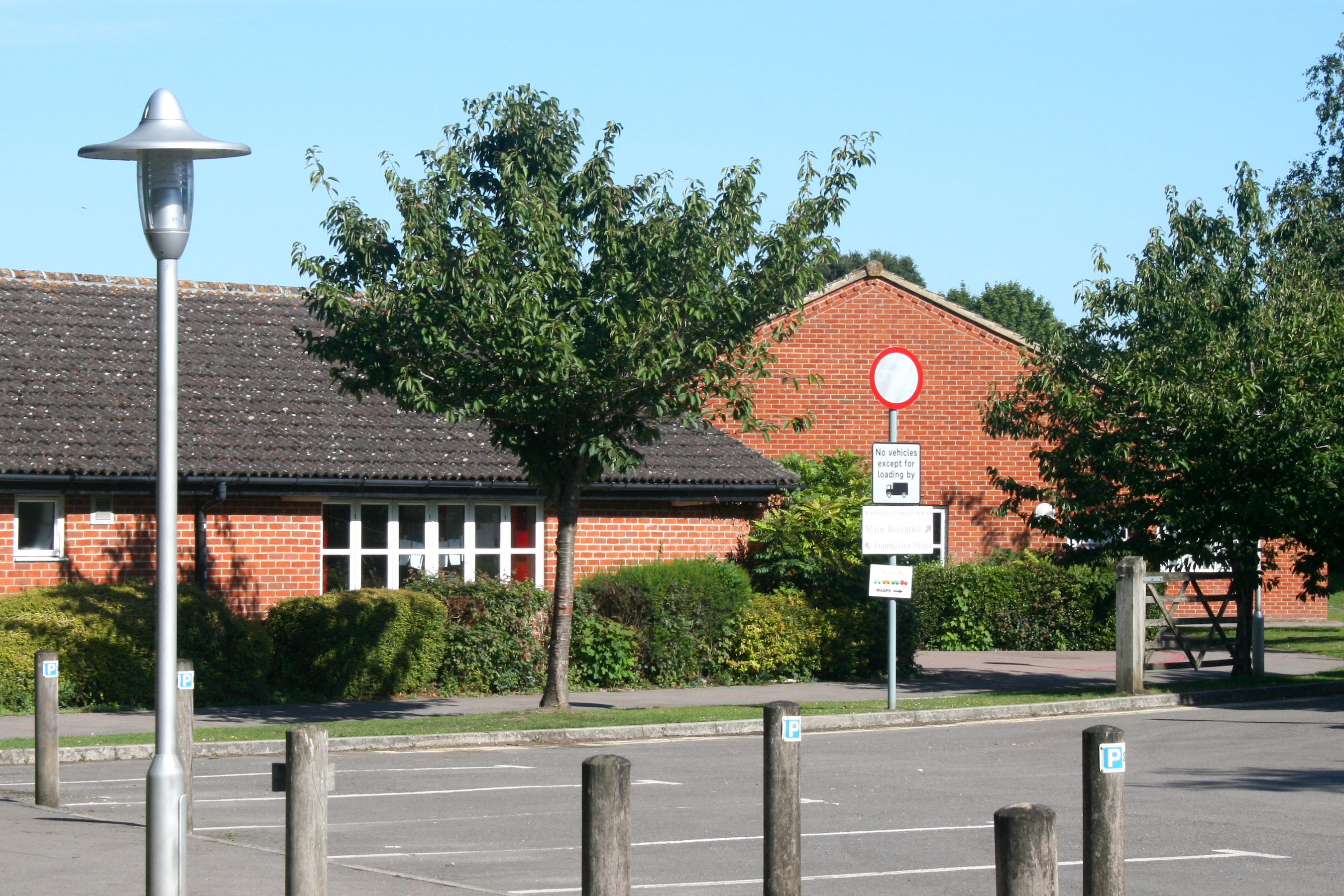
Watlington Primary School

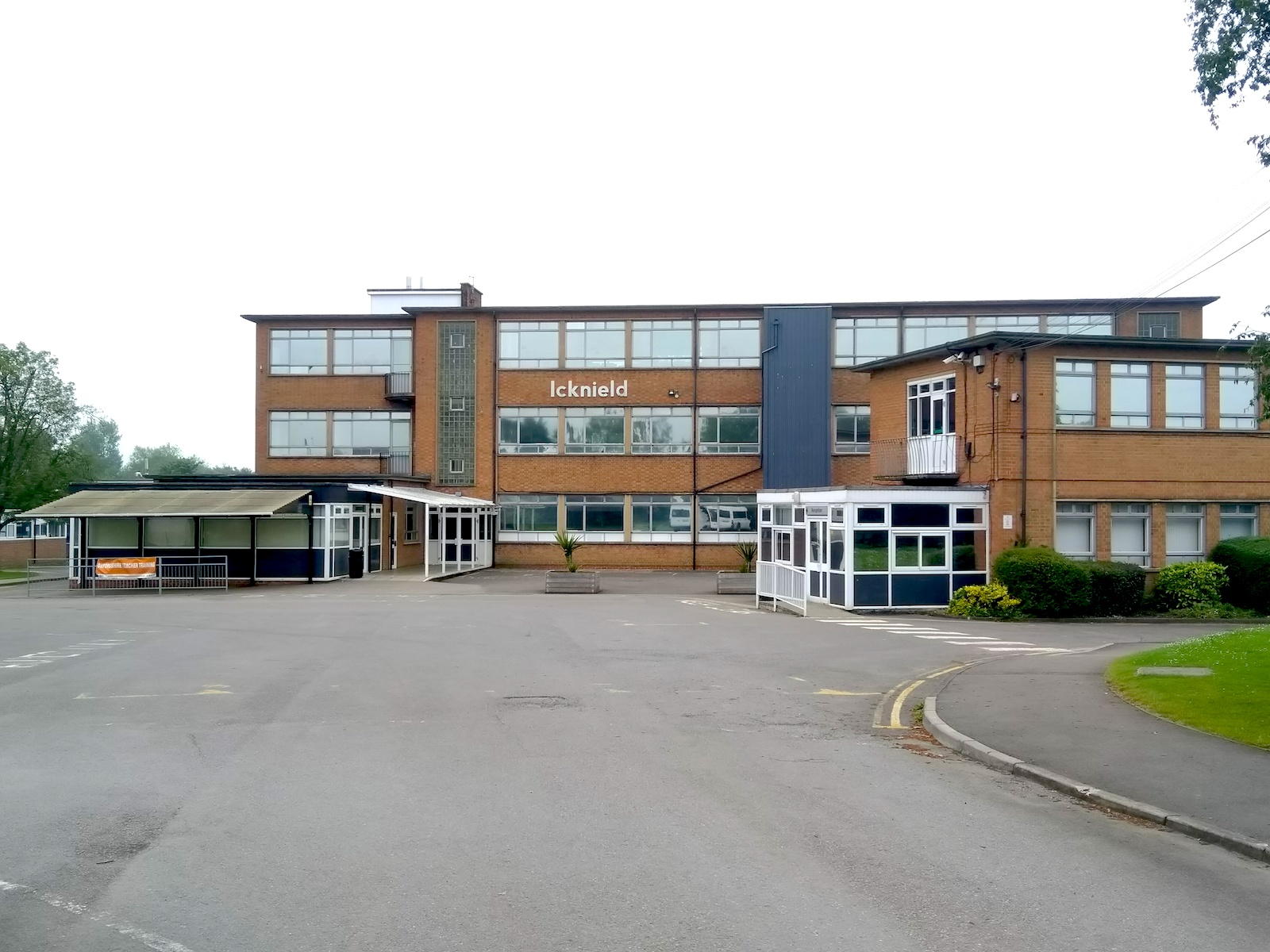
Icknield Community College

Early years and primary education in Watlington is provided by Watlington Primary School, first opened in 1874. Lower secondary education for students up to the age of 16 from Watlington and many of the surrounding villages is provided by Icknield Community College, a mixed-sex comprehensive school. Icknield Community College does not provide sixth form education, and instead works with three partnership schools in the area, Henley College in Henley-on-Thames, Lord Williams's School in Thame, and Wallingford School in Wallingford, as well as sending students to many other sixth forms and colleges in the area.

== Media ==
Local news and television programmes are provided by BBC South and ITV Meridian. Television signals are received from the Oxford TV transmitter. Local radio stations are BBC Radio Oxford on 95.2 FM, Heart South on 102.6 FM, and Greatest Hits Radio South (formerly Jack FM) on 106.4 FM. The town is served by the local newspapers, Henley Standard and Oxfordshire Guardian.

== Amenities ==
Watlington Town FC is a Non-League football club. Its first team plays in North Berks Football League Division 1. Watlington has a cricket club. Its first eleven plays in Oxfordshire Cricket Association League Division 2. The Watlington Club (previously the Watlington Memorial Club) provides facilities for the sports of tennis, squash and lawn bowls. Watlington has a Women's Institute.

== Notable people ==
- Decathlete Peter Gabbett was born in Watlington in 1941.
- Actors Jeremy Irons and Sinéad Cusack have a home in Watlington.
- Carry-on star Julian Holloway (1944-2025) was born in Watlington.
- Eric Parkin, pianist, at Greengates Cottage, High Street.
- First World War Royal Naval veteran Bill Stone lived in Watlington until he was 106.

== Twinning ==
Watlington is twinned with Mansle, in southwestern France.

== In popular culture ==
Five episodes of the TV series Midsomer Murders have been filmed partly in Watlington, with the library as 'Midsomer Library'. At least one episode of the TV series Inspector Morse was filmed partly in Watlington, with the nearby Shirburn Castle appearing as the Balcombe family home in the episode Happy Families. The 2014 film Fury, starring Brad Pitt, was partly filmed in and near Watlington. The pivotal balloon-accident-scene in the opening chapter of the novel Enduring Love by Ian McEwan takes place on an escarpment of the Chiltern Hills above Watlington.

== Transport ==
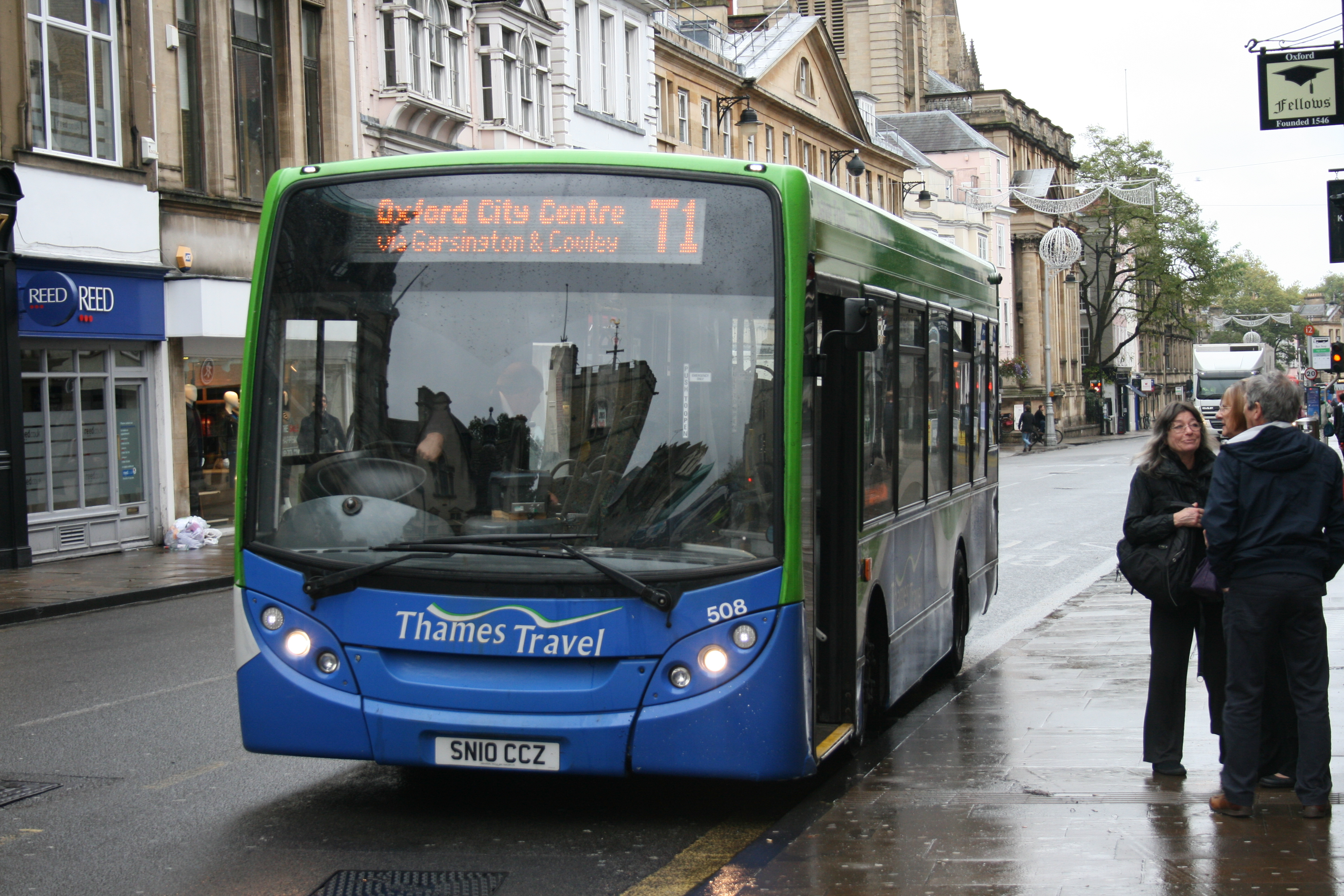
A Thames Travel bus on route T1 arrives in Oxford from Watlington

The M40 motorway is about 2 1/2 miles (4 km) from Watlington, with access at junctions 5 and 6. There are frequent coach services to Oxford and London, and to London's Heathrow and Gatwick airports, from M40 junction 6 at nearby Lewknor. Bus routes serving Watlington have been reduced in the 2010s because of funding cuts by Oxfordshire County Council. Earlier services to Thame, Wallingford and Reading have been discontinued. The only remaining service is the Oxford Bus Company service city11 between Watlington and Oxford.

In 1872 the Watlington & Princes Risborough Railway was opened. Its Watlington terminus is in fact in Pyrton parish, 1/2 mile (800 m) from Watlington. In 1883 the Great Western Railway took over control of the line. In 1957 British Railways closed Watlington station and withdrew all passenger services between Watlington and Chinnor, which was still being used by the local Chinnor Cement Works. In 1961 British Railways withdrew all services from the line, the track was lifted and the line left abandoned. Watlington railway station site remains, as does the station building, the corrugated iron carriage shed, and the brickwork of the goods shed.

== See also ==
- Chiltern Hills
- Red kite
- Chalgrove Brook
- Christmas Common
- Watlington Park
- Shirburn
- Category:People from Watlington, Oxfordshire

== Sources ==
- Lobel, Mary D, ed. (1964). A History of the County of Oxford. Victoria County History. Vol. 8: Lewknor and Pyrton Hundreds. London: Oxford University Press for the Institute of Historical Research. pp. 210–252.
- Nugent-Grenville, George (1854). Some memorials of John Hampden: his party and his times. London: Chapman & Hall. p. 359. "Watlington."
- Oppitz, Leslie (2000). Lost Railways of the Chilterns. Newbury: Countryside Books. pp. 20–23. ISBN 1-85306-643-5.
- Sherwood, Jennifer; Pevsner, Nikolaus (1974). Oxfordshire. The Buildings of England. Harmondsworth: Penguin Books. pp. 829–832. ISBN 0-14-071045-0.
- Stow, W (1722). Remarks on London, being an Exact Survey of the Cities of London and Westminster, Borough of Southwark. London.
