= Edward Horne =

English clergyman and cricketer

Edward Larkin Horne (22 April 1835 – 5 February 1908) was an English clergyman. He was also a cricketer who played first-class cricket for Cambridge University and Cambridge Town Club, known sometimes as "Cambridgeshire". He was born in London and died at Whissendine in Rutland.

Captain of cricket at Shrewsbury School in 1854, Horne appeared for Cambridge University between 1855 and 1858 in eight matches that have subsequently been designated as first-class, playing as an all-rounder: a lower order batsman and a bowler. Three of his matches were the University matches against Oxford University in 1855, 1857 and 1858; his record in these games was not distinguished, but in other matches, he twice took six wickets in an innings. He also played once in a first-class match for Cambridgeshire in 1858 during that team's fleeting status as one of the first-class counties.

== Career after university ==
Horne graduated as the 35th Wrangler from Clare College, Cambridge in 1858 and was then ordained as a priest in the Church of England. He was vicar of Whissendine in Rutland from 1864 until he retired in 1906; he remained in the village and died there two years later.
