= White House Christmas tree =

Christmas tree inside the White House in Washington, DC, United States

Coordinates: 38.8975°N 77.0365°W

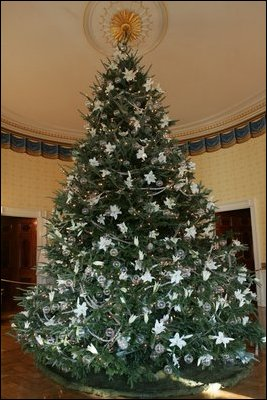
The 2005 Christmas Tree in the White House's Blue Room

The White House Christmas Tree, also known as the Blue Room Christmas Tree, is the official indoor Christmas tree at the residence of the president of the United States, the White House. The first indoor Christmas tree was installed in the White House sometime in the 19th century (there are varying claims as to the exact year) and since 1961 the tree has had a themed motif at the discretion of the first lady of the United States.

== History ==
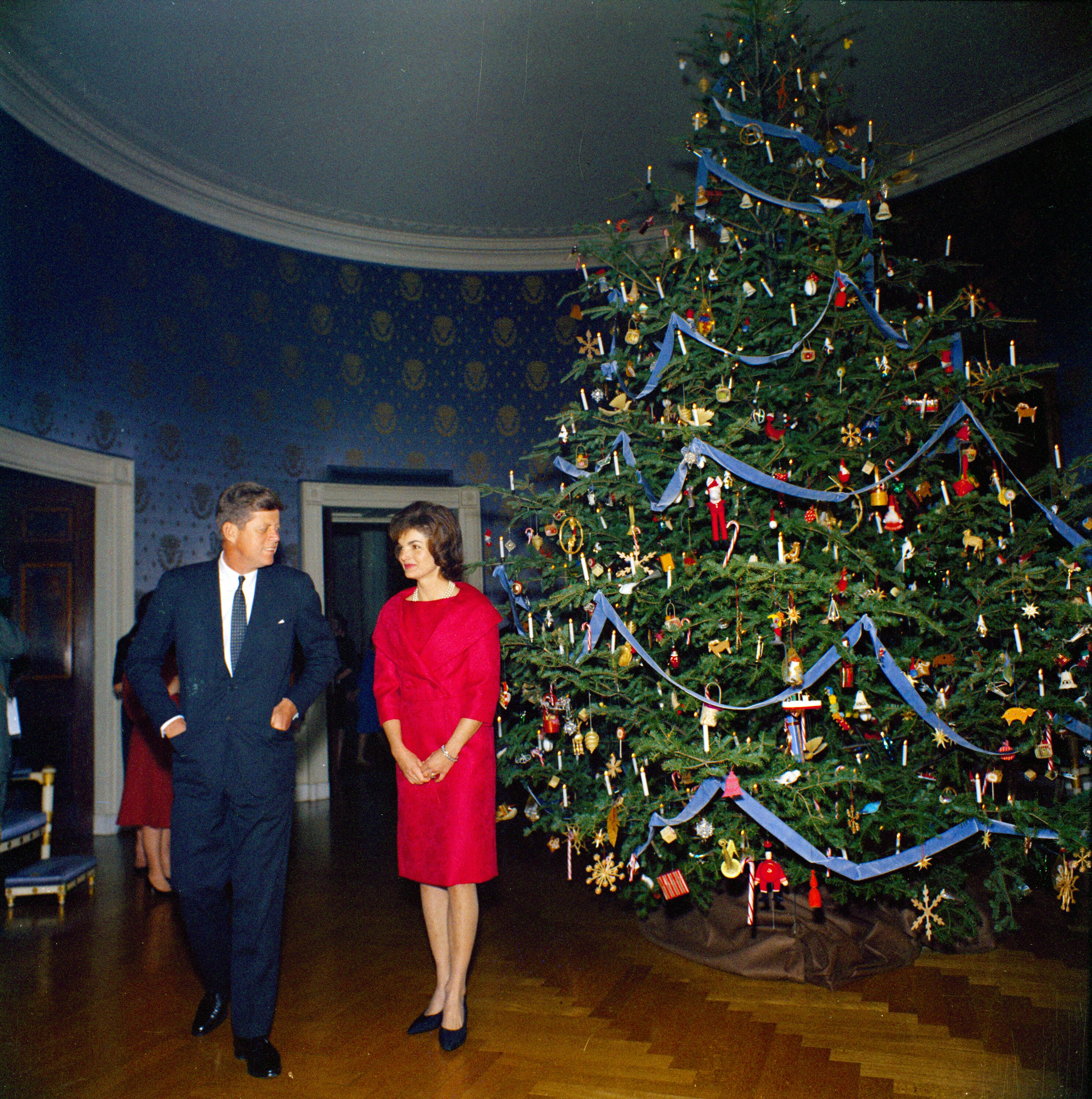
President John F. Kennedy and First Lady Jacqueline Kennedy with the first themed Blue Room tree in 1961.

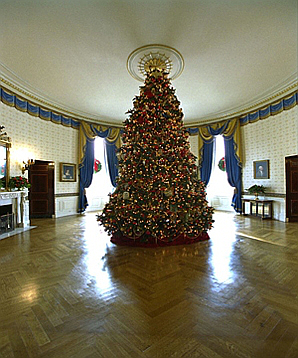
The 2002 Blue Room Christmas tree.

=== First tree ===
There are two claims to the "first" genuine White House Christmas tree. President Franklin Pierce is said to have had the first indoor Christmas tree at the White House during the 1850s, variously reported as 1853 or 1856. More credible sources state that it was, in fact, President Benjamin Harrison who had the first indoor tree (either in 1888, 1889, or 1891). First Lady Caroline Harrison helped decorate the tree, which was installed in the second floor oval parlor, today's Yellow Oval Room. There is an 1880 reference to President John Tyler in the 1840s, hosting a children's party at which there was a Christmas tree with gifts.

=== General ===
Following the Harrison administration indoor trees were not always used at the White House. First Lady Lou Henry Hoover began the tradition of presidential wives decorating the White House tree with the first "official" White House Christmas tree in 1929. In 1961, First Lady Jacqueline Kennedy began the tradition of selecting a theme for the White House Christmas tree by decorating with a Nutcracker motif.

=== Years without a tree ===
As stated, there were years where no indoor White House Christmas tree was installed at all. It is verifiable that there was no Christmas tree in the White House in 1902, 1904, 1907, and 1922. The lack of a tree in 1902 was due to the fact that President Theodore Roosevelt had not ordered one by December 23.

Additionally, other presidents never displayed a tree in the White House. First U.S. president George Washington held office at a time when there was no White House, thus it is impossible for him to have displayed a tree there. There is no evidence that Abraham Lincoln ever displayed a Christmas tree in the White House. In 1922, First Lady Florence Harding's illness led to a more subdued Christmas celebration at the White House and no Christmas tree.

=== Controversy ===
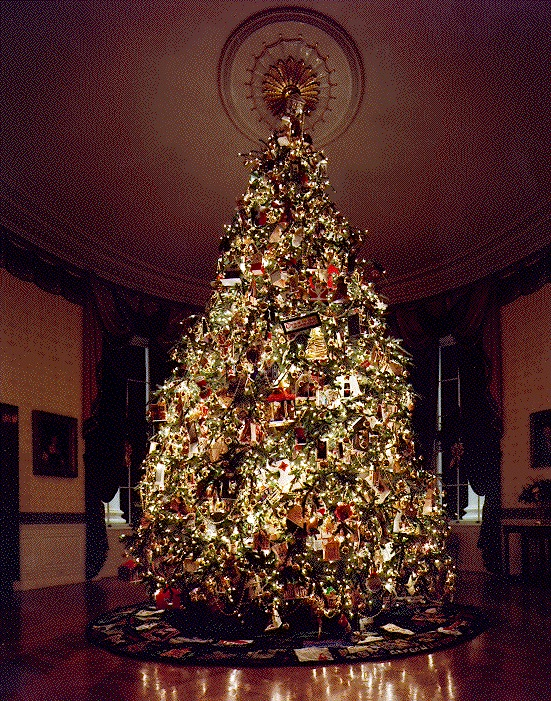
The 1995 Blue Room Christmas tree – one of its ornaments was a source of political controversy for some.

In 1899 the White House of President William McKinley received letters urging the president to forgo participation in the "Christmas tree habit". The letter writers, which the Chicago Daily Tribune noted had taken up the "forestry fad", referred to "arboreal infanticide", according to the Tribune. Those opposed to a tree in the White House that year also termed Christmas trees "un-American" because it was a historically German tradition. At least one tree was displayed in the White House that year, in the kitchen department, for the maids.

The Nixon administration's choice of tree topper, the atomic symbol of peace rather than a traditional star, was criticized.

The 1995 Blue Room Christmas tree sought ornaments made by architecture students from across the United States. Contest winner Rene Spineto designed an ornament that depicted two stockings, one marked "Bill" filled with candy and presents, and the other marked "Newt" filled with coal. The Clinton administration hung the ornament on the tree without censorship.

In his 1998 book Unlimited Access, published by conservative publishing house Regnery Publishing, former FBI agent Gary Aldrich claimed that the Clinton administration decorated the 1994 White House Christmas Tree with condoms and drug paraphernalia. George Stephanopoulos called the book a "work of fiction"; it has also been called "infamous".

In 2008, one of the ornaments designed by a Seattle artist, Deborah Lawrence, was rejected for inclusion on the Blue Room Christmas Tree. The rejected ornament was a red and white striped 9-inch (23 cm) ball with the words "Impeach Bush" emblazoned on it. The ornament was the only one of about 370 submitted that was rejected.

== Tree ==
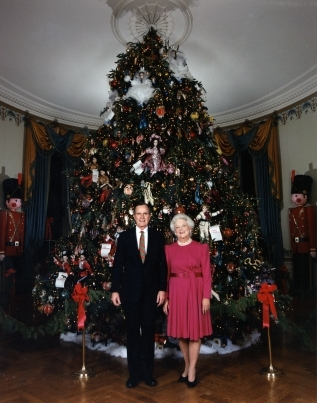
President George H.W. Bush and First Lady Barbara Bush with the official White House Christmas tree in 1990.

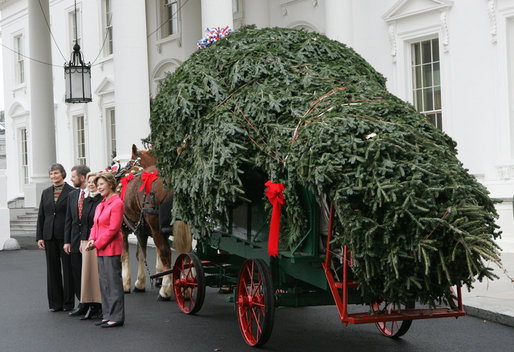
The 2007 Blue Room Christmas tree arrives by horse-drawn carriage

=== Description ===
The White House Christmas tree is selected from various growers nationwide. Growers in the state of North Carolina have provided 16 trees, more than any other state. The state of Pennsylvania has the second-highest total of trees provided for the White House with 11, as of 2024. The White House Christmas tree has been displayed in the Blue Room many times since 1961. It has also occasionally been displayed in the Entrance Hall.

Generally, there is more than one Christmas tree in and around the White House, for instance, in 1997 there were 36, in 2008 there were 27. Traditionally, the tree in the Blue Room is the official White House Christmas tree. The White House Christmas tree usually stands nearly 20 feet (6.1 m) tall and the crystal chandelier in the Blue Room must be removed for the tree to fit the room. Frequently, the tree's height is reported as 18 feet (5.5 m) or 18.5 feet (5.6 m) tall. The Blue Room tree is donated each year by the National Christmas Tree Association (NCTA). The NCTA has donated the tree since 1966; it is chosen through a contest among members of the trade group.

=== Official list (1961–2026) ===
Image	Year	Species and location grown	Ornamentation notes	First Lady	Location	Theme
	2026	Concolor fir, Endeavor, Wisconsin		Melania Trump	Blue Room	
	2025	Concolor fir, Sidney Township, Michigan	The 2025 White House Christmas theme illuminates the heartfelt character of America within the People's House. The First Lady's creative inspiration is drawn from the joys, challenges, and frequent motion derived from motherhood and business. In the Blue Room, the official White House Christmas Tree commemorates Gold Star Families with gold stars and ornaments representing the official bird and flower of every U.S. state and territory—a tribute to the resilience, bravery, and sacrifice of our military personnel and their families.	Melania Trump	Blue Room	Home is Where the Heart Is
	2024	Fraser fir, Newland, North Carolina	Each room and design element throughout the White House holiday display encourages guests to embrace the peace and light of the holiday season. The stunning tree features a light-filled, whimsical carousel, with names of every state, territory, and the District of Columbia, showcased throughout the tree’s décor. With bright lights, vivid colors, and three-dimensional holiday candy treats, guests will gaze in wonder as they are taken on a delightful adventure around the tree.	Jill Biden	Blue Room	A "Season of Peace and Light"
	2023	Fraser fir, Fleetwood, North Carolina	The 2023 White House Holiday Display is designed to capture the pure, unfiltered delight and imagination of childhood, to encourage visitors to reflect on this time of year with hearts open to the magic, wonder, and joy of the season. The stunning tree celebrates cheerful scenes, landscapes, and neighborhoods from all across the country, with names of every state, territory, and the District of Columbia, showcased throughout the decor. With bright colors and three-dimensional elements, guests will gaze in wonder as they are taken on a delightful adventure around the tree. A replica of a vintage passenger train, on loan from the Train Collectors Association, magically weaves through the tree’s base.	Jill Biden	Blue Room	Magic, Wonder, and Joy
	2022	Concolor fir, Auburn, Pennsylvania	This year's holidays at the White House capture the spirit embodied in the very idea of America: We the People. The People's House's rooms are full of history and holiday décor and the mirrored ornaments and reflective lights, make you feel at home and find yourself in the great story of America. The official White House Christmas tree includes handmade renderings of the official birds from all 57 states, territories, and the District of Columbia.	Jill Biden	Blue Room	We the People
	2021	Fraser fir, Jefferson, North Carolina	This year's theme is inspired by the small acts of kindness and experiences that lifted America's spirits this year and throughout the COVID-19 pandemic. The Blue Room, featuring the Official White House Christmas Tree, celebrates the Gift of Peace and Unity. Cascading down the tree, peace doves carry a shimmering banner embossed with the names of each state and territory of the United States, reminding us all of the importance of unity and national harmony.	Jill Biden	Blue Room	Gifts from the Heart
	2020	Fraser fir, Shepherdstown, West Virginia	Students across the country were asked to artistically depict what makes their state beautiful by highlighting the people, places, and things that capture the spirit of their state. Glistening on the branches of this Fraser fir, their mini masterpieces collectively showcase America.	Melania Trump	Blue Room	America the Beautiful
	2019	Douglas fir, Pitman, Pennsylvania	The decorations celebrate the courageous individuals who have shaped the country and kept the American spirit alive. This year's official Christmas tree paid homage to the distinctive floral emblem of every state and territory.	Melania Trump	Blue Room	The Spirit of America
	2018	Fraser fir, Newland, North Carolina	The official White House Christmas tree was trimmed with blue velvet ribbon embroidered in gold with each state and territory. The theme displays many splendors found across the United States.	Melania Trump	Blue Room	American Treasures
	2017	Balsam fir, Endeavor, Wisconsin	The Blue Room tree was decorated with glass ornaments depicting the seal of each state and territory. The theme pays respect to 200 years of holiday traditions at the White House.	Melania Trump	Blue Room	Time-Honored Traditions
	2016	Douglas fir, Oconto, Wisconsin	This Blue Room tree celebrates "We the People". It is decorated with ribbon garland featuring iconic words of the Preamble to the United States Constitution. Ornaments featured images of American families, farmers, and service members, reflecting the United States by diversity and strengthened by a shared spirit of hope and optimism.	Michelle Obama	Blue Room	The Gift of the Holidays
	2015	Fraser fir, Lehighton, Pennsylvania	The Blue Room tree was "dedicated to our nation's service members, veterans, and their families, it is ornamented with holiday messages of hope for our troops and patriotic symbols of red, white, and blue."	Michelle Obama	Blue Room	A Timeless Tradition
	2014	Concolor fir, Lehighton, Pennsylvania	The Blue Room Tree had a theme within the overall theme - "America the Brave". Ornaments were made by children on U.S. military bases worldwide. The ornaments included many thank-you cards from children to members of the U.S. military.	Michelle Obama	Blue Room	A Children's Winter Wonderland
	2013	Douglas fir, Lehighton, Pennsylvania	Ornaments paid tribute to military families. Children living on military bases contributed greeting cards in the shape of their home state. Those were hung from the tree along with round ornaments that silhouetted each state and territory.	Michelle Obama	Blue Room	Gather Around: Stories of the Season
	2012	Fraser fir, Jefferson, North Carolina	Tree dedicated to U.S. military members, veterans and their families. Ornaments were decorated by children living on U.S. military bases worldwide.	Michelle Obama	Blue Room	Joy to All
	2011	Balsam fir, Neshkoro, Wisconsin	Medals, badges, and patches from all of the military branches were displayed on ornaments.	Michelle Obama	Blue Room	Shine, Give, Share
	2010	Douglas fir, Lehighton, Pennsylvania	The Blue Room tree had a specific theme within the overall theme – "Gift of the American Spirit." It honored state and county fairs and featured prize ribbons from each state and territory.	Michelle Obama	Blue Room	"Simple Gifts"
	2009	Douglas fir, Shepherdstown, West Virginia	"We took about 800 ornaments left over from previous administrations, we sent them to 60 local community groups throughout the country, and asked them to decorate them to pay tribute to a favorite local landmark and then send them back to us for display here at the White House."	Michelle Obama	Blue Room	Reflect, Rejoice, Renew
	2008	Fraser fir, Crumpler, North Carolina	Ornaments designed by artists from around the country selected by members of Congress. The ornaments had a patriotic theme.	Laura Bush	Blue Room	A Red, White, and Blue Christmas
	2007	Fraser fir, Laurel Springs, North Carolina	Each ornament represented one of the 391 National Park Service sites.	Laura Bush	Blue Room	Holiday in the National Parks
	2006	Douglas fir, Lehighton, Pennsylvania	Crystals and ornaments of iridescent glass	Laura Bush	Blue Room	Deck the Halls and Welcome All
	2005	Fraser fir, Laurel Springs, North Carolina	White lilies, crystal spheres and light-catching garland	Laura Bush	Blue Room	All Things Bright and Beautiful
	2004	Noble fir, Rochester, Washington	Musical instruments hand-painted by members of the Society of Decorative Painters.	Laura Bush	Blue Room	A Season of Merriment and Melody
	2003	Fraser fir, Endeavor, Wisconsin	The tree features ornaments first used by Barbara Bush in 1989.	Laura Bush	Blue Room	A Season of Stories
	2002	Noble fir, Elma, Washington	An artist from each state designed an ornament based on a native bird.	Laura Bush	Blue Room	All Creatures Great and Small
	2001	Concolor fir, Middleburg, Pennsylvania	An artist from each state designed miniature replicas of historic houses from their region.	Laura Bush	Blue Room	Home for the Holidays
	2000	Douglas fir, Auburn, Pennsylvania	Ornaments were from the First Lady's past.	Hillary Clinton	Blue Room	Holiday Reflections
	1999	Noble fir, Elma, Washington	Doll makers fashioned toys of American historical figures for this tree.	Hillary Clinton	Blue Room	Holiday Treasures at the White House
	1998	Balsam fir, Endeavor, Wisconsin	Knitting Guild of America and the Society of Decorative Painters worked together with fabric artists from each state on the ornaments.	Hillary Clinton	Blue Room	Winter Wonderland
	1997	Fraser fir, Grassy Creek, North Carolina	Members of the National Needlework Association and Council of Fashion Designers of America joined with glass artisans to design the trimmings.	Hillary Clinton	Blue Room	Santa's Workshop
	1996	Colorado blue spruce, Coshocton, Ohio	Woodcraft artisans and professional ballet companies helped with the ornaments.	Hillary Clinton	Blue Room	Nutcracker Suite
	1995	Fraser fir, North Carolina	Ornaments contributed by American architecture students and members of the American Institute of Architects.	Hillary Clinton	Blue Room	A Visit From St. Nicholas
	1994	Blue spruce, Missouri	Ornaments contributed by American art students.	Hillary Clinton	Blue Room	The Twelve Days of Christmas
	1993	Fraser fir, North Carolina	More than 1,000 artists contributed angel-themed ornaments.	Hillary Clinton	Blue Room	Angels
	1992	Grand fir, Oregon	White House florists made 88 gift-giving characters.	Barbara Bush	Blue Room	Gift-givers
	1991	Noble fir, Salem, Oregon	Saintly Stitchers of St. Martin’s Episcopal Church in Houston created a needlepoint village and 92 pieces for a White House staff built Noah's Ark.	Barbara Bush	Blue Room	Needle work tree
	1990	Fraser fir, North Carolina	Used miniature porcelain dancers.	Barbara Bush	Blue Room	Nutcracker Suite
	1989	Fraser fir, Pennsylvania	White House staff created 80 soft-sculpture literary characters.	Barbara Bush	Blue Room	Family literacy
	1988	Balsam fir, Montello, Wisconsin	Reused hand-blown glass ornaments from the Eisenhower administration, and reused Nixon's state flower balls. White House carpenters made 300 wood candles.	Nancy Reagan	Blue Room	Old-fashioned tree
	1987	Fraser fir, Shepherdstown, West Virginia	Miniature instruments, notes and sheet music made by patients at Second Genesis, drug-treatment program.	Nancy Reagan	Blue Room	Musical theme
	1986	Fraser fir, Washington	15 soft-sculpture nursery rhyme scenes and 100 geese made by patients at Second Genesis, drug-treatment program.	Nancy Reagan	Blue Room	Mother Goose theme
	1985	Fraser fir, Lansing, North Carolina	1,500 Ornaments made by patients at Second Genesis, drug-treatment program.	Nancy Reagan	Blue Room	Ornaments made from Christmas cards sent to the Reagans in 1984
	1984	Blue spruce, Manton, Michigan	Ornaments made by patients at Second Genesis, drug-treatment program.	Nancy Reagan	Blue Room	Ornaments made from plant material and other handcrafted natural ornaments.
	1983	Noble fir, Orting, Washington	Reused 1982 ornaments and added old-fashioned toys lent by Margaret Woodbury Strong Museum.	Nancy Reagan	Blue Room	Old-Fashioned toys
	1982	Fraser fir, Lansing, North Carolina	Ornaments made by patients at the Second Genesis, drug-treatment program.	Nancy Reagan	Blue Room	Foil paper cones and metallic snowflakes
	1981	Douglas fir, Spartansburg, Pennsylvania	Nancy Reagan's first tree did not involve Second Genesis. The ornaments were loaned by the Museum of American Folk Art.	Nancy Reagan	Blue Room	Ornaments from the Museum of American Folk Art.
	1980	Douglas fir, Bristol, Indiana	Dolls, hats, fans, tapestries, and laces.	Rosalynn Carter	Blue Room	Victorian theme
	1979	Douglas fir, West Virginia	Corcoran School of Art created ornaments from balsa wood, fabric and dried flowers.	Rosalynn Carter	Blue Room	American folk art of the colonial period
	1978	Veitch fir, New York	Victorian dolls and miniature furniture lent by the Margaret Woodbury Strong Museum.	Rosalynn Carter	Blue Room	Antique toys
	1977	Noble fir, Washington	National Association for Retarded Citizens made eggshell ornaments.	Rosalynn Carter	Blue Room	Painted milkweed pods, nut pods, foil, and eggshell ornaments
	1976	Balsam fir, Wisconsin	Natural ornaments made by the Garden Club of America.	Betty Ford	Blue Room	"Love that is the spirit of Christmas"
	1975	Douglas fir, New York	Used ornaments from 1974 plus experts from Colonial Williamsburg made ornaments from paper snowflakes, acorns, dried fruits, pine-cones, vegetables, straw, cookies and yarn.	Betty Ford	Blue Room	Old-fashioned children's Christmas
	1974	Concolor fir, Mayville, Michigan	Ornaments made by Appalachian women and senior citizens groups.	Betty Ford	Blue Room	Handmade crafts, thrift and recycling
	1973	Fraser fir, North Carolina	In honor of James Monroe	Pat Nixon	Blue Room	Gold theme
	1972	Noble fir, Washington	Reused 1969 ornaments, added 3,000 pastel satin finish balls, and 150 gold federal stars.	Pat Nixon	Blue Room	Still Life with Fruit and Nature’s Bounty, paintings by Severin Roesen
	1971	Fraser fir, North Carolina	Reused 1969 ornaments, added Monroe fans, and gold foil angels.	Pat Nixon	Blue Room	American Flower Tree
	1970	White spruce, Wisconsin	Reused 1969 ornaments, added 53 Monroe fans.	Pat Nixon	Blue Room	American Flower Tree
	1969	Blue spruce, Ohio	Disabled workers from Florida made velvet and satin balls featuring each state's state flower.	Pat Nixon	North Entrance	American Flower Tree
	1968	Eastern white pine, Indianapolis	19th century American style with gingerbread cookies.	Claudia 'Lady Bird' Johnson	Blue Room	19th century gingerbread tree
	1967	Blue spruce, Ohio	Same as 1965–66 but with silver baubles, silver stars, and round mirrors added.	Claudia 'Lady Bird' Johnson	Blue Room	Early American
	1966	Balsam fir, Wisconsin	Traditional ornaments: nuts, fruit, popcorn, dried seedpods, gingerbread cookies and wood roses from Hawaii.	Claudia 'Lady Bird' Johnson	Blue Room	Early American
	1965		Traditional ornaments: nuts, fruit, popcorn, dried seedpods, gingerbread cookies and wood roses from Hawaii.	Claudia 'Lady Bird' Johnson	Blue Room	Early American
	1964	Balsam fir		Claudia 'Lady Bird' Johnson	Blue Room	
	1963		The tree was very subdued as the nation mourned John F. Kennedy's assassination.	Claudia 'Lady Bird' Johnson	Blue Room	
	1962		Reused ornaments from 1961 plus other ornaments made by disabled and senior citizens.	Jacqueline Kennedy	North Entrance	Childhood
	1961	Balsam fir	Toys, birds, and angels modeled after Tchaikovsky’s Nutcracker Suite ballet.	Jacqueline Kennedy	Blue Room	Nutcracker Suite

=== Other known White House Christmas trees ===
Year	Species and location grown	General notes	First Lady	Location	Theme (if any)
1960		"Presents were piled high under the magnificent tree and stretched for yards into the East Room."	Mamie Eisenhower	East Room	
1959		Of the 26 trees there were trees in the laundry room, the maid's sitting room and David Eisenhower had his own private tree in the children's quarters.	Mamie Eisenhower	26 trees throughout the White House	
1958		". . . decorated with electric candle lights, glass balls and large amounts of tinsel."	Mamie Eisenhower	27 trees throughout the White House	
1957			Mamie Eisenhower	East Room	
1955			Mamie Eisenhower	East Room	
1954		Silver tinsel, Eisenhower grandchildren opened presents under this tree.	Mamie Eisenhower	East Room	
1947			Bess Truman	East Room	
1944		Elliott Roosevelt: ". . . the Christmas tree was in place and decorated, the piles of presents were ready for the unwrapping – each person's pile heaped on a separate chair."	Eleanor Roosevelt	Family quarters	
1939			Eleanor Roosevelt	East Room	
1937		". . . gleamed with snow and silver trimming."	Eleanor Roosevelt	East Room	
1936			Eleanor Roosevelt	East Room	
1934		Multiple trees were installed in the White House, some for public viewing and others for private enjoyment of the Roosevelts. A large tree was installed in the White House East Room.	Eleanor Roosevelt	East Room	
1929		First "official" White House tree.	Lou Henry Hoover		
1926		Mrs. Coolidge chose to display three Christmas trees at the White House.	Grace Coolidge		
1923	Norway spruce	White House had two Christmas trees.	Grace Coolidge	Blue Room, and family quarters	
1917			Edith Bolling Galt Wilson		
1916			Edith Bolling Galt Wilson	Library The tree was for Wilson's great niece Josephine Cothran.	
1915		Laden with gifts from members of the family and household.	Edith Bolling Galt Wilson	Library	
1914			none	White House library	
1912			Helen Taft	Blue Room	
1908		The first time there was a tree in the Roosevelt White House that was not attributed to young Archie Roosevelt.	Edith Roosevelt		
1905		Tree decorated and set up by Archie Roosevelt, as the only member of the family who had "a fondness" for Christmas trees he distributed the presents "through this medium".	Edith Roosevelt		
1903		Tree decorated solely by young Archie Roosevelt.	Edith Roosevelt	Living Room (The President's Den) (then Archie Roosevelt's bedroom)	
1896		Decorated with red, white and blue electric lights. The decorating was supervised by Mrs. Cleveland and included tinsel ornaments and toys.	Frances Cleveland	Library	
1895	Cedar	Tree featured electric lights.	Frances Cleveland	Library	
1894		"Beautifully trimmed and decorated". Decorated with "tiny parti-colored electric lamps instead of the old-time wax candles."	Frances Cleveland	Library	
1893			Frances Cleveland	Library	
1891			Caroline Harrison	Library	
1890		At least one tree was displayed "for the little ones".	Caroline Harrison		
1889	Foxtail hemlock	Glass balls and pendants, gold tinsel. Four-sided-lanterns used candles used for lighting. Credited as the first White House Christmas tree though the claim is disputed (see above).	Caroline Harrison	Yellow Oval Room	
1888		". . . tree laden with gifts, for most of the prominent people about Washington."	Frances Cleveland	East Room	
1853 or 1856		Decorated for a group of Washington, D.C. school children. Credited as the first White House Christmas tree though the claim is disputed (see above).	Jane Pierce		

== See also ==
- National Christmas Tree
- Capitol Christmas Tree
- The Tree at Rockefeller Center
- White House Hanukkah Party
- Vatican Christmas Tree
- List of individual trees
