= Edward M. Kirby =

- Born: June 6, 1906; Brooklyn, New York
- Died: May 11, 1974 (aged 67); Washington, DC
- Burial place: Arlington National Cemetery
- Education: Virginia Military Institute
- Children: 2
- Military career
- Allegiance: United States
- Branch: US Army
- Active service: 1942-45, 1950-53
- Rank: Colonel
- Nickname: Ed
- Conflicts: World War Two, Korean Conflict
- Awards: Personal Peabody Award, Legion of Merit, and honorary membership in the Order of the British Empire
- Other work: Public relations officer to the Greater Washington Board of Trade, People-to-People Foundation, and United Service Organizations (USO)

Colonel Edward M. Kirby (June 6, 1906 – 1974) was an American soldier and public relations officer. After graduating from the Virginia Military Institute he worked as a reporter at the Baltimore Evening Sun and briefly in investment banking. Kirby joined an advertising agency in 1930 and became public relations chief at radio station WSM-AM in 1933. He was appointed director of public relations at the National Association of Broadcasters in 1937 and moved to Washington, DC.

In 1940, Kirby was appointed as a civilian advisor to the US Secretary of War and the following year established the Radio Branch of the War Department's Press Relations Division. In 1942, he was appointed a lieutenant colonel in the US Army and was responsible for creating The Army Hour radio show. He was attached to General Dwight D. Eisenhower's staff at the Supreme Headquarters Allied Expeditionary Force in 1944, and was responsible for coordinating all radio broadcasts associated with the invasion of Normandy.

He worked on several military radio programmes for which he was awarded a 1944 Personal Peabody Award, an honor for excellence in radio broadcasting. After his promotion to full colonel in 1945, he received the Legion of Merit and honorary appointment as an Officer of the Order of the British Empire.

After the war, Kirby became a public relations consultant and co-authored Star-Spangled Radio, an account of the use of radio in World War II. He was recalled to active service during the Korean War, heading the Army’s Radio-TV Branch and creating The Big Picture television documentary series. He left the Army in 1953 and in later life worked as a public relations advisor to the Greater Washington Board of Trade, the People-to-People Foundation, and the United Service Organizations.

== Early life and career ==
Kirby was born in Brooklyn, New York, on June 6, 1906, but lived most of his younger life in Harpers Ferry, West Virginia. He attended the Virginia Military Institute, graduating in 1926. That same year, Kirby found employment as a reporter and feature writer at the Baltimore Evening Sun. He left the Sun in 1928 to become a statistician and newsletter writer in the investment banking industry. He left the investment banking industry in 1929, the same year as the Wall Street crash. In 1930 Kirby became vice president and account executive of the C. P. Clark advertising agency in Nashville, Tennessee. He was also an advertising manager for the National Life and Accident Insurance Company, also based in Nashville. In 1933 Kirby became public relations chief for Nashville radio station WSM-AM. Kirby was appointed director of public relations at the National Association of Broadcasters in 1937 and moved to Washington, DC the following year as part of this role.

== World War II ==
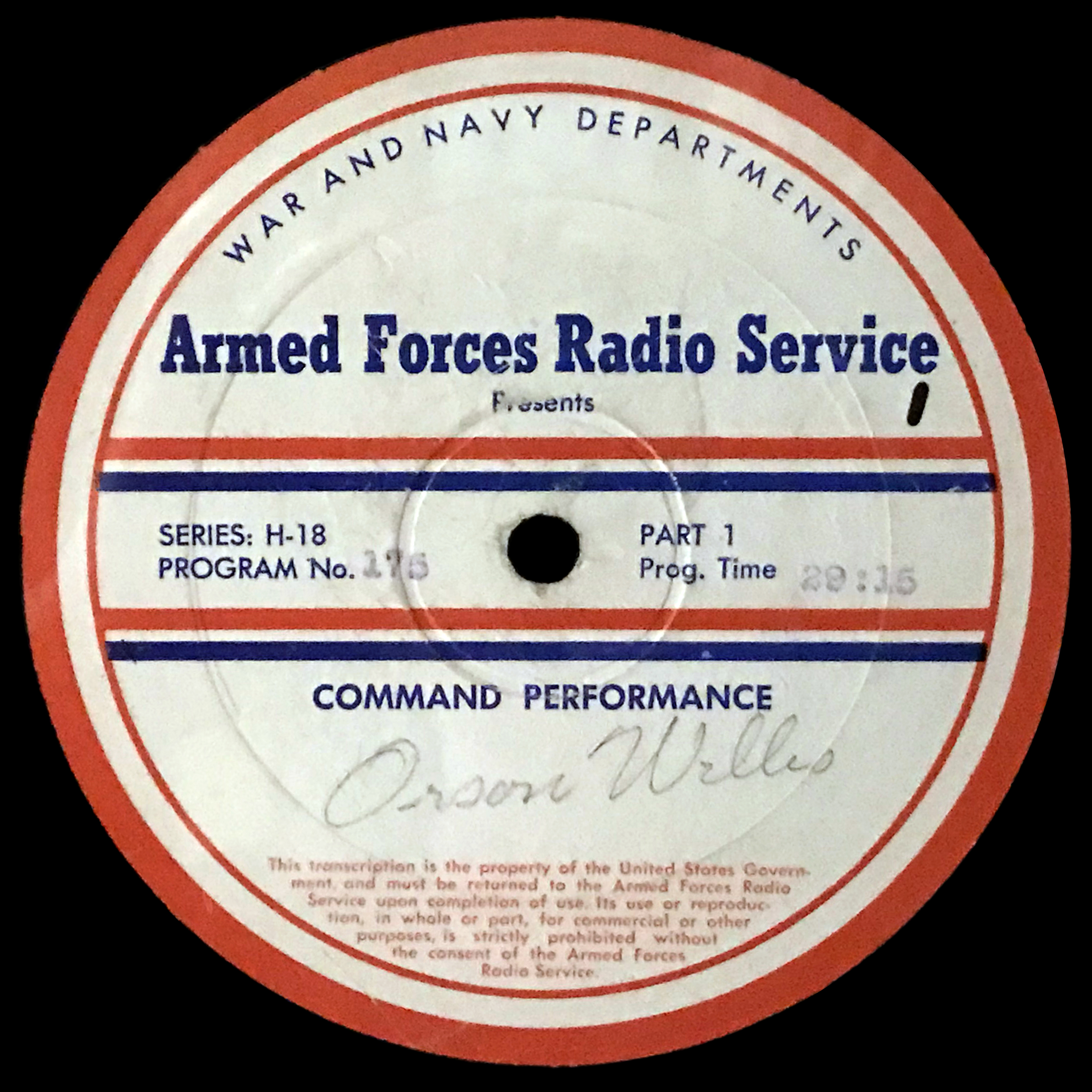
A disc of a 1945 Command Performance broadcast

In 1940 Kirby was appointed as a civilian advisor on radio to the Secretary of War. The following year, he established the Radio Branch of the War Department's Press Relations Division, and in this role he acted as the de facto liaison between the department and the American radio industry. He was appointed a lieutenant colonel in the U.S. Army in May 1942 and chief of the department's Radio Public Relations Branch. There he established The Army Hour radio show and was producer of Command Performance.

Kirby was appointed the radio liaison officer at the Supreme Headquarters Allied Expeditionary Force in 1944, attached to General Dwight D. Eisenhower's staff. He coordinated all of the radio broadcasts associated with the invasion of Normandy. He also established the Allied Radio Network, which provided news and entertainment broadcasts to Allied troops across Europe. Kirby was awarded a 1944 Personal Peabody Award for his work on Command Performance, GI Jive, and Hymns From Home He was promoted to colonel in 1945, the same year he received the Legion of Merit and honorary appointment as an Officer of the Order of the British Empire.

== Later life ==
Excerpt of "Chinese Reds Enter the War", a Korean war episode of The Big Picture, depicting cold weather uniforms

Kirby left the Army at the end of the war in 1945, returning to commercial public relations consultancy. He co-authored Star-Spangled Radio, an account of the use of the media during the war with Jack W. Harris, in 1948.

With the outbreak of the Korean War in 1950, Kirby was recalled to active duty as chief of the U.S. Army's Radio-TV Branch. He was responsible for creating The Big Picture, a television documentary series that broadcast footage filmed by the Army and widely syndicated in the U.S. Kirby persuaded Universal Pictures to produce a film based on the life of American band leader and Air Force officer Glenn Miller, and served as a technical advisor on the film, entitled The Glenn Miller Story and released in 1954.

Again, Kirby left the Army in March 1953, toward the end of the war. Afterwards, he worked as a public relations counsel to the Greater Washington Board of Trade, in which role he successfully proposed that a Pageant of Peace that would incorporate the lighting of the National Christmas Tree but expand it much further into a weeks-long Christmas-themed program.

From 1953 to 1957 he also worked in public relations for the People-to-People Foundation and from 1957 to 1970 served as director of public relations for the United Service Organizations.

Kirby died in Washington, DC in 1974. The Library of American Broadcasting's Broadcast Pioneers Library, housed in the University of Maryland's Hornbake Library, holds a collection of papers relating to Kirby, spanning the period 1923 to 1983 but mainly consisting of material from between 1938 and 1959.
