= National Christmas Tree (United States) =

Large Christmas tree near the White House in Washington, D.C.

Coordinates: 38°53′41.5″N 77°2′10.7″W

Lighting of the National Christmas Tree and the Pageant of Peace
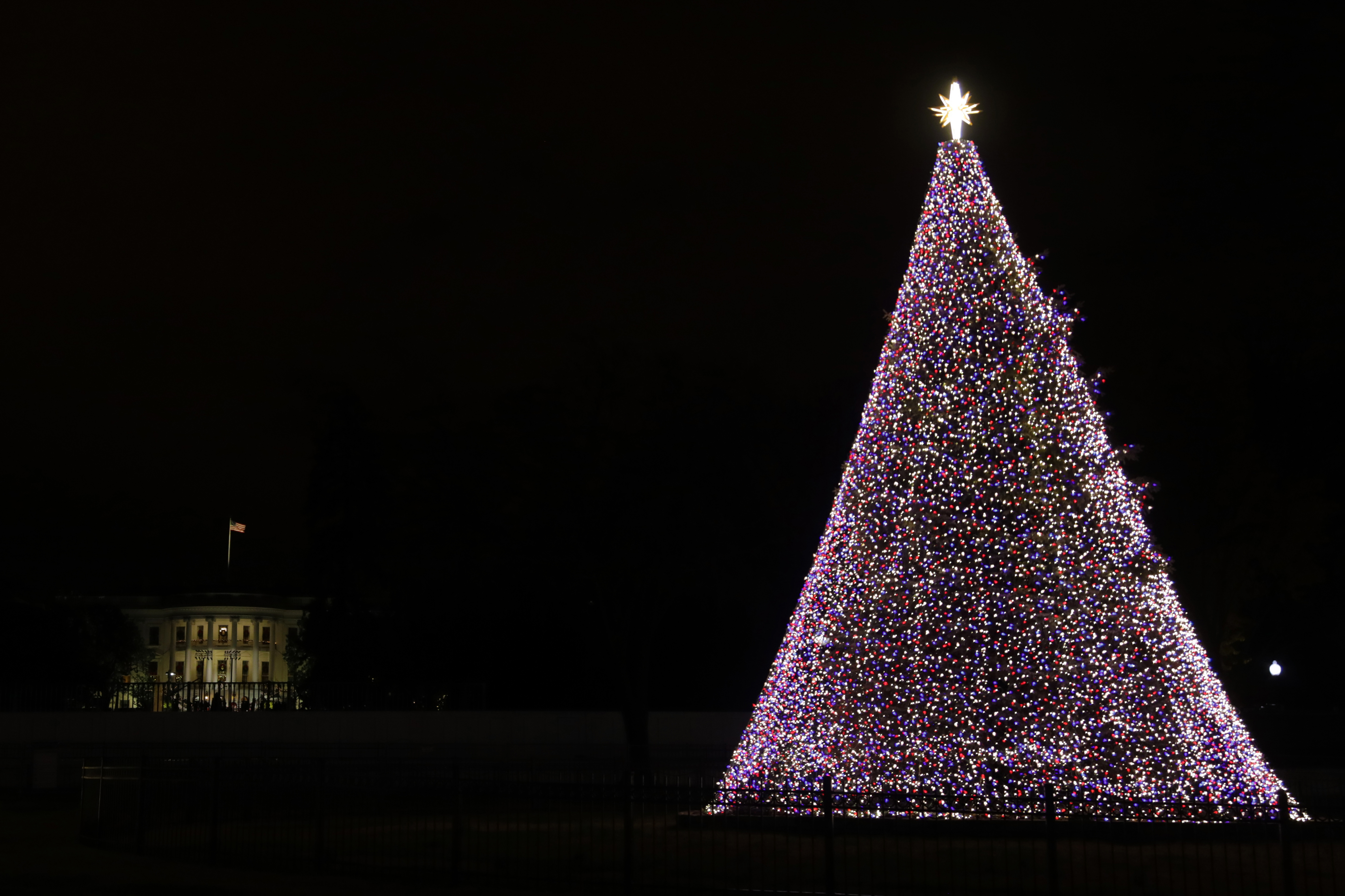
- The 2020 National Christmas Tree
- Begins: December 1
- Ends: January 1
- Frequency: Annual
- Locations: The Ellipse, Washington, D.C., U.S.
- Years active: 1923–1941; 1945–present
- Attendance: 17,000 (2011 approximate)
- Organizer: National Park Foundation and Pageant of Peace, Inc.
- Website: thenationaltree.org

The National Christmas Tree is a large evergreen tree located in the northeast quadrant of the Ellipse near the White House in Washington, D.C. Each year since 1923, the tree has been decorated as a Christmas tree. Every year, early in December, the tree is traditionally lit by the president and first lady of the United States. Every president since Franklin D. Roosevelt has also made formal remarks during the tree lighting ceremony.

Since 1954, this event has marked the start of month-long festivities known as the Pageant of Peace. The line of smaller trees representing the U.S. states, the five U.S. territories, and the District of Columbia around the National Christmas Tree is referred to as the Pathway to Peace.

== Beginnings of the tradition ==
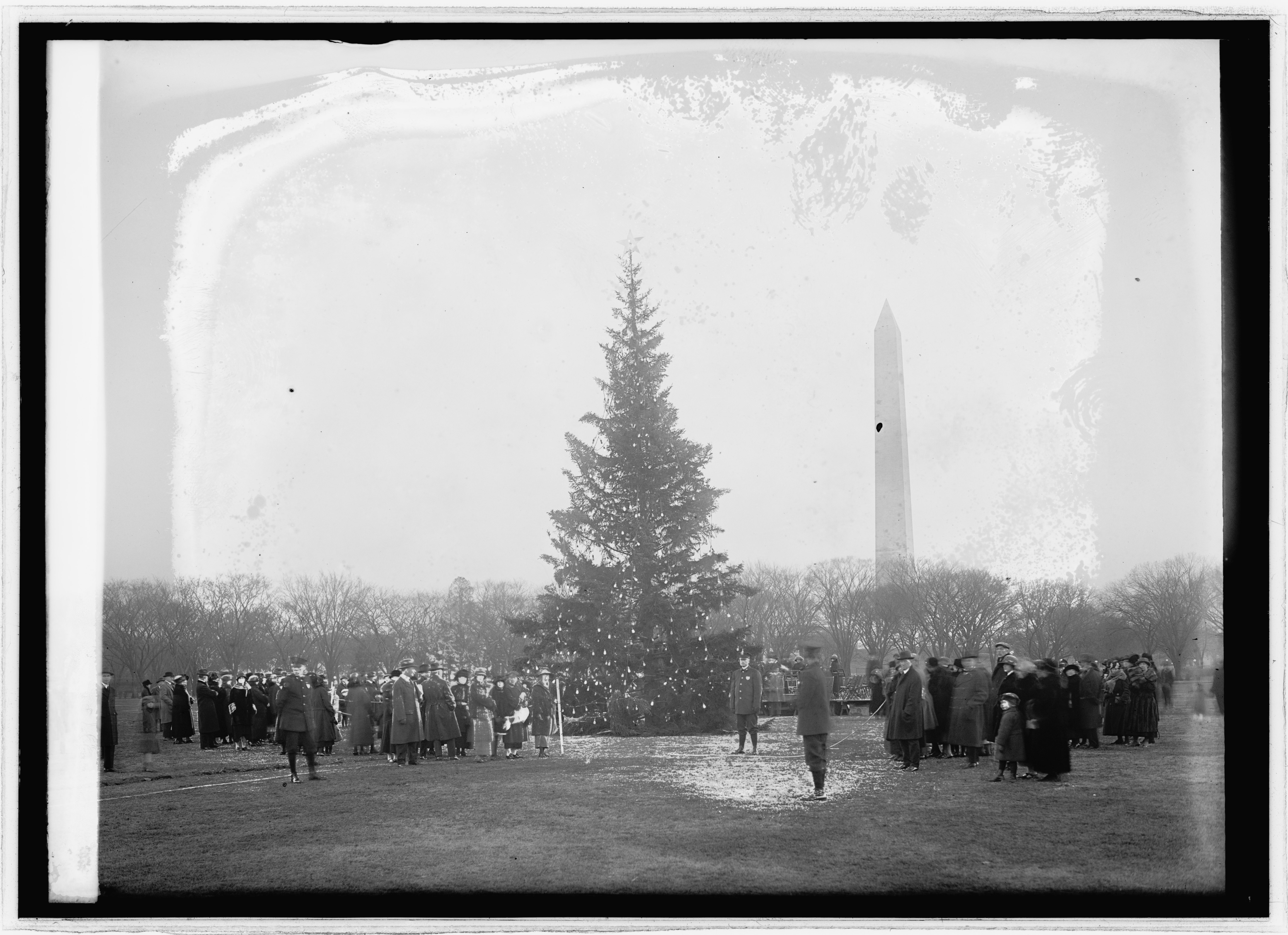
The first Community Christmas Tree, lit on December 24, 1923, in the middle of the Ellipse outside the White House

=== 1923 tree ===
The idea of a decorated, outdoor national Christmas tree originated with Frederick Morris Feiker. Feiker was a highly educated engineer who had been a technical journalist for General Electric from 1906 to 1907 and editor of Electrical World and Electrical Merchandising from 1915 to 1921.

In 1921, Feiker joined the personal staff of United States secretary of commerce Herbert Hoover as a press aide. The Society for Electrical Development, an electrical industry trade group, was looking for a way to encourage people to purchase more electric Christmas lights and thus use electricity, and Feiker suggested that President Calvin Coolidge personally light a tree as a way of giving Christmas lights prominence and social cachet. Vermont Republican senator Frank L. Greene accompanied Feiker to the White House, where they successfully convinced Coolidge to light the tree.

Feiker arranged for Paul Moody, president of Middlebury College in Vermont, to donate a 48-foot (15 m) tall balsam fir as the first National Christmas Tree. Middlebury College alumni paid to have it shipped via express to Washington. The branches on the lower 10 feet (3.0 m) of the tree were damaged in transit, so cut branches from a local evergreen were tied to the tree to restore its appearance.

Feiker put together a group of local civic organizations to erect the tree in the center of the Ellipse and decorate it, and the U.S. electrical industry donated $5,000 worth of electrical cables (which were buried under the Ellipse and provided the tree with electricity). The site for the tree was personally approved by Grace Coolidge. Arrangements were also made to have 3,000 city school children present to sing Christmas carols and the United States Marine Band to play music. The National Broadcasting Company (NBC) agreed to broadcast the event on radio. The tree was decorated with more than 2,500 electric bulbs in red, white, and green donated by the Electric League of Washington.

At 3 p.m. on December 24, 1923, a 100-voice choir from the First Congregational Church assembled on the South Portico of the White House and began a two-hour concert of Christmas carols. At 5 p.m. (dusk) on Christmas Eve, President Coolidge touched a button at the foot of the tree which lit the lights and electric candles adorning the tree, but he did not speak. A searchlight from the nearby Washington Monument was trained on the tree to help illuminate it as well. The Coolidge family invited citizens of the city to sing Christmas carols on the Ellipse after dark. Between 5,000 and 6,000 people thronged the park, joined by 3,000 more people by 9 p.m. The crowds were joined by the Epiphany Church and First Congregational Church choirs, which sang carols, and the Marine Band, which played Christmas-themed music. The singing ended shortly before midnight. After the white residents of the city had dispersed, African American residents of the city were permitted on the park grounds to see the National Christmas Tree. An outdoor Christian worship service was held, and a mass choir composed of signing groups from area community centers sang more Christmas carols. An illuminated Christian cross was flashed on the Washington Monument, to which men dressed as shepherds walked from the National Christmas Tree.

=== 1924 tree ===
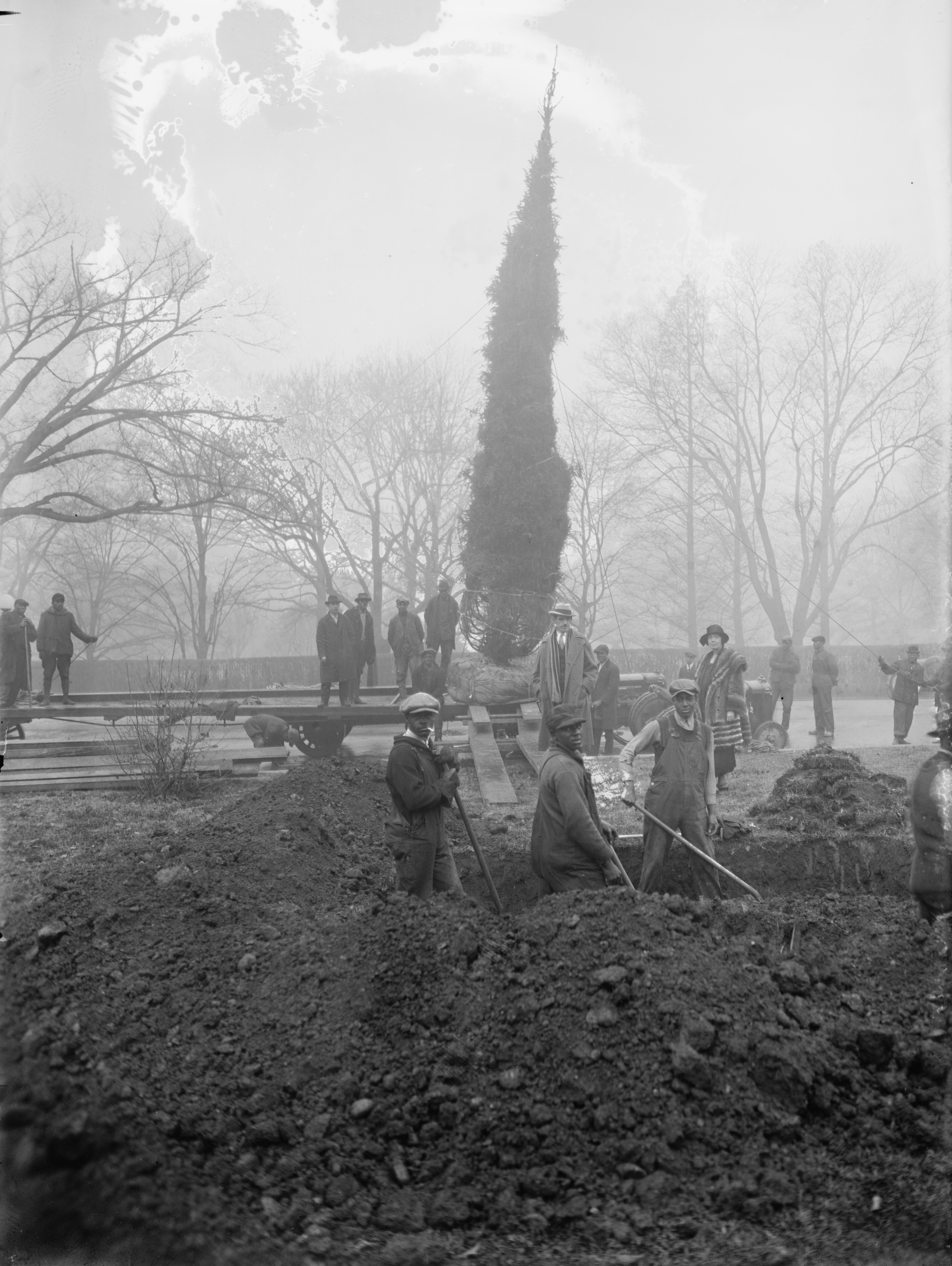
Planting the National Community Christmas Tree (December 17, 1924)

The 1924 ceremony changed significantly. In April 1924, Coolidge gave a speech to the American Forestry Association in which he criticized cutting down trees for use as Christmas decorations. Feiker believed this was the end of the Christmas tree lighting ceremony, but his wife suggested that a live tree be used instead. Feiker, accompanied by T. H. Ormesby of the Society for Electrical Development and Republican Representative Hamilton Fish II of New York, extended the invitation to light the tree to Coolidge on December 6, which he again accepted.

Will H. Hays, chairman of the Republican National Committee, was also chairman of Amawalk Nursery, and Hays arranged for a live, 30-year-old, 35-foot (11 m) Norway spruce to be delivered to the capital. The tree arrived in the city on December 13 and was planted on December 17 on the west side of Sherman Plaza — a patio, garden, and public square just south of the Treasury Building and its adjacent Alexander Hamilton Place. The tree was planted by the American Forestry Association and decorated with 1,000 red, white, and green lights and white electric candles again provided by the Electric League of Washington. The organization donated the strings of lights to the federal government. Power was provided by the Potomac Electric Power Company via an open manhole on the plaza. The tree was now called the National Community Christmas Tree. The Community Center Department of the District of Columbia Public Schools coordinated the choirs for the event and the United States Army Band provided music.

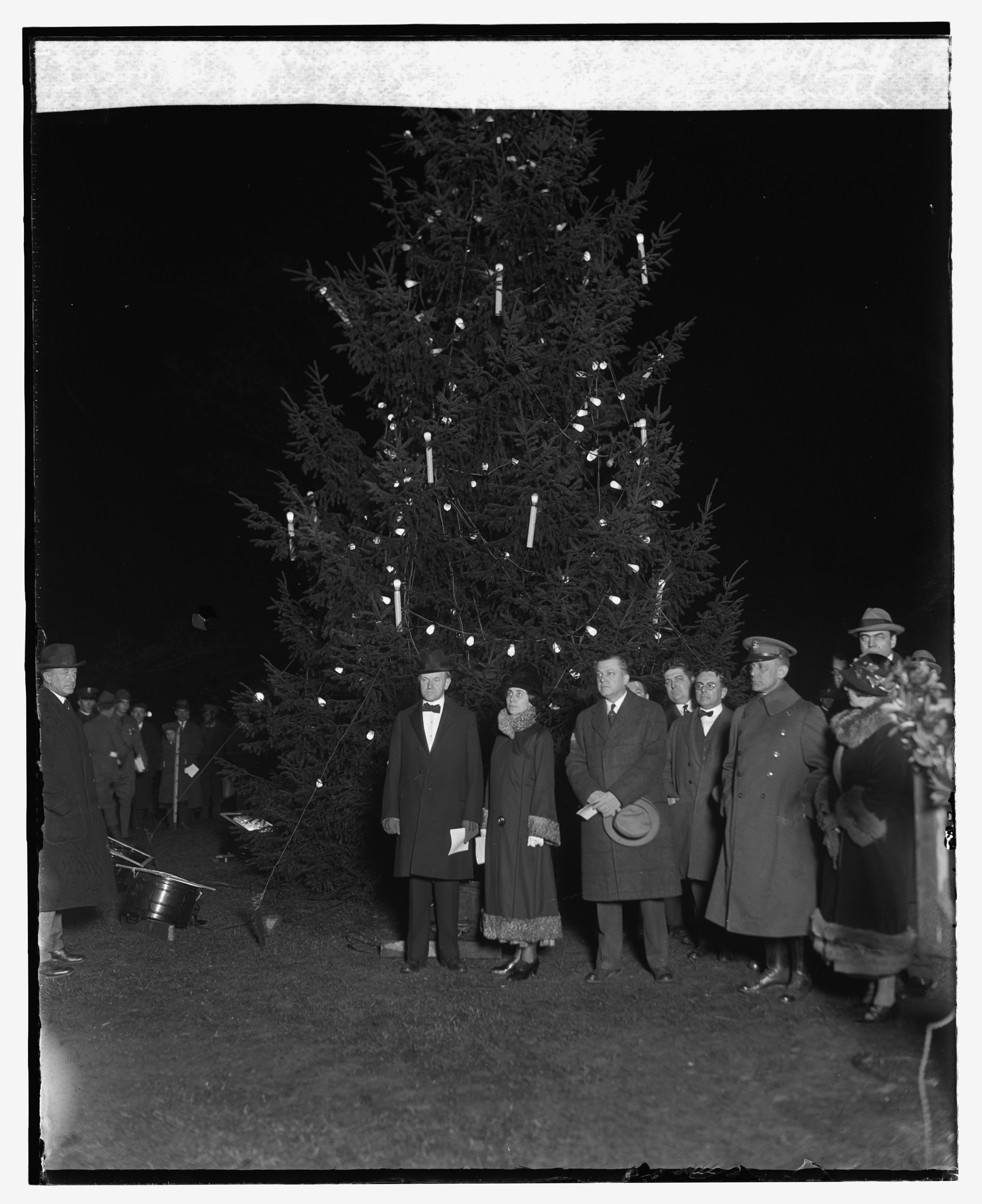
President Coolidge lights the 1924 tree.

Coolidge threw a switch at 8 p.m. to light the tree. It was the only year a switch was used; before and since, a button has been pushed. Although the president did not address the people, he and Grace Coolidge stayed to sing Christmas carols with the large crowd of several thousand. Jason Noble Pierce, pastor of the First Congregational Church, wrote a new Christmas carol, "Christmas Bells," which was dedicated to Grace Coolidge (the Coolidges' son, Calvin Jr., had died on July 7 from blood poisoning). The 70-voice First Congregational Church choir sang the carol for the Coolidges, accompanied by buglers and flute provided by the U.S. Army Band.

=== 1927 to 1933 trees ===
Over the next few years, the annual National Community Christmas Tree lighting ceremony changed in only minor ways such as the timing and the use of illumination. The lighting ceremony was pushed back to 6 p.m. in 1925 to better accommodate children's bedtimes. In 1926, a flare was fired into the air as the tree was illuminated, a tradition which occurred for several years. In 1927, a bronze marker was placed at the base of the tree, declaring it the National Community Christmas Tree. The tree was decorated with improved lighting strings (which required only 500 multicolored bulbs) as well as with 2,000 light-scattering jewels. Colored floodlights at the base of the tree also helped provide color. President Coolidge briefly addressed the crowd, beginning a tradition of a brief presidential speech during the ceremony. NBC broadcast a selection of Christmas carols from speakers placed around the tree from 9 p.m. until midnight. In 1928, the time of the lighting ceremony was again moved to 8 p.m. That year, the Christmas lights were replaced completely by colored floodlights.

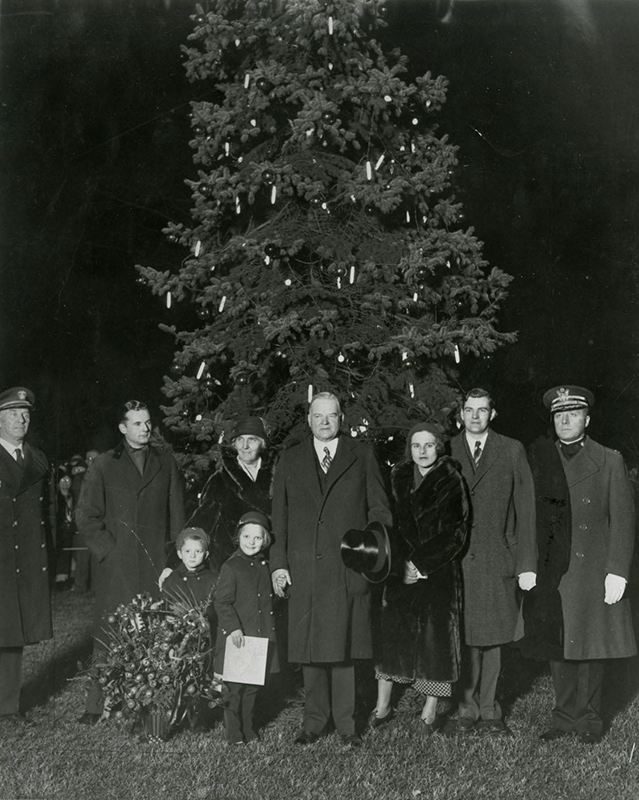
President Herbert Hoover (center) and his family in front of the National Christmas Tree on Christmas Day 1931

An inspection of the National Community Christmas Tree in 1929 found that the tree had been severely damaged by the decoration process and the heat and weight of the lights. Amawalk Nursery again donated a living tree, this one a 35-foot (11 m) tall Norway spruce. It was planted on May 29 of that year. The year was special in other ways, too. It was the first time that Christmas tree decorations (not just lights) were placed on the tree. To prevent the tree from being damaged during the decoration process, scaffolding was erected around the tree instead of placing ladders into the branches; less heavy strings of lights with lower wattage were used; and a low fence was erected around the tree so that its roots would not be trampled. Although much of the program remained unchanged that year, other than the ceremony reverting to its 6 p.m. timing, the 1929 event was notable for another unique reason as well. That evening, as President Herbert Hoover and Lou Henry Hoover were entertaining children from the local community at the White House, a fire broke out in the West Wing. While Lou Henry Hoover quietly moved the children into the East Wing and safety, the president and other men rushed into the West Wing and retrieved furniture, historic items, files and important papers, Hoover's personal effects, and a puppy that was to be given as a gift to one of the children. The West Wing, including the Oval Office, was gutted and had to be rebuilt.

Two years later in 1931, the National Community Christmas Tree was again found to be so severely damaged that it was replaced a second time. The National Park Service history of the tree concludes that although there is no documentation that the tree was removed, photographic evidence clearly shows the 35-foot (11 m) tall Norway spruce had been replaced by a 25-foot (7.6 m) tall blue spruce. The National Park Service believes this tree was obtained from the Office of Public Buildings and Public Parks of the National Capitol, an independent federal agency, in the spring of 1931. During the ceremony that year, the button President Hoover pressed at 5 p.m. was not actually connected to the electricity^{[1]} but set off a buzzer to alert another official to actually light the tree.^{[2]} The button to be pushed by the president would not be reconnected to actual electricity again until 1980.^{[2]}

Other changes occurred in the 1932 tree ceremony. It was the first year that someone other than the president lit the tree. Because President Hoover and his family were vacationing away from Washington, Vice President Charles Curtis lit the tree at 5 p.m. on December 24. It was also the first year of the use of recorded music, with loudspeakers concealed in the branches of the tree and connected to a phonograph in a nearby police booth to play Christmas carols every night from 6 to 10 p.m. until New Year's Day. The "Singing Tree" was a hit with the public, and although music and choirs continued to perform each year thereafter, the tradition of the Singing Tree lasted for several more decades.

In 1933, the National Community Christmas Tree stood alone on Sherman Plaza. All plants but the National Christmas Tree had been removed from the area in the fall and the ground regraded as part of a widening of E Street NW. During early 1934, the tree was cut down and replaced with double row of willow oaks.

== Great Depression and World War II ==
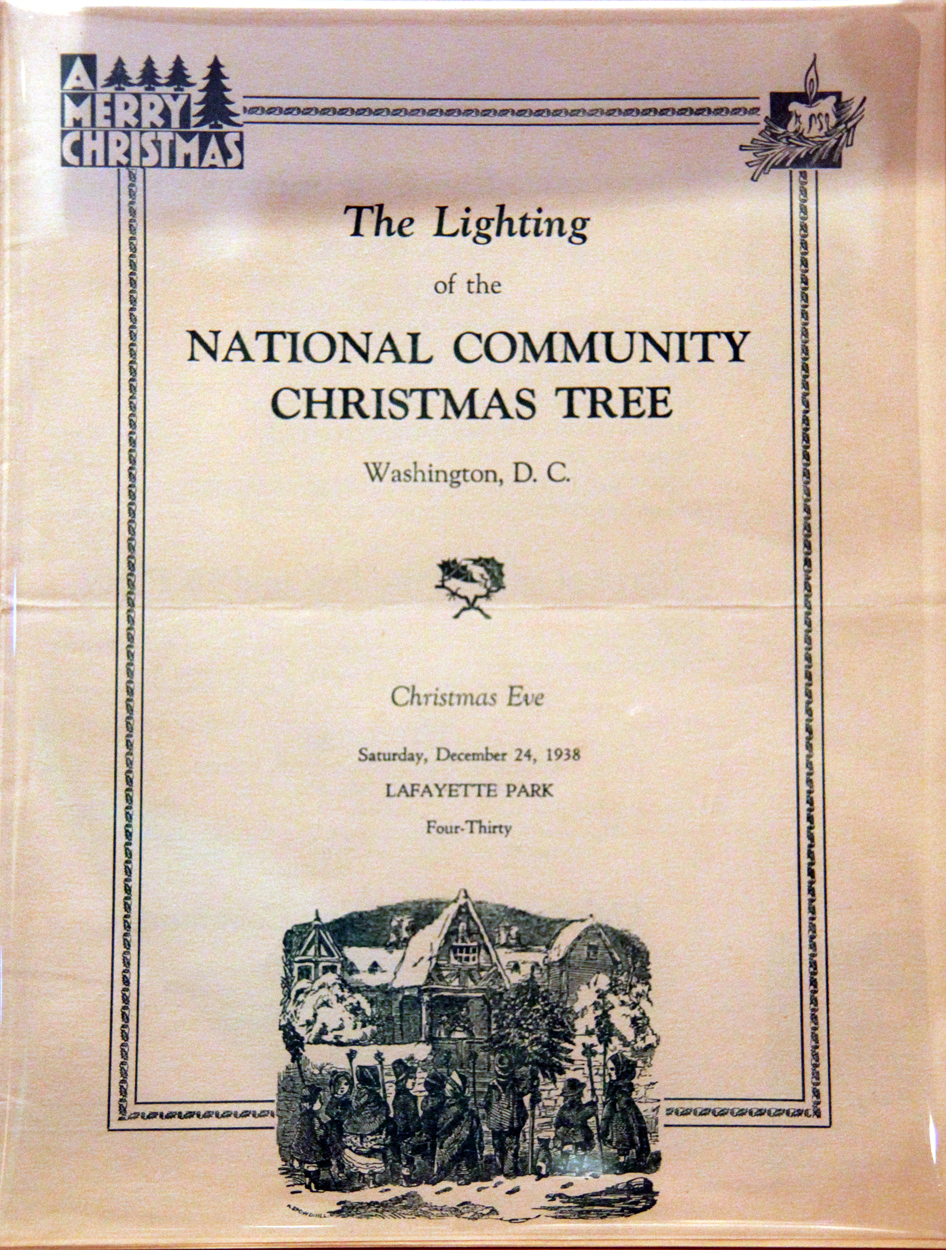
Program for the 1938 tree lighting ceremony, which marked the last time the National Christmas Tree ceremony was held in Lafayette Park.

In 1934, the National Christmas Tree was relocated to Lafayette Park north of the White House. The 1931 Norway spruce had again become damaged, and the National Park Service purchased two "Koster" blue spruce cultivars to plant on the west side of Sherman Plaza with the intent of alternating use each year between trees. But when it became clear later that year that the National Christmas Tree would have to be moved from Sherman Plaza, the agency asked the Commission of Fine Arts (which had partial jurisdiction over planting decisions around the White House) for permission to plant the two trees to the southeast and southwest of the statue of Andrew Jackson in Lafayette Square. The Commission opposed the plan, and suggested that two fir trees be planted east and west of the statue instead. For a time, the National Park Service hoped to plant two trees of an undetermined species on the Ellipse near the White House, but in the end acceded to the Commission's plan. Two 23-foot (7.0 m) high Fraser firs from North Carolina were planted to the 18 to 23 feet (5.5 to 7.0 m) east and west of the Jackson statue. The trees were planted just a few weeks before the tree lighting ceremony, and the western tree was chosen to begin the alternating use of the trees since it was more visible from the first family's living quarters. During the tree lighting ceremony, President Roosevelt drew attention to the statue of Andrew Jackson and asked the American people to be as courageous in the face of the depression as Jackson had been throughout his lifetime. The tree did not light when Roosevelt threw the switch, remaining unlit for about five seconds while Roosevelt worriedly looked about, but then the lights came on.

In 1935, the 24-foot (7.3 m) high eastern tree was used. During the tree lighting ceremony, President Roosevelt extemporaneously poked fun at the previous year's lighting glitch before exhorting all Americans to come together in courage and unity as did the famous American war heroes honored with statues in the park: Comte de Rochambeau, the Marquis de Lafayette, General Tadeusz Kos'ciuszko, Major General Friedrich Wilhelm von Steuben, and Andrew Jackson.

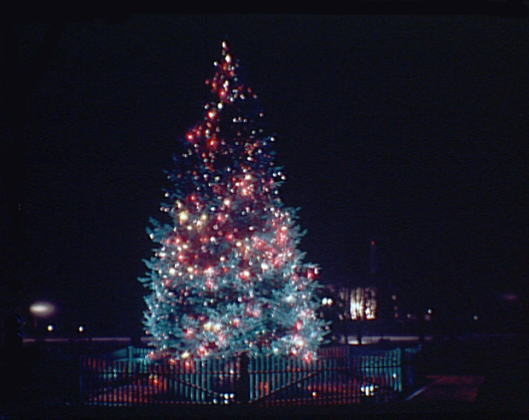
The National Community Christmas Tree in Lafayette Square, circa 1936 to 1938.

New star-shaped Christmas tree lights were used in 1935, but some were stolen the week after Christmas. To discourage future thefts, a temporary low octagonal fence was constructed around the 1936 tree. The method of lighting the tree also changed. The National Park Service history of the tree claims that in 1936 or 1937, the button used since 1925 was replaced by a switchbox. The Washington Post, however, indicates that the button was still used in 1936. The box was definitely in use by 1937. It was constructed and donated by the Electric Institute of Washington, and engraved with the name of every person who had lit the tree since 1923. In 1938, the Electric Institute donated mercury-vapor floodlights to the federal government to help illuminate the tree.

In 1939, the National Community Christmas Tree was moved back to the Ellipse. The reasons for this move are varied. The National Park Police said it was because the Ellipse was more spacious. A 36-foot (11 m) high red cedar was dug up from along the Mount Vernon Memorial Parkway in Virginia and planted just a few days before Christmas at a site just south of the center of the Ellipse, though it would be replanted at its old site the following year. It was the second-highest national Christmas tree in the history of the event, and it required 700 hand-colored light bulbs, 100 hand-crafted glass stars and several mercury-vapor floodlights to decorate and illuminate. More than 8,000 people attended the 1939 ceremony. The tradition of the "Singing Tree" was discontinued in this year, however.

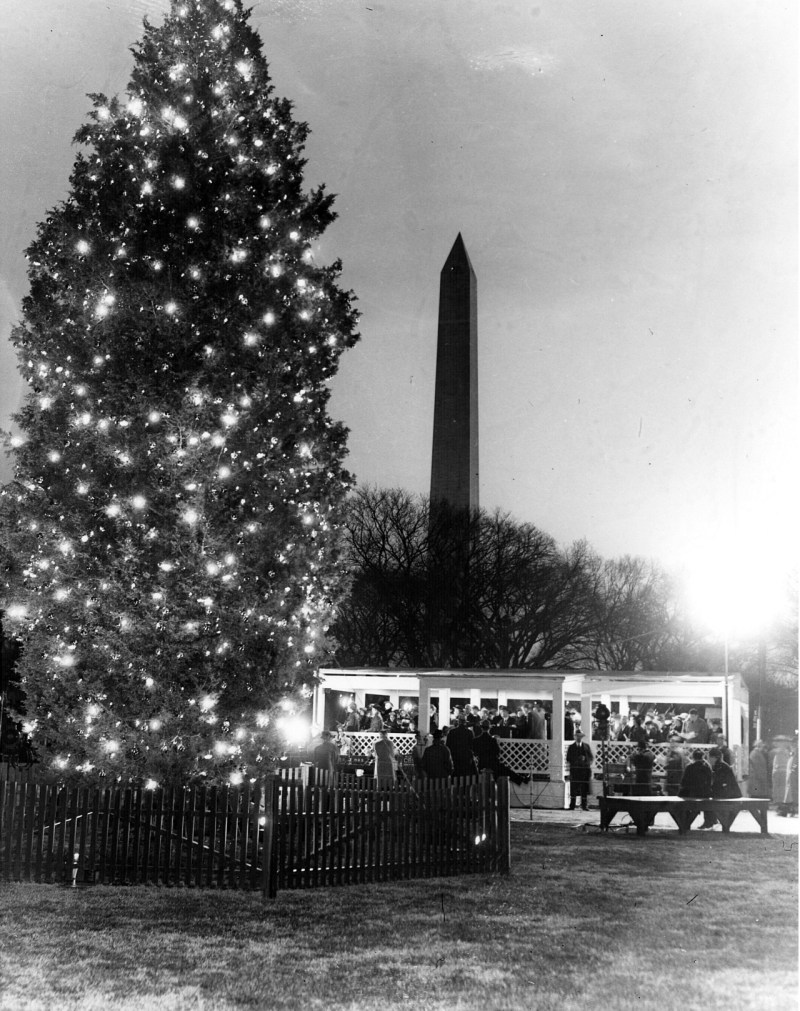
The 1940 National Community Christmas Tree

The tradition of using a briefly-transplanted tree occurred again in 1940. The 1940 tree was a 34-foot (10 m) high red cedar. More than 700 hand-colored lights, 700 ornaments, and six blue-green mercury-vapor lights were used to light and decorate it. Once more, the tree was taken from along the Mount Vernon Memorial Parkway and replanted after January 1.

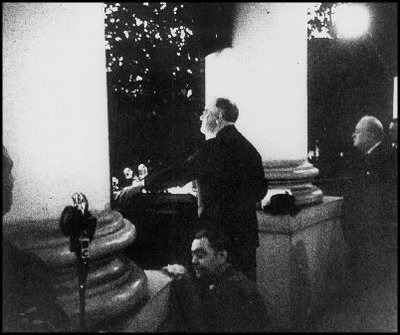
President Franklin D. Roosevelt speaks before lighting the 1941 National Christmas Tree. British prime minister Winston Churchill (right) was a surprise guest.

In 1941, however, the National Christmas Tree was relocated to just inside the south fence on the South Lawn of the White House. President Roosevelt personally made the request after having discussed the issue with Eleanor Roosevelt on December 24, 1940, so that the ceremony could be a more "homey" experience. Two live, 35-foot (11 m) high Oriental spruce trees were taken from the White House grounds itself and planted 100 feet (30 m) north of the south fence of the White House, each about 25 feet, 7.6 m off the north–south axis with the Jefferson Memorial. As with the trees in Lafayette Park, they were to be used in alternate years. After the attack on Pearl Harbor on December 7, there was concern that the tree would not be lit due to security concerns. But the ceremony and musical program went ahead as planned, with the east tree serving as the year's National Community Christmas Tree. On December 22, British Prime Minister Winston Churchill secretly arrived in the United States aboard the HMS Duke of York and flew the remaining 150 miles (240 km) to Washington, where he stayed with President Roosevelt in the White House for the Arcadia Conference. At 4 p.m. on December 24, the southeast and southwest gates of the South Lawn were opened and between 20,000 and 40,000 people entered the grounds, searched and watched over by U.S. Army soldiers, D.C. Metropolitan Police, and agents of the Federal Bureau of Investigation. Another 2,000 to 3,000 people waited outside the fence. On the portico of the White House with Roosevelt and Churchill stood Crown Prince Olav and Crown Princess Märtha of Norway, which had been occupied by Nazi Germany on April 9, 1940, and their three children; Roosevelt confidant Harry Hopkins; Attorney General Francis Biddle; Associate Justice of the Supreme Court Stanley Forman Reed; and Associate Justice Robert H. Jackson. Although warned that it was a security risk, Roosevelt and Churchill remained on the portico for the entire hour-long program. The crowd was kept at least 330 feet (100 m) from the White House porch.

For the first time in its history, the National Community Christmas Tree was not lit in 1942 due to the need to conserve power and observe security restrictions on outdoor lighting and for security reasons not lit again until after the war concluded in 1945. Nonetheless, President Roosevelt continued to give a national radio address on what would have been the date of the tree lighting ceremony during these three years. Ornaments for the 1942 tree were donated by local D.C. schoolchildren, limited to the colors red, white, and blue. With the president and his family spending Christmas of 1943 at their family home of Springwood in Hyde Park, New York, and with concern that the tree ceremony might worsen the transportation overcrowding situation in the city, a decision was made to cancel the National Community Christmas Tree decoration altogether, but Eleanor Roosevelt requested that the ceremony proceed, and so it did. Once more, local children contributed the tree's ornaments, which were again permitted to be multicolored. Each ornament had a small white tag attached to it, commemorating an American soldier, sailor, or flier who had been wounded, killed, or gone missing in combat. President Roosevelt was in Hyde Park again in 1944, although Eleanor Roosevelt remained at the White House for the annual tree ceremony; and once more local schoolchildren contributed the ornaments.

== Post-War National Christmas Trees and the Pageant of Peace ==
The lighting ceremony was first televised in 1946, although it reached few homes because the broadcast was limited and television was in its infancy. The two Oriental spruce trees were again found to be damaged by the decorations. Federal officials raised the suggestion that the trees be replaced with artificial trees, but this was actively opposed by the live Christmas tree industry and the idea was dropped. Television coverage expanded for the 1947 ceremony, with both NBC and the DuMont Television Network televising the event. Television coverage continued to expand in the following years. In 1948, the tree included many more white bulbs in addition to the traditional red and green ones so that the tree would look better on TV. It was also topped by a star-shaped tree-topper consisting of eight flashing bulbs. That year, for the first time since 1938, the "Singing Tree" returned.

From 1948 to 1951, President Truman spent Christmas at his home in Independence, Missouri, and lit the National Community Christmas Tree by remote control. Declining public attendance after four years of the president's absence led organizers in January 1952 to plead for Truman's presence at the next ceremony. Truman agreed to stay at the White House for Christmas 1952 and personally lit the tree. Even though the Korean War was raging during Christmas in 1950, 1951, and 1952, crowds were still permitted on the White House grounds. The lone exception was in 1950, when crowds were kept outside the fences due to renovations going on at the White House.

=== Development of the Pageant of Peace and Pathway of Peace ===
The annual lighting ceremony for the National Community Christmas Tree expanded at a fast pace in the 1950s. In 1953, The New York Times reported that millions of Americans were watching the ceremony on television. There were also pressures to expand the event. For roughly 15 years, the ceremony had remained largely the same: a local choir would sing some carols; a military service band would play a selection of Christmas music for a half-hour before the president emerged to speak briefly and light the tree; a member of the Boy Scouts of America and either the Girl Scouts of the USA or the Camp Fire Girls would greet the president on behalf of the people of the city of Washington; after the president returned to the White House, the band would play more music for a half-hour; and then the public would be cleared from the area.

In 1952, however, a group of Catholic Church sodalities asked that a nativity scene be included in the ceremony, repeating the request in 1953. There was also pressure to move the ceremony off the White House South Lawn. In 1953, due to security concerns, only 700 members of the public were allowed onto the White House grounds while another 3,500 watched from outside the fence.

The beginning of an actual pageant was the brainchild of Edward M. Kirby, public relations counsel for the National Capitol Committee of the Washington Board of Trade. The idea came to him after flying into the District of Columbia in early December 1953 and feeling disappointment at looking out the windows of the plane to see that the city had none of the visual impact of other major metropolises at Christmastime. A few weeks later, December 29, Kirby submitted a memo to the Board of Trade proposing a Christmas-themed "Pageant of Peace" to expand the tree lighting ceremony into a program filled with light, music, and art with international focus on the theme of PEACE but not emphasizing any particular religion. The peace theme was intended to echo the words of the angels ("Glory to God in the highest, and on earth peace, good will toward men") announcing the birth of Jesus to shepherds as described in the New Testament. The concept evolved into a three-week-long series of nightly performances and religious observances.

The Board of Trade was attracted to the idea of a pageant because of waning public interest in the tree lighting ceremony, although the pageant would require that the Christmas tree be moved off the White House grounds and the tree lighting ceremony shifted from Christmas Eve to earlier in December. President Dwight Eisenhower approved the plan on November 4, 1953, and the first pageant — entitled Christmas Pageant of Peace — was held on the Ellipse December 17, 1954. A cut tree was used because Park Service officials felt that a living tree would interfere with various cultural and recreational events on the Ellipse at other times of the year.

The tree chosen for the first Pageant of Peace was a 67-foot (20 m) tall balsam fir from northern Michigan, decorated with 2,100 red, blue, and gold lights and topped by a brilliant white star. South of the tree — leading toward it in a straight line from E Street NW — was a "Pathway of Peace." On either side of the Pathway stood smaller Christmas trees, decorated with lights and a variety of ornaments, from U.S. states and territories as well as foreign embassies.

Man-made snow covered the grounds. Wooden boardwalks were used to guide visitors on the Pathway as well as elsewhere around the spacious exhibits that took up much of the Ellipse. These included a life-size nativity scene with live animals, an outdoor stage that accommodated singing groups and tableau vivant, and a "Children's Corner" with live reindeer, a puppet stage, and a place for children to donate toys to less fortunate children overseas. Religious ceremonies as well as entertainment both religious and secular occurred nightly through Epiphany.

Preceding the 5:30 pm tree lighting ceremony was a half-hour concert by the United States Marine Band and the 80-voice Justin Lawrie Choir. Also preceding the event — but not part of the planned performances — was the escape by several sheep from the life-size nativity scene. They ran into the nearby rush-hour traffic (one even entered a local drugstore) until rounded up by Metropolitan Motorcycle Police, placing the sheep in their sidecars and shepherding them back safely to their enclosure before the arrival of the presidential party.

President Eisenhower lit the tree in front of 7,500 people. Six Boy Scouts and Cub Scouts from around the world, flown in with funds provided by UNICEF, joined the president on the dais. Movie actor Robert Montgomery, who served as Eisenhower's advisor on the president's television appearances, was also present. The ceremony was carried live nationally by all the major radio and television networks, as well as internationally on Voice of America.

The initial Pageant of Peace was a huge success. More than 6,000 people performed or otherwise participated in the event. Up to 20,000 people a day visited the event. A grand total of between 300,000 and 500,000 people visited the Ellipse over its three weeks to see the exhibits and performances, with bumper-to-bumper traffic on nearby streets as people drove by to view the trees, and the Pageant proved so popular that it was extended for two days.

The total cost of the event was set at $30,000 (about $253,000 in 2011 inflation-adjusted dollars), most of which was provided by payment in kind although the Board of Trade contributed $7,500 in cash. Most of the goods and services that made the first Pageant of Peace possible were donated. Local architect Leon Chatelain Jr., designed the site. Michigan State College provided the tree and the Baltimore and Ohio Railroad and Norfolk Southern Railway the transportation to bring the tree to Washington. Pepco supplied the Christmas lights and power. The Hargrove Display Decorators of Cheverly, Maryland, provided the nativity scene. Twenty-seven U.S. states and territories as well as 23 embassies set up peace symbols, plaques, and small Christmas trees along the Pathway of Peace. The National Park Service provided animal stalls, metal fencing, stage, and wooden walkways. The American Ice Co. provided the man-made snow.

== National Christmas Trees from 1955 to 1972 ==
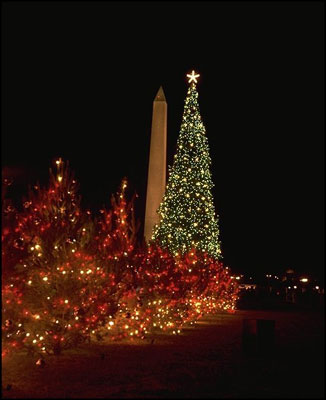
Red lights adorn the state trees surrounding the National Christmas tree in 1965. Smaller live trees representing the 50 states, five territories, and the District of Columbia, formed a "Pathway of Peace."

A formal organization, Pageant of Peace, Inc., was formed in 1955 to take over the event from the loose confederation of business, religious, and civic groups which had organized the 1954 pageant. Spurring the legal incorporation of the group was the projected cost of the 1955 event, which was estimated to be between $35,000 and $50,000. The group was incorporated on September 30, 1955, with the Board of Trade providing the seed money for the new nonprofit organization. President Eisenhower had suffered a serious heart attack on September 24, 1955, and was recuperating at his farm near Gettysburg, Pennsylvania, so the tree was lit remotely once more. 1955 was also the first year that Hargrove Display Decorators began decorating the National Christmas Tree. Ten minutes after the tree was lit, the star and many lights near the top of the tree went out. Earl Hargrove quickly ascended a ladder and discovered why: A string of lights had come unplugged. The problem was immediately rectified. More than 50 embassies took part in the Pathway of Peace that second year. Attendance at the event, though now scaled back from three to two weeks, soared to 540,000.

A record 51 embassies participated in the 1956 Pageant of Peace, which included a 25-foot (7.6 m) high Christmas tree jointly donated by 11 Arab nations. In 1957, the Pageant of Peace culminated in a night of folk dancing at Lisner Auditorium on the campus of George Washington University. Foreign embassies were not invited to participate in the 1958 Pathway to Peace after festival organizers came to believe that they were imposing on the legations. But the embassies were invited to participate again in 1959, and did so. 1959 also saw festival organizers dye the grass green for the first time. When President Eisenhower lit the tree on December 23, a "Singing Christmas Tree" (a choir on an inclined grandstand holding candles, forming the triangular shape of a Christmas tree) formed a backdrop behind him.

President John F. Kennedy did not light the tree in December 1961, because his father, Joseph P. Kennedy Sr., had suffered a major stroke; so Vice President Lyndon B. Johnson lit the tree. An electronic console nearby picked up musical sounds from performers on the stage, and altered the color and brightness of the tree's 3,000 multicolored lights. The tree lighting occurred three days earlier than usual because President Kennedy had been scheduled to leave for Bermuda to meet with British Prime Minister Harold Macmillan. The Washington Post reported that embassies did not provide trees or symbols for the Pathway of Peace, instead participating in a music festival at Lisner Auditorium on December 26. Just 16 U.S. states provide trees for the Pathway of Peace. President Kennedy did light the 1962 tree (on December 17), although the changing lights used in 1961 were not used again. The number of Christmas trees on the Pathway of Peace now numbered 52, including all 50 states, Guam, and Puerto Rico.

Although the 1963 tree lighting ceremony was scheduled for December 18, President Kennedy had been assassinated on November 22 and President Johnson declared an official 30-day period of national mourning, thus delaying the lighting of the National Christmas Tree until December 22. After a one-hour candle-lighting ceremony at the Lincoln Memorial, President Johnson traveled to the Ellipse and lit the tree. That year, the General Electric company began donating the lights for the tree, changing the lighting set every year. Alvin L.Hart was the GE illuminating engineer who designed the National Tree from 1963 until 1972. In addition to the life-size nativity scene, Yule log, stage, and live reindeer, the International Paper Company donated 80 small cut Christmas trees decorated with white lights and erected in the shape of a "Cross of Peace" on the Ellipse. Although green dye had been used since 1959 to make the grass look green, no dye was used in 1963 due to the unusual snow that covered the grounds.

Small changes in the tree lighting scheme and pageant occurred throughout the 1960s. Instead of multicolored lights, in 1964 the tree was lit with 5,000 red bulbs. It was decorated with 500 large gold ornaments, and instead of a star was topped with a white cross. But when British Prime Minister Harold Wilson visited the United States in 1965 and witnessed the tree lighting ceremony, the tree once more featured multicolored (blue, green, and white) lights. The 53 trees on the Pathway of Peace that year were lit with red and white bulbs. This was also the first year that the American Mining Congress, a coalition of coal mining companies, began providing the trees of the Pathway of Peace. In 1966, the 53 Christmas trees of the Pathway of Peace were alternatively lit in all-green or all-blue lights, and were arranged in an arc around the National Christmas Tree rather than lining the path to it. The following year, the National Christmas Tree was lit with blue lights and encircled with strings of red and white lights, and decorated with gold balls. The tree-topper that year was not a star but a 4-foot (1.2 m) tall gold spire with a base of golden stars. The trees on the Pathway to Peace, however, returned to multicolored lights. For the first time in the history of the tree lighting ceremony, a non-American choir (the Festival Singers of Toronto) performed at the opening event. The National Christmas Tree used a blue, white, and yellow lighting scheme in 1968. When President Johnson lit the National Christmas Tree, this caused another Christmas tree to be lit remotely by radio control in the newly electrified village of Nulato, Alaska (one of 59 rural Eskimo villages to receive electricity for the first time that year). In 1969, the number of trees on the Pathway to Peace expanded to 57, to include all American unincorporated territories and the District of Columbia. The National Christmas Tree that year was decorated in bands of red and white lights, and was at the top of a huge capital letter "V" formed by the Pathway's 12-foot (3.7 m) tall Red Pine trees from eastern Ohio. The 1969 ceremony was interrupted by about 200 individuals protesting the Vietnam War, who repeatedly heckled the president during his short speech and who temporarily planted an 8-foot (2.4 m) tall "peace tree" a few yards from the National Christmas Tree. Eight adults and a youth were arrested during the event for disorderly conduct.

The 1970 National Christmas Tree suffered several near-disasters. The 78-foot (24 m) tall blue spruce from South Dakota's Black Hills was carried to Washington, D.C., on a train. The train derailed twice on its way to the city. The weekend before the tree lighting ceremony, the tree blew over in high winds and several cut branches had to be attached to the tree to replace damaged ones. A few days after the tree was lit, lightbulbs on the lower half of the tree began exploding after a fireproofing liquid applied to the sockets began causing shorts in the strings of lights. No anti-war protests occurred during the tree lighting ceremony in 1970, however. Women Strike for Peace temporarily won a court order permitting them to set up an anti-Vietnam War display of 11 lighted styrofoam tombstones listing the number of American war dead near the pageant, but this ruling was overturned by the United States Court of Appeals for the District of Columbia Circuit two days later on December 18. (The anti-war display was set up on the Washington Monument grounds instead.) The 1970 tree was lit by President Richard Nixon and Andre Proctor, a local District of Columbia child whom President Nixon picked out of the crowd at the last moment to assist him with the tree-lighting. The 1970 Pageant of Peace also included a tree dedicated to prisoners of war and soldiers missing in action.

Vice President Spiro Agnew lit the 1971 National Christmas Tree. Protesters briefly interrupted the beginning of Agnew's speech, chanting for peace, before Agnew and seven-year-old Gary Morris (a child in the institutional care of the city) lit the tree. On December 15, Women Strike for Peace was granted permission by Judge Joseph Cornelius Waddy of the United States District Court for the District of Columbia to place an anti-war display next to the National Christmas Tree, but they did not have time to erect a display before the lighting ceremony. The tree-topper that year resembled a white snowflake, while the tree itself was decorated with red and white bulbs in clusters amid a wider blanket of gold lights. There were 56 trees in Pageant of Peace, plus an extra tree for POW/MIAs. Vice President Agnew again lit the tree in 1972. Assisting the Vice President was Eric Watt, 10-year-old son of future secretary of the interior James G. Watt. More than 9,000 green bulbs, 1,000 clear bulbs, and 250 5-inch (13 cm) globe bulbs were used to decorate the tree. The U.S. Army supplied floodlights which also helped to illuminate the tree, which was kept lit 24 hours a day. There were 57 trees representing the 50 U.S. states and territories at the Pageant of Peace, with another 75 evergreen trees for decoration. The trees were again placed in the shape of a giant "V" rather than two parallel rows. The American Mining Congress declined to supply the smaller trees in 1972, so the state of Pennsylvania agreed to do so. Former president Harry S. Truman died on December 26, 1972. All performances at the Pageant of Peace were cancelled on December 28 (the national day of mourning for Truman), although the tree remained lit for security reasons. Although there were no protests at the tree lighting ceremony, anti-war protests were held at the Pageant of Peace on December 25 and December 30.

== National Christmas Tree: Living trees since 1973 ==
=== The first living trees: 1973 to 1977 ===
Having used cut trees from around the country since 1954, the Christmas Pageant of Peace reintroduced a living tree in 1973. A spontaneous, grass-roots letter writing campaign by American citizens began pressing in 1965 for a live tree. The letter-writing campaign intensified in 1969. Prodded by environmentalists, a much larger letter-writing campaign ("more letters and phone calls of protest than in the previous 10 years" a Park Service spokesperson said) occurred in the two months prior to the 1972 tree lighting ceremony, which prompted the National Park Service to bow to public pressure and plant a live tree.

A 42-foot Colorado blue spruce from the Sunset Lake Nursery near Shickshinny, Pennsylvania, was donated by the National Arborist Association and planted in the Ellipse close to the Zero Milestone just east of the central north–south axis of the White House. The tree arrived in the city via flatbed truck and was planted on October 11, 1973. Because the tree had been badly damaged when it fell off the flatbed truck, the tree's life span was significantly affected. North of the tree, a bronze plaque was installed that read "National Christmas Tree, Transplanted October 11, 1973, Christmas Pageant of Peace Committee." Initially, the General Electric company, which had been donating the lighting for the tree for years, developed a "cool lighting" system to help protect the tree from the heat damage caused by standard Christmas tree lights. But this scheme was subsequently abandoned due to the need to conserve energy because of the 1973 oil crisis. Instead, eight colored floodlights at the base of the tree were used to illuminate the National Christmas Tree's decorations and its 36-inch (91 cm) high gold snowflake tree-topper (although the snowflake itself was lit from within). The spotlights did not illuminate the tree directly for fear of causing heat damage; instead, the light was reflected on the tree. To further conserve energy, the National Christmas Tree was lit not 24 hours a day but only from 5 to 10 p.m.

Public pressure on the Park Service and the energy crisis also led to changes in the 1973 Pageant of Peace. The Park Service used no cut trees, but instead obtained 57 live trees and planted them on the Ellipse. After the Pageant of Peace ended, the living trees were replanted in D.C. area parks or donated to the states they were intended to represent. These trees were decorated, but had no Christmas lights due to the energy crisis. Only footlights illuminated the Pageant's trees, primarily for safety reasons. Upset by a court ruling that held that the Christian nativity scene could not be included in the Pageant of Peace, local resident Vaughn Barkdoll and a few friends formed the Christian Heritage Association and won a permit to display a nativity scene just beyond the service road encircling the Ellipse. The Barkdoll display included four sheep, a donkey, and a Holstein calf. An American Legion post from Hyattsville, Maryland, erected a similar but smaller display on the opposite side of the Ellipse.

Energy conserving lights were used on the National Christmas Tree in 1974, however. More than 2,000 tiny amber and white lights (which used just a third of the wattage of pre-1973 strings of lights), as well as braided gold-colored rope and large gold ornaments, were used. The Pageant of Peace continued to feature just 57 trees, but there was competition over the nativity scene (which was no longer part of the festival). Barkdoll's Christian Heritage Association provided a creche with 2-foot (0.61 m) high plaster figures and no live animals. The Hyattsville American Legion provided a display with life-size papier-mâché figures and live animals including some sheep, a calf, and a burro. A third display was provided by the Christian Service Corps (a nondenominational Christian organization whose members mixed public service with missionary work). The Christian Service Corps display included live actors in period costumes, a musical soundtrack, three camels, a cow, a donkey, and 15 sheep.

In 1975, the National Christmas Tree had a Bicentennial theme. The tree was decorated with 4,600 red, white, and blue lights; red, white, and blue ornaments, and silver garland; and topped by a 4-foot (1.2 m) high gold and green Liberty Bell. The low-watt Christmas tree lights were specially designed by General Electric. In a circle around the National Christmas Tree were 13 tall evergreen trees, symbolizing the Thirteen Colonies. An additional 47 smaller trees formed the Pathway to Peace, representing the rest of the states, U.S. territories, POW/MIAs, and senior citizens. The 12,000 total light bulbs and 2-mile (3.2 km) of electrical cord used 40 percent less wattage than the year before. Once more, three different organizations provided three different nativity scenes away from the pageant. With the Bicentennial year ending, the 1976 National Christmas Tree was decorated with 2,500 red lamps (rather than strings of tree lights), which represented the theme "Youth." That year's Pageant of Peace was also truncated, presenting live entertainment only through December 23. However, there were now 60 trees in the Pathway to Peace.

By December 1976, it was clear that the National Christmas Tree planted just three years earlier was dying. The appearance of the tree had deteriorated significantly, with many of the lower branches dead or damaged and many parts of the tree showing large areas of dead needles. Government horticulturalists said the tree had suffered root damage and had not thrived in the hot, damp climate of Washington, D.C. David Rhoads, a citizen from Silver Spring, Maryland, donated his 25-foot (7.6 m) tall blue spruce to the National Park Service, chopped off its branches and wired many of them to the lower part of the existing tree to cover up the damage. The tree's plight was so obvious that the public made 112 offers for a new living tree to the government by early December.

The 1974 tree was removed and used for the Yule log in 1977. An anonymous resident of Potomac, Maryland donated a 34-foot (10 m) tall blue spruce as the new National Christmas tree. The new tree was planted on the Ellipse on November 3, 1977. President Jimmy Carter, assisted by his daughter, Amy, lit the tree during a ceremony on December 15, 1977. The tree was decorated with 2,000 five-watt green lamps (not bulbs) symbolizing "Hope," as well as 500 "twinkle lamps" and white ornaments. Due to the ongoing energy crisis, the tree was only lit from dusk to midnight from December 15 to December 26, and from dusk to 10 p.m. from December 27 to January 2. This achieved a further 74 percent reduction in energy use. A petting zoo was added to the Pageant of Peace for the first time.

The 1977 living tree did not last, however. January 1978 brought several severe rain and snow storms to the Washington, D.C., region, along with heavy winds, heavy precipitation, and extremes in temperatures. On January 26, 62 mph (100 km/h; 54 kn) winds whipped through the nation's capitol (and a tornado damaged homes in nearby Quantico, Virginia). Park Service officials feared the National Christmas Tree would be toppled, and attached guy-wires to the tree to keep it upright. But despite the additional bracing, the tree was nearly uprooted in mid-afternoon and leaned at a 45 degree angle for several hours until workers were able to get it upright again. A National Park Service spokesperson said that the agency feared the tree had suffered extensive root damage, and would not survive.

=== The third living tree: 1978 to 2010 ===
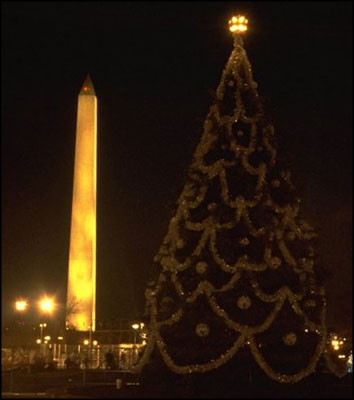
The Washington Monument glows behind the yet-to-be-lit 1979 U.S. National Christmas Tree.

The National Park Service undertook a lengthy study to find a species of tree that could thrive in the climate and soil conditions of the capital and better withstand the annual decoration process. Agency officials traveled more than 2,000 miles (3,200 km) to find a tree that met their specifications. A 30-foot (9.1 m) tall blue spruce, located at the home of the William E. Myers family of York, Pennsylvania, was chosen as the new National Christmas Tree planted in the Ellipse in 1978. (The Myerses offered to donate the tree, but were paid $1,500 for it.) A second tree, an 18-foot (5.5 m) tall blue spruce purchased from a nursery in New Jersey, was planted in a corner of the Ellipse in early summer 1978 for use as a spare in case the new transplanted tree did not survive. New, stronger cables were used to help brace the tree against high winds. The bronze plaque at the base of the tree was altered slightly to reflect the new date of the tree's transplanting (October 11, 1978).

The tree was topped off by first daughter Amy Carter on December 5, 1978, a ceremony which began a new tradition of having a member of the President or Vice President's family top off the tree (a tradition observed every year since except in 1980). President Carter, assisted by his wife Rosalynn and daughter Amy, lit the newly transplanted National Christmas Tree on December 15, 1978. The tree was illuminated by 1,600 low-watt gold lamps, floodlit with gold spotlights, and decorated with gold garland and 50 large red ornaments. Once more, each state and territory was represented by a tree on the Pathway of Peace, and the petting zoo and live reindeer both returned to the Pageant of Peace. Additionally, there was a small tree representing senior citizens, as well as a new "community tree."

In 1979, the National Christmas Tree was only partially lit. When President Jimmy Carter sent his daughter Amy to light the tree on December 13, the switch lit only the star atop the National Christmas Tree, while the state trees on the Pathway of Peace were illuminated only by tiny blue lights. Carter told the surprised crowd that the National Christmas Tree would remain dark until the American hostages in Iran were set free. The theme of the tree was "Hope and Light", which celebrated the 100th anniversary of Thomas Edison's invention of the practical incandescent light. The tree itself was trimmed with silver balls and white garland, and a complex, changing lighting scheme (also in white) designed. There were only 50 smaller trees that year (one for each of the hostages), and a single tree separate from the Pathway of Peace representing prisoners of war. Only nine days of musical performances were planned.

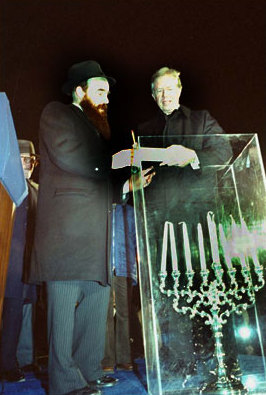
President Carter helps light the first National Menorah in 1979.

1979 also marked the first appearance of the National Menorah commemorating Hanukkah. The 30 feet (9.1 m) high steel menorah (painted gold) was the brainchild of Rabbi Abraham Shemtov, leader of the Chabad-Lubavitch movement. President Carter assisted Rabbi Shemtov in lighting the menorah, which was placed in Lafayette Square. By 1987, the National Menorah had been moved to the Ellipse. A new aluminum menorah replaced the steel one in 1998.

The National Christmas Tree again remained largely unlit in 1980. President Carter's five-year-old grandson, Jason, switched on the tree. The tree had been completely decorated with large balls and lights, but at a meeting in early December 1980 the families of the American hostages asked that the tree remain unlit. The lights on the tree shone for 417 seconds, one second for every day that the hostages had been captive. The lights were then turned off, leaving only the star atop the tree shining. When the hostages were released on January 20, 1981, the tree was redecorated. It was relit for the returning hostages on January 27. The year 1980 was also the first one that the Pageant of Peace organizers were required by the National Park Service to hold an open meeting to solicit input from the public. Once again, a separate small tree honored American prisoners of war.

Due to security concerns about assassination attempts, President Ronald Reagan lit the National Christmas Tree via remote control from the East Room of the White House in 1981, 1982, and 1983. Supporters of the Equal Rights Amendment and increased aid for the poor protested at the event. The lights on the 1981 tree suffered from faulty wiring, and could not be lit on the final night of the event (January 1, 1982). The year 1981 also marked the beginning of a number of changes to the Pageant of Peace. The petting zoo was canceled due to cost concerns, but for the first time each state or territory donated the ornaments to be used on their tree lining the Pathway of Peace. A request to honor Vietnam War veterans during the ceremony was turned down to keep the focus on Christmas. A new contractor, Westport Marketing Group, was also hired to manage the tree lighting ceremony. Westport changed the ceremony so that fewer guests sat on stage. This made room for more performers. Westport also suggested that more national celebrities be invited to perform as well to turn the event into a national (rather than local) event and boost the appeal to a national audience. Westport suggested even more radical reductions in the number of guests and field seating as well as elimination of the Yule log in 1982. There was also discussion of moving the entire event into the White House, but these suggestions were not acted on.

In 1984, First Lady Nancy Reagan lit the National Christmas Tree from the stage on the Ellipse. Westport Marketing Group proposed selling a National Christmas Tree ornament to raise money for the pageant, but the idea was discarded because it illegally commercialized a national civic event. President Reagan resumed his involvement with the tree lighting ceremony in 1985, when he and Nancy Reagan jointly lit the tree via remote control while standing on the South Portico of the White House. A large video screen depicted the Reagans for the crowd. As the Pageant of Peace opened, the Community for Creative Non-Violence (CCNV; an advocacy organization for the homeless founded by J. Edward Guinan, and at that time led by Mitch Snyder) sued to have a life-size statue of three homeless people huddled over a steam grate included in the event. On December 11, a federal district judge ruled against the organization. A federal appellate court upheld the decision. The group then applied for a regular protest permit, which it received. The statue of the homeless family was erected on Christmas Eve just outside the fence from the official pageant. Another change did occur, however. For the first time since 1954, there were no reindeer present at the Pageant of Peace. Officials said the cost of transporting the animals to and from Maine was too prohibitive. "Reindeer" (actually fallow deer from Virginia) returned to the pageant the following year.

President Reagan lit the tree from inside the White House in 1986, 1987, and 1988. The 1987 tree lighting ceremony was held on December 7 (almost a week early) due to the arrival of Soviet leader Mikhail Gorbachev for a summit meeting to be held December 8. American Marketing (the former Westport Marking) again proposed the sale of a tree ornament and was again turned down. Opposition to the nativity scene and menorah were again expressed, and CCNV again tried to get its statue of homeless people into the pageant (and was unsuccessful).

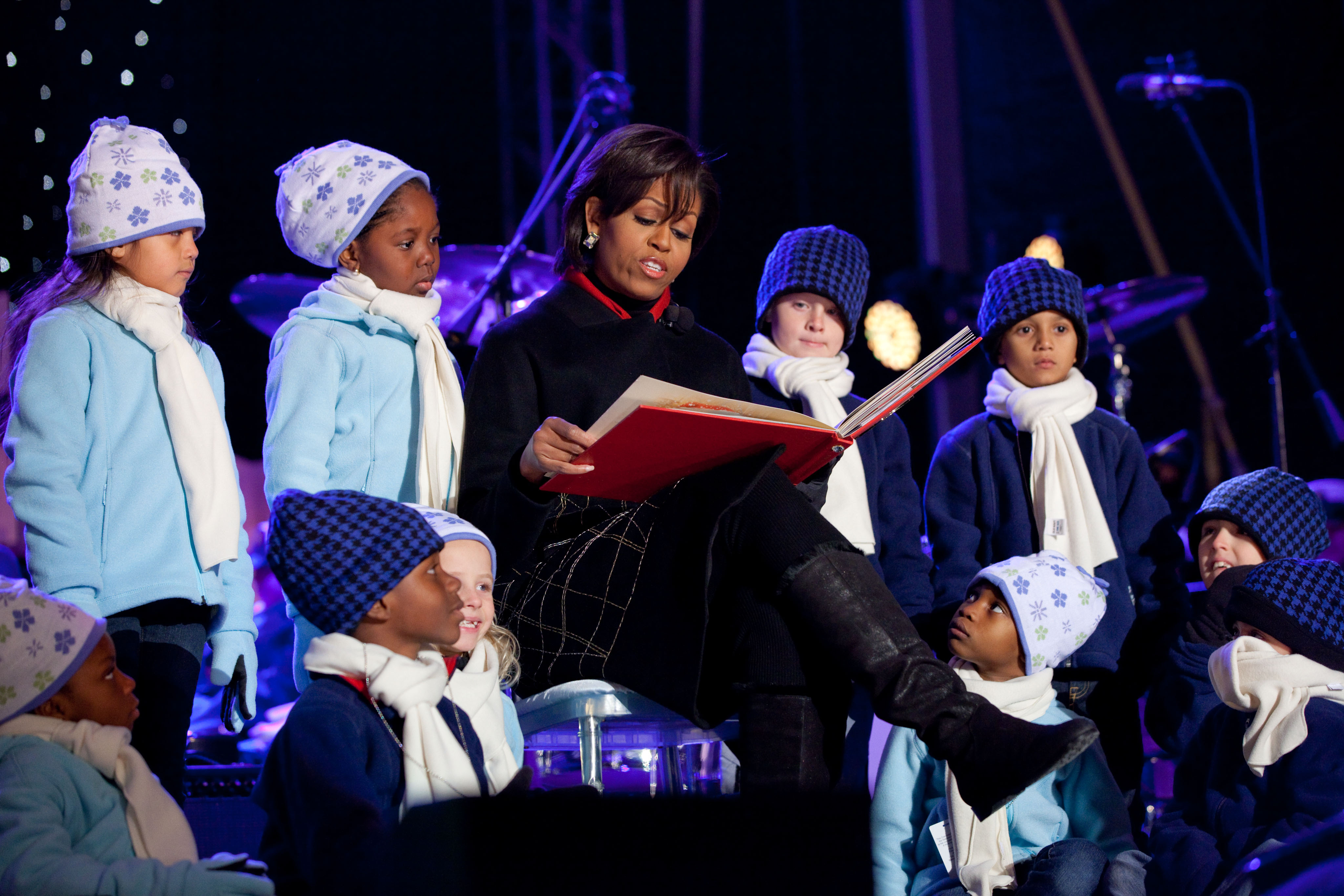
Michelle Obama reads "'Twas the Night Before Christmas" at the National Christmas Tree lighting ceremony on the Ellipse in Washington, D.C., on December 9, 2010.

President George H. W. Bush resumed the tradition of lighting the National Christmas Tree from a platform on the Ellipse in 1989. In 1991, President Bush presided over the tree-lighting ceremony with five Americans who had recently been released by their kidnappers in Lebanon: journalist Terry A. Anderson, university employee Joseph Cicippio, professor Alann Steen, professor Thomas Sutherland, and professor Jesse Turner. Also in attendance was Secretary-General of the United Nations Javier Pérez de Cuéllar, who had helped negotiate the release of the hostages. Anderson attempted to light the tree twice, but failed. Bush tried to the light the tree, and after several seconds the lights finally came on. In 1992, the National Park Service permitted the first National Christmas Tree ornament to be produced. The designer was Peggy Henkel, president of Georgetown Marketing Company (formerly American Marketing), and to avoid rules against commercialization the ornament was distributed without charge. The year 1992 was also the year that the National Christmas Tree and Pageant of Peace was featured on the official White House Christmas card. The card was created by artist Kamil Kubik and printed by Hallmark Cards.

Several changes were made to the National Christmas Tree and the Pageant of Peace in 1993 and 1994. Although organizers considered moving the pageant to the Washington Monument or onto the National Mall, no change in location was actually made. In 1994, a G scale model railway was placed around the base of the tree. A study by the National Renewable Energy Laboratory showed that solar lighting could be used to help illuminate the tree during the daytime, and the lights (donated by the United States Department of Energy) were used. The year 1994 also saw the first commercial sales of official National Christmas Tree items. The National Park Service approved the sales after organizers said proceeds would be used to fund the Pageant of Peace. Two items were sold: a National Christmas Tree ornament, and a limited edition Christmas card bearing an image of the tree.

But few other changes were made during the latter half of the 1990s. In 1995, the National Christmas Tree was lit by solar power for the first time at night, using energy stored during the day. The United States federal government shutdown of 1995 and 1996 forced the cancellation of the Pageant of Peace beginning December 16, although the National Park Service had enough funds to keep the tree lit through January 1, 1996. The park service also decided to discontinue the display of live deer during the pageant. In 1996, the Office of Surface Mining declined to donate trees for the Pageant of Peace (as it had done for many years). This forced the pageant organizers to purchase cut trees. Pageant organizers also sold 1,950 limited-edition prints and 250 artist's proofs by local artist G. Harvey to raise money for the pageant. Finally, the President's Park unit of the National Park Service began administering the music portion of the pageant.

The National Christmas Tree Growers Association provided cut trees for the Pageant of Peace in 1997, and another limited edition print was sold to raise money for the event. But in 1998, tree grower Ron Hudler of North Carolina agreed to begin donating cut trees for the festival. Polk Aristo-Craft began providing the model train, and for the first time refreshments were sold.

To celebrate the millennium on December 31, 1999, the National Christmas Tree's lights turned white at midnight. The following year, Polk Aristo-Craft expanded the model train display and a new wrought iron fence was erected around the tree (replacing an older chain-link fence).

In the wake of the September 11 attacks, the United States Secret Service announced on November 16 that only those individuals with tickets would be permitted onto the Ellipse for the December 6 tree lighting. The restrictions were lifted just 10 days later. Access to the Ellipse was closed except for two points (at 17th and E Streets NW and at 17th Street NW and Constitution Avenue NW). 15th Street NW was temporarily closed for the event, while traffic moved only in a north-bound direction on 17th Street NW. (The street closings during the ceremony continued to occur through the 2011 ceremony.) The original gold, green, and red lighting scheme was changed after September 11 to a patriotic red, white, and blue with red garland. The model train was provided again by Aristo-Craft, with financial, set-up, and other assistance from the National Capital Trackers (a model train enthusiasts group). Clowns, a magician, and a juggler were added to help lighten the crowd's mood.

Major changes to the lighting display and ornaments were made after 2001. In 2002, the National Christmas Tree sported a gold, green, and red design (again) with gold garland and wreath-shaped ornaments. For the first time, light-emitting diodes (LEDs) were used as part of the lighting scheme. Two strands of red LED lights were entwined with the garland. The incandescent tree lights changed from gold to green and back again continuously. The garland and lighted ornaments remained lit without a color change. The tree consumed enough power nightly to light two homes. The following year, the 80th anniversary of the tree-lighting ceremony, a nostalgic and simplified lighting design featuring 13,000 incandescent blue, gold, green, and red lights with lighted candle and snowflake ornaments was used. In 2004, holographic suncatchers were first used as ornaments on the tree, to help make it sparkle during daylight hours. A blue, gold, green, and red lighting scheme (composed of 15,000 incandescent bulbs) was used again, but de-emphasized the green in order to evoke a patriotic theme. One-hundred and thirty star-shaped ornaments also adorned the tree. A three-dimensional star made of Lexan topped the tree. The 2005 lighting design used 25,000 clear white incandescent lights. There were 105 large snowflake ornaments (each lit from within by 25 clear incandescent lights) with holographic blue vinyl accents, and a three-dimensional snowflake tree topper. Suncatchers were used also again. There were 105 snowflake-shaped suncatchers on the tree. A traditional lighting design returned in 2006. The tree featured 25,000 blue, green, orange purple, and red incandescent lights. Its 125 18-inch (46 cm) wide round ornaments with concave fronts. The glass fronts were reverse painted, while the concave area was covered in a gold holographic material that made the ornament appear to sparkle when lit. The tree topper was a star in three dimensions, with a holographic vinyl plate between the two to enhance its sparkle.

In 2007, LEDs replaced the incandescent lights on the National Christmas Tree. The tree's 1,000 feet (300 m) of red garland also used LEDs. The 2006 star-shaped tree-topper was reused, although it was reworked to use LEDs as well. According to the National Park Service officials, the tree was 100 times more energy efficient than in 2006 — although the lighting designer from General Electric said it was just 60 percent more energy efficient. The ornaments were 125 red bows 26 inches (66 cm) high and 20 inches (51 cm) wide. SABIC Innovative Plastics donated the Lexan used to make the ornaments. That same year, the tree lighting ceremony was officially named the Lighting of the National Christmas Tree. The Pageant of Peace was also officially renamed as "The National Christmas Tree and Pathway of Peace." LEDs replaced incandescent lights on the state trees along the Pathway of Peace, the lighted garland was omitted, and smaller illuminated ornaments were used in 2008, achieving an additional 50 percent savings in electricity. However, traditional bulbs were still used in the ornaments. A Santa's workshop was added to the pageant in 2008 as well. The lighting ceremony was dedicated to the memory of Ron Hudler.

The three-dimensional star tree topper first created in 2006 continued to top the National Christmas Tree in 2011.

=== Recent replacement living trees: 2011 to present ===
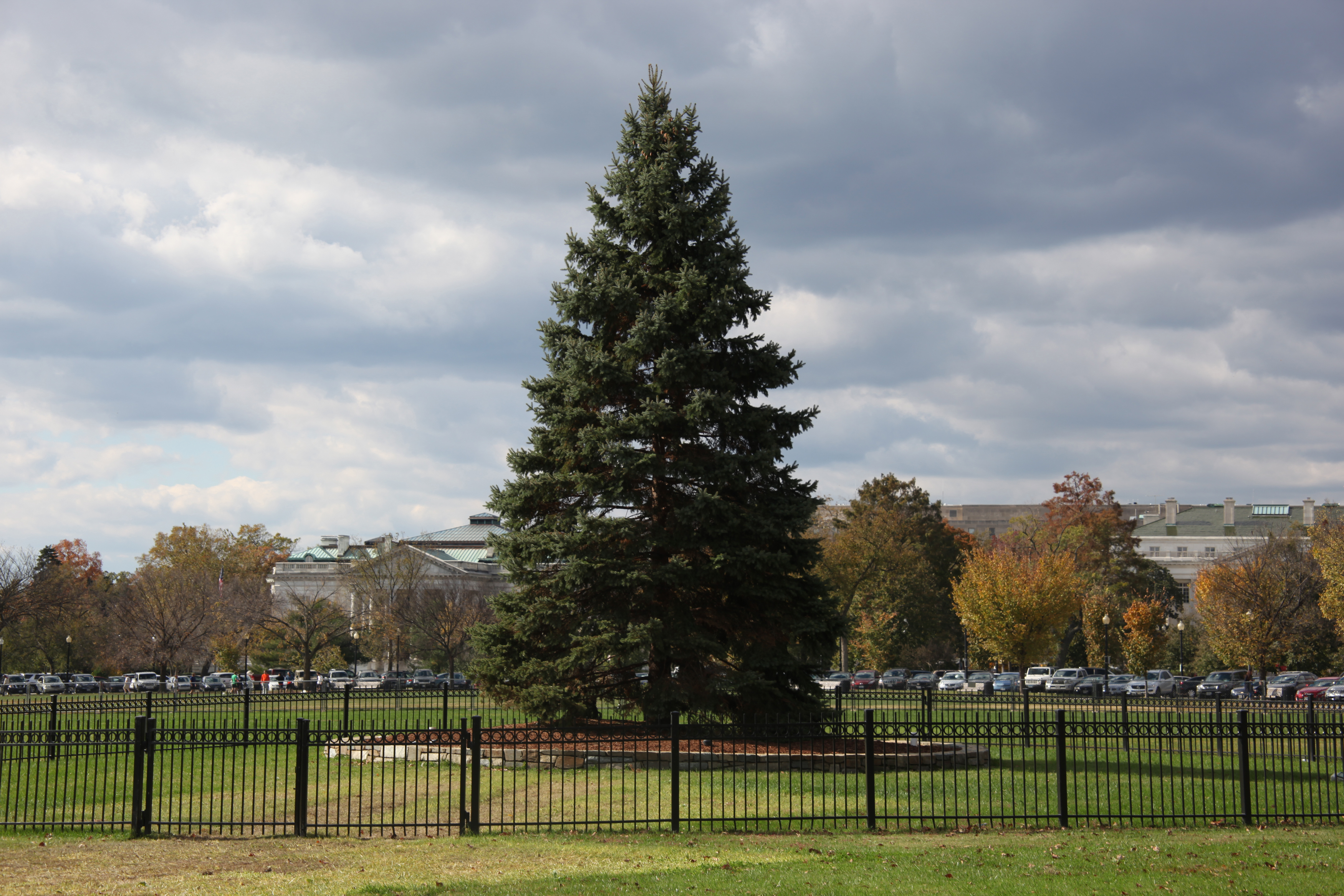
The replacement National Christmas Tree on November 2, 2012, six days after it was planted.

On Saturday, February 19, 2011, the National Christmas tree was felled after its trunk snapped in a windstorm which contained gusts of up to 50 mph (80 km/h; 43 kn). National Park Service spokesman Bill Line noted the tree was at risk since it stood alone exposed to the elements and lacked the protection of other trees. Knowing the tree was at risk and would eventually need to be replaced, a successor tree had already been selected. The new tree was planted on March 19, 2011. The new tree was a 26.5-foot (8.1 m) tall Colorado blue spruce which was obtained from an unnamed tree nursery in New Jersey.

On May 5, 2012, the blue spruce was declared dead by the National Park Service due to "transplant shock". The agency said the exceptionally warm summer of 2011 and the winter of 2011-2012 also played a role. The dead tree was cut down. The NPS said it had already identified a Colorado spruce as a replacement.

On Saturday, October 27, 2012, a 28-foot (8.5 m) Colorado blue spruce from Virginia was planted as the new National Christmas Tree. The Park Service decided to plant the tree even though Hurricane Sandy would pass near the D.C. area in less than 48 hours. Park Service horticulturists felt the tree was safer in the ground than in the container in which it was shipped. Wires were attached to the tree to help stabilize it, and a special base (hidden by mulch and soil) surrounded the roots to help prevent flooding.

For the first time in 50 years, the National Park Service did not have a Yule log during the 2012 Pageant of Peace. The performance stage was made much smaller and shifted from the east side of the display area to the south (so that the National Christmas Tree provided a backdrop for performances). Park Service personnel say that this interfered with the Yule log pit. The model railroad, nativity scene, Santa's Workshop, and state trees and Pathway of Peace remained in 2012. The Yule log pit remains, but is covered over by steel plates and 14 inches (36 cm) of soil and sod.

The lighting scheme for the National Christmas Tree was altered in 2013. General Electric provided the lights, as it had since 1962, and for the fourth year in a row LED lights were used. New round "sugar plum lights" in bright blue, green, and red colors were added in 2013 to enhance the tree's nighttime appearance. A garland of twinkling white 7-inch (18 cm) spherical ornaments were also added. The ornaments were lit during the day as well to improve the tree's daytime visual interest. The star-shaped tree topper was rebuilt for 2013 as well using a commercial lighting system to provide for brighter illumination. The lighting scheme used 60,000 LED lights strung in 110 nets and 225 strings, and 265 spherical ornaments. The lighting scheme weighed several hundred pounds, and used 5700 watts of power.

CNN said in 2013 that the National Christmas Tree was the sixth most beautiful Christmas tree in the world. The cable new channel listed 12 trees, and put the National Christmas Tree behind the tree erected in Cathedral Square, Vilnius, Lithuania; the Lego Christmas tree at Legoland Malaysia; the Rockefeller Center Christmas Tree at Rockefeller Center in New York City; the tree at the Galeries Lafayette department store in Paris, France; and the "Floating Christmas tree" erected by oil company Bradesco Seguros in Rio de Janeiro, Brazil.

The 2015 Christmas Tree was covered in amber and white lights that occasionally twinkled. The state and territory trees had the same color lights and were decorated with ornaments made from the state or territory they represented.

On December 21, 2018, a man climbed the illuminated Christmas Tree, damaging branches that were 15 feet (4.6 m) to 20 feet (6.1 m) high, as well as its lights. Police detained the man after coaxing him down from the tree, whereupon first responders transported him to the District of Columbia's Comprehensive Psychiatric Emergency Program for a mental health evaluation. The government never charged the man with a crime.

On October 26, 2019, the National Park Service and a tree company planted a new tree to replace the one that the climber had damaged. The U.S. government paid the company $163,984 for the 30 feet (9.1 m) Colorado blue spruce from Palmyra, Pennsylvania, which was the sixth living tree planted at the site. The White House paid $180,633 for the 2019 lighting ceremony, which was the third in which President Donald Trump participated.

On November 30, 2022, President Joe Biden lighted the National Christmas Tree on the Ellipse near the White House and celebrated the 100th year since the first lighting by President Calvin Coolidge on December 24, 1923. The tree, a 27-foot white fir, had 64,000 Christmas lights. The event was hosted by LL Cool J and performances were prepared by United States Marine Band, Andy Grammer, Ariana DeBose, Joss Stone, Gloria Estefan, Shania Twain and Yolanda Adams.

A new tree was placed in November 2023 after the previous one was infected with a fungal disease. On November 28, 2023, strong winds made the tree fall over, but it was put back up. A red spruce from Virginia was used as the National Christmas Tree the following year and in 2025 as well.

== Locations of the National Christmas Tree ==
The National Christmas Tree is a living evergreen tree planted in the Ellipse in the President's Park, close to the Zero Milestone but just east of the central north–south axis. In early 1974, a low stone wall was constructed around the National Christmas Tree to provide partial protection for its roots, and currently serves as the limit of the planting bed below the tree. In 2001, a cast-iron fence was built around the tree about 30 feet (9.1 m) from the low stone wall to protect the soil from compaction by the thousands of people who visit the tree annually.

A temporary gravel road is constructed in the northeast quadrant of the Ellipse each year to give workers access to the tree for decoration. A wooden snow fence is installed near the tree and around the Pageant of Peace area each year as well to protect the lawn during periods of high foot traffic.

According to the National Park Service, since the National Christmas Tree and its associated ceremonies go back to a historic period in the nation's history, this cultural event has not only become historically important itself but has helped to protect the historic integrity of the Ellipse. The agency says that the tree has become "a defining feature of President's Park South". Visitors also have a view of the south front of the White House illuminated with its own Christmas decorations.

A "backup National Christmas Tree" is occasionally mentioned by many sources. This tree is located southwest of Ellipse Road, where the path from the 17th Street NW and Constitution Avenue NW meets the Ellipse sidewalk. This tree was planted by the National Park Service as a replacement for the National Christmas Tree. However, this tree is not historic, did not grow well, and by 2010 was not considered as a backup for the National Christmas Tree any longer. When cut trees were used, backup trees were also identified. In 1971, the National Park Service revealed that it required four trees to be selected as "the" National Christmas Tree. One would be the actual tree used; two would be replacement trees in case some accident befell the primary tree; and the fourth tree was cut up and its branches used to fill out bare spots in the primary tree.

== Sources of National Christmas Trees ==
Cut evergreen trees were used in 1923 and from 1954 to 1972. Living trees were used from 1924 to 1953, and again from 1973 to the present (2022). The species, height, and sources of these trees have varied widely over time.

== Organizing and decorating the National Christmas Tree ==
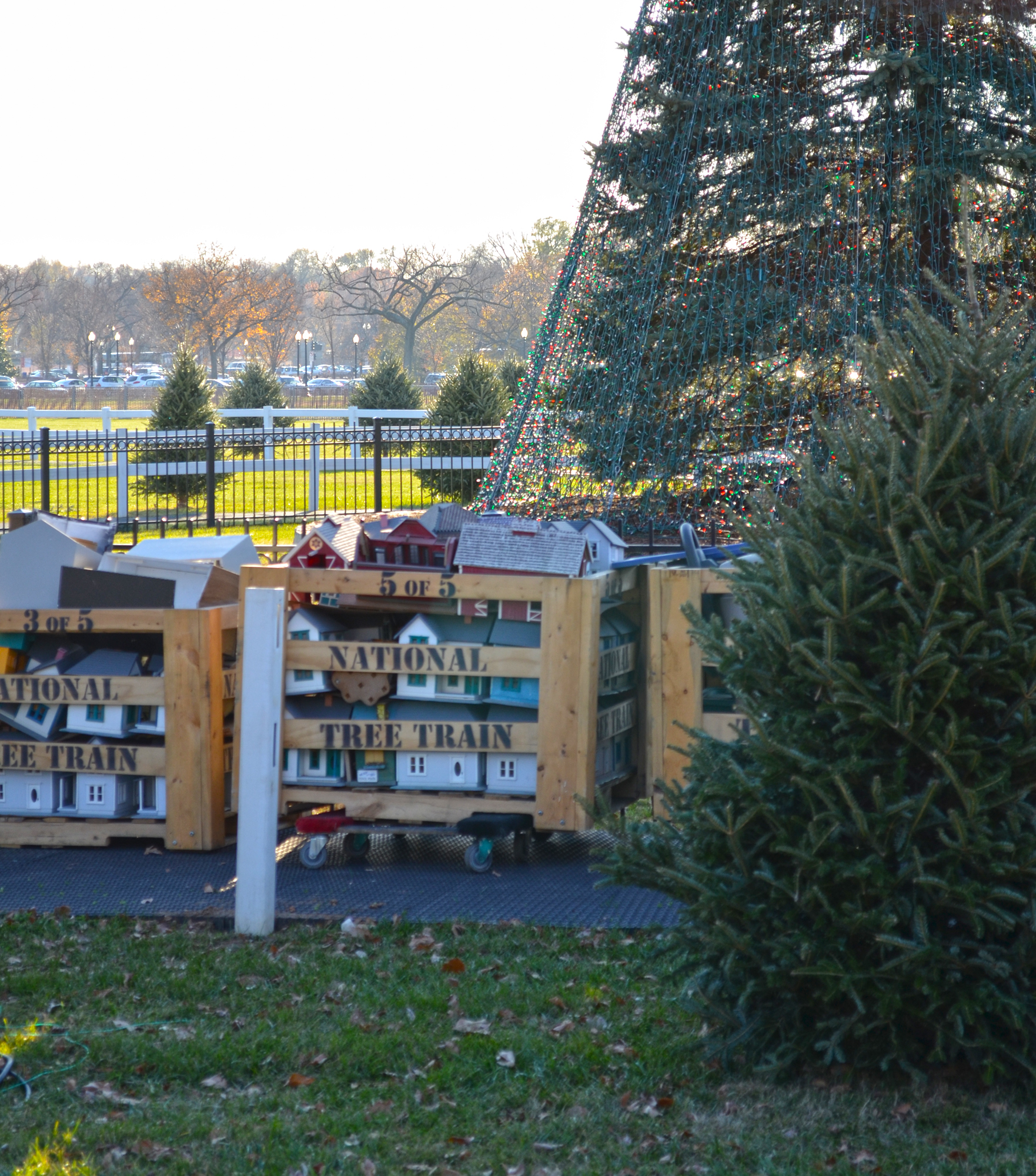
The model railroad train is ready to be unpacked and set up at the base of the 2012 U.S. National Christmas Tree. An undecorated "state tree" is to the right.

Creating the design of the National Christmas Tree and organizing the Pageant of Peace is a year-long process. In 1999, the Washington Post reported that General Electric (GE) lighting designers begin sketching plans for the lighting scheme in March. In 2004, they began their design efforts in February. GE changes the design every year. The lights are manufactured at a GE plant in Cleveland, Ohio, and are tested on a tree at GE's headquarters in Fairfield, Connecticut, in mid-October to ensure that the design looks right and nothing is technically wrong with it.

Contractors begin soliciting ornaments for the trees along the Pathway of Peace about the same time, usually around a theme. Other vendors begin contacting nationally known singers, performers, and the providers of children's characters (such as Warner Bros. Animation, Sesame Workshop, or The Walt Disney Company) for their availability. Various contractors build the decorations, depending on what is required. In 2000, Brilliant Electric Sign Co. of Cleveland, Ohio, spent four weeks building the 200 ornaments required for that year's display. Many of the decorations in 2000 and 2002 were manufactured with the same high-tech plastic used to make the faceplates of astronaut helmets.

During the summer, National Park Service workers apply a pesticide to the tree to kill red spider mites (which can kill evergreen trees). The tree is also checked so that rodents do not take up residence in its roots or branches. The tree is pruned yearly, and fertilized every three years.

The 8 feet (2.4 m) high Fraser Firs for the Pathway of Peace are cut in early November.

Hargrove Inc., a company which provides trade show and custom exhibits, begins decorating all the trees with the lights and decorations about 10 days before the tree lighting ceremony is set to occur. (As of 2001, Hargrove had decorated the tree every year since 1954.) The lights and decorations do not actually hang from the National Christmas Tree itself. Rather, they hang from guy-wires which run up the sides of the tree. In 2008, it took 15 people to decorate the tree.

The National Christmas Tree can be covered with fewer or greater lights, depending on the lighting scheme. In 1999, 5,000 feet (1,500 m) of lights containing 75,000 bulbs were used. In 2000, however, 125,000 lights (using 75,000 watts) were used. There were 200,000 bulbs in 2002, but just 13,000 in 2003 (the year a more traditional lighting scheme was used). In 2008, after the switch to LED lights, the National Christmas Tree was illuminated by more than 45,000 lights on 900 50-light strings. About 34,000 LED lights were used on the branches, with the remainder used to light ornaments and the tree topper. Improvements in LED technology meant that 100 fewer strings were used than in 2007 (the first year LED lighting was used). By 2010, although the number of LED lights had increased to 81,104, the number of strings had been reduced to 750. The National Christmas Tree and Pathway of Peace trees consumed 7,000 watts over four weeks in 2010, at a cost of about $180. (The National Christmas Tree alone consumed 2,000 watts in 2011.) The lighting scheme used 60,000 LED lights and 265 spherical ornaments in 2013, while consuming just 5700 watts.

It took 173 feet (53 m) of incandescent lights (containing 225 small bulbs) and about 50 ornaments to decorate each state tree in 1999. By 2008, after the switch to LED lights, it took six to seven strings of clear LEDs lights to decorate each state tree.

To provide electricity to the National Christmas Tree and all the trees in the Pathway of Peace, up to 6 miles (9.7 km) of electrical cord was laid in 2000 — all connected to an underground electrical system.

Aristo-Craft Trains originally donated, set up, and ran the model trains at the base of the tree. Gravel was placed in each engine and car so that wind could not blow them off the tracks. By 2008, sponsorship of the train had expanded to include Bachmann Industries, BridgeWorks, Garden Metal Models, Hartland Locomotive Works, LGB, Mainline America, Sound Traxx, Split Jaw Rail Clamps, and USA Trains. The train expanded from two trains to nine trains and three trolley lines (running in more than 1,000 feet (300 m) of track) in 2008. National Capital Trackers as well as other model railroading groups continued to set up, run, and maintain the model train.

=== The modern Pageant of Peace and Pathway of Peace ===
As of 2010, 56 smaller cut evergreen trees representing the states, District of Columbia, and unincorporated territories of the United States are arranged in a large oval around the National Christmas Tree each December. A sign in front of each tree identifies which geographic area the small tree represents. A temporary black plastic walkway is laid down to provide pedestrian access (the actual Pathway of Peace), and the trees guarded by a white vinyl picket fence. The National Park Service lays boardwalks, plastic paths, and artificial turf walkways on the Ellipse beginning in October.

A stage and a blue plywood amphitheater are erected southeast of the National Christmas Tree, and the placement of heavy plastic mats and metal folding chairs in front of the stage (with seating for only 200 people at most) creates an audience area for performances. A plywood nativity scene, 15-by-10-foot (4.6 by 3.0 m) Yule log fire pit, and barn for donkeys, reindeer, and sheep are built south of the Pathway of Peace. Speakers on high stands throughout the area broadcast the live performances, or provide recorded music for viewers' enjoyment. Since the Pageant of Peace and Pathway of Peace are traditions extending back only to 1954, they are not considered historic elements by the National Park Service.

== Legal issues ==
Several times, the Pageant of Peace has been the subject of legal dispute.

The first legal challenge occurred in 1968 when the American Civil Liberties Union (ACLU) objected to the inclusion of the Christian nativity scene in the pageant. The ACLU argued the display violated the Establishment Clause of the First Amendment to the United States Constitution. Although the National Park Service responded that the nativity scene was not religious per se but a symbol "of the national holiday", the agency did agree not to store, maintain, or erect the display (turning those duties over to Pageant of Peace, Inc., in September 1968). The legal effort to remove the creche continued the following year. In 1969, three clergymen, an atheist, and a member of the Ethical Society sued to have the nativity scene removed. Once more, the Park Service said the nativity scene was merely a symbol of "our spiritual heritage" and "wholly secular". The U.S. Court of Appeals for the District of Columbia Circuit denied on December 12, 1969, a request for a temporary injunction barring construction of the display. The court's ruling said it would decide the case on its merits at a later date. The five plaintiffs were represented by the ACLU, and joined by the American Jewish Congress.

In April 1970, the court of appeals ordered a full trial on the issue. Although the trial was set for February 1, 1971, the plaintiffs and ACLU declined to seek a temporary injunction against the display in December 1970 in favor of a permanent resolution of the issue. On November 3, 1971, the U.S. District Court for the District of Columbia ruled in Allen v. Morton, 333 F.Supp. 1088, (D.D.C. 1971), that inclusion of the nativity display did not violate the Establishment Clause of the Constitution. The court said that the purpose of the event was purely secular (to increase tourism and shopping in the city), and that was determinative. But on September 26, 1973, a unanimous three-judge panel of the U.S. Court of Appeals for the D.C. Circuit overturned the district court's ruling. The appellate court held that the commercial nature of the event did not mean that the creche lost its religious meaning, and that the government's involvement in displaying the creche was not the absolute minimum necessary to meet the Supreme Court's constitutional tests. The appellate court did not explicitly bar the government from allowing the nativity display, but laid out very specific rules under which the government's participation could occur. Beginning in 1973, the American Christian Heritage Association (a group based in Prince George's County, Maryland) began hosting a private nativity display complete with live animals on the Ellipse.

In 1978, another lawsuit over the Pageant of Peace was filed. The government had banned all groups not associated with the Pageant of Peace from the Ellipse (even though it only used a one-fourth of the Ellipse's total area for the pageant), but permitted them to use lightly wooded areas nearby. The government argued that it had to avoid any appearance of government sponsorship of any religion and to be even-handed with all groups. The Christian Service Corps sued, arguing in the U.S. District Court for the District of Columbia on December 16, 1978, that it was unreasonable to keep all groups off the Ellipse during this time. On December 20, the court ruled that the Park Service's rules did not violate Christian Service Corps' constitutional rights.

The nativity scene returned as part of the official Pageant of Peace in 1984. On March 5, 1984, the Supreme Court of the United States held in Lynch v. Donnelly, 465 U.S. 668, that a Christian nativity scene was a secular symbol which served secular purposes. It held that the city of Pawtucket, Rhode Island, could include this display in its government-sponsored holiday display. Citizens for God and Country, a one-person organization based in Virginia, asked the National Park Service to include a nativity scene in the 1984 Pageant of Peace. The Anti-Defamation League of B'nai B'rith protested its inclusion. The same year, additional Jewish groups challenged the existence of the National Menorah as equally offensive to the constitutional principal of separation of church and state. Nonetheless, both displays remained as part of the Pageant of Peace.

== See also ==
- Capitol Christmas Tree
- General Grant tree, also proclaimed the "Nation's Christmas Tree"
- Rockefeller Center Christmas Tree
- Vatican Christmas Tree
- White House Christmas tree
- List of individual trees

== Bibliography ==
- Christmas in Washington, D.C. Chicago: World Book. 1998.
- Crump, William D. (2006). The Christmas Encyclopedia. Jefferson, N.C.: McFarland & Co.
- Domke, David Scott; Coe, Kevin M. (2010). The God Strategy: How Religion Became a Political Weapon in America. New York: Oxford University Press.
- Ford, Elise (2011). Frommer's Washington, D.C., 2012. Indianapolis, Ind.: Frommer's.
- Gilbert, Robert E. (1998). The Mortal Presidency: Illness and Anguish in the White House. New York: Fordham University Press.
- Graff, Henry Franklin (2002). The Presidents: A Reference History. New York: Simon and Schuster.
- Harris, Jessie Eubank (1963). Legends and Stories of Famous Trees. Philadelphia: Dorrance.
- Leinwand, Gerald (2001). 1927: High Tide of the Twenties. New York: Four Walls Eight Windows.
- Menendez, Albert J. (1983). Christmas in the White House. Louisville, Ky.: Westminster John Knox Press.
- Park Cultural Landscapes Program (2010). National Park Service Cultural Landscapes Inventory: President's Park South, President's Park. National Park Service: U.S. Department of the Interior.
- Schom, Alan (2004). The Eagle and the Rising Sun: The Japanese-American War, 1941-1943, Pearl Harbor Through Guadalcanal. New York: W.W. Norton.
- Seeley, Mary Evans (1998). Season's Greetings From the White House. Tampa, Fla.: A Presidential Christmas.
- Shemanski, Frances (1984). A Guide to Fairs and Festivals in the United States. Westport, Conn.: Greenwood Press.
