= The Army Hour =

American radio news program (1942–1945)

- Genre: Army-related news
- Running time: Originally 1 hour Later 30 minutes
- Country of origin: United States
- Language: English
- Syndicates: NBC
- Announcer: George F. Putnam
- Written by: Wyllis Cooper
- Directed by: Wyllis Cooper; Robert Clarke Coleson
- Produced by: Wyllis Cooper; Robert Clarke Coleson; Edwin L. Dunham; Jack Harris
- Original release: April 5, 1942 – November 11, 1945

The Army Hour was a radio news program in the United States, broadcast on NBC April 5, 1942-Nov. 11, 1945.

Planning for The Army Hour, with Colonel Edward M. Kirby in charge, began soon after the Japanese attack on Pearl Harbor. Sponsored by the War Department and the U.S. Army, the program brought "on-the-spot stories and demonstrations from Army bases and fields of battle" to listeners back home in America. The program was "an attempt to bring the reality of the war home to the American people through the power and immediacy of radio." One reviewer wrote in a newspaper that the secretary of war had compared The Army Hour broadcasts to "full-scale military operations ... as far as communications are concerned," and the writer agreed. NBC's investment was significant, also. In 1957, CBS executive Lou Cowan (who helped to develop The Army Hour while working with the Office of War Information) said that the program was "presented at an annual cost of a half-million dollars to the network [NBC] with no financial return."

Radio historian John Dunning wrote that the program "gave Americans their first in-depth look at the war and how it was being fought," and a 1942 article in the trade publication Billboard described it as "a weekly official message and a source of authoritative information from the Army to the civilian population of the country..." In 1943, another article in Billboard commented about Army Hour: "excellent substitute for first-hand knowledge of war; genuine picture of what loved ones are living thru; calm and objective presentation of facts of war."

== Background ==
Another program named Army Hour existed before the one heard on NBC. That 30-minute variety show was broadcast on WRBL in Columbus, Ga., by personnel from Fort Benning. Its first broadcast was on March 16, 1940.

The first broadcast of the network program, on April 5, 1942, came on the 25th anniversary of the United States' entrance into World War I. Within its first year on the air, it had added "the only official 'communique' regularly announced by an officer of the General Staff Corps," as "Col. R. Ernest Dupuy, Chief of the News Division of the Bureau of Public Relations, War Department, now reports each week from Washington."

== Personnel ==
Much of the work on The Army Hour involved military personnel. Frequent changes in assignments made listing of those involved in programs difficult. The following are some people whose key roles can be documented:

- Announcer: George F. Putnam
- Music directors/orchestra leaders: Jack Joy and Leo Kempinski
- Producers: Edwin L. Dunham, Jack Harris
- Producer/director: Robert Clarke Coleson
- "Voice of the Army": Albert L. Warner
- Writer/producer: Wyllis Cooper

Besides those regularly employed on the program, speakers included Army officers (many of them generals) and United Nations officials.

== Logistics ==
=== Locations ===
Unlike most radio programs, in which the activity was controlled in a studio, material for The Army Hour came from far and wide -- "as 'global' as the war itself." An article in Radio Guide magazine reported:

"Army Hour" producers travel the United States by every known means of Army transportation. They pop up at morning mess with the parachute infantry; they ride the armored force's tanks; they sweat out an artillery problem with a jackass battery; not long ago one had to bail out of an airplane over a Mississippi swamp -- but he made his broadcast.

William Burke Miller of NBC wrote in a trade publication, "The outstanding feature of the hour-long Sunday program is its elaborate use of remote broadcasts." In the program's first nine months, international pickups had come from locations that include Chungking, Panama, New Delhi, Cairo, London, Leopoldville, Moscow, Melbourne, Algiers, Ireland, Iceland, and the Caribbean.

The extent of The Army Hour's use of remotes was quantified in a Western Electric publication when an article noted that in its first 18 months of broadcasting, the program's signals logged "a grand total of 1,621,000 miles traveled during the 78 hour-long broadcasts."

An NBC executive wrote that each domestic remote broadcast "requires an announcer, a production director, one or two engineers, at least one microphone, a 'remote' outfit, a field phone direct to Radio City, Army passes for the proper people, plus all the advance arrangements so that the right soldiers and equipment will be at the right place."

=== Jamming of signals ===
In addition to challenges with regard to production, technicians with The Army Hour had to deal with jamming (intentional interference with transmitted signals). Jamming affected not the final AM transmissions in the United States but the shortwave signals that were used to connect remote sources to the main studio. A 1942 newspaper article reported that a Nazi radio station in Germany featuring "a pianist [who] played as loudly as he could" tried to jam a shortwave signal from Dutch Guiana. Columnist Drew Pearson noted another instance when a speech by Winston Churchill was jammed. Pearson added that the Army had located the sources of the interfering transmissions and "proposes to retaliate if this deliberate interference isn't stopped." By September 1944, however, William S. Paley, chief of radio for the Supreme Allied Headquarters in Europe, announced, "The Allies have won the battle of the airwaves hands down." Although Paley's comments focused on attempts to jam shortwave broadcasts to troops, the article noted that jamming of transmissions for use in The Army Hour had been circumvented by using recorded material rather than live shortwave transmissions.

=== Censorship ===
Miller wrote, "A program that is as close to the armed forces as is 'The Army Hour' stands in constant danger of revealing vital information." Despite that danger, the program's producers consistently managed to keep American listeners informed without "revealing vital information."

=== Technology ===
In 1943, NBC waived its own rule against using recordings in order to broadcast details of a battle in Sicily and what the soldiers involved felt and said. Army Signal Corps personnel recorded the material on sound films, which were edited and transferred to disc for use on The Army Hour.

A new development in recording technology, wire recording, helped The Army Hour with both transmission of programs to soldiers and coverage of war activities. A 1943 newspaper story reported that a spool of wire "no larger than the ordinary doughnut" could record The Army Hour and two newscasts in the United States. The wire was then flown to Algiers for transmission to troops. The same technology eventually was used to record reports that were broadcast as part of The Army Hour. A story in Broadcasting magazine in 1945 told of one reporter's capturing the sounds of war from "the lead plane of the Allied airborne invasion of Germany" and another's preparing a report via wire recording of 10 hours of bombardment.

== Popularity and recognition ==
By the time it had been on air for three months, The Army Hour had become the highest-rated Sunday daytime program as measured by Hooper Ratings. At that time, it was carried by 115 domestic radio stations and transmitted outside the United States by six shortwave stations. A trade publication reported on two ways in which the audience was supplemented:

- Some stations recorded The Army Hour broadcasts and played the recordings for re-broadcasts to accommodate additional listeners.
- "As a service to war workers unable to hear the program at its scheduled time, many stations have been offering transcriptions to the factories which they may present over the plant's public address system at convenient times like lunch hour and rest periods."

The Army Hour received a number of awards, some of which were as follows:

- 1942 -- "Best Government War Program," Motion Picture Daily's annual radio poll
- 1942 -- "Favorite War Program," Cleveland Plain Dealer Readers Poll
- 1943 -- "Best Government War Program," Motion Picture Daily's annual radio poll
- 1944 -- "Best Government Program," 13th Annual Poll of Radio Editors
- 1944 -- "Favorite Wartime Show," Radio Daily poll
- 1945 -- "Best Program Produced By Army or Government Bureau, or in Interest of War," 14th Annual Radio Editors' Poll

The Army Hour also had a different kind of popularity in more personal ways when a local member of the Army was involved, as illustrated by two anecdotes.

- In 1943, a Bowling Green, Ky., newspaper reported, "'Half the town called a halt to usual Sunday afternoon pleasures' to tune in to the 'Army Hour' radio program and listen to one of their own, Brig. Gen. Victor Herbert Strahm, detail an important low-level bombing attack..."
- In 1944, 1st Lt. John Markowitz of Cartaret, N.J., gave his first-hand account of leading an assault on a German-held fort. A newspaper report noted: "The sound of his voice was especially welcome to his parents, for he had been reported captured." The reporter added that members of Markowitz's church heard him on The Army Hour while attending a war-relief meeting.

== Adaptations ==
- In October 1942, the impact of The Army Hour was such that officials from the British Army sought to implement a similar program "to be shortwaved to the far-flung forces of the empire." At the time, The Army Hour was "rated as the dominant program of the week."
- Also in October 1942, a trade publication reported on plans to produce a movie short, The Army Hour, which would feature the program's announcer, George F. Putnam.
- A television program, The Armed Forces Hour, was broadcast October 30, 1949 - June 11, 1950, on NBC and February 4, 1951 - May 6, 1951, on the DuMont Television Network. The 30-minute program "culled from the estimated 500 million feet of film already on hand." It also featured music by service members, including The Singing Sergeants and the U.S. Navy Dance Band.
- In 1953, the Armed Forces Radio Network revived the original program's concept and titled it Army Hour. An article in Broadcasting magazine said that the original program's content would be maintained and that NBC would broadcast episodes domestically.
- By 1956, the revised Army Hour was on Mutual. It was still listed among that network's commercial AM programs in 1963.
- Millard Lampell wrote a book, "The Long Way Home," that contained material from some of The Army Hour broadcasts. All of Lampell's royalties from the book's sales were contributed to the Committee for Air Forces Convalescent Warfare.
