= Fred Blum =

German-American social scientist (1914 – 1990)

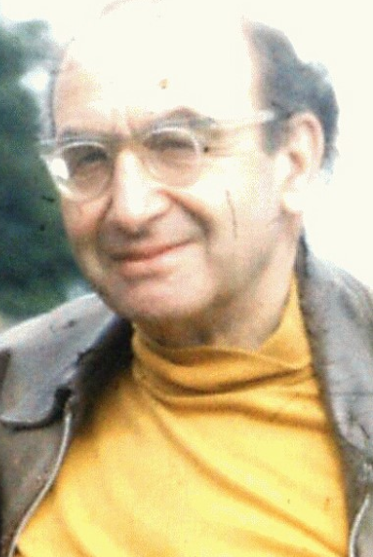
Fred Blum

Fred Johannes Blum (1914–1990) was an American social scientist and the founder of The New Era Centre.

Blum was born 1914 in Mannheim, Germany to a liberal, professional Jewish family. In the 1930s he went to study social sciences at the University of Geneva, Switzerland. By 1938 he could see no future in Hitler's Nazi Germany and in 1939 he left his family behind, emigrating to the United States to undertake a doctorate at the University of California and later becoming an American citizen. Many members of Blum's family, including his parents, were murdered in the Holocaust (his mother in the Auschwitz concentration camp).

== Life ==
Blum became a member of the Quakers whilst maintaining his Jewish heritage. He held several academic positions in the United States, such as at Howard University where he taught economics, Visiting professor at Harvard University, fellow of the University of Michigan (1949–1954) and associate professor at the University of Minnesota (1955–1959), where he met his wife Arna. In 1955, he was consultant for the US Senate Committee on labour and public welfare, which was then chaired by John F. Kennedy. In 1963, Blum resigned from his academic posts in the United States and pursued a future based in the United Kingdom. In 1967, Blum founded the charitable organisation The New Era Centre, developing his thinking and writing on spiritual aspects of social witness and action. He believed that "people of spiritual commitment from all faiths and none, must together be witness to ways of establishing a new era of truth and justice".

In 1969, Blum met Bishop Stephen Verney at a conference in Coventry where Verney was doing reconciliation work. They became friends, “like brothers”, and Verney became a trustee and significant supporter and contributor to the creation and work of The New Era Centre at The Abbey, which became a registered charity on 20 December 1979. Verney was a well-connected individual, and frequently communicated with the politician Roy Jenkins. The residential community of The New Era Centre in The Abbey was dedicated on 4 October 1981 as a space to explore and work towards the synthesis of Christianity and more contemporary understandings of societal transformation. In 1984, after The Abbey was improved to a habitable state, the first two resident community members moved in. Stephen Verney extensively discussed, and believed in, the role Buddhist practice and philosophy could play in increasing connectivity with a Christian deity, and it was this belief which led many of The New Era Centre's early pursuits.

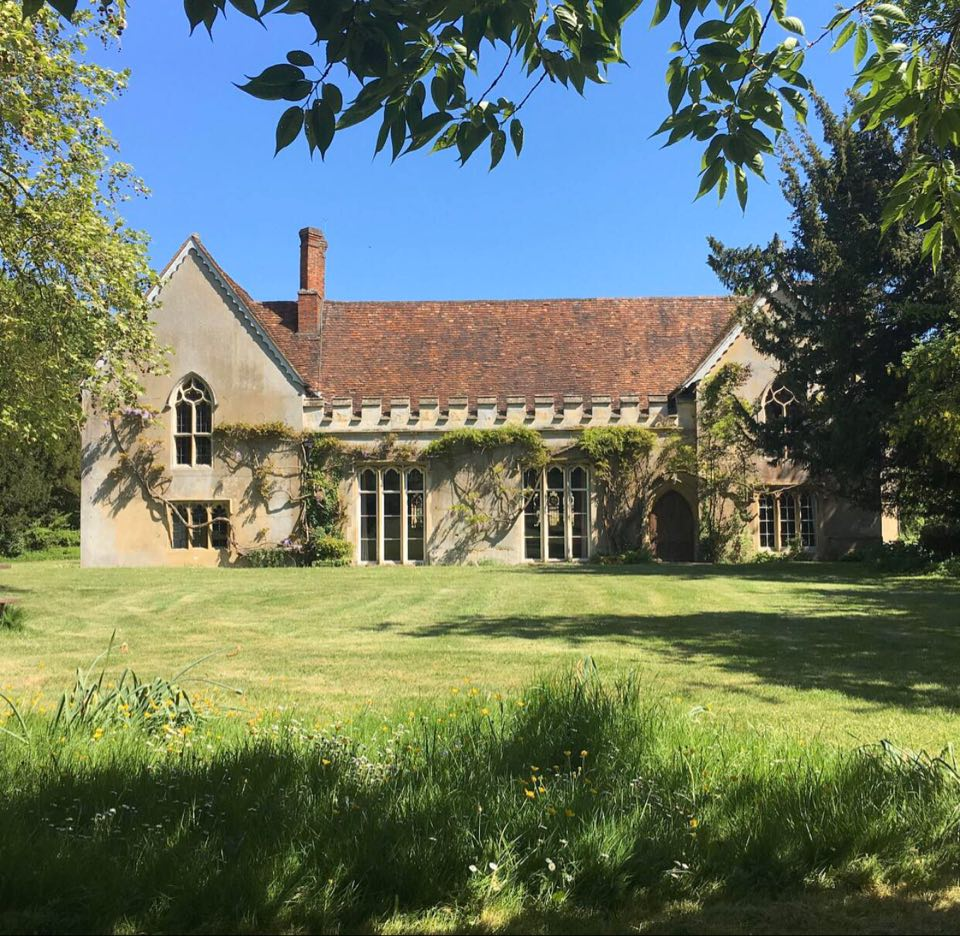
The Abbey, Sutton Courtenay, home to The New Era Centre.

In 1978, David Astor sold The Abbey, Sutton Courtenay and after ownership by property developers it was sold in 1980 to The New Era Centre. Twentieth-century landowners had to contend with various states of disrepair, and few have had either the capital or the will to sustain the business. Upon the purchase of The Abbey by The New Era Centre in 1980, a monumental effort was required to source volunteer labour, both locally and from abroad. Sourcing funding was difficult, and some potential investors remained unconvinced that the founders high ideals could lead to anything other than a misuse of funds. However, Blum and Verney remained committed to their project. Much of the work was carried out in a co-operative form, such as the 'work camp' of 1981, a community of enthusiastic volunteers. Volunteers from organisations such as WWOOF UK and HelpX still play a vital role in keeping The Abbey alive. In August 1991, the charity was renamed 'The Abbey, Sutton Courtenay'.

Blum spent decades researching, interviewing and publishing on Mahatma Gandhi's life works and legacy. He led the "Gandhi Interview Project" in the 1970s and early 80s. Much of Blum's work can now be found in The Abbey's library.

In 1986, Blum decided to be baptised into the Anglican Church and a few months later he was ordained as priest. In December 1989, Blum had a severe stroke which deprived him of speech. He could not imagine a life without this expression and chose to eat nothing, dying in the beginning of January 1990.

== Selected works ==
- Work and Community (Routledge Kegan Paul, 1968)
- The Ethics of Industrial Man (Routledge 1970)
