= The Abbey, Sutton Courtenay =

Grade I listed English country house in the United Kingdom

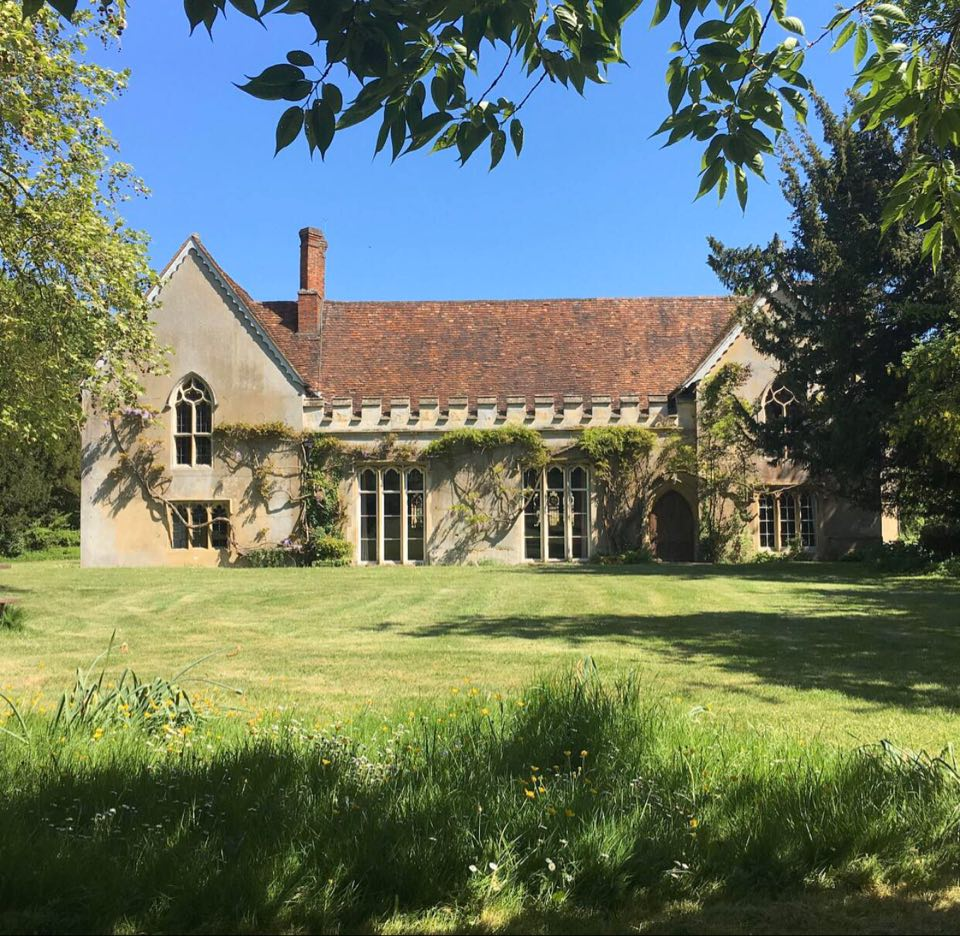
- The Abbey as seen from the west.
- Interactive map of the The Abbey, Sutton Courtenay area

General information
- Status: Grade I-listed
- Type: Courtyard house
- Location: The Green; Sutton Courtenay; Nr. Abingdon; OX14 4AF, England, United Kingdom
- Coordinates: 51°38′33″N 1°16′30″W
- Construction started: 13th century
- Owner: The Abbey, Sutton Courtenay Limited

Website
- theabbey.uk.com

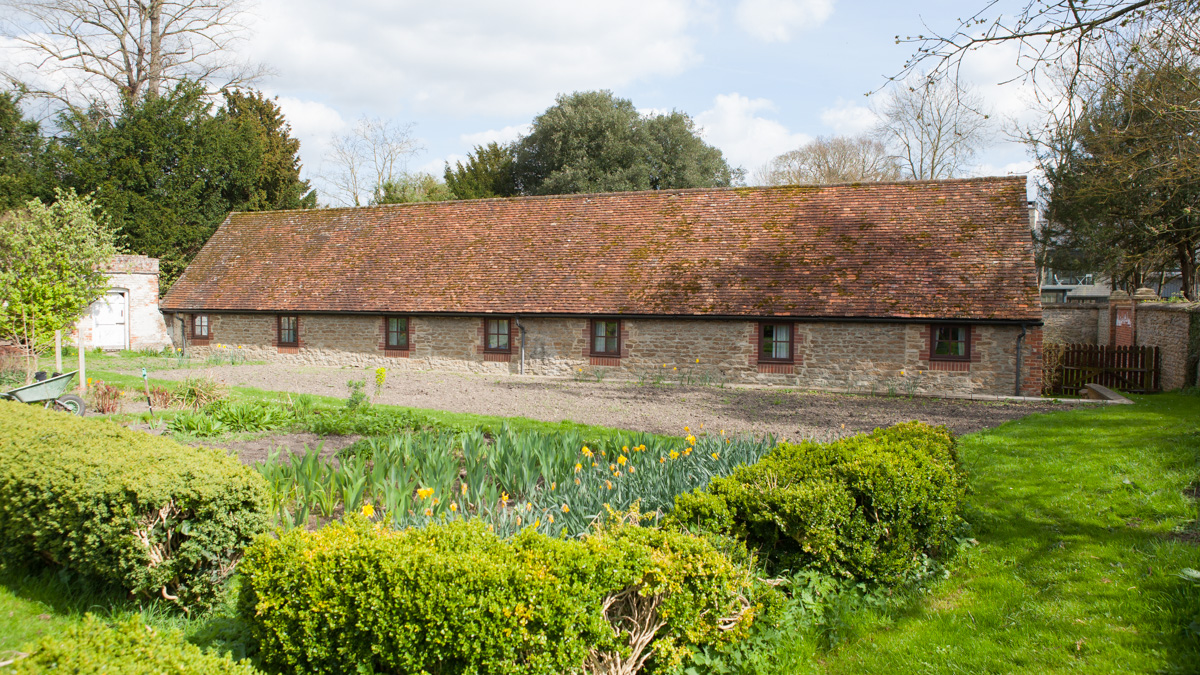
Guesthouse

The Abbey in Sutton Courtenay is a medieval courtyard house in the English county of Oxfordshire (formerly Berkshire). It is located in the Vale of White Horse near the River Thames, across the road from the twelfth-century Norman Hall and the Manor House. The Abbey has been recognised as a building of outstanding historic and architectural interest and is considered to be a 'textbook' example of an English medieval manor house. It has been a Grade I-listed building since 1952.

The Abbey has its origins in the thirteenth century as a rectory of Abingdon Abbey, a Benedictine monastery up north in Abingdon-on-Thames. Several construction phases took place during the Middle Ages, carried out by prominent figures like Solomon of Rochester, Thomas Beckington and William Say, but it was not until the seventeenth century that the current plan was completed. It was probably during the Victorian era that the house obtained the name 'The Abbey'. From 1495 to 1867, The Abbey was in possession of St George's Chapel at Windsor Castle, who leased the estate among others to John Fettiplace.

After being inhabited by Eve Fleming, the estate was bought by David Astor in 1958, who leased it to the Ockenden Venture which offered sanctuary to refugees and displaced children. In the 70s, The Abbey was lent to the exiled Bishop Colin Winter to house the Namibia International Peace Centre. In 1978, the Astor family sold the house and in 1980 it came into possession of The New Era Centre, a non-profit charity led by Fred Blum and Bishop Stephen Verney. The New Era Centre used The Abbey as a spiritual retreat and conference centre, and changed its name to The Abbey, Sutton Courtenay in the 1990s.

The Abbey, Sutton Courtenay is a "residential centre in which a spiritual community offers hospitality to people" who are seeking spiritual refreshment, personal growth and healing. The Abbey also organises public events concerning spirituality, personal development, education, music and the arts.

== Buildings ==
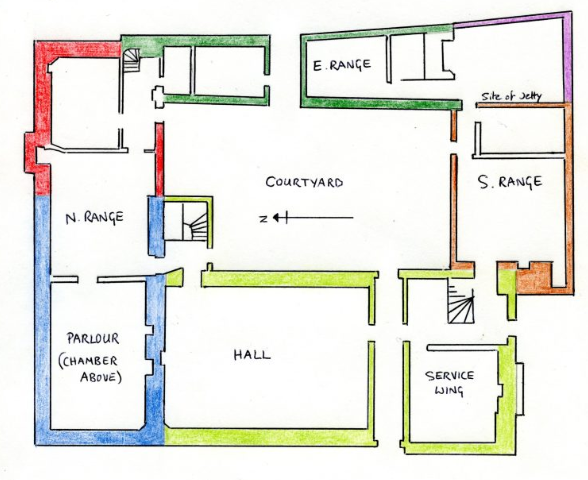
A plan of the main building (ground floor).

The Abbey forms a quadrangle with an inner courtyard. It has 28 rooms and a great hall. The two-storey building has clay roof tiles on a structure made with stone and timber. Originally, it had a thatched roof. Four ranges are arranged around the central courtyard. The oldest surviving parts of The Abbey are the north and west ranges, the frames of which were originally from wood, parts of which were later encased in stone in order to stabilise the structure.

Originally, The Abbey's main entrance to was through a rear door of the passage separating the service wing from the great hall. Nowadays, the main entrance is on the east side with a Gothic arch, a 1980s insertion replacing a narrow door, leading to the courtyard.

The earliest documentations of the site are from the nineteenth century. Edward Blore made sketches of the interior of the hall and of the house as seen from the northwest, which served as the basis of the engravings published by John Henry Parker in 1853. Parker also published a plan of the building. Peter Spencer Spokes and John M. Fletcher published a partial measure survey of the hall roof, and it was F.W.B. Charles who showed that the central truss of the hall must be base-cruck. However, most of these nineteenth-century accounts show inaccuracies.

Nowadays, there is also a guest house which is used for customers, conference guests and visitors. It is adjacent to the main house and it has its own kitchen with a dining area. In total, the guest house has nine rooms, of which five are twin rooms and four single.

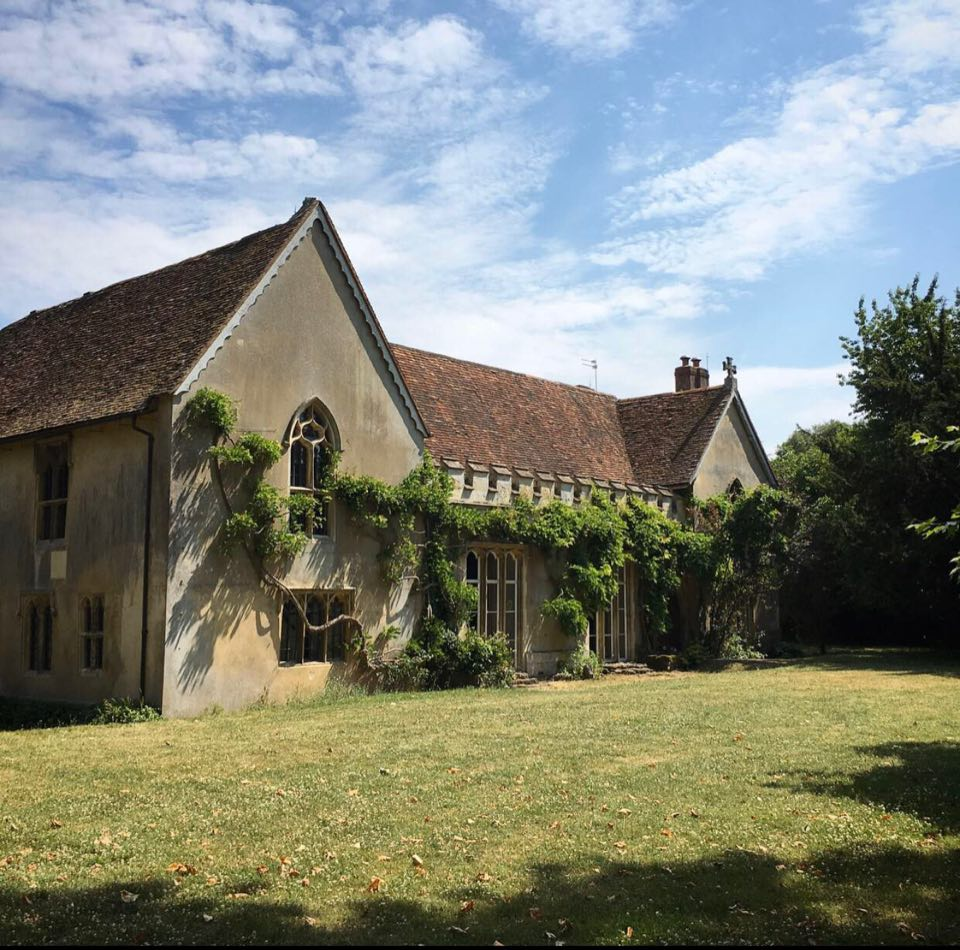
West range

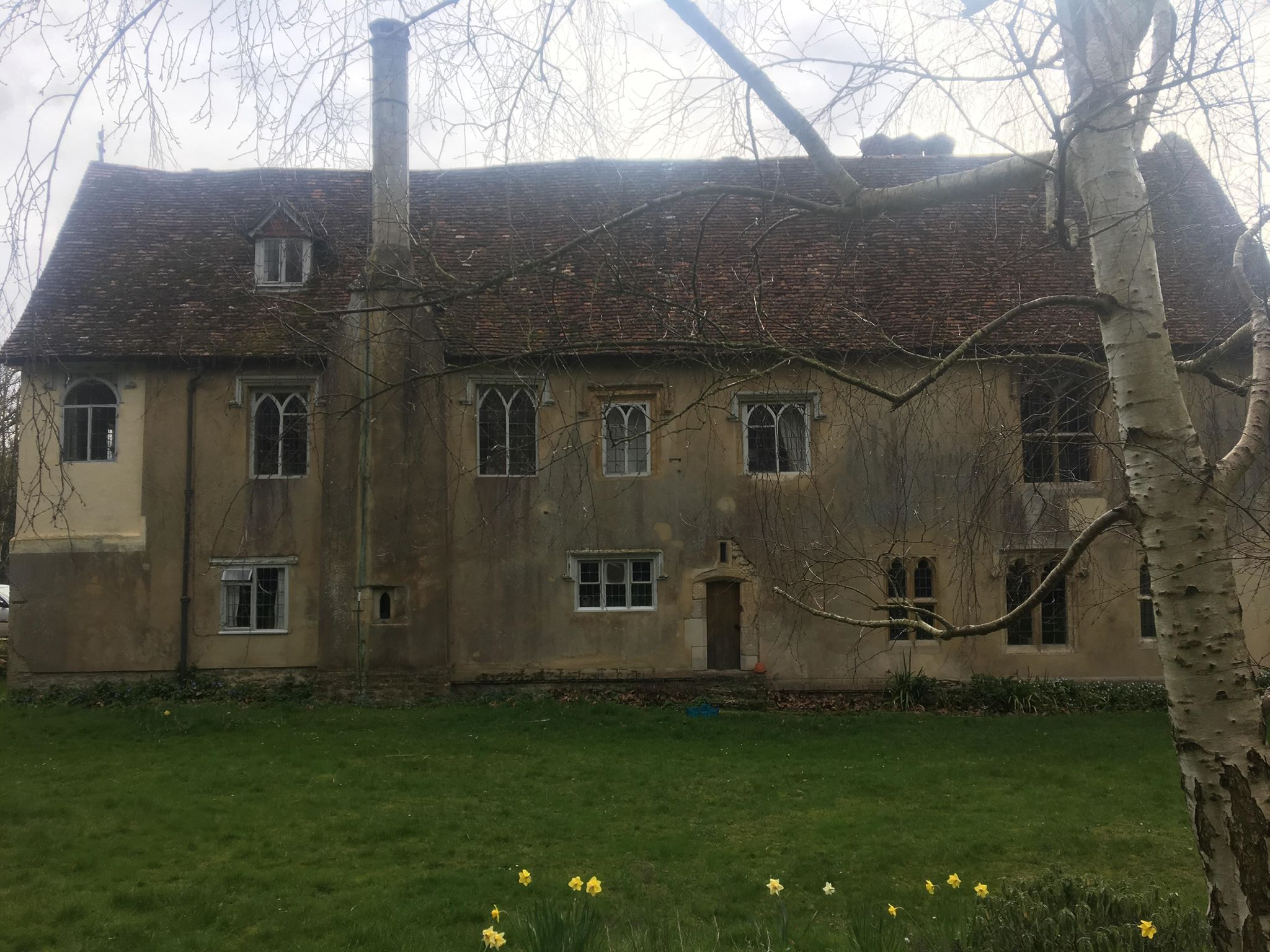
North range

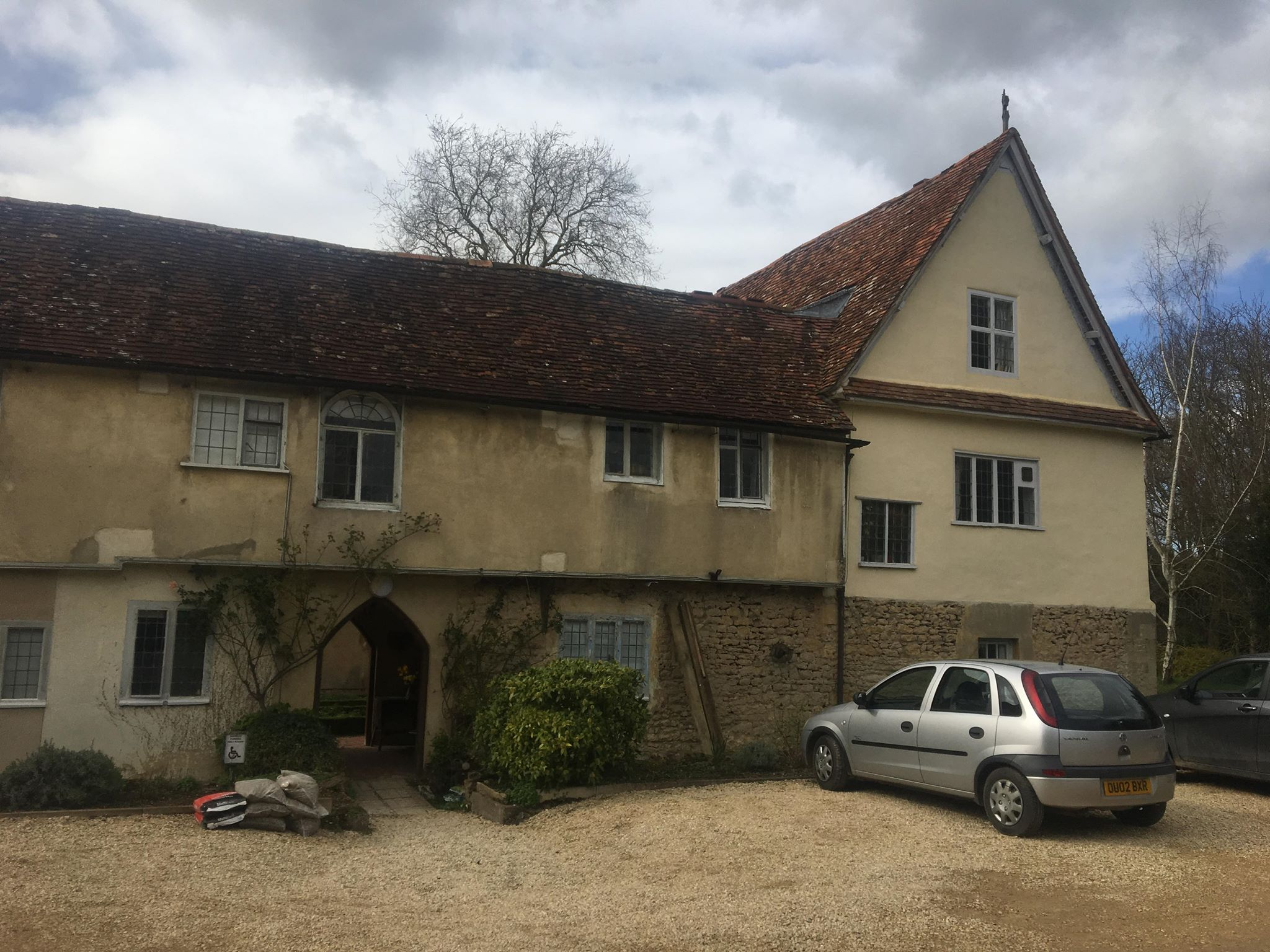
East range

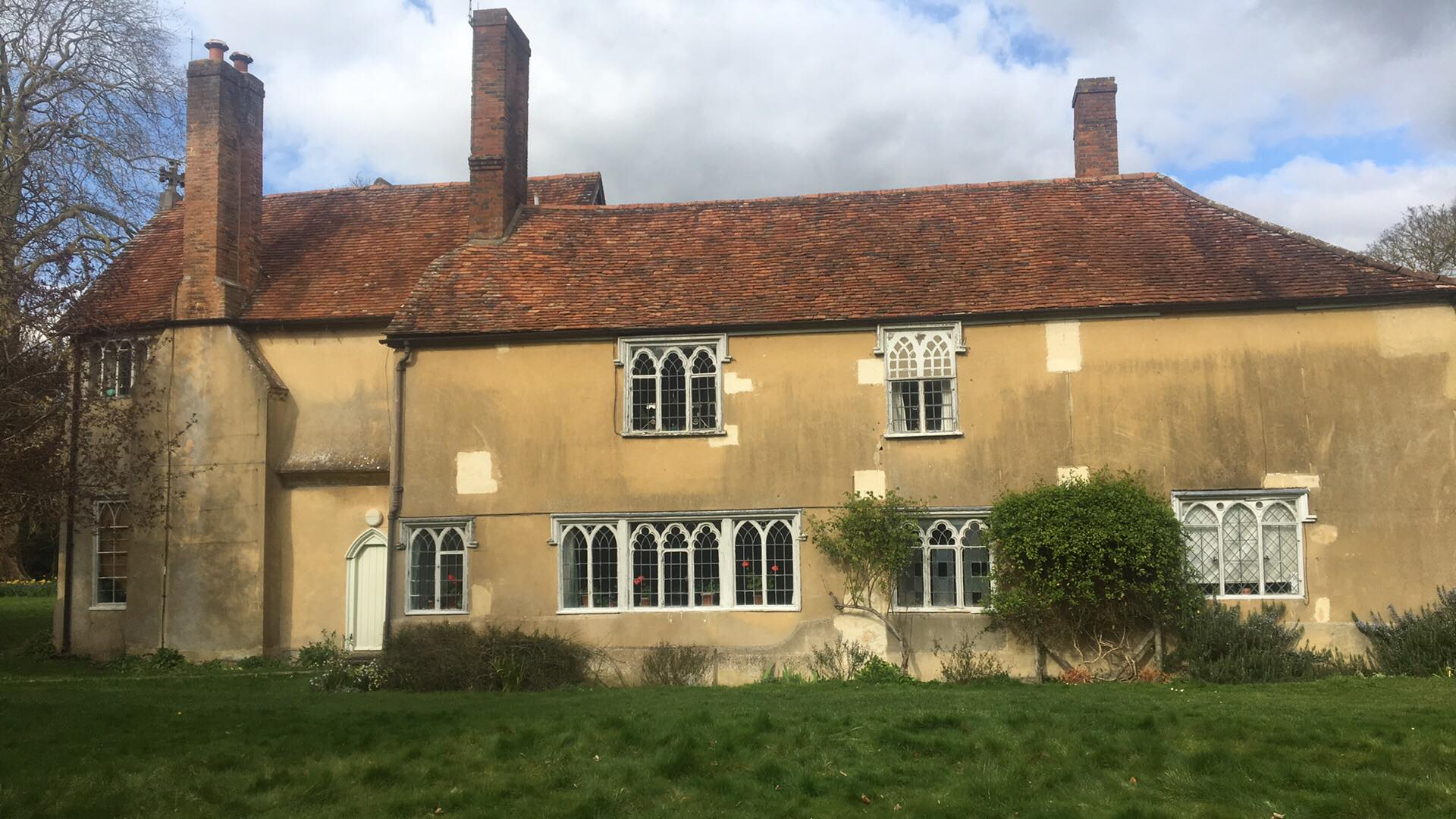
South range

=== West range ===
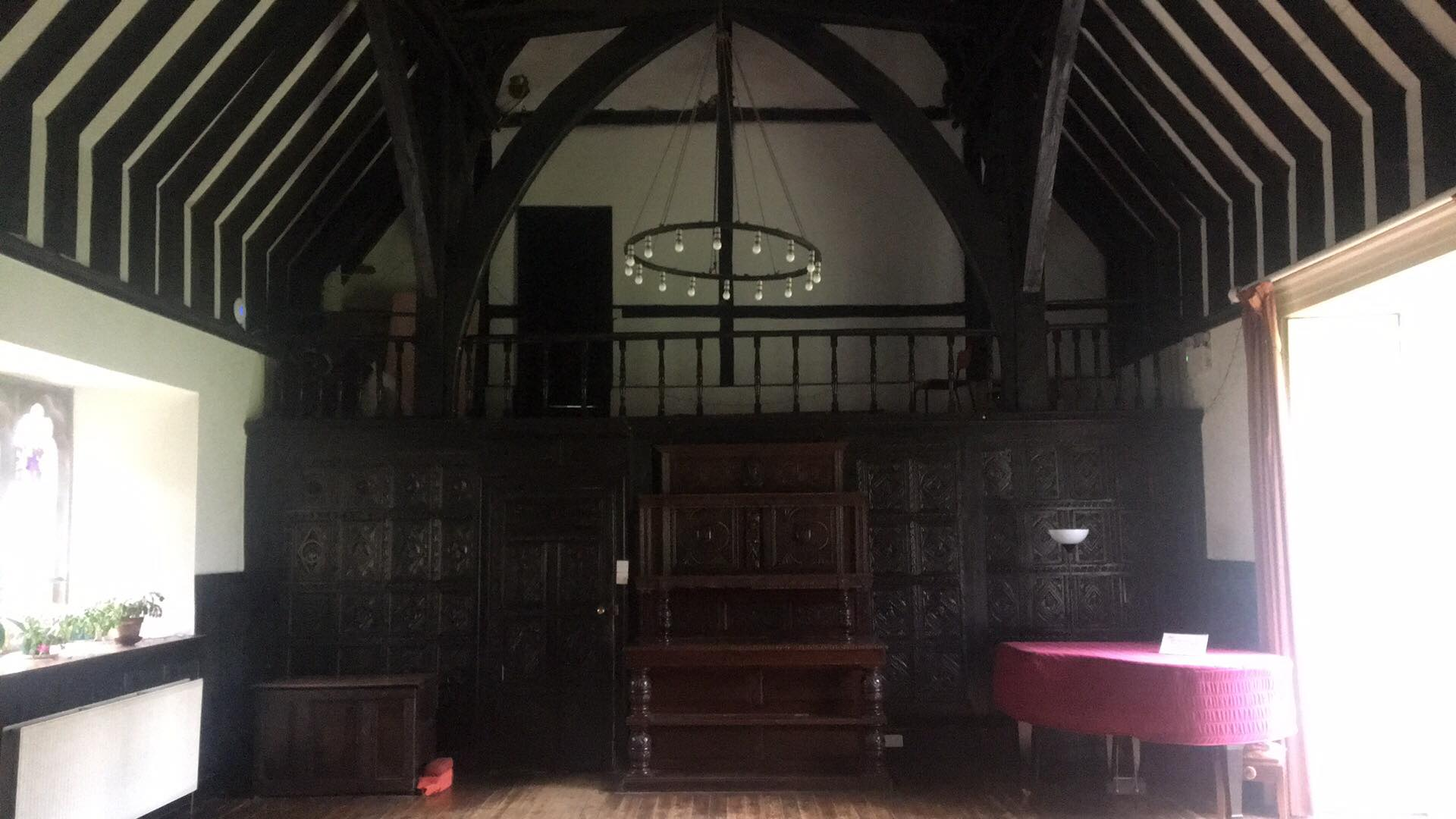
The great hall of The Abbey, facing southwards.

The service wing is located at the southwest corner of the building, the southern part of its west range, and was built in the late thirteenth century. The wing is largely timber-framed. On the ground floor in the southwest end, the wing seems to incorporate a stone wall of an earlier structure, in which lateral chimney stacks have been built with fireplaces dating from the nineteenth century. The plastered stone wall on the west side, which is of timber above the first floor, was an underbuilding for an overhang. This wall consists of large ashlar blocks suggesting that that was done between the fifteenth and seventeenth century and it had a three-light Perpendicular window. Its timber-framed north wall also supports the framework of the great hall situated north of the service wing. The south wall of the great hall and north wall of the service wing are connected on the first floor, but not on the ground floor, creating a covered passage which originally served as The Abbey's main entrance. The dormer roof between the truss of the great hall and the service wing is done in a thirteenth-century technique. The roof of the service wing itself, however, is post-medieval. Today, the service wing houses accommodation and a meditation room.

The great hall was originally timber-framed and integrated with the contemporary service wing. It was cased in stone between 1320 and 1340 to prevent deforming of the base crucks under shear stress. The hall has two equal bays and the four two-light windows have been replaced in the twentieth century by three-light Perpendicular windows. The stonework of the northeastern doorway was largely renewed in the nineteenth century. It has wave-moulded jambs, voussoirs and an ogee-scroll hood mould. The original southern doorway was less important and similar in style, but with chamfered jambs. The northern end of the east wall abuts the north range with a straight joint, while the joint of the north range with the west wall is obscured by plaster. The doorway in the east wall has been rebuilt in brick. The west wall of the hall is castellated and probably early nineteenth century. The great hall survives open to the roof, with one cruck truss carrying a king post which is unique in that a ceiling has never hidden it. The workmanship of the timber structure is of exceptional quality. The main timbers are made from very large trees carefully sawn to avoid waney edges. All four posts have been made from the same tree. The structure has nineteenth- and twentieth-century renovations. The great wall has a wooden floor and can accommodate up to sixty people seated.

=== North range ===
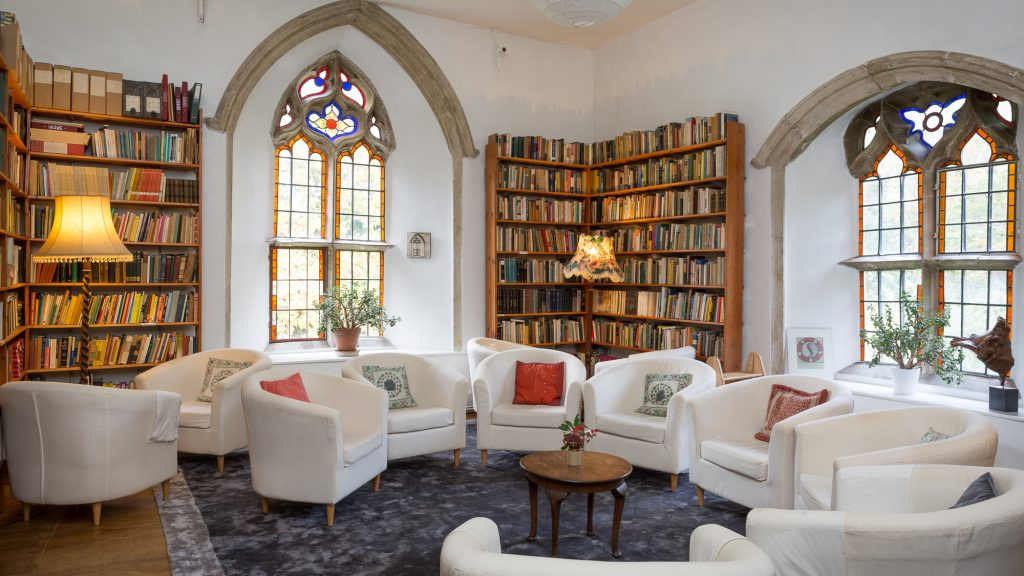
The library.

In the courtyard between the north and west range is a timber-framed staircase outshut, dating from before the stone casing of the early fourteenth century. The stair is modern and leads to a door on the first floor of the north range. The outshut roof was probably repaired in the seventeenth century with an inserted purlin.

The northern range is roofed in six bays. The western three bays were originally also built in the late thirteenth and early fourteenth centuries, while the eastern three bays of the northern range have timber work in the roof that indicates a fifteenth-century date.

The finish of the timbers of the three western bays in the north range is of inferior quality to that of the hall. On the ground floor was a parlour now used as a dining room, located under the two most western bays. The walls of this parlour vary in size. The west wall contains a three-light Perpendicular window, the north wall contains three two-light ones. The present fireplace is modern but there must have been a chimney since the fifteenth century. East of the parlour, the floor level rises and there is a cross passage. The door at the north end of the passage became blocked and was reopened only in the 1980s. East to the passage, under the third bay from the west, is a lodged floor. Originally, this bay was divided in a room to the north and a narrow room or corridor to the south. The first floor of these western three bays originally served as a great chamber, the second most important room in a medieval English manor house. This chamber was entered through a door from the staircase outshut. It is dominated by two fourteenth-century two-light transom windows in the west gable and in the north wall. The reveals of a third window also remain in the north wall. The present fireplace has musician corbels from the fifteenth century. The roof structure was similar to the open roof of the great hall until probably the seventeenth century, when the room was separated into two rooms, with a corridor on the south side of the eastern room. These rooms now serve as the library and dining room respectively.

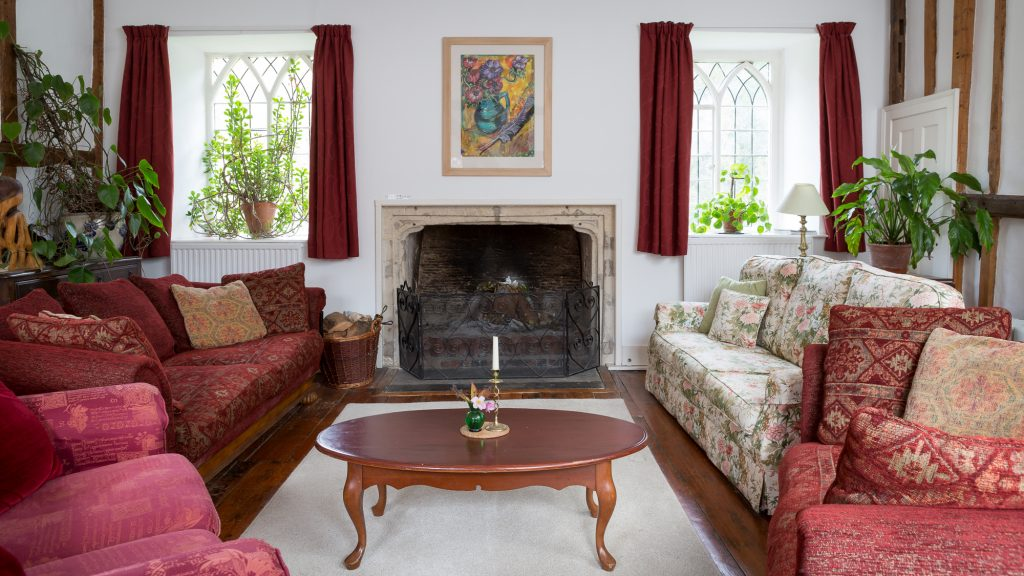
The solar.

On the ground floor of the three eastern bays, the third bay from the east was probably open to the roof and is nowadays part of the same room with the third bay from the west (the room east of the parlour). It has a small lancet window in the northern wall at the base of the chimney. The two easternmost bays formed one room and has a modern partition from a corridor to the south. The north and east walls are both from stone, and at the east end of the northern wall is a blocked window. The other two windows are modern. An overhang projected northwards to the room. The present timber south wall replaced a stone wall, remains of which were found during plumbing operations in 1987–8. On the first floor there was a solar in the second and third bay from the east which was to the west divided from the dining room by a timber-framed partition. On the north side, there are two nineteenth- or twentieth-century Gothic windows flanking a large chimney with a fireplace. There may have been a partition in the middle of the room before the fireplace was built. The solar has a partition to the east behind which was a chapel and a door from the north to the east range.

=== East range ===
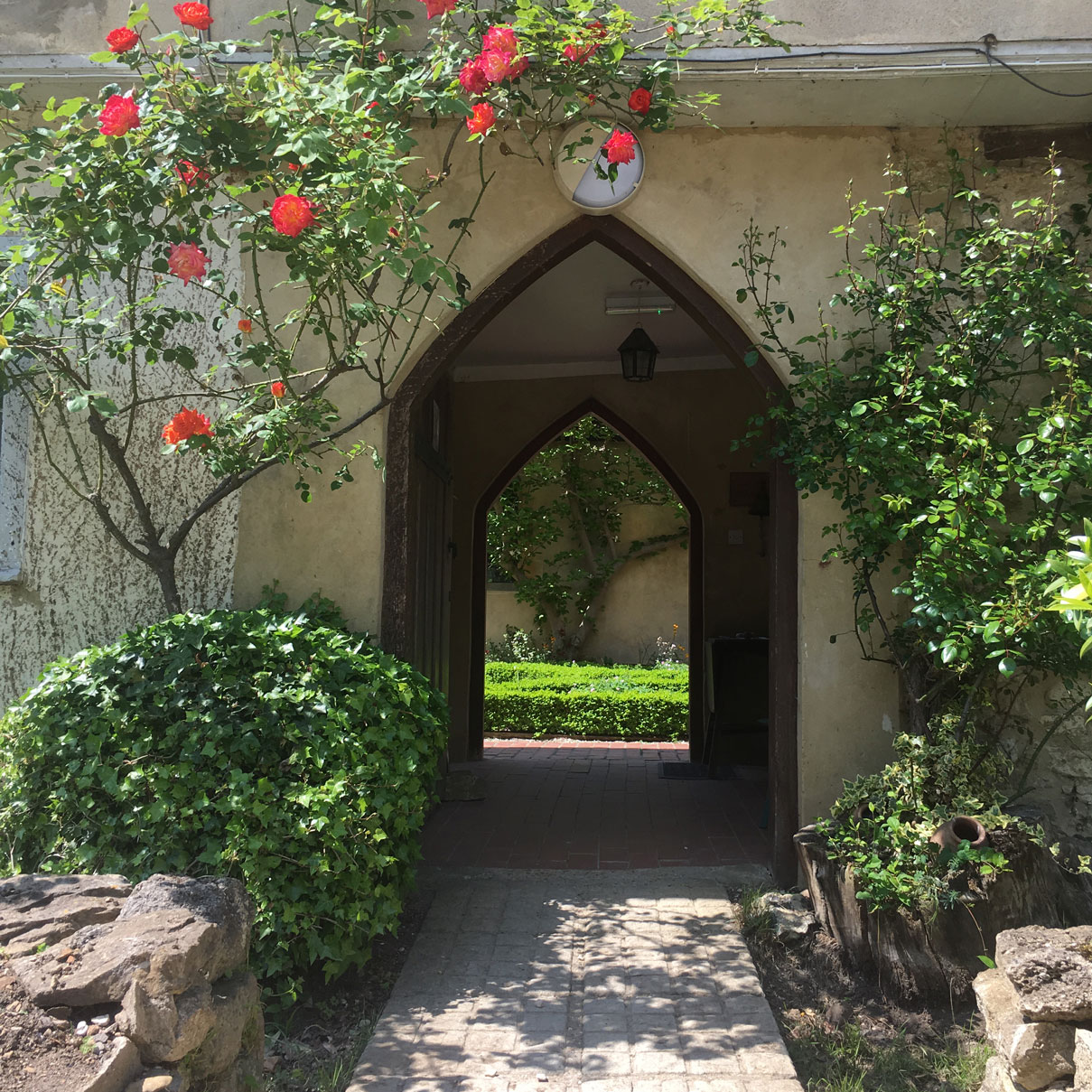
East entrance looking into the courtyard.

Today, the east range holds the entrance archway. It was constructed around 1500 and contains three bays. The modern gatehouse, at the northern end of the east range, has a lancet window in its east wall. It has a jettied wooden frame upper part standing on stone walls.

South of the archway, the wall was timber framed but later partially infilled with brick and rubble as far as the chimney, where it joins the south range. This timber framed wall is on a different alignment than the gatehouse, probably to unite with the south wall of the southeastern block, which originally may have been part of a wall around the courtyard before being incorporated into the building.

The roof of the southern bay of the east range was black-smokened and may have served as a kitchen or brewhouse at some time into which a chimney was later inserted.

=== South range ===
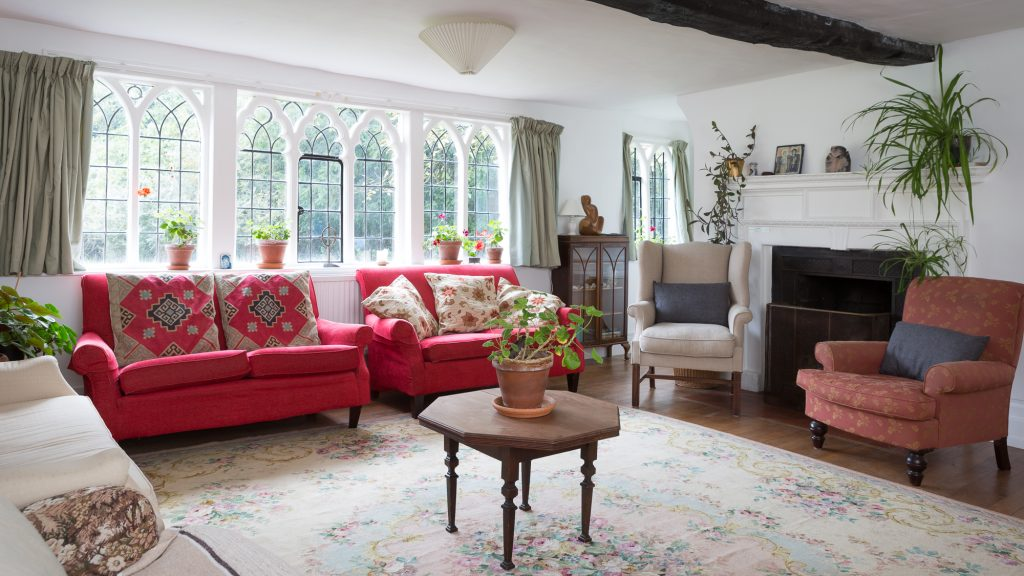
The Hearth, a meeting room in the south range.

The western part of the south range extends the service wing and was added during the mid-sixteenth century. The two storey structure was open to the eaves and was once used for the kitchen.

The adjoining southeast corner block appears to have been roofed, probably in the seventeenth century, to connect the east range with the south range. The construction of this block completed the courtyard plan.

Nowadays, the south range serves as the administration office of The Abbey. The southeast corner block contains a meeting room called 'The Hearth', seating up to eighteen people.

== Grounds ==
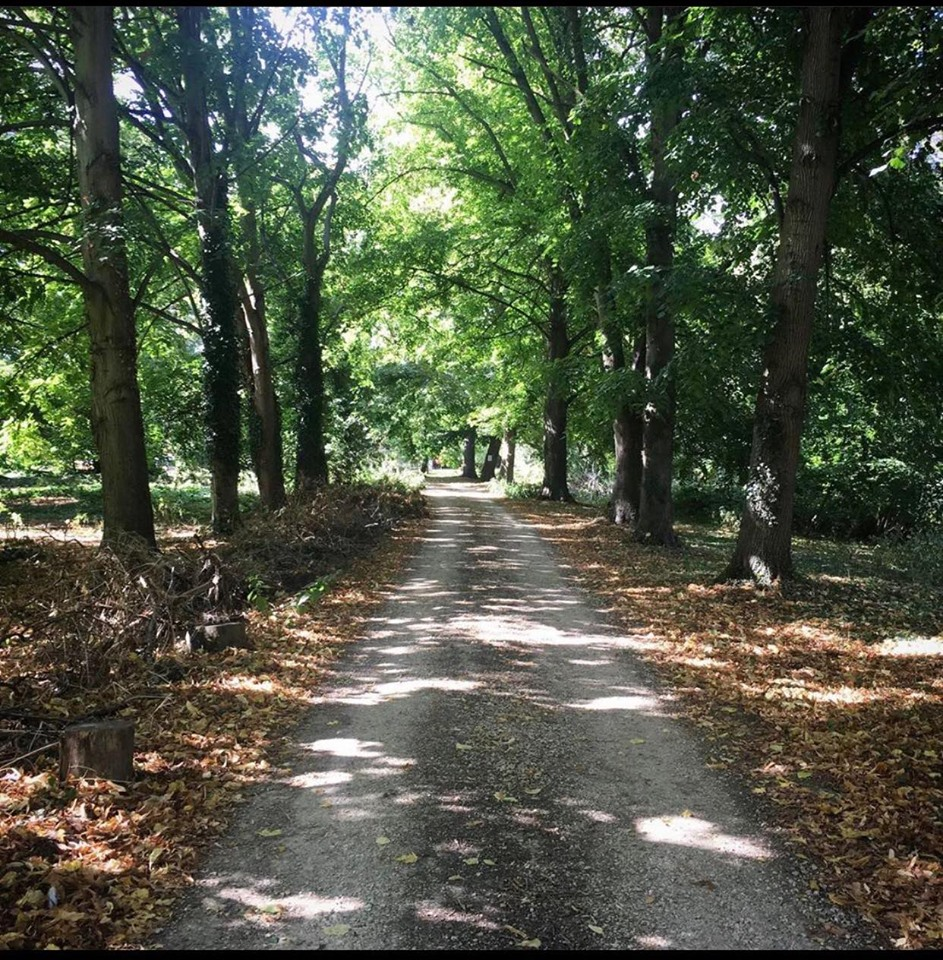
The lime tree avenue.

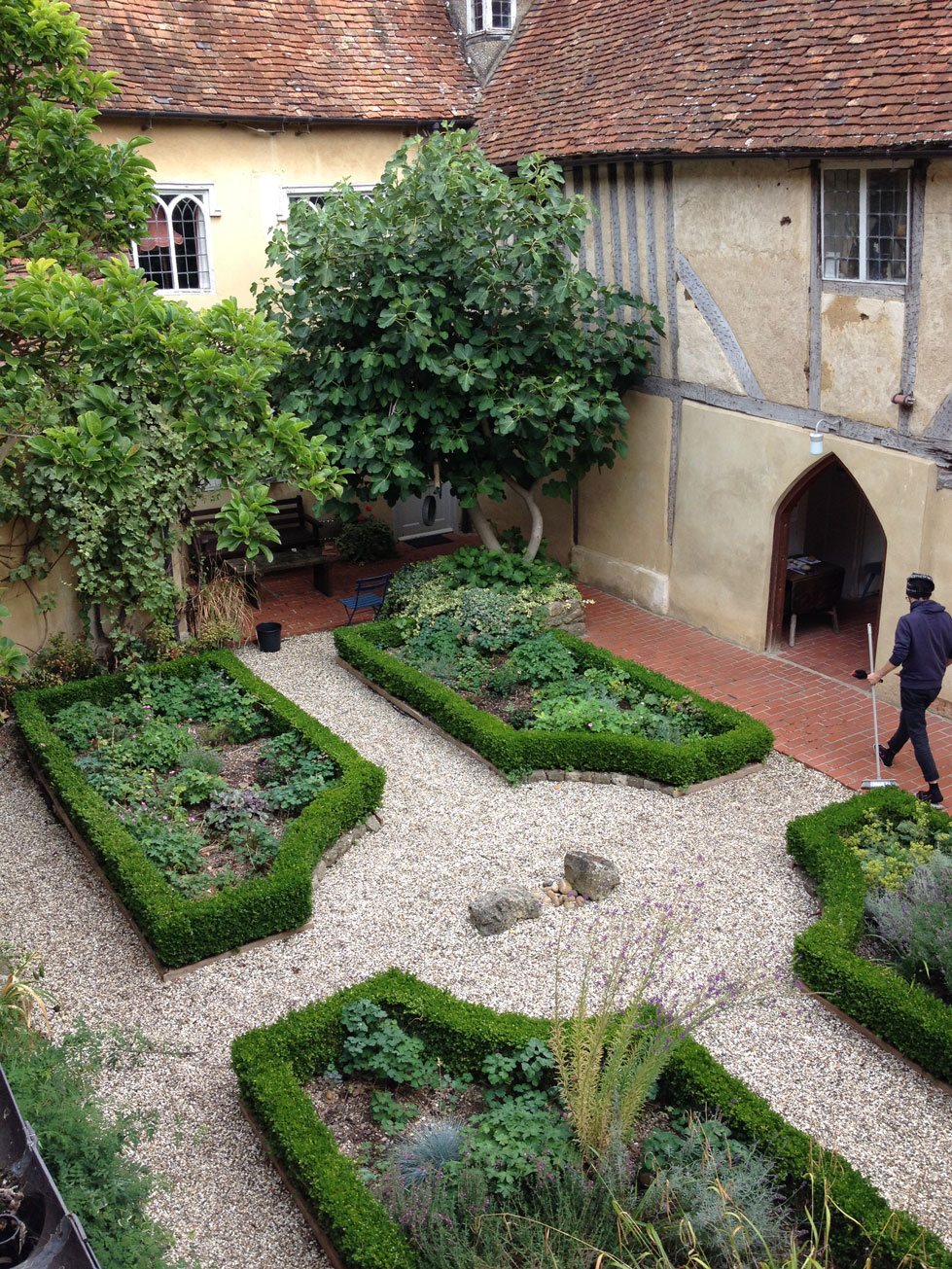
The courtyard garden.

In 1804, Francis Justice, who was in possession of the estate at the time, was allotted over two acres on the green north of the house. As a result of this enlargement of the curtilage, The Abbey now stands in the midst of extensive grounds and is approached by a lime tree avenue across the enclosure allotment, leading near to the east of the house. Although the avenue across the grounds appears to have existed before the enclosure (some trees are older than 1804) the house stood on the eastern edge of its curtilage until 1798. The old boundary wall survives, only circa two meters beyond the east wall of the house. The perimeter is indicated by old stone walls, wooden fencing and dead hedging.

Some four and a half acres of the land are used as gardens. On the north lawn, there is a plane tree surrounded by daffodils. Here grow ash, beech, bramble, various conifers, field maple, ivy, oak, rhododendrons and sycamore trees. There are also laurels, winter-flowering Viburnum, snowberry, a young Japanese cherry and maple. A trunk and several branches from an old copper beech serve as a place for fungi and lichens to grow on. Under the trees, there is a purpose built wood store. On the west lawn, there is a London plane. The south lawn has a labyrinth in it, where the maypole is erected. This lawn has young redwood and several varieties of apple and plum trees. Furthermore, The Abbey has mature holm oak, yew, wild cherry, bird cherry, mulberry and a cedar of Lebanon. In 1991, a project was completed which took care of the trees and transplanted various species around the grounds. Adjacent to the grounds, there is a small secluded orchard where honey is produced from The Abbey's own mason and honey bees. The guest house area contains apple, elder, ivy, spindle, wayfarer and yew alongside plants like climbing roses, ferns and sage.

The courtyard garden has a fig tree, Magnolia, roses and a medieval style flower bed surrounded by a mature Buxus hedging. This garden was restored during the 1990s with gravelled paths and redesigned by B. Vellacot, a local volunteer. Around the main building there are flower beds with plants such as catnip, curry plants, Fuchsia, lavender, periwinkle, rosemary, sage, Siberian bugloss, spirea and winter jasmine. Near the kitchen, there is a herb bed underneath a silver birch. The walled kitchen garden has a wildflower meadow, a cut flower bed, a bed with strawberries and trees including damson, fig, greengage, morello cherry, olive, pear, plum and quince. Vegetables grown in the kitchen garden are artichoke, carrot, chard, courgette, kale, leek, maize, marrow, potato and pumpkin, which are used for consumption. There is also a greenhouse where The Abbey grows winter rocket, parsley and coriander among others. The walls are flanked by shrubs including Buddleja, dogwoods, musk mallows, elder and mock-orange.

The grounds have resident muntjacs and common wild animals include hedgehogs, grey squirrels, foxes, shrews, voles and woodmice, besides many insect and bird species. The Abbey has also had sighting of the common pipistrelle, the serotine bat and the rugged oil beetle (a rare Meloe species).

Grounds of The Abbey

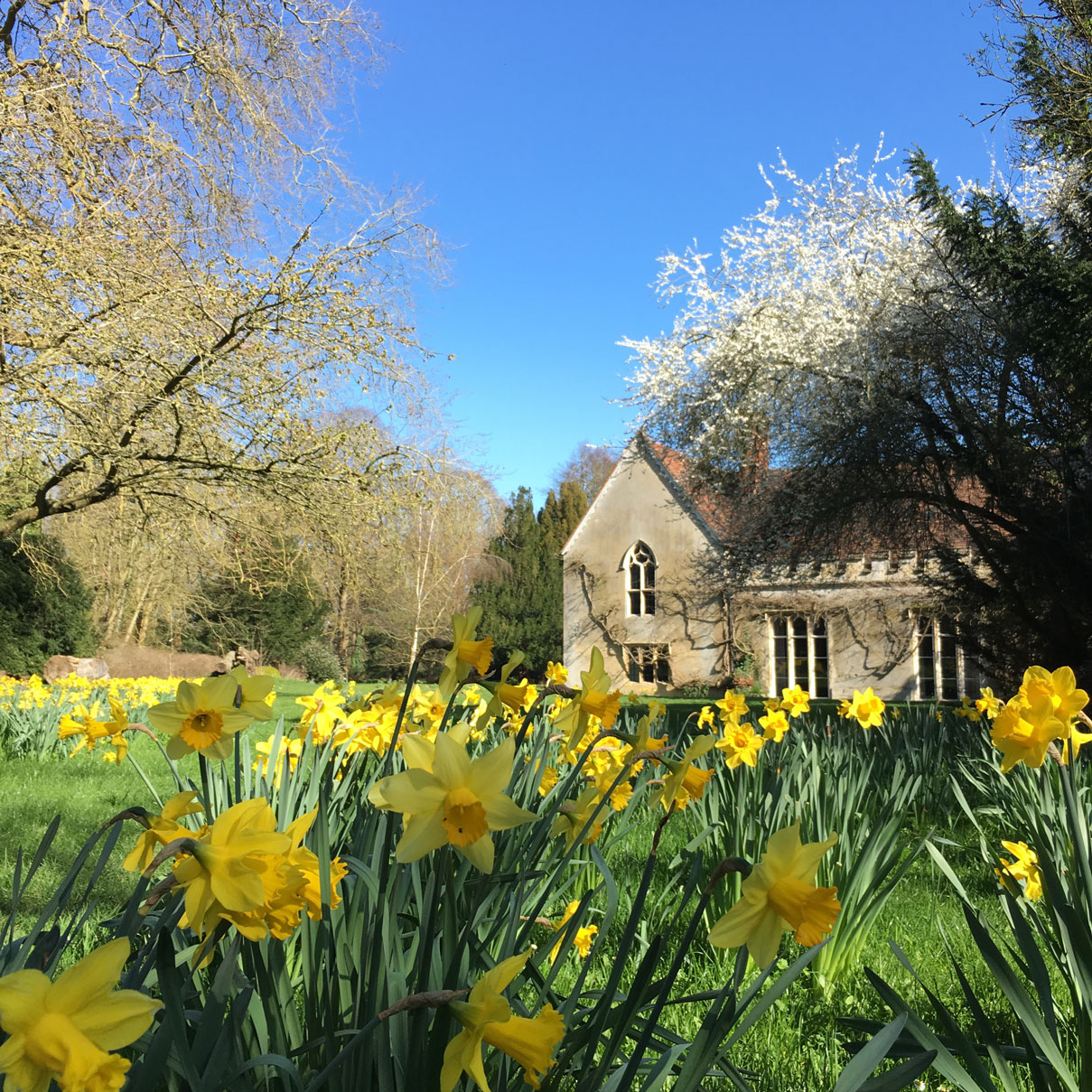

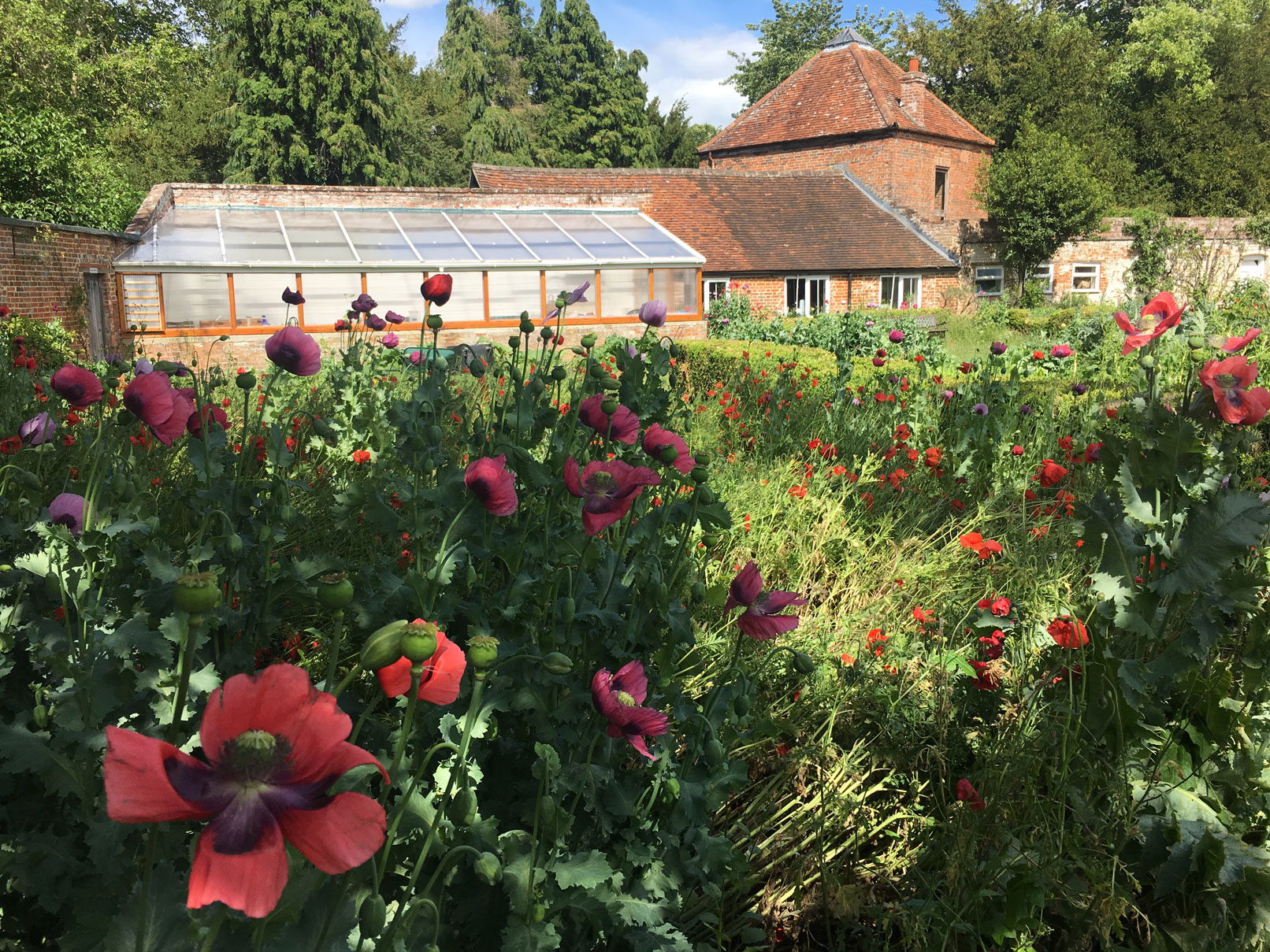

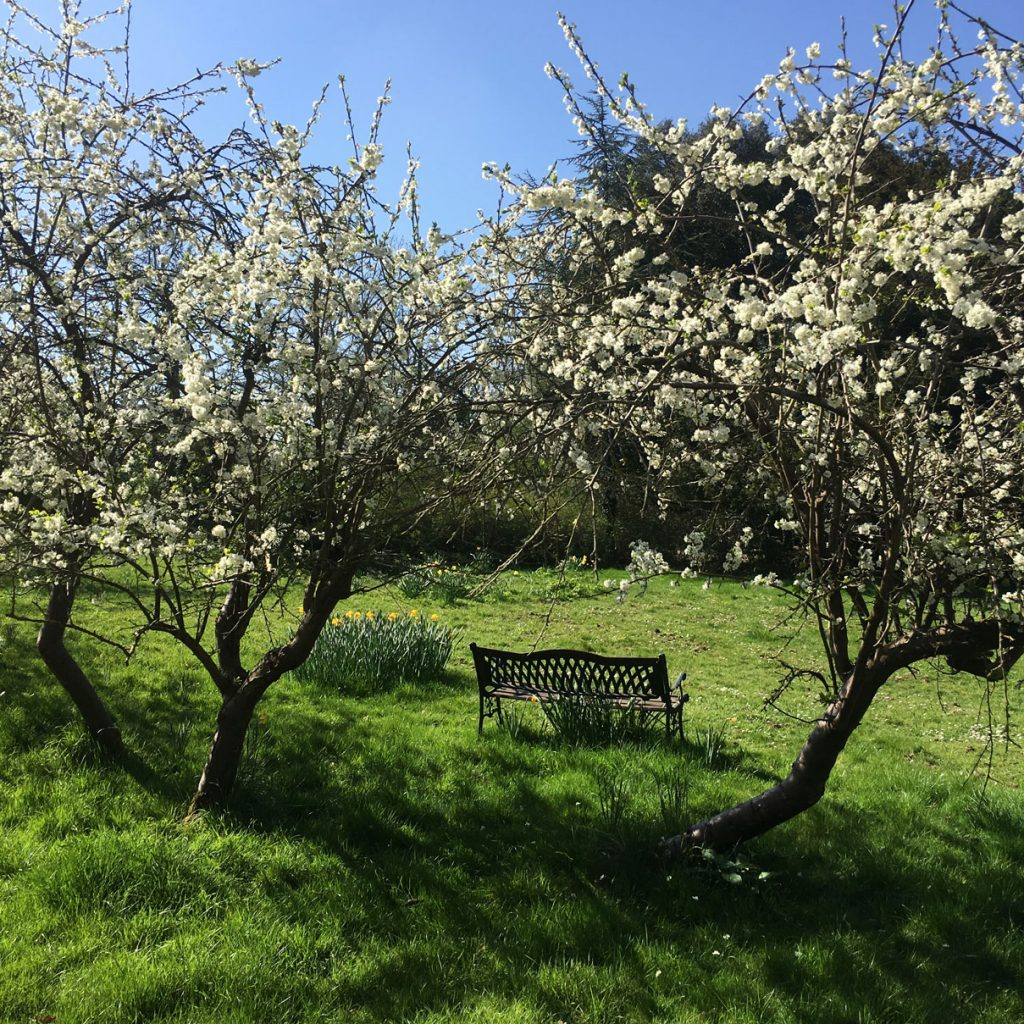

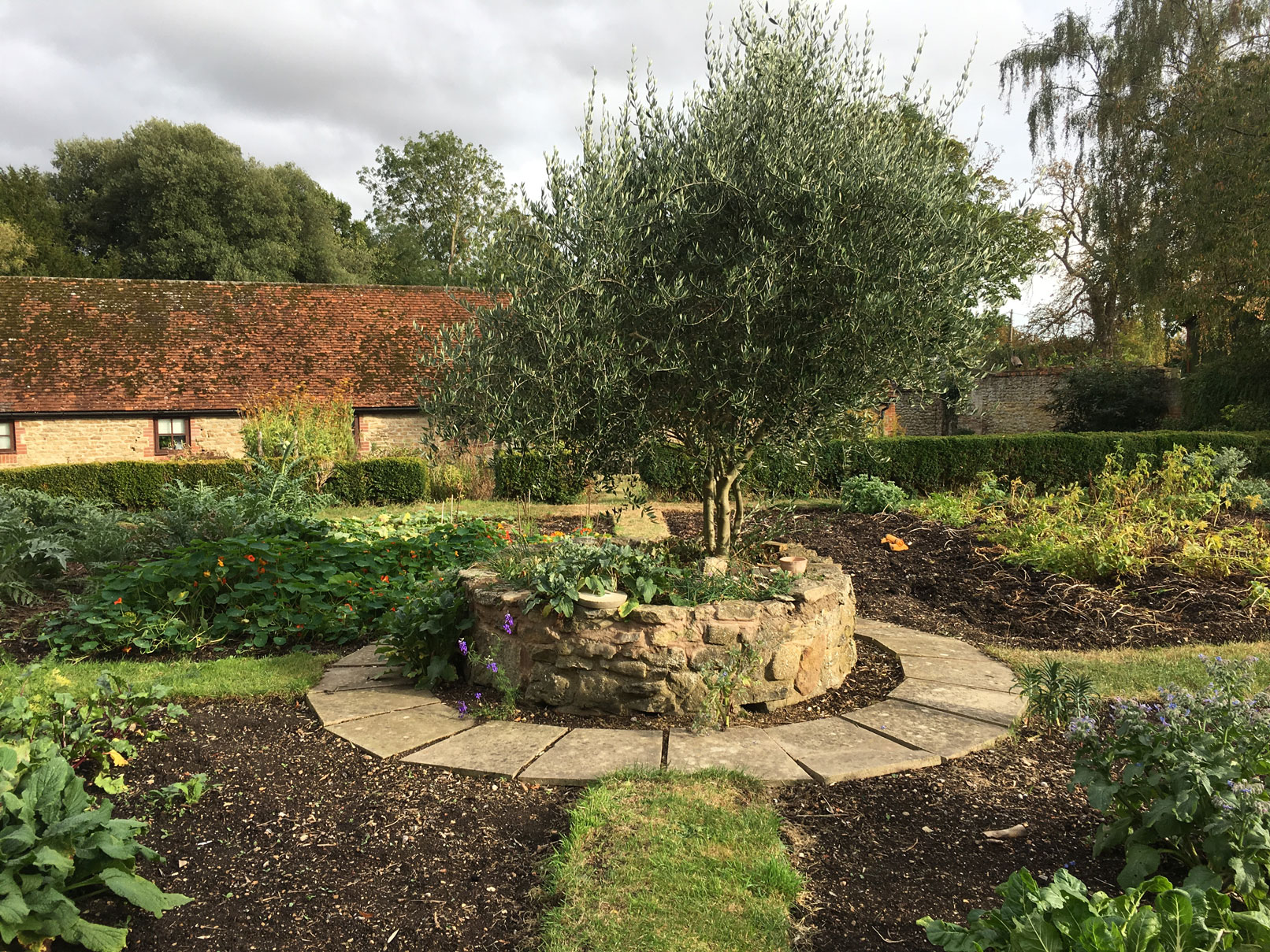

== History ==
=== Middle Ages ===
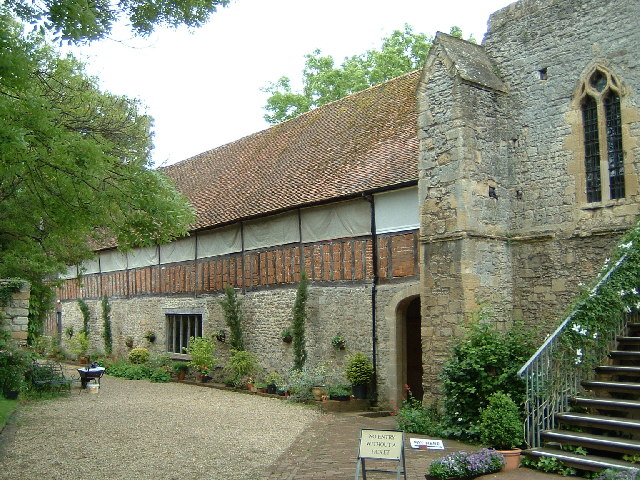
Abingdon Abbey started the construction of The Abbey.

In the seventh century, Sutton was gifted by King Ine of Wessex to Abingdon Abbey, a Benedictine monastery which had a strong local influence and extensive property in this area at the time, supposedly founded in 675. In the eleventh century, William the Conqueror granted the estate of Sutton to the House of Courtenay, and the village became Sutton Courtenay. In 1090, King William II of England granted the church of Sutton and its lands and tithes to the monks of Abingdon Abbey.

Abingdon Abbey constructed The Abbey as a monastic grange, used as an administrative centre for the abbey's land and tithe holdings. However, the owner of the hide of land, Alwi the priest (whose father owned the land before him according to the Domesday Book), agreed with the abbot that he should retain Sutton with reversion first to his son and thereafter to the abbey, on condition of giving in Milton chapelry immediately. Almost certainly in the late twelfth century, Abingdon Abbey took two thirds of the tithes and the rector the remaining third. In 1258, following a dispute, the land was formally appropriated to the abbey and a vicarage was ordained. As it was close to Abingdon Abbey, it was probably run by the monks themselves rather than being left to a steward. In 1278, however, Hugh de Courtenay, Lord of the Manor of Sutton, sued the abbey for advowson. An allegedly biased jury was impaneled and in 1284 it found unexpectedly for Courtenay. Solomon of Rochester, the chief justice of the eyre, who presided over the jury, was the first to be patronised by the Courtenays. The abbot of Abingdon Abbey alleged that in 1290, Solomon of Rochester had seized goods in it belonging to Abingdon Abbey. He also claimed that Solomon had extorted 40 marks from the abbey for alleged dilapidations to the rectory house. He was not convicted of any offence.

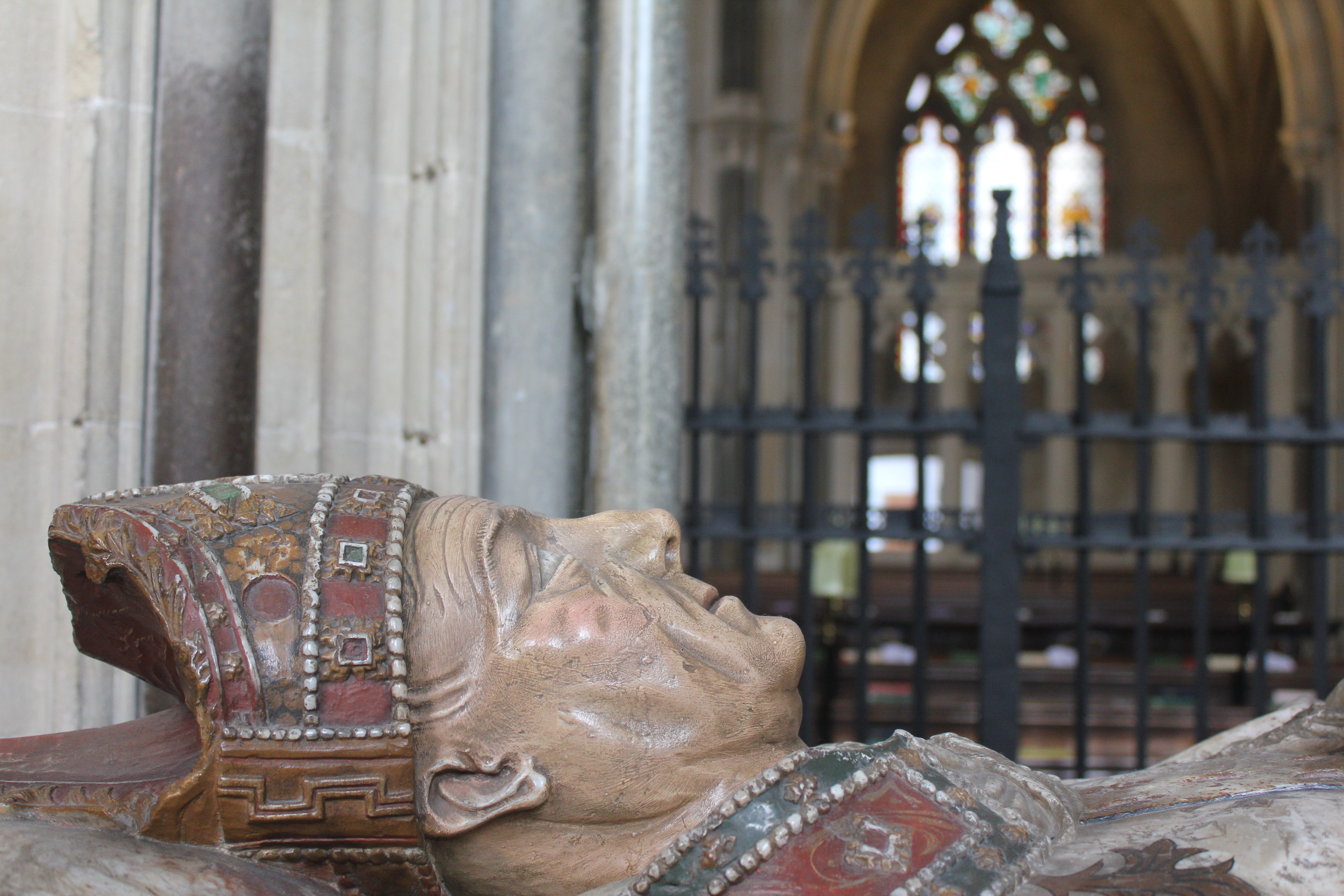
Thomas Beckington stayed at The Abbey in 1442.

It is not clear how many of Solomon's successors actually used the house as a residence. Many of these men rarely visited Sutton, leaving the running of The Abbey to various underlings. William Steele, rector in 1371, left money to each of his four servants in Sutton. Robert of Walsham, rector from 1372 to 1384 and Dean of Wallingford, may have resided intermittently. His successor John Yernemouth was rector from 1384 to 1397 and did not reside but hired a chaplain to perform his duties. John Yernemouth was the chaplain of Prince John of Gaunt, son of King Edward III of England. He left the rectory to William Brouns, father of Bishop Thomas Brouns, and two others sometime before 1394. By then, the building had become ruinous and badly roofed. Walter Medford, later Archdeacon of Berkshire, was rector from 1397 to 1413 and may well have used the house. His successor, Nicholas Colnet, also may have resided at the rectory. Colnet was the doctor of King Henry V of England and was rector until 1420. He left money to the church and poor of Sutton. Thomas Beckington, rector since 1420 and secretary of King Henry VI of England, stayed at Sutton twice in 1442 and perhaps on other occasions. The ceiling of the solar is attributed to Beckington. In 1442, he was accompanied by William Say, who succeeded him as rector when Beckington became Bishop of Bath and Wells in 1443. In 1444, Say obtained license to celebrate Divine Office in the house. The chapel was presumably new, and not used for long, since no other license is recorded.

The south and east ranges at The Abbey were completed around the middle of the fifteenth century, just before Thomas Courtenay, 6th/14th Earl of Devon, who was involved in the Wars of the Roses, was beheaded in 1461 and had his lands confiscated. Reginald Nutt, lessee in 1472 and chaplain of Sutton, was obliged to repair all thatched roofs and mud walls on the site, the repair of tiled and slated roofs and the provision of timber being the rector's responsibility.

Some works survive from the period of Abingdon Abbey's control of the rectory before 1284. Since 1284 there are three medieval phases that can be closely dated. The first one can be attributed to Solomon of Rochester between 1284 and 1290. The second phase was between ca. 1320 and 1340, when among others the casing of the hall in stone was done. The third phase was around 1444, when William Say constructed the chapel screen and a door from the north to the east range on the first floor.

=== College of St George ===
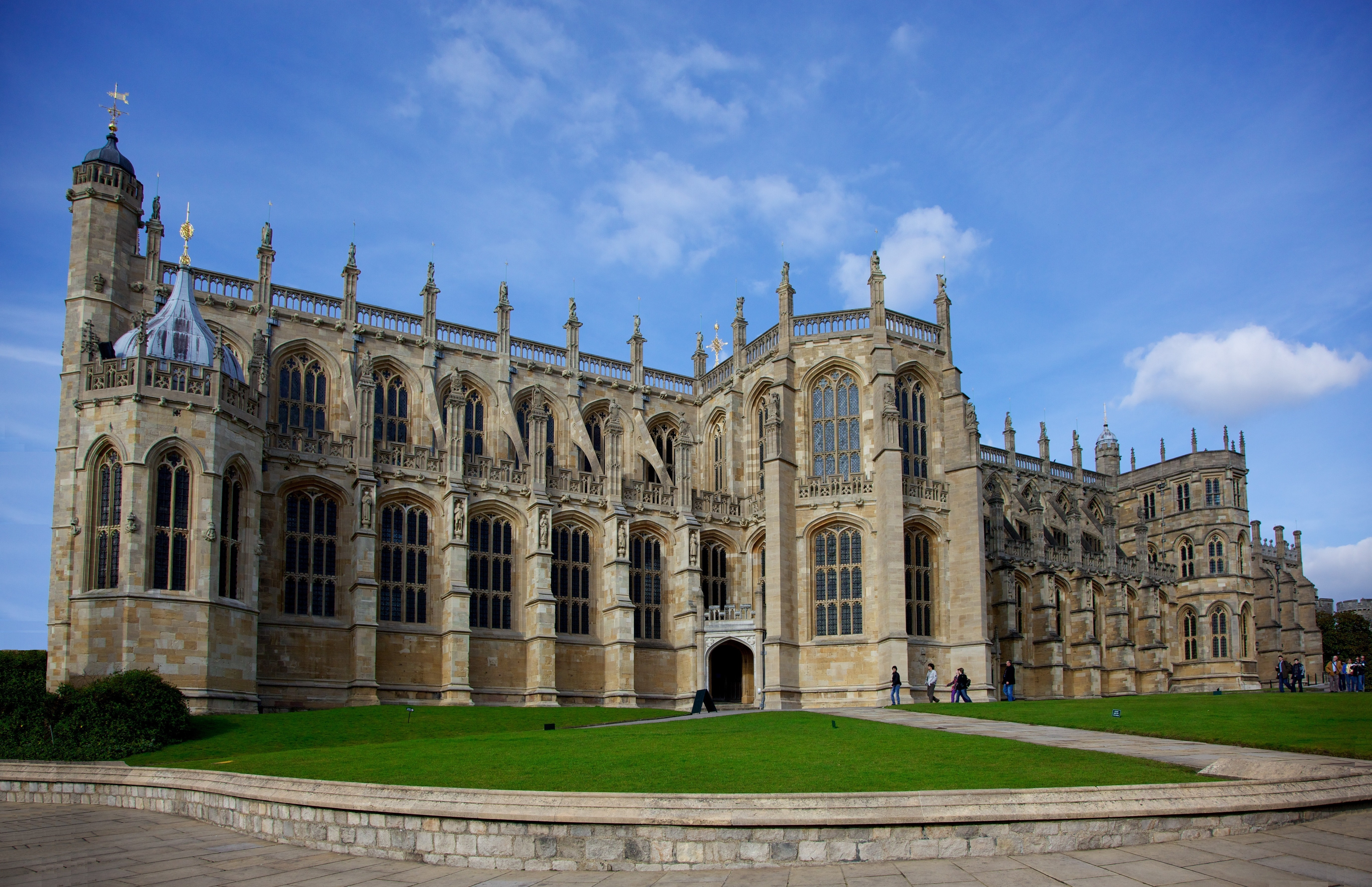
St George's Chapel, Windsor Castle was in possession of The Abbey for over 350 years.

In 1481, Walter Devereux, 8th Baron Ferrers of Chartley, granted the advowson to St George's Chapel, Windsor Castle, and in 1485, the rectory was appropriated by King Henry VII of England who transferred the house and its income to the Dean and Chapter of St George's Chapel in 1495. A second vicarage was ordained in 1496 and in 1497–8, the College of St George paid for repairs to the stable, barns and dovehouse. The Abbey was then leased to local squires by the College of St George for the next 350 years.

Some lessees during this period include Richard Wyntersell (1514), John Hyde (1538), Thomas Sackford (1562) and John Fettiplace of Besils-Leigh (1564). Thomas Sackford's lease required him to entertain the College of St George's steward at the mansion house twice a year for two days and two nights, a provision that was still included in eighteenth-century leases.

In 1589, the College of St George was contemplating legal action against Richard Hyde, son of the late lessee John Hyde, for failing to keep the house in repair.

From 1611 to 1631 the lease was held by the Thomas Windsor, 6th Baron Windsor. In 1634 the buildings included 'a very ancient parsonage house', three barns, a woolhouse, a sheephouse, a stable and a cowhouse. From 1669 onwards, the lease was held by the Justices of Sutton. In the late eighteenth century, the Justices began to extend the original leasehold curtilage by buying the freehold of adjoining tenements. Thomas Justice bought houses flanking the road on the west in 1773 and 1785. His son Francis bought a row of three cottages immediately east of the rectory plot in 1798, 1810 and later.

=== Modern period ===
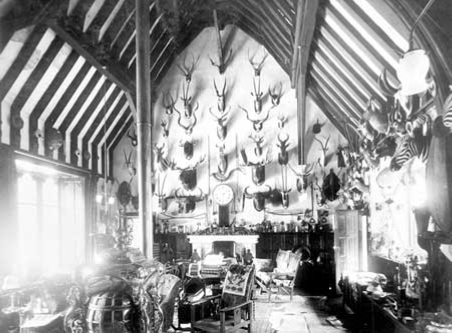
The great hall in 1906, by Henry Taunt.

In 1863 the lease was renewed by Theobald Theobald. The rectory estate passed to the Ecclesiastical Commissioners under an order in council in 1867. But in 1877 Theobald bought the freehold. When Theobald died in 1884, his widow lived in the house until her nephew Colonel Henry Norton B. Good became the owner in 1902. Colonel Good was a member of the Royal Fusiliers and served in the Second Boer War. He decorated the great hall with hunting trophies. He died in 1929 and his widow auctioned the seven acre estate. Dorothy Elizabeth Pike became the owner and sold it in 1932 to Rev. George Berens-Dowdeswell, great-grandson of William Dowdeswell, and Mrs. Eveline Mary Berens-Dowdeswell (née Hunter), who sold their estate on Severn Ham, Tewkesbury. In 1941, Eve Fleming moved in. She was the mother of Peter and James Bond-creator Ian Fleming by her first husband, and lived here until 1958.

==== David Astor ====
The estate was bought in 1958 by David Astor (son of Nancy Astor, Viscountess Astor), owner of the local Manor House since 1945 and publisher of The Observer (1948–1975). From late 1960 until 1970, the Astor family leased The Abbey for a peppercorn rent to the Ockenden Venture. The Ockenden Venture, now Ockenden International, is an English development non-governmental organisation established in 1951 that helps displaced persons become self-sufficient. The Abbey was used as a refugee children's home. The room which now serves as the dining room was used as a class room for the Ockenden students. The solar was a dormitory for girls while the boys stayed in the room now housing the library. Joan and Dane Leadlay were the first Ockenden houseparents of The Abbey. Initially, The Abbey housed refugee girls from Poland, followed by students from Romania, South Africa and Tibet. Margaret Dixon took over the running of The Abbey in 1966, bringing with her some of the older Donington boys.

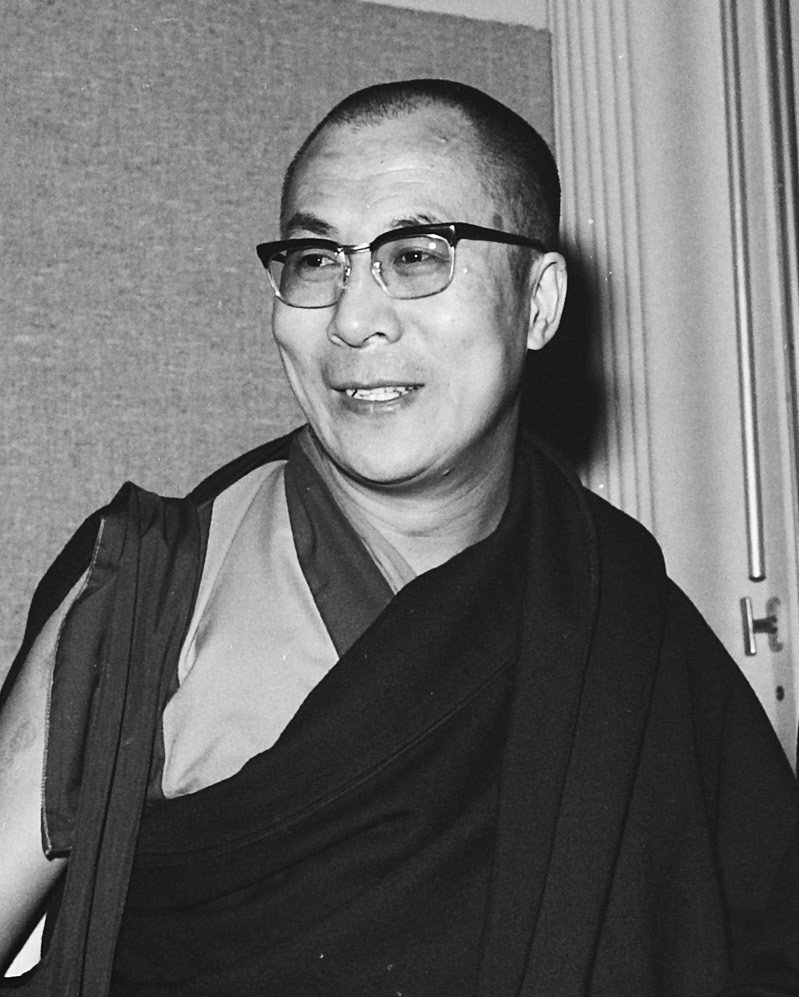
The 14th Dalai Lama visited The Abbey in 1973.

In October 1973, the 14th Dalai Lama, Tenzin Gyatso, visited The Abbey as part of his first trip to the West. He held a reception in the great hall for fellow Tibetans who since the 1960s had fled to the United Kingdom after the Chinese invasion of Tibet. The Buddhist leader wanted to meet people who were "thinking deeply about the problems of mankind". He urged British Buddhists to "develop compassion".

In 1974 it was lent, by David Astor, to the exiled Colin Winter, who was the Anglican Bishop of Damaraland, now the Diocese of Namibia. The Abbey was then used to house the Namibia International Peace Centre. In 1972, Winter was deported after opposing South Africa's policy of apartheid but remained 'bishop-in-exile'. In England, he continued to advocate for Namibian independence and he was known for his anti-establishment remarks, such as his criticism on Margaret Thatcher in 1978.

Astor visited Sutton Courtenay frequently, and regarded it with a great deal of affection. Visitors over the years included Winston Churchill, Evelyn Waugh, Lady Mary Lygon, Chips Channon and Lady Diana Cooper, who described the village as "the place above all others for romance and gathering rosebuds and making hay and jumping over the moon," and noted how "flowers literally overflowed everything and drifted off in to a wilderness". Astor, after a trip to Jura, helped a local family, the Mackenzies, relocate to Sutton Courtenay, knowing that Highland life was not kind to the family. Later members of the Mackenzie family continue to live in the village today.

In 1975 Astor resigned as editor but continued to support a number of charities and to finance pressure groups for causes that he strongly believed in, such as the Koestler Trust, a charity helping ex-offenders express themselves creatively. Astor died in December 2001, and is buried in All Saints' parish churchyard, Sutton Courtenay in a grave with a simple headstone bearing only his name and years of birth and death. In an adjacent grave is his friend Eric Arthur Blair, better known by his pen name George Orwell. Astor bought both burial plots when he learned that Orwell had asked to be buried in an English country churchyard.

==== The New Era Centre ====
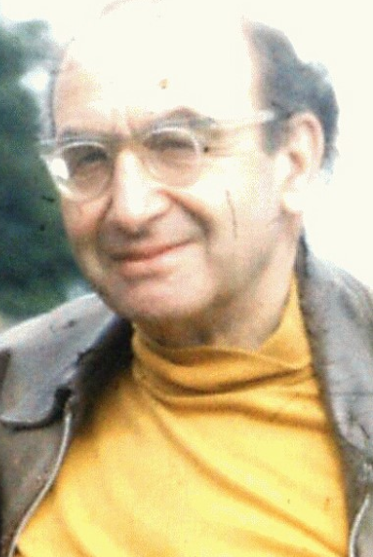
Fred Blum

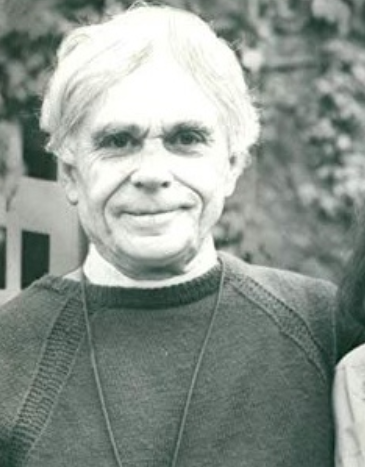
Stephen Verney

Key figures of The New Era Centre.

In 1978, the Astor family sold the house and parts of the grounds, and it came into ownership of a property developer in 1979. After months of torrential rain that hindered work, the house was sold in 1980 to The New Era Centre, a non-profit charity established by Fred Blum in 1967. During his lifetime, Blum became a member of the Quakers, whilst maintaining his Jewish heritage. In 1963, Blum resigned from his academic posts in the United States and pursued a future based in the United Kingdom. In 1969, he met Bishop Stephen Verney at a conference in Coventry where Verney was doing reconciliation work. They became friends, "like brothers", and Verney became a trustee and significant supporter and contributor to the creation and work of The New Era Centre at The Abbey, which became a registered charity on 20 December 1979. Verney was a well-connected individual, and frequently communicated with the politician Roy Jenkins. The residential community of The New Era Centre in The Abbey was dedicated on 4 October 1981 as a space to explore and work towards the synthesis of Christianity and more contemporary understandings of societal transformation. In 1984, after The Abbey was improved to a habitable state, the first two resident community members moved in. Stephen Verney extensively discussed, and believed in, the role Buddhist practice and philosophy could play in increasing connectivity with a Christian deity, and it was this belief which led many of The New Era Centre's early pursuits. Blum spent decades researching, interviewing and publishing on Mahatma Gandhi's life works and legacy. So too did The Abbey welcome Indian thinkers, such as the social activist and spiritual leader Vimala Thakar who, in the 1980s, led a seminar here. Among the earliest events taking place at The Abbey was the annual Gandhi Foundation Summer School that continued to be held there. Verney retired in 1985 and Blum died in January 1990. Much of Blum's work can now be found in The Abbey's library.

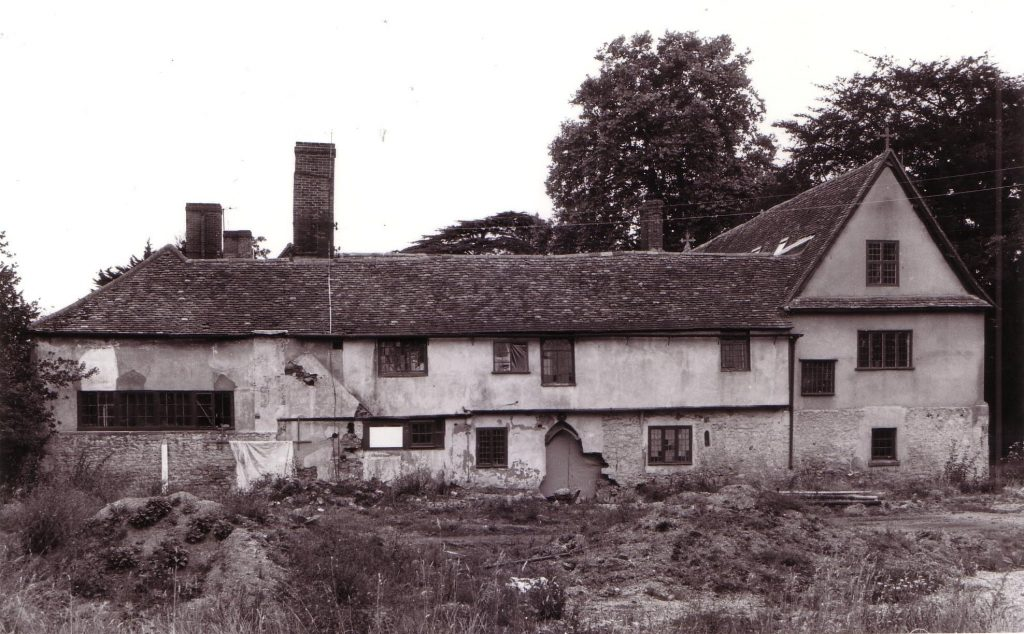
The Abbey in a ruinous state, around 1979.

Twentieth-century landowners had to contend with various states of disrepair, and few have had either the capital or the will to sustain the business. Upon the purchase of The Abbey by The New Era Centre in 1980, a monumental effort was required to source volunteer labour, both locally and from abroad. Sourcing funding was difficult, and some potential investors remained unconvinced that the founders high ideals could lead to anything other than a misuse of funds. However, Blum and Verney remained committed to their project, disputing each critical point. Much of the work was carried out in a co-operative form, such as the 'work camp' of 1981, a community of enthusiastic volunteers. Volunteers from organisations such as WWOOF UK and HelpX still play a vital role in keeping The Abbey alive.

In August 1991, the charity was renamed 'The Abbey, Sutton Courtenay'. Rooted in the Christian tradition yet open to other faiths, The Abbey, Sutton Courtenay is to this day home to a small resident community and serves as a spiritual retreat and conference centre. Around 2006, communal worship moved from group prayers to group meditation and since 2007 concerts have been hosted here as well. In 2008, The Abbey, Sutton Courtenay launched its own website and in 2019 a history research project started as part of its 40th Anniversary Programme.

== Gallery ==
The Abbey, Sutton Courtenay

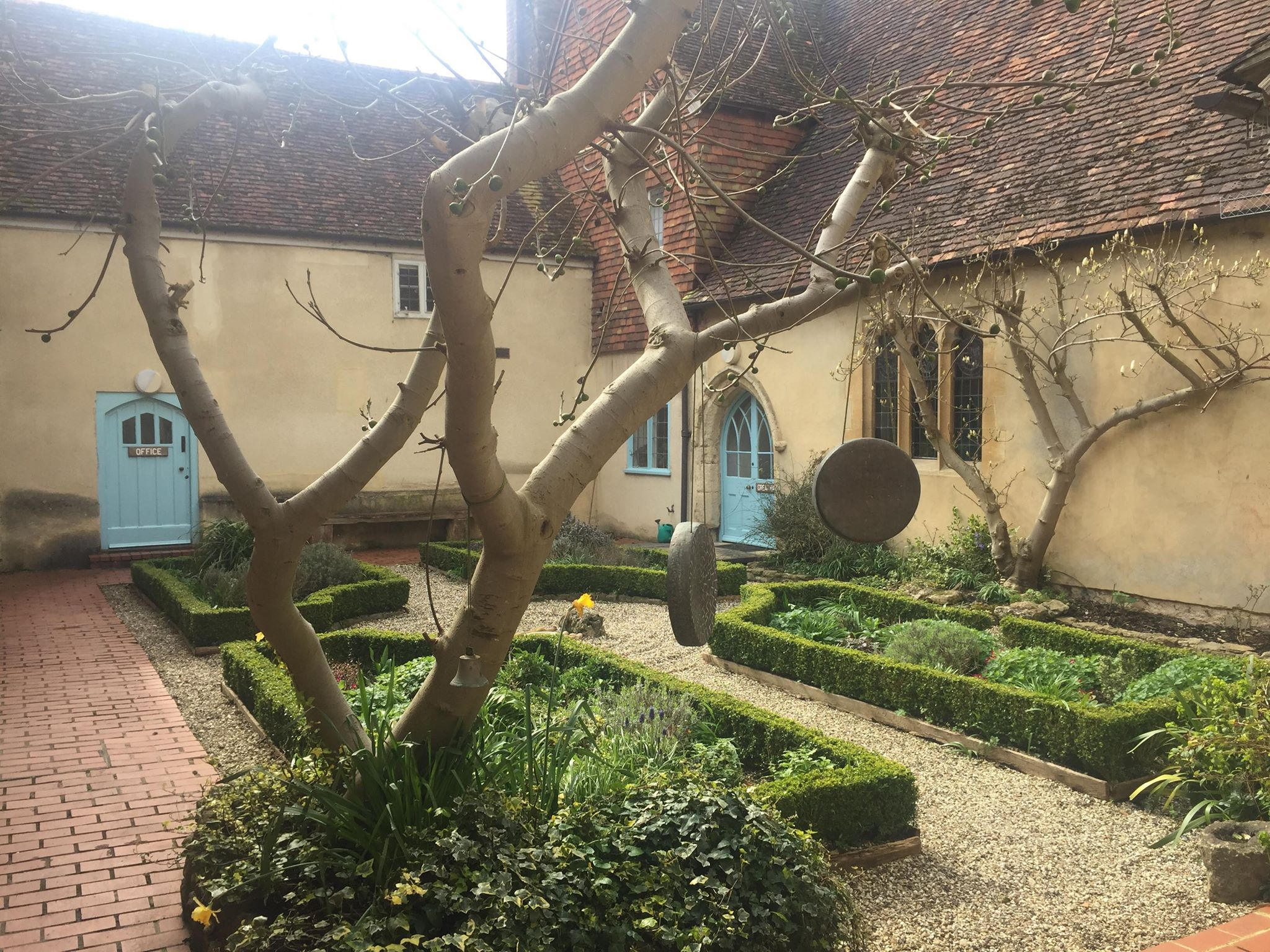
The courtyard

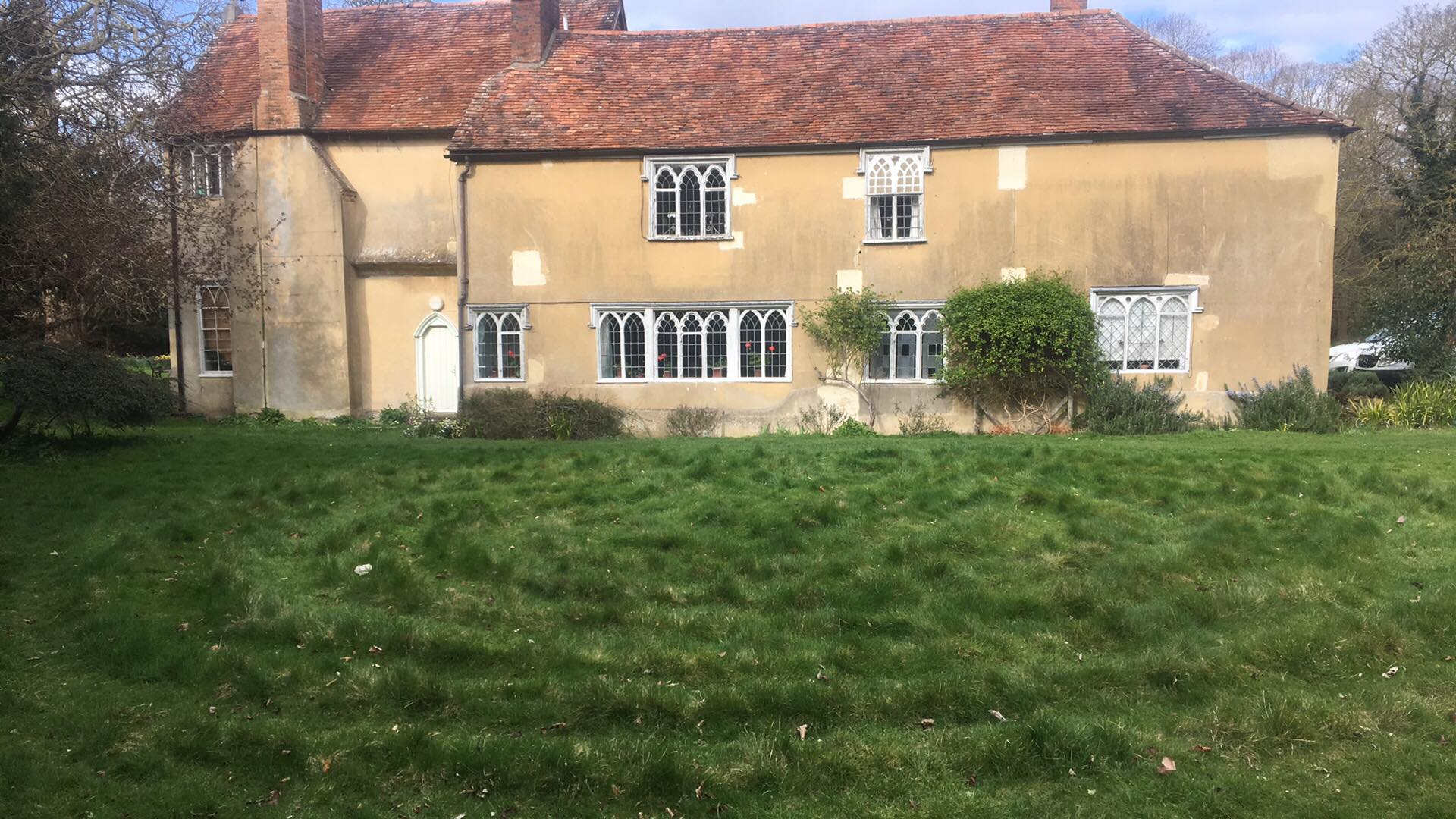
The Abbey as seen from the south with the labyrinth in front.

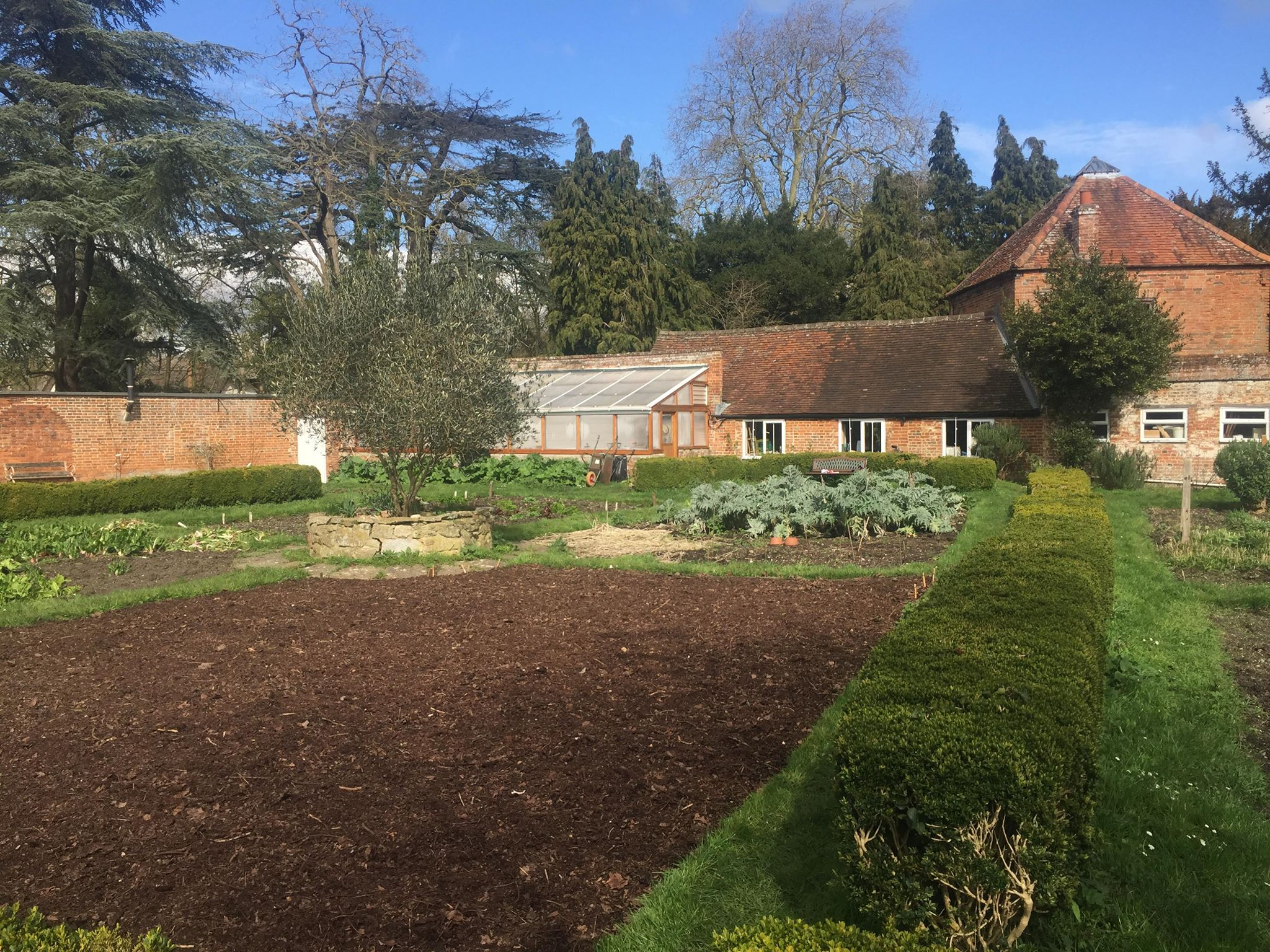
Gardens of The Abbey

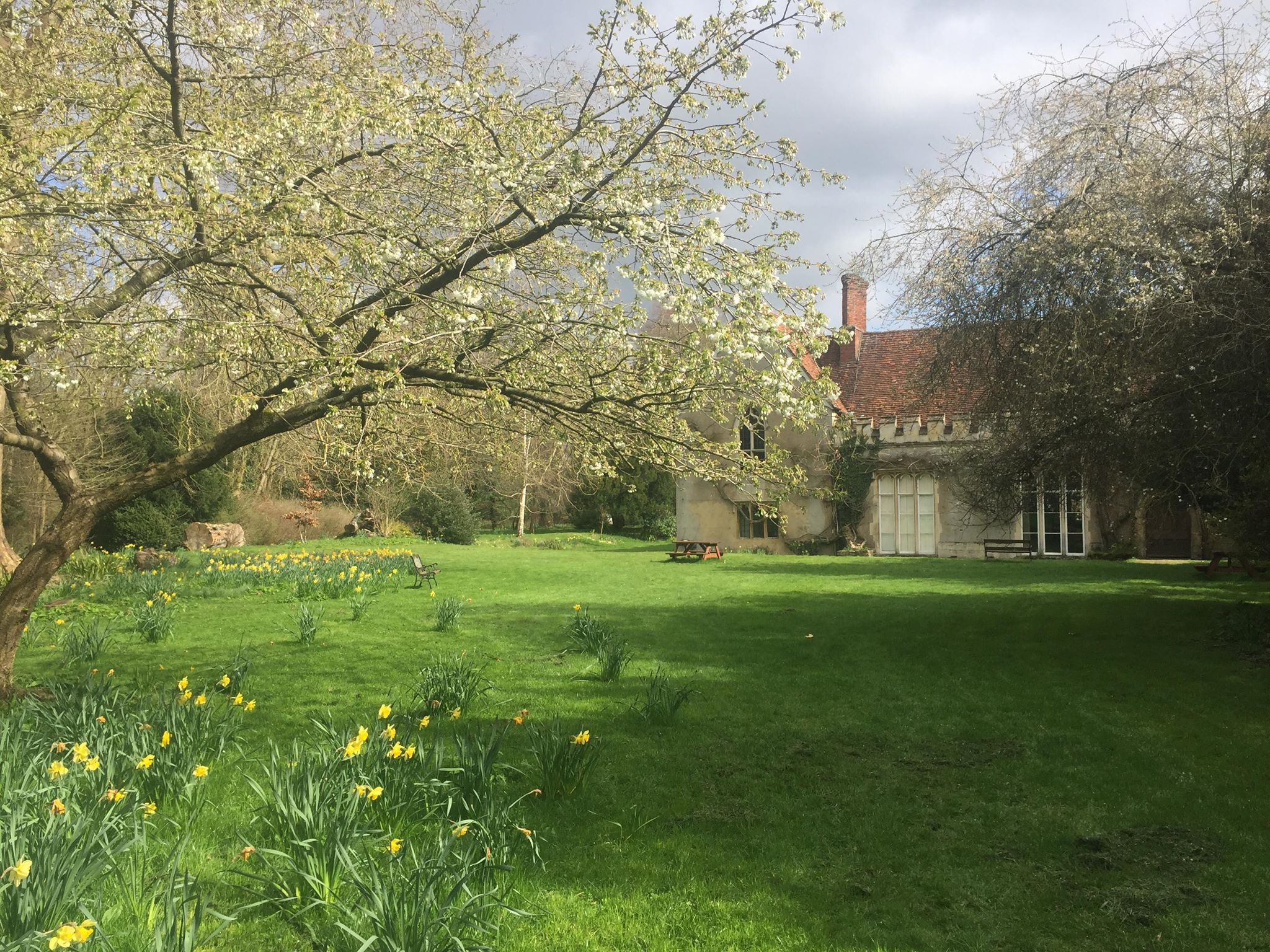
Gardens of The Abbey

== See also ==
- Grade I listed buildings in Vale of White Horse
- List of country houses in the United Kingdom
- Medieval architecture
