= Stephen Verney =

Anglican clergyman and suffragan bishop of Repton (1919–2009)

The Right Reverend Stephen Verney
- Bishop of Repton
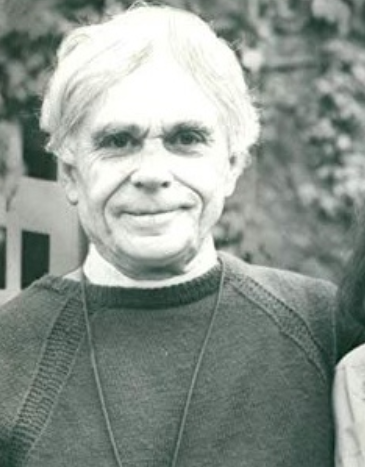
- Church: Church of England
- Diocese: Diocese of Derby
- In office: March 1977 – 1985
- Predecessor: Warren Hunt

Orders
- Ordination: 1950 (deacon); 1951 (priest) by Russell Barry
- Consecration: 31 March 1977 by Donald Coggan

Personal details
- Born: Stephen Edmund Verney; 17 April 1919 Anglesey, Wales
- Died: 9 November 2009 (aged 90)
- Denomination: Anglican
- Parents: Sir Harry Verney, 4th Baronet and Lady Rachel Verney
- Spouse: Priscilla Schwerdt (m. 1947; died 1974) Sandra Bailey (m. 1981)
- Education: Harrow School
- Alma mater: Balliol College, Oxford

Stephen Edmund Verney, MBE (17 April 1919 – 9 November 2009) was the second Bishop of Repton from 1977 to 1985; and from then on an honorary assistant bishop within the Diocese of Oxford. Toward the end of WWII Verney worked as an undercover political operative in occupied Crete.

== Biography ==
Verney was the son of the Liberal MP Sir Harry Verney, 4th Baronet, and grandson of a Viceroy of India. His eldest brother was Sir Ralph Verney, 5th Baronet. Another brother was the judge Sir Lawrence Verney. He was educated at Harrow and Balliol College, Oxford.

At the beginning of the Second World War as a conscientious objector, he served with a Friends Ambulance unit but later became a Royal Army Service Corps private in Cairo. Here as an Oxford classicist he was recruited into the Political Operations Executive and sent into occupied Crete in August 1944, working undercover from Chania, with the objective of lowering German morale. His role principally involved identifying and approaching dissatisfied German soldiers. With the assistance of a German sergeant major, in love with a Cretan Woman, he printed and distributed “Kreta Post” a subtle propaganda paper, in German, from a cave outside Chania.

Following the fall of Mussolini he slipped into the camp of an Italian battalion forced by the Germans to fight on and negotiated with the Colonel the surrender of the entire battalion.

Following the German surrender of Crete he set up an exhibition of photographs received from recently liberated concentration camps. These were not believed by the still armed German soldiers and a grenade was left under his car. He was appointed a Member of the Order of the British Empire in 1945.

In 1947 he married Priscilla Schwerdt; he was made deacon at Michaelmas 1950 (1 October), by Russell Barry, Bishop of Southwell, at Southwell Minster, and ordained priest (presumably the next Michaelmas). He began his career with a curacy at Gedling after which he was: Priest in charge of St Francis Clifton, Nottingham; Vicar of Leamington Hastings; Diocesan Missioner for the Diocese of Coventry then finally, before his appointment to the episcopate, a canon residentiary at Windsor. His first wife died in 1974 and seven years later Verney became the first bishop to marry a divorced woman. He was consecrated a bishop on 31 March 1977, by Donald Coggan, Archbishop of Canterbury at Westminster Abbey. After 8 years as the suffragan bishop in the Diocese of Derby, he retired to Blewbury in 1985.

Verney was active in an organisation called The New Era Centre, which was founded by Dr Fred Blum in 1967. In 1969, Blum met Verney at a conference in Coventry where Verney was doing reconciliation work. They became friends, "like brothers", and Verney became a trustee and significant supporter and contributor to the creation and work of The New Era Centre, which became a registered charity on 20 December 1979. Verney was a well-connected individual, and frequently communicated with the politician Roy Jenkins. The residential community of The New Era Centre in The Abbey, Sutton Courtenay, which was purchased in 1980, was dedicated on 4 October 1981 as a space to explore and work towards the synthesis of Christianity and more contemporary understandings of societal transformation. In 1984, after The Abbey was improved to a habitable state, the first two resident community members moved in. Stephen Verney extensively discussed, and believed in, the role Buddhist practice and philosophy could play in increasing connectivity with a Christian deity, and it was this belief which led many of The New Era Centre's early pursuits.

== Works ==
- Fire in Coventry (Hodder & Stoughton 1964, new edition published by The Diocese of Coventry 2010)
- Water into Wine (London: Fount Paperbacks, 1985)

== Notes ==
Church of England titles
| Preceded by Warren Hunt | Bishop of Repton; 1977–1985 | Succeeded by Henry Richmond |
