= Warren Hunt =

Warren Hunt may refer to:

- Warren Hunt (footballer) (born 1984), English professional footballer
- Warren Hunt (bishop) (1909–1994), inaugural Bishop of Repton, 1965–1977
