= Ockenden International =

English global development organisation

Ockenden International is an English international development non-governmental organisation that helps displaced persons become self-sufficient. They work in Afghanistan, Cambodia, Iran, Lebanon, Pakistan, South Sudan, Sudan and Uganda.

== History ==
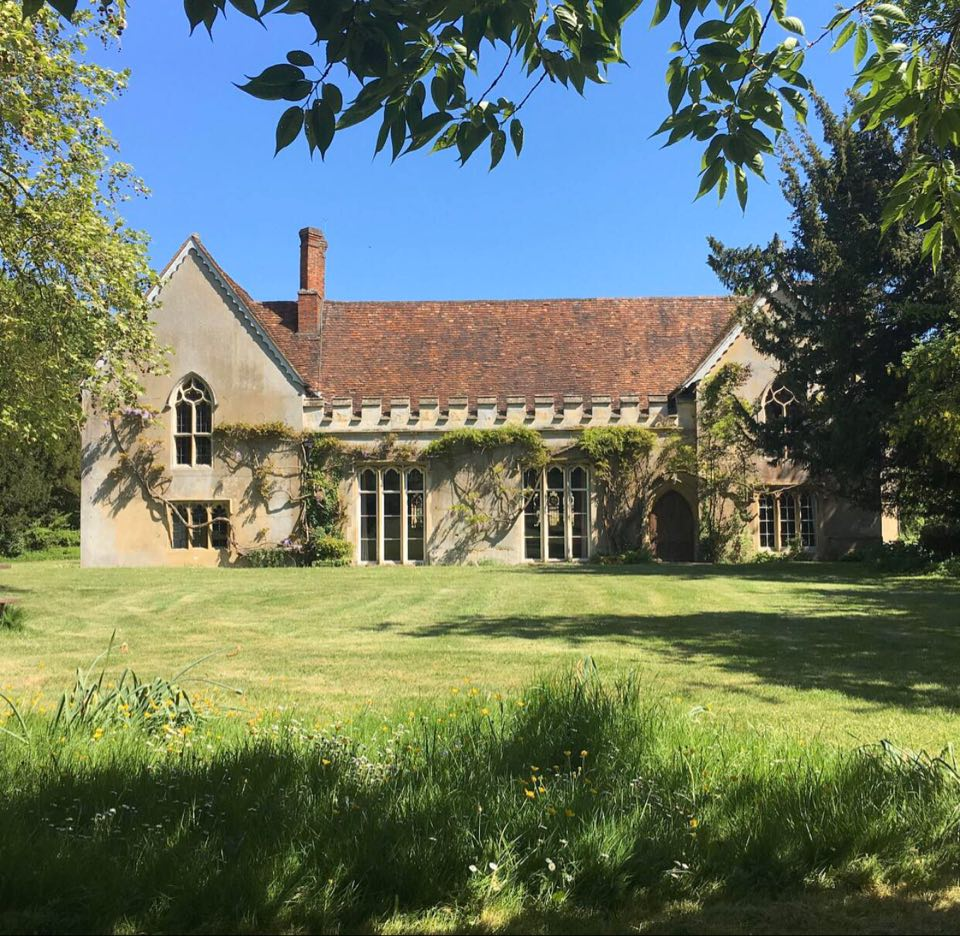
The Abbey, Sutton Courtenay, used by the Ockenden Venture in the 1960s.

Ockenden International was founded in 1951 by Joyce Pearce (1915–1985), Margaret Dixon and Ruth Hicks as the Ockenden Venture. Its name derives from Pearce's family home ‘Ockenden’ in Woking, Surrey and its aim was to help children living in displaced persons' camps in post-war Germany by providing vocational training and shelter. The organisation became a registered charity in 1955. In 1958, the Ockenden Venture took over Donington Hall near Derby as a school for boys.

In 1958, The Abbey, Sutton Courtenay was bought by David Astor (son of Nancy Astor, Viscountess Astor), and publisher of The Observer between 1948 and 1975. From November 1960 until 1970, the Astor family leased The Abbey at a peppercorn rent to the Ockenden Venture. The Abbey was used as a refugee children's home. The current dining room was the school room for Ockenden students, the solar was the girls dormitory and the library housed the boys. The first Ockenden houseparents of The Abbey were Dane and Joan Leadlay. Initially, it housed Polish girls, followed by South African, Tibetan and Romanian students. Margaret Dixon took over the running of The Abbey in 1966, bringing with her some of the older Donington boys.

In October 1962, the Ockenden Venture decided to support non-European children as well and in 1971 it merged with another refugee charity, Lifeline. In 1979, when the government decided to accept Vietnamese boat people into the UK, Ockenden, Save the Children and the British Council for Aid to Refugees were given responsibility for reception and resettlement these families. Houses closed down in the 1990s and in 2001 they only had Kilmore House in Camberley. The Ockenden Venture changed its name to Ockenden International in 1999.

The organisation funds a Junior Research Fellowship at the University of Oxford.
