= Solomon of Rochester =

English judge (died 1294)

Solomon of Rochester (died in 1294) was an English judge who lived in the thirteenth century. He was a native of Rochester, whence he took his name. Solomon took orders from, and was apparently employed by King Henry III of England in a legal capacity.

In 1274 he was appointed justice in eyre for Middlesex, and in the following year for Worcestershire. From this time forward he was constantly employed in this capacity, and among the counties included in his circuits were Essex, Suffolk, Norfolk, Berkshire, Oxfordshire, and Cornwall. He was frequently placed on commissions of oyer and terminer, and for other business, such as taking quo warranto pleas, and inquiring into the concealment of goods forfeited by the Jews. In 1276 he was present at council when the king gave judgment against Gilbert de Clare, 7th Earl of Gloucester, and he was also summoned to councils held in November 1283 and October 1288. In the following year he was, like all the other judges except two, dismissed for maladministration of justice and corruption. He was probably one of the worst offenders, as he was fined four thousand marks, a sum much larger than that extorted from several of the other judges. In 1278, Hugh de Courtenay, Lord of the Manor of Sutton, sued Abingdon Abbey for advowson. An allegedly biased jury was impanneled, presided by Solomon, which in 1284 found unexpectedly for Courtenay. Solomon of Rochester, the chief justice of the eyre, was the first to be patronised by the Courtenays. As rector, Solomon undertook construction work at The Abbey, Sutton Courtenay. On 4 January 1290 his name appears on a commission of oyer and terminer, but he does not appear to have had any further employment. In the parliament of 1290, as a consequence of Rochester's fall, numerous complaints were preferred against his conduct as a judge, one of them being from Abingdon Abbey, from which he had extorted a considerable sum of money to give to his brother Gilbert.

Rochester them aimed at ecclesiastical preferment. He already held the prebend of Chamberlain Wood in St Paul's Cathedral, and on the death of Thomas Ingoldsthorpe, Bishop of Rochester, in May 1291, he made fruitless efforts to induce the monks to elect him to that see. Their refusal deeply offended him, and in a suit between the monks and the bishop of Rochester in 1294 Solomon persuaded the judges in eyre at Canterbury to give a decision adverse to the monks. According to Matthew of Westminster, the monks were avenged by the sudden death of their chief enemies, and the judges in terror sought their pardon, alleging that they had been ‘wickedly deceived by the wisdom of Solomon.’ Solomon himself was one of the victims; on 14 Aug. 1294 one Guynand or Wynand, parson of Snodland in Kent, entered Solomon's house, ate with him, and put poison into his food and drink, so that he died fifteen days afterwards. According to Matthew of Westminster, Guynand only made Solomon drunk. He was charged with the murder, but pleaded his orders, and was successfully claimed as a clerk by the Bishop of Rochester. Finally he purged himself at Greenwich, and was liberated. Solomon de Rochester had a house at Snodland, and another in Rochester, which in 1284 he was licensed to extend to the city walls and even to build on them.

== See also ==
- The Abbey, Sutton Courtenay
