= William Say (priest) =

English priest

William Say (died before 7 December 1468) was an English priest who served as Dean of St Paul's and Archdeacon of Northampton.

He was born the son of John Say and his wife Maud and was the brother of Sir John Say, who became Speaker of the House of Commons. William studied at New College, Oxford, and became proctor of Oxford University in 1440. He gave up that position in the 1440s to become Dean of the Chapel Royal until his death. In the 1440s, he was also rector of The Abbey, Sutton Courtenay, where he undertook construction work.

In 1457, he was elected Dean of St Paul's and in 1464 Archdeacon of Northampton, filling both positions until he died in 1568.

He wrote a detailed account of the position of Dean of the Chapel Royal for the King of Portugal.
