= Manor House, Sutton Courtenay =

Historic building in Sutton Courtenay, Oxfordshire, England, United Kingdom

Coordinates: 51.6438°N 1.2755°W

Manor House
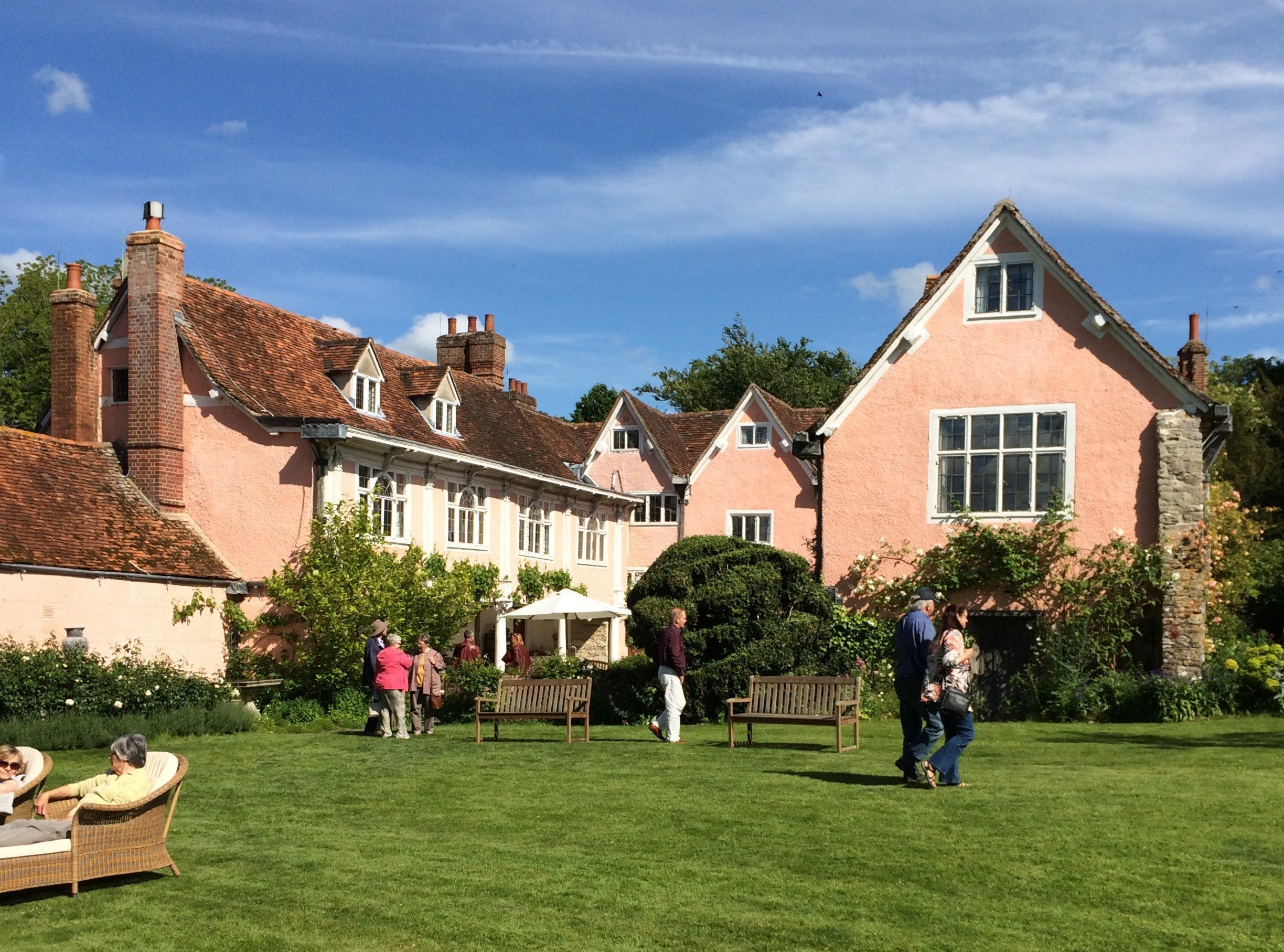
- Sutton Courtenay Manor House viewed from the west side
- Interactive map of the Manor House area

General information
- Classification: Grade II* listed
- Location: Sutton Courtenay, United Kingdom
- Completed: 13th century

The Manor House, Sutton Courtenay, is a Grade II* listed building in the Oxfordshire village, located southwest of the village green and hidden from the main road by trees. It is across the street from The Abbey, Sutton Courtenay, a medieval courtyard house.

== History and description ==
The south wing of the building is believed to originate from the 13th century, with a 15th-century extension to the east and a north wing dating to about 1670. This creates a U-shaped plan around a courtyard which faces onto a garden leading to the River Thames. The main east wing has five gables and a cruck truss frame. Inside there is a 16th-century arched stone fireplace in the dining room. A late-17th-century dog leg staircase connects the ground floor to the attic. The south wing has a barrel-vaulted cellar beneath it and a hall and gallery including 15th-century woodwork.

The building was known as Brunces Court (or Brunts Court) from an early period, having been in the ownership of John Brouns and family since at least the mid 14th century. His great-grandson Richard Brunse passed possessions to his daughter Agnes, wife of William Hulse. Their grandson Thomas Hulse died in 1613 "seised of a mansion or capital messuage and lands". Hulse left his estate to his daughters, including Mary Hulse who married Edmund Wollascot. The Wollascots probably remained living at Brunts Court throughout the 17th century. Thomas Wollascot was living there in 1664. William Wollascot was recorded as having lands there in 1717.

In 1886 the Manor House was purchased by James Lloyd-Lindsay, 1st Baron Wantage who gave the property to the grandson of the 25th Earl of Crawford, Colonel Harry Lindsay, and his wife in 1895. Lindsay and his wife Norah became known as hosts of young intellectuals in their riverside garden. The Manor was purchased from the Lindsay family in 1945 by newspaper owner David Astor, who lived there until his death in 2001.
