= Warren Hunt (bishop) =

William Warren Hunt (called Warren; 22 January 1909 – 29 September 1994) was the inaugural Bishop of Repton from 1965 to 1977; and from then until his death an assistant bishop within the Diocese of Chichester.

He was educated at Keble College, Oxford and Ripon College Cuddesdon. He was deaconed on St Thomas' day 1932 (21 December), by Henry Williams, Bishop of Carlisle, at Rose Castle chapel and priested the following year. In 1935 he made a sideways move to St Martin-in-the-Fields during which time he married Mollie Green: together they had four daughters. From 1940 to the end of the World War II, he was a Chaplain to the Forces after which he became Vicar of St Nicholas Radford, Coventry. He was then successively Vicar of Leamington Spa and Rural Dean of Croydon before his appointment to the episcopate. He was consecrated a bishop on 30 November 1965 by Michael Ramsey, Archbishop of Canterbury, at Westminster Abbey. In 1976, he announced his retirement and the following year moved to Funtington where he lived until his death.

Church of England titles
| New title | Bishop of Repton; 1965–1977 | Succeeded by Stephen Verney |
