= David Astor =

English newspaper publisher

The Honourable David Astor CH

Editor of The Observer
- In office 1948–1975
- Preceded by: Ivor Brown
- Succeeded by: Donald Trelford

Personal details
- Born: Francis David Langhorne Astor; 5 March 1912 London, England
- Died: 7 December 2001 (aged 89) London, England
- Resting place: Sutton Courtenay, Oxfordshire, England
- Spouses: Melanie Hauser (m. 1945; div. 1951) Bridget Aphra Wreford (1952–2001)
- Children: 6
- Parent(s): Waldorf Astor; Nancy Witcher Langhorne
- Education: West Downs School; Eton College; Balliol College, Oxford

Francis David Langhorne Astor (5 March 1912 – 7 December 2001) was an English newspaper publisher, editor of The Observer at the height of its circulation and influence, and member of the Astor family, "the landlords of New York".

== Early life ==
Francis David Langhorne Astor was born at 4 St James's Square, in London, England, the third child of American-born English parents, Waldorf Astor, 2nd Viscount Astor (1879–1952) of the Astor family, and Nancy Witcher Langhorne (1879–1964). The product of an immensely wealthy business dynasty, and raised in the grandeur of a great country estate, Cliveden, where the political and intellectual elite gathered, he nevertheless showed compassion for the poor and those who were victims of destructive socioeconomic policies.

An extremely shy man, David Astor was greatly influenced by his father, but as a young man he rebelled against his strong-willed mother. After an education at West Downs School in Winchester, Hampshire, followed by Eton College in Berkshire, he attended Balliol College, Oxford, where he suffered a nervous breakdown and left in 1933 without graduating. He was psycho-analysed by Anna Freud, and during World War II, he served with distinction as a Royal Marines officer and was wounded in France. While at Balliol in 1931, he met a young anti-fascist German, named Adam von Trott zu Solz, who was to become the most influential figure in his life. Von Trott's involvement in the 1944 plot to assassinate Adolf Hitler led to his execution.

== Career ==
In 1936, Astor joined the Yorkshire Post newspaper, where he worked for a year before joining his father's newspaper, The Observer, which he would edit for 27 years. During World War II he joined the Royal Marines, where he worked in Whitehall as a press officer and was involved in military action in France towards the end of the war, sustaining an injury and subsequently being awarded the Croix de Guerre.

With his father's advancing age, and high inheritance taxes in England, in 1945 David Astor and his brother transferred ownership of The Observer to a board of trustees. The trust contained restrictions so that the paper could not be subject to a hostile takeover but also stipulated that its profits go towards improving the newspaper, promoting high journalistic standards, and required a portion of the profits to be donated to charitable causes.

In 1945, Astor purchased the Manor House at Sutton Courtenay, Oxfordshire, living there and restoring The Abbey in the village, which he bought in 1958 and was across the road from the Manor House. He leased The Abbey to the Ockenden Venture, which used it as a home for refugee children.

=== Observer editor ===
Astor became the editor of The Observer in 1948 and by the mid-1950s, he had made The Observer a successful and influential paper that published points of view from the right and left. Astor's policies were passionate about the plight of black Africans and the violation of human rights, in line with the views of his journalist Colin Legum and associate Michael Scott. He wrote against the death penalty and opposed all censorship. But, he took a more conservative view on the economic problems caused by high taxes and believed British trades unions had become too powerful and were hindering economic progress. He warned of the dangers of big government and of big business, influenced by his friend and employee of The Observer, George Orwell.

Astor broadly supported the Cold War containment policies of Atlantic alliance and consequently had difficulties with The Observer's foreign editor, the German emigre Sebastian Haffner. Haffner was unwilling to dismiss the March 1952 Stalin Note with its offer of Soviet withdrawal in return for German neutrality. In 1954 he accepted a financially generous offer to transfer to Berlin as The Observer's German correspondent but again broke with Astor in 1961 when The Observer refused to call for a more forceful allied response to the building of the Berlin Wall.

With Haffner, in the late 1940s Astor was one of the so-called Shanghai Club (named after a restaurant in Soho) of liberal/left-leaning and emigre journalists that included Orwell, Isaac Deutscher (who as a roving European correspondent also wrote for the Observer), E. H. Carr, Barbara Ward, and Jon Kimche.

In 1956, David Astor and his newspaper came under fire when it accused Prime Minister Anthony Eden of lying to the people about important matters in Suez Crisis. Although he ultimately was shown to have been right, the situation harmed the paper's image and its circulation and advertising revenue began to decline. Astor's causes included playing a main role in establishing Amnesty International in 1961 after his paper published "The Forgotten Prisoners" by Peter Benenson. He also voiced strong opposition to the apartheid policy of the white South African government and supported the African National Congress (ANC). Nelson Mandela would refer to Astor as one of the best and most loyal of friends who had supported the ANC when other newspapers ignored them.

Despite his great wealth, David Astor lived modestly, putting his money to good use through a network of benefactions and charities. Although he proved a brilliant editor, he lacked the drive for profits like other newcomers to the business who took advantage to increase rapidly both their advertising and circulation at the expense of The Observer. When The Daily Telegraph launched a Sunday edition in 1961 it changed what had been a staid industry and the ensuing battles for advertising changed the character of how and what newspapers were all about. The aggressive marketing by The Sunday Times under Canadian newspaper tycoon Roy Thomson hurt circulation while the paper's unions were making repeated demands that drove costs to a point where the operation became an unsustainable business.

In April 1962, Astor gave a speech about the roots of political extremism, which led to the formation of the Columbus Centre, led by Professor Norman Cohn, and which became a research centre at the University of Sussex.

== Later life ==
In 1975, Astor resigned as editor of The Observer but continued as a trustee. In 1977 the paper was sold by his family to Robert O. Anderson, the American owner of the Atlantic Richfield Oil Company, with Astor feeling dismayed when the paper was later sold to Tiny Rowland in the early 1980s. In his retirement Astor continued to support a number of charities and to finance pressure groups for causes that he strongly believed in. He was appointed as a member of the Order of the Companions of Honour (CH) in the 1994 New Year Honours "for public and charitable services". In 1995 David Astor was awarded an Honorary Doctorate of Letters from Plymouth University.

=== Campaign for Myra Hindley ===
During the 1980s and 1990s, he campaigned alongside Lord Longford to try and gain parole for the Moors Murderer Myra Hindley, claiming that she was a reformed character and no threat to society, and had therefore qualified for parole from the life sentence imposed on her in 1966 for her role with Ian Brady in the murder of three children. He continued his campaign even after Hindley admitted taking part in two more murders in 1986. In September 1990, he even claimed that her continued imprisonment was comparable to that of Nelson Mandela, who had just been released from prison in South Africa after serving 27 years of a life sentence for his part in the battle against the oppression of black people under that country's apartheid regime. Astor had also been a supporter of the campaign for Mandela's release from prison.

Along with Longford, he claimed that she was being kept in prison to serve the interests of successive Home Secretaries and their governments (who had the power to decide on minimum terms for life sentence prisoners from 1983 until 2002); these politicians gradually increased Hindley's original minimum of 25 to 30 years and from 1990 to a whole life tariff. The campaign to win parole for Myra Hindley was unsuccessful, with her appeal against the whole life tariff being rejected three times by the High Court, and she remained in prison until her death in November 2002, almost a year after Astor's own death. Longford had died earlier in 2001.

Astor had been a supporter of Mandela and an opponent of South Africa's apartheid regime since shortly after Mandela was jailed in 1964. He continued to support the campaign for Mandela's release until he was finally set free from prison in February 1990 and continued to oppose the apartheid regime until it was finally completely abolished four years later, just before Mandela became the president of South Africa.

Astor was one of the founders of the Koestler Trust in the 1960s and continued to support the scheme until his death. Arthur Koestler, the writer, was a friend who contributed articles to The Observer. The Koestler Trust was set up as a charity to promote creative arts in prisons; Astor was the Trust's chair for a period.

== Personal life ==
In 1945, he married for the first time to Melanie Hauser, with whom he had one child:

- Frances Christine Langhorne Astor (b. 1947)

After his divorce from Melanie in 1951, he married Bridget Aphra Wreford (1928–2019) in 1952. David and Bridget had five children:

- Alice Margaret Frances Astor (b. 1953)
- Richard David Langhorne Astor (b. 1955)
- Lucy Aphra Nancy Astor (b. 1958)
- Nancy Bridget Elizabeth Astor (b. 1960)
- Thomas Robert Langhorne Astor (b. 1962)

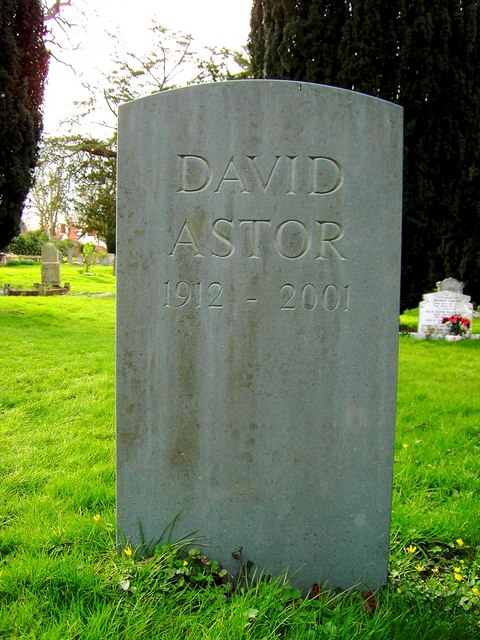
David Astor's headstone in All Saints' parish churchyard, Sutton Courtenay

David Astor died in December 2001 at the age of 89, and is buried in All Saints' parish churchyard, Sutton Courtenay, Oxfordshire, in a grave with a simple headstone bearing only his name and years of birth and death. In an adjacent grave is his friend Eric Arthur Blair, better known by his pen name George Orwell. Astor bought a burial plot for George when he learned that there were no burial plots available in London, where Orwell had died.

Media offices
Preceded by Ivor Brown	Editor of The Observer; 1948–1975	Succeeded by Donald Trelford
