= HelpX =

American hospitality corporation

- Headquarters: London, England
- Area served: Worldwide
- Founder: Rob Prince
- Industry: Tourism; Volunteering
- Products: Homestay
- Website: www.helpx.net
- Launched: April 2001; 25 years ago

HelpX, short for "Help Exchange", is a barter platform in which people offer or receive homestays, including lodging and food, in exchange for performing agreed-upon tasks for a few hours each day. Types of work include gardening, animal welfare, cooking, and farming, among others. The site uses a subscription business model.

== History ==
HelpX was founded in April 2001 by Rob Prince, from England. Prince traveled in Australia and New Zealand, where he worked at several locations in exchange for room and board, inspiring him to develop the website.
