= Reconciliation (theology) =

Christian theological concept

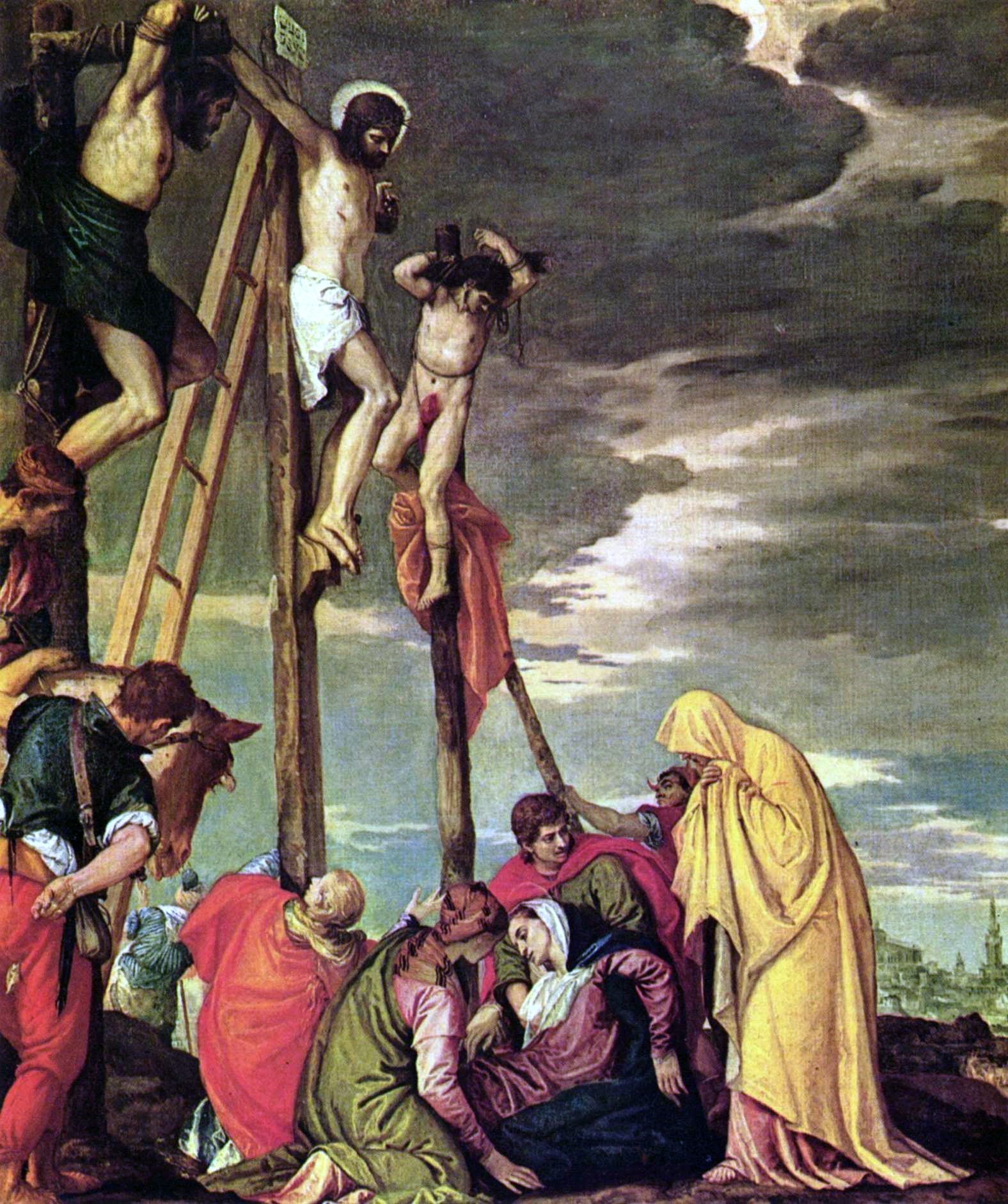
Kalvarienberg by Paolo Veronese.

Reconciliation, in Christian theology, is an element of salvation that refers to the results of atonement. Reconciliation is the end of the estrangement, caused by original sin, between God and humanity. John Calvin describes reconciliation as the peace between humanity and God that results from the expiation of religious sin and the propitiation of God's wrath. Evangelical theologian Philip Ryken describes reconciliation in this way; "It is part of the message of Salvation that brings us back together with God. ... God is the author, Christ is the agent and we are the ambassadors of reconciliation (2 Corinthians 5)." Although it is only used five times in the Pauline corpus (Romans 5:10-11, 11:15, 2 Corinthians 5:18-20, Ephesians 2:14-17 and Colossians 1:19-22) it is an essential term, describing the "substance" of the gospel and salvation. Ralph Martin writing in the Dictionary of Paul and his Letters, suggests reconciliation is at the center of Pauline theology. Stanley Porter writing in the same volume suggests a conceptual link between the reconciliation Greek word group katallage (or katallasso) and the Hebrew word shalom (שָׁלוֹם), generally translated as 'peace.'

== See also ==
- Atonement in Christianity
- Atonement in Judaism
