= Clifton Lock =

Lock on the River Thames in Oxfordshire, England

Coordinates: 51.64844°N 1.21080°W

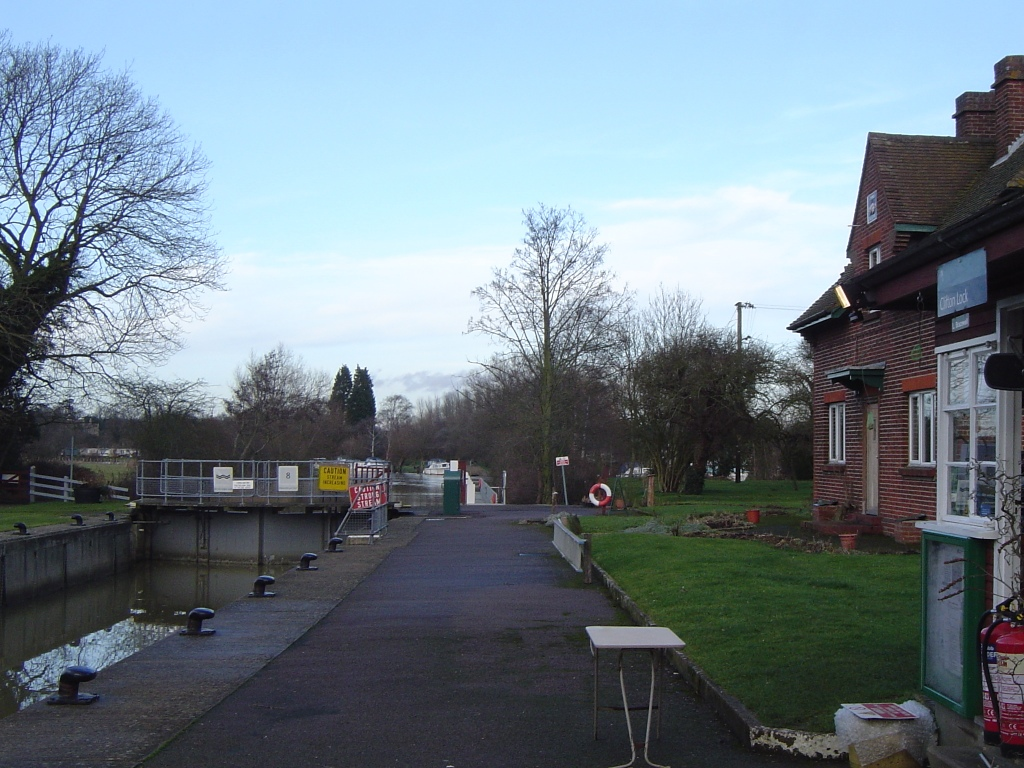
- Clifton Lock - gates showing some ambiguity over board status (yellow or red)
- Interactive map of Clifton Lock
- Waterway: River Thames
- County: Oxfordshire
- Maintained by: Environment Agency
- Operation: Hydraulic
- First built: 1822
- Length: 39.57 m (129 ft 10 in)
- Width: 5.79 m (19 ft 0 in)
- Fall: 1.03 m (3 ft 5 in)
- Above sea level: 153'
- Distance to Teddington Lock: 79 miles

Clifton Lock is a lock on River Thames in Oxfordshire, England. It is located south of the village of Clifton Hampden and north of Long Wittenham. It is at the start of the Clifton Cut, which bypasses the river to the north of Long Wittenham. The lock was completed in 1822 by the Thames Navigation Commissioners.

The main weir, which was built thirteen years later than the lock, runs across the old navigation of the river. A smaller weir runs just above the lock.

== History ==
Clifton is one of the few lock sites on the non-tidal river where there was not a pre-existing weir and flash lock, although there was an important ferry. Problems to navigation had long been recognised and the first suggestions for creating a lock "near Clifton Ferry" occurred in 1793, being raised again in 1811.

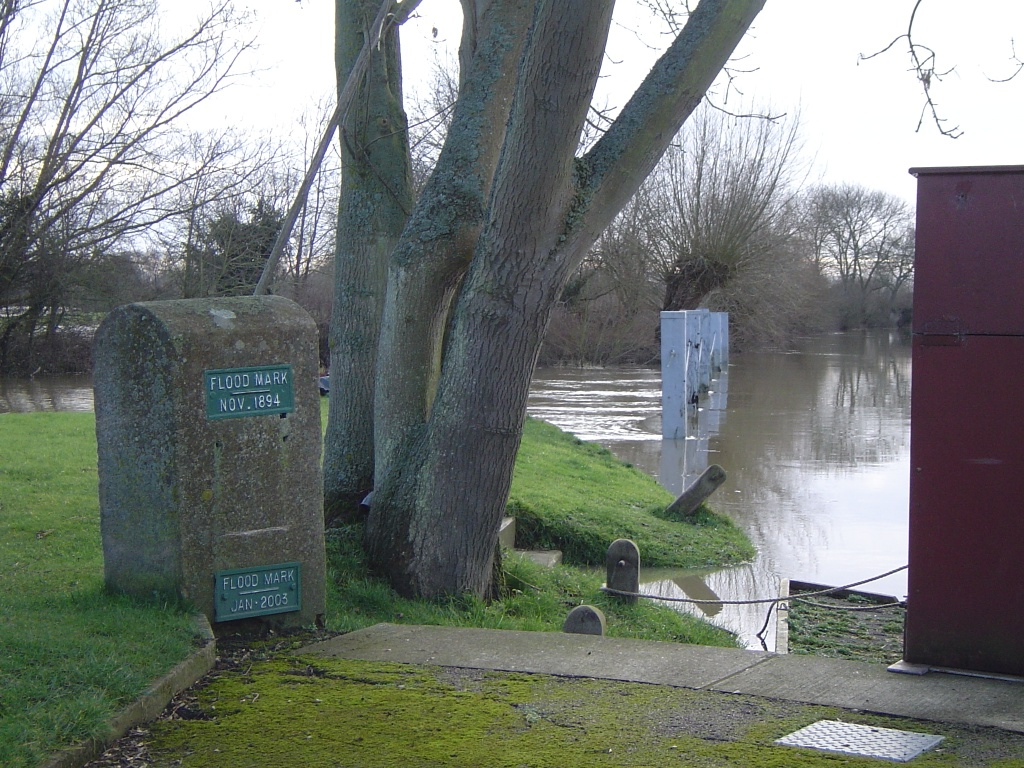
Taken when a high stream is running almost level over the tumbling bay and backwater. The lower marker is the flood level in 2003; the higher marker in 1894

The construction of the lock cut was delayed because the owner of the land was "a lunatic", but it was eventually completed in 1822 together with the lock. No weir was built at the time, giving rise to complaints. In 1826, the Lord Mayor of London visited Oxford by boat, and the City Barge, shallop and attendant boats were "detained at Clifton a considerable length of time."

The weir was eventually erected on the old navigation in 1835 so the towpath around the old navigation channel fell into disuse. It was enlarged by 1877 and a tumbling bay was created close to the lock. The lock cut bridges were rebuilt in 1884.

== Access to the Lock ==
The lock is at the end of a long track which starts on the A415 road to Abingdon just opposite Fullamor Farm to the west of Clifton Hampden village. This is joined by another track running southwestwards from High Street in Clifton Hampden, then continues to the lock. These tracks are not public roads as local signs state "Farm access only".

== Reach above the lock ==
The Clifton cut takes the navigation for nearly a mile before the reaching the weir to the river's natural course past Long Wittenham. The reach is alongside farmland, crossed about halfway along by the Appleford Railway Bridge. Just before Sutton Bridge the river again divides between an old course, now a weir stream, past the old mill at Sutton Courtenay and Sutton Pools; with the navigation following the Culham Cut.

The river meander has some public footpath access, although the Thames Path follows the navigation cutting, and the northern bank all the way to Culham Lock.

== See also ==
- Locks on the River Thames

Next lock upstream	River Thames	Next lock downstream
Culham Lock; 4.52 km (2.81 mi)	Clifton Lock; Grid reference: SU547947	Day's Lock; 4.80 km (2.98 mi)
