= The Barley Mow, Clifton Hampden =

The Barley Mow
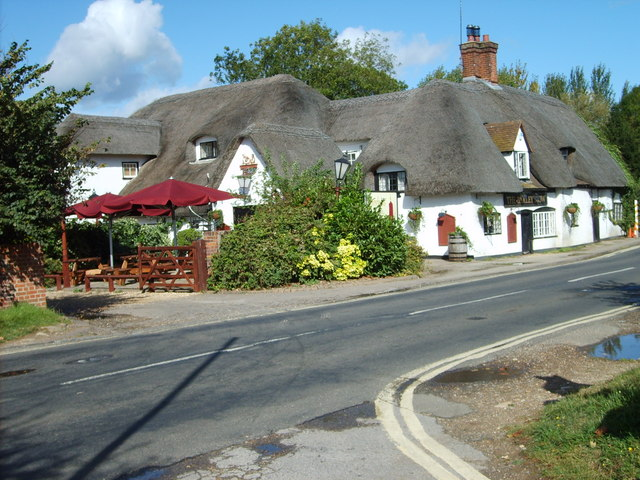
- The Barley Mow in 2007

- Location within Oxfordshire

General information
- Architectural style: Cruck construction
- Location: Clifton Hampden, Abingdon, Oxfordshire, OX14 3EH, Clifton Hampden, United Kingdom
- Coordinates: 51°39′13″N 1°12′33″W
- Owner: Spirit Pub Company

Website
- Website

The Barley Mow is a historic public house, just south of the River Thames near the bridge at Clifton Hampden, Oxfordshire, England.

== Overview ==
The pub has been called "the best known of all Thames pubs". The timber-framed building dates back to 1352 and is of traditional construction with a thatched roof.

The Barley Mow was photographed by Henry Taunt in 1877. The building was Grade II listed in 1952.

According to the Thames Pilot, The Barley Mow was described in Parker's notes (1911):

Its high overhanging roof is thatched, and its walls are half timbered. The casements admit just enough light to heighten the interior effect. The brick floored kitchen, or may be a parlour, is delightfully snug, and the walls are darkly panelled all round. This Hotel has been enlarged to meet modern requirements but the additional part is not shown as it spoils the effect.

The Barley Mow is currently run by Greene King, a large UK chain of pubs, restaurants and inns which operates the Barley Mow under their "Chef & Brewer" brand.

== In literature ==
The Barley Mow was notably featured in chapter 18 of Jerome K. Jerome's 1889 novel Three Men in a Boat:

If you stay the night on land at Clifton, you cannot do better than put up at the "Barley Mow." It is, without exception, I should say, the quaintest, most old-world inn up the river. It stands on the right of the bridge, quite away from the village. Its low-pitched gables and thatched roof and latticed windows give it quite a story-book appearance, while inside it is even still more once-upon-a-timeyfied.

It is also mentioned in the 1883 The Dictionary of the Thames by Charles Dickens, Jr., who notes that:

...although the house is primitive, and the entertainment unpretending, it is a capital little inn of its class, and may be recommended to all boating men.

Peter Lovesey's Swing, Swing Together mentions the Barley Mow.

== Gallery ==
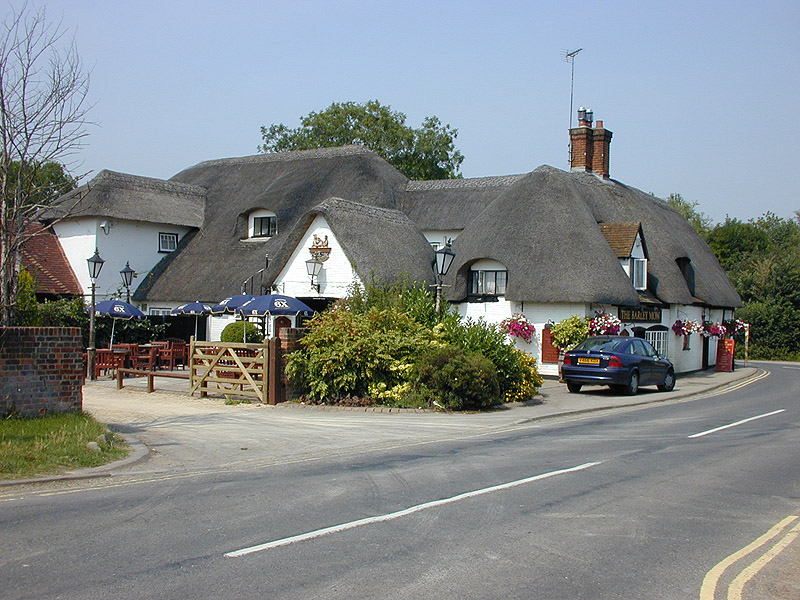
General view.

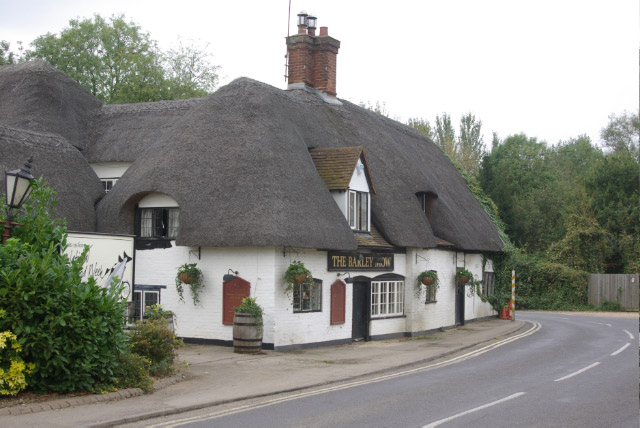
Closer view.

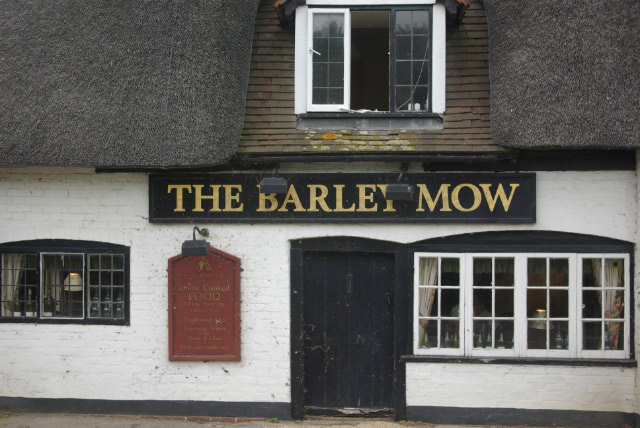
The entrance.

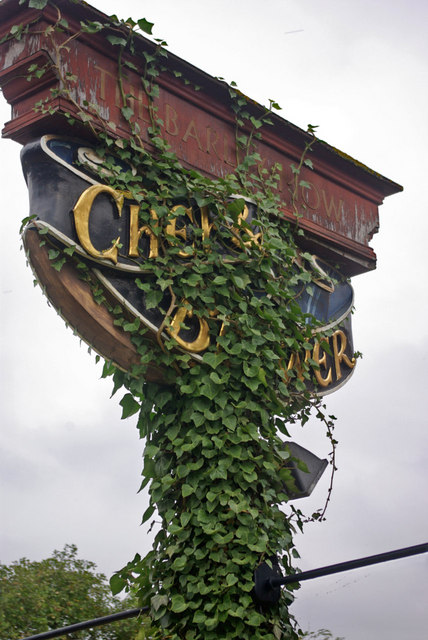
The Chef and Brewer pub sign, on the opposite side of the lane from the pub itself.

== See also ==
- The Bull at Sonning, also mentioned in Three Men in a Boat

== Bibliography ==
- Jerome, Jerome K. Three Men in a Boat (To Say Nothing of the Dog). J. W. Arrowsmith, 1889.
- Richardson, Sir Albert Edward, and Hector Othon Corfiato. The Art of Architecture. Greenwood Press, 1972.
- Winn, Christopher. I Never Knew That About the River Thames. Ebury Press, 2010.
