= Hugh Sinclair (disambiguation) =

Hugh Sinclair may refer to:

- Hugh Sinclair (1873–1939), director of British Naval Intelligence
- Hugh Sinclair (actor) (1903–1962), Hollywood film actor of the 1930s–'40s
- Hugh Sinclair (politician) (1864–1926), Australian politician
- Hugh Macdonald Sinclair (1910–1990), British nutrition researcher
- Hugh Sinclair (rugby union), Australian rugby player
