= Clifton Hampden =

Village in Oxfordshire, England

Coordinates: 51°39′26″N 1°12′35″W

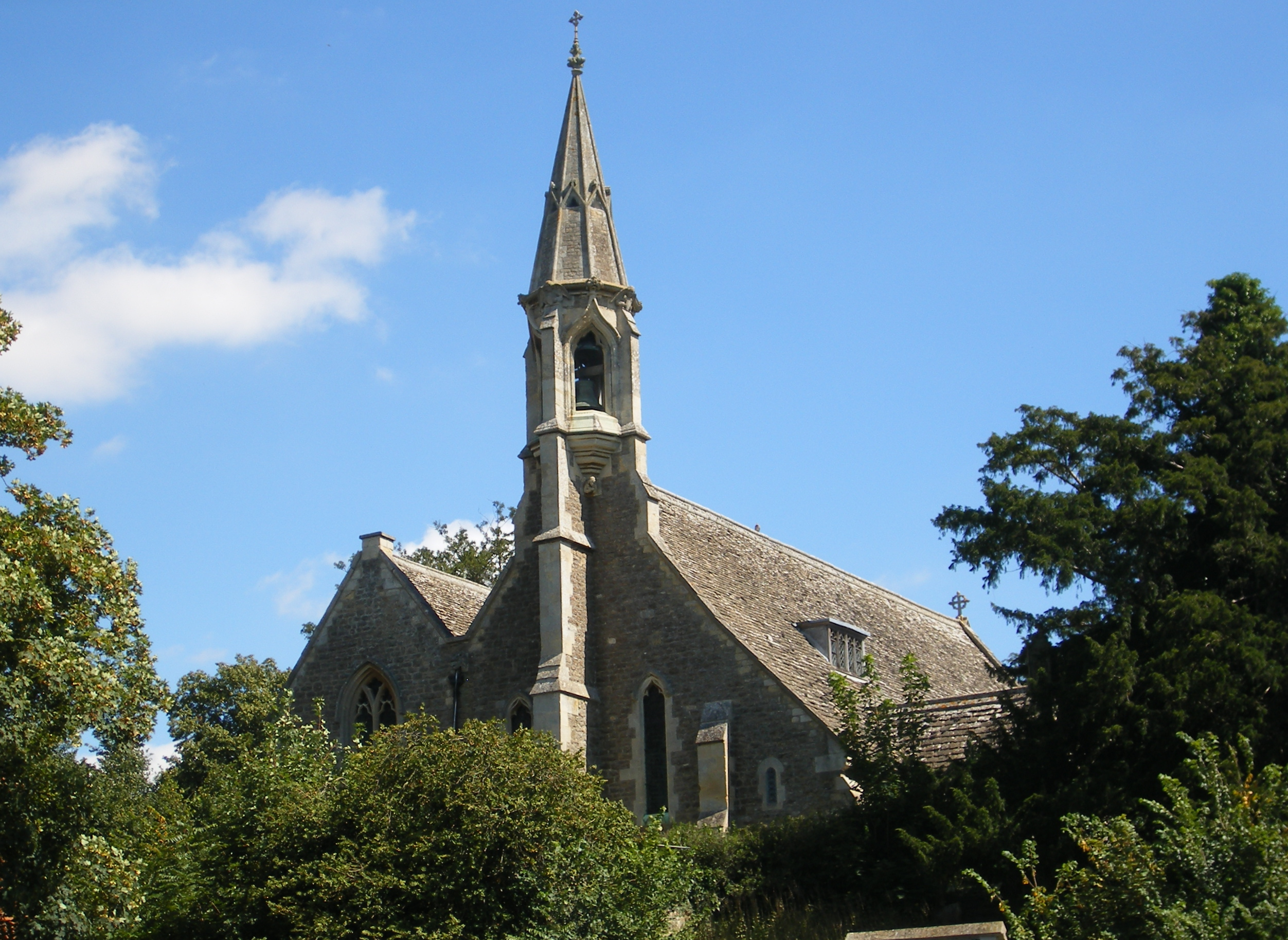
- Parish church of St Michael & All Angels

- Location within Oxfordshire
- Area: 7.78 km^{2} (3.00 sq mi)
- Population: 662 (parish, including Burcot) (2011 census)
  - Density: 85/km^{2} (220/sq mi)
- OS grid reference: SU5495
- Civil parish: Clifton Hampden
- District: South Oxfordshire
- Shire county: Oxfordshire
- Region: South East
- Country: England
- Sovereign state: United Kingdom
- Post town: Abingdon
- Postcode district: OX14
- Dialling code: 01235
- Police: Thames Valley
- Fire: Oxfordshire
- Ambulance: South Central
- UK Parliament: Didcot and Wantage
- Website: Clifton Hampden & Burcot Parish Council

Clifton Hampden is a village and civil parish on the north bank of the River Thames, just over 3 miles (5 km) east of Abingdon in Oxfordshire. Since 1932 the civil parish has included the village of Burcot, 1 mile (1.6 km) east of Clifton Hampden. The 2011 census recorded the parish population as 662.

== Manor ==
The toponym was originally simply "Clifton", meaning "tun on a cliff" in Old English. There is no documentation for the "Hampden" part of the name from before 1726. In the Anglo-Saxon era Clifton belonged to the Bishop of Dorchester. After the Norman Conquest of England William the Conqueror transferred the see to Lincoln, with its properties including Clifton.

== Parish church ==
The Church of England parish church of St Michael and All Angels was a chapel of Dorchester parish until the 19th century. The oldest parts of the church include the arcade of the south aisle, which was built in about 1180. Elsewhere in the church are three 13th century Early English lancet windows. The south aisle ends in a Decorated Gothic chapel that was added in the 14th century. The Perpendicular Gothic arcade of the north aisle is later. In 1843–44 the church was rebuilt to the designs of George Gilbert Scott, who ornamented the chancel as a memorial to the benefactor who funded the restoration.

Clifton Hampden Manor was originally the parsonage, and was designed by Scott in about 1843-46 for Henry Hucks Gibbs, who in 1896 became Hucks Gibbs, 1st Baron Aldenham.

== Economic and social history ==
By the early part of the 13th century the parish was being farmed with an open field system. In the 15th century it was a three-field system and the fields were called East, Down and Ham. In 1726 the same fields were called Upper, Middle and Lower, respectively. The land was inclosed in 1770. From at least the early part of the 14th century there was a ferry across the Thames between the village and Long Wittenham. Several cottages in the village survive from the later part of the 16th and early part of the 17th centuries.

By 1726 the village had three public houses. By 1786 there was one called the Fleur de Lys, and this was still in business by 1864. The Plough beside Abingdon Road was a public house by 1821; it still trades under the same name but is now a restaurant. In 1736 the Parliament passed the first of several Acts to turn the main road between Abingdon and Dorchester into a turnpike. The section through Clifton Hampden ceased to be a turnpike in 1873. In 1922 the Ministry of Transport classified it as the A415 road. In 1928, Oxfordshire County Council built a new bridge for the A415 beside the 15th century one.

In 1822 the Thames Navigation Commissioners built the 1/2 mile (800 m) long Clifton Cut, a navigation that bypasses a shallow and difficult stretch of river. It ends with Clifton Lock, 1/2 mile (800 m) above Clifton Hampden ferry. In 1867 the ferry was replaced by the Clifton Hampden Bridge, a brick structure designed by George Gilbert Scott. This was a toll bridge until 1946, when Berkshire and Oxfordshire county councils took it over. The Barley Mow just on the far side of Clifton Hampden Bridge is in Long Wittenham parish. In 1889 the novelist Jerome K. Jerome featured the village and the Barley Mow, in his book Three Men in a Boat.

Round Clifton Hampden, itself a wonderfully pretty village, old-fashioned, peaceful, and dainty with flowers, the river scenery is rich and beautiful. If you stay the night on land at Clifton, you cannot do better than put up at the "Barley Mow."

In 1844, the Great Western Railway opened an extension from Didcot to Oxford. The GWR opened a station on the main road between the village and Culham. The station is closest to Clifton Hampden but it is in Culham parish and the GWR called it Culham. The Church of England school was built in 1847 and affiliated to the National Society for Promoting Religious Education. It had only one schoolroom until 1909, when an infants' room was added. In 1934 the school was reorganised as a junior school, with senior pupils being schooled in Dorchester. Since 1951 it has been a Church of England voluntary controlled primary school. The village hall was built in 1896. When the band Radiohead formed, and at that time called itself "On A Friday", it practiced in this hall.

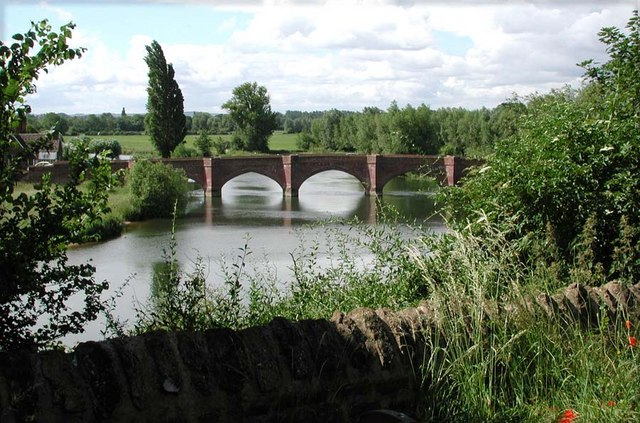
Clifton Hampden Bridge seen from downstream

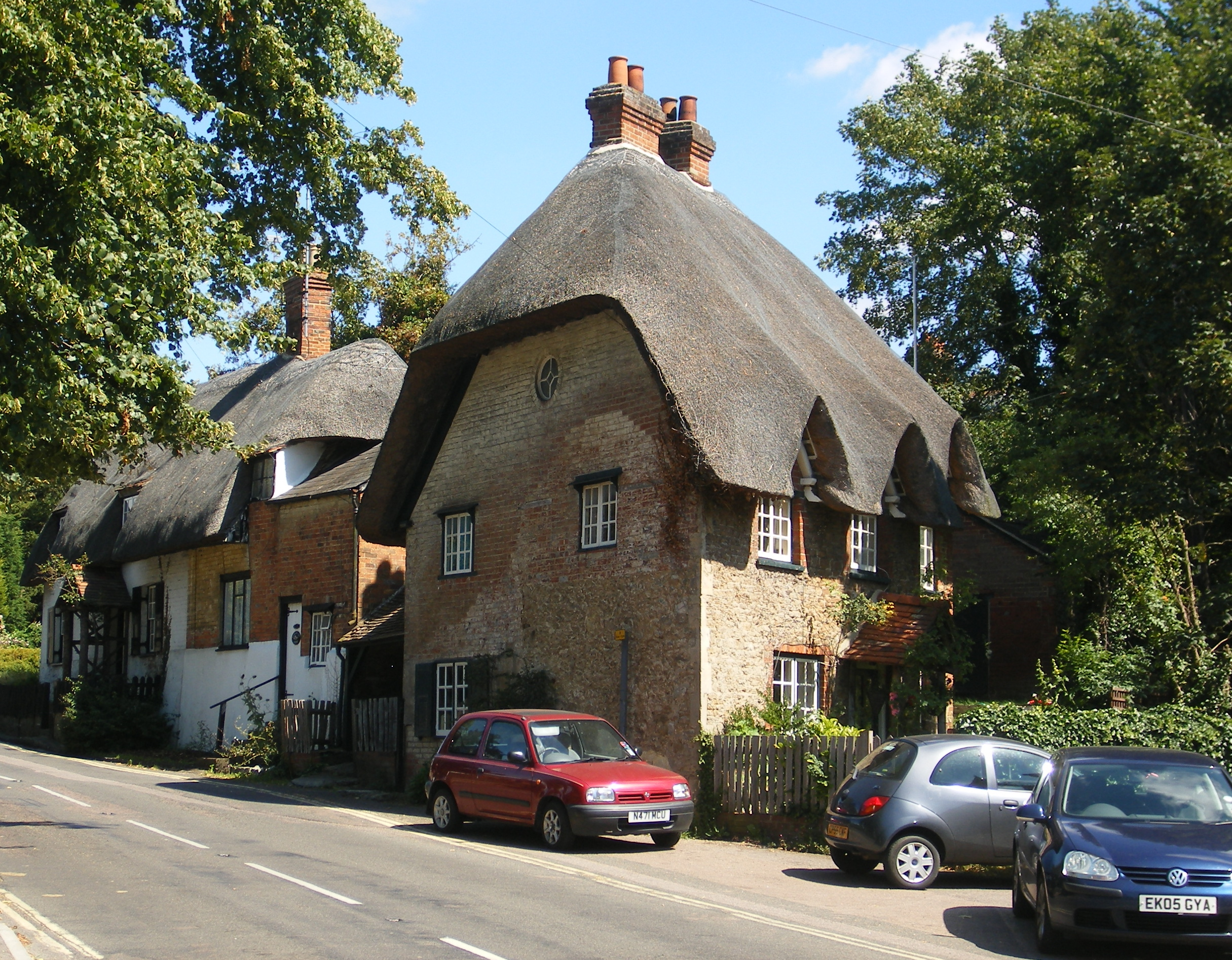
Thatched cottages at Clifton Hampden.

== RNAS Culham ==
In 1941, the Fleet Air Arm opened Royal Naval Air Station, HMS Hornbill, between Culham railway station and Clifton Hampden village. Most of the airfield is in Clifton Hampden parish, but Hornbill was generally called RNAS Culham. The Admiralty closed the airfield in 1956 and transferred it to the UK Atomic Energy Authority in 1960. The former airfield is now the Culham Science Centre, an 800,000 square metre scientific research site that includes two nuclear fusion experiments: JET and MAST. The START Nuclear Fusion Experiment was also conducted on the site until MAST succeeded it in 1999.

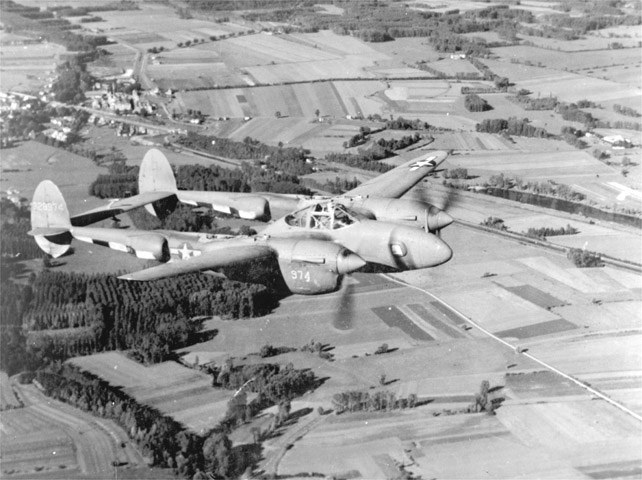
USAAF Lockheed P-38F Lightning similar to that from RAF Mount Farm which crashed at Clifton Hampden

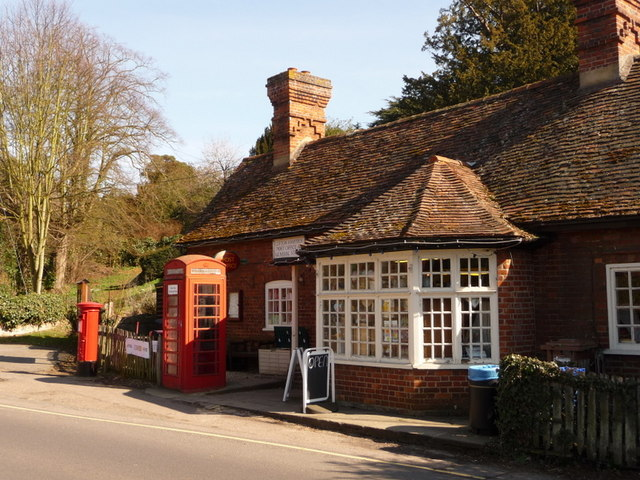
The sub-post office and village shop

== Amenities ==
Clifton Hampden has a village shop and sub-post office and a GPs' practice, Clifton Hampden and Burcot have a Women's Institute. Clifton Hampden Cricket Club play in the Oxfordshire Cherwell League. The village also has a longbow archery society. A pedigree herd of alpacas, the "Lost City Alpacas", is kept at the village.

== Air crash ==
On 20 July 1944 a USAAF Lockheed P-38F Lightning photo-reconnaissance aircraft from nearby RAF Mount Farm attempted a forced landing at Clifton Hampden, but hit treetops in The Coppice and crashed into a field. The aircraft, which was carrying drop tanks, exploded and burned on impact. Witnesses reported that one of the Lightning's twin engines had stopped and the other was barely turning. The pilot, 2nd Lieut Robert Mitchell of the 22nd Photographic Reconnaissance Squadron, 7th Reconnaissance Group, was killed. He is buried at the US military cemetery near Cambridge.

== See also ==
- Chiselhampton, where an RAF Armstrong Whitworth Whitley bomber aircraft crashed in 1941, killing all six people aboard
- Little Baldon air crash, in which an RAF Handley Page Hastings crashed in 1965, killing all 41 people aboard

== Sources ==
- Jerome, Jerome K. (1889). Three Men in a Boat (To Say Nothing of the Dog). Bristol: J. W. Arrowsmith. ISBN 0-7653-4161-1.
- Lobel, Mary D, ed. (1962). A History of the County of Oxford. Victoria County History. Vol. 7: Thame and Dorchester Hundreds. London: Oxford University Press for the Institute of Historical Research. pp. 16–27.
- Phillips, Geoffrey (1981). Thames Crossings. Newton Abbot: David & Charles. p. 65. ISBN 0-7153-8202-0.
- Sherwood, Jennifer; Pevsner, Nikolaus (1974). Oxfordshire. The Buildings of England. Harmondsworth: Penguin Books. pp. 549–550. ISBN 0-14-071045-0.
