= All Saints' Church, Sutton Courtenay =

Coordinates: 51°38′39″N 1°16′19″W

Church of All Saints
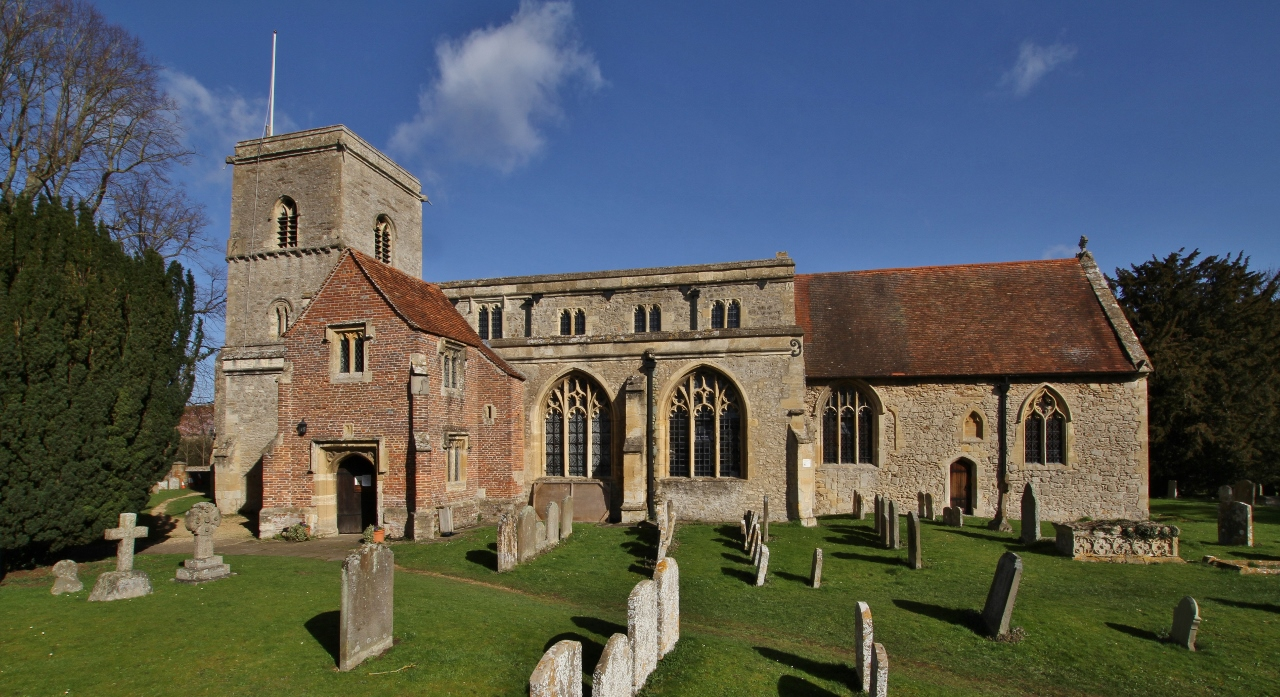
- All Saints' church from the south
- Church of All Saints
- OS grid reference: SU 50485 94194
- Location: Sutton Courtenay
- Country: England
- Denomination: Church of England
- Website: All Saints' Sutton Courtenay

History
- Founded: 12th century
- Dedication: All Saints

Architecture
- Heritage designation: Grade I listed
- Designated: 9 February 1966
- Years built: 12th century

Administration
- Province: Canterbury
- Diocese: Oxford
- Parish: Sutton Courtenay

The Church of All Saints, Sutton Courtenay is the Church of England parish church of Sutton Courtenay in Oxfordshire, England. Extant since at least the 12th century, the church has been Grade I listed since 1966. It is in the centre of the village, near the northeast corner of the village green.

== History and description ==
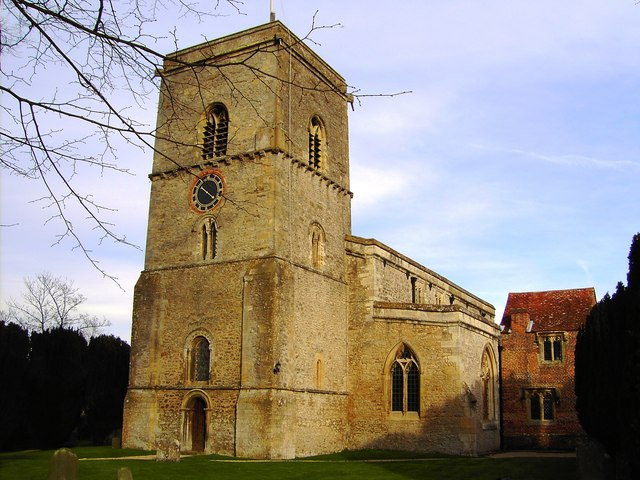
The church from the southwest, showing the west tower and one-handed clock dial

The nave and lower stages of the west tower are late Norman. The font is also Norman, but decorated with a series of pointed arches. The chancel and third stage of the tower are 13th-century. The nave clerestory, north and south aisles and their four-bay arcades are 14th-century additions. The clerestory has five windows on each side. Most are Perpendicular Gothic, but two on the north side are Decorated Gothic. The two-storey brick south porch is early 16th-century. The panelled south door is oak, dating from the same period.

Control of the church at Sutton varied between Abingdon Abbey and the Pope. In 1258 the Abbey leased the church. When Hugh Courtenay inherited the manor he took over the rights from the Abbey.

Around the tower door are marks in the stone believed to be carved by soldiers returning from the Crusades, thanking God for their return. The tower has a clock with a one-handed dial, one of only 22 in England.

The five-bay rood screen is 15th-century. There is a wall painting above the chancel arch of the Stuart royal coat of arms. In 1643, in the English Civil War, gunpowder and munitions stored in the church exploded, shattering windows and damaging part of the tower. The King's coat of arms is believed to have been painted after the restoration of the monarchy in 1660.

Of the church seating, one of the pews is dated 1633. The hexagonal pulpit is Jacobean and was given to the church in 1901.

=== Bells ===
The west tower has a ring of eight bells, ranging in weight from three to 12 hundredweight, and tuned to F major. Richard Keene of Woodstock, Oxfordshire cast the sixth and seventh bells in 1675. Thomas Swain of Longford, Middlesex cast the fourth bell in 1775. Robert II Wells of Aldbourne, Wiltshire cast the third bell in 1787. Robert Taylor cast the fifth bell at his then Oxford foundry in 1829. Mears and Stainbank of the Whitechapel Bell Foundry recast the tenor bell in 1965. There were only six bells in the ring until 1986, when the Whitechapel Bell Foundry cast the present treble and second bells.

== Parish records ==
The parish registers for christenings, marriages and burials cover the years since 1538–39. They are held at the Berkshire Record Office, Reading.

== Churchyard ==
About 33 feet (10 m) south of the chancel is a 15th-century chest tomb decorated with quatrefoil panels. It is a Grade II* listed structure. Also notable is an 18th-century chest tomb about 49 feet (15 m) east of the chancel. It was built for Thomas Dalby, who died in 1734.

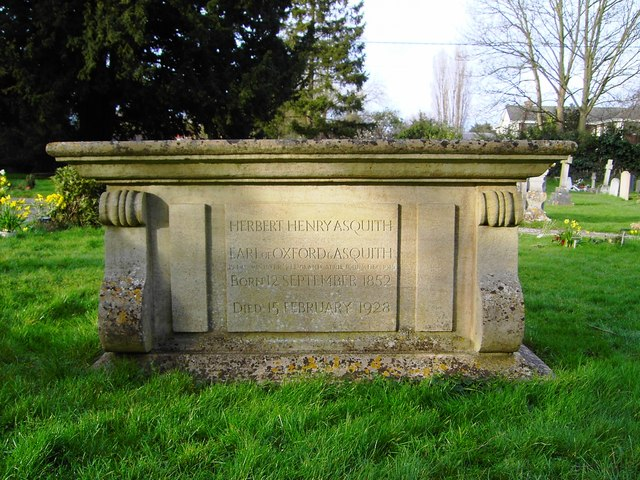
H. H. Asquith's tomb

Notable people buried in the churchyard include H. H. Asquith, Prime Minister of the UK from 1906–1916, and his second wife Margot Asquith, newspaper owner David Astor and novelist George Orwell (under his real name of Eric Arthur Blair). Writer Bill Bryson visited the graveyard, and commented in his book Notes from a Small Island "How remarkable it is that in a single village churchyard you find the graves of two men of global stature."

Asquith, who died in 1928, is buried in a large stone chest tomb south of the chancel. He wanted his grave to be at Sutton Courtenay rather than in Westminster Abbey, and was buried after a simple church service. Margot Asquith was buried with him in 1945.

Orwell is buried in a simple grave, now with a red rose bush growing on it. Orwell had no link with Sutton Courtenay but was a friend of David Astor, who arranged his burial in the village in accordance with Orwell's dying request to be buried "according to the rites of the Church of England, in the nearest convenient cemetery". His body was brought from London and buried on 26 January 1950.

== Sources ==
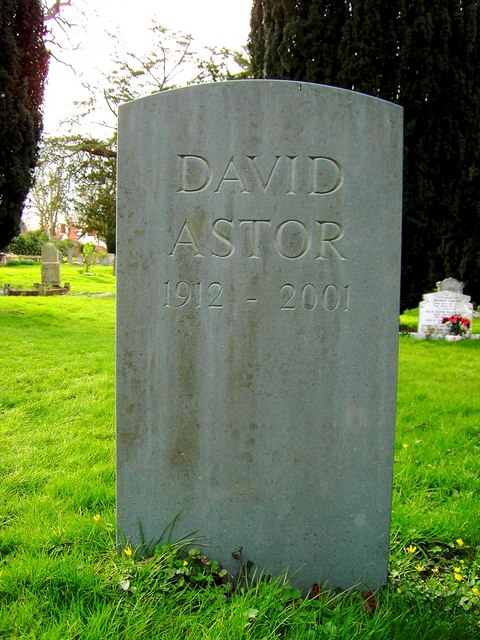
David Astor's grave

- Bryson, Bill (1995). Notes from a Small Island. Ealing: Transworld Publishers. p. 160. ISBN 0-552-99600-9.
- Colls, Robert (2013). George Orwell: English Rebel. London: Oxford University Press. p. 217. ISBN 978-0-19-968080-1.
- Greenwood, Douglas (1990) [1982]. Who's buried where in England. A Constable guide (2nd ed.). London: Constable & Co. pp. 81−82, 257–258. ISBN 0-09-474040-2.
- Harris, Bryan L (2006). Harris's Guide to Churches and Cathedrals: Discovering the Unique and Unusual in Over 500 Churches and Cathedrals. London: Ebury Publishing. p. 122. ISBN 978-0-09-191251-2.
- Page, W; Ditchfield, PH, eds. (1924). "Sutton Courtenay". A History of the County of Berkshire. Victoria County History. Vol. 4. assisted by John Hautenville Cope. London: The St Katherine Press. pp. 269–279.
- Pearson, Lynn F (2004). Discovering Famous Graves. Oxford: Shire Books. p. 92. ISBN 0-7478-0619-5.
- Pevsner, Nikolaus (1966). Berkshire. The Buildings of England. Harmondsworth: Penguin Books. pp. 235–326.
