= John Edward Maurice Midgley =

British biochemist and endocrinology researcher

- Born: 22 February 1935; Burley in Wharfedale
- Died: 9 December 2023 (aged 88)
- Occupation: Scientist
- Years active: 1961–2023

John Edward Maurice Midgley (22 February 1935 – 9 December 2023) was a British scientist, biochemist and researcher in endocrinology. His main scientific focus was on molecular genetics, microbiology, the development of hormone assays and endocrine research. Midgley pioneered modern diagnostic methods for thyroid function.

== Early life and education ==
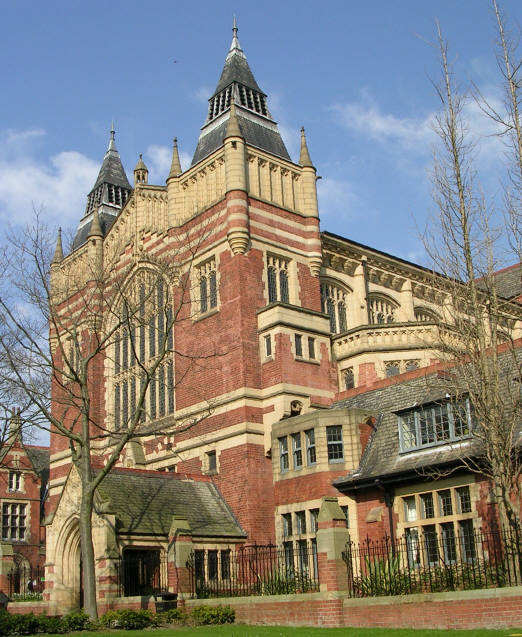
The great hall of the University of Leeds, where Midgley studied biochemistry

Midgley was born in Burley, West Yorkshire, being the only child of Edna (née Clarke) and Maurice Midgley. He received his primary education at Ilkley Grammar School and studied biochemistry at Leeds University, where he graduated with a Bachelor of Science in 1958.

Subsequently, he received a doctorate in physical chemistry at Exeter College, Oxford. His supervisor was the Nobel laureate Cyril Hinshelwood.

== Academic and professional career ==
From 1961 to 1962, Midgley was a fellow in molecular biology at the Carnegie Institution for Science in Washington, D. C. After having returned to Great Britain, he held a lectureship in biochemistry at Leeds University from 1962 to 1967. Subsequently, he took up the position of a lecturer and research fellow in biochemistry and molecular biology at Newcastle University, which he held from 1967 to 1975.

In 1975, he joined Amersham International, a manufacturer of medical products, in Buckinghamshire. There, he developed innovative one-step assay systems for the detection of free thyroid hormones in collaboration with Terry Wilkins. He gained multiple patents and, together with Terry Wilkins, received the Prince of Wales award for industrial innovation and production in 1985.

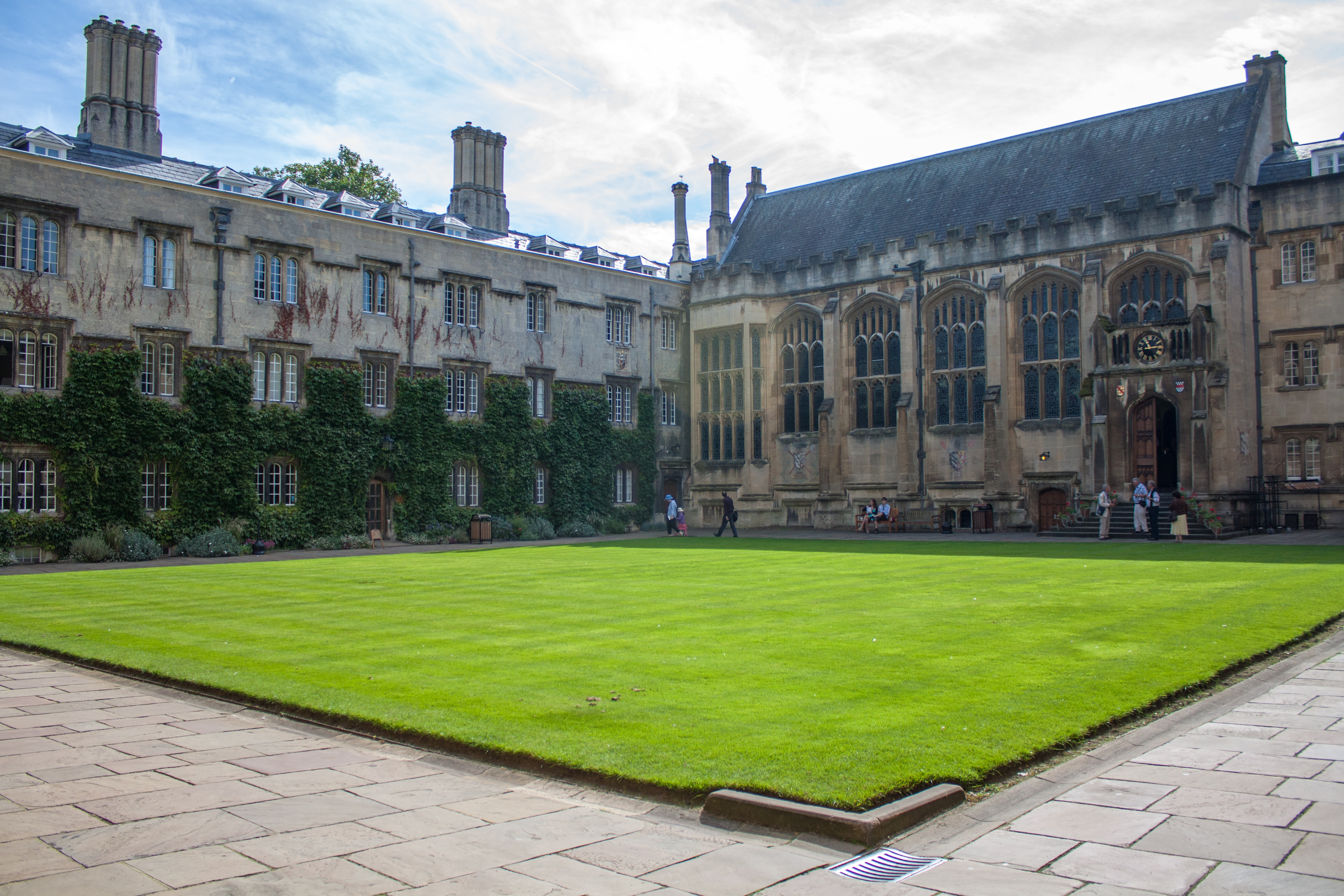
Midgley studied physical chemistry at Oxford.

From 1988 to 1998, he worked as a consultant for diagnostic methodologies, before he joined the Cochrane Collaboration as a Trials Abstractor (1999–2005).

In his later life, he worked in an international study group on the physiology and pathophysiology of thyroid diseases and homeostatic and allostatic mechanisms controlling the function of endocrine organs. Additionally, he devoted himself to advocacy for patients' rights.

== Contributions to science and medicine ==
Midgley's research significantly contributed to medical decision-making and the understanding of thyroid physiology. He authored or co-authored more than 100 peer-reviewed articles and had multiple patents. In 2018, he co-authored the book Homeostasis and Allostasis of Thyroid Function, which explores physiological and clinical aspects of the dynamic regulation of thyroid hormones. His numerous scientific articles addressed the interaction between thyrotropin (TSH) and free thyroxine (FT4), challenging conventional diagnostic approaches and advocating for more personalised patient care.

== Death ==
Midgley died at the age of 88 on December 9, 2023. His wife, Joan, died shortly after him.

== Publications ==
Books

- Hörmann, Rudolf; Midgley, John Edward M.; Dietrich, Johannes Wolfgang Christian (2018). Homeostasis and Allostasis of Thyroid Function. Lausanne: Frontiers Media SA. ISBN 978-2-88945-570-6.

Selected articles

- MIDGLEY, JE; McCARTHY, BJ (26 November 1962). "The synthesis and kinetic behavior of deoxyribonucleic acid-like ribonucleic acid in bacteria". Biochimica et Biophysica Acta (BBA) - Specialized Section on Nucleic Acids and Related Subjects. 61 (5): 696–717. doi:10.1016/0926-6550(62)90053-1. PMID 13935613..
- MIDGLEY, JE (26 March 1963). "The kinetics of transfer ribonucleic acid synthesis in Escherichia coli". Biochimica et Biophysica Acta. 68: 354–64. doi:10.1016/0006-3002(63)90157-4. PMID 13935614.
- Gray, WJ; Midgley, JE (October 1969). "Variations in the average lifetime of bacterial messenger ribonucleic acid with growth medium and temperature". The Biochemical Journal. 114 (4): 63P. doi:10.1042/bj1140063pa. PMC 1185008. PMID 4898916.
- Gray, WJ; Midgley, JE (August 1972). "The control of ribonucleic acid synthesis in bacteria. The synthesis and stability of ribonucleic acids in relaxed and stringent amino acid auxotrophs of Escherichia coli". The Biochemical Journal. 128 (5): 1007–20. doi:10.1042/bj1281007. PMC 1173989. PMID 4566191.
- Wilkins, TA; Midgley, JE (7 August 1982). "Interpretation of free thyroxine radioimmunoassay data". Lancet. 2 (8293): 324. doi:10.1016/s0140-6736(82)90288-4. PMID 6124731.
- Midgley, JE (October 1982). "Methodological background of the Amersham Amerlex free thyroxine RIA". Nuklearmedizin. Nuclear Medicine. 21 (5): 179–83. doi:10.1055/s-0037-1620576. PMID 7155903.
- Allan, DJ; Murphy, F; Needham, CA; Barron, N; Wilkins, TA; Midgley, JE (9 October 1982). "Sensitive test for thyroid hormone autoantibodies in serum". Lancet. 2 (8302): 824. doi:10.1016/s0140-6736(82)92716-7. PMID 6126696.
- Mardell, RJ; Gamlen, TR; Midgley, JE; Wilkins, TA (September 1983). "Free-thyroxin concentration as affected by major illness". Clinical Chemistry. 29 (9): 1702–3. doi:10.1093/clinchem/29.9.1702. PMID 6883699.
- Midgley, JE (June 1993). "The free thyroid hormone hypothesis and measurement of free hormones". Clinical Chemistry. 39 (6): 1342–4. doi:10.1093/clinchem/39.6.1342. PMID 8504547.
- Midgley, JE; Christofides, ND (March 2009). "Point: legitimate and illegitimate tests of free-analyte assay function". Clinical Chemistry. 55 (3): 439–41. doi:10.1373/clinchem.2008.116525. PMID 19147729.
- Midgley, JE (February 2011). ""All that glisters is not gold": Ultrafiltration and free thyroxine measurement With apologies to W Shakespeare". Clinical Biochemistry. 44 (2–3): 151–3. doi:10.1016/j.clinbiochem.2010.11.001. PMID 21074522.
- Hoermann, R; Midgley, JE; Larisch, R; Dietrich, JW (February 2013). "Is pituitary TSH an adequate measure of thyroid hormone-controlled homoeostasis during thyroxine treatment?". European Journal of Endocrinology. 168 (2): 271–80. doi:10.1530/EJE-12-0819. PMID 23184912.
- Midgley, JE; Hoermann, R; Larisch, R; Dietrich, JW (April 2013). "Physiological states and functional relation between thyrotropin and free thyroxine in thyroid health and disease: in vivo and in silico data suggest a hierarchical model". Journal of Clinical Pathology. 66 (4): 335–42. doi:10.1136/jclinpath-2012-201213. PMID 23423518.
- Dietrich, JW; Midgley, JE; Larisch, R; Hoermann, R (December 2015). "Of rats and men: thyroid homeostasis in rodents and human beings". The Lancet. Diabetes & Endocrinology. 3 (12): 932–3. doi:10.1016/S2213-8587(15)00421-0. PMID 26590684.
- Hoermann, R; Midgley, JE; Larisch, R; Dietrich, JW (2015). "Homeostatic Control of the Thyroid-Pituitary Axis: Perspectives for Diagnosis and Treatment". Frontiers in Endocrinology. 6: 177. doi:10.3389/fendo.2015.00177. PMC 4653296. PMID 26635726.
- Dietrich, JW; Landgrafe-Mende, G; Wiora, E; Chatzitomaris, A; Klein, HH; Midgley, JE; Hoermann, R (2016). "Calculated Parameters of Thyroid Homeostasis: Emerging Tools for Differential Diagnosis and Clinical Research". Frontiers in Endocrinology. 7: 57. doi:10.3389/fendo.2016.00057. PMC 4899439. PMID 27375554.
- Hoermann, R; Midgley, JE; Larisch, R; Dietrich, JW (September 2016). "Relational Stability of Thyroid Hormones in Euthyroid Subjects and Patients with Autoimmune Thyroid Disease". European Thyroid Journal. 5 (3): 171–179. doi:10.1159/000447967. PMC 5091265. PMID 27843807.
- Chatzitomaris, A; Hoermann, R; Midgley, JE; Hering, S; Urban, A; Dietrich, B; Abood, A; Klein, HH; Dietrich, JW (2017). "Thyroid Allostasis-Adaptive Responses of Thyrotropic Feedback Control to Conditions of Strain, Stress, and Developmental Programming". Frontiers in Endocrinology. 8: 163. doi:10.3389/fendo.2017.00163. PMC 5517413. PMID 28775711.
- Hoermann, R; Midgley, JEM; Larisch, R; Dietrich, JW (2017). "Recent Advances in Thyroid Hormone Regulation: Toward a New Paradigm for Optimal Diagnosis and Treatment". Frontiers in Endocrinology. 8: 364. doi:10.3389/fendo.2017.00364. PMC 5763098. PMID 29375474.
- Hoermann, R; Midgley, JEM; Larisch, R; Dietrich, JW (October 2018). "The role of functional thyroid capacity in pituitary thyroid feedback regulation". European Journal of Clinical Investigation. 48 (10) e13003. doi:10.1111/eci.13003. PMID 30022470.
- Midgley, JEM; Toft, AD; Larisch, R; Dietrich, JW; Hoermann, R (18 April 2019). "Time for a reassessment of the treatment of hypothyroidism". BMC Endocrine Disorders. 19 (1): 37. doi:10.1186/s12902-019-0365-4. PMC 6471951. PMID 30999905.
- Hoermann, R; Midgley, JEM; Larisch, R; Dietrich, JW (August 2020). "Who is afraid of non-normal data? Choosing between parametric and non-parametric tests: a response". European Journal of Endocrinology. 183 (2): L1–L3. doi:10.1530/EJE-20-0134. PMID 32621583.
- Dietrich, JW; Hoermann, R; Midgley, JEM; Bergen, F; Müller, P (2020). "The Two Faces of Janus: Why Thyrotropin as a Cardiovascular Risk Factor May Be an Ambiguous Target". Frontiers in Endocrinology. 11 542710. doi:10.3389/fendo.2020.542710. PMC 7649136. PMID 33193077.
- Hoermann, R; Pekker, MJ; Midgley, JEM; Larisch, R; Dietrich, JW (2022). "Principles of Endocrine Regulation: Reconciling Tensions Between Robustness in Performance and Adaptation to Change". Frontiers in Endocrinology. 13 825107. doi:10.3389/fendo.2022.825107. PMC 9219553. PMID 35757421.

Selected Patents

- AU patent AU6262780A, John Edward Midgley & Terence Arthur Wilkins, "Free ligand assay", published 1981-04-09, assigned to Amerlite Diagnostics Ltd
- EP patent EP0089806A1, John Cecil Charlton; John Edward Midgley & Terence Arthur Wilkins, "Assay for the free portion of substances in biological fluids", published 1983-09-28, assigned to Amersham International PLC
- ZA patent ZA886068B, Martin Francis Finlan; John Edward Maurice Midgley & Stephen Alexander Charles et al., "Biological sensors", published 1989-04-26, assigned to Amersham Int Plc
- CA patent CA1340536C, John Edward Maurice Midgley; Christopher Peter Sheehan & Nicos Demetriou Christofides, "Method for measuring the free fraction of ligands in biological fluids", published 1999-05-11, assigned to Ortho Clinical Diagnostics Ltd
