= Harry Nursten =

British food chemist

Harry E. Nursten
- Born: August 1927
- Died: 20 December 2011 (aged 84)
- Education: University of Leeds
- Known for: Flavour chemistry
- Scientific career
- Workplaces: University of Reading; University of Leeds; Nottingham Trent University

Harry Erwin Nursten (August 1927 – 20 December 2011) was a British food chemist, specialising in flavour chemistry at the Department of Nutrition and Food Sciences at the University of Reading.

== Biography ==
Harry Erwin Nursten was born in Czechoslovakia in August 1927, son of Sergius Nursten and Helene. The family managed to escape to England shortly before the Second World War. In the 1939 England and Wales Register the parents (“Nursem”) were living at Corringham Court, Golders Green; Sergius was listed as “Dental surgeon (seeking work).” The family settled in Ilkley, Yorkshire, where Harry attended Ilkley Grammar School and gained his Higher School Certificate in 1944. He went to the University of Leeds where he read colour chemistry and dyeing, followed by a PhD in colour chemistry, awarded in 1949.

In the summer of that year Nursten was one of a group of volunteers harvesting at Windlestone Hall. Also there was Jean Frobisher, Harry's fellow student and bridge partner at Ilkley Grammar School, and now a welfare worker. They were married on 23 December 1950 at St Paul's Church, Esholt.

After more research at Leeds, Nursten taught dyeing and textile chemistry at Nottingham Technical College. He returned to Leeds in 1955 as a lecturer in the Procter Department of Leather Science.

Following two sabbaticals at the Massachusetts Institute of Technology and UC Davis, he moved into the area of food and flavour science. In 1976, he was appointed Chair of Food Science at the University of Reading. Following the merger of the National College of Food Technology and the Department of Food Science, he became Head of Department of one of the biggest Food Science Departments in the UK. In 1992, the year he retired, Nursten ensured that the Hugh Macdonald Sinclair endowment was used to set up a new centre for human nutrition research at the University of Reading.

Harry Nursten died in Reading on 20 December 2011. His wife, Jean Patricia Nursten, is a noted Professor of social work, and author.

== Some publications ==
- Nursten, Professor Harry (12 December 1978). "Science of what we eat". Reading Evening Post. p. 12.
- Land, D G; Nursten, H E (1979). Progress in Flavour Research.
- Lane, M J (1983). "The variety of odors produced in Maillard model systems and how they are influenced by reaction conditions". In Waller, G R; Feather, M S (eds.). Maillard Reaction in Food and Nutrition. American Chemical Society.
- Frazier, Richard A; Ames, Jennifer; Nursten, Harry E (2000). Capillary Electrophoresis for Food Analysis: Method Development. Cambridge: Royal Society of Chemistry. ISBN 0-85404-492-2.
- Nursten, Harry (2005). Maillard Reaction: Chemistry, Biochemistry and Implications. Cambridge: The Royal Society of Chemistry. ISBN 0-85404-964-9.
