= Appleford Railway Bridge =

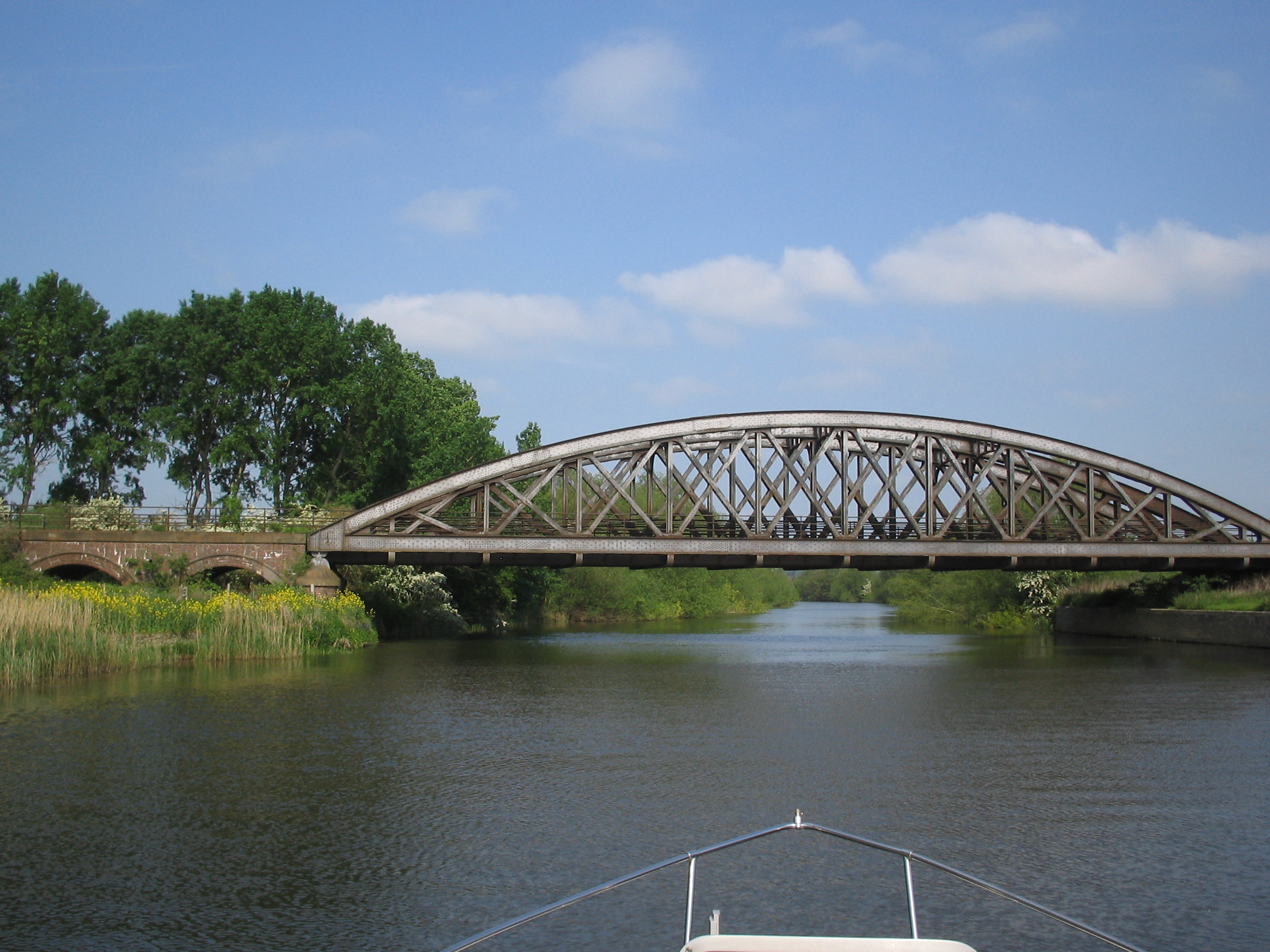
- Appleford Railway Bridge
- Coordinates: 51.6439°N 1.2404°W
- Carries: Cherwell Valley Line
- Crosses: River Thames
- Locale: Oxfordshire
- Maintained by: Network Rail

Characteristics
- Design: Bow and string
- Material: Iron
- Height: 13 feet (4.0 m)

History
- Opened: 1844

Appleford Railway Bridge carries the Cherwell Valley Line from Didcot to Oxford across the River Thames near the village of Appleford-on-Thames, Oxfordshire, England. It crosses the Thames on the reach between Clifton Lock and Culham Lock.

Originally, a timber bridge was built at the approximate location of the present bridge; by December 1843, it was reportedly under construction, and was completed during the following year. By the 1850s, it has been replaced by a more substantial bridge principally composed of wrought iron so that heavier trains could be run along the line. A third bridge was completed in 1927, which was built out of steel; it is this structure that is presently used as of the 2010s.

== See also ==
- Crossings of the River Thames

Next crossing upstream	River Thames	Next crossing downstream
Sutton Bridge (road)	Appleford Railway Bridge	Clifton Hampden Bridge (road)
