= Ilkley Grammar School =

Voluntary controlled academy & specialist school in Ilkley, West Yorkshire, England

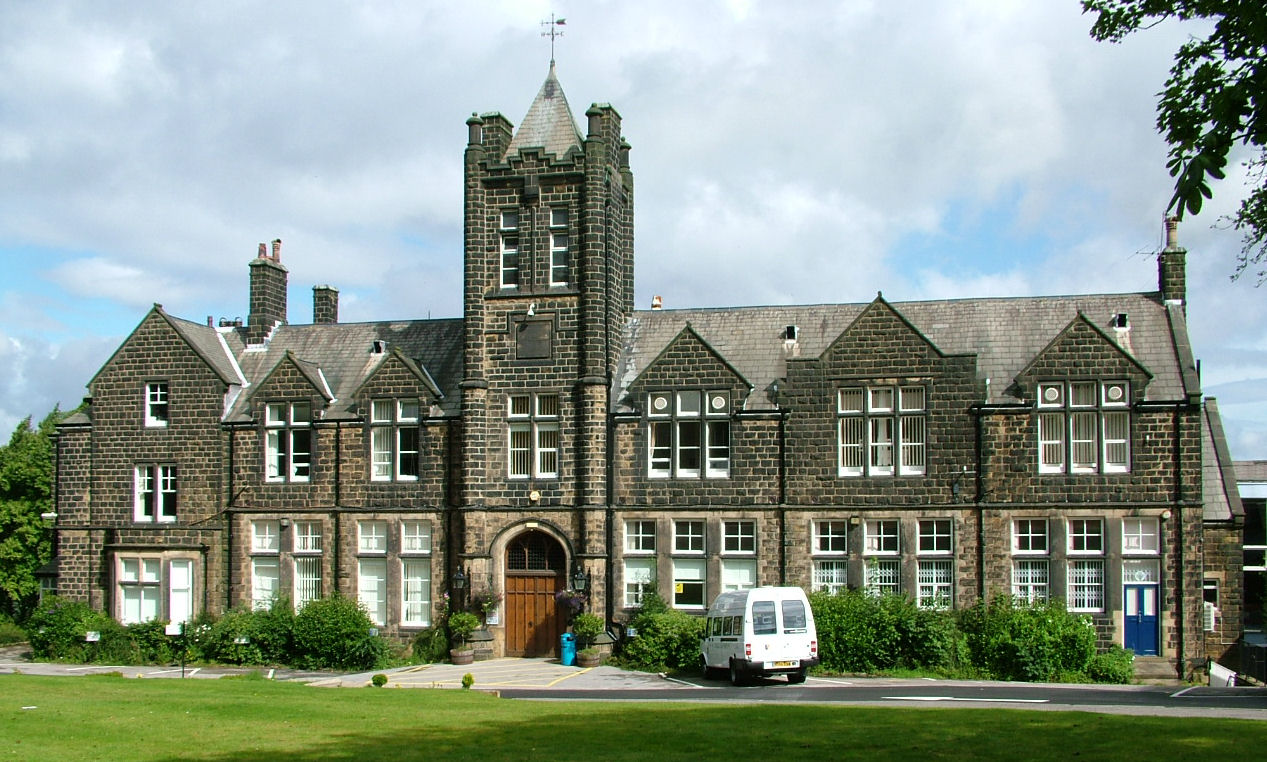
- The school buildings

Location
- Cowpasture Road; Ilkley, West Yorkshire, LS29 8TR; England; 53.922°N 1.814°W

Information
- Type: Academy
- Motto: Sapientia et Statura Proficiamus (Growing in Wisdom and Stature)
- Established: 1607; 419 years ago
- Founder: George Marshal
- Local authority: City of Bradford
- Department for Education URN: 136905 Tables
- Ofsted: Reports
- Headmistress: Carly Purnell
- Staff: c. 90
- Gender: Coeducational
- Age: 11 to 18
- Enrolment: 1602 (sixth form of 348)
- Website: http://www.ilkleygrammarschool.com/

Ilkley Grammar School (IGS) is a co-educational, state comprehensive secondary school in Ilkley, West Yorkshire, England, that specialises in humanities and sciences. In 2011 it gained academy status.

== History ==
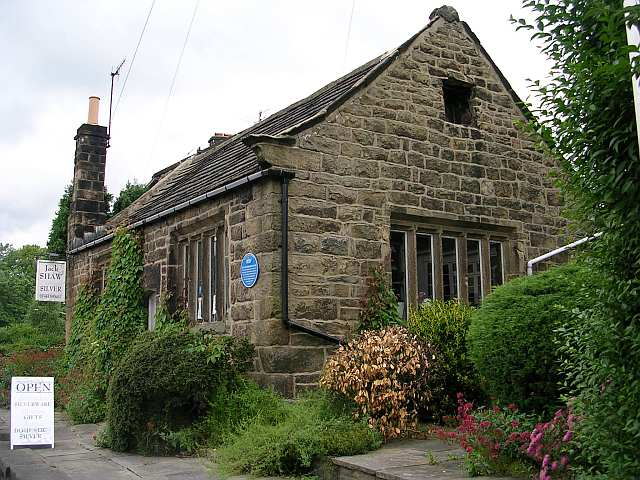
Original Ilkley Grammar School building (1637)

=== Early years ===
The earliest record of a school in Ilkley dates from 1575, with an examination of the religious beliefs of one Constantine Harrison, schoolmaster, by the Church. An endowment of £100 was made by George Marshall in 1601 to fund the salary of a schoolmaster - at the time, one William Lobley. Payments to Lobley were fitful, and the executors of Marshall's estate had to go to law to rectify the situation; the date of settlement of the issues - 1607 - is now taken as the date of origination of the school.

On 2 January 1635, a group of townspeople signed an undertaking to erect a dedicated schoolhouse, and records indicate that by April 1637 such a thing had been built. The building, in Church Street, still exists and is now a listed building, converted into a shop.

A further endowment of £200 was made by Reginald Heber in 1697 - £100 to the school and the same to the parish. However, there were complaints over the next 150 years that the proceeds of the endowments were being diverted by successive vicars of Ilkley to other ends, and that the school was underfunded. Its curriculum, according to a report by the Brougham Commission in 1829, was free tuition in reading English, and the teaching of writing and accounts for a small fee. An 1860 report was more scathing; it alleged that few of the children at the school at that time could write or perform elementary sums; the school building and the admission policy were criticised, and the report concluded that the endowments' requirement for free access to all of the town's children "has done much to hinder the establishment of a good school, either for the poor, or the trading middle class, both of whom are greatly in need of one". The school closed down a short time after this report. Proposals by charity commissioners to restart the school as a fee-paying entity were resisted by the town, and came to nothing.

=== Fee-paying school ===
After the passing of the Elementary Education Act 1870, Ilkley elected to avoid the formation of a school board (which would be entitled to levy rates on the population for the provision of schooling facilities) and instead launched a successful voluntary subscription for the erection of new school buildings, opened in July 1872, and known as the All Saints’ National Schools.

In the same period, under power given in the Endowed Schools Act 1869 to revise the terms and beneficiaries of endowments, a plan was drawn up by an assistant commissioner under the act to divert a number of endowments for the poor of the parish to fund a new school. The plan, for a school for circa 60 boys, paying fees of from £4 to £10 (or up to £40 for boarding), received assent in June 1872. The fruition of the plans was slow; the site of the current school was purchased in 1881 for £2,420, and by 1890 a proposed design for a building estimated to cost £6,500 had been drawn up. Building commenced in 1892; a headmaster - Frederick Swann, head of Chemistry and Physics at the Royal Grammar School, Newcastle, was appointed in April 1893, and the first boys were admitted in December of the same year.

=== Grammar school ===
In September 1939, girls were admitted. Some time after the Education Act 1944 it was established as a county-maintained voluntary controlled secondary school, but retained grammar school status. It was administered by West Riding County Council from Yeadon.

=== Comprehensive ===
In 1970 it became a comprehensive school for ages 13–18. From April 1974 it was administered by the City of Bradford.

== Expansion ==
A number of extensions of the school have subsequently been made. As early as 1898, new classrooms and a gymnasium were constructed. Further classrooms were erected in the 1960s; and a major new building programme added 35 new teaching rooms in 2003.

In the summer of 2010 there are plans to redesign and extend the 6th form centre. There has been a grant put forward and plans drawn up, that include an external 'pod' for students to study in.

The 'pod' was completed in the summer of 2010 with the main structure consisting of three old shipping containers. It doubles as both sixth form area and classroom to teach about renewable energy with the power coming from a wind turbine and solar panels. However the plan to move the pod to the new school site has been abandoned due to the cancellation of the Building Schools for the Future program.

Further minor expansion was also completed in the summer of 2011 with the addition of two new English classrooms in the form of a 'portacabin' this was intended to ease overcrowding as the school intake is expected to continue to increase in the coming years.

In the summer of 2019 a new building was constructed adding 15 new classrooms to the school. In addition to this, the building also added a new cafeteria and conference room. During the construction of this building, the 2 ‘portacabins’ mentioned in the paragraph above were removed in order to create more car parking due to the fact the new building was positioned in such a way that reduced the previous car park size.

== Notable former pupils ==
- Harry Brook (born 1999), professional cricketer
- Ian Dennis (born 1971), BBC sports commentator
- Sir John Lowther, 2nd Baronet, of Whitehaven
- John Edward Maurice Midgley (1935 – 2023), british biochemist and researcher
- Harry Nursten (born 1927 in Czechoslovakia), Professor of Food Science at Reading University
- Rt Rev Michael Turnbull CBE, Bishop of Durham from 1994–2003
- Fiona Williams (born 1947), Professor of Social Policy at the University of Leeds

== Notes ==
- The foundation of Ilkley Grammar School from Ilkley.org Wharfedale's community on the web
- Ilkley Grammar School was closed for a record 4 days commencing on 27 February 2018 and reopened on Monday 5 March due to heavy snowfall from the "Beast from the East". This record was however beaten by the school’s closure throughout much of 2020 due to the Coronavirus pandemic.
