= Hugh Macdonald Sinclair =

British doctor (1910–1990)

Hugh Macdonald Sinclair, FRCP (4 February 1910 – 22 June 1990) was a medical doctor and researcher into human nutrition. He is most widely known for claiming that what he called "diseases of civilization" such as coronary heart disease, cancer, diabetes, inflammation, strokes and skin disease are worsened by "bad fats".

== Early life ==
Hugh Macdonald Sinclair was the third of the four children of Colonel Hugh Montgomerie Sinclair and Rosalie Sybil Jackson. Through his father, he was descended from the Viking monarch of Finland, Woldonius, and the St Clair cousins of William the Conqueror. His great grandfather was the Rt. Hon. Sir John Sinclair Bt MP, founder and President of the British Board of Agriculture, whose second wife was the Hon. Diana Macdonald, the only daughter of Alexander, Lord Macdonald of the Isles. His godfather and cousin was Sir Archibald Sinclair, Viscount Thurso, leader of the Liberal Party and Secretary of State for Air in Winston Churchill's wartime cabinet. His maternal grandfather was Sir John Jackson, the eminent engineer.

Hugh was born in Duddingston House, Edinburgh, Scotland, which was rented from the Duke of Abercorn.

== Education ==
Sinclair followed his older brother, John, to Stone House School and then to Winchester College, where he was from 1923 to 1929, being awarded the Headmaster's Natural Science Prize, 1928, and the Senior Science Prize, 1929.

In that year, he went up to Oriel College, Oxford, to read Animal Physiology, in which he duly achieved a First three years later, when he was appointed Departmental Demonstrator in Biochemistry and then Senior Demy at Magdalen College, Oxford. He won the Gotch Memorial Prize in 1933.

He went on to study Clinical Medicine at University College Hospital Medical School, London, 1933–1936, resulting in the qualifications of Licentiate in Medicine and Surgery of the Society of Apothecaries (LMSSA), Master of Arts (MA), and Bachelor of Medicine, Bachelor of Surgery (BM, BCh), as well as in gold and silver medals. In parallel he was Lecturer in Physiology at University College, London.

He was awarded a Radcliffe Travelling Fellowship, which allowed him to make an extensive visit during the summer of 1937 to many of the laboratories in the US and Canada engaged in nutritional research, but he had to curtail his travels because he had been elected Official Fellow and Tutor in Physiology and Biochemistry at Magdalen College, followed by appointment as University Lecturer and Demonstrator in Biochemistry, 1937–1947.

== Scientific career ==
=== Oxford Nutrition Survey ===
At the beginning of the war in 1939, Sinclair joined a Ministry of Supply team under Professor Rudolph Peters in the Department of Biochemistry, seeking countermeasures to poison gas, but the nutritional status of the population and how to assess it began to occupy Sinclair more and more. Drawing on the assistance of many contacts, Sinclair drew up and submitted proposals for the establishment of what eventually became known as the Oxford Nutrition Survey. The Ministry of Health agreed to the proposals, as did the Regional Medical Council to two local counties. Strong support came from the Rockefeller Foundation, largely through the efforts of Dr Hugh Smith. Eventually Oxford University accepted responsibility for the unit and made Sinclair Director of the Survey.

Data to be collected included anthropometric measurements, clinical assessment, physiological determinations on blood (hemoglobin, clotting time, red and white cell counts, phosphate, total vitamin B1, cocarboxylase, vitamin C, vitamin B_{2}, nicotinic acid), urine (nitrogen, vitamin C, and vitamin B_{1} levels on two samples taken 4 hours apart), and visual dark adaptation.

Sinclair decided that what Sir William Jameson, Chief Medical Officer of the Ministry of Health, would find most useful were "half-page" survey-backed assurances that the indications were that the nation's nutritional status was satisfactory, rather than detailed papers, suitable for submission to recognised peer reviewed scientific journals. This decision led to persistent criticism.

Part of the work of the Oxford Nutrition Survey was carried out by a small mobile team, which was sent to industrial towns, such as Accrington, Merthyr, Chesterfield, and Dundee. Noting Sinclair's experience in organising and managing this work, the Dutch Government in exile invited him to conduct surveys of the nutritional status of the Dutch population affected by the famine of the last months of the war in Europe (see Dutch famine of 1944–45). Following hectic preparations, Sinclair and his team went to the Netherlands as the Nutrition Survey Group SHAEF (Supreme Headquarters Allied Expeditionary Force), just before the German surrender. He found a base in Leiden, where 26,000 biochemical analyses were said to have been carried out in just two weeks. The rapid pace of work of the Oxford team and for their Dutch colleagues was a consequence of the desperate situation. The state of the famine needed to be assessed, treatment and response recorded, and the results set out to inform future action in similar circumstances. In addition, the best treatments needed to be identified and applied.

For his achievements, Sinclair was appointed a Chevalier of the order of Oranje-Nassau by the Queen of the Netherlands.

In 1945 Sinclair was invited to take the mobile laboratories to Düsseldorf, where he set up the headquarters for the Nutrition Survey Group for the British Control Commission. Sinclair again achieved extraordinary feats of organisation, setting up five teams in different cities, under leaders drawn from his colleagues in Oxford and from elsewhere. Sinclair was made an honorary Brigadier and was subsequently awarded the U.S. Presidential Medal of Freedom with Silver Palm.

The Oxford Nutrition Survey was closed formally in 1946 and the Nutrition Survey Group was ended in 1947. Instead of the Department of Human Nutrition, which Sinclair had expected to be able to set up after the war, he was designated Director of the Laboratory of Human Nutrition, which was allocated a few Nissen huts at the Churchill Hospital, Oxford, which had recently been released by the U.S. forces. The Laboratory inherited most of the equipment and some of the staff of the Survey, but not the accommodation. He was appointed as the first University Reader in Human Nutrition in 1951. In 1954, Hans Adolf Krebs succeeded Sir Rudolph Peters as Professor and Head of the Department of Biochemistry, to which the Laboratory was transferred and closed shortly thereafter.

=== Letter to The Lancet ===
In 1956 Sinclair made his most widely known contribution to nutrition in the form of a letter to The Lancet, entitled "Deficiency of essential fatty acids and atherosclerosis, etcetera". The causes of death that had increased most in previous years were lung cancer, coronary thrombosis, and leukemia and Sinclair believed essential fatty acid (EFA) deficiency to be important in all three. EFA deficiency causes extra deposition of cholesterol esters in the epidermis. Sinclair thought the tetraenoic arachidonic acid to be the most important EFA. Its biosynthesis requires vitamin B6. Hardening of fats reduces EFAs and changing to low-extraction flour diminishes the vitamin B6 content. Improvers, such as chlorine dioxide, destroy any EFA present, as well as vitamin E, which would protect it.

The cholesterol thus esterified with abnormal fatty acids is less easily eliminated and so leads to atheroma. Phospholipids containing abnormal fatty acids are also less easily eliminated and so are retained in the plasma and increase the coagulability of blood, thereby contributing to coronary and cerebral thrombosis. The deficiency of normal phospholipids in the epidermis and gut makes their structure faulty and so may contribute to seborrhoeic eczema and peptic ulcers. Similarly, deficiency of normal phospholipids or the presence of abnormal phospholipids in the nervous system leads to defective structure, including demyelination, which would cause multiple sclerosis and possibly mental illness. Deficiency of EFAs may increase susceptibility to X-ray and chemical carcinogens, the former in conjunction with the latter leading to leukaemia and the latter to carcinoma of the bronchus and to the predominance of carcinoma of the stomach in males, the male requirement for EFAs being about five times that of the female.

Much of the letter is speculative and some of the comments are injudicious. Nevertheless, it constituted a landmark and led to correspondence for more than a year. Apart from this paper, in this period, Sinclair had published on a variety of topics, including nutritional deficiency in general and in more specific aspects, such as the relation of deficiencies of vitamin A and essential fatty acids to follicular hyperkeratosis in rats, lesions of mucocutaneous zones in the rat in pyridoxine deficiency, ascorbic acid in hypervitaminosis A in guinea pigs, polycythemia in the rat in pyridoxine deficiency, skin permeability in deficiency of essential fatty acids, vitamin deficiencies in alcoholism, vitamins and the nervous system, and nutritional neuropathy in chronic thiamine deficiency in the rat.

In 1958, the first election period for Sinclair's Readership ended, and he was not reappointed, presumably because his contribution to the traditional scientific literature was judged to be insufficient, in spite of the broad sweep and originality of his thinking.

=== Recognition ===
Sinclair was no longer a member of the Department of Biochemistry, but he continued to tutor at Magdalen and, because of his reputation as an inspiring and entertaining speaker, he was invited to lecture widely. He tried hard to raise support for his research, and for an Institute of Human Nutrition, from his wide circle of contacts, in particular Lord Bossom and through him Lord Woolton, the wartime Minister of Food (1940–1943), but he did not press his case as hard as he might have done, mainly as a consequence of the shock of the death in a car crash of his sister, Catherine. He had already lost his brother to heart disease about 6½ years earlier, in 1954. Lord Woolton died in 1964 and Lord Bossom in 1965.

Sinclair continued to be granted recognition in other ways. Thus he was Cutter Lecturer at Harvard in 1951, Master of the Worshipful Society of Apothecaries for 1967–1968, awarded an Honorary DSc from Baldwin-Wallace College in 1968, Sanderson-Wells Lecturer in London in 1969, and President of the McCarrison Society 1983–1990.

=== Inuit diet experiment ===
Sinclair first wrote about the diet of the Inuit in 1953. In 1966, he lectured in Trondheim, where he renewed his interest. In 1976, he was able to spend some time joining the expedition of Bang and Dyerberg in northwest Greenland, which led to his most widely known experiment, in which he put himself on an Inuit diet, consisting solely of seal, fish (including molluscs and crustaceans), and water for 100 days, starting in March 1979. Many analyses were done: extreme disaggregation of platelets was observed, with bleeding times rising from 3 min to over 50 min, accompanied by spontaneous hemorrhages. (Inuit are known to suffer from nosebleed.) The experiment was a dramatic demonstration of the importance of long-chain fatty acids of fish oils in decreasing the aggregation of platelets and thus the incidence of thrombosis.

=== Subsequent career ===
In 1968, Sinclair was appointed University Lecturer in Biological Sciences at Oxford and, in 1970, Visiting Professor in Food Science at the University of Reading, where he continued to give lectures right up to the year of his death. The text of the most significant of these is incorporated into the book by Walker (1990).

At times, Sinclair entertained hopes that he might found his institute at Nuneham Park, a mansion in extensive grounds, near Oxford, but gradually he realised that the most practical way forward would be to use his home, Lady Place, Sutton Courtenay, also near Oxford, which had been purchased by his mother in 1933.

In 1972, The Memorandum and Articles of Association of The Association for the Study of Human Nutrition Limited were signed, the subscribers being Hugh Sinclair, Francis Aylward, Richard Doll, Arthur Elliott-Smith, David Paton Cuthbertson, Herbert Kay and John Talbot, Solicitor. The association was subsequently registered as a charity. Sinclair became its director. Soon the name was changed to The International Institute of Human Nutrition and later to The International Nutrition Foundation. Lord Porritt was invited to join the council, the composition of which changed over the years:

(c. 1976)	(c. 1992)
Reginald Bennett, MP	Reginald Bennett, MP
David Paton Cuthbertson	John Ledingham
Richard Doll	Richard Doll
Thomas Hunt	Raymond Dils
Michael Perrin	Derek Hockaday
Edward Pochin	David Horrobin
Lord Porritt	Francis Avery Jones
Brian Windeyer	Eric Newsholme
	Harry Nursten
	Keith Taylor
	Martin Vessey
	Lord Wyatt
	Brian Lloyd, Company Secretary

== Hugh Sinclair Unit of Human Nutrition ==
Sinclair had plans drawn up for a substantial institute to be built at Lady Place. It was to incorporate laboratory facilities for fifty workers, together with a lecture theatre, a museum, offices, and a library to house his collection of some 300,000 reprints and books, including those of Sir Robert McCarrison, Surgeon-Captain Thomas L. Cleave , Neil Painter, Hugh Trowell, and Cicely Williams. Much of his time was occupied in trying to raise funds, but the operation of the institute in the temporary accommodation arranged at Lady Place was heavily dependent on personal financial donations from Sinclair. He left his entire estate to the Foundation.

The Council of Management decided not to assume direct responsibility for the development of research at Lady Place, but to see whether a university would wish to further Sinclair's aspirations by founding a chair in Human Nutrition. Accordingly, proposals were invited and a panel of international experts in nutrition was appointed to assess the relative merits of the proposals submitted. In the final round, there were three contenders: Oxford Brookes University, the University of Oxford, and the University of Reading. The last proved successful and, in due course, the Foundation was wound up and the Hugh Sinclair Unit of Human Nutrition was established at the University of Reading. In 1995, Christine Williams was appointed as the first Hugh Sinclair Professor and the appointment of other staff followed swiftly.

The above account of Hugh Sinclair's life and achievements has been largely based on the publications of Ewin (2001) and Gale and Lloyd (1990).

== Lady Place ==
The mock-Tudor mansion Lady Place in Sutton Courtenay, the Sinclair home, was used by the University of Reading after Sinclair's death in 1990. It was destroyed in a fire on 28 August 1998; a local man was subsequently cleared of arson charges. An estate of houses was built on the site in 2000, with a half-timbered apartment block occupying the location of the mansion.

== Primary sources ==
- Ewin, J., Fine Wines & Fish Oil, the Life of Hugh Macdonald Sinclair, Oxford University Press, 2001.
- Gale, M., and Lloyd, B. (ed.), Sinclair, Dr Hugh Macdonald Sinclair, DM, DSc, FRCP, the McCarrison Society, Wokingham, 1990.
- R.W. Johnson, Look Back in Laughter: Oxford's Golden Postwar Age, Threshold Press, 2015.
- Walker, A. F. (ed.), Applied Human Nutrition for Food Scientists and Home Economists, Ellis Horwood, Chichester, 1990.
