= Clifton Hampden Bridge =

Bridge in Oxfordshire, England

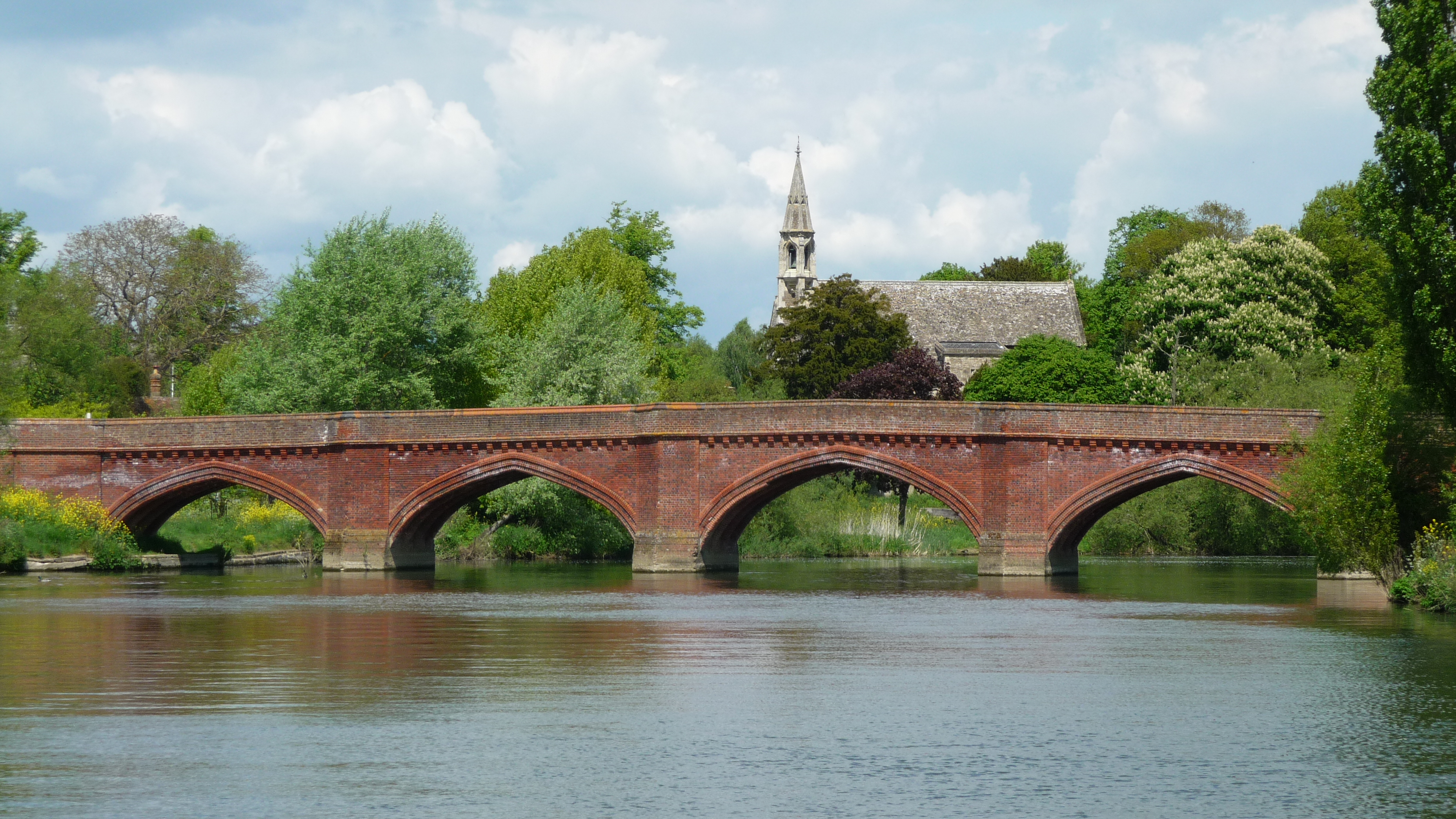
- Clifton Hampden Bridge
- Coordinates: 51°39′16.5″N 1°12′38″W
- Carries: Thames Path, Road
- Crosses: River Thames
- Locale: Clifton Hampden, Oxfordshire
- Maintained by: Oxfordshire County Council
- Heritage status: Grade II* listed

Characteristics
- Design: Arch
- Material: Brick
- Height: 13 feet 5 inches (4.09 m)
- No. of spans: 6
- Piers in water: 5

History
- Designer: George Gilbert Scott
- Opened: 1867

Location
- Interactive map of Clifton Hampden Bridge

Clifton Hampden Bridge is a road bridge crossing the River Thames in Clifton Hampden, Oxfordshire, England, situated on the reach below Clifton Lock. Originally it joined Oxfordshire on the north bank with Berkshire on the south but in 1974 the area on the south bank was transferred from Berkshire to Oxfordshire. It is a Grade II* listed building.

Clifton Hampden Bridge was designed by Sir George Gilbert Scott and opened in 1867. The bridge replaced a ferry service which had operated on the site since at least the early 14th century. From its opening a toll was payable but this ceased in 1946 when the County Councils of Berkshire and Oxfordshire joined to buy the bridge from its private owners.

== Background ==
The reach at Clifton Hampden was rocky and shallow, with water levels often dropping to barely 2 feet (0.61 m) so it was usually fordable by cattle and horses. The earliest record of a ferry is a mention of John Broun being ferryman in the early 14th century. The archives of Exeter College, Oxford show that Clifton Ferry was given to the college in 1493 by a Watlington draper called Roger Roper; the college owned the ferry right up until 1861 when it was bought out in preparation for the building of the bridge. In 1607 a ferry at Clifton is mentioned as the downstream limit of improvement works undertaken by the 1605 Oxford-Burcot Commission. In Thomas Baskerville's travel journal of 1692 he notes "At Clifton fferry [sic] is a great boat to carry horse and man" whilst an 1829 tour notes "an ancient ferry" with a "boat passing continually to and fro".

The events that led to the building of the bridge started in August 1826 when the Lord Mayor of London made a ceremonial progress down the Thames from Oxford to London. The Mayoral barge grounded on the rocky outcrops in the shallows at Clifton Ferry and was stuck for several hours whilst the weirs further upstream were opened to raise the water level. This episode led to the building of Clifton Lock and weirs in 1835 which allowed better water management on the reach. Whilst the deeper channel was welcomed by river traffic it prevented the fording of the river by herds of cattle and thus prompted demands for a bridged crossing.

== Present structure ==
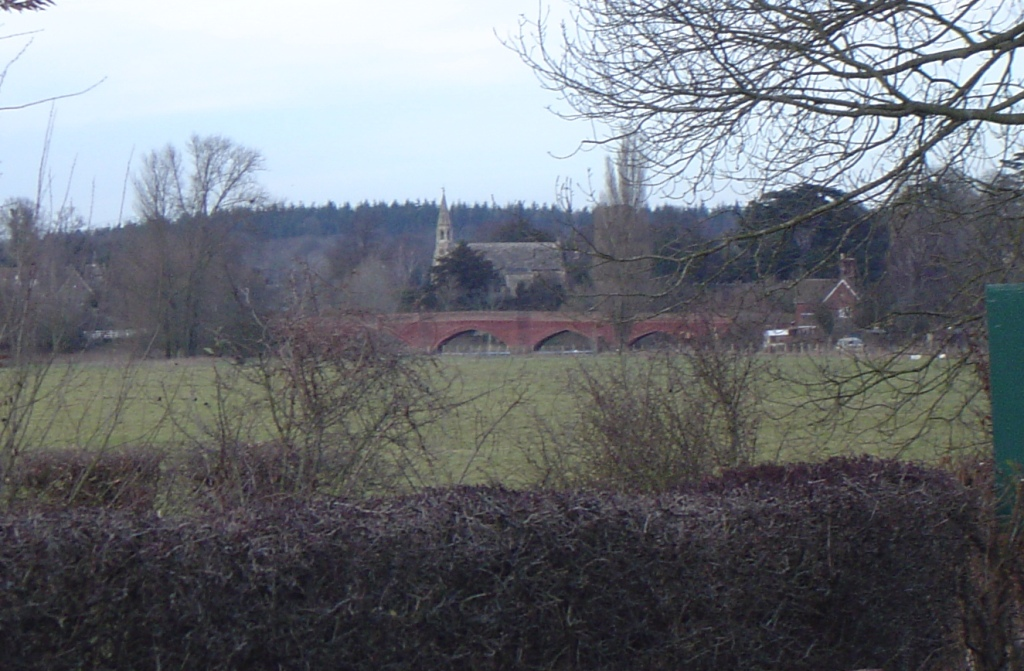
The bridge and village from Clifton Lock upstream

The driving force behind the building of the bridge was Henry Hucks Gibbs, a banker, businessman and Governor of the Bank of England. Gibbs inherited the Lord of the Manor of Clifton Hampden on the death of his father in 1842 and devoted time and money to modernising the estate. He built new estate cottages, a new manor house, renovated and restored the Church of St Michael and All Angels as well as building the bridge.

Clifton Hampden Bridge Act 1864
- Act of Parliament
- Parliament of the United Kingdom
- Long title: An Act for the making and maintaining a Bridge over the River Thames or Isis, near the Ferry at Clifton Hampden in the County of Oxford, with Approaches thereto; and for other Purposes.
- Citation: 27 & 28 Vict. c. xliv

Dates
- Royal assent: 23 June 1864

In 1861 Gibbs purchased the ferry rights from Exeter College and applied for permission to build a bridge. This was granted in an act of Parliament, the Clifton Hampden Bridge Act 1864 (27 & 28 Vict. c. xliv) of 23 June 1864, stating the "local and public advantage" of linking Clifton Hampden with the Parish of Long Wittenham and granting the right to levy a toll. Gibbs selected George Gilbert Scott as the architect for all his improvements and a popular story, possibly apocryphal, tells how Scott drew the initial design for the bridge on his starched shirt-cuff over dinner with Gibbs.

The bridge was built of red brick supplied from a kiln that Gibbs had built on Clifton Heath to service his other modernisations. Scott's design has six gothic arches with spans from 24 feet (7.3 m) to 34 feet (10 m). The five brick piers have triangular cutwaters which extend upwards to provide pedestrian refuges. The total cost of the construction was £3,617 (equivalent to £350,000 today) which was met by Gibbs, the unusually low tolls being levied only to meet the cost of ongoing maintenance. The bridge opened in 1867 with its builder, Richard Casey, as toll keeper.

In 1931 the bridge was nearly demolished as part of Berkshire County Council's policy of replacing toll bridges. New plans for a steel beam and trestle bridge were drawn up but the intervention of the Second World War put the plans on hold. In 1946 the Councils of Oxfordshire and Berkshire purchased the bridge from Lady Aldenham for £1,850 (£67,000) and decided to retain Scott's brick structure. On 4 October 1946 the bridge was made free, the first vehicle to cross being a fairground caravan.

== See also ==
- Crossings of the River Thames

Next bridge upstream	River Thames	Next bridge downstream
Appleford Railway Bridge	Clifton Hampden Bridge; Grid reference SU5472395382	Little Wittenham Bridge
Next crossing upstream	Thames Path	Next crossing downstream
northern bank Abingdon Lock	Clifton Hampden Bridge; Grid reference SU5472395382	southern bank Day's Lock
