= Sutton Pools =

Backwater on the course of the River Thames, England

Coordinates: 51°38′48″N 1°16′21″W

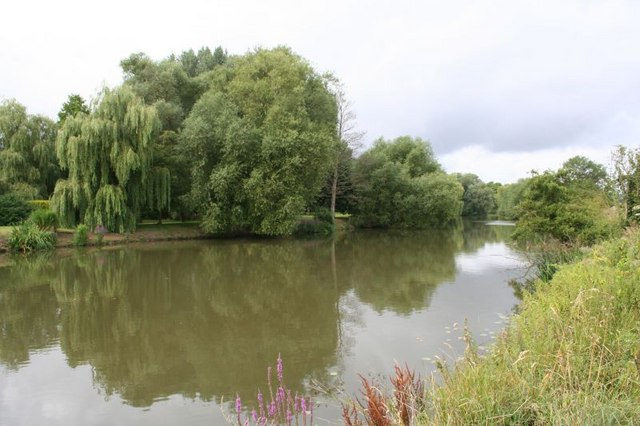
Sutton Pools in 2009

Sutton Pools are a picturesque backwater formed by a number of weirs, islands, footbridges and barriers on the course of the River Thames at Sutton Courtenay, Oxfordshire, England. The higher level of the river is separated from the lower pools by a causeway which dates from Saxon times. This river stretch ceased to be the main navigable route after Culham Cut was constructed in the early 19th century, which also created an island to the north of the Pools. In addition there are three smaller islands, linked by footbridges over the weirs, part of a footpath between Sutton Courtenay and the village of Culham.

The upper river channel at Sutton Pools used to pass beneath a paper mill, though this closed in 1897 and has been demolished. The river route is blocked by a fence here as it passes through the gardens of Mill House. A wooden footbridge and kissing gate lead to the main village.
