= Eric Newsholme =

- Born: 19 May 1935; Liverpool
- Died: 17 March 2011 (aged 75); Torquay, Devon, England
- Education: Magdalene College, Cambridge
- Known for: Biochemistry for the Medical Sciences (with Tony Leech, 1983)
- Scientific career
- Fields: Biochemistry (human metabolism)
- Institutions: Merton College, Oxford; Biochemistry Department, University of Oxford
- Doctoral advisor: Philip Randle
- Other academic advisors: Hans Krebs

Eric Arthur Newsholme (19 May 1935 – 17 March 2011) was a biochemist who specialised in human metabolism. He was a fellow of Merton College, Oxford, from 1973 until his retirement in 1995, and published a number of seminal textbooks and research papers.

== Life and career ==
Newsholme was born in Liverpool on 19 May 1935, and was brought up in the city's West Derby suburb. In 1955, he went up to Magdalene College, Cambridge, to read Natural Sciences, and then to study for his PhD degree in Biochemistry under the supervision of Philip Randle. In 1961, he published his first full paper in the Biochemical Journal (on the regulation of glucose uptake by muscle, co-authored with Philip Randle). This was to be followed by more than 100 papers published in that journal; around 20 of these have gone on to be recognized as seminal papers by the research community.

After completing his doctorate, in 1964 he moved to the University of Oxford as a researcher with Sir Hans Krebs. In 1973, he was made a fellow of Merton College, Oxford, and a lecturer at the Department of Biochemistry, where for the next 22 years he trained PhD degree students and postdoctoral scientists in research techniques in his laboratory.

Newsholme married Pauline Anderson in 1959; they had a son and two daughters, six grandchildren and two great-grandchildren. He was a lifelong fan of Liverpool Football Club. He took up marathon running in his mid-30s, and successfully completed around 40 marathons.

He died in Torquay, South Devon, on 17 March 2011.

== Publications ==
- Regulation in Metabolism (with C. Start, 1973)
- Biochemistry for the Medical Sciences (with Tony Leech, 1983) - updated as Functional Biochemistry in Health and Disease (with Tony Leech, 2010)
- Keep on Running (with Tony Leech and Glenda Duester, 1994)
