= Sutton Bridge, Oxfordshire =

Sutton Bridge
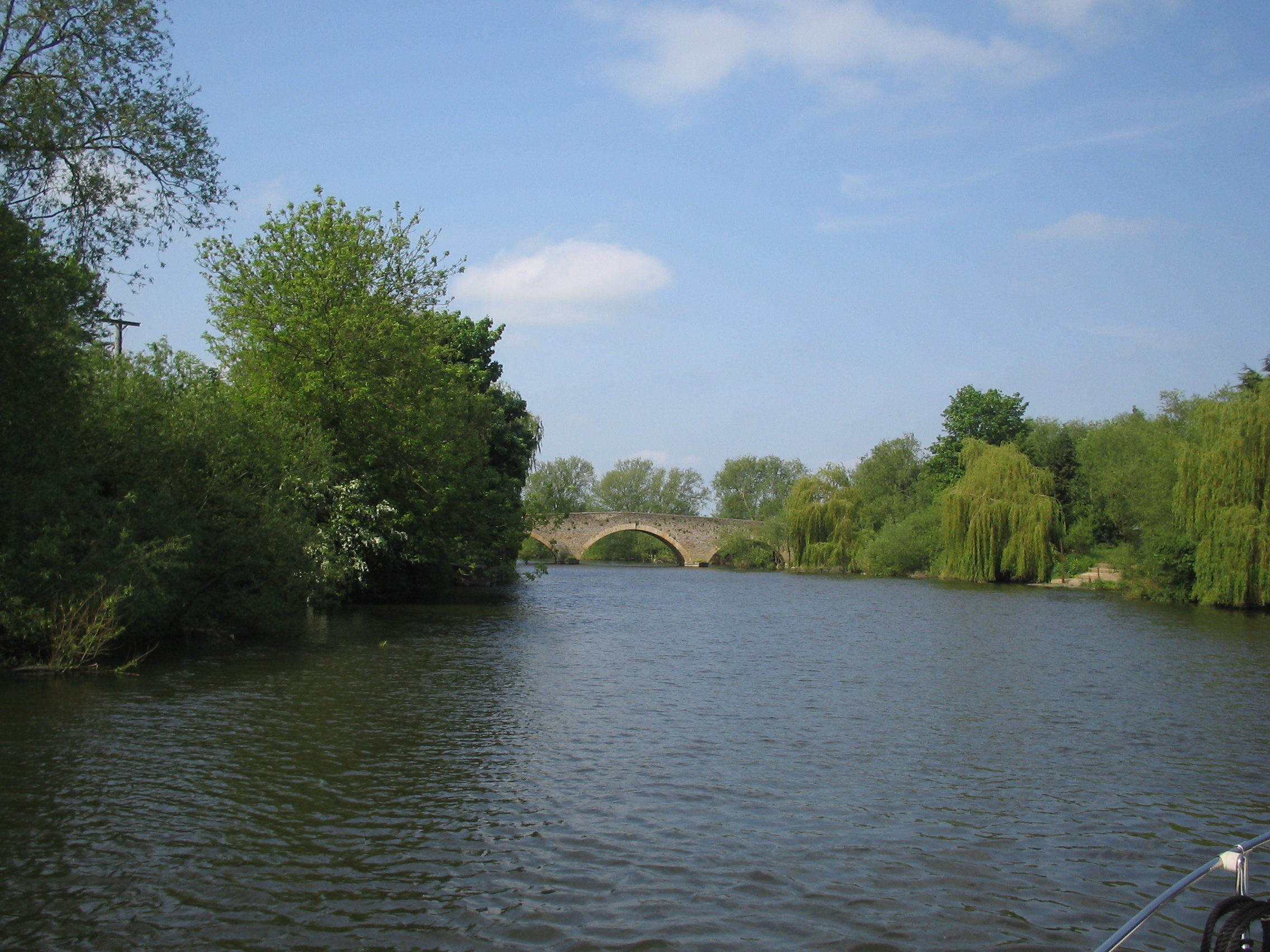
- Sutton Bridge
- Coordinates: 51.649923°N 1.265848°W
- Carries: Minor road
- Crosses: River Thames
- Locale: Sutton Courtenay, Oxfordshire
- Maintained by: Oxfordshire County Council
- Heritage status: Grade II listed

Characteristics
- Design: arch
- Material: Stone
- Height: 14 feet 9 inches (4.50 m)
- No. of spans: 5 & 1
- Piers in water: 2

History
- Opened: 1807

Location
- Interactive map of Sutton Bridge

Sutton Bridge is a road bridge across the River Thames near the village of Sutton Courtenay, Oxfordshire, England. It is a stone structure built in 1807 with three arches over the main river and two smaller ones across the flood plain. An extension was built in 1809 across the Culham Cut, just below Culham Lock. It was originally a toll bridge and replaced an earlier multi-arch bridge over the original weir and a ferry at this site. It is a Grade II listed building.

== See also ==
- Crossings of the River Thames

Next bridge upstream	River Thames	Next bridge downstream
Abingdon Bridge	Sutton Bridge	Appleford Railway Bridge
