= Sutton Courtenay =

Village in Oxfordshire, England

Coordinates: 51.642°N 1.276°W

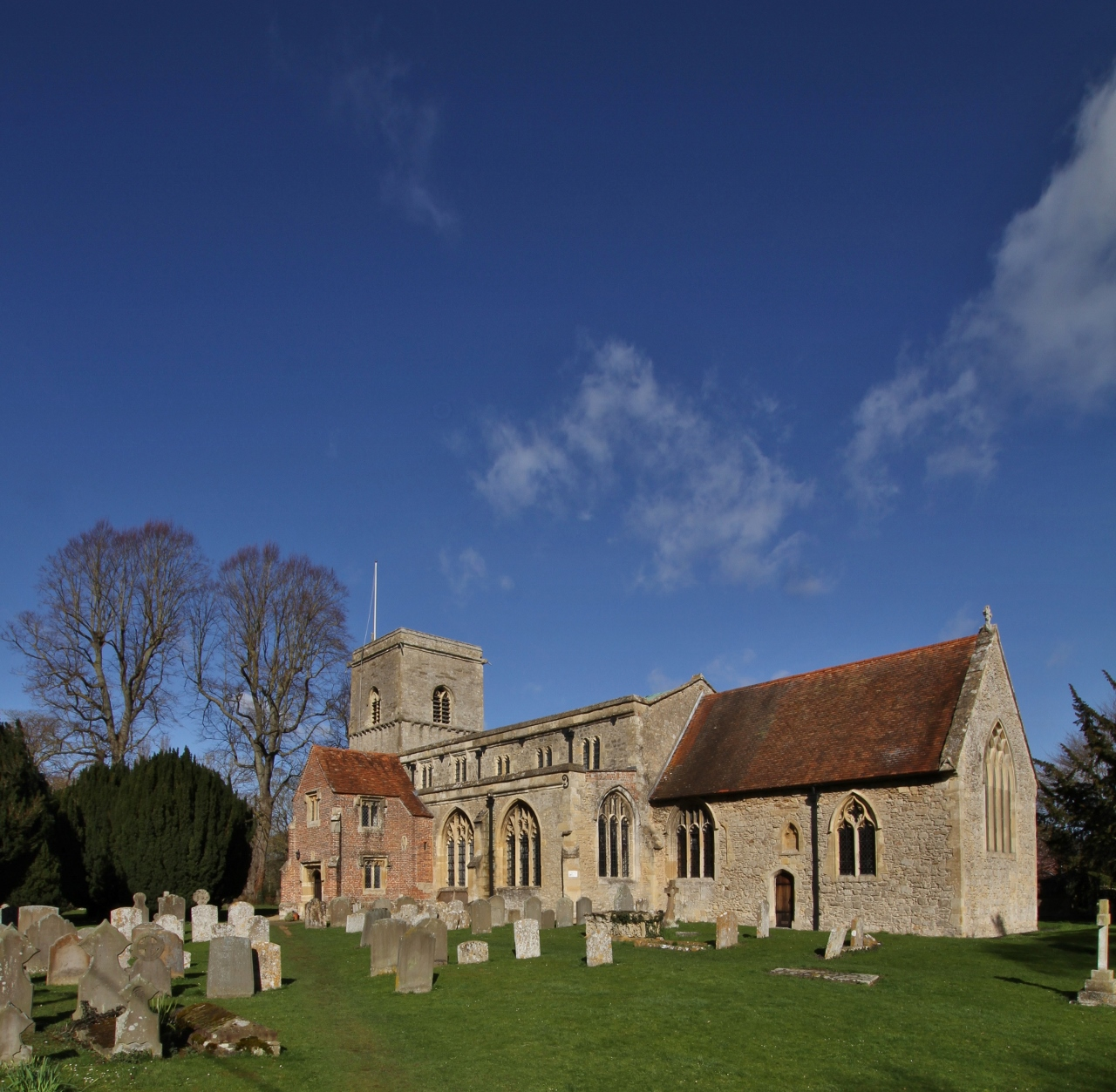
- All Saints' parish church

- Location within Oxfordshire
- Population: 2,421 (2011)
- OS grid reference: SU5094
- Civil parish: Sutton Courtenay
- District: Vale of White Horse
- Shire county: Oxfordshire
- Region: South East
- Country: England
- Sovereign state: United Kingdom
- Post town: Abingdon
- Postcode district: OX14
- Dialling code: 01235
- Police: Thames Valley
- Fire: Oxfordshire
- Ambulance: South Central
- UK Parliament: Didcot and Wantage
- Website: Sutton Courtenay Parish Council

Sutton Courtenay is a village and civil parish in the Vale of White Horse district of Oxfordshire, England. It is situated on the south bank of the River Thames 2 miles (3 km) south of Abingdon-on-Thames and 3 miles (5 km) northwest of Didcot. The 2021 census recorded the parish's population as 3,055, a rise from 2,421 in 2011.

Historically part of Berkshire until 1974 boundary changes, Sutton Courtenay is home to some important structures, such as the Abbey, the Manor House, All Saints' Church, a twelfth-century Norman hall, the Sutton Bridge, and Didcot power station.

== Archaeology and history ==
A Neolithic stone hand axe was found at Sutton Courtenay. Petrological analysis in 1940 identified the stone as epidotised tuff from Stake Pass in the Lake District, 250 miles (400 km) to the north. Stone axes from the same source have been found at Abingdon, Alvescot, Kencot and Minster Lovell. Excavations have revealed rough Saxon huts from the early stages of Anglo-Saxon settlement of Britain, but their most important enduring monument in Sutton was the massive causeway and weirs that separate the millstream from Sutton Pools. The causeway was probably built by Saxon labour. In 2010 the Channel 4 Time Team programme excavated a field in the village and discovered what they then thought was a major Anglo-Saxon royal centre with perhaps the largest great hall ever discovered in Britain.

Written records of Sutton's history began in 688 when King Ine of Wessex endowed the new monastery at Abingdon with the manor of Sutton. In 801 Sutton was made a royal vill, with the monastery at Abingdon retaining the church and priest's house. It is believed that this was on the site of the Manor in Sutton Courtenay and where Alfred the Great was married in 868. The Domesday Book of 1086 shows that the manor of Sudtone ("south" of Abingdon) was owned half by William I and farmed mainly by tenants who owed him tribute. There were three mills, 300 acres (120 ha) of river meadow (probably used for dairy farming) and extensive woodlands where pigs were kept.

Most historians believe that Matilda, the elder of the two legitimate children of Henry I of England, was born in Winchester; however John M. Fletcher argues for the possibility of the royal palace at Sutton (now Sutton Courtenay) in Berkshire; the queen had been delivered of a child that died, and it seems likely that she stayed for the birth of Matilda the following year. Sutton became known as Sutton Courtenay after the Courtenay family took residence at the Manor in the 1170s. Reginald Courtenay became the first Lord of Sutton after he had helped negotiate the path of the future king, Henry II, to the throne.

Sutton Courtenay was involved in the marriage of Maud Holland in the 1360s. Edward the Black Prince agreed with Hugh de Courtenay, 2nd/10th Earl of Devon that Maud would marry Devon's grandson Hugh Courtenay. Devon promised to award Maud an annuity of 200 marks and the manors of Sutton Courtenay and Waddesdon in Buckinghamshire. In return Edward promised to pay Devon four lots of 1,000 marks at 6-monthly intervals. The arrangements received papal dispensation from Pope Urban V and the approval of the English king, the Black Prince's father, Edward III. The wedding had taken place by February 1365, when the manors were granted to Maud.

== Industry and economy ==
In the past agriculture, a local paper mill (employing 25 people in 1840) and domestic service were major sources of employment in the village. The Didcot power stations are in Sutton Courtenay parish. Didcot A power station closed and the de-commissioning process began on 22 March 2013. Also in the parish are several large quarries that have been used for gravel extraction and then used for landfill taking domestic refuse from London via a rail terminal. Now the main employers include local scientific establishments and Didcot Power Station. There are many commuters using Didcot railway station, London being 45 minutes away. At one time Amey plc had its head office in Sutton Courtenay. In 2003 Amey had been in financial trouble and was bought by Spain's largest construction firm, Ferrovial Servicios. At the time it employed about 400 people at Sutton Courtenay.

== Recent events ==
In August 1998 the Tudor Revival mansion Lady Place, former home of nutritionist Hugh Macdonald Sinclair, was destroyed by fire. On 30 January 2008 there was an explosion and fire at Sutton Courtenay Tyres and petrol station, which led to about 100 nearby houses being evacuated for fears that acetylene cylinders might explode. On 23 February 2016 a large section of the former boiler house at Didcot A power station collapsed while the building was being prepared for demolition. Four demolition workers were killed and five others were hospitalised.

== Buildings ==
=== Manor houses ===
In the Norman era, the oldest surviving buildings of the village were built. The Norman Hall is one of the oldest buildings in the village, being built in about 1192 in the reign of Richard I. Across the road from the Norman Hall is The Abbey, actually the former rectory. Its 14th-century Great Hall has an arched oak roof. The Manor House was formerly known as Brunce's Court when it was the home of the Brunce family, one of whom, Thomas Brunce, became Bishop of Norwich. It is a five-gabled, two-winged house which has had many additions over the centuries but originated as the great medieval royal hall, frequented by King Henry I and then taken over by the Courtenay family, who gave their name to the village. All Saints' parish church was also built at this time (see below), and is a fine example of local Norman and Medieval architecture.

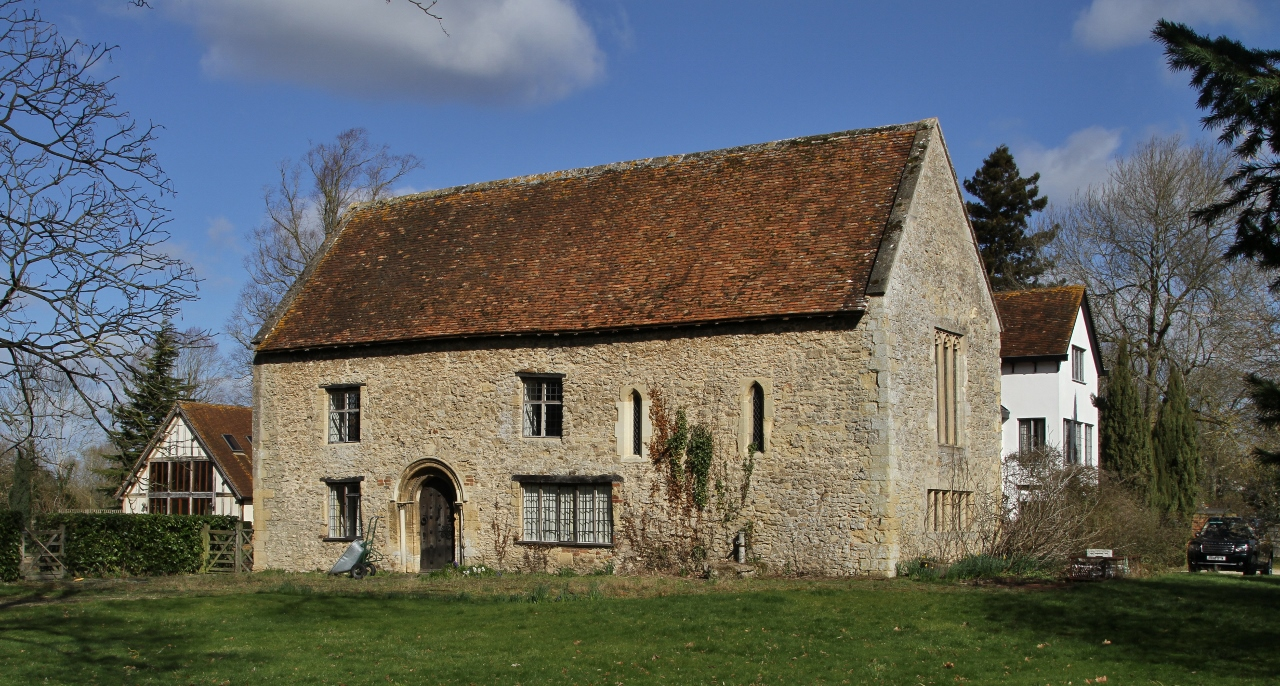
The Norman Hall in Church Street

=== The Abbey ===
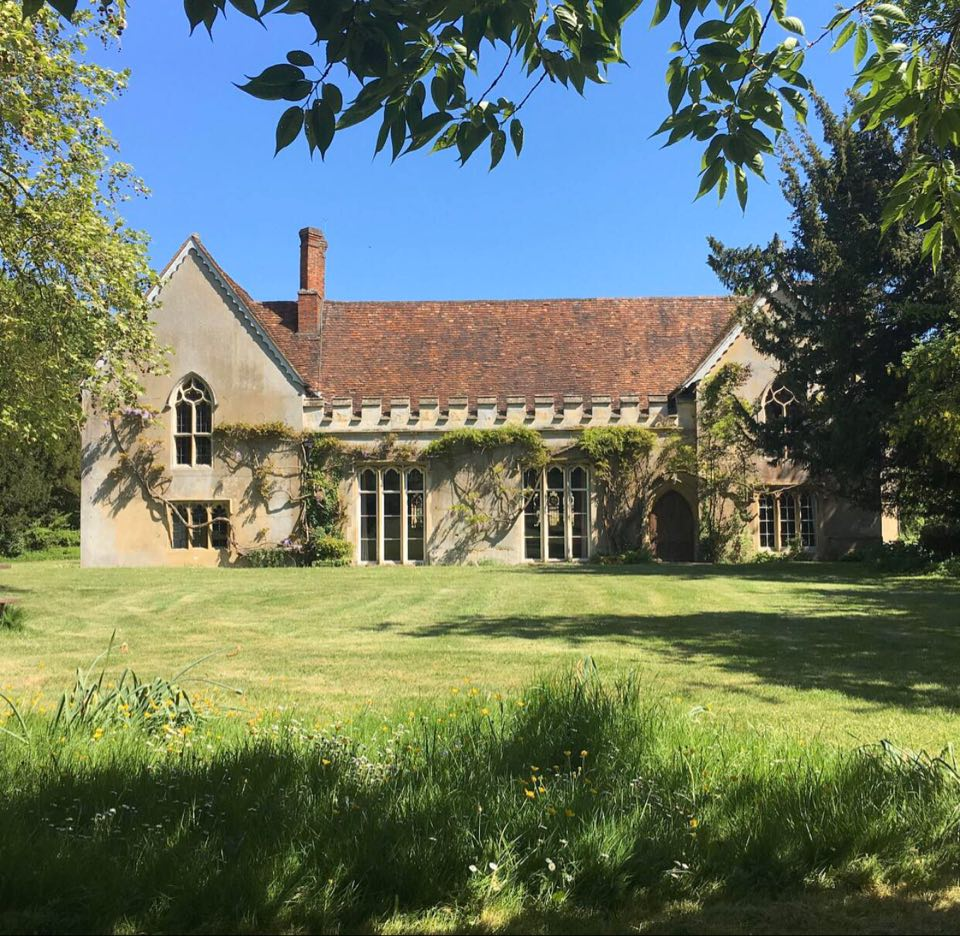
The Abbey, a medieval courtyard house and former rectory

The Abbey is a medieval courtyard house, across the road from the Norman Hall and the Manor House, which has been recognised by Historic England as a building of outstanding historic and architectural interest. It is considered to be a 'textbook' example of the English medieval manor house, and is a Grade I-listed building. The Abbey has its origins in the 13th century as a rectory of Abingdon Abbey. Several construction phases took place during the Middle Ages, carried out by prominent figures like Solomon of Rochester, Thomas Beckington and William Say, but it wasn't until the 17th century that the current plan was completed. It was probably during the Victorian era that the house acquired the name 'The Abbey'. From 1495 to 1867, The Abbey was in possession of St George's Chapel at Windsor Castle, who leased the estate among others to John Fettiplace.

After being inhabited by Evelyn St. Croix Fleming, the estate was bought by David Astor in 1958, who leased it to the Ockenden Venture which offered sanctuary to refugees and displaced children. In the 70s, The Abbey was lent to the exiled Bishop Colin Winter to house the Namibia International Peace Centre. In 1978, the Astor family sold the house and in 1980 it came into possession of The New Era Centre, a charity which use it as a spiritual retreat and conference centre.

=== Prime Minister's home ===
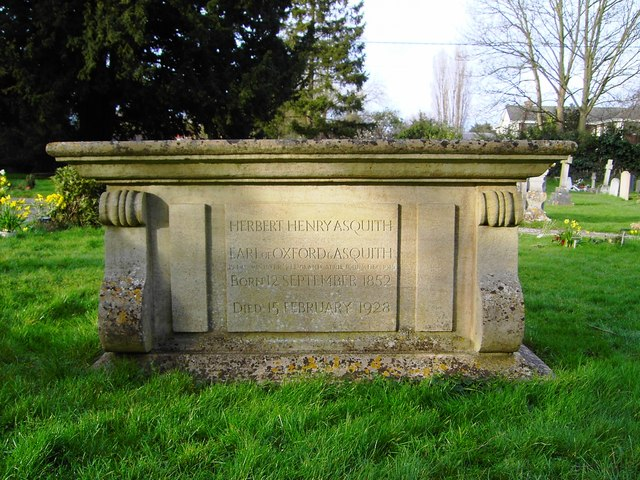
H. H. Asquith's grave in All Saints' parish churchyard

In 1912 the then Prime Minister, H. H. Asquith, chose The Wharf (which he built in 1913) and the adjoining Walton House for his country residence. Asquith and his large family spent weekends at The Wharf where his wife Margot held court over bridge and tennis. She converted the old barn directly on the river which served for accommodation for the overflow of her many weekend parties. A painting of the period by Sir John Lavery (now in the Hugh Lane Gallery in Dublin) shows Elizabeth Asquith and her young friends lounging in boats by the riverside. Asquith signed the declaration that took Britain into the First World War here. The house has a blue plaque in honour of Asquith. He and his family remained in the village after he resigned as Prime Minister. He is buried in All Saints' parish churchyard (see below).

=== All Saints' parish church ===
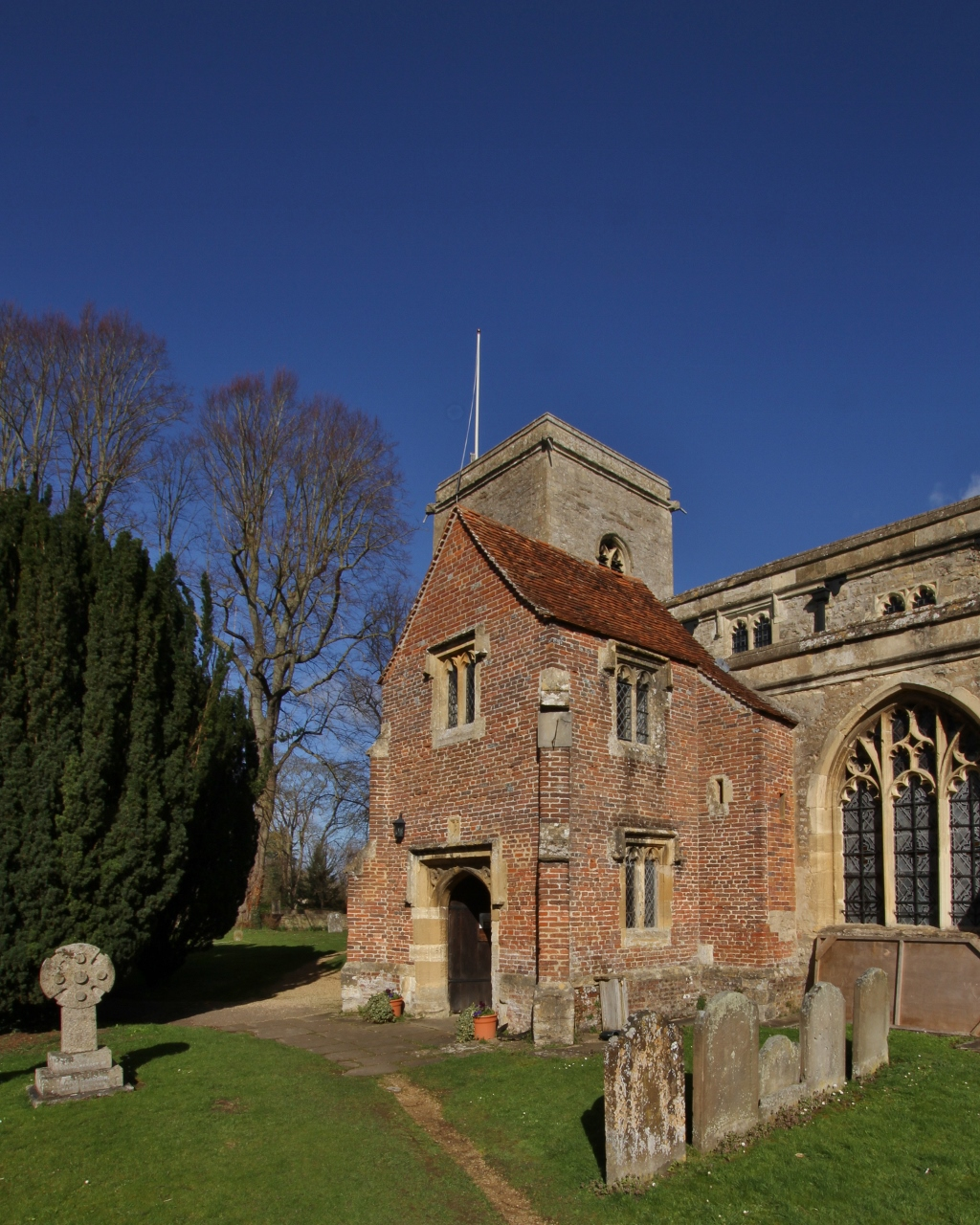
15th-century south porch and parvise of All Saints' parish church

The earliest parts of All Saints' parish church include the 12th-century Norman west tower and responds of the chancel arch. The most easterly arch of the south arcade is pointed but has zig-zag ornament. On the tower door are crusader crosses inscribed by soldiers either hoping for or giving thanks for a safe return from the Crusades. The main south door has a brick south porch and parvise built with money left to the poor of the parish by Thomas Bekynton. Other fittings include a 17th-century wineglass pulpit, a carved mid-12th century font with fleur-de-lys pattern and three late 14th-century misericords. The church was nearly destroyed during the Civil War when munitions stored by the Parliamentarian vicar exploded in the church.

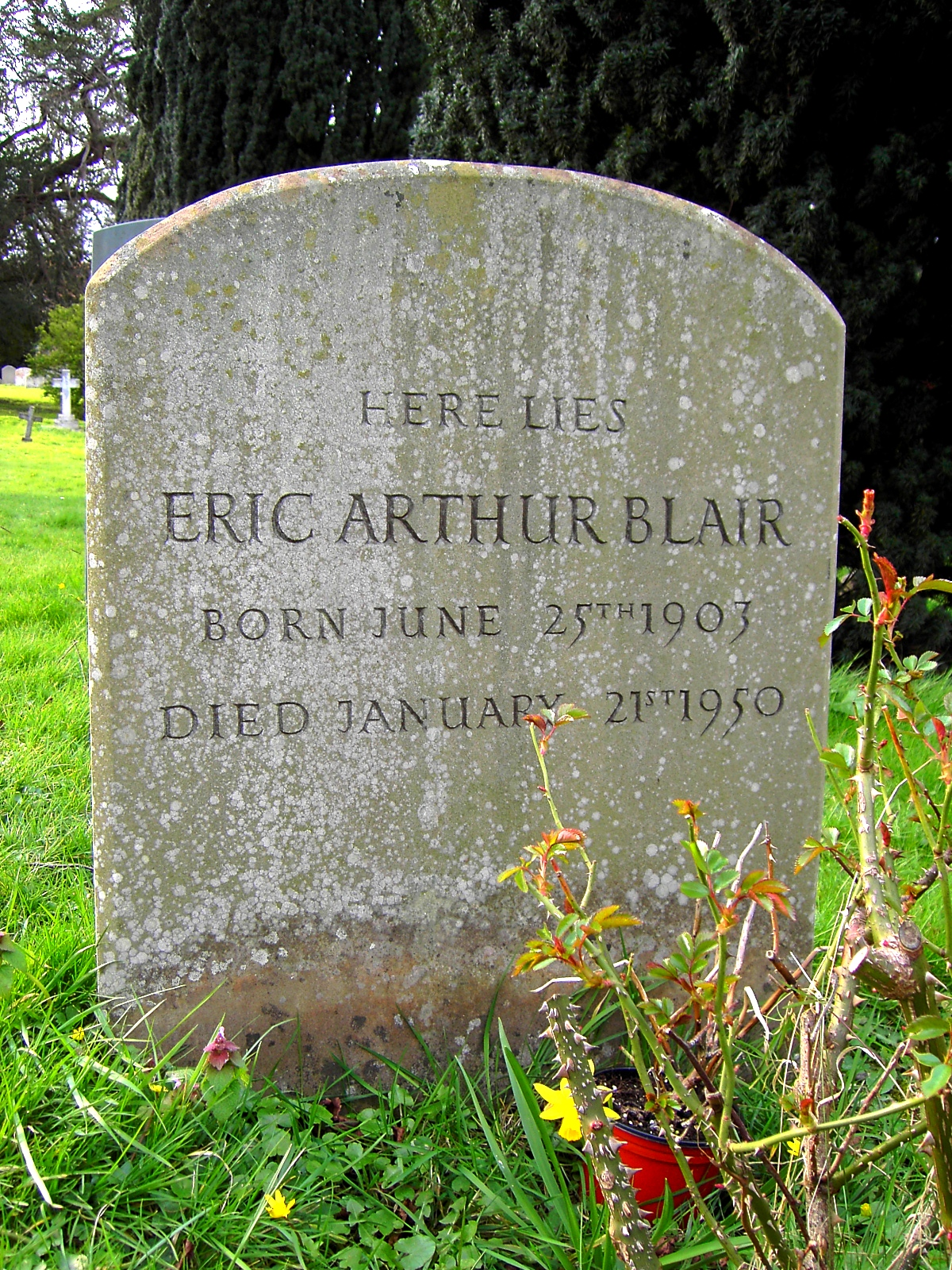
George Orwell's headstone in All Saints' parish churchyard, showing his birth name

The churchyard is the burial place of Eric Arthur Blair (1903–50), better known by his pen name George Orwell. As a child he fished in a local stream. He requested to be buried in an English country churchyard of the nearest church to where he died. However, he died in London, and none of the local churches had any space in their graveyards. Thinking that he might have to be cremated against his wishes, his widow asked her friends whether they knew of a church that had space for him. David Astor was a friend of Orwell and was able to arrange his burial in Sutton Courtenay, a "classic English country village" as Orwell had specifically requested, as the Astor family owned the manor of Sutton Courtenay. With approval from the local vicar and encouragement from Malcolm Muggeridge, arrangements were made. The churchyard also contains the graves of David Astor, Horace Freeland Judson and H. H. Asquith, Earl of Oxford and Asquith. Asquith so much loved the simplicity of the village that he chose to be buried there rather than in Westminster Abbey.

== Notable people ==
- H. H. Asquith, Prime Minister and Earl of Oxford, lived in The Wharf as his country home
- Margot Asquith, socialite, wife of prime minister, and countess
- David Astor, newspaper publisher, lived at the Manor House, restored The Abbey
- Franta Belsky, Czech sculptor, lived and worked in the village
- Thomas Bekynton, Bishop of Bath and Wells but earlier Rector of All Saints' parish church
- Eric Arthur Blair (George Orwell), buried in the churchyard
- Robert Burchfield, chief editor of the Oxford English Dictionaries between 1971 - 1984
- Thomas Brunce, 15th-century Bishop of Norwich, who grew up in Sutton Courtenay where his father was Lord of the Manor, then known as Brunce's Court
- Tim Burton and Helena Bonham Carter bought the Mill House in 2006, which was previously leased by her grandmother, Violet Bonham Carter, and owned by her great-grandfather H. H. Asquith
- Jacques Goddet, organiser of the Tour de France, went to school here
- Empress Matilda, 12th-century "Lady of the English" and claimant of the throne of England, may have been born at the Manor House
- Hugh Macdonald Sinclair, nutritionist, lived at Lady Place in the village.
- Miles Thomas, manager Wolseley Motors, Morris Motors, chairman BOAC.
- Joseph Mallord William Turner, artist, may have sketched around the Sutton Courtenay riverbank.

== Sources ==
- Currie, Christopher Richard John (1992). "Larger Medieval Houses in the Vale of White Horse" (PDF). Oxoniensia. 57: 81–224.
- Harden, DB (1940). "The Geological Origin of Four Stone Axes Found in the Oxford District" (PDF). Oxoniensia. V. Oxford Architectural and Historical Society: 165.
- Page, W; Ditchfield, PH, eds. (1924). "Sutton Courtenay". A History of the County of Berkshire. Victoria County History. Vol. IV. assisted by John Hautenville Cope. London: The St Katherine Press. pp. 369–379.
- Pevsner, Nikolaus (1966). Berkshire. The Buildings of England. Harmondsworth: Penguin Books. pp. 235–237.
- Yurdan, Marilyn (2010). Oxfordshire Graves & Gravestones. Stroud: the History Press.
- Zeuner, FE (1952). "A group VI neolithic axe from Minster Lovell, Oxfordshire". Proceedings of the Prehistoric Society. XVIII (2). Cambridge University Press for The Prehistoric Society: 240–241. doi:10.1017/s0079497x00018387. ISSN 0958-8418. S2CID 129713280.
