= Abingdon Rowing Club =

Rowing club in Oxfordshire

- Location: Abingdon-on-Thames, Oxfordshire, England
- Coordinates: 51.661303°N 1.283265°W
- Home water: River Thames, Abingdon Lock
- Founded: 1958
- Affiliations: British Rowing boat code - ABN
- Website: www.abingdonrc.org.uk

Events
- Abingdon Spring Head of the River

Abingdon Rowing Club is a rowing club on the River Thames based on Wilsham Road in Abingdon-on-Thames, Oxfordshire, England.

The club's home water is the stretch of the upper Thames between the Abingdon and the Culham locks. The total rowable length of this water stretch is approximately 4 km (3900m).

The official club colours are teal-green and gold in accordance with the Abingdon coat of arms. The club badge logo features region peculiar Sika deer winged and above the Abingdon bridge arch holding the two lightnings representing Culham and Harwell science campuses, honouring the academics and professionals who largely constituted and contributed to Abingdon Rowing Club.

== History ==
The club was founded in 1958 and has produced multiple British champions since.

=== Early days ===
A rowing club had existed in Abingdon in the middle of the 19th century with limited success until the club was disbanded in 1878. The old club organised a yearly rowing race on the Abingdon stretch of the Thames with a sculler trophy originating from 1868 that is still in use by Abingdon R.C.

The current club was re-established on 26 June 1958 in the Bear Room of the Abingdon Guildhall with the formation of a small club committee consisting of Alderman C. G. Barber and Fitzgerald O'Connor as chairman. Rowing activity commenced immediately through generous help from Abingdon Boys School Boat Club, which donated the first shell and a set of blades bought from Oxford City. The first competition appearance of the new Abingdon R.C. was on 2 August 1958 at St Neots regatta, where Abingdon won its first race against Crowland rowing club but lost in the final against Nottingham University.

=== Development years and boathouse ===
After initial success at British rowing competitions in 1958 and 1959, the club was stagnating in the 1959/1960 season because of the lack of a proper boathouse. In late 1959 the first modest Abingdon R.C. boathouse, named 'The Nissen Hut', was erected at the corner of the Abbey Meadows island. 1961 also saw the inauguration of the renewed Abingdon Head of the River Race, which became a popular annual event. By 1964 the club had achieved steady growth, winning three consecutive Oxford City Bumps (1961, 1962, 1963). At the beginning of 1964, Abingdon town and Vale of White Horse region decided to further develop Abbey Meadows with a public swimming pool, hotel and new residential block, meaning the rowing club had to relocate. The new location for the clubhouse was at Wilsham Road, next to the Army ground and sailing club. A new boathouse was built with the help of government funding in mid-1965. The club has been based in the Wilsham Road clubhouse ever since. The clubhouse has seen many additions and improvements, lastly at the beginning of the current century through the National Lottery funding. The current clubhouse consists of three hangar bays (doubles/pairs bay, singles bay and large boats 8s and 4s bay), modern men's and women's changing rooms with showers and bathrooms, a kitchen with dining and TV room, and a gym with weight room and rowing machines section.

Since the mid-1960s to early 1990s, the club has had steady success, winning in multiple boat classes across junior and senior categories for men and women at national regattas and the British Rowing Championships.

=== Current times ===
Since beginning of the current century and popularity of Masters rowing (known as Veterans in Great Britain until 2010) the Masters age groups within the club grew to become the second largest age category after the Juniors. Abingdon R.C. has also continued with an average success in its primary senior rowing although with only occasional appearances on Head of The River Race and Henley Royal Regatta. The club has had more success in recent time at British Rowing Championships (Junior and Masters), Henley Masters regatta and lately at FISA World Rowing Masters Championships.

== Abingdon Head of the River ==
Abingdon Spring Head of the River is a rowing time-trial race event held annually in mid-April on the river Thames in Abingdon. The competition was founded in 1961 by the Abingdon Rowing Club and traditionally it is the last head race event of the season in British Rowing competition calendar before BR regatta season commences. The inaugural Abingdon Head of the River Race was organised under Ron Stovold's secretaryship. The event immediately gained in popularity. Initially designed for fours racing shells, the event quickly became the second-largest time trial event for the fours in the UK. Subsequently, multiple boat classes and categories have been added to the event. Nowadays Abingdon Spring Head covers all boat classes across the whole range of age categories from Juniors aged 13 to Masters-I aged 85. As the event is held in mid-April with longer daylight and summer daylight-saving time, it accommodates four divisions and allows a full day of rowing racing for 360 crews. Historical trophies are presented to the winners of selected traditional challenges of the Abingdon Spring Head:

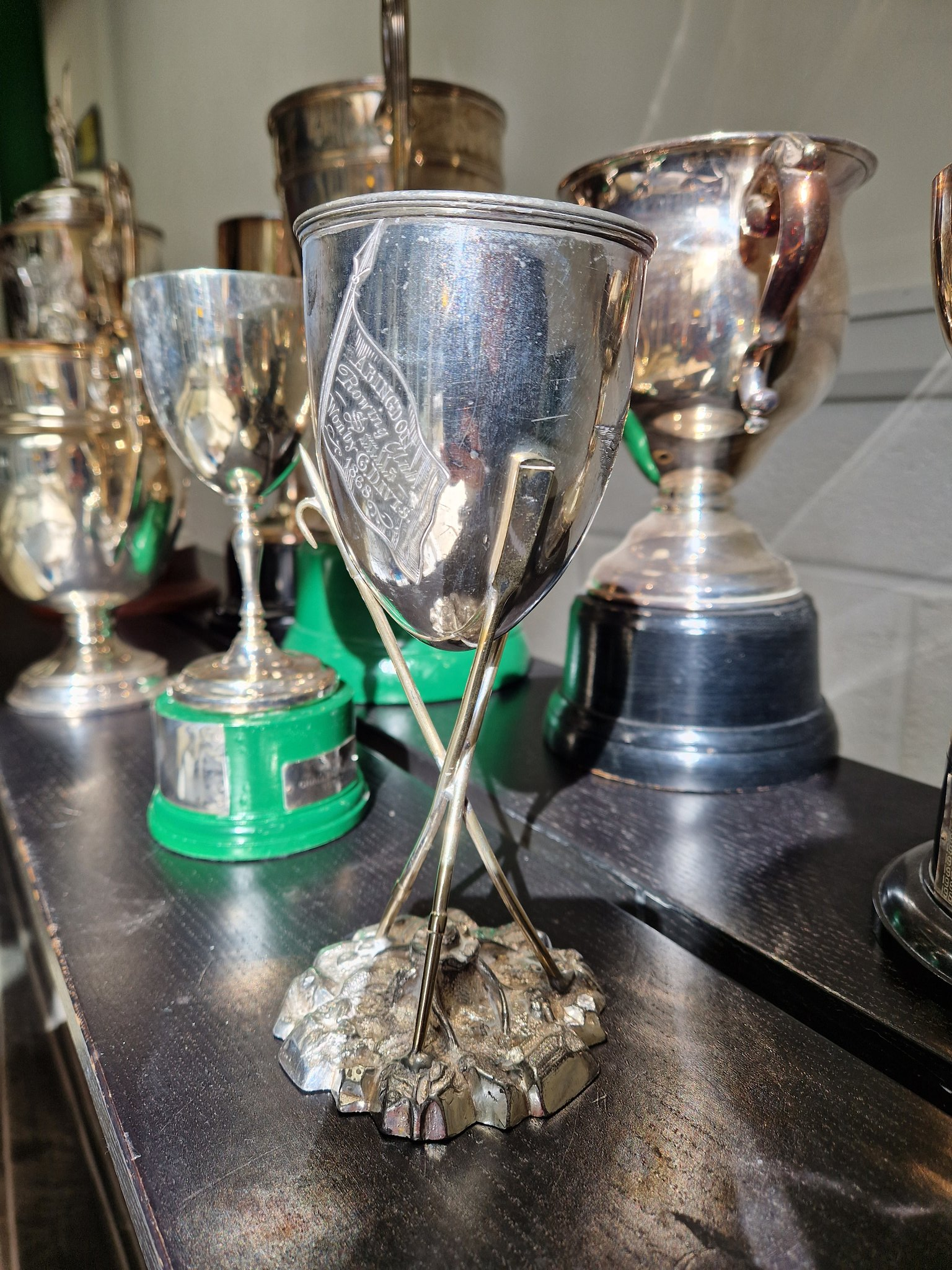
Abingdon Head Traditional Trophies

=== Abingdon Head course ===
Abingdon Head is raced on a 2 km upstream course on the River Thames stretch from Culham reach to the St. Helen's church in Abingdon. The start line is approximately 150m below the Culham cut bifurcation and "Danger" sign. From the start the race heads north towards the Abingdon town centre with west river bank on the Sutton Courtenay side and the east on the Culham side. After first 1000m, the course goes into an S-band near Abingdon Marina, with the final 750m through Abingdon town between the Abingdon school boathouse and St. Helen's church.

=== Abingdon Head trophies ===
- The Abingdon Head of the River Race Challenge Cup from 1963 is presented to the fastest crew of the day
- The Abingdon Rowing Club Sculls Trophy from 1868, the historical trophy retained from the 19th-century club, is presented to the fastest sculler of the day.
- The Buckler Cup from 1985 is presented to the fastest women's crew of the day.
- The Milton Challenge Cup from 1962 is presented to the fastest junior women's crew of the day.
- The Sechi Challenge Cup is presented to the fastest junior crew.
- The Fred Hart Memorial Trophy is presented to the fastest women sculler.
- The Pete Burden Trophy is presented to the fastest junior sculler.
- The R F Wilson Trophy is presented to the fastest female junior sculler.

== Honours ==
Abingdon RC - British champions:
Year	Winning crew
1974	MJ2-, MJ4x, MJ162x
1975	MJ2x
1976	MJ2x, WJ4+
1977	M1x, MJ8+ composite
1978	WJ4+
1980	MJ4+ composite
1982	MJ2+ composite, WJ4+ composite
1983	JW2 - composite
1984	W2 - composite

Key: O open, *M men, W women,8 +coxed, -coxless, x sculls, c composite, L lightweight

=== Notable rowers ===
- Maggie Lambourn (GB international)
- Ian Marriott (senior national champion)

== See also ==
- Rowing on the River Thames
