= Culham Bridge =

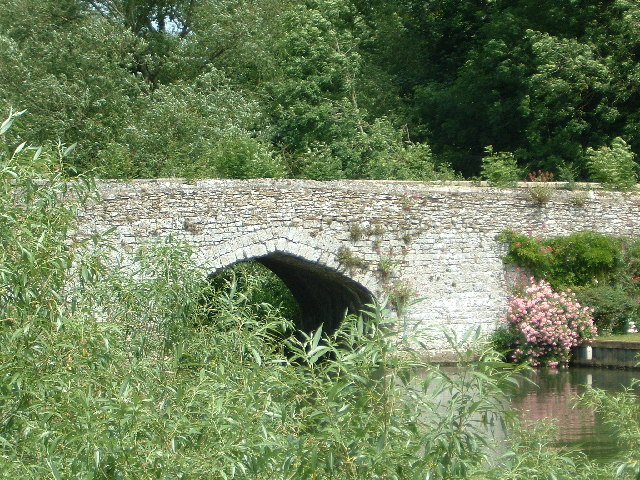
- Old Culham Bridge
- Coordinates: 51.6584°N 1.2772°W
- Carries: Thames Path
- Crosses: Swift Ditch
- Locale: Abingdon, Oxfordshire
- Maintained by: Oxfordshire County Council

Characteristics
- Design: Arch bridge
- Material: Stone
- No. of spans: Five

History
- Construction end: 1422
- Closed: 1927

Location
- Interactive map of Culham Bridge

Culham Bridge Act 1807
- Act of Parliament
- Parliament of the United Kingdom
- Long title: An Act for building a Bridge over the River Thames, from the Parish of Sutton Courtney, in the County of Berks, to the Parish of Culham, in the County of Oxford.
- Citation: 47 Geo. 3 Sess. 2. c. xliii

Dates
- Royal assent: 1 August 1807

Culham Bridge is a medieval bridge crossing a present backwater of the River Thames in England at Culham, Oxfordshire, near the town of Abingdon. The bridge crosses Swift Ditch which was at one time the main navigation channel of the River Thames until Abingdon Lock was built in 1790. The bridge formerly carried the A415 road from Abingdon to Dorchester, Oxfordshire, but was superseded in 1928 by a modern road bridge.

It is a Grade II* listed building.

== History ==
Culham Bridge was built of stone between 1416 and 1422 to replace an ancient ford called Culham Hythe by a religious body known as The Brotherhood of Christ (later Christ's Hospital) who subsequently looked after its upkeep. It was built as part of an improvement scheme, together with the two bridges at Abingdon and a causeway across Andersey Island. It is recorded that the completion of Abingdon Bridge severely damaged trade at Wallingford.

In the early 17th century the Oxford-Burcot Commission constructed a lock at the top of Swift Ditch to direct navigation under Culham Bridge and this remained the main route of the Thames until Abingdon Lock was built in 1790.

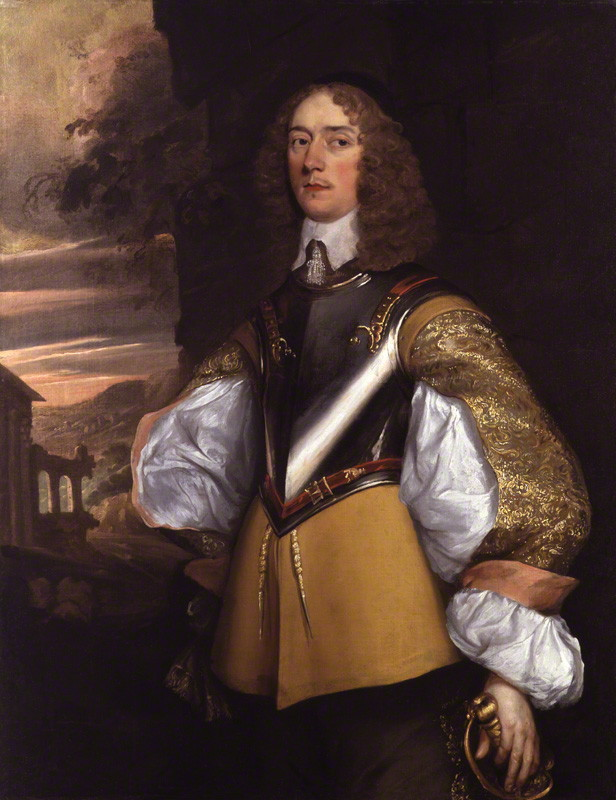
Sir Henry Gage, who was killed at the bridge

During the English Civil War the bridge had considerable strategic importance. After the Royalists left Abingdon in May 1644 the Parliamentarians seized Culham Bridge, and harried the royalist food convoys on the way to Oxford. The Royalists tried to recapture the bridge and demolish it in January 1645. This resulted in a skirmish on 11 January known as the battle of Culham Bridge. Sir Henry Gage "while boldly leading his men in a third assault on the enemy... was hit by a bullet and killed".

In the 18th century the road was in a very bad state, leading to an act of Parliament for its improvement. The bridge carried the main traffic until 1928, when the modern road bridge was built upstream of it and Culham Bridge became a pedestrian bridge.

During World War II two concrete pill boxes were built on the bridge, each weighing 250 tons and carrying anti-tank guns, and part of the parapet was removed to make way for a concrete platform. The bridge was subsequently restored and is classified as an ancient monument.

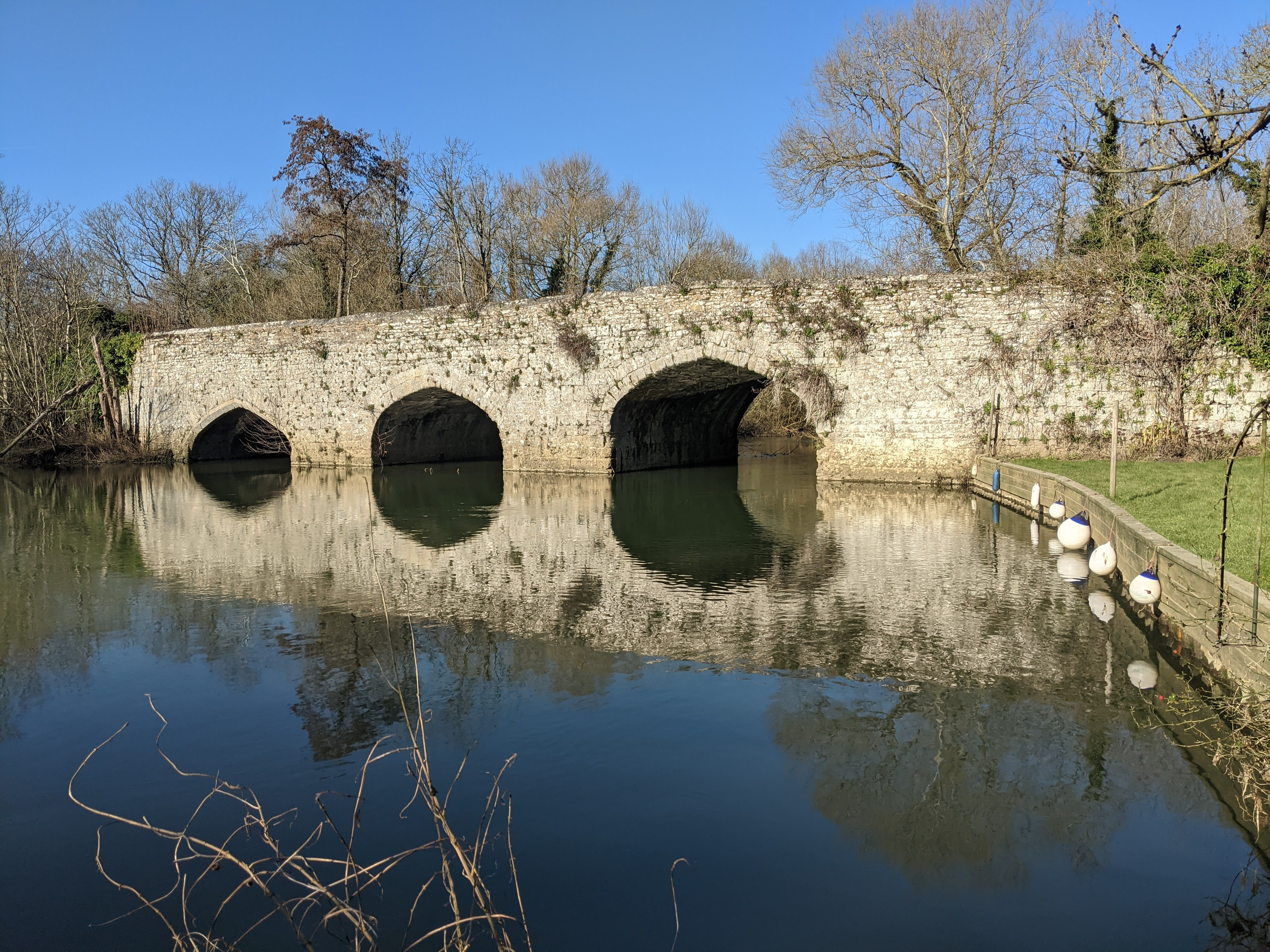
Old Culham Bridge (South Side)

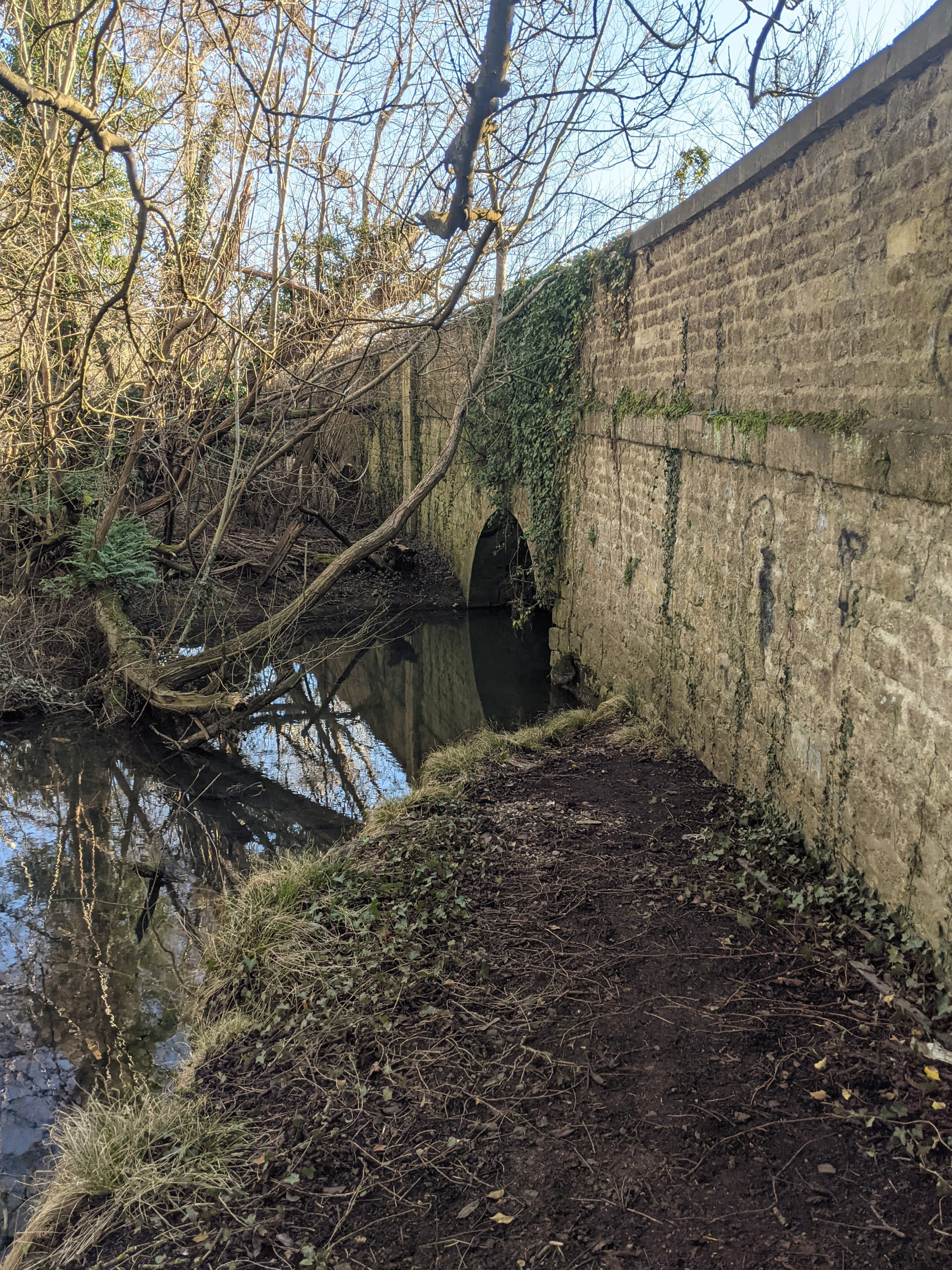
Old Culham Bridge (North Side)

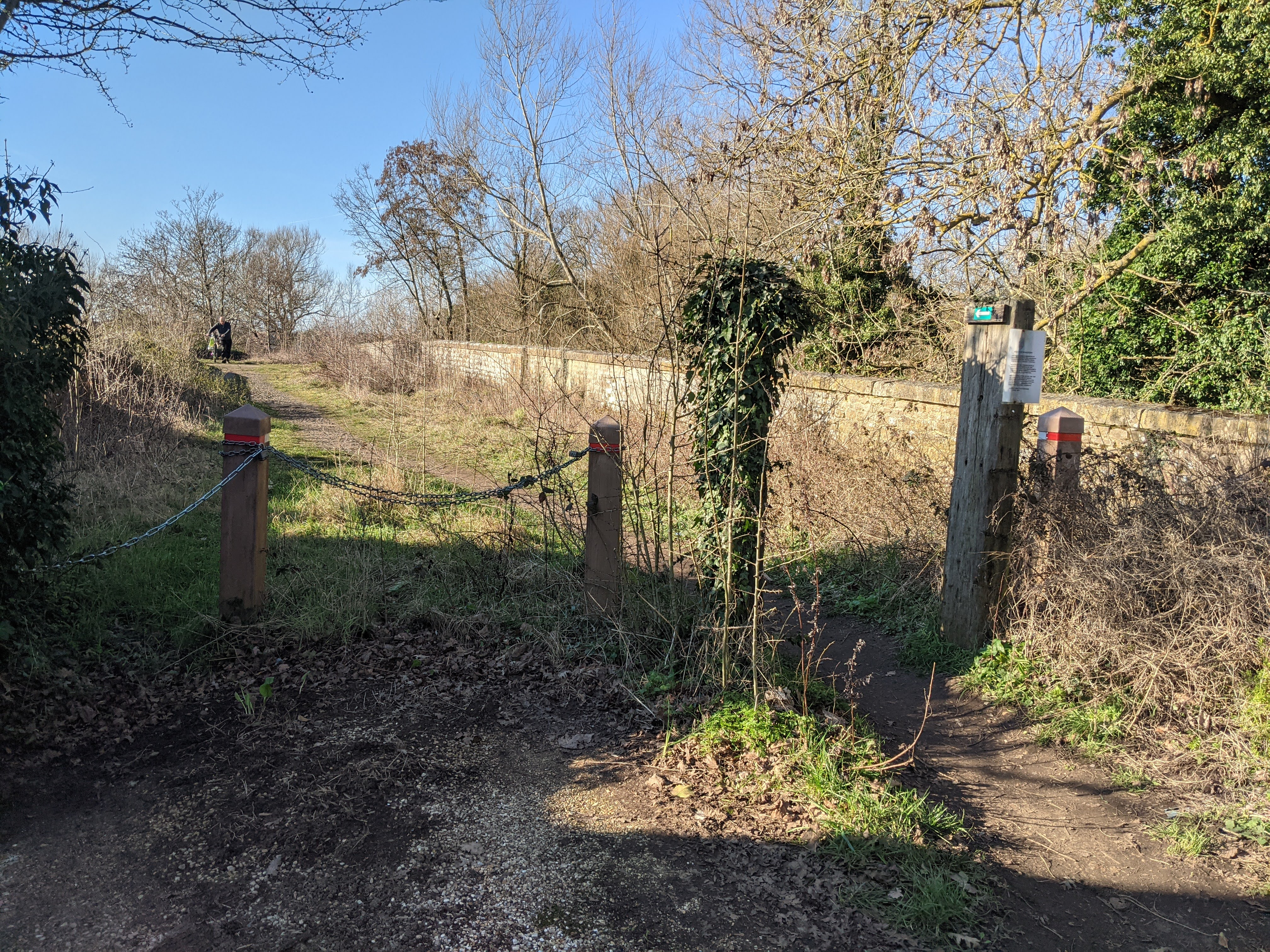
Footpath Over Bridge (East Side)

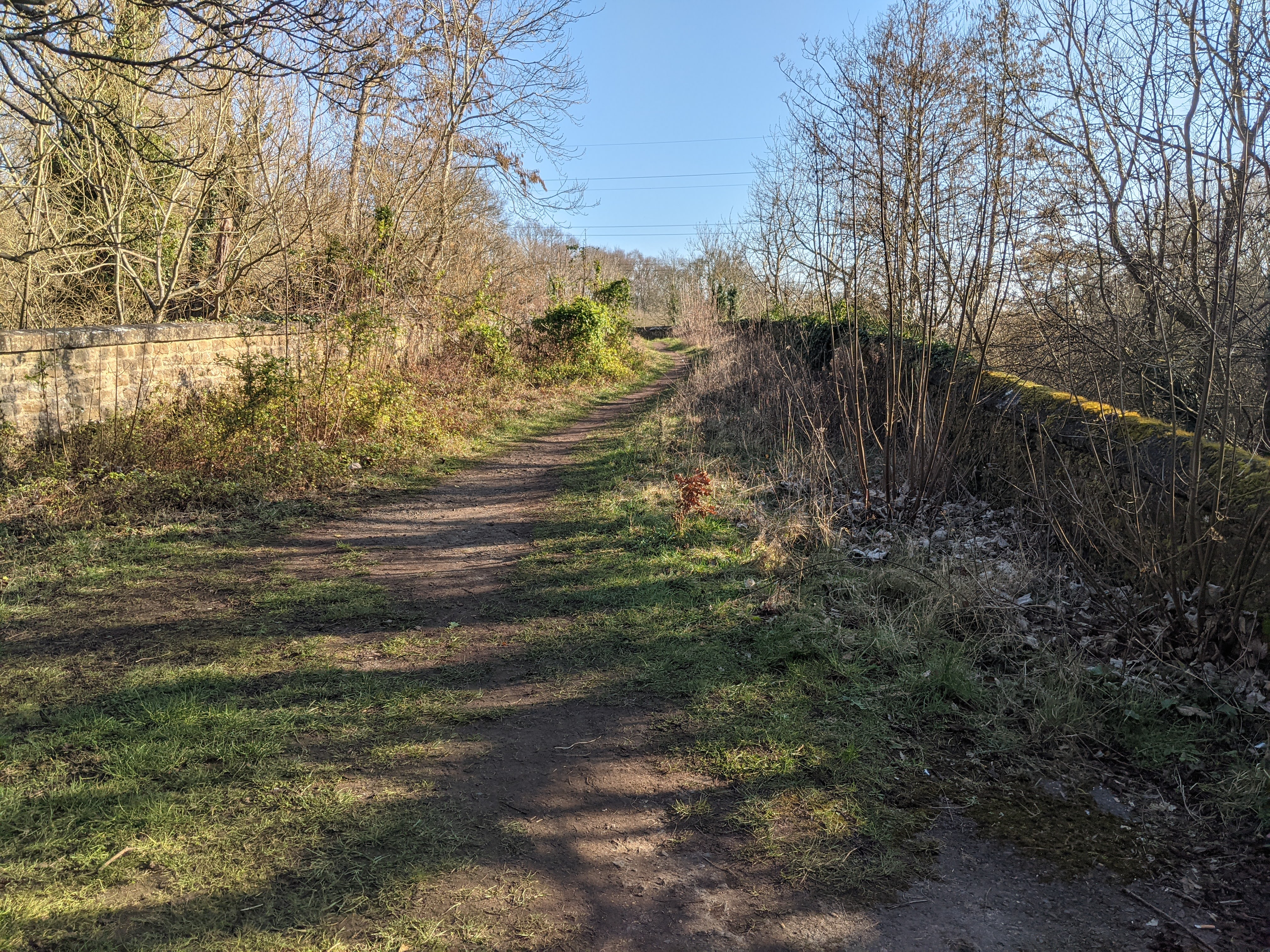
Footpath Over Bridge (West Side)

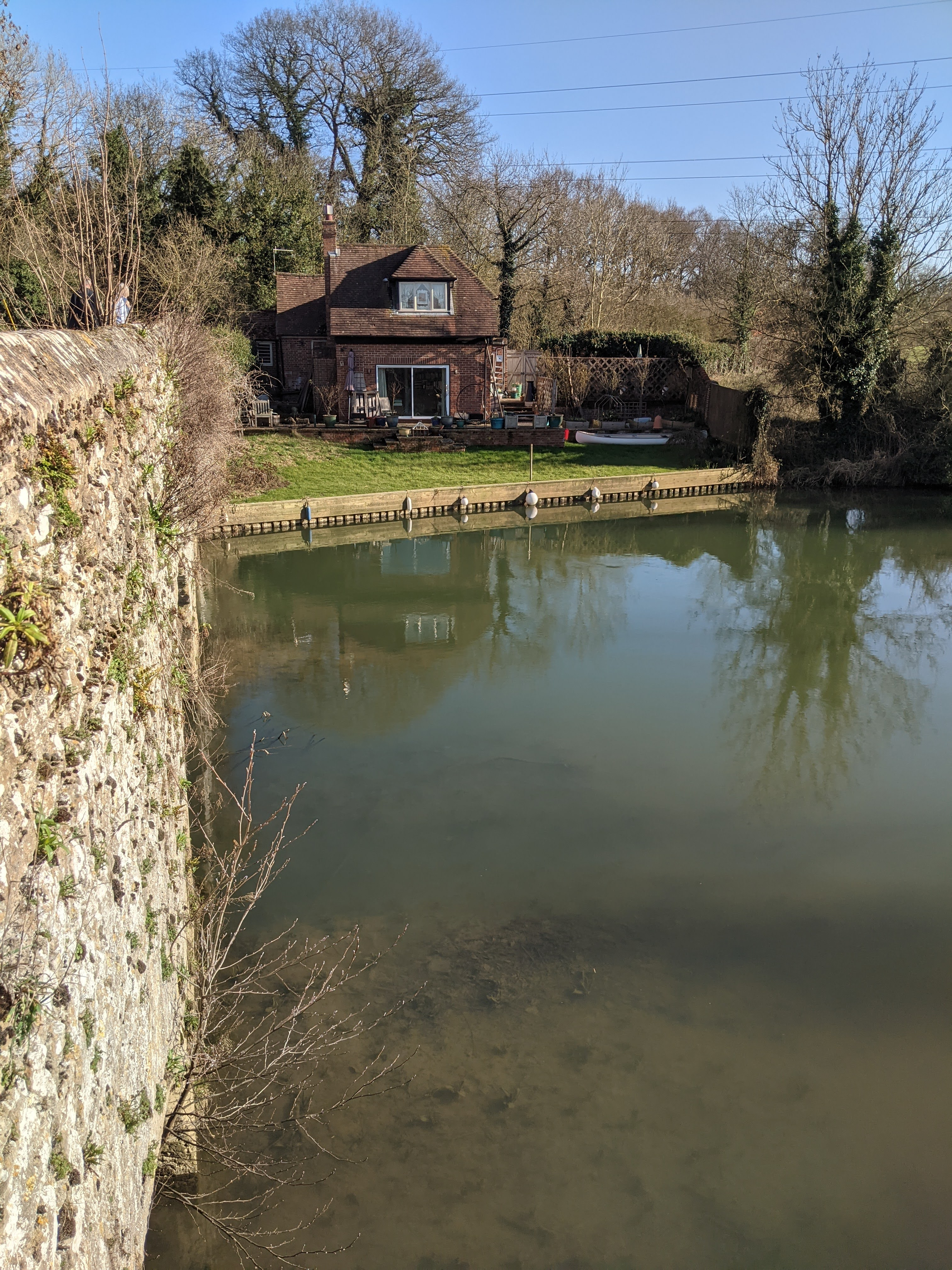
Bridge and Cottage

== See also ==
- Crossings of the River Thames
- Sutton Bridge, Oxfordshire
