= Culham Lock =

River lock in Oxfordshire, England

Coordinates: 51.6504°N 1.2676°W

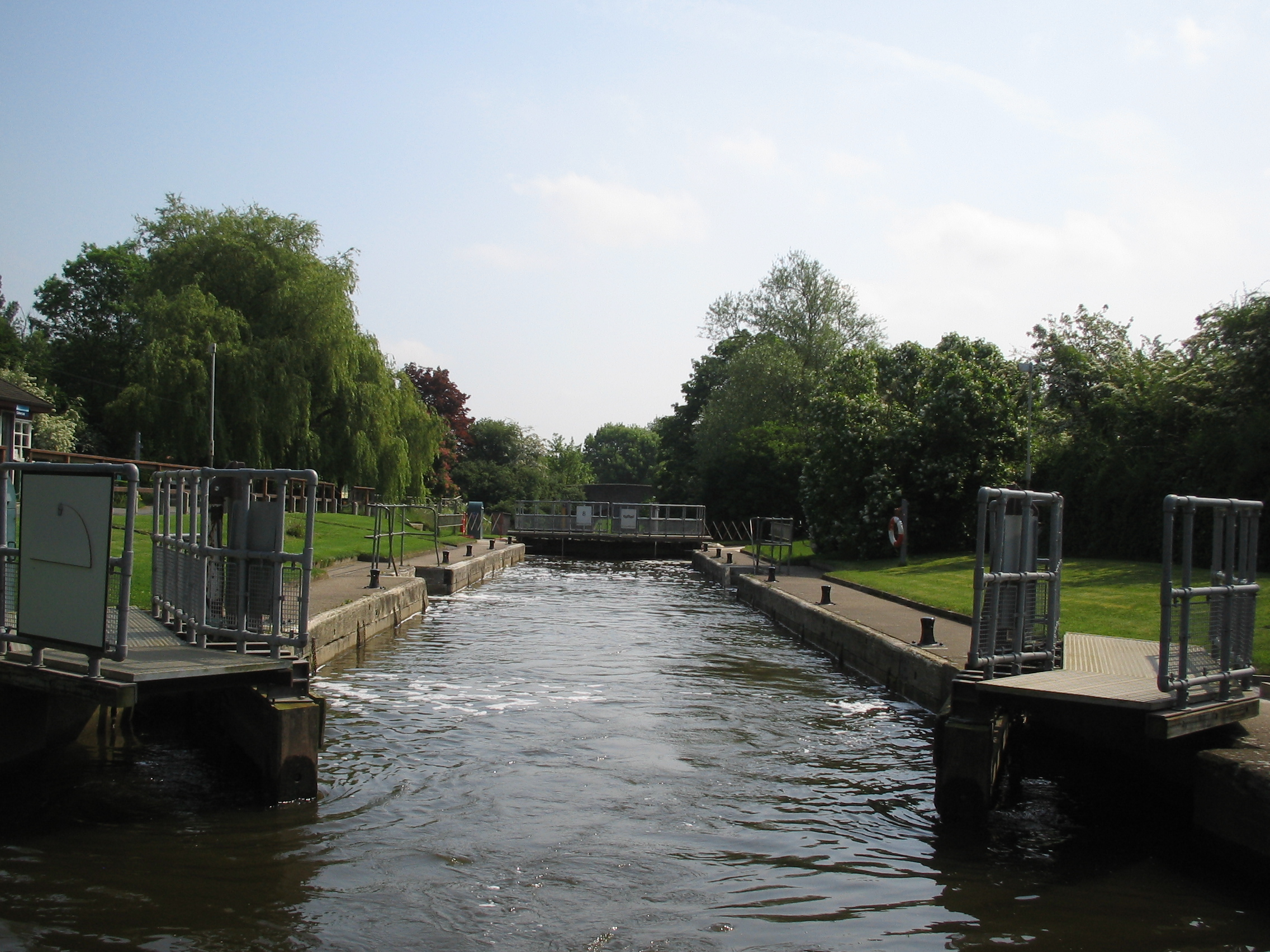
- Culham lock from upstream
- Waterway: River Thames
- County: Oxfordshire
- Maintained by: Environment Agency
- Operation: Hydraulic
- First built: 1809
- Length: 39.87 m (130 ft 10 in)
- Width: 5.33 m (17 ft 6 in)
- Fall: 2.41 m (7 ft 11 in)
- Above sea level: 161'
- Distance to Teddington Lock: 82 miles

Culham Lock is a lock on the River Thames in England close to Culham, Oxfordshire. It is on a lock cut to the north of the main stream, which approaches the large village of Sutton Courtenay. The lock was built of stone by the Thames Navigation Commission in 1809.

The associated weirs are on the old course of the river under the massive causeway which separates the millstream from picturesque Sutton Pools. The causeway is very old and was thought to have been built by Saxon labour.

== History ==
The river originally passed close to Sutton Courtenay and under a large mill there. In 1667 occurs the first reference to a pound lock underneath this mill. This had a set of gates beneath the mill floor and included a wide pool at the back of the mill. Consequently, it required a very large volume of water to fill it and so incurred a heavy toll. There were complaints to the Thames Navigation Commission in 1772 that the floor of the mill was a great obstruction to navigation. Although it was privately owned, the Commission undertook some improvements in 1789, but complaints persisted on the grounds of inconvenience and high tolls.

In 1803, Zachary Allnutt of Henley was appointed as Surveyor to the second and third districts of the Thames, which stretched from Mapledurham to Staines. He replaced John Clarke, who died that year, and was the son of Henry Allnutt, who was clerk to the Thames Commission from 1771 to 1820. Before his appointment, he had carried out a number of surveys for the Commission, including one for a new lock at Culham in 1802, but the scale of the works were larger than any previously undertaken, and the plan was not implemented immediately. However, he made a further survey in 1809, and work began in June, on the longest cut ever made on the Thames. It was 1,400 yards (1,300 m) long, with a lock at the lower end, constructed with stone walls, and with a relatively large drop for the time of 7 feet (2.1 m). A stone bridge with a span of 20 feet (6.1 m) was built to carry a road across the cut, and the work took just over a year to complete. The total cost of the project was just under £9,000, which included the purchase of the land. The project was overseen by George Treacher, who was awarded £100 in recognition of his services, when it was completed. Part of the older towpath around the backwater fell into disuse after the lock was built.

== Access to the lock ==
The lock can be reached from the road at Sutton Bridge, Oxfordshire or on foot across the fields from Sutton Courtenay.

== Reach above the lock ==
The navigation follows the lock cut upstream, at the end of the cut is the main river weirstream past Sutton Pools, then the river turns sharply to the right. A new junction for the Wilts & Berks Canal has been constructed almost opposite the top end of Culham Cut as part of a restoration project. The junction was opened on 30 August 2006, and initially runs for about 150 yd (137m) to a winding hole, but will eventually link to the historic route of the canal to the west of Abingdon.

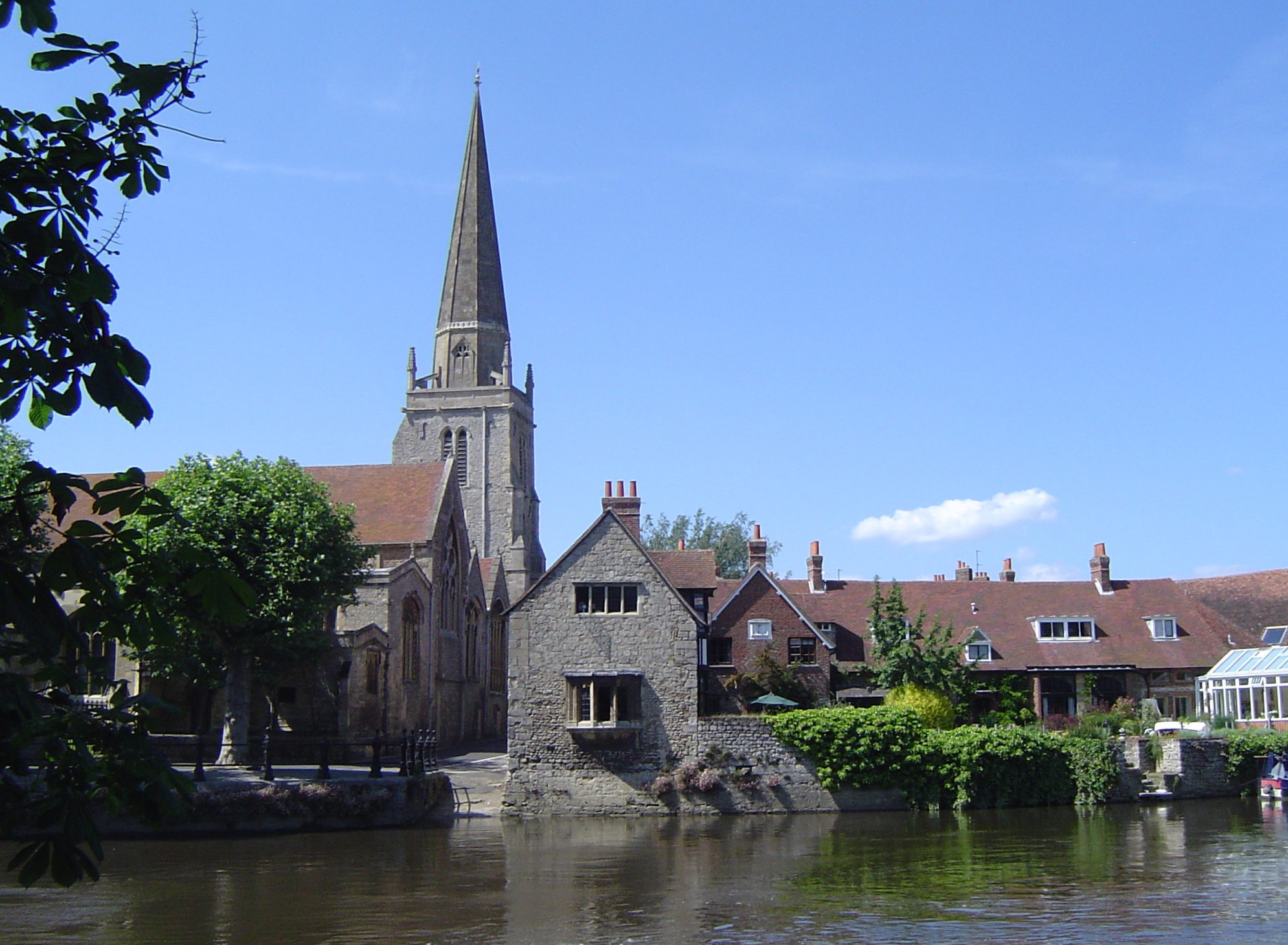
Abingdon riverside from the other side of the river

About halfway along the river on the eastern bank the Swift Ditch rejoins the main stream. This backwater was formerly the main course of the river and is crossed by a footbridge and the ancient Culham Bridge. The Swift Ditch creates Andersey Island, one of the largest islands on the Thames. On the Thames side there is an attractive piece of parkland before Abingdon Bridge. On the opposite side here is the town of Abingdon. After the bricked-up former entrance to the Wilts & Berks Canal there is an iron bridge over the mouth of the River Ock and then the town quayside. The river is crossed by Abingdon Bridge which is divided into two (the part across the main navigation being Burford Bridge) by Nag's Head Island. Beyond this on the Abingdon side is parkland associated with Abingdon Abbey.

There is a rowing club on the reach which is the site of the Abingdon Head race.

The Thames Path follows the eastern bank over Culham Bridge and Andersey Island to Abingdon Lock, where it crosses over to the other side.

Next crossing upstream	River Thames	Next crossing downstream
Abingdon Bridge (road)	Culham Lock bridges	Sutton Bridge (road)
Next lock upstream	River Thames	Next lock downstream
Abingdon Lock; 4.15 km (2.58 mi)	Culham Lock; Grid reference SU507948	Clifton Lock; 4.52 km (2.81 mi)

== See also ==
- Locks on the River Thames
- Rowing on the River Thames
- List of crossings of the River Thames

== Bibliography ==
- Skempton, Alec (1996). Civil Engineers and Engineering in Britain, 1600-1830. Variorum. ISBN 978-0-86078-578-1.
