= Swift Ditch =

Artificial channel near Oxford, England

Coordinates: 51°39′49″N 1°16′13″W

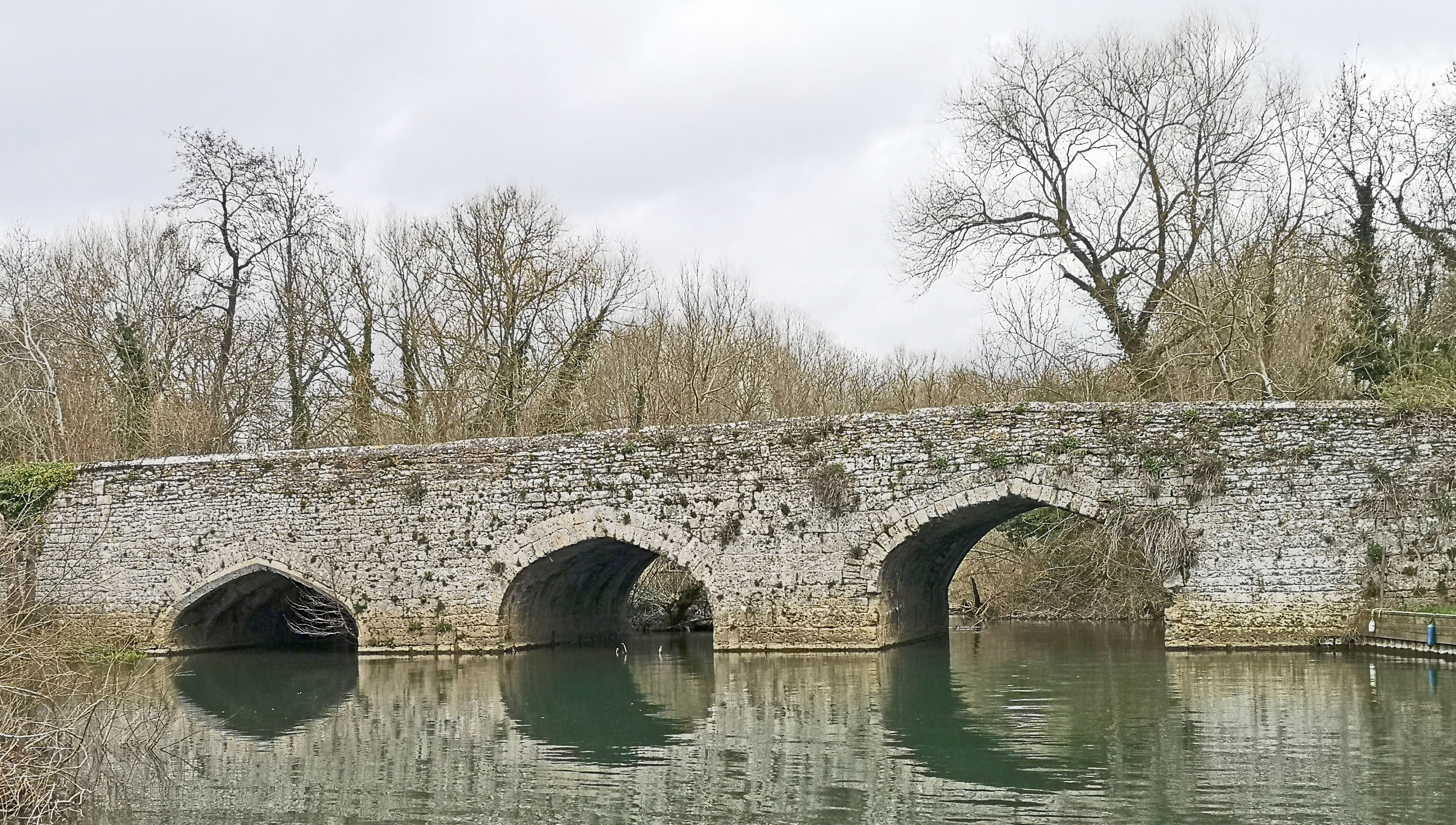
- Culham old bridge crossing the Swift Ditch just above its outflow to the Thames

Details
- Location: Left bank of the River Thames
- Opened: c. 1055
- Length: 2 kilometres (1.2 mi)
- North end: Opposite Thrupp, half way between Nuneham Railway Bridge and Abingdon Lock
- South end: Just below Culham Bridge

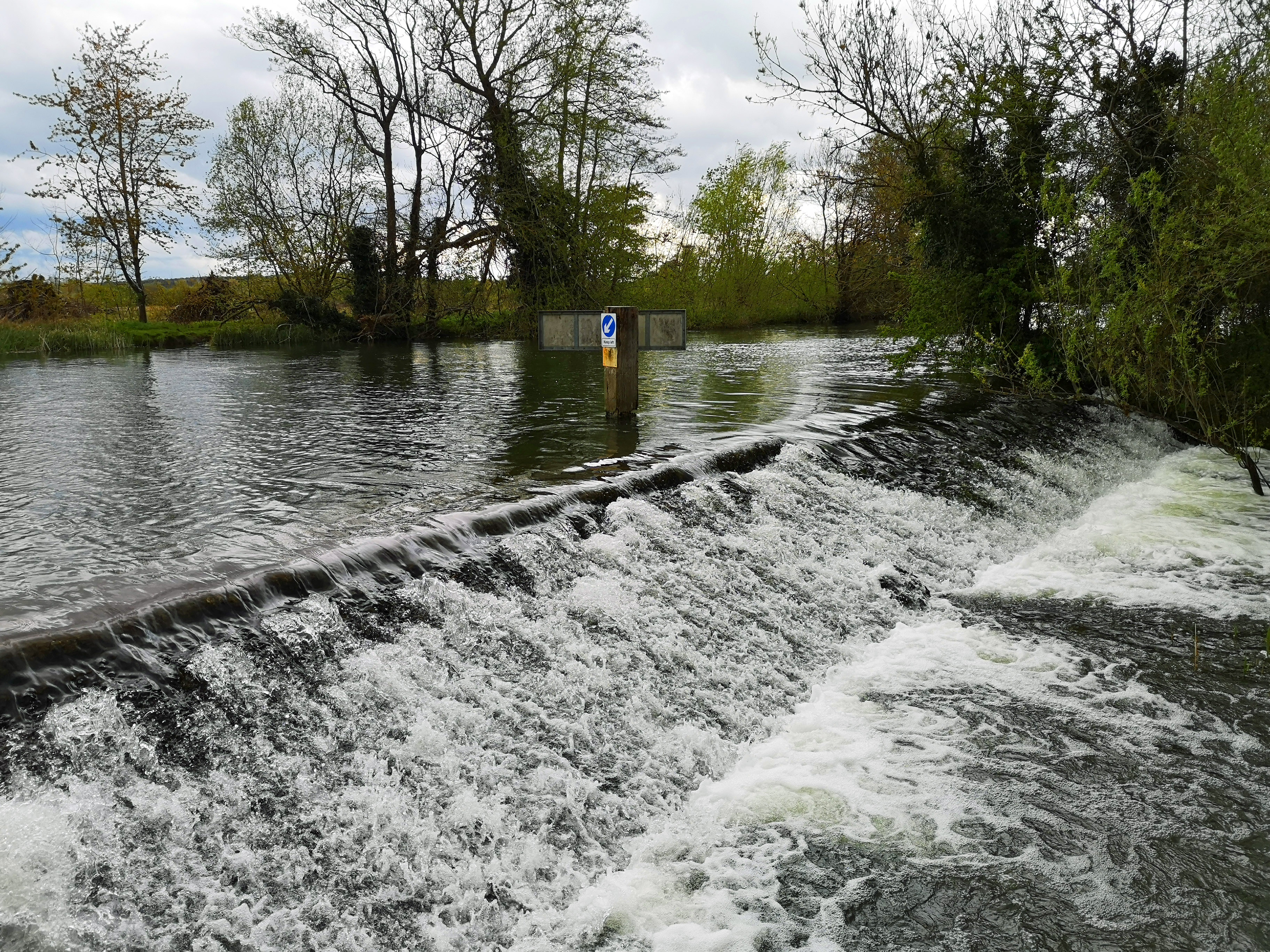
Weir at the main (Western) head of the Swift Ditch

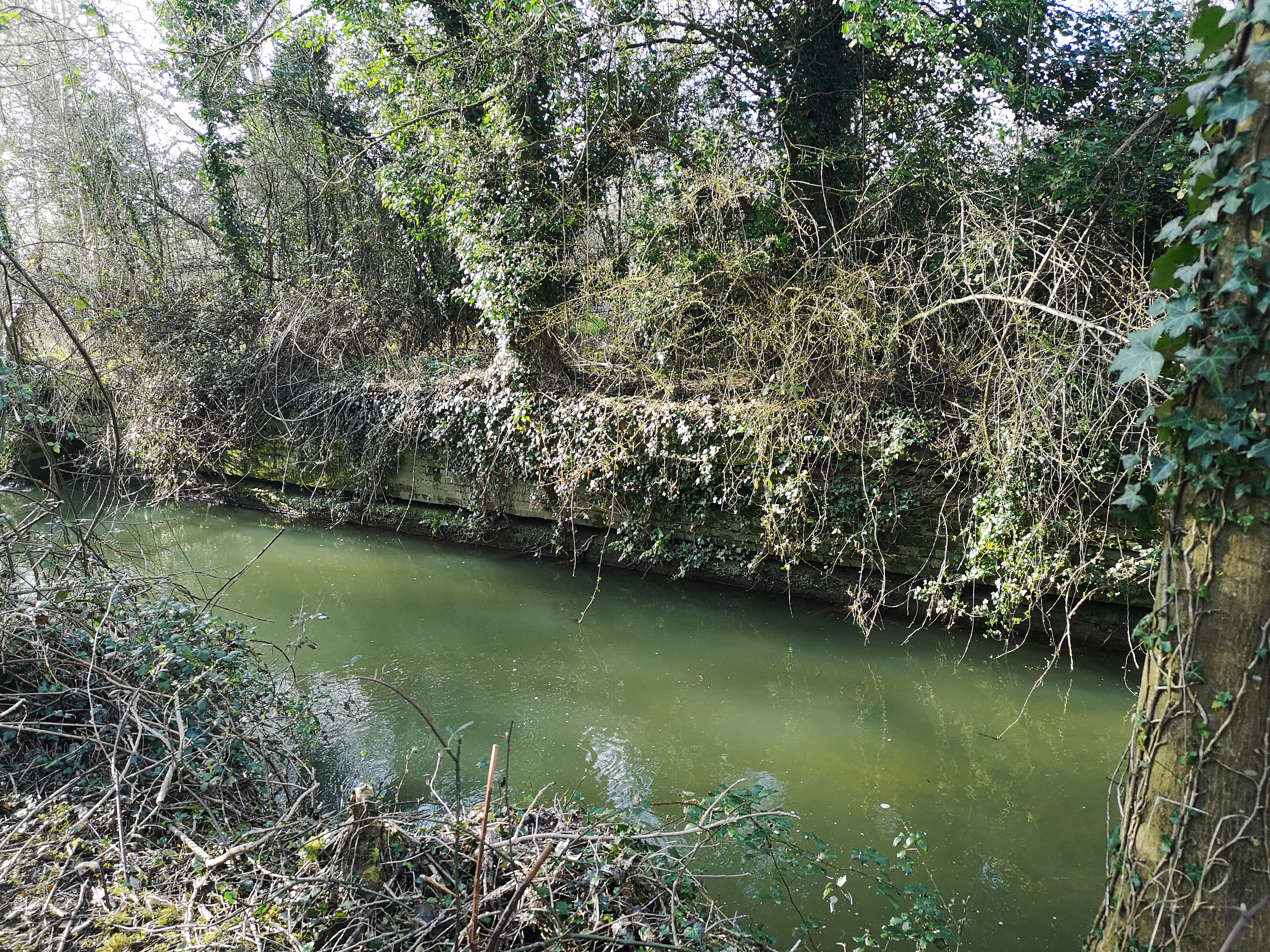
Remains of the old pound lock near the Eastern head of the Swift Ditch

The Swift Ditch is a 2 km (1.2 mi) long artificial channel that formed a short-cut for river traffic to and from Oxford, across a meander of the River Thames in England. It was formerly the primary navigation channel. With the main river, it creates Andersey Island on the left bank of the Thames opposite Abingdon-on-Thames. Within a poem published in 1632, the Water Poet John Taylor wrote:

At Abingdon the shoals are worse and worse
That Swift Ditch seems to be the better course

== History ==
When Ordric was elected Abbot at the Abbey in Abingdon in 1052, the River Thames was the main transport route for goods between London and Oxford. There were complaints from people in both these towns that, where it passed the Abbey, the River Thames was so blocked up that river traffic was seriously hampered. In response Ordric ordered a new navigation channel to be excavated, possibly enlarging a previous less navigable one. The channel left the main stream near Thrupp, and passed through the meadows of Andersey to the south of the Abbey Church, flowing back into the Thames at Culham. This new channel remained the main navigation for over seven centuries. The toll per boat was a hundred herrings in Lent. Around 960 AD, the monks had built a head mill stream to the Abbey from the direction of the Swift Ditch.

During Tudor times, the channel was known as Purden's Stream. However by the end of the Tudor period it was known as Swift Ditch, remaining the faster route. The Oxford-Burcot Commission of 1605 and 1624 sought to develop the Swift Ditch as the main route for boats. One of the first three River Thames pound locks was built at its head in about 1636.

In 1788 several influential citizens of Abingdon wanted to divert navigation back to the current course and as a result Abingdon Lock was built near the town. Within ten years, the Wilts & Berks Canal connected to the current navigation channel at Abingdon.

== Configuration ==
There are two outflows from the Thames into the Swift Ditch about 200 metres (0.12 mi) apart. The upstream one has a small weir that leads to the remains of the pound lock and the downstream one is a larger weir. The two arms flow together a short distance below the end of the pound lock. Around the midpoint of the channel there is a widened section where there used to be a flash lock. The banks are tree-lined and the vegetation intrudes into the channel. However, the Swift Ditch is used by canoeists.

At the southern, downstream end, the Swift Ditch is crossed by three bridges. The original Culham Bridge was built in 1416 - the same time as the Abingdon Bridges across the Thames - and was the site of a Civil War skirmish in 1645. It was supplemented in 1928 by an adjacent bridge carrying the present A415 Abingdon-Burcot road. A wooden footbridge further downstream carries the Thames Path.

== See also ==
- Tributaries of the River Thames
- Physical and Natural Aspects of the River Thames
