= Burcot =

Burcot may refer to:

- Burcot, Oxfordshire, England
- Burcot, Worcestershire, England

== See also ==
- Burcote
- Burcott (disambiguation)
