= Burcott =

Burcott may refer to:

- Burcott, Bierton, Buckinghamshire, England
- Burcott, Wing, Buckinghamshire, England
- Burcot, Oxfordshire, England
- Burcott, Somerset, England

== See also ==
- Burcot (disambiguation)
- Burcote
