= Andersey Island =

Island in the River Thames, England

Coordinates: 51.667°N 1.270°W

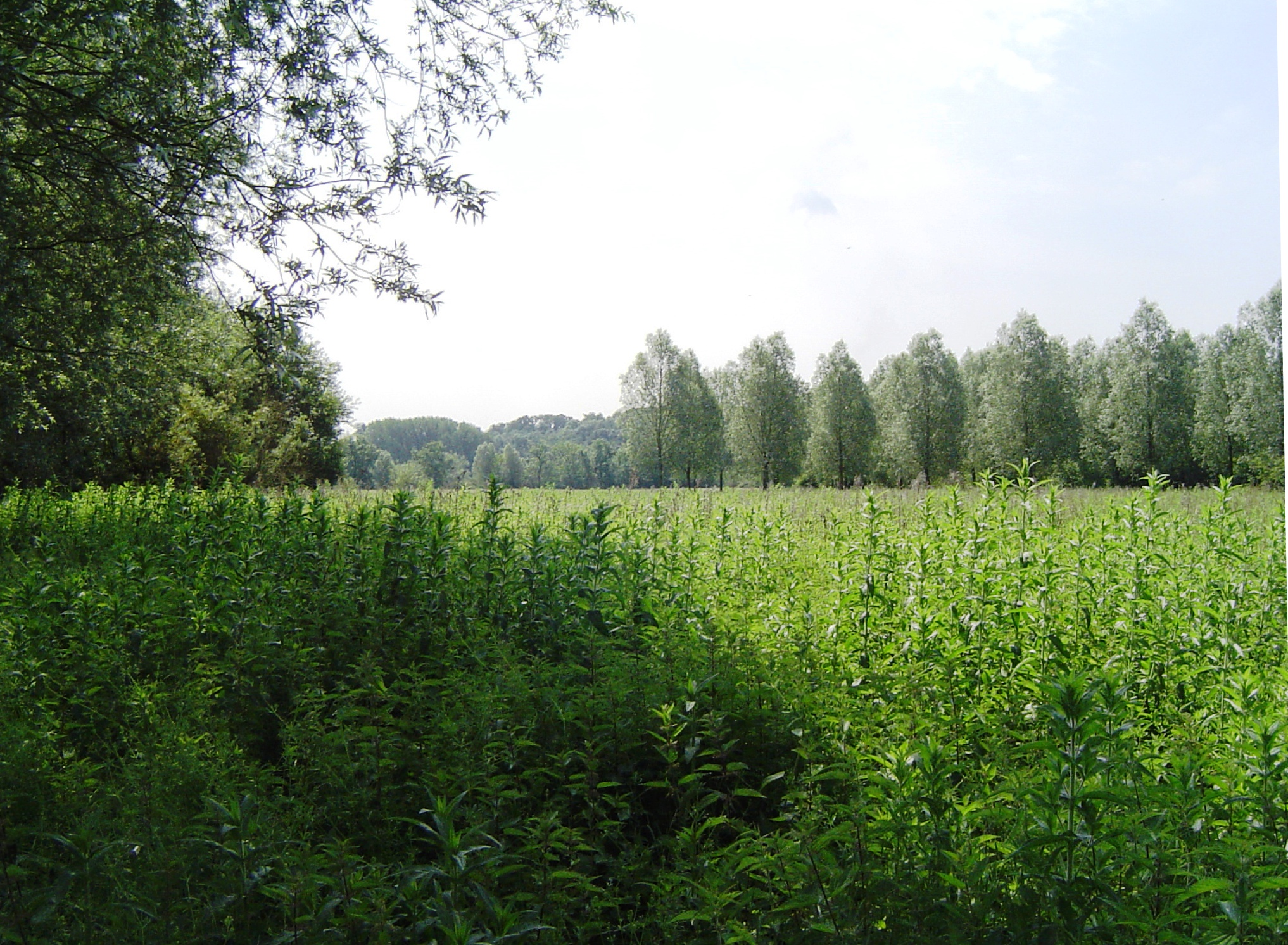
Andersey Island

Andersey Island is a 273-acre (110.5 ha) area of flood-meadow and former flood-meadow south-east of Abingdon Bridge, Abingdon-on-Thames, Oxfordshire, England, on the reach of the River Thames above Culham Lock. It is in Culham parish, but has close links with Abingdon-on-Thames, which lies directly across the (main branch of the) Thames. It is the second-largest island in the non-tidal part of the Thames. (The largest is the recently created island between the Thames and the engineered Jubilee River channel, which encloses Dorney and Eton.)

The A415 road, the main road leading south from Abingdon, crosses the island on a causeway. The Thames Path also crosses the island.

== Location ==
The island is created by a natural anabranch (a corollary, specifically a meander cutoff) of the river, the Swift Ditch. Today it is a backwater, and since at least the 1800s has been weir-controlled. It comprises 273 acres (110.5 ha) and is the fifth largest island of the river including the outer reaches of its estuary, discounting the area south of the Jubilee River, a channel opened in 2004.

== History and uses ==
History

Andersey in Old English and Middle English means Andrew's island.

The island was the site of a royal residence in Anglo-Saxon times, its ruins commonly called the "castell of the rhae" in the times of John Leland (antiquary) (d. 1552); the place was favoured by the royalty of Mercia and Wessex. Offa was the first to build a royal residence on Andersey Island and there his son king Ecgfrith of Mercia died in 796.

The destroyed palace of sorts was assumed by the Normans and used as a hunting lodge by William I and William II . The site was handed over to the Abbot of Abingdon in about 1100 and the buildings fell to ruin. The main Dorchester-Abingdon road runs through the island, legally declared to have existed so as to claim public right of way from 'time immemorial'. It crosses into Andersey Island via Culham New Bridge, erected in 1928 by the Oxfordshire County Council. Until then, Culham Old Bridge, which lies slightly to the south was in use. The old bridge, now scheduled as an ancient monument, was part of a major scheme for improving links between Abingdon and Dorchester: between 1416 and 1422 the causeway across Andersey and bridges were erected by the Abingdon Guild of the Holy Cross.

Henry was persuaded by Queen Maud to return the island to Abingdon's ownership but not parish and to allow the abbot to use the lead from its houses for the roof of the abbey church. A late medieval chronicle indicates that the stone buildings on the island were already in decay.

An Oxford-Burcot Commission was established by Acts of 1605 and 1624 to improve the river between Oxford and Burcot. The commission did not make use of the mainstream western meander of the river via Abingdon; instead barges were directed along the backwater between Andersey and Culham Hill, known in early Tudor times as Purden's stream.

Present use

Most of the island is open land of grass, marsh reeds, poplars and willows. It has a football club, a cricket club, a leisure facility, barns and cottages.

== See also ==
- Islands in the River Thames

Next island upstream	River Thames	Next island downstream
Lock Wood Island	Andersey Island	Nag's Head Island
