= Lock Wood Island =

Island in the River Thames, England

Coordinates: 51.6740°N 1.2292°W

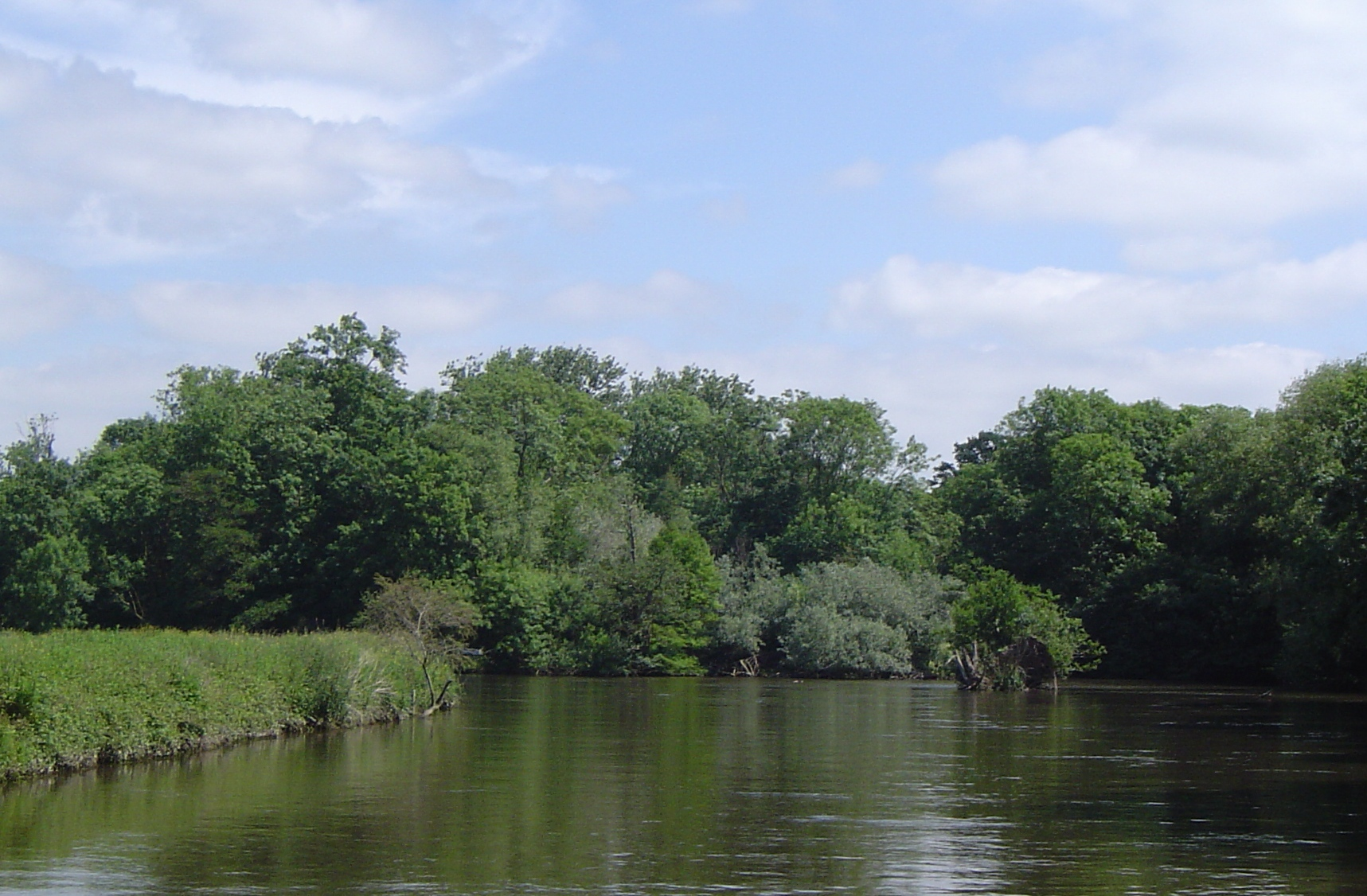
Lock Wood Island from downstream

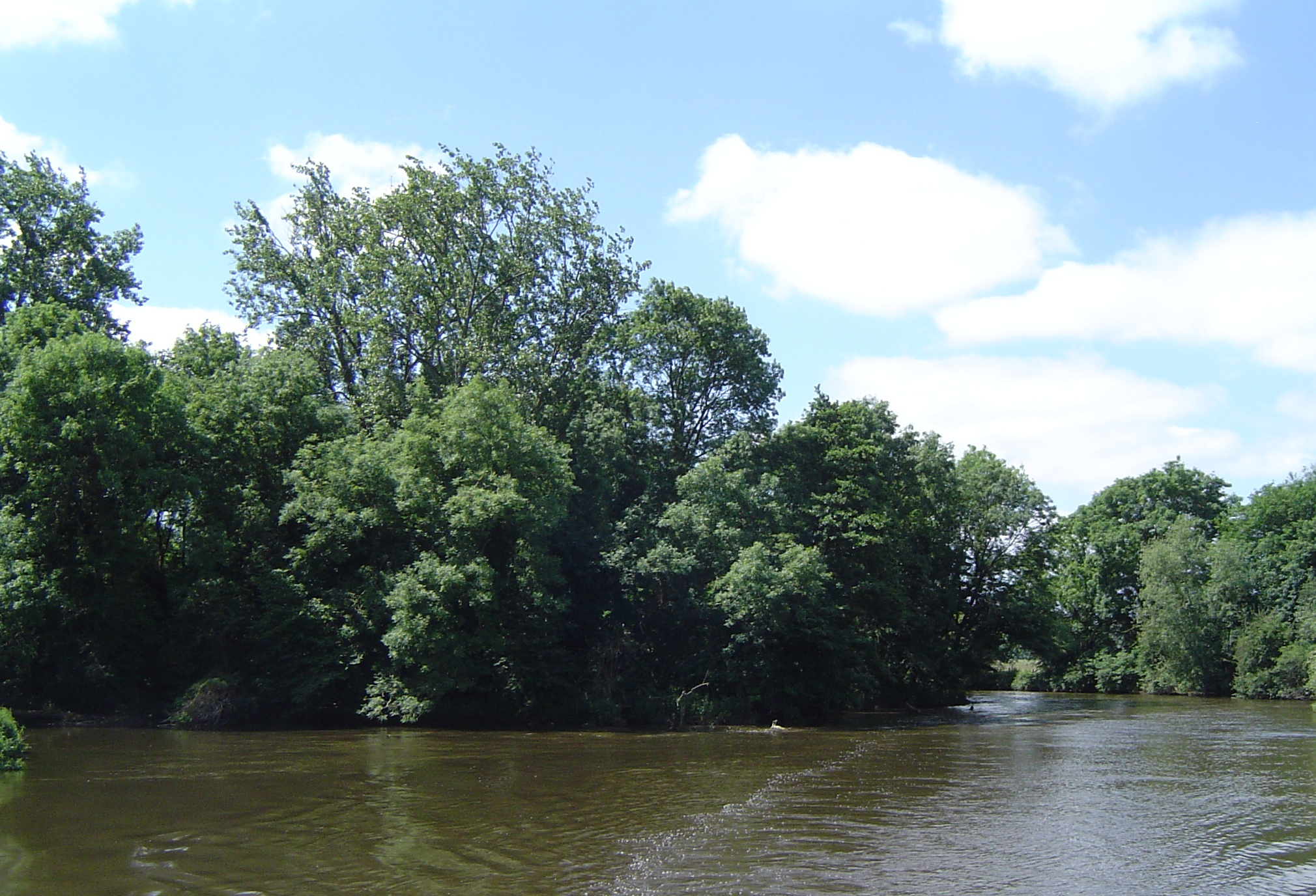
Lock Wood Island from upstream

Lock Wood Island is an island in the River Thames in England just downstream of Nuneham House on the reach above Abingdon Lock.

The island sits on a sharp bend in the river. It is densely covered with tall trees and has a narrow channel behind it. In the nineteenth century there was a thatched cottage on the island linked to the bank by a rustic bridge which was a popular place for picknickers. Alice Liddell used to visit the island with Lewis Carroll, who penned Through the Looking-Glass shortly after one of these visits. There is evidence of weirs and flash locks here, at one time owned by Lord Harcourt, which may account for the name of the island.

== Wildlife ==
The island, due to its difficult accessibility without a bridge to both people and other predatory wildlife, serves as a safe haven for different bird species such as Canadian Geese, gaggle of which can be spotted around the island during summertime.

== See also ==
- Islands in the River Thames

Next island upstream	River Thames	Next island downstream
Fiddler's Elbow	Lock Wood Island	Andersey Island
