= Nuneham Viaduct =

Railway bridge in Oxfordshire, England

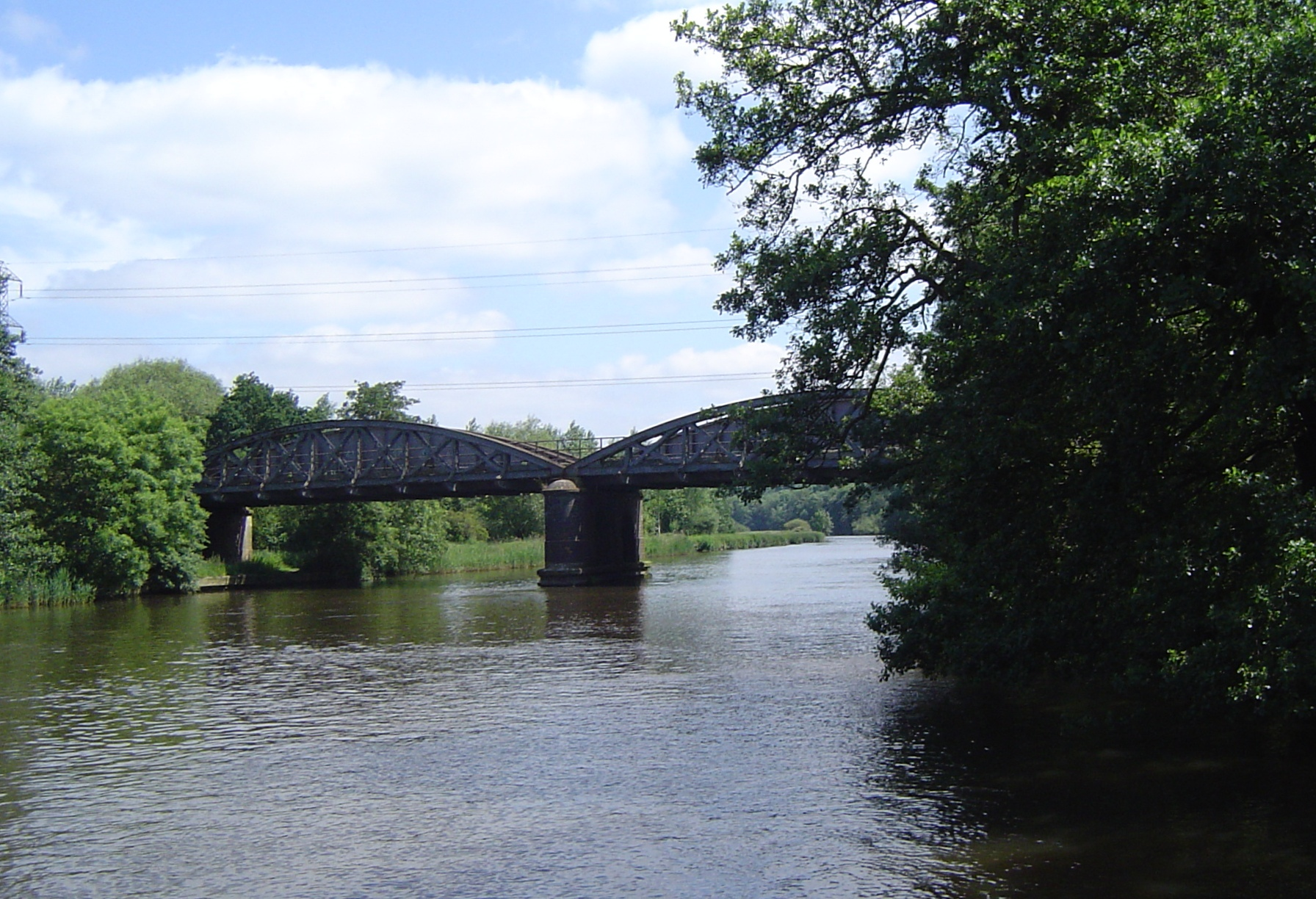
- Nuneham Viaduct from downstream
- Coordinates: 51.669456°N 1.240878°W
- Carries: Cherwell Valley Line
- Crosses: River Thames
- Locale: Abingdon, Oxfordshire
- Maintained by: Network Rail

Characteristics
- Total length: 99 yards (91 m)
- Height: 15 feet 9 inches (4.80 m)

History
- Opened: 1907

Location
- Interactive map of Nuneham Viaduct

Nuneham Viaduct, also known as Nuneham Railway Bridge and the Black Bridge is near the town of Abingdon-on-Thames in Oxfordshire, England. It is a two-span, bowstring truss bridge that carries the Didcot to Oxford section of the Cherwell Valley Line across the River Thames between Abingdon Lock and Sandford Lock. Its name is derived from the neighbouring Nuneham House. The total length is 99 yards (91 m); the southern and northern ends are respectively 57 miles 24 chains (92.22 km) and 57 miles 29 chains (92.32 km) from Paddington (via Didcot station).

As well as passenger trains, the line over the bridge carries freight from the Port of Southampton to distribution centres in the Midlands and North of England. By 2023, up to forty freight trains per day were using the route, which is part of the core UK intermodal freight network, and was to have been part of the proposed Electric Spine.

From March 2022, the bridge suffered a progressive failure with sinking of the southern end of the southern span. This led to its temporary closure to all rail traffic on 3 April 2023 and a major remedial project being undertaken; the line was reopened to traffic on 9 June 2023.

== History ==
Nuneham Railway Bridge was built in the early years of the Great Western Railway. The company built a branch line from its main London to Bristol line to serve Oxford, and later Abingdon-on-Thames; this route became known as the Cherwell Valley Line. A bridge to cross the River Thames was required, and its design and alterations had to be approved by the Thames Navigation Commission. These works were supervised by the civil engineer George Treacher.

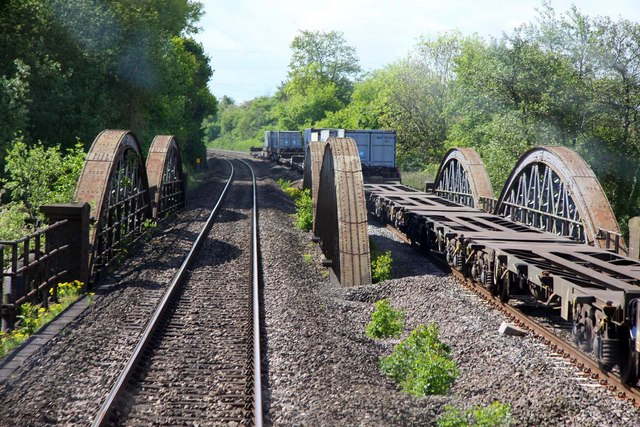
Train-level view of Nuneham Railway Bridge, circa 2009.

The original bridge, which opened to traffic in 1844, was constructed of timber but quickly proved to be inadequate, thus work on its replacement began a decade later. During 1856, the second bridge, distinguished from its predecessor by its iron structure, was completed. A third bridge was constructed between 1906 and 1907, consisting of a pair of steel bowstring spans with a single pier in the centre of the river. In 1929, a new three-arch brick built northern abutment was constructed.

== 2023 abutment replacement ==
During March 2022, sinking of the south abutment was detected and a temporary speed restriction of 50 miles per hour (80 km/h) was imposed on traffic. In January 2023, remote monitoring equipment was installed and the speed restriction reduced to 20 miles per hour (32 km/h). An attempt to remedy the situation by injecting grout into the structure failed to solve the problem, and at the end of March the speed restriction was reduced to 5 miles per hour (8.0 km/h). On 3 April 2023, the viaduct was closed to all rail traffic, with a bus replacement service operating between Didcot Parkway and Oxford stations. The Sunday Times claimed that penny-pinching in 1929 during work on the bridge was to blame; it stated that the abutment on the north bank was completely rebuilt with a brick structure, but that on the south bank had remained largely unchanged since Victorian times. No work was done on the south abutment, possibly caused by lack of funds at the time of the Great Depression.

On 5 April 2023, Network Rail tweeted that the viaduct would be closed for several weeks. They had already planned some remedial ground-strengthening work for March, and an access road had been built. However, they calculated that the temporary solution would take almost as long to complete as total replacement of the abutment, and on 10 April 2023 they specified the re-opening date as 10 June 2023.

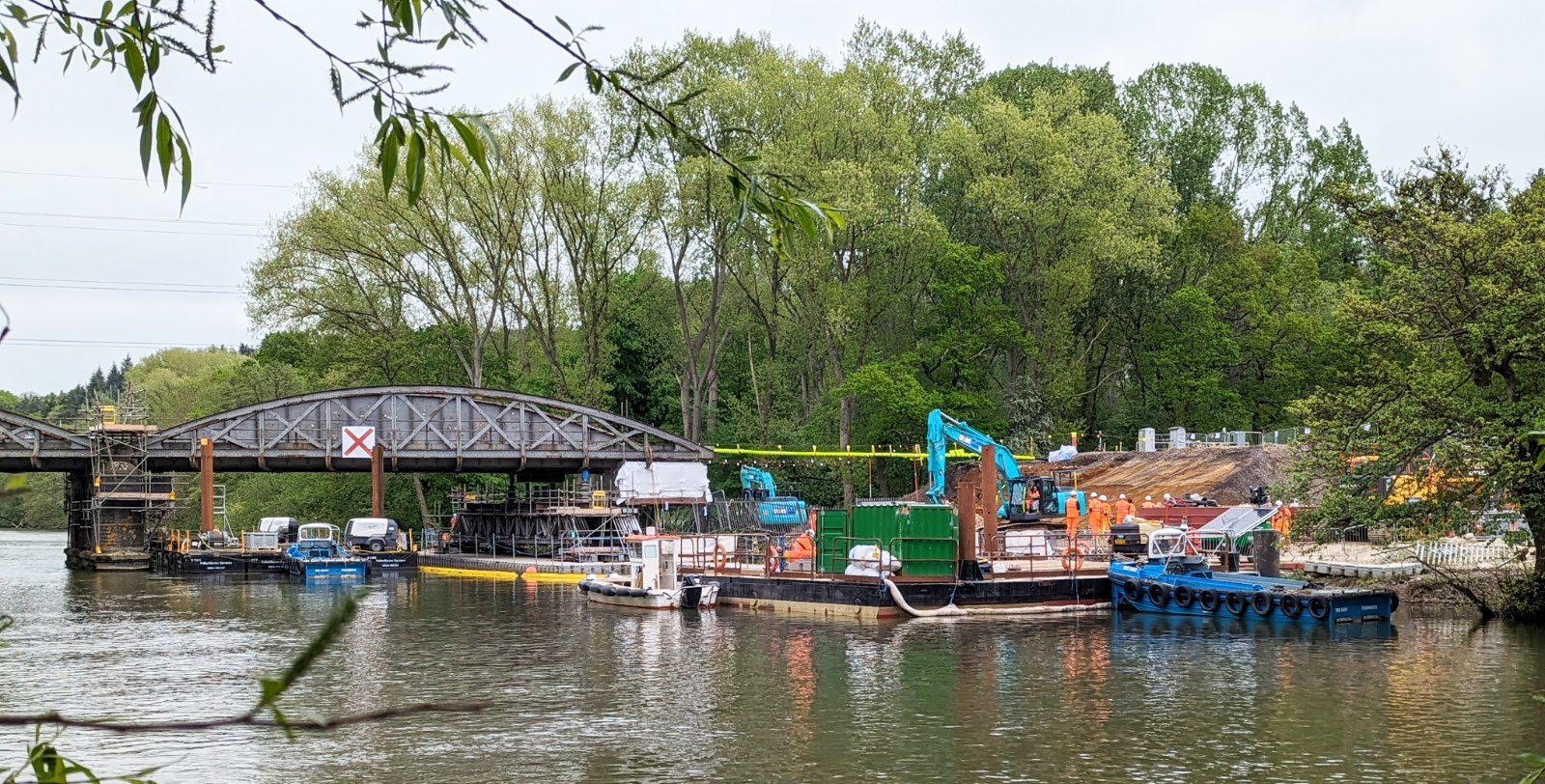
Nuneham Viaduct repair from downstream with south span supported and south abutment removed

The work involved closing the southern half of the river to build a temporary trestle on 24 piles driven into the river bed, which supported the southern span whilst a new abutment was constructed. This involved removing 3,000 cubic metres (3,900 cu yd) of material of the old abutment and embankment, and building new ones, requiring 5,500 tonnes (6,100 short tons) of new material and eight piles up to a depth of up to 25 metres (82 ft). Much of the work was carried out by TMS Maritime Ltd under contract from Balfour Beatty. The line was reopened on 9 June, one day ahead of schedule.

== See also ==
- Crossings of the River Thames

Next crossing upstream	River Thames	Next crossing downstream
Sandford Lock (pedestrian)	Nuneham Viaduct	Abingdon Lock (pedestrian)
