= Nag's Head Island =

Island in the River Thames, England

Coordinates: 51.6684°N 1.2798°W

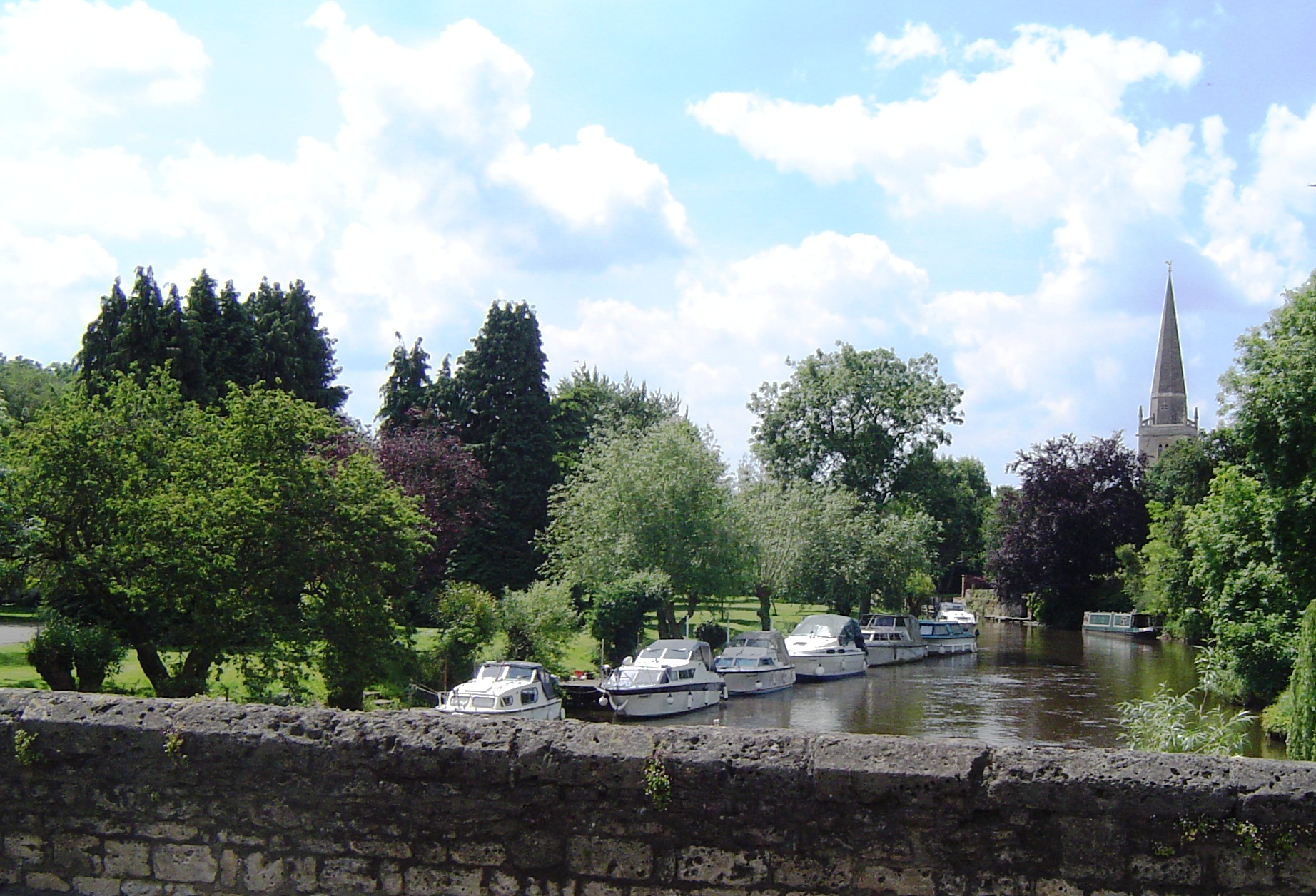
Nag's Head Island from Abingdon Bridge

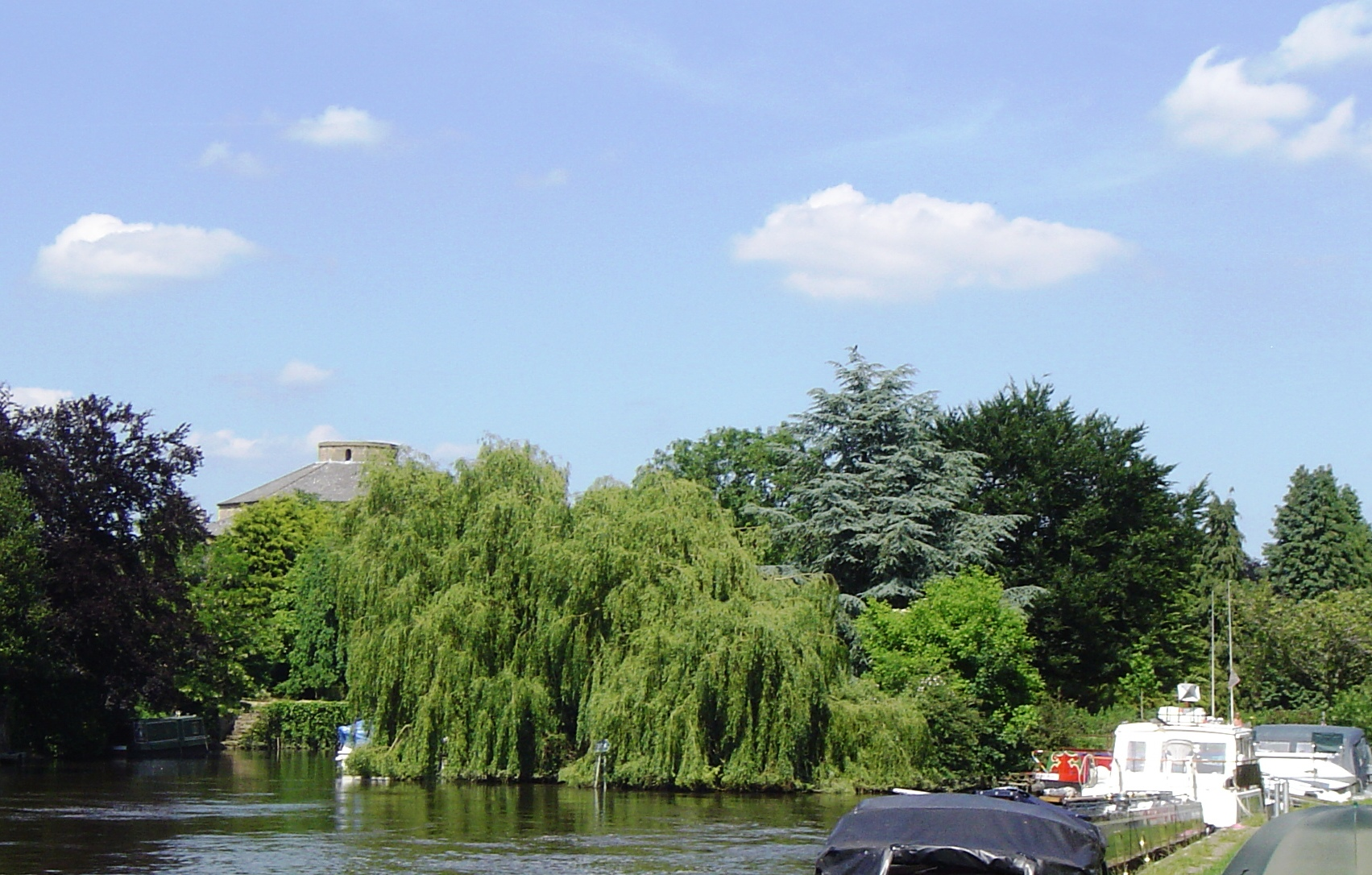
Nag's Head Island from downstream

Nag's Head Island is an island in the River Thames in Oxfordshire, England at Abingdon. It sits in the middle of the two Abingdon Bridges on the reach above Culham Lock.

The part of the island on the upstream side of the bridge is occupied by the Nag's Head public house, which gave the island its name, a nag being a useless horse.

From the top of the island here a daily river boat service to runs to Oxford.

The frontage downstream of the bridge is occupied by a riverside cafe, chandlers and navigation stores, and boat hire facilities. Behind this is an extensive public open space.

== See also ==
- Islands in the River Thames

Next island upstream	River Thames	Next island downstream
Andersey Island	Nag's Head Island	Poplar Island
