= Abingdon Bridge =

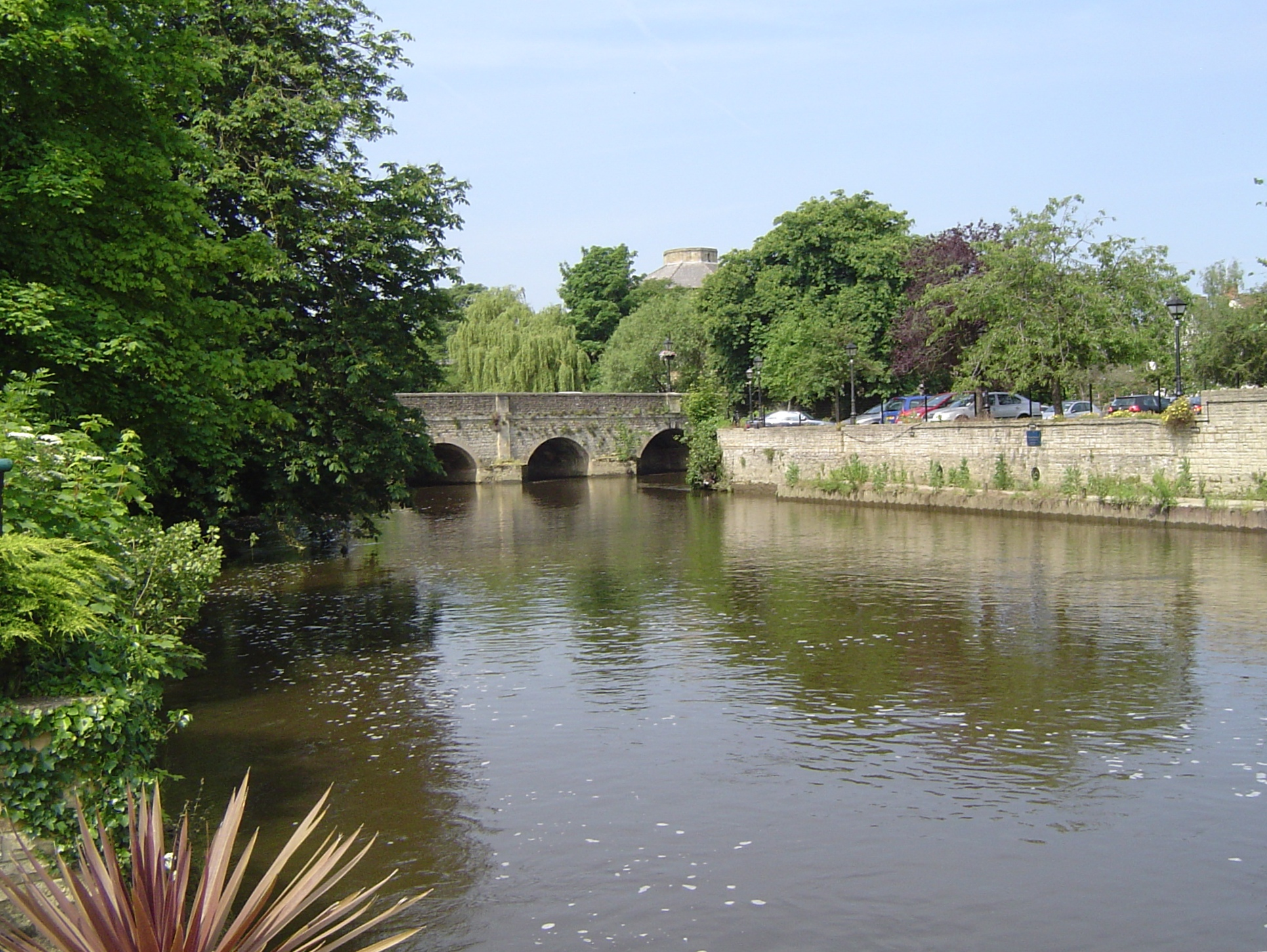
- Abingdon Bridge, looking downstream from the top of Nag's Head Island
- Coordinates: 51.6686°N 1.2795°W
- Carries: A415 road
- Crosses: River Thames
- Locale: Abingdon, Oxfordshire
- Maintained by: Oxfordshire County Council
- Heritage status: Grade II listed

Characteristics
- Design: Arch bridge
- Material: Stone
- No. of spans: 6
- Piers in water: 5

History
- Construction start: 1416
- Construction end: 1422, rebuilt 1927

Location
- Interactive map of Abingdon Bridge

Burford Bridge
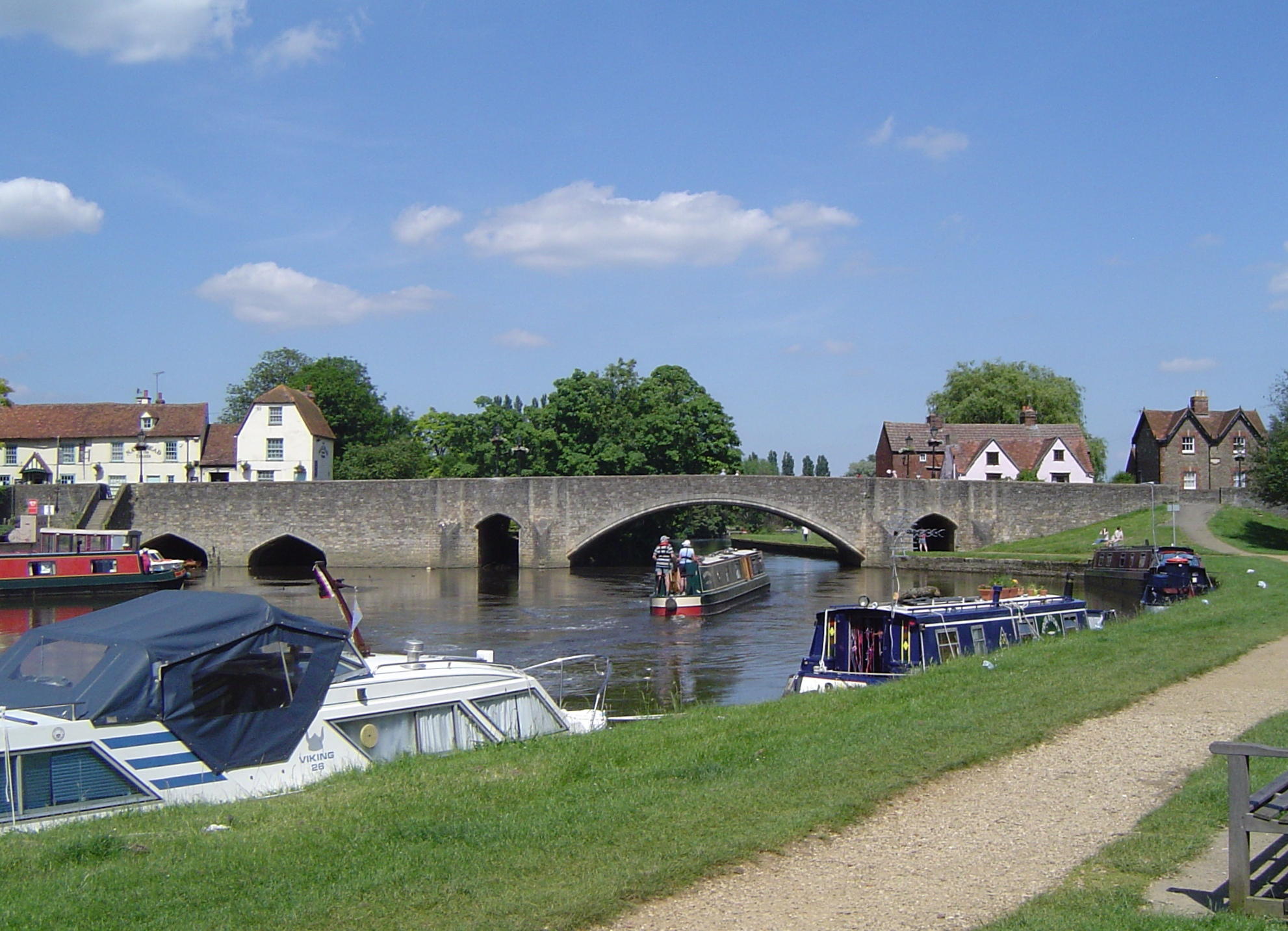
- Burford Bridge at Abingdon from downstream
- Coordinates: 51°40′06″N 1°16′45″W
- Heritage status: Grade II listed

Characteristics
- Design: Arch bridge
- Material: Stone
- Height: 13 feet 11 inches (4.24 m)
- No. of spans: 7
- Piers in water: 3

History
- Construction end: 1453, rebuilt 1927

Location
- Interactive map of Burford Bridge

Abingdon Bridge crosses the River Thames at the town of Abingdon, Oxfordshire, England. It carries the A415 road from Abingdon to Dorchester, Oxfordshire, over the reach of the Thames between Culham Lock and Abingdon Lock.

The bridge is actually two bridges, linked by Nag's Head Island. Abingdon Bridge is the northern part towards the town which has six arches and crosses the backwater and mill stream. The southern part is technically called Burford Bridge and has one main arch and four minor arches at the river and two minor arches on the floodplain. This crosses the main navigation channel. Furthermore, to complete the Thames crossing, Culham Bridge crossing the Swift Ditch should also be considered as an extension.

== History ==
Abingdon Bridge was begun in 1416 and completed in 1422, using local limestone quarried at Besselsleigh and Dry Sandford. The bridge was funded by Abingdon's religious guild, the Fraternity of the Holy Cross, and chiefly by two of the guild's members: a London merchant called William Hales and his wife Maud. The bridge replaced a ferry and its completion severely reduced trade at Wallingford.

In 1453 "three new arches" were added at the southern end of the bridge, this becoming known as Burford Bridge. This description makes no reference to the two pairs of much small arches to each side of the central arches. In 1548 during the Edwardine Reformation the Crown suppressed the Fraternity of the Holy Cross. In 1553 a royal charter founded Christ's Hospital to replace the guild and take over most of its property and functions, including custody and maintenance of Abingdon's bridges.

In 1790, when Abingdon Lock was opened, the Thames Navigation Commission had one of the arches closest to Nag's Head Island widened and raised to ease navigation. The width of the arch was increased to 20 feet (6.1 m), and the airdraught was increased by 4 feet (1.2 m) at the crown of the arch and 6 feet (1.8 m) at the sides. Enlargement changed the arch from a late medieval 15th-century pointed profile to a Georgian elliptical one.

Early in the 19th century the bridge was widened piecemeal. The Governors of Christ's Hospital had the Maud Hales Bridge widened in 1800 and the Hart Bridge in 1818–19. The Trustees of the Fyfield Turnpike had Culham Bridge and the remainder of Abingdon Bridge widened in 1829–30.

The bridge was rebuilt again in 1927, this time by the County Councils of Berkshire and Oxfordshire, with J. J. Leeming as resident engineer. Three of the early 15th-century arches were demolished and replaced with one wide span to further ease navigation.

== Local legend ==
There have been reported sightings of the ghostly apparition of an unidentified woman's head and arms beneath the water flowing under the bridge.

== See also ==
- Crossings of the River Thames

== Sources ==
- Jervoise, Edwyn (1930). The Ancient Bridges of the South of England. Vol. I. Westminster: The Architectural Press for the SPAB. pp. 7, 8.
- Leeming, J.J.; Salter, H.E. (1937). "Burford Bridge, Abingdon" (PDF). Oxoniensia. II. Oxford Architectural and Historical Society: 134–140. ISSN 0308-5562.
- Page, W.H.; Ditchfield, P.H., eds. (1924). A History of the County of Berkshire, Volume 4. Victoria County History. pp. 435–436.
- Thacker, Fred. S. (1968) [1920]. The Thames Highway. Vol. II: Locks and Weirs. Newton Abbott: David & Charles. pp. 158–160. SBN 7153-4233-9.

Next crossing upstream	River Thames	Next crossing downstream
Abingdon Lock (pedestrian)	Abingdon Bridge	Culham Lock bridges (pedestrian)
