= Oxford-Burcot Commission =

Managed part of England's River Thames

Thames Commission of Sewers Act 1605
- Act of Parliament
- Parliament of England
- Long title: An Acte for explanacion of the Statute of Sewers.
- Citation: 3 Jas. 1. c. 14
- Territorial extent: England and Wales

Dates
- Royal assent: 27 May 1606
- Commencement: 6 January 1606 (Note: Start of session.)
- Repealed: 1 August 1930
Other legislation
| Repealed by | Land Drainage Act 1930 |
| Relates to | Statute of Sewers 1531; New River Act 1605; Thames Navigation Act 1623 |

Status: Repealed

Text of statute as originally enacted

Thames Navigation Act 1623
- Act of Parliament
- Parliament of England
- Long title: An Act for making the river of Thames navigable for barges, boats and lighters, from the village of Bercot, in the county of Oxon, unto the university and city of Oxon.
- Citation: 21 Jas. 1. c. 32
- Territorial extent: England and Wales

Dates
- Royal assent: 29 May 1624
- Commencement: 12 February 1624
- Repealed: 17 August 1894
Other legislation
| Repeals/revokes | River Thames Act 1605 |
| Repealed by | Thames Conservancy Act 1894 |
| Relates to | Thames Commission of Sewers Act 1605; Thames and Isis Navigation Act 1750 |

Status: Repealed

Text of statute as originally enacted

The Oxford-Burcot Commission was the first commission concerned with the management of the River Thames, appointed by an act of Parliament, the Thames Commission of Sewers Act 1605 (3 Jas. 1. c. 14) to make the stretch of river from Burcot to Oxford navigable. The commission took responsibility for the management of the River Thames between Oxford and Burcot. It consisted of 18 members, including a representative each from Oxford city and from the University. However its work was irregular and by 1611 it had ceased altogether.

A second strengthened act of Parliament in 1624, the Thames Navigation Act 1623 (21 Jas. 1. c. 32), allowed for the appointment of eight commissioners of sewers. This was also known as the Oxford-Burcot Commission. It had the power to tax Oxford city and the university, to clean the river and to install locks and weirs. Iffley Lock, Sandford Lock and a lock on the Swift Ditch near the present Abingdon Lock were built in 1631. However, its work was slow and costly and the first barge did not reach Oxford until 1635.

Consequently Thames Navigation Commissioners were appointed in 1751 by a further act of Parliament under King George II, the Thames and Isis Navigation Act 1750 (24 Geo. 2. c. 8). This commission had similar powers but covered the entire length of the River Thames down to Staines.

== See also ==
- Locks on the River Thames
