= Abingdon Lock =

Lock on the River Thames, England

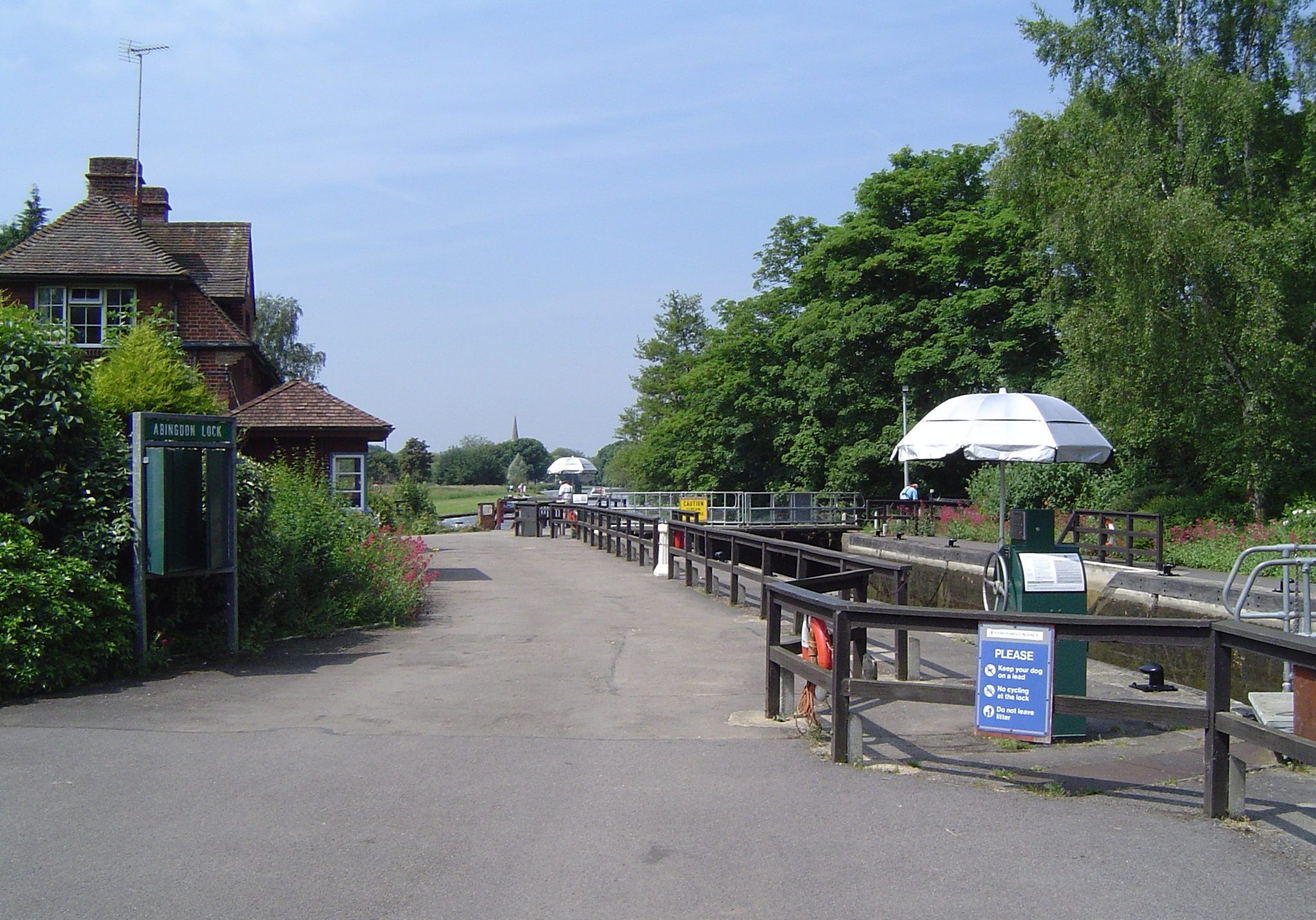
- Abingdon Lock with Abingdon downstream in the distance. The silver parasols are to shade the lock-keeper while operating the controls. Yellow boards on the gates indicate a high stream
- Interactive map of Abingdon Lock
- 51.670535°N 1.269202°W
- Waterway: River Thames
- County: Oxfordshire
- Maintained by: Environment Agency
- Operation: Hydraulic
- First built: 1790
- Latest built: 1905
- Length: 36.57 m (120 ft 0 in)
- Width: 5.71 m (18 ft 9 in)
- Fall: 1.89 m (6 ft 2 in)
- Above sea level: 167'
- Distance to Teddington Lock: 85 miles

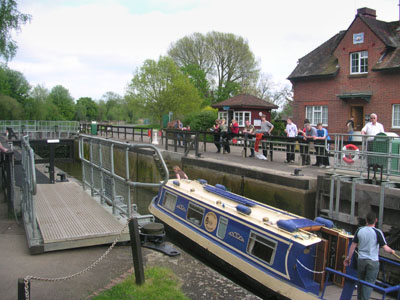
Abingdon Lock in action

Abingdon Lock is a lock on the River Thames in England, less than 1 mile east and upstream of Abingdon, Oxfordshire, on the opposite bank of the river. It was originally built in 1790 by the Thames Navigation Commission.

The weir runs across from the Abingdon side to the lock island, and has a pedestrian walkway across it.

According to a tablet above the front door, the current lock-keeper's house dates from 1928. Ice creams and refreshments have been sold from the door of the house for at least 30 years.

== History ==
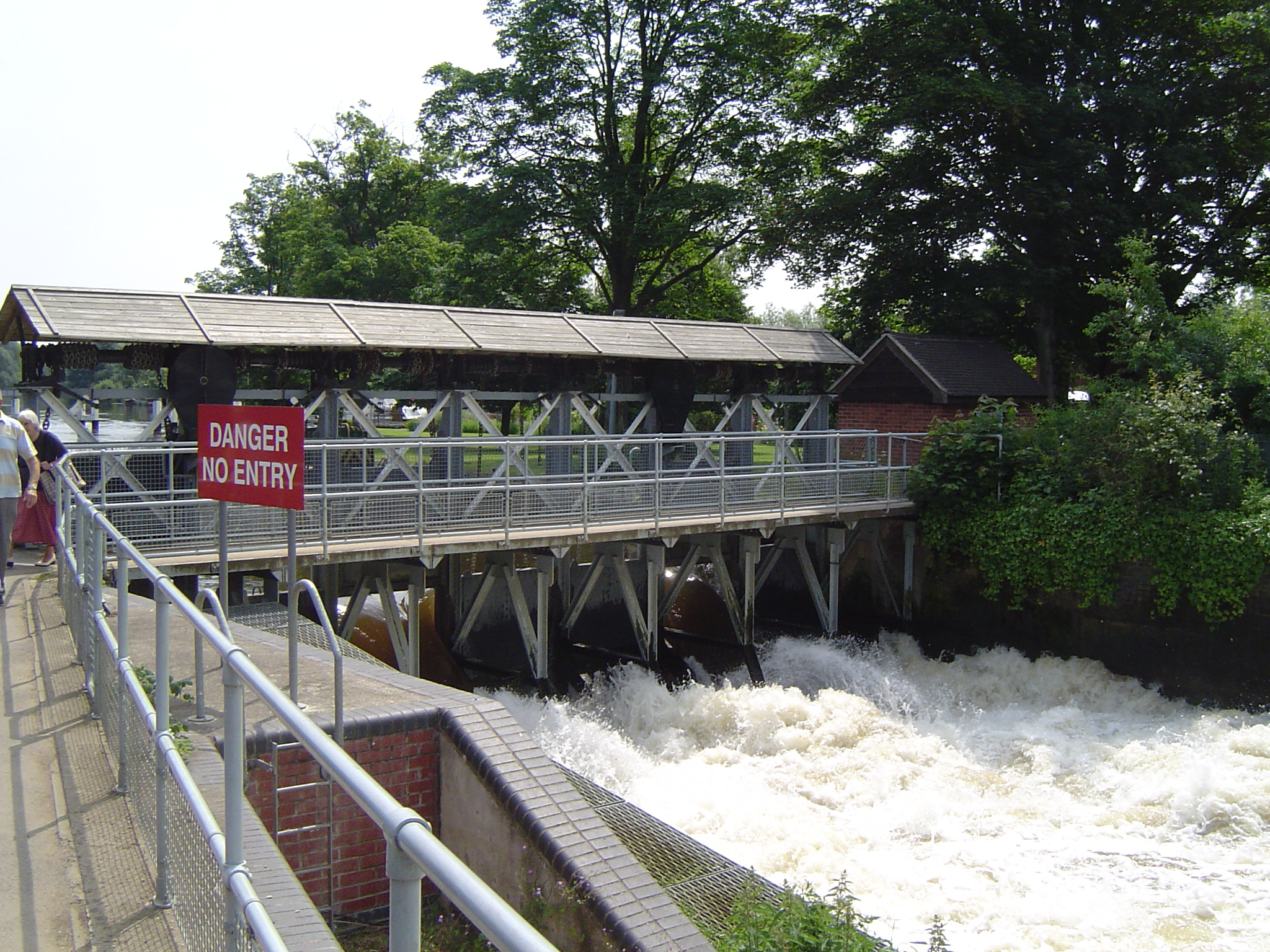
Walkway across Abingdon Weir.

The navigation route in the vicinity of Abingdon has been subject to change over the centuries. The Swift Ditch further to the east was the original course of the river Thames. The stream to the town was developed by the monks of Abingdon Abbey and the original weir is reputed to have been built by them during the 10th century. A pound lock was built on the Swift Ditch by the Oxford-Burcot Commission in 1635 making it then the navigation route. In 1788 several citizens of Abingdon wanted to divert navigation back to the current course, possibly taking into account the Wilts & Berks Canal which was to connect to the current navigation channel at Abingdon within ten years. As a result, Abingdon Lock was built near the town and opened at the end of 1790. The lock-keeper's house was reported in 1811 to be half a mile downstream of the lock - probably at the abbey millhouse.

== Access to the lock ==
The lock can be reached on a track heading north from Abingdon Bridge on the Andersey Island side. Alternatively it is possible to walk along the river from the town centre through Abbey Meadows and cross the weir.

== Reach above the lock ==
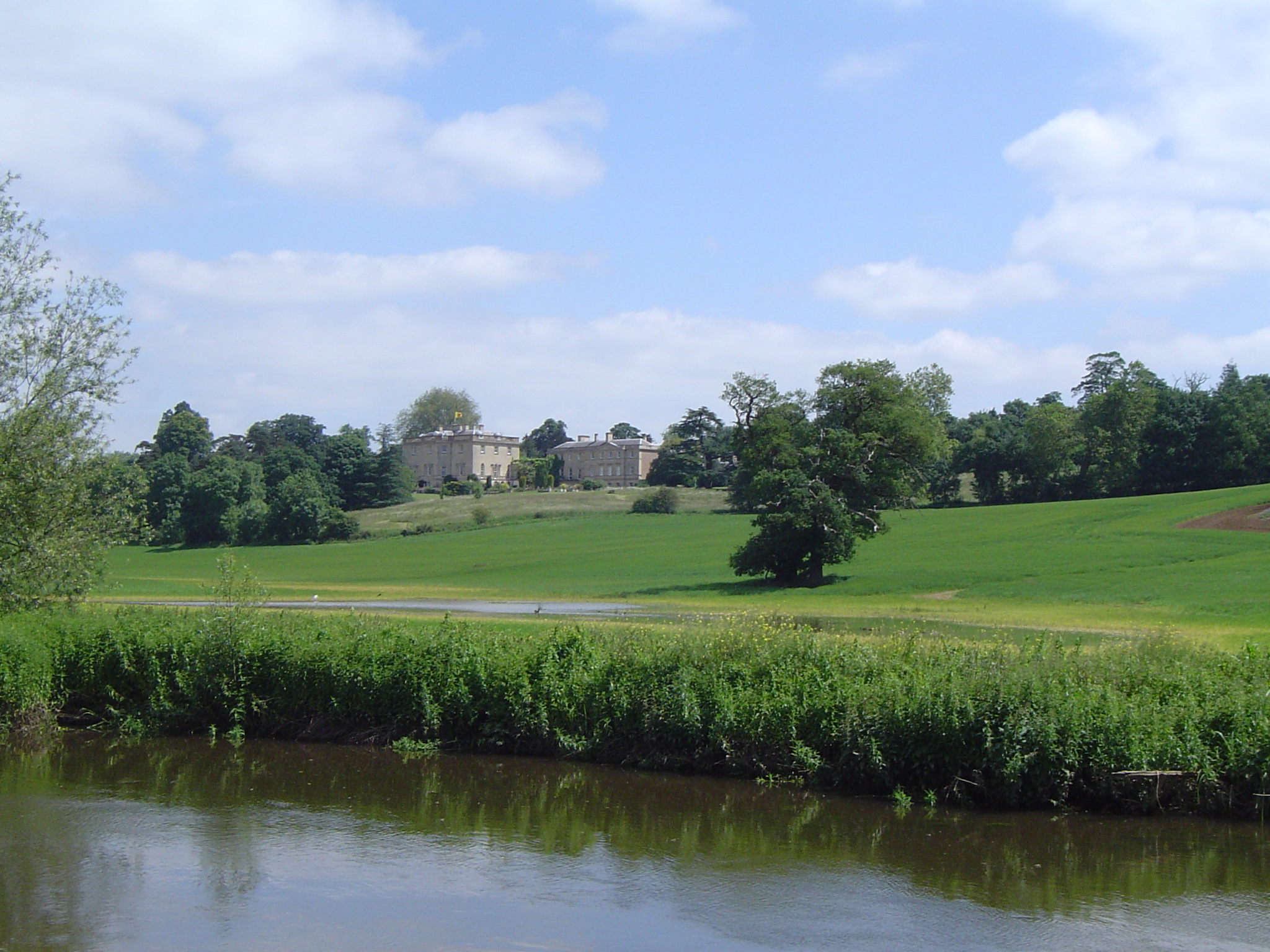
Nuneham House from the river

Immediately above the weir towards the town is the channel cut by the monks of Abingdon Abbey in the 10th century to provide navigation and mill water to the abbey itself. For the first few hundred yards the river has turned back on itself making the northern bank temporarily on the southern side. On this side of the lock is Andersey Island created by Swift Ditch. The first outflow is the site of the old lock, and the second channel is the original weir stream. Further upstream the Nuneham Railway Bridge (known as Black Bridge) carried the railway line to Oxford. Upstream of this the river turns northwards at the heavily wooded Lock Wood Island on the eastern bank with the old Radley Boathouse on the opposite side. Beyond the island the river is flanked by Nuneham Park, belonging to Nuneham House with the Jacobean Carfax Water Tower on a hill in the grounds ahead of the Palladian house itself. On the western side the terrain is open farmland with the town of Radley beyond. Near here and on that side on the river is the Radley College boathouse. On the opposite side, meadows for grazing cattle stretch up to Sandford Lock.

The Thames Path, which crosses the river at the lock, follows the western bank all the way to Sandford Lock.

== See also ==
- Locks on the River Thames
- Crossings of the River Thames

Next lock upstream	River Thames	Next lock downstream
Sandford Lock; 7.38 km (4.59 mi)	Abingdon Lock; Grid reference: SU506971	Culham Lock; 4.15 km (2.58 mi)
Next crossing upstream	River Thames	Next crossing downstream
Nuneham Railway Bridge	Abingdon Lock	Abingdon Bridge
Next crossing upstream	Thames Path	Next crossing downstream
"southern*" bank Osney Bridge	Abingdon Lock	northern bank Clifton Hampden Bridge

- Because of the river loop, the southern bank is here on the north side of the river
