= Thames Navigation Commission =

Managed London's River Thames (1751–1866)

The Thames Navigation Commission managed the River Thames in southern England from 1751 to 1866. In particular, they were responsible for installing or renovating many of the locks on the river in the 18th and early 19th centuries

== History ==
The first commission concerned with the River Thames was the Oxford-Burcot Commission, appointed in the Thames Commission of Sewers Act 1605. It took responsibility for the river between Oxford and Burcot.

Thames and Isis Navigation Act 1750
- Act of Parliament
- Parliament of Great Britain
- Long title: An Act for the better carrying on and regulating the Navigation of the Rivers Thames and Isis, from the City of London Westward, to the Town of Cricklade, in the County of Wilts.
- Citation: 24 Geo. 2. c. 8
- Territorial extent: Great Britain

Dates
- Royal assent: 22 March 1751
- Commencement: 17 January 1751 (Note: Start of session.)
- Repealed: 17 August 1894
Other legislation
Repeals/revokes	Thames Navigation Act 1694; Thames Navigation Act 1729
Repealed by	Thames Conservancy Act 1894
Relates to	Thames Navigation Act 1623

Status: Repealed

Text of statute as originally enacted

The Oxford-Burcot Commission was reasonably successful. Thus, the permanent Thames Navigation Commissioners were appointed through a further act under King George II in 1751, the Thames and Isis Navigation Act 1750 (24 Geo. 2. c. 8). This commission had similar powers covering the whole of the river down to Staines as far as a point marked by the London Stone; below this point the rights and responsibilities for managing the Thames were vested in the City of London Corporation. Earlier commissions had been created by acts as early as 1695, although these had limited terms.

The Thames Conservancy was established in 1857 to take over duties from the City of London because of falling revenue from boat traffic. Not long after, in 1866, it was considered best to have the navigation of the whole river under a single management, so the Thames Navigation Commission was subsumed by the Thames Conservancy.

== Locks built by the Thames Navigation Commission ==
- Boulter's Lock (1772)
- Hambleden Lock (1773)
- Hurley Lock (1773)
- Marlow Lock (1773)
- Marsh Lock (1773)
- Shiplake Lock (1773)
- Sonning Lock (1773)
- Temple Lock (1773)
- Caversham Lock (1778)
- Mapledurham Lock (1778)
- Cleeve Lock (1787)
- Goring Lock (1787)
- Whitchurch Lock (1787)
- Benson Lock (1788)
- Day's Lock (1789)
- Abingdon Lock (1790)
- Buscot Lock (1790)
- Godstow Lock (1790)
- Osney Lock (1790)
- Rushey Lock (1790)
- St John's Lock (1790)
- Pinkhill Lock (1791)
- Romney Lock (1798)
- Culham Lock (1809)
- Bell Weir Lock (1817)
- Clifton Lock (1822)
- Old Windsor Lock (1822)
- Cookham Lock (1830)
- Bray Lock (1845)
- Boveney Lock (1838)

== See also ==
- Edward Loveden Loveden
- Thames Conservancy
