= Burcot, Oxfordshire =

Hamlet in Oxfordshire, England

Coordinates: 51°39′36″N 1°11′10″W

Burcot
- Hamlet
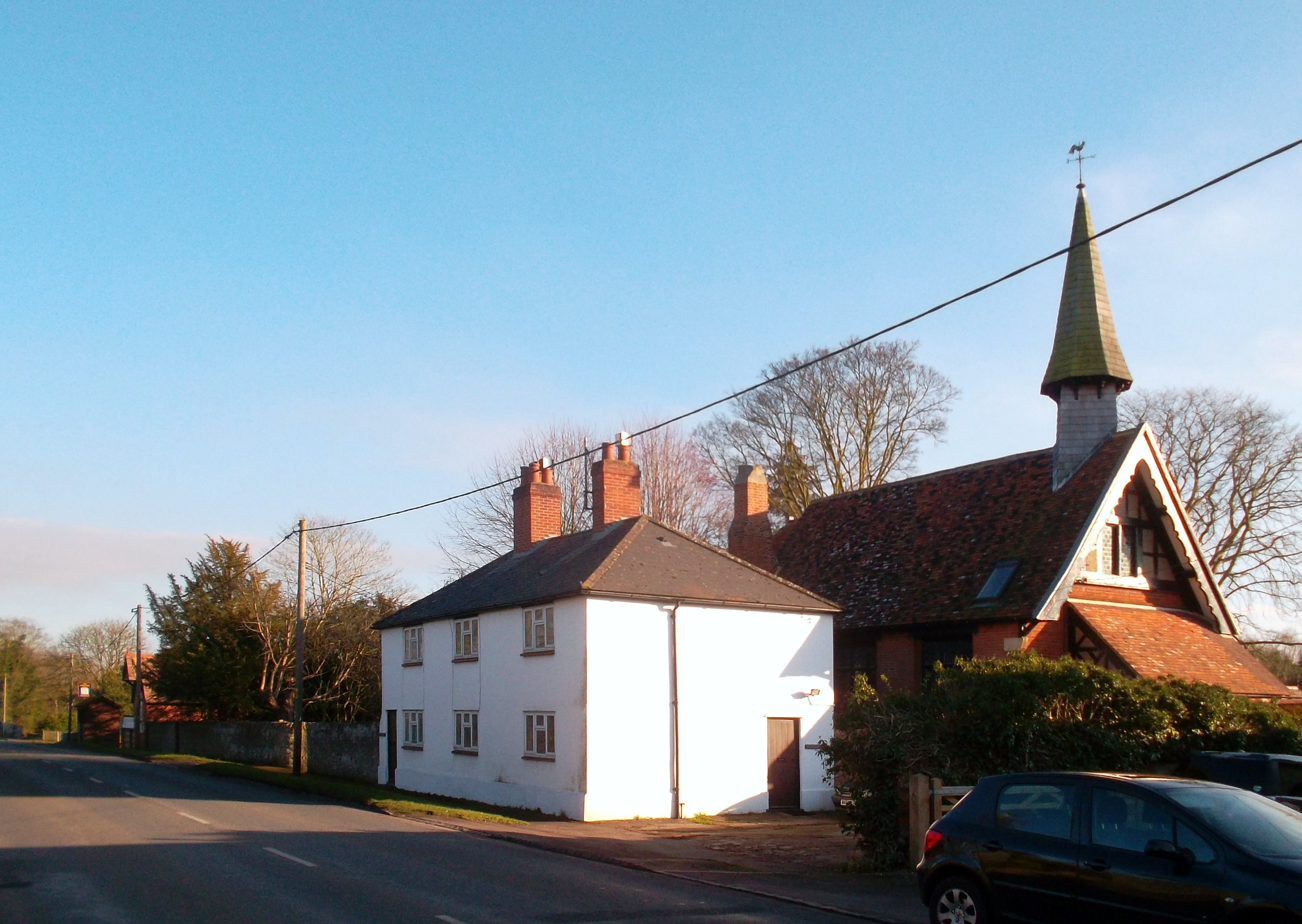

- Location within Oxfordshire
- OS grid reference: SU564960
- Civil parish: Clifton Hampden
- District: South Oxfordshire
- Shire county: Oxfordshire
- Region: South East
- Country: England
- Sovereign state: United Kingdom
- Post town: ABINGDON
- Postcode district: OX14
- Dialling code: 01865
- Police: Thames Valley
- Fire: Oxfordshire
- Ambulance: South Central
- UK Parliament: Didcot and Wantage

Burcot is a hamlet in the civil parish of Clifton Hampden, in the South Oxfordshire district of Oxfordshire, England. It is on the left bank of the River Thames. In 1931 the parish had a population of 187.

== Heritage ==
Burcot in the 17th century was an important trans-shipment point on the Thames. The river at that time had become almost unnavigable between Oxford and Burcot, so that goods for Oxford had to be unloaded at Burcot and taken on by road. This led in 1605 to the formation of the Oxford-Burcot Commission, with the task of improving navigation.

The village, lying mainly between the main road and the Thames, became a desirable Thames-side residential area in the late 19th century. Almost all the earlier housing was pulled down. The only survivors from before the Victorian era are the Grade II listed Old Cottage, thought to be Tudor, The Tudor Cottage and the 16th-century pub premises. No other building dates from before 1888. The poet laureate John Masefield lived at Burcote Brook from 1932 until his death in 1967. Shortly afterwards, the house burnt down and was replaced by a Cheshire Home, which is named after him.

== Governance ==
The village belongs to Clifton Hampden parish. It has been part of the South Oxfordshire local-government district since Henley Rural District was incorporated into it in 1974.

Burcott was formerly in the parish of Dorchester. In 1866, Burcott became a separate civil parish. On 1 April 1932, that parish was abolished and merged with Clifton Hampden.

== Facilities ==
Burcot lies on the main road from Dorchester to Abingdon, now the A415. Bus services are confined to schooldays.

The village has a thatch-roofed pub, The Chequers, which has developed into a restaurant. The nearest retail facilities are at the shopping centre in Dorchester, less than two miles away.

The former school is now a private house. The nearest primary school and church are at Clifton Hampden.
