= A415 road =

Road in England

A415

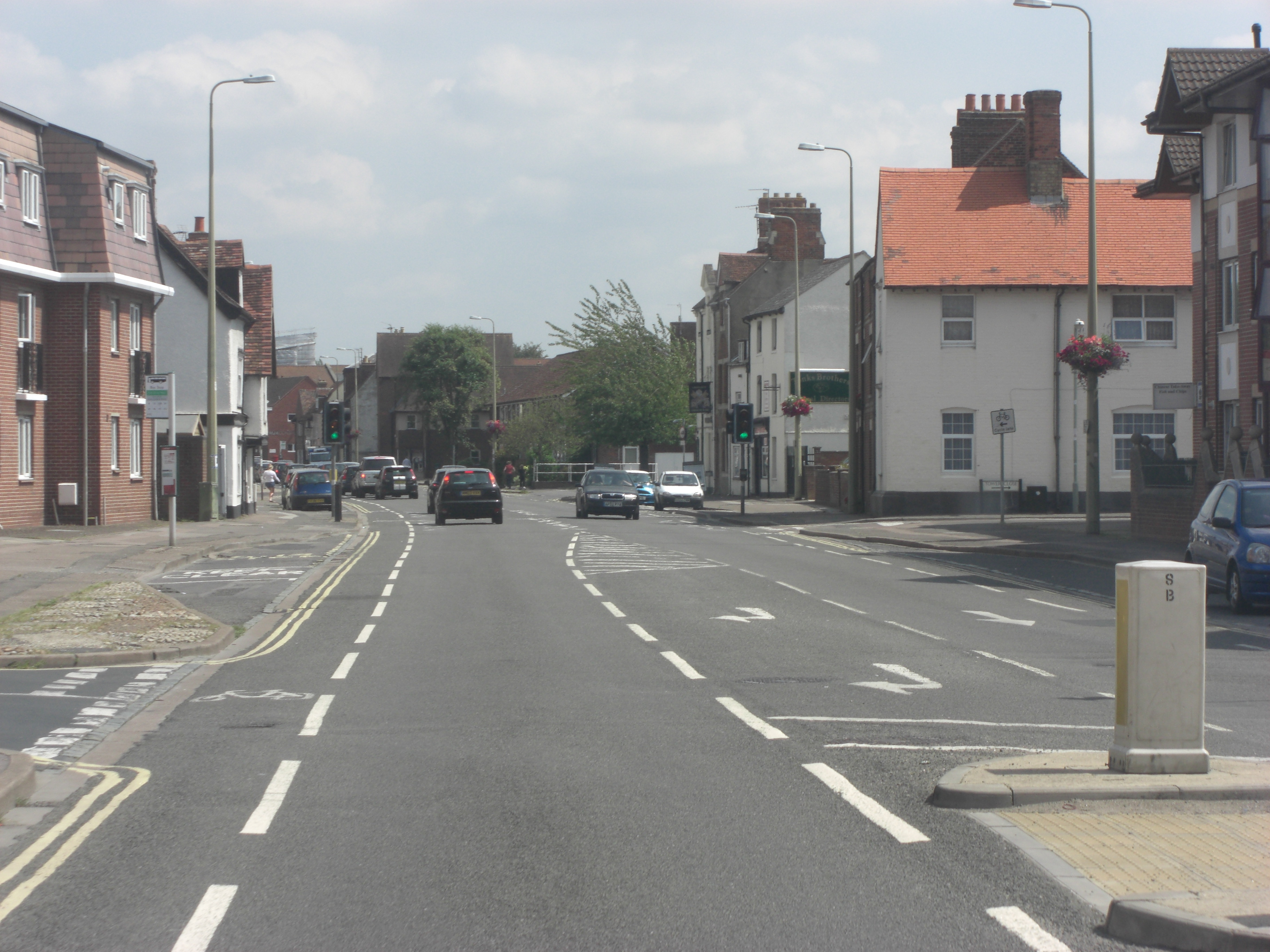
- A415 Ock Street

Location
- Country: United Kingdom
- Constituent country: England

Road network
- Roads in the United Kingdom; Motorways; A and B road zones
← A414	→ A416

The A415 is a British A road which runs from the A4074 at Berinsfield, Oxfordshire (51.6591°N 1.1762°W), to Witney (51.7852°N 1.4965°W), passing through Abingdon, Marcham and Kingston Bagpuize. It crosses the River Thames twice, at Abingdon Bridge and Newbridge.

== History ==
When UK roads were first classified in 1922, the A415 started at a junction with the A4 just west of Maidenhead in Berkshire. It ran through Henley-on-Thames and Benson to Shillingford where it joined the then A42. It left the A42 a mile west at Dorchester. In the 1930s the section from Maidenhead to Shillingford became part of the A423. It is now part of the A4130 and the A4074.

In the 1980s, when the Dorchester Bypass was opened, the start of the A415 was switched to the western end of the bypass, at Berinsfield.
