= McNaughton =

McNaughton or MacNaughton is a surname. Notable people with the surname include:

== MacNaughton ==
- Alan Macnaughton (1903–1999), Canadian parliamentarian and Speaker of the Canadian House of Commons
- Anne MacNaughton, American poet
- Charles MacNaughton, Canadian politician
- Ian MacNaughton (1925–2002), television producer/director associated with Monty Python
- John 'Half Hung MacNaghten', or MacNaughton, Irish figure of 18th-century romantic folklore
- John A. MacNaughton (1945–2013), Canadian businessman
- John H. MacNaughton (1929-2022), American Episcopal bishop
- Lukas MacNaughton, (born 1995), footballer
- Malcolm Macnaughton (disambiguation)
  - Malcolm Macnaughton (obstetrician) (1925–2016), Scottish obstetrician, gynaecologist, and academic
  - Malcolm Macnaughton (bishop) (born 1957), British Anglican bishop
- Robert MacNaughton (born 1966), American child actor

== McNaughton ==
- Andrew McNaughton (1887–1966), Canadian army officer, politician and diplomat
- Ava McNaughton (born 2004), American ice hockey player
- Brian McNaughton (1935–2004), American writer
- Bruce McNaughton, Canadian neuroscientist
- Christopher McNaughton (born 1982), German-American basketball player
- Colin McNaughton (born 1951), English writer and illustrator of children's books
- Daniel McNaughton (1851–1925), Canadian politician
- Donald McNaughton (New York politician) (1830–1893), New York politician
- Duncan McNaughton (1910–1998), Canadian Olympic athlete
- Duncan Alexander McNaughton (1877–1962), Canadian politician
- George McNaughton (ice hockey) (1897–1991), Canadian professional ice hockey player
- George Matthew McNaughton (1893–1966), British civil engineer
- Gordon McNaughton (1910–1942), American Major League Baseball pitcher
- Gus McNaughton (1881–1969), English film actor
- James McNaughton (disambiguation), several people
- John McNaughton (born 1950), American film director
- John McNaughton (government official) (1921–1967), former United States Assistant Secretary of Defense and advisor to Robert McNamara
- Jon McNaughton, American painter
- Kevin McNaughton (born 1982), Scottish soccer player
- Margaret McNaughton, Canadian writer and historian
- Mark S. McNaughton, American politician from Pennsylvania
- Paul McNaughton (1952–2022), Irish rugby union and soccer player
- Robert McNaughton (1924—2014), American computer scientist
- Samuel J. McNaughton (1939–2024), American ecologist and Stanford University professor
- Sandy McNaughton (born 1953), Scottish footballer
- Terence McNaughton (born 1964), Irish hurling manager
- William John McNaughton (1926–2020), American Catholic missionary and bishop in South Korea

== See also ==
- Macnaughtan, a surname
- Macnaghten (disambiguation)
- Clan Macnaghten (sometimes spelt as MacNachten or MacNaughton), a Scottish clan
- MacNaughton Cup, a collegiate ice-hockey trophy in the United States
- MacNaughton Mountain, located in Essex County, New York
- Bernice MacNaughton High School, a high school in Moncton, New Brunswick, Canada
- John Patrick McNaughton Barn, in Ottawa County, Oklahoma
- R. D. McNaughton Building, Moosomin, Saskatchewan, Canada
- McNaughton, Wisconsin, an unincorporated community in the United States
- Daniel M'Naghten, British murderer
  - M'Naghten Rules, first serious attempt to codify the insanity defense in criminal cases
- Lady Macnaghten (various spellings), ship taking settlers from Britain to Australia
- Mount McNaughton (Canada), a mountain in British Columbia, Canada
