= Humphrey Southern =

British Anglican bishop (born 1960)

The Right Reverend Humphrey Southern
- Principal of Ripon College Cuddesdon
- Church: Church of England
- Appointed: April 2015
- Predecessor: Martyn Percy
- Successor: Harriet Harris
- Previous post: Bishop of Repton (2007–2015)

Orders
- Ordination: 1987
- Consecration: 1 May 2007 by Rowan Williams

Personal details
- Born: 17 September 1960 (age 66)
- Denomination: Anglican
- Spouse: Emma
- Children: Two daughters (Laura and Kate)
- Education: Christ Church, Oxford

Humphrey Ivo John Southern (born 17 September 1960) is a British Anglican bishop. From 2007 to 2015, he was Bishop of Repton, a suffragan bishop in the Diocese of Derby. From 2015 to 2025, he was principal of Ripon College Cuddesdon, an Anglican theological college.

== Early life ==
Southern was born on 17 September 1960. He was educated at Harrow School, an all-boys public school in London, England. He studied history at Christ Church, Oxford and graduated from the University of Oxford with a Bachelor of Arts (BA) degree in 1982. After a period of study at Ripon College Cuddesdon he was ordained in 1987.

== Ordained ministry ==
Southern was ordained in the Church of England as a deacon in 1986 and as a priest in 1987. His career began with curacies at St Margaret's, Rainham (1986–1990) and St Mary's, St Aiden & St Nathanael Walton-on-the-Hill, Liverpool (1990–1992). After these, he was Vicar of Hale (1992–1996), then Team Rector of the same (1996–1999) and also of Badshot Lea (1997–1999). At the same time he was ecumenical officer for the Diocese of Guildford (1992–1999). He was then Team Rector of Tisbury (1999–2001) and of the Nadder Valley Team Ministry (2001–2007), both in the Diocese of Salisbury. He was also Rural Dean of Chalke (2000–2007) and an Honorary Canon and Prebendary of Salisbury Cathedral (2006–2007).

=== Episcopal ministry ===
Southern was consecrated a bishop on 31 May 2007 at St Paul's Cathedral and installed as Bishop of Repton on 9 June 2007. On 18 November 2014, it was announced that he would succeed Martyn Percy as Principal of Ripon College Cuddesdon. He took up the appointment on 1 April 2015. He has also been an assistant bishop in the Diocese of Oxford since 2015. He retired as principal at the end of 2025 and was succeeded by Harriet Harris.

== Marriage and adult life ==
A long-term keeper of the English Bull Terrier which he and his family take on walks, Southern is married to Emma with two daughters.

== Styles ==
- Humphrey Southern Esq (1960–1987)
- The Revd Humphrey Southern (1987–2006)
- The Revd Canon Humphrey Southern (2006–2007)
- The Rt Revd Humphrey Southern (2007–present)

Church of England titles
Preceded by David Hawtin	Bishop of Repton; 2007–2015	Succeeded by Jan McFarlane
Preceded by Martyn Percy	Principal of Ripon College Cuddesdon; 2015–2025	Succeeded by Harriet Harris
