= David Hawtin =

Bishop of Repton, England

The Rt Revd David Hawtin MA(Oxon)
- Bishop of Repton
- Diocese: Diocese of Derby
- In office: 1999–2006
- Predecessor: Henry Richmond
- Successor: Humphrey Southern
- Other posts: Honorary assistant bishop in Sheffield (2006–present); Archdeacon of Newark (1992–1999)

Orders
- Ordination: 1967 (deacon); 1968 (priest)
- Consecration: 1999

Personal details
- Born: 7 June 1943 (age 83)
- Denomination: Anglican
- Spouse: Elizabeth Uden (m. 1968; d. 2010)
- Children: 1 son; 2 daughters
- Education: Keble College, Oxford

David Christopher Hawtin (born 7 June 1943) was the fourth Bishop of Repton from 1999 to 2006; and from then on an assistant bishop within the Diocese of Sheffield.

== Early life and education ==
Hawtin was born on 7 June 1943. He was educated at Keble College, Oxford.

== Ordained ministry ==
Hawtin was ordained in 1967. He began his career with curacies in North East England, including at St Peter's Church, Stockton-on-Tees. After this, he was: Priest in charge of St Andrew's, Gateshead; Rector of Washington, Tyne and Wear; and finally, before his elevation to the episcopate, Archdeacon of Newark from 1992 to 1999. After 7 years as the suffragan bishop of the Diocese of Derby, he retired to Sheffield in 2006.

Church of England titles
Preceded by Henry Richmond	Bishop of Repton; 1999–2006	Succeeded by Humphrey Southern
