= Malcolm Macnaughton =

Malcolm Macnaughton may refer to:

- Malcolm Macnaughton (obstetrician) (1925–2016), Scottish obstetrician, gynaecologist, and academic
- Malcolm Macnaughton (bishop) (born 1957), British Anglican bishop
