= Henry Richmond (bishop) =

The Right Reverend Henry Richmond MLitt MA(Dubl) BTh
- Bishop of Repton
- Diocese: Diocese of Derby
- In office: 1985 – 1999 (retired)
- Predecessor: Stephen Verney
- Successor: David Hawtin
- Other posts: Honorary assistant chaplain at Christ Church Cathedral, Oxford (2006–2017); Honorary assistant bishop in Oxford (1999–2017)

Orders
- Ordination: 1963 (deacon); 1964 (priest)
- Consecration: 30 January 1986 by Robert Runcie

Personal details
- Born: 6 January 1936
- Died: 16 March 2017 (aged 81)
- Denomination: Anglican
- Parents: Frank & Lena
- Spouse: Caroline Berent (m. 1966)
- Children: 2 sons; 1 daughter
- Profession: Academic
- Education: Trinity College, Dublin

Francis Henry Arthur Richmond (6 January 1936 – 16 March 2017) was the third Bishop of Repton from 1985 to 1999; and from then on, in retirement, an honorary assistant bishop within the Diocese of Oxford.

Richmond was educated at Trinity College, Dublin. Ordained in 1964, he began his career with a curacy at Woodlands, in Yorkshire. after which he was: a chaplain at Sheffield Cathedral; Vicar of St George's, Sheffield (during which time he was also a University Chaplain); and finally, before his elevation to the episcopate, Warden of Lincoln Theological College. He was ordained and consecrated a bishop (thereby taking up his suffragan See) on 30 January 1986, by Robert Runcie, Archbishop of Canterbury, at Southwark Cathedral. After 14 years as the Derby Suffragan he retired to Oxford in 1999.

He died on 16 March 2017 at the age of 81.

Church of England titles
Preceded by Stephen Verney	Bishop of Repton; 1985–1999	Succeeded by David Hawtin
