= Alan Weston =

English cricketer

Personal information
- Full name: Alan Gibbons Weston
- Born: 30 September 1907; Leicester, Leicestershire, England
- Died: 10 June 1997 (aged 89); Blythe Bridge, Staffordshire, England
- Batting: Right-handed

Domestic team information
- Years: Team
- 1933–1934: Leicestershire

Career statistics
Competition	First-class
Matches	5
Runs scored	72
Batting average	9.00
100s/50s	–/–
Top score	31*
Balls bowled	–
Wickets	–
Bowling average	–
5 wickets in innings	–
10 wickets in match	–
Best bowling	–
Catches/stumpings	–/–
- Source: Cricinfo, 14 February 2013

Alan Gibbons Weston (30 September 1907 – 10 June 1997) was an English cricketer. Weston was a right-handed batsman. He was born at Leicester, Leicestershire.

Weston made his first-class debut for Leicestershire against Warwickshire at Edgbaston in the 1933 County Championship, with him making two further first-class appearances in that season against Sussex and Surrey. The following season he made two first-class appearances against the touring Australians and Lancashire in the County Championship. In his five first-class matches for Leicestershire, Weston scored 72 runs at an average of 9.00, with a high score of 31 not out.

He died at Blythe Bridge, Staffordshire on 10 June 1997.
