= Claw beaker =

Type of glass cup in archaeology

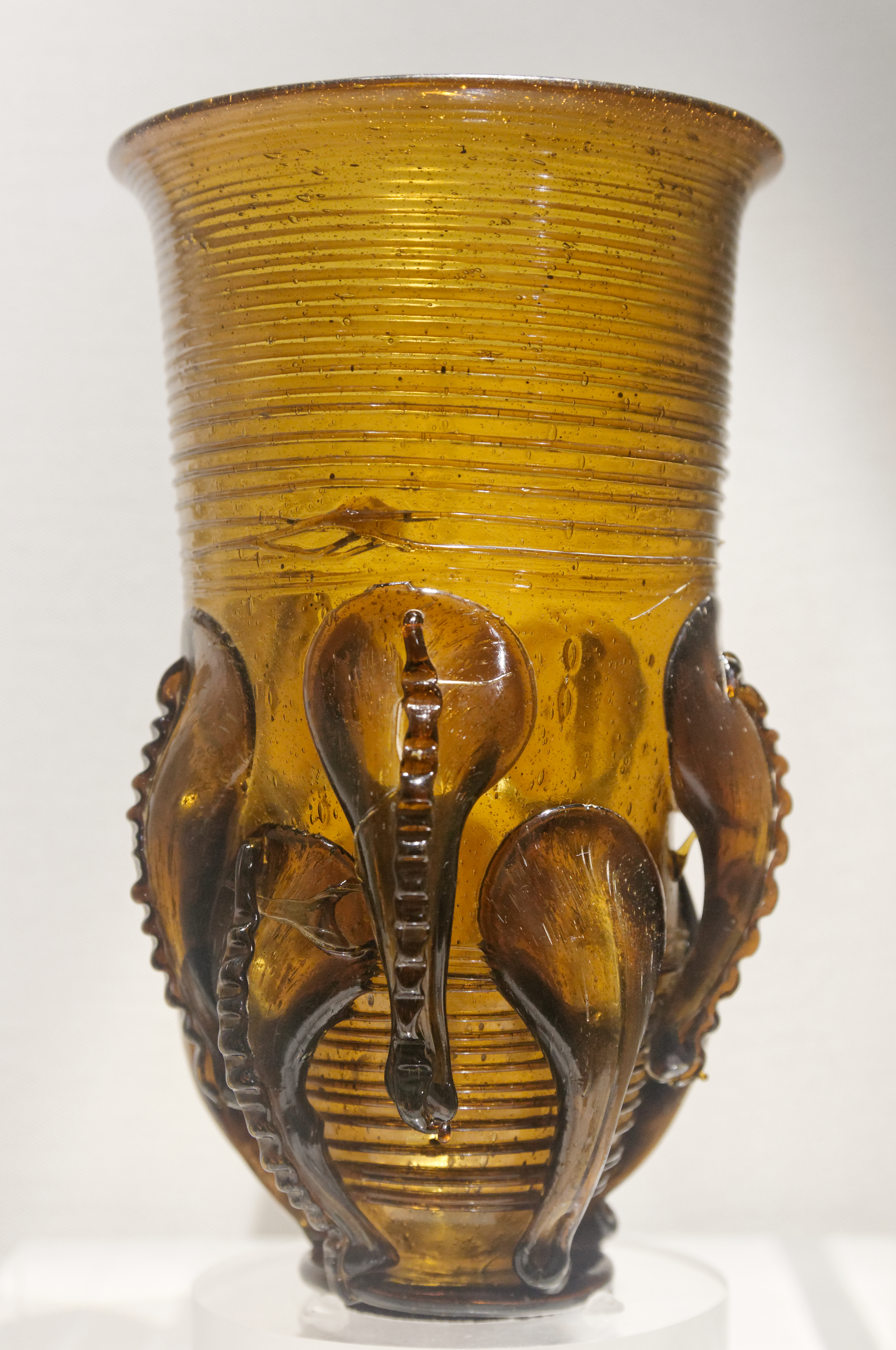
Claw beaker from the Ringlemere barrow, c. 400 to 600 AD.

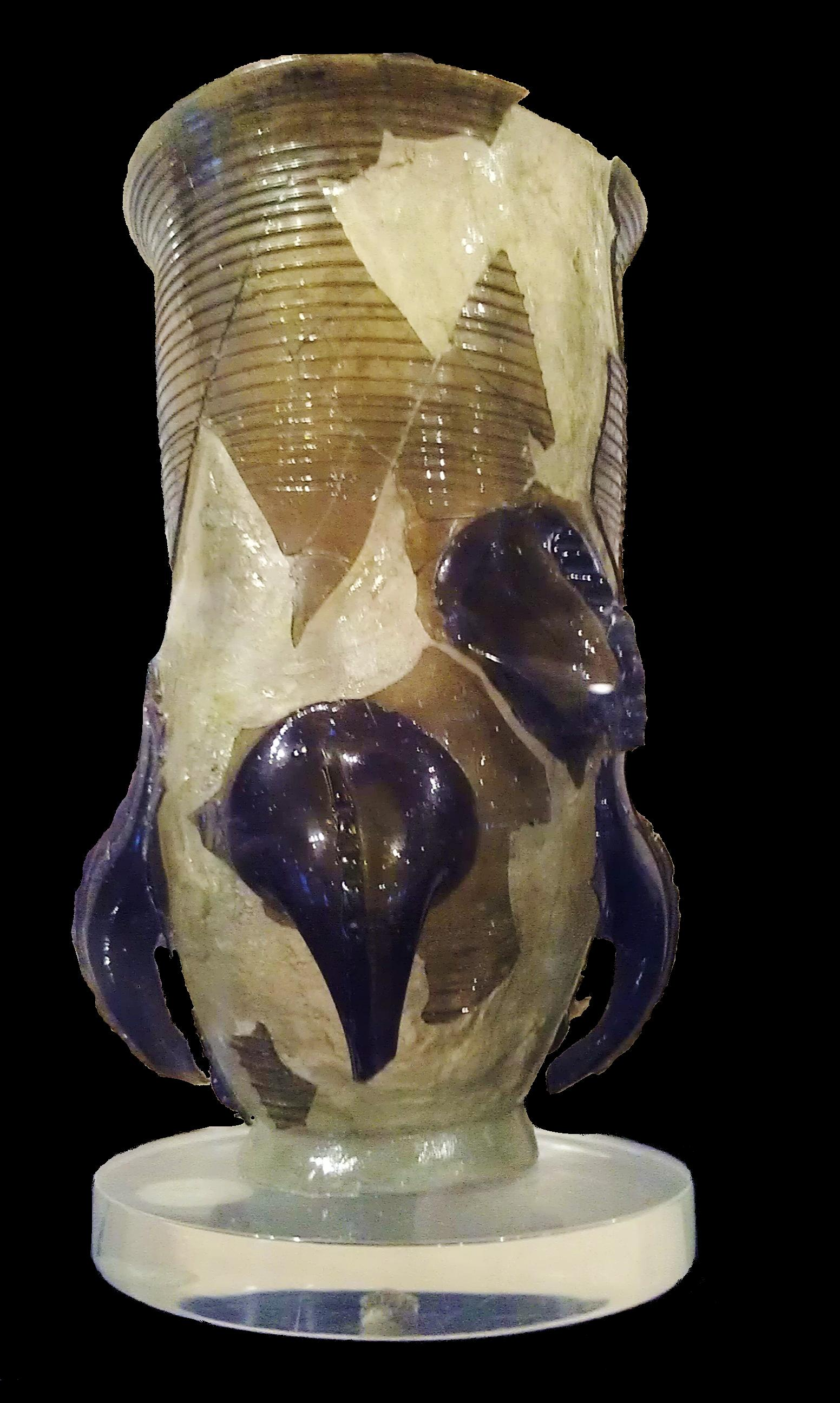
Claw beaker found at the Snape Anglo-Saxon Cemetery.

A claw beaker is a name given by archaeologists to a type of glass cup or drinking vessel often found as a grave good in 6th and 7th century AD Frankish and Anglo-Saxon burials.

Found in northern France, eastern England, Germany and the Low Countries, it is a plain conical beaker with small, claw-like handles or lugs protruding from the sides made from gobs of molten glass applied to the beaker's walls. The main centre of manufacturing was probably in modern-day Germany and the glass was sometimes tinted brown, blue or yellow. However, many examples in Anglo-Saxon glass seem to have been made in Britain.
