= Harriet Harris (academic) =

British academic and Anglican priest (born 1968)

The Reverend Harriet Harris MBE FRSE
- Principal of Ripon College Cuddesdon
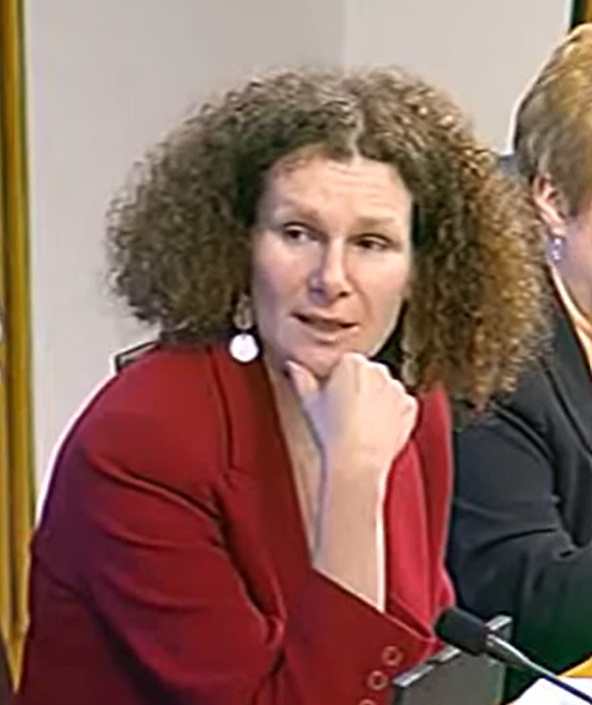
- Harris gives evidence on proposed legislation to a Scottish Parliament committee in 2015.
- Church: Church of England; Scottish Episcopal Church
- Appointed: 2026
- Predecessor: Humphrey Southern
- Previous post: Chaplain of the University of Edinburgh (2010–2025)

Orders
- Ordination: 2000 (deacon); 2001 (priest)

Personal details
- Born: 1968 (age 57–58)
- Denomination: Anglican
- Education: Oriel College, Oxford (BA); University of Oxford (DPhil)

Harriet Anne Harris MBE FRSE (born 1968) is an English theologian and Anglican priest. As a theologian, her 1998 monograph Fundamentalism and Evangelicals received multiple reviews. Since January 2026, she has been the principal of Ripon College Cuddesdon, a Church of England theological college. Before that, from 2010 to 2025, she was university chaplain and head of the multifaith chaplaincy service at the University of Edinburgh.

== Early life and education ==
Harris was born in 1968. She studied at Oriel College, Oxford, graduating with a Bachelor of Arts (BA) degree in 1990. She holds a Doctor of Philosophy (DPhil) degree from the University of Oxford. She undertook training for holy orders at St Stephen's House, Oxford.

== Ordained ministry ==
Harris was ordained in the Church of England as a deacon in 2000 and as a priest in 2001. She began her ministry in the Diocese of Oxford as assistant curate at the University Church of St Mary the Virgin in Oxford. She was also chaplain to Wadham College, Oxford, leaving her parish ministry to become the full-time chaplain in 2006.

She was appointed university chaplain at the University of Edinburgh in 2010. From 2010 to 2012, she additionally served as a non-stipendiary minister of St Mary's Cathedral, Edinburgh, the cathedral of the Scottish Episcopal Church's Diocese of Edinburgh. During her tenure as university chaplain, she increased the chaplaincy staff from three and half to nine and appointed more than 40 honorary chaplains and listeners, including the appointment of chaplains to serve the Daoist, humanist and pagan traditions as well as those who promote mindfulness and serve LGBTQ persons. For her service to multifaith education and community cohesion, she was appointed Member of the Order of the British Empire (MBE) in the 2017 New Year Honours, and elected a Fellow of the Royal Society of Edinburgh (FRSE) in 2022.

While at Edinburgh, she served as a priest in the Scottish Episcopal Church (SEC). As convenor of the SEC's Doctrine Committee, she produced a paper on marriage for the SEC's 2015 General Synod that paved the way for the church's 2017 vote to authorize same-sex marriages.

== Academic career ==
In addition to her chaplaincy work, Harris has taught theology at Oxford, the University of Exeter, and Edinburgh. Her academic research focus includes the legacy of analytic philosophy and the relevance of spirituality to religious epistemology.

In 1998, she published Fundamentalism and Evangelicals, which according to her University of Edinburgh biography was the best-selling entry in the Oxford Theological Monograph series. The book was intended to demonstrate that evangelicalism is a perpetuation of fundamentalism, not a departure from it. Scottish Biblical scholar James Barr described it as "brilliantly distinguished ... and incisively argued", adding that fundamentalism had been extensively studied in its political and social aspects but less so in its theological aspects, a gap he said Harris addressed. American historian D. G. Hart critiqued the lack of new historical insights as well as the absence of "a sustained treatment of revelation or theological hermeneutics".

In January 2026, Harris succeeded Humphrey Southern as principal of Ripon College Cuddesdon.

== Bibliography ==
=== Authored books ===
- Harris, Harriet A. (1998). Fundamentalism and Evangelicals. Oxford: Oxford University Press. ISBN 9780191701016.
- Harris, Harriet A. (2002). Faith Without Hostages: The Cross and Resurrection in Our Lives Today. London: SPCK. ISBN 9780281054794.
- Davie, Martin; Harris, Harriet A.; Hill, Christopher; Platten, Stephen (2011). Avis, Paul D. L. (ed.). The Journey of Christian Initiation: Theological and Pastoral Perspectives. London: Church House Publishing. ISBN 9780715142370. OCLC 701021126.

=== Edited books ===
- Harris, Harriet A.; Shaw, Jane, eds. (2004). The Call for Women Bishops. London: SPCK. ISBN 9780281056217.
- Harris, Harriet A.; Insole, Christopher J., eds. (2005). Faith and Philosophical Analysis: The Influence of Analytical Philosophy on Philosophy of Religion. Farnham, UK: Ashgate. ISBN 9781315255521.
- Harris, Harriet A., ed. (2011). God, Goodness and Philosophy. Farnham, UK: Ashgate. ISBN 9781409428527.
- Harris, Harriet A.; Harrison, Victoria, eds. (2023). Atheisms: The Philosophy of Non-Belief. London: Routledge. ISBN 9781032470986.

Church of England titles
Preceded by Humphrey Southern	Principal of Ripon College Cuddesdon; 2026–present	Incumbent
