= Forsbrook Pendant =

Piece of Anglo-Saxon jewellery found in Forsbrook, Staffordshire, England

Coordinates: 52.972091°N 2.052029°W

- Year: 7th century AD
- Type: Pendant
- Medium: Gold; Garnets; Blue glass
- Dimensions: 36 mm diameter (1.4 in)
- Location: British Museum
- Owner: British Museum
- Accession: M&LA 1879.7–14.1

The Forsbrook Pendant is a piece of Anglo-Saxon jewellery found in Forsbrook, Staffordshire, England and sold to the British Museum in 1879. It is a 7th-century setting of a 4th-century gold Roman coin in gold cellwork with garnet and blue glass inlays.

== Description and context ==
The pendant, 36 millimetres (1.4 in) in diameter, comprises a 7th-century setting for a gold solidus (coin) of Valentinian II (375–392 AD), indicating that the coin was over 200 years old when the pendant was made. The coin, whose obverse is displayed, is surrounded by a circular frame containing cloisonné gold with garnet and blue glass inlay, on a cross-hatched gold foil background, with the inlay continuing round the suspension loop, where it terminates with two stylised animal heads meeting under the suspension loop. The side edge of the frame is decorated with three strands of gold wire, each end terminating with a serpent heads next to the suspension loop. The back of the pendant is plain, apart from the suspension loop.

There are a number of similar Anglo-Saxon pendants setting Roman or Byzantine coins, which appear to have been mostly worn by women.

The majority of Anglo-Saxon jewellery in the 6th-7th century made intensive use of flat, cut almandine garnets in gold and red garnet cloisonné (or cellwork) but occasionally glass was also cut and inset as gems, as in some of the pieces from Sutton Hoo. The glass colours used were almost entirely limited to blue and green. A number of pieces in the Staffordshire Hoard also mix blue glass with garnet inlays. The backing of patterned gold foil, which serves to increase the light reflected back through the thin garnet slices, is typical of cellwork jewellery and also found in these two deposits, which are the largest survivals of the type.

Chemical analysis of such glass has revealed that they are a soda-lime-silica glass, but with a lower iron and manganese oxide content than the high iron, manganese and titanium glass used to make Anglo-Saxon vessels. The similarity between the composition of the glass inlays and Roman coloured glass is remarkable, so much so that it is likely that the Anglo-Saxon craftworkers were re-using Roman opaque glass, possibly Roman glass tesserae, rather than Anglo-Saxon glass.

== Discovery and accession ==
The pendant was found by a labourer who was maintaining a hedge at Forsbrook in Staffordshire. A 'young lady' took it to Isaac Whitehurst of Swan Bank, Congleton, and he wrote offering it for sale, to the British Museum, who accepted, and whose receipt, dated 28 June 1879, is for £15. The museum's accession number is 'M&LA 1879.7–14.1'. The Potteries Museum & Art Gallery has a replica, commissioned in 1977, accession number K36.1977.

Three similar pendants, with a gold coin solidus mounted in a garnet cloisonné setting, are held by the British Museum: a similar 7th-century pendant using an imitation of a gold solidus of the Byzantine emperor Maurice (582-602) found near Bacton, Norfolk in 1845 (BM (P&E) 1846.6-20,1), the Wilton Cross from Hockwold cum Wilton with a coin of the Byzantine emperors Heraclius Constantine (613-630), and one with a coin of Valens (364-378). George Speake in 1970 suggested that the image of the emperor displayed on the obverse of the coin could be an object of veneration, and the setting could be a zoomorphic imitation of a Roman laurel wreath.
