= Macnaghten =

Macnaghten may refer to:

- Anne Macnaghten (1908–2000), British violinist
- Clan Macnaghten
- Daniel M'Naghten, namesake of the M'Naghten rules
- Edward Macnaghten
- Elliot Macnaghten
- Sir Francis Workman Macnaghten, 1st Baronet (1763–1843), judge in India, father of Elliot Macnaghten and William Hay Macnaghten
- Half Hung MacNaghten
- Macnaghten baronets of Bushmills House (1836)
- Malcolm Macnaghten
- Melville Macnaghten
- William Hay Macnaghten (1793–1841), British diplomat killed in the First Anglo-Afghan War

== See also ==
- Macnaughtan
- McNaughton
