= Bishop of Repton =

Anglican Derby diocese suffragan bishop title

The Bishop of Repton is an episcopal title used by a suffragan bishop of the Church of England Diocese of Derby, in the Province of Canterbury, England. The title takes its name after Repton, a large village in Derbyshire; the See was erected under the Suffragans Nomination Act 1888 by Order in Council dated 18 May 1965.

== List of bishops ==
Bishops of Repton
From	Until	Incumbent	Notes
1965	1977	Warren Hunt	
1977	1985	Stephen Verney	
1985	1999	Henry Richmond	
1999	2007	David Hawtin	
2007	2015	Humphrey Southern	became Principal of Ripon College Cuddesdon from 1 April 2015
2016	2020	Jan McFarlane	Consecrated 29 June 2016; became a Canon Residentiary of Lichfield Cathedral and honorary assistant bishop of Lichfield on 3 April 2020.
2021	2026	Malcolm Macnaughton	Consecrated 14 April 2021.
2026	present	Vacant	
