= Jan McFarlane =

British bishop and former speech and language therapist

The Right Reverend Jan McFarlane
- Dean of Lichfield
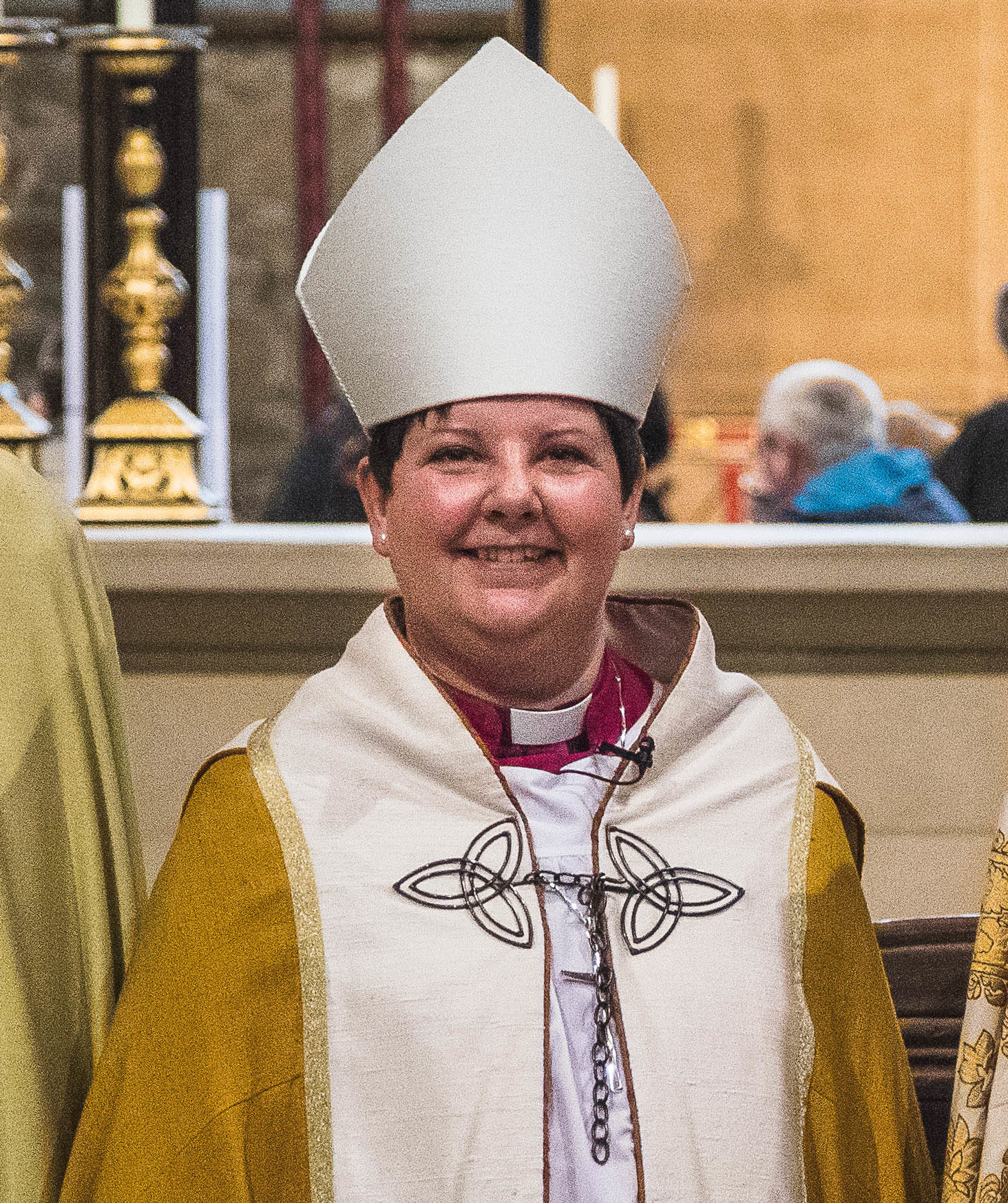
- McFarlane in March 2018
- Diocese: Diocese of Lichfield
- In office: 21 September 2024 – present
- Other post: Honorary assistant bishop (2020–present)
- Previous posts: Canon of Lichfield (2020–2024); Acting Bishop of Derby (2018–2019); Bishop of Repton (2016–2020); Archdeacon of Norwich (15 March 2009 – 2016); Diocesan Director of Communications (Diocese of Norwich; 1999–2016)

Orders
- Ordination: 1993 (deacon); 1994 (priest) by Keith Sutton
- Consecration: 29 June 2016 by Justin Welby

Personal details
- Born: Janet Elizabeth McFarlane; 25 November 1964 (age 61) Stoke-on-Trent, Staffordshire, England
- Denomination: Anglican
- Parents: David and Anne McFarlane
- Spouse: Andrew Ridoutt (m. 2004)
- Education: Blythe Bridge High School
- Alma mater: University of Sheffield; University of Durham; Cranmer Hall, Durham

Janet Elizabeth "Jan" McFarlane (born 25 November 1964) is a British Church of England bishop and former speech and language therapist. She has been Dean of Lichfield, the primus inter pares (first among equals) of the clergy at Lichfield Cathedral — the mother church of the Diocese of Lichfield — since 2024; she has also been an honorary assistant bishop of the Diocese since 2020. She has previously served as a Canon of Lichfield; as Bishop of Repton (the suffragan bishop of the Diocese of Derby); and as Acting Bishop of Derby.

== Early life and education ==
Jan McFarlane was born on 25 November 1964 in Stoke-on-Trent, Staffordshire, England. She was educated at Blythe Bridge High School, a state secondary school in Blythe Bridge near Stoke-on-Trent. She studied at the University of Sheffield, graduating with a Bachelor of Medical Science (BMedSci) degree in 1987. She then worked as a Speech Therapist in the National Health Service and lived in north Staffordshire. She specialised in teaching deaf children to speak.

Having been selected for ordination, Jan McFarlane underwent a number of years of formation. She studied theology at St John's College, Durham, and graduated from the University of Durham with a Bachelor of Arts (BA) degree in 1992. She then underwent a further year of training at Cranmer Hall, Durham, an open evangelical Anglican theological college, completing a Diploma in Ministry (DipMin) in 1993.

== Ordained ministry ==
McFarlane was ordained in the Church of England as a deacon in 1993 at Lichfield Cathedral. From 1993 to 1994, she served as parish deacon in the Stafford Team Ministry in the Diocese of Lichfield. She was ordained as a priest in 1994. She was one of the first female priests as 1994 was the first year that the Church of England ordained women to the priesthood. From 1994 to 1996, she remained in the Stafford to serve her curacy as part of the Stafford Team Ministry. From 1996 to 1999, she was a chaplain and minor canon of Ely Cathedral in the Diocese of Ely.

In 1999, she moved to the Diocese of Norwich to take up the appointment of Diocesan Director of Communications. From 2001 to 2009, she was additionally chaplain to Graham James, Bishop of Norwich. She was selected as the next Archdeacon of Norwich in 2008. On 15 March 2009, she was installed as Archdeacon in Norwich Cathedral. Upon her appointment, she became one of only nine female archdeacons out of a total of 112 in the Church of England and the first in her diocese. From 2015, she also served as Warden of Readers for the diocese.

Jan McFarlane was first elected to the General Synod of the Church of England in 2005. She is a supporter of the ordination of women as bishops. She was a member of the General Synod that approved the consecration of women to the episcopate.

=== Episcopal ministry ===
On 26 February 2016, Jan McFarlane was announced as the next Bishop of Repton, suffragan bishop in the Diocese of Derby. She was consecrated a bishop by Justin Welby, Archbishop of Canterbury, on 29 June 2016. She was welcomed into the Diocese of Derby as Bishop of Repton on 7 September 2016, during a service at Derby Cathedral. While at Repton, she also served as Acting diocesan Bishop of Derby, 31 August 2018 to February 2019.

It was announced in January 2020 that she would be moving to become a Residentiary Canon ("Canon Custos") of Lichfield Cathedral, and an honorary assistant bishop of the Diocese of Lichfield, the following April. She was duly licensed to those roles on 3 April 2020. In April 2023, she was licensed as interim dean of Lichfield Cathedral. On 5 June 2024, it was announced that she had been appointed Dean of Lichfield on a permanent basis. She was instituted as dean during a service at Lichfield Cathedral on 21 September 2024.

== Personal life ==
In 2004, McFarlane married Andrew Ridoutt. Her husband works as a television cameraman.

In February 2014, McFarlane was diagnosed with breast cancer. As part of her treatment, she underwent surgery, chemotherapy and radiotherapy. She shared her story with a local newspaper, the Eastern Daily Press, and "urged other cancer patients to not hide away from the disease".

== Selected works ==
- McFarlane, Jan (2009). Pocket prayers for Advent and Christmas. London: Church House Publishing. ISBN 9780715141960.
- McFarlane, Jan; Gooder, Paula; Baines, Nick; Kiddle, John; Cottrell, Stephen (2010). Ready Steady Slow: an Advent calendar to unwind with. London: Church House Publishing. ISBN 9780715142219.
- McFarlane, Jan (2012). Pocket prayers of blessing. London: Church House Publishing. ISBN 9780715142394.
