= Macnaughtan =

Macnaughtan is a Scottish surname. Notable people with the surname include:

- Alan MacNaughtan (1920–2002), Scottish actor
- Andrew MacNaughtan (1964–2012), Canadian photographer and music video director
- Sarah Broom Macnaughtan (1864–1916), Scottish-born novelist

== See also ==
- Macnaghten (disambiguation)
- McNaughton, a surname
