= Blythe Bridge High School =

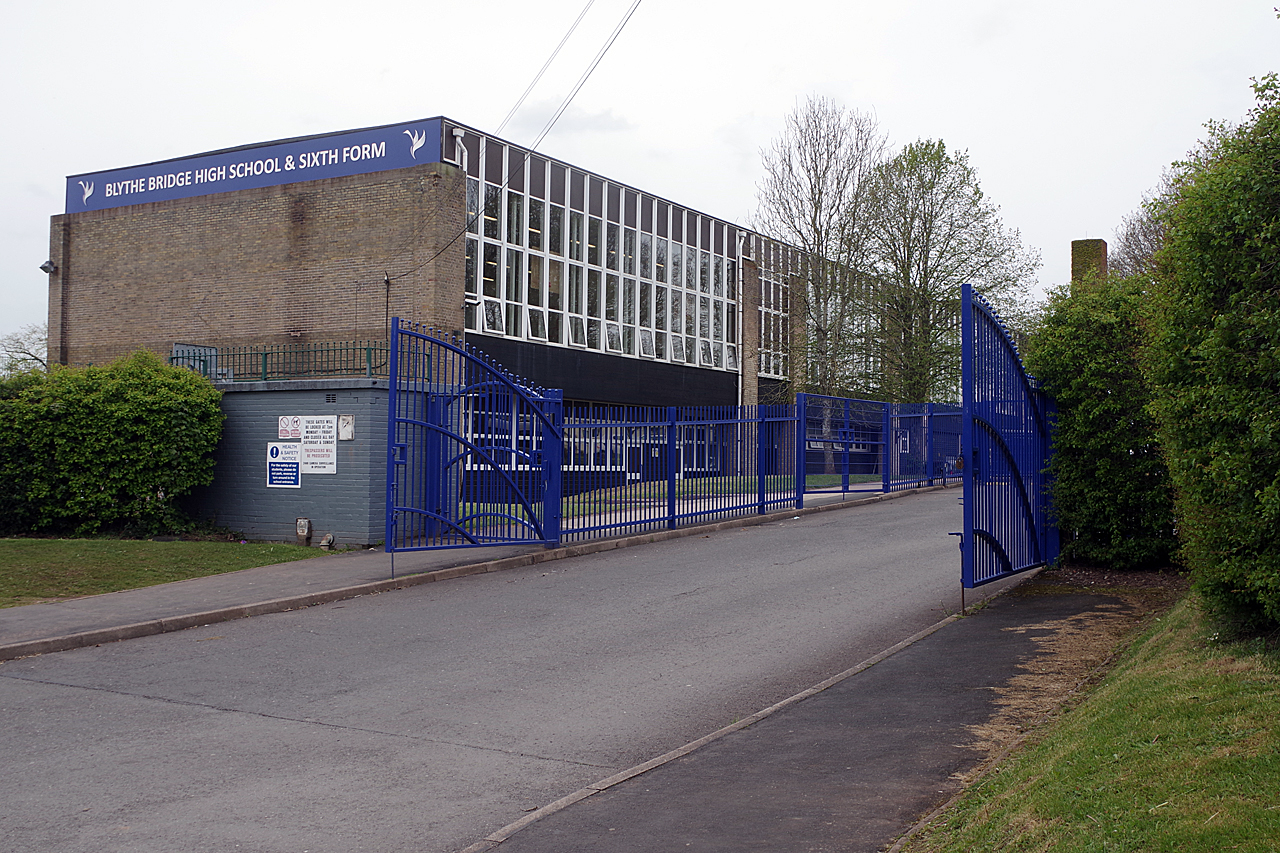

Location
- Cheadle Road; Blythe Bridge; Staffordshire, ST11 9PW; England
- Coordinates: 52.9682°N 2.0612°W

Information
- Type: Academy
- Local authority: Staffordshire
- Trust: John Taylor Multi-Academy Trust
- Department for Education URN: 149376 Tables
- Ofsted: Reports
- Headteacher: Rachael Johnson
- Gender: Coeducational
- Age: 11 to 18
- Enrolment: 1,008 as of January 2023
- Website: http://www.bb-hs.co.uk/

Blythe Bridge High School is a coeducational secondary school and sixth form located in Blythe Bridge in the English county of Staffordshire.

Previously a foundation school administered by Staffordshire County Council, in March 2023 Blythe Bridge High School converted to academy status. The school is now sponsored by the John Taylor Multi-Academy Trust.

Blythe Bridge mainly admits pupils from Dilhorne Endowed CE Primary School, Forsbrook Primary School, Fulford Primary School, Meir Heath Primary School, Springcroft Primary School, St Peter's Primary School and William Amory Primary School. The school also attracts pupils from Stoke-on-Trent.

Blythe Bridge High School offers GCSEs and vocational courses as programmes of study for pupils, while students in the sixth form have the option to study from a range of A-levels and further vocational courses.

== Notable former pupils ==
- Jan McFarlane, Church of England bishop
- Ben Brereton, professional footballer
- Ollie Shenton, professional footballer
- Ashley Wallbridge, international DJ/producer
