= Forsbrook =

- Village
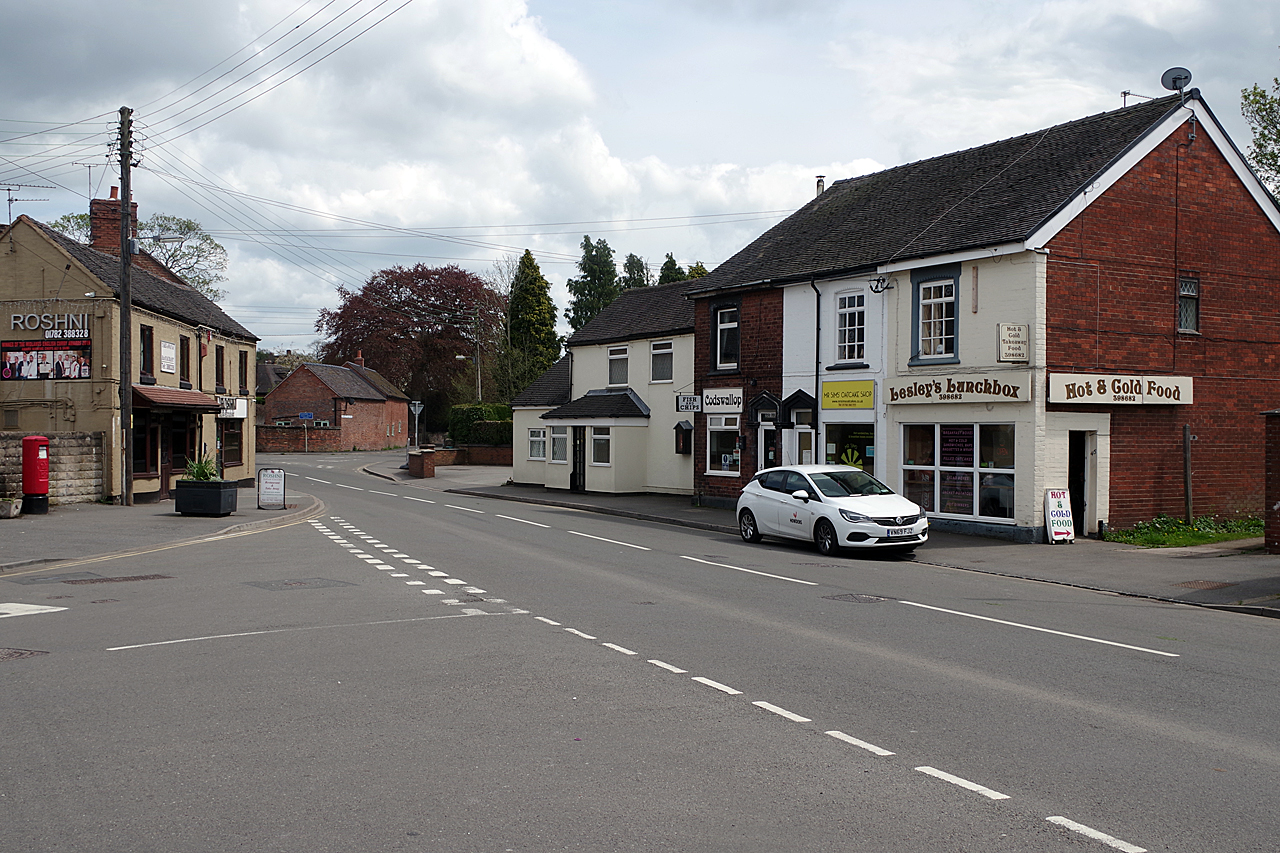
- Cheadle Road, Forsbrook
- Interactive map of Forsbrook
- Coordinates: 52.97084°N 2.05505°W
- Country: England
- County: Staffordshire

Population (2011)
  - Total: 5,095

Forsbrook is a village in Staffordshire, around three miles southwest of Cheadle and situated on the edge of the Staffordshire Moorlands.

It is an old village and is mentioned in the Domesday Book, with the rather unflattering description as waste ground.

The village derives its name from the Old English Fotes-broc - a brook or ditch. . The brook flowed through the village square, where it was crossed by a wooden pedestrian bridge and a ford for horses and vehicles, until it was culverted in 1932.

== History ==
For hundreds of years the village was only a small settlement, situated on the turnpike road to Cheadle. However, it gradually grew in size with the coming of the North Staffordshire Railway to nearby Blythe Bridge in 1848. Forsbrook, along with Blythe Marsh and Blythe Bridge all grew in size together as they were all situated along the old Roman Road (now A50) and mostly contained farmhouses. In the 18th century, Roman Road became a Turnpike road with two coaching Inns opened up alongside the road. The turnpike was the main road which connected North West England and along another road in town (Uttoxeter Road) more commercial areas were opened up.

The village changed in character during the post Second World War period as a large new housing estate was built, and the area gradually became an overspill of the Stoke-on-Trent conurbation. However, the village has still retained its rural identity and is surrounded by countryside.

Within the village there are shops and two public houses, the Roebuck and Butchers Arms. Once there were four pubs; the other two were The Miner's Arms (now a private residence), and the Bull's Head (demolished for road widening).

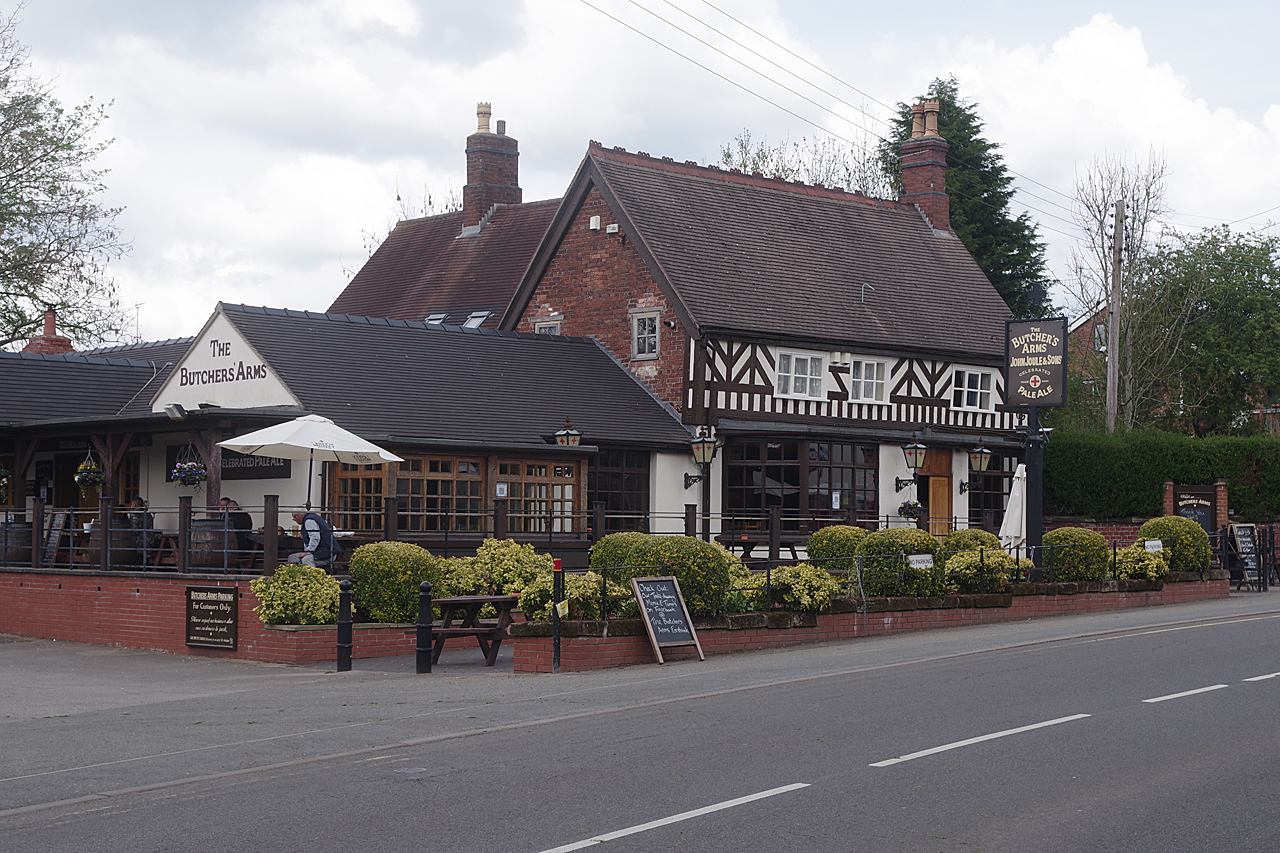
The Butcher's Arms

The village is also home to a Primitive Methodist Chapel built in 1856.

The now defunct Forsbrook Wakes were historically held in the first week of November. The traditional Forsbrook Wakes held on the Manor ground (now Blythe Bridge High School) and were abandoned following the start of the Great War as celebrating was deemed inappropriate. Several other local Wakes also met their demise at this time. The demolition of the Manor House, a materials shortage, lack of spare fire-wood and absence of able bodied men contributed to its suspension. The commencement of the Forsbrook Wakes were marked by the lighting of the beacon and with a candle taken and offered by Saint Peter's Church. The Wakes were well attended by most locals and with a Bonfire lit from the beacon to allow late night prayer and revelry. Beeches Funfair was regular attraction and are now sadly untraceable. The ground immediately behind the Butchers Arms pub was the location of the winter quarters of Beech's Fair.

The Forsbrook Firework Spectacular was seen by many as the revival in part of the ancient Forsbrook Wakes. The two events are held on the same plot of land, the same week and with the presence of the funfair, stalls and celebrations. Although this community event and tourist attraction is held to celebrate Guy Fawkes Night, obvious comparisons are being made. Attendance to the event in 2013 exceeded 1500 people and marked the largest public gathering in the village in living memory. The event is hosted by Forsbrook Primary School and several charities. No beacon to date has been lit since 1914.

The Forsbrook Pendant, an item of Anglo-Saxon jewellery comprising a 7th-century ring enclosing a Roman gold coin, was found in Forsbrook by a labourer and sold to the British Museum in 1879.

Forsbrook is contiguous with Blythe Bridge, with which it shares a parish council, and Blythe Marsh. It was formerly in the parish of All Saints Dilhorne.

During the First and Second World War 65 men from Forsbrook and Blythe Bridge laid down their lives for their country. The names are currently being updated and will be recorded on the village Calvary Cross in time for the centenary 2014 Commemorations. The Cross was erected in 1921 and lies in the grounds of St Peter's Church.

== Notable people ==
- Arthur Bridgett (1882–1954), Sunderland and England footballer, played 341 games
- John Coldham (1901–1986), schoolmaster at Sedbergh School and cricketer.
- Doug Lishman (1923–1994), Arsenal and Nottingham Forest footballer, settled in Forsbrook, played 326 games
- Levison Wood (born 1982), grew up locally, British army officer and explorer; Chancellor of Staffordshire University since 2024

== See also ==
- Listed buildings in Forsbrook
