= Listed buildings in Forsbrook =

Forsbrook is a civil parish in the district of Staffordshire Moorlands, Staffordshire, England. It contains five listed buildings that are recorded in the National Heritage List for England. All the listed buildings are designated at Grade II, the lowest of the three grades, which is applied to "buildings of national importance and special interest". The parish contains the village of Forsbrook and the surrounding area. The listed buildings consist of four farmhouses and a private house.

== Buildings ==
| Name and location | Photograph | Date | Notes |
|---|---|---|---|
| Cashheath Farmhouse; 52.97731°N 2.06030°W | — | 17th century | A sandstone farmhouse on a chamfered plinth with a moulded string course, and a tile roof that has verge parapets with pitched copings on corbelled kneelers. There are two storeys and an attic, four bays, and a later lean-to. The windows have chamfered mullions, above one is a gablet, and the entrance is on the left side. |
| Stonehouse Cottage; 52.96403°N 2.05103°W | — | 1670 | The house was remodelled and extended in 1891. The original part is in sandstone, the extension to the right is in brick, and the roof is tiled. There are two storeys, each part has two bays, the extension being slightly lower and narrower. The original part has a moulded string course, and the windows are casements. On the front is a gabled porch, and the doorway has a dated and initialled Tudor arched lintel. In the left gable end are chamfered mullioned windows, and the extension contains casement windows with segmental heads. |
| Forsbrook Hall Farmhouse; 52.97021°N 2.05165°W | — | 1672 | The farmhouse is in stone with a moulded string course and a tile roof. There are two storeys and an attic, and four bays. On the front is a two-storey gabled porch containing a doorway with a dated and initialled Tudor arched lintel. The windows are casements with chamfered surrounds, and in the right gable end is an attic window with mullions. |
| Callowhill Farmhouse; 52.98194°N 2.03914°W | — | 18th century | The farmhouse is in red brick, and has a tile roof with verge parapets. There are two storeys and an attic, and four bays. On the front is a projecting gabled porch with two storeys and an attic containing a segmental-headed entrance. The windows are cross-casements with segmental heads, some of which are blocked. |
| Field Farmhouse; 52.97913°N 2.05029°W | — | Late 18th century | A red brick farmhouse with a tile roof, two storeys and an attic, and three bays. In the centre is a doorway, and the windows are casements with segmental heads. |
