= Ringlemere barrow =

Archaeological site in England

Coordinates: 51.263149°N 1.291066°E

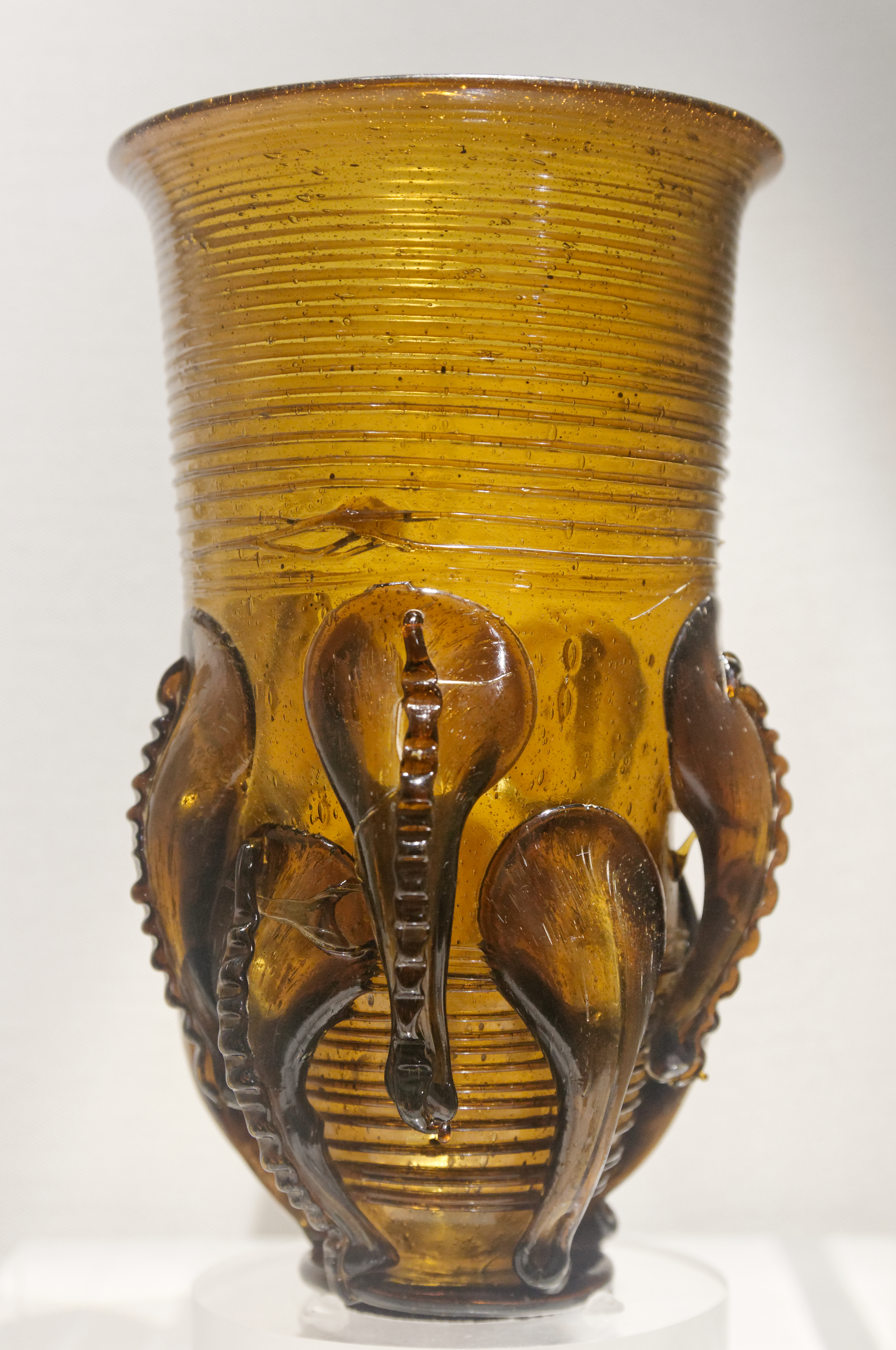
Claw beaker from the Ringlemere barrow.

The Ringlemere barrow is an archaeological site near Sandwich in the English county of Kent most famous as being the find site of the Ringlemere gold cup.

Because the metal detectorist reported finding the gold cup, professional archaeologists from Canterbury Archaeological Trust were able to properly excavate the site. This work has revealed a previously unsuspected funerary complex of Early Bronze Age date (approximately 2300 BC) had stood at the site. It is thought that the cup was not a grave good, as it was found independent of any burial and away from the centre of the mound as part of the mound material context. It has been suggested by Canterbury Archaeological Trust, that the cup may have been a votive offering placed within the mound during its construction. However, the mound had suffered extensive disturbance due to the actions of burrowing animals and the cup may have been moved from its original position. No contemporary burials have been found at the site although later Iron Age ones have since been found along with a Saxon cemetery.

Excavation work has continued at the site, funded by English Heritage, the BBC, the British Museum and the Kent Archaeological Society. This work has indicated that the now ploughed-away barrow was as high as 5m and had a diameter of more than 40m. The flat-bottomed ditch that surrounded it was 5–6 m wide and 1.35 m deep. Considerable evidence of much earlier Neolithic activity has now been found on the site including by far the largest assemblage of grooved ware in the county. Current theories now focus on the site having been significant long before and after the barrow being built and that the ditch may have been that of an older henge or, more likely, hengiform monument.
