= John Coldham =

English cricketer and schoolmaster

Personal information
- Full name: John Maurice Coldham
- Born: 17 January 1901; Forsbrook, Staffordshire, England
- Died: 25 July 1986 (aged 85); Woking, Surrey, England
- Batting: Right-handed

Domestic team information
- Years: Team
- 1925: Oxford University
- 1924: Minor Counties
- 1924–1932: Norfolk

Career statistics
Competition	First-class
Matches	2
Runs scored	73
Batting average	18.25
100s/50s	–/–
Top score	40
Balls bowled	–
Wickets	–
Bowling average	–
5 wickets in innings	–
10 wickets in match	–
Best bowling	–
Catches/stumpings	–/–
- Source: Cricinfo, 23 May 2012

John Maurice Coldham (17 January 1901 – 25 July 1986) was an English schoolmaster and cricketer. Coldham was a right-handed batsman. The son of Henry Roe Coldham and his wife Katherine Maynard Coldham, he was born at Forsbrook, Staffordshire, and was educated at St Ronan's School and Repton School.

Coldham made his debut in county cricket for Norfolk against the Surrey Second XI in the 1924 Minor Counties Championship, appearing eight times for the county in that season. In that same season he was selected to represent a combined Minor Counties team in a first-class match against the touring South Africans at the County Ground, Lakenham. Batting first, the Minor Counties made 196 all out, with Coldham making 40 runs in the innings, before he was dismissed by Sid Pegler. The South Africans then made 149 all out in their first-innings, to which the Minor Counties then responded to in their second-innings with 272 all out, with Claude Carter dismissing him for 20 runs. The South Africans were then dismissed for 294 in their second-innings, giving the Minor Counties a famous victory by 25 runs over their Test playing opponents.

The following season, while studying at The Queen's College, Oxford, Coldham made a single first-class appearance for Oxford University Cricket Club against the Army at the University Parks. Batting first, the Army were dismissed for 380 all out, with Oxford University then responding in their first-innings with 282 all out, with Coldham scoring 7 runs before he was dismissed lbw by Henry Kirkwood. In their second-innings, the Army were dismissed for 200, leaving Oxford University with a target of 299 for victory. They fell narrowly short of chasing down that target, dismissed instead for 286, with Coldham scoring 26 runs before he was dismissed by Edward Armitage. He continued to play minor counties cricket for Norfolk, making a total of 52 appearances for the county in the Minor Counties Championship, the last of which came against Buckinghamshire in 1932.

He married Elizabeth Herbert Hamilton Oldham in May 1933, with the couple having five children. He spent 21 years as a master at Sedbergh School, where he coached cricket. He died at hospital in Woking, Surrey, on 25 July 1986, following a long illness.
