= Margaret McNaughton =

Scottish Canadian author and historian

Margaret McNaughton was a Scottish Canadian author and historian. Her account of her husband's experiences travelling across Canada to the Cariboo gold fields was the second non-fiction book published by a woman in British Columbia.

Born Margaret Peebles in 1856 to Thomas Peebles and his wife Jane Mackenzie Murie in Balmaghie Kirkcudbrightshire, Scotland, she came to British Columbia in 1888, and married Montreal-born Archibald McNaughton in New Westminster in 1890. The McNaughtons lived in Quesnel, where Archibald worked as a postmaster and Hudson's Bay Company official. Their only child died in childhood. She remarried on June 27, 1905, to William Francis Manson. She died in 1915 whilst on a visit to Los Angeles, California.

== Writing career ==
McNaughton wrote the account of the 150-person, five-month expedition in 1896, covering Archibald's 1864 journey from Fort Garry, Manitoba, across the Rocky Mountains and into the Cariboo goldfields. By this time Archibald was paralyzed and under Margaret's full-time care. Titled Overland to the Cariboo: An Eventful Journey of Canadian Pioneers to the Gold-Fields of British Columbia in 1862, it was published by Toronto-based William Briggs. The book was reprinted in 1973 by J.J. Douglas, Ltd. (now Douglas & McIntyre). McNaughton also wrote regularly for regional newspapers and historical societies and served for various women's groups and writers associations.

== Books ==
- Overland to the Cariboo (Toronto: William Briggs, 1896)

== See also ==
- Mount McNaughton (Canada)
