= Malcolm Macnaughton (bishop) =

British Anglican bishop

The Right Reverend Malcolm Macnaughton
- Bishop of Repton
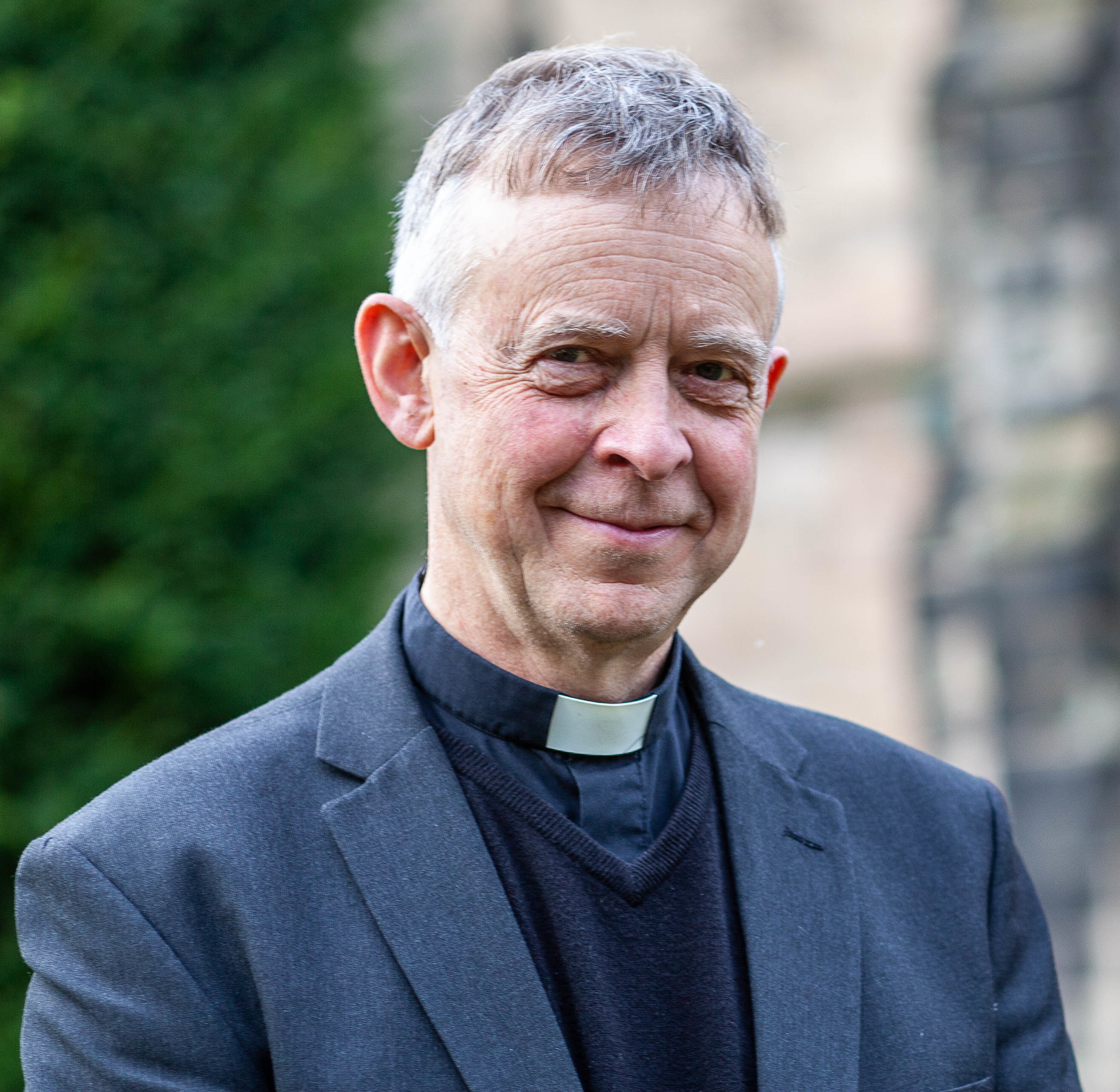
- Macnaughton in 2020
- Church: Church of England
- Diocese: Diocese of Derby
- In office: 2021 to 2026
- Predecessor: Jan McFarlane
- Successor: TBA

Orders
- Ordination: 1981 (deacon); 1982 (priest)
- Consecration: 14 April 2021 by Sarah Mullally

Personal details
- Born: William Malcolm Macnaughton; 1957 (age 68–69)
- Denomination: Anglicanism

William Malcolm Macnaughton (born 1957) is a British Anglican bishop. From 2021 to 2026, he was Bishop of Repton, the suffragan bishop of the Church of England's Diocese of Derby.

== Ordained ministry ==
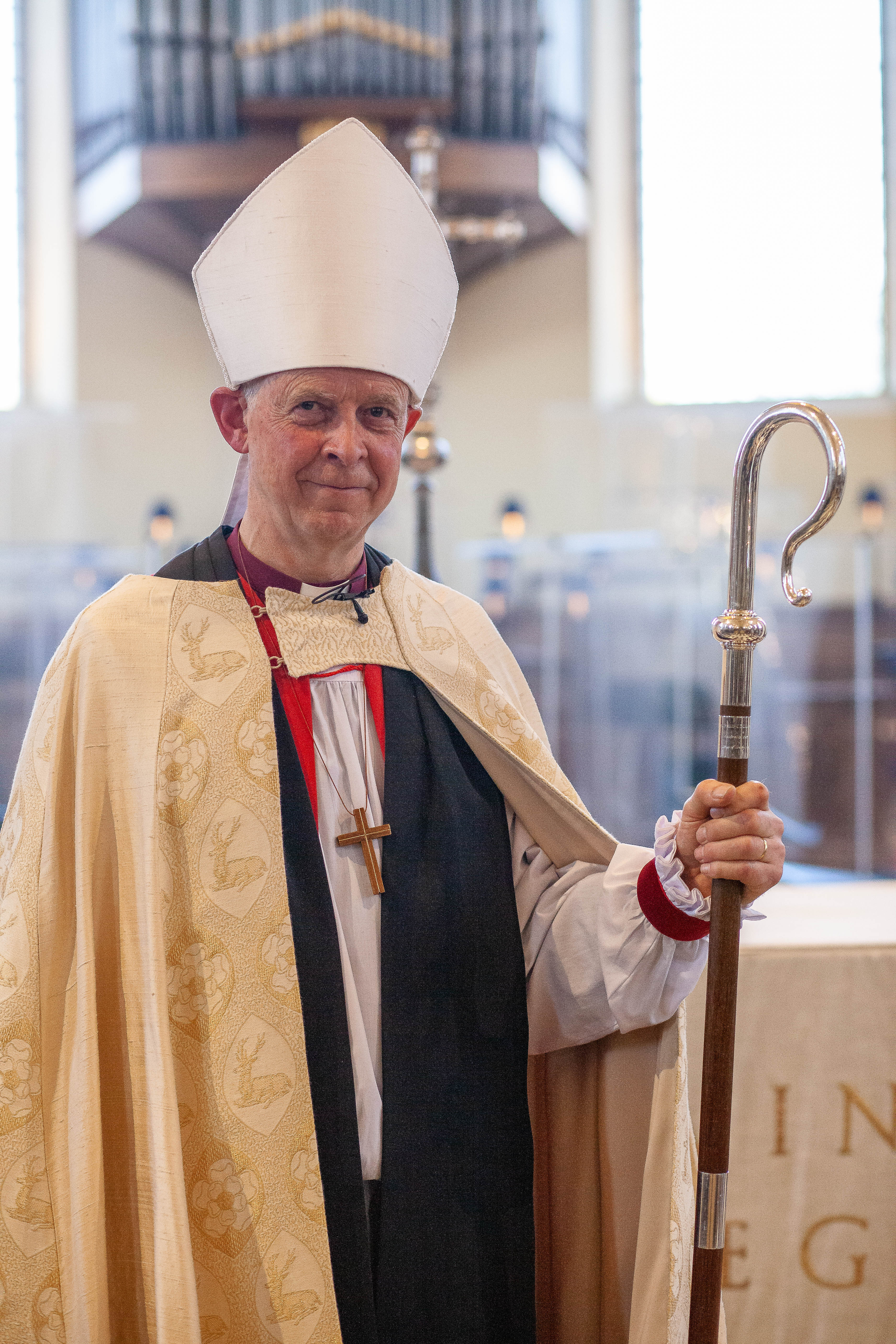
Macnaughton, Bishop of Repton

Macnaughton was ordained in the Church of England as a deacon in 1981 and as a priest in 1982. He served his curacy at St Andrew's Church, Haughton-le-Skerne in the Diocese of Durham from 1981 to 1985. He then spent five years as priest-in-charge of All Saints Church, Newton Hall in the same diocese: this church is an Anglican-Methodist local ecumenical partnership. In 1990, he moved to the Diocese of London, where he became team vicar of St. Leonard's, Shoreditch and St. John the Baptist, Hoxton. He was additionally area dean of Hackney from 1994 to 1999. After a parish reorganisation, he was vicar of St. John the Baptist, Hoxton from 2000 to 2002.

In 2002, Macnaughton moved to the Diocese of Oxford to become Team Rector of the Hambleden Valley Group, a multi-church benefice. He additionally became area dean of Wycombe in 2005. Then, from 2007 until his appointment as a bishop, he served as Chief of Staff to the Archbishop of York: first to John Sentamu then to Stephen Cottrell. He was made a canon and prebendary of York Minster in 2016.

=== Episcopal ministry ===
In October 2020, it was announced that Macnaughton would be the next Bishop of Repton, a suffragan bishop in the Diocese of Derby. He was scheduled to legally take the See of Repton, and be consecrated a bishop the Archbishop of Canterbury, Justin Welby, on 28 January 2021: however, this was postponed due to the ongoing COVID-19 pandemic. He was instead consecrated a bishop on 14 April 2021, by Sarah Mullally, Bishop of London, during a service at Lambeth Palace. He retired on 30 April 2026.
