= James McNaughton =

James McNaughton may refer to:

- James McNaughton (bobsleigh) (born 1987), Canadian Olympic bobsledder
- James McNaughton (Ruairí Óg Cushendall hurler) (c. 1963–2014), Irish hurler
- James McNaughton (Loughgiel Shamrocks hurler) (born 1997), Irish hurler
- James McNaughton (politician), former member of the Legislative Assembly of Alberta from Alberta, Canada

== See also ==
- James MacNaughton, president of the Calumet and Hecla Mining Company
