= Mount McNaughton (Canada) =

Mountain in British Columbia, Canada

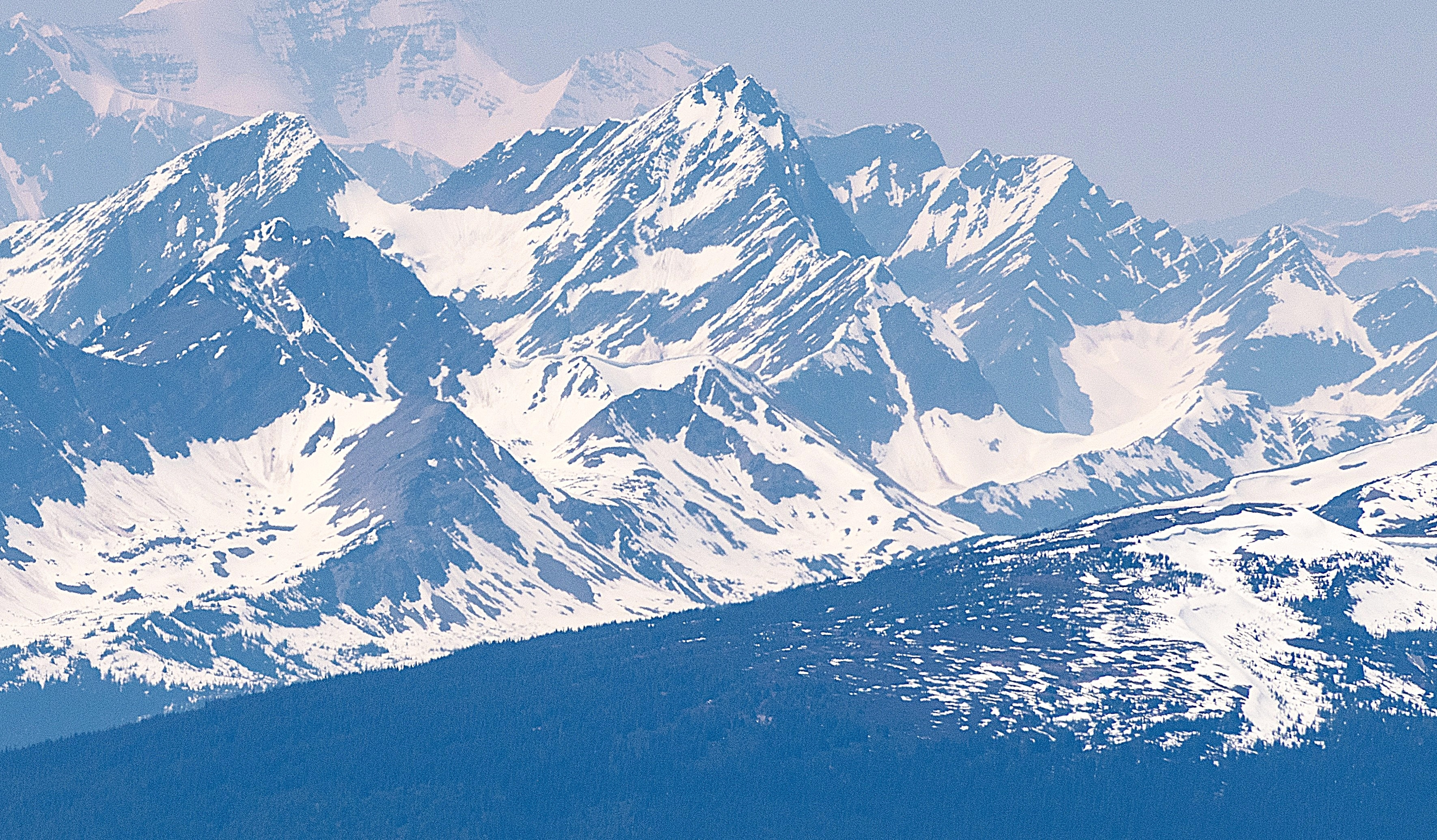
- Southeast aspect, seen from The Whistlers

Highest point
- Elevation: 2,905 m (9,531 ft)
- Prominence: 973 m (3,192 ft)
- Parent peak: Mount Robson (3,954 m)
- Isolation: 15.1 km (9.4 mi)
- Listing: Mountains of British Columbia
- Coordinates: 53°00′26″N 118°45′08″W

Naming
- Etymology: Margaret McNaughton

Geography
- Location within British Columbia Location within Canada
- Interactive map of Mount McNaughton
- Country: Canada
- Province: British Columbia
- District: Cariboo Land District
- Protected area: Mount Robson Provincial Park
- Parent range: Canadian Rockies
- Topo map: NTS 83E2 Resplendent Creek

Mount McNaughton is a mountain in the Canadian Rockies of British Columbia, Canada.

== Description ==
Mount McNaughton is a 2,905-metre (9,531-foot) summit located 29 kilometres (18 mi) southeast of Mount Robson and 5 km (3.1 mi) west of the Continental Divide in Mount Robson Provincial Park. Precipitation runoff from the peak drains to the nearby Fraser River via McNaughton Creek, Moose River, and Grant Brook. Topographic relief is significant as the summit rises 1,200 m (3,937 ft) above McNaughton Creek in two km (1.2 mi). The nearest higher summit is Derr Peak, 15 km (9.3 mi) to the east.

== Geology ==
The mountain is composed of sedimentary rock laid down during the Precambrian to Jurassic periods and pushed east and over the top of younger rock during the Laramide orogeny. The mountain is the type locality of the McNaughton Formation which is a thick sequence of bedded quartzose sandstone or quartzite deposited during the Cambrian period.

== Etymology ==
The mountain's toponym was applied by interprovincial boundary surveyors and officially adopted on 4 December 1923 by the Geographical Names Board of Canada to honor Margaret McNaughton (1856–1915), author of "Overland to Cariboo", an account of an 1862 overland journey by 150 pioneers and goldseekers to the Cariboo goldfields. She was married to Archibald McNaughton, one of the "Overlanders."

== Climate ==
Based on the Köppen climate classification, Mount McNaughton is located in a subarctic climate zone with cold, snowy winters, and mild summers. Winter temperatures can drop below −20 °C with wind chill factors below −30 °C.

== See also ==
- Geography of British Columbia
