= Blythe Bridge =

Village in Staffordshire, England

Coordinates: 52.9704°N 2.0709°W

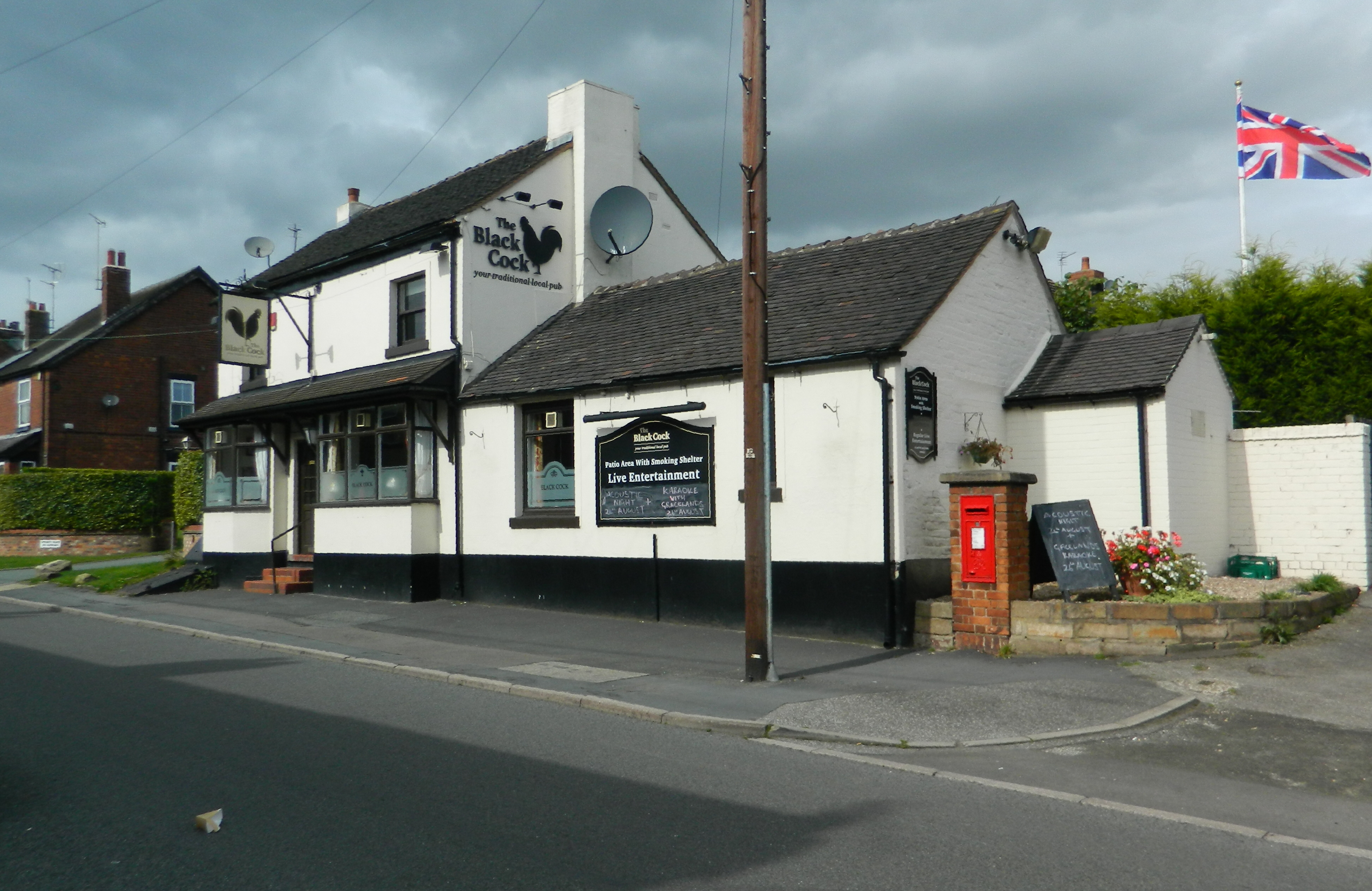
- The Black Cock, Blythe Bridge

- Location within Staffordshire
- Population: 5,931 (2011)
- OS grid reference: SJ953414
- Civil parish: Forsbrook
- District: Staffordshire Moorlands
- Shire county: Staffordshire
- Region: West Midlands
- Country: England
- Sovereign state: United Kingdom
- Post town: STOKE-ON-TRENT
- Postcode district: ST11
- Dialling code: 01782
- Police: Staffordshire
- Fire: Staffordshire
- Ambulance: West Midlands
- UK Parliament: Stoke-on-Trent South

Blythe Bridge (/blaɪð brɪdʒ/) is a village in Staffordshire, England, south-east of Stoke-on-Trent.

== Etymology ==
Blythe Bridge is so called as it is built around the site of a bridge over the River Blithe (spelt differently from the name of the village itself), a small river which passes directly through the village.

== Today ==
=== Facilities ===
It has a high school and sixth form, library, as well as a public house, The Black Cock on Uttoxeter Road. The Smithfield and The White Cock were demolished due to the construction of two housing estates and The Duke of Wellington is now a Tesco Express. The village also has a bakery, mortgage shop, betting shop, newsagents, motor garage, GP surgery, a micropub, a few hairdressers and some fast-food outlets. The library is joined to Blythe Bridge High School and Blythe Bridge Youth Centre. The Duke of Wellington is now a Tesco Express after its closure as a pub in early 2013.

=== Media ===
Blythe Bridge is covered by The Blythe and Forsbrook Times, a weekly newspaper. It is produced by Times, Echo and Life Publications (established 1896), which publish the only independent family owned and run newspapers in North Staffordshire.

=== Schools ===
- Blythe Bridge High School
- Springcroft Primary School
- Forsbrook Primary School
- William Amory Primary School

== Transport ==
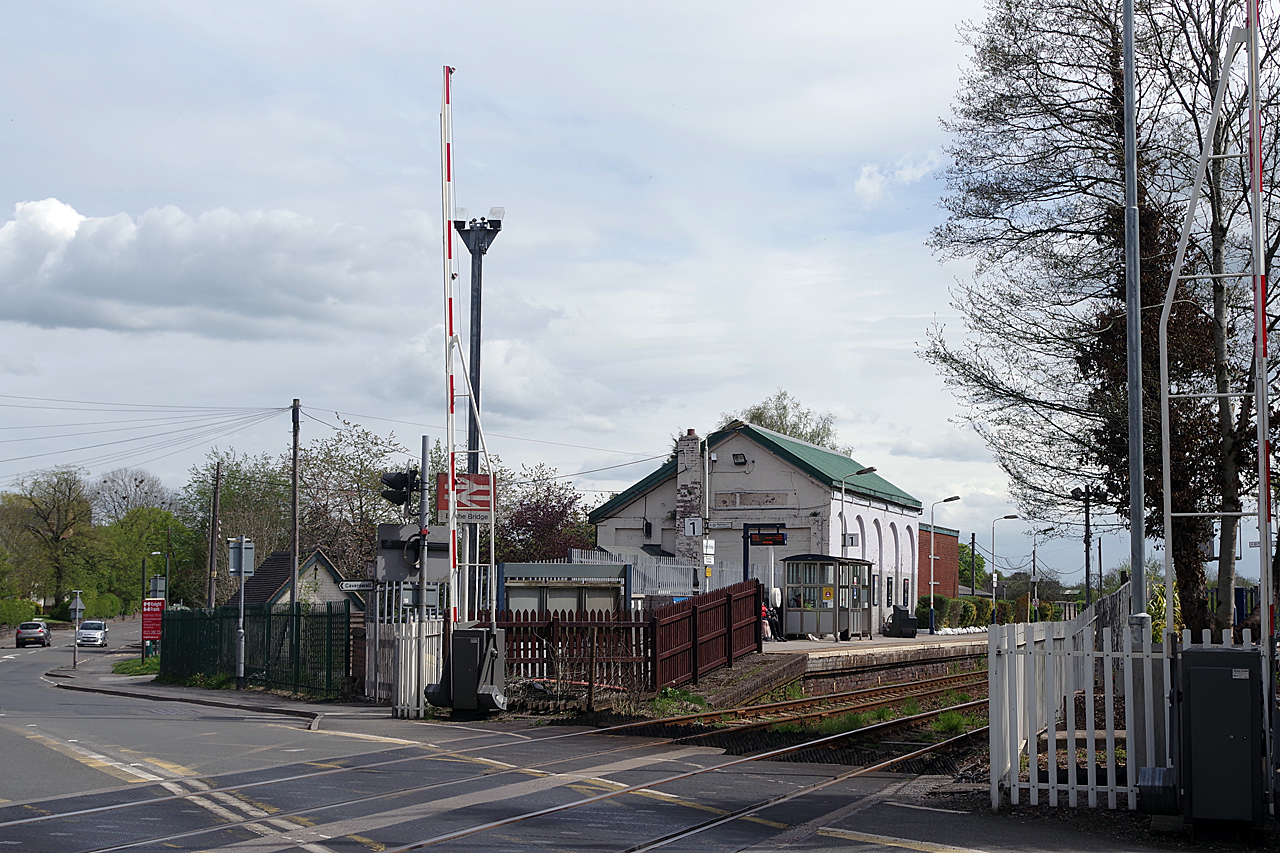
Blythe Bridge Station

=== Rail ===
Train services are available at Blythe Bridge railway station, which was opened by the North Staffordshire Railway on 7 August 1848, on the Crewe to Derby railway line. The station buildings and signal box have been demolished. The line currently runs from Crewe to Newark-on-Trent in Nottinghamshire.

A Heritage railway, Foxfield Light Railway operate north of the village, with the southern terminus, Caverswall Road, being 0.5 miles (0.80 km) north of the main line station along Blythe Bridge Road.

=== Road ===
The Uttoxeter Road, a former major motorway link route (M1 to M6) was partially relieved by the A50 dual-carriageway. The bypass road opened in 1975, and then the section to Uttoxeter in 1985.

=== Air ===
The nearby Meir Aerodrome closed in 1973 and the land was used to build the large Meir Park housing estate.

== Nearby places ==
- Barlaston
- Cheadle
- Draycott in the Moors
- Forsbrook
- Fulford
- Lightwood
- Longton
- Meir
- Uttoxeter

== Notable people ==
- Ernest Albert Egerton VC (1897 in Longton – 1966 in Blythe Bridge) recipient of the Victoria Cross buried in Blythe Bridge
- Alan Weston (1907 in Leicester – 1997 in Blythe Bridge) cricketer, right-handed batsman
- The Sutherland Brothers (active 1968–1979) a folk and rock music duo, wrote Rod Stewarts hit Sailing, may have lived there
- Rachel Shenton (born 1987) actress and screenwriter – won the Academy Award for live action short film at the 90th Academy Awards for The Silent Child
- Ollie Shenton (born 1997) footballer who played as a midfielder for Stoke City F.C.
- Ben Brereton (born 1999) went to school in Blythe Bridge, professional footballer for Villarreal
- Baylee Dipepa (born 12 January 2007) professional footballer for Port Vale F.C.
