= Malcolm Macnaughton (obstetrician) =

Scottish obstetrician and gynaecologist (1925–2016)

Sir Malcolm Campbell Macnaughton , , FRCPGlas, FRCOG, FFFP, FRSE (4 April 1925 – 1 July 2016) was a Scottish obstetrician and gynaecologist. He was an emeritus professor of obstetrics and gynaecology, and an influential voice in promoting legislation allowing for experimentation on early embryos.

Macnaughton was president of the Royal College of Obstetricians and Gynaecologists from 1984 to 1987.

In 1986, Macnaughton was knighted for his services to obstetrics and gynaecology.

Macnaughton was president of the British Fertility Society, from 1992 to 1995.
