= Diocese of Derby =

Diocese of the Church of England

Coordinates: 52.9248°N 1.4774°W

Diocese of Derby Dioecesis Derbiensis
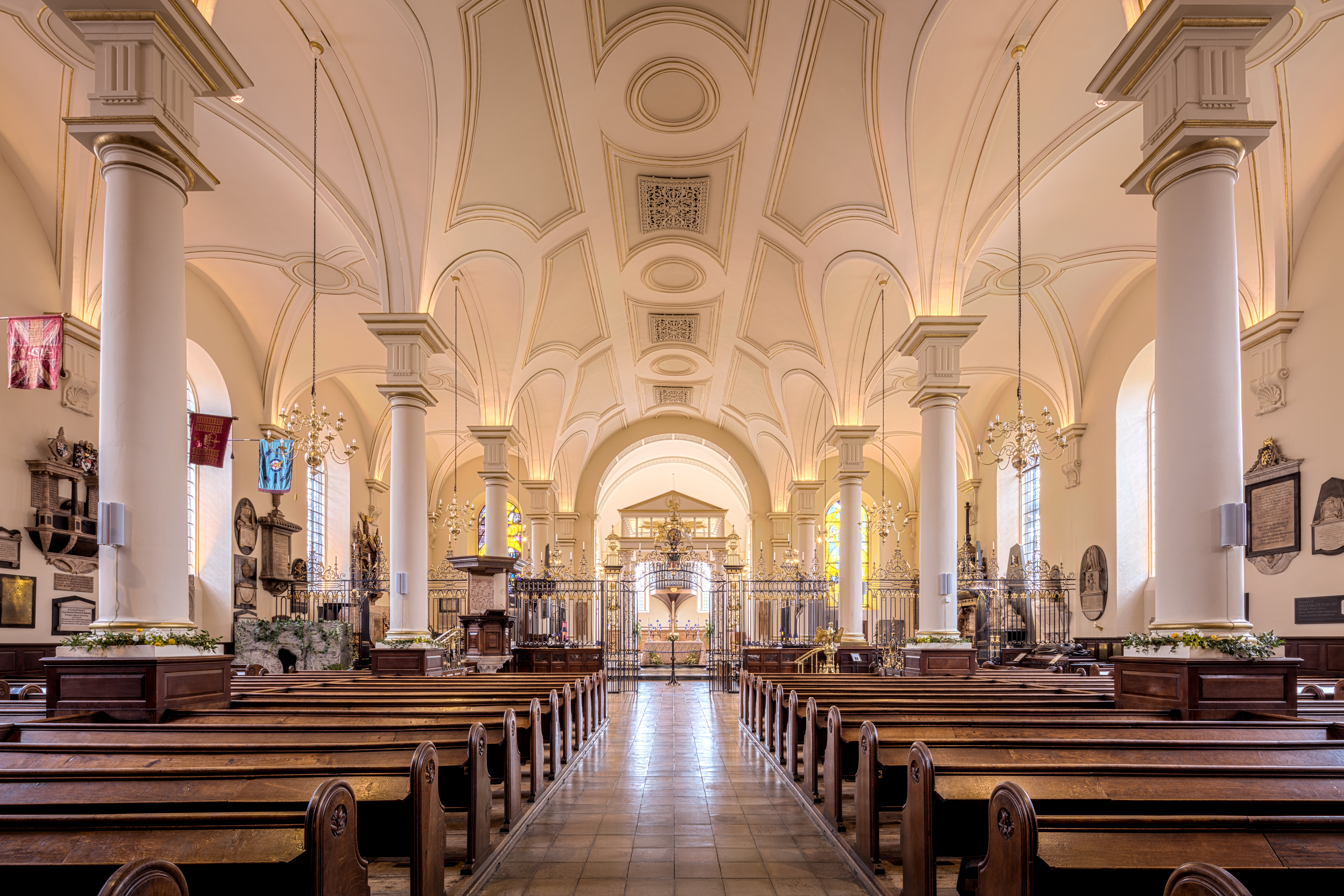
- The nave of Derby Cathedral

- Coat of arms

- Flag

Location
- Ecclesiastical province: Canterbury
- Archdeaconries: Derbyshire Peak and Dales, Derby City and South Derbyshire, East Derbyshire

Statistics
- Parishes: 255
- Churches: 332

Information
- Cathedral: Derby Cathedral

Current leadership
- Bishop: Libby Lane, Bishop of Derby
- Suffragan: Bishop of Repton (vacant)
- Archdeacons: Matthew Trick, Archdeacon of Derby City and South Derbyshire; Nicky Fenton, Archdeacon of Derbyshire Peak and Dales; Archdeacon of East Derbyshire (vacant)

Website
- derby.anglican.org

The Diocese of Derby is a Church of England diocese in the Province of Canterbury, roughly covering the same area as the County of Derbyshire. Its diocesan bishop is the Bishop of Derby whose seat (cathedra) is at Derby Cathedral. The diocesan bishop is assisted by one suffragan bishop, the Bishop of Repton.

== Bishops ==
The Bishop of Derby is Libby Lane. The diocesan Bishop is assisted by a suffragan Bishop of Repton (Malcolm Macnaughton). The provincial episcopal visitor (for traditional Anglo-Catholic parishes in this diocese who have petitioned for alternative episcopal oversight) is the Bishop suffragan of Ebbsfleet. Derby is one of the few dioceses not to license the provincial episcopal visitor as an honorary assistant bishop.

There is one former bishop licensed as honorary assistant bishops in the diocese:

- 2008–present: retired former Bishop of Sheffield Jack Nicholls lives in Chapel-en-le-Frith and is also licensed in neighbouring Diocese of Manchester.

Roger Jupp, a former Bishop of Popondetta, returned to parish ministry in England in 2005. He was vicar of St Laurence’s Church, Long Eaton, from 2012 until retiring in 2018. Jupp is not an honorary assistant bishop of the diocese.

== Archdeaconries ==
The Archdeaconry of Derby was originally part of the Diocese of Lichfield, but was moved to form part of the Diocese of Southwell when that diocese was created in 1884. On 7 July 1927 the archdeaconries of Derby and Chesterfield became the Diocese of Derby. In 2022, the archdeaconries of Derby and of Chesterfield were dissolved and three new archdeaconries erected: of Derby City and South Derbyshire, of East Derbyshire, and of Derbyshire Peak and Dales.
