= Long Wittenham =

Village in Oxfordshire, England

Coordinates: 51.637°N 1.211°W

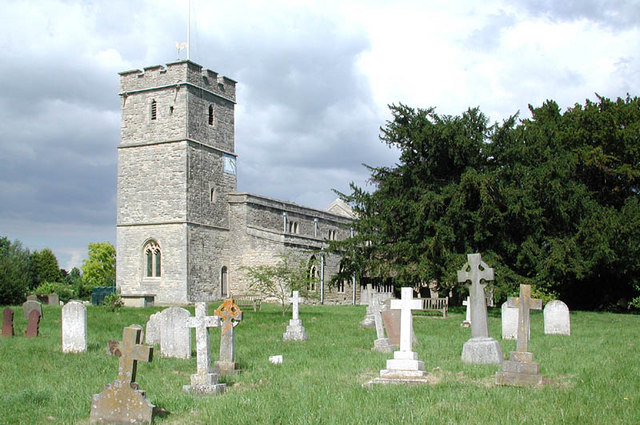
- St. Mary's parish church

- Location within Oxfordshire
- Area: 1.18 km^{2} (0.46 sq mi)
- Population: 887 (2011 census)
  - Density: 752/km^{2} (1,950/sq mi)
- OS grid reference: SU5493
- Civil parish: Long Wittenham
- District: South Oxfordshire
- Shire county: Oxfordshire
- Region: South East
- Country: England
- Sovereign state: United Kingdom
- Post town: Abingdon
- Postcode district: OX14
- Dialling code: 01865
- Police: Thames Valley
- Fire: Oxfordshire
- Ambulance: South Central
- UK Parliament: Didcot and Wantage
- Website: Longwittenham.com

Long Wittenham is a village and small civil parish about 3 miles (5 km) north of Didcot, and 3.5 miles (5.6 km) southeast of Abingdon. It was part of Berkshire until the 1974 boundary changes transferred it from Berkshire to Oxfordshire, and from the former Wallingford Rural District to the new district of South Oxfordshire.

== Geography ==
The village is on the outside of a meander in the River Thames, on slightly higher ground than the flood plain around it. The river navigation follows Clifton cut, not the meander. About 1 mile (1.6 km) to the east, across the river, is the Roman town of Dorcic – now Dorchester-on-Thames. To the south-east are neighbouring Little Wittenham which has a much smaller population but a much larger area and within this parish is Wittenham Clumps, also called the Sinodun Hills.

== History ==
The village is supposedly named after a Saxon chieftain, named Witta, but there is evidence of an earlier settlement. Bronze Age double-ditch enclosures and middle Bronze Age pottery were identified in the 1960s, and early Bronze Age items, such as an axe and spearhead, have been found in the Thames. Later settlement evidence is more extensive: Iron Age and Roman presence is indicated by trackways, various buildings (enclosures, farms and villas), burials (cremation and inhumation), and pottery and coins. There is also evidence of a possible Frankish settlement: a 5th-century grave that contained high-status Frankish objects. This early habitation was first revealed in the 1890s, in the first ever use of cropmarks to discern archaeological remains. In 2016, on land owned by the Sylva Foundation, an Anglo-Saxon building was excavated by Oxford University School of Archaeology.

The core of the village emerges from the Saxon era. 6th century cropmarks outline a large group of buildings, which indicate, if not a royal palace, then certainly a high status Saxon enclosure, and the variety and number of objects found in Saxon burial sites around the village would appear to support this. These large, Saxon burial sites also indicate a sizeable population that lasted for many years. Historians now recognise that the general area of southern Oxfordshire was the heartland of the Gewisse. The nearness to the Iron Age hillfort of Wittenham Clumps and the Roman (and post-Roman) town of Dorchester show that the localised area was of great importance for many centuries, although the notion that Witta (and/or his family) were related to the later Royal House of Wessex, is unproven.

The Domesday Book of 1086 records the village in one of two entries for Wittenham identifiable as this part of the modern village by government-registered manorial descent (such as the Feet of fines for example). By the Tudor era, parish records show it had a population of around 200, with arable crops: wheat, oats, barley and rye being farmed. For a time the village was called Earl's Wittenham, after its feudal overlord Gilbert de Clare, 7th Earl of Gloucester.

Long Wittenham Allotments Act 1809
- Act of Parliament
- Parliament of the United Kingdom
- Long title: An Act for inclosing Lands in the Manor and Parish of Long Wittenham, in the County of Berks.
- Citation: 49 Geo. 3. c. cviii

Dates
- Royal assent: 20 May 1809

Text of statute as originally enacted

In 1534 Sir Thomas White bought the manor and gave it to his foundation, St John's College, Oxford. Until recently, the President and scholars of St. John's owned most of the houses in the village and much of the land. Until the inclosure acts there were just two large, open fields, which the college leased in strips to the various villagers. In 1857, using a special government grant for agricultural communities, the village school was built. Local legend claims that Oliver Cromwell addressed the villagers on his way to his niece's wedding, in neighbouring Little Wittenham. The author and wood engraver Robert Gibbings lived at Footbridge Cottage at the end of his life (1955–8), and is buried in the churchyard. His last book, Till I end my Song (1957), is based on his life in the village.

In the late 1930s (exact date unknown) the University of Oxford based its Institute for Research in Agricultural Engineering at College Farm (owned by St John's College, Oxford), which moved to York in 1942. The property was subsequently managed as a commercial farm although some buildings gradually fell into dereliction. In 1992 a large proportion of the farmland, which had been sold the year before, was donated to the Northmoor Trust (now Earth Trust) to establish a new research woodland called Paradise Wood, created and managed by Gabriel Hemery. In 2013, 20 hectares (12 acres) of the remainder of the farmland, including the redundant buildings, was gifted to another charity the Sylva Foundation. In 2016 the charity moved its main office to the site and established the Sylva Wood Centre, which provides a hub for small businesses and craftspeople who design, innovate or make in wood. In 2017 the Sylva Foundation created the Wittenhams Community Orchard and Future Forest on surrounding land.

== Buildings ==
The Church of England parish church of Saint Mary, begun around 1120, is on the site of a previous Saxon church. The chancel arch survives from the Norman building; the aisles and tower are later additions. The font is a rare Norman lead one; it was later encased in wood, and this preserved it from iconoclastic Parliamentarian soldiers in the 17th century. The church has the smallest monument in England a small stone effigy of Gilbert de Clare. The first female Scottish electrical engineer Evelyn Roxburgh is buried in the graveyard at the church. A Methodist chapel was built in 1820, and later converted into a butcher's, a general store, and a Post Office. It was disfranchised in 2006 and is now a private house. The base of the village preaching cross dates from the 7th century. Saint Birinus preached here when he brought Christianity to the area.

Cruck Cottage can be architecturally dated to being around 800 years old. The building housing Pendon Museum is a model railway interactive museum set up by Roye England. Its site was The Three Poplars public house. Declining trade forced its sale in 1954 and for a time it traded as a Youth Hostel, being close to the North Wessex Downs and the Thames Path. Other pubs include The Plough, and The Vine (now The Vine and Spice Indian restaurant). North of the village is the Barley Mow Inn (nowadays just a pub), which is closer to Clifton Hampden but is on the Wittenham side of the parish boundary. The Machine Man was disfranchised in 2003. The Sylva Wood Centre provides a hub for small businesses and craftspeople who design, innovate or make in wood, including incubation facilities for new businesses linked with City of Oxford College.

== Amenities ==
The village has a sports club: Long Wittenham Athletics Club, which is based at Bodkins Field. This and other flat fields around the village have often been used as impromptu landing sites by hot-air balloonists. Beyond the eastern edge of the village is Neptune Wood, planted in 2005 as one of 33 British Trafalgar Wood commemorating the 200th anniversary of the Battle of Trafalgar. The Wittenhams Community Orchard and Future Forest were created by the Sylva Foundation in 2017 on land to the south of the village, providing public access via a network of permitted paths.

== Twinning ==
Long Wittenham is twinned with the village of Thaon in Normandy, France.

== Sources ==
- Page, W.H.; Ditchfield, P.H., eds. (1924). A History of the County of Berkshire, Volume 4. Victoria County History. pp. 384–390.
- Pevsner, Nikolaus (1966). Berkshire. The Buildings of England. Harmondsworth: Penguin Books. pp. 170–171.
