= Joseph Tubb =

Joseph Tubb may refer to:

- Joseph Tubb (poet)
- Joseph Tubb (politician)
