= Paradise Wood =

Coordinates: 51.637°N 1.199°W

Paradise Wood is a research woodland established by the Earth Trust (formerly Northmoor Trust) between the villages of Little Wittenham and Long Wittenham in Oxfordshire England. It has evolved to become the largest collection of hardwood forestry trials in Britain.

Planning for the wood started in 1992 and tree planting began in 1993. The Research Woodland was originally conceived and developed by Gabriel Hemery and was established as a centre for research into the improvement of the quality and productivity hardwood trees. The ultimate aim is to create a woodland of 55 hectares in area. It contains a large number of trials supervised by the Future Trees Trust.

On the northern edge of Paradise Wood a small community woodland was planted in 2005 to commemorate the 200th anniversary of the Battle of Trafalgar. It was named after HMS Neptune as part of a project with the Woodland Trust. It provides free public access and contains some oak trials.

== Research trials ==
Ash

- Breeding Seedling Orchard of ash established in 1993 with BIHIP.
- This research trial has become increasingly important over the last few years since ash dieback arrived in Britain in 2012. The disease was first recorded in the woodland in 2015.
- This trial is part of the Living Ash Project.

Beech

- Provenance trial of beech established in 2005 on behalf of Forest Research and an EU research network.

Cherry

- A clonal trial of wild cherry established in 2005 on behalf of East Malling Research (then Horticulture Research International) as part of a research programme to develop the WildStar TM clones.

Oak

- A provenance trial of oak collected across the UK and Ireland.

Walnut

- A provenance trial of walnut collected from Kyrgyzstan and 12 other countries across Asia and Europe.
- A silviculture trial of walnut testing walnut in mixture with various species including nitrogen fixing trees and shrubs.
- A trial of hybrid walnut.

Agroforestry or 'silvo-poultry'

- The Poultry In Natural Environments (PINE) experiment ran for a number years in the 2000s, where free-range broilers were reared under newly planted trees. The system was reportedly very robust economically.

== Volunteering ==
In 2012, Earthwatch Institute, a global non-profit that teams volunteers with scientists to conduct important environmental research, launched a program called "Paradise Wood - Experimental Plantation in England." This unique project, run jointly by Earthwatch and the Earth Trust, allows volunteers to join studies to help forest managers grow trees successfully in light of predicted climate change.
