= Sylva Foundation =

British charitable organization

Coordinates: 51.641687°N 1.205639°W

Sylva Foundation logo

The Sylva Foundation is an environmental organisation focusing on trees and forestry established in 2006, and registered as a charity in England and Wales in 2009 and with the Office of the Scottish Charity Regulator in 2010. The organisation was co-founded by Sir Martin Wood and Dr Gabriel Hemery. Its office is at the Sylva Wood Centre in Long Wittenham in Oxfordshire, England.

Sylva Foundation is a national charity supporting sustainable forest management. Sylva Foundation's main programmes are Forestry, Education, Science, and Wood.

In 2013, 20 hectares (12 acres) of land near Long Wittenham was gifted to the charity. In 2016 the charity moved its main office to the site and established the Sylva Wood Centre, which provides a hub for small businesses and craftspeople who design, innovate or make in wood. In 2017 the Sylva Foundation created the Wittenhams Community Orchard and Future Forest on its land.

The Sylva Foundation is a sister charity of Earth Trust, previously known as the Northmoor Trust, and the Oxford Trust, which were also set up by Sir Martin Wood alongside Lady Audrey Wood.

== Science ==
Sylva runs the forestry think-tank, Forestry Horizons, which operates at national and international levels seeking to advance and support forest science and forest policy. Its main activity is the lead partner in delivering a national survey concerning British woodlands, the British Woodlands Survey series.

== Education ==
Sylva Foundation runs a number of education projects, including the OneOak project launched in 2009 following the life story of one oak tree.

== Forestry ==
Sylva Foundation supports sustainable forest management across Britain via the myForest service. Woodland owners and managers can map and measure their woodlands using web-based tools. Sylva Foundation has close links with many organisations as it seeks to work as a catalyst for innovation and as bridge between forestry-related organisations.

== Wood ==
The charity opened the Sylva Wood Centre as a hub for small businesses and craftspeople who design, innovate or make in wood. The centre provides dedicated space, equipment and an inspiring community of woodworking professionals. Alongside business units for established businesses it provides facilities to support business incubation.
