= Warborough =

Village in Oxfordshire, England

Coordinates: 51.639°N 1.137°W

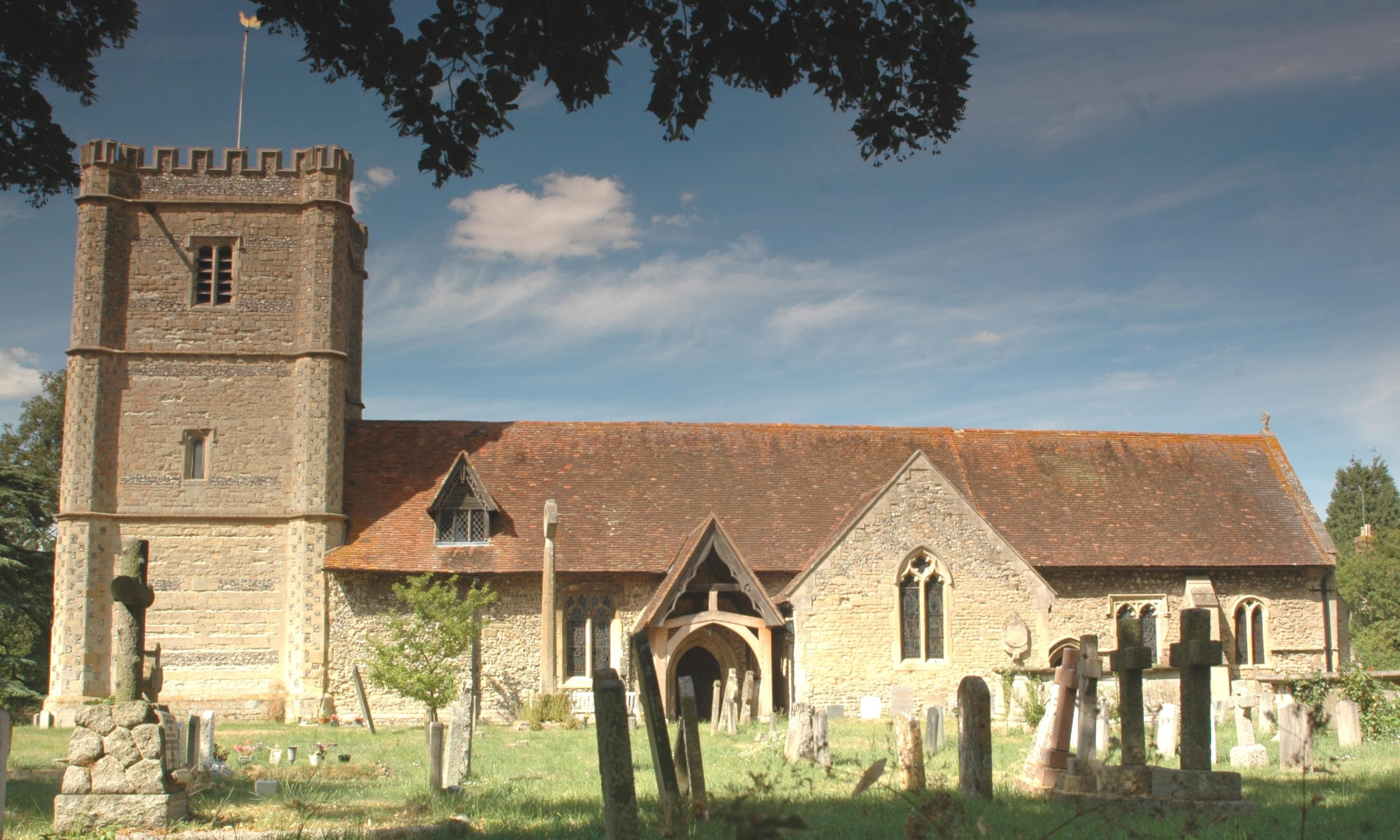
- St. Laurence's parish church

- Location within Oxfordshire
- Area: 6.95 km^{2} (2.68 sq mi)
- Population: 987 (parish, including Shillingford, 2011)
  - Density: 142/km^{2} (370/sq mi)
- OS grid reference: SU5993
- Civil parish: Warborough
- District: South Oxfordshire
- Shire county: Oxfordshire
- Region: South East
- Country: England
- Sovereign state: United Kingdom
- Post town: Wallingford
- Postcode district: OX10
- Dialling code: 01865
- Police: Thames Valley
- Fire: Oxfordshire
- Ambulance: South Central
- UK Parliament: Henley and Thame
- Website: Warborough Parish Council

Warborough is a village and civil parish in South Oxfordshire, about 2.5 miles (4 km) north of Wallingford and about 9 miles (14 km) south of Oxford. The parish also includes the hamlet of Shillingford, south of Warborough beside the River Thames.

== History ==
The toponym has evolved over the centuries. A property deed written about 1370 calls the village Wareburewe. In 1086 Warborough was part of the large royal estate of Benson. The Church of England parish church of Saint Laurence was originally a chapel of the parish of Benson. There is a record of the Empress Matilda giving the benefice of Benson, including chapels at Nettlebed and Warborough, to the Augustinian Abbey at nearby Dorchester in about 1140, and for most of the Middle Ages Warborough was regarded as part of the parish of Dorchester. It remained part of the Dorchester peculiar until 1847, but functioned largely as an independent parish from the Middle Ages.

== St Laurences' Parish church ==
Perhaps the oldest item in the church is the font, which dates from late in the 12th century. The chancel has Decorated Gothic features from the early part of the 13th century, including the east window and one of the windows on the south side. The other windows of the chancel are later Perpendicular Gothic additions. The nave and south transept are Perpendicular features from the 14th century, although the transept arch and window are Decorated. The Gothic Revival architects G.F. Bodley and Thomas Garner restored the chancel in 1881. The Perpendicular Gothic windows in the nave are likewise Victorian. The bell-tower was rebuilt in 1666. Its two oldest bells were cast in 1618, and two more date from 1675. It had a ring of six bells, but in 1955 two new bells were cast and hung increasing the ring to eight.

== Buildings ==
Warborough has a number of half-timbered and thatched houses, including a cruck cottage 100 yards (91 m) southwest of the parish church. A date stone on the manor house on the north side of the village green says it was built in 1696. The vicarage is Georgian. Near the cruck cottage is a terrace of four cottages designed in 1952 by the architect Lionel Brett. The maltster Joseph Tubb (1805–79) lived in Warborough. In 1844–45 he carved the Poem Tree at Wittenham Clumps. Warborough and Shillingford Festival was founded in 1965. It is held annually in July.

== Amenities ==
Warborough has a village shop, a post office and a public house (The Six Bells). It used to be served by two other pubs, but these have long since closed. The village has a pre-school and a Church of England primary school. Most secondary school pupils from the parish attend Wallingford School. The village green has a playground, a cricket pitch and football goals. To the east of the village green is a large allotments field, tennis courts, a table tennis table and cricket nets. Warborough & Shillingford Cricket Club have a large junior section, a women's and girls’ section and a senior XI who play friendly declaration cricket every Sunday through the season. There is a large village hall, The Greet Memorial Hall which hosts classes including a short mat bowls club and a jujitsu club, is the venue for parish council meetings and is also available to hire. There is also a small church hall for hire - St Laurence Hall, which hosts various classes including the Warborough and Shillingford Women's Institute, There is also a sports pavilion which is available to rent outside of cricket club usage.

== In popular culture ==
The village and surrounding areas have been the subject of filming locations for the crime drama Midsomer Murders.

== Gallery ==
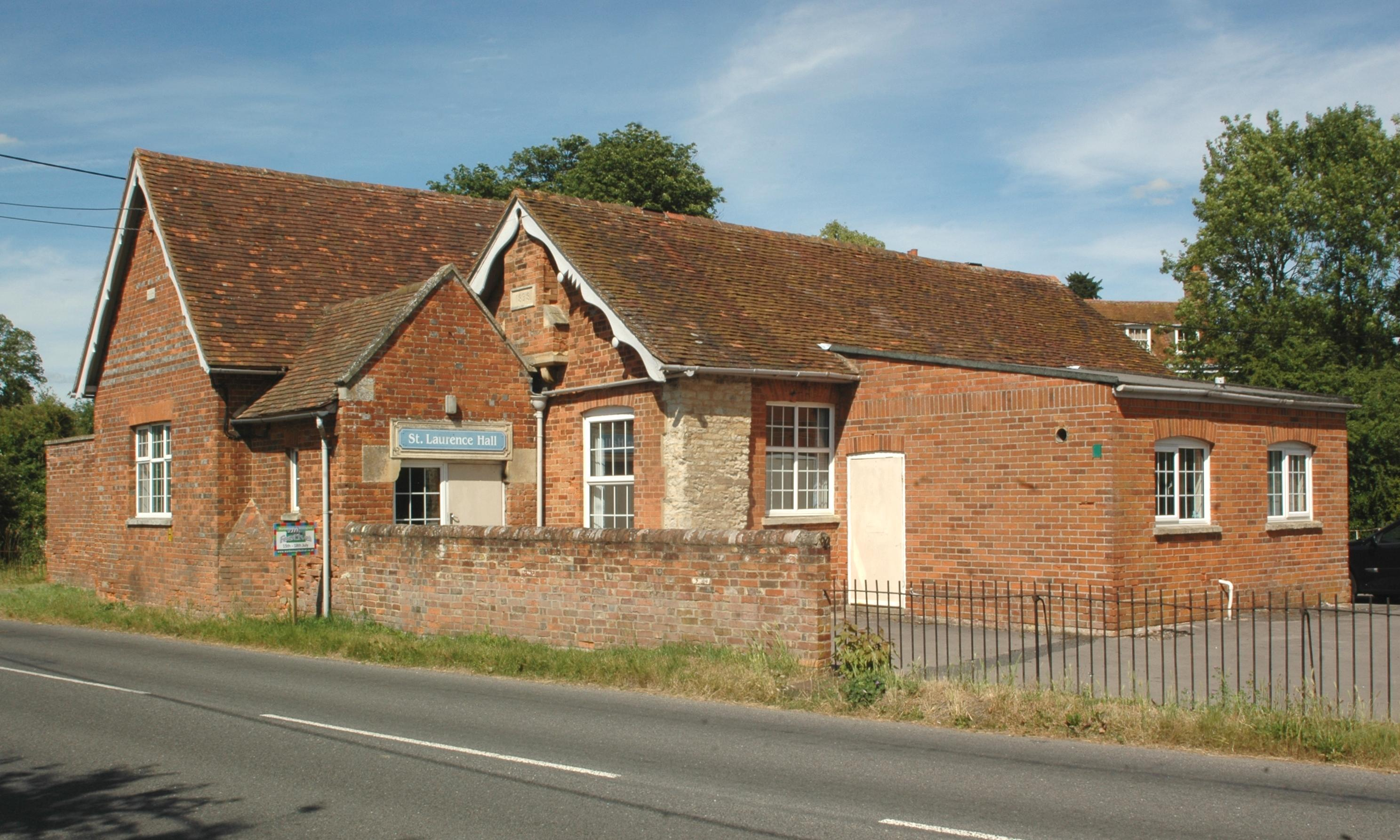
The former parish school, now St. Laurence Hall

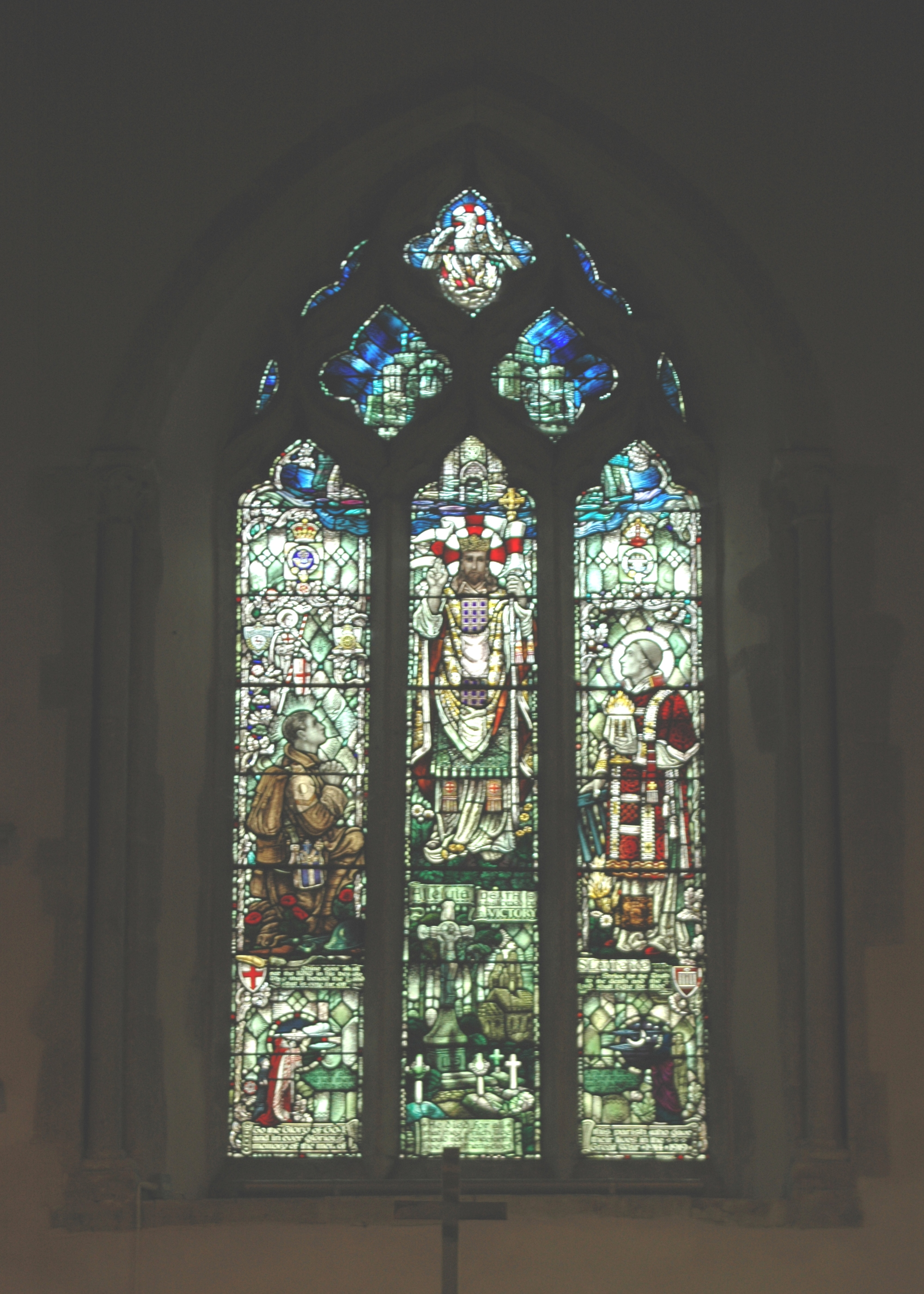
13th-century east window of the chancel of St. Laurence' parish church, with 20th-century stained glass memorial to parishioners lost in the First World War

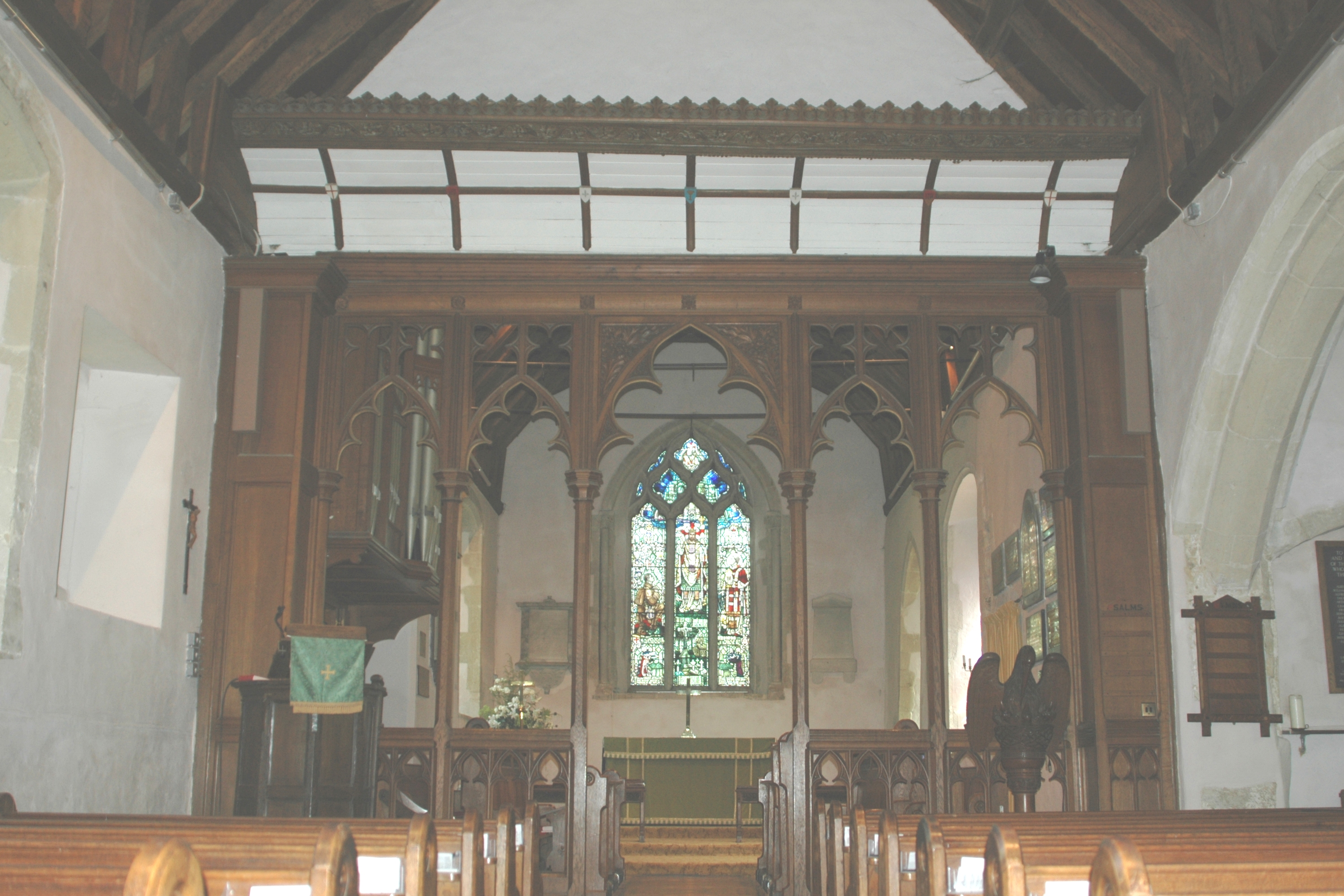
13th-century early Decorated Gothic chancel, restored in 1881

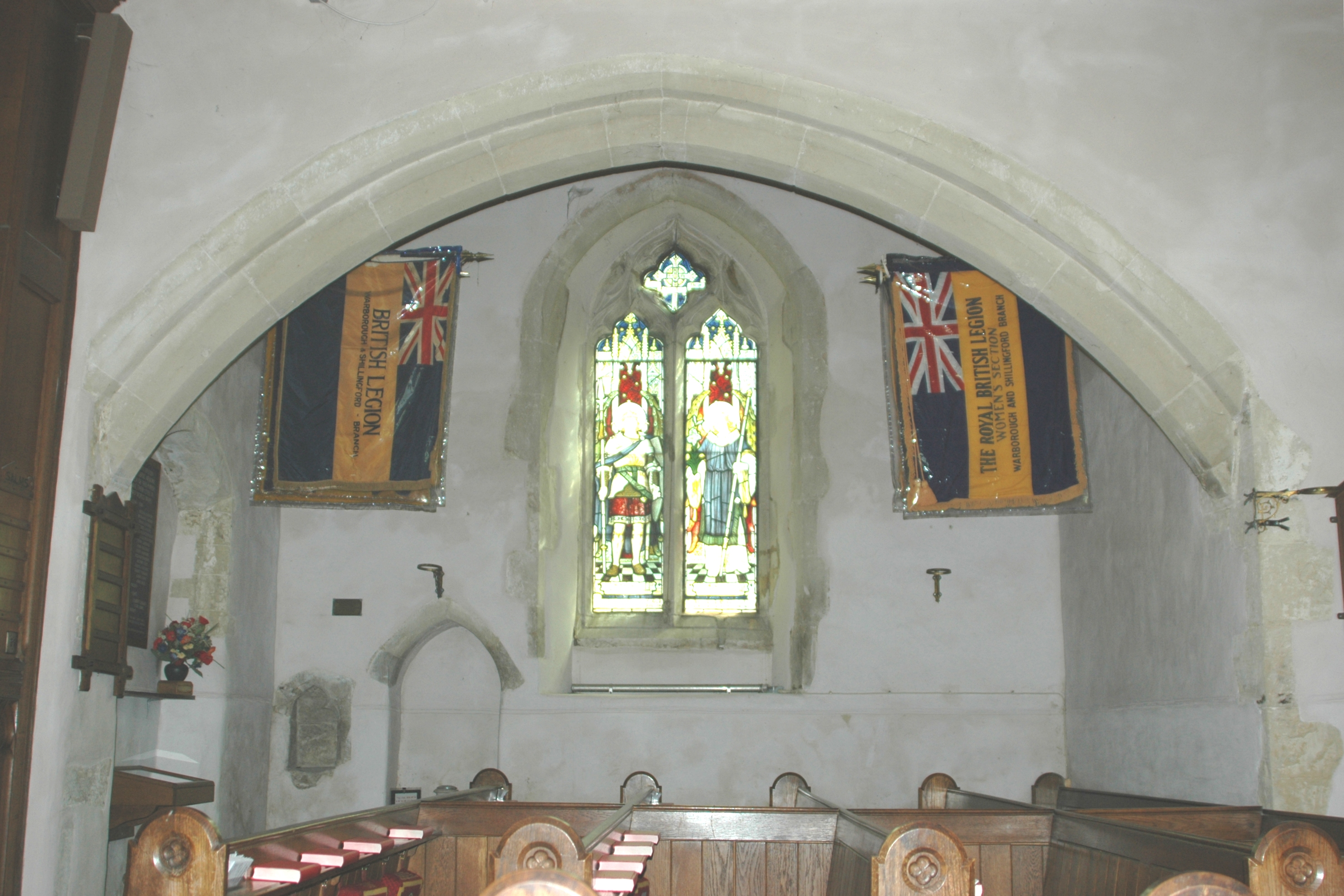
14th-century late Decorated Gothic south transept

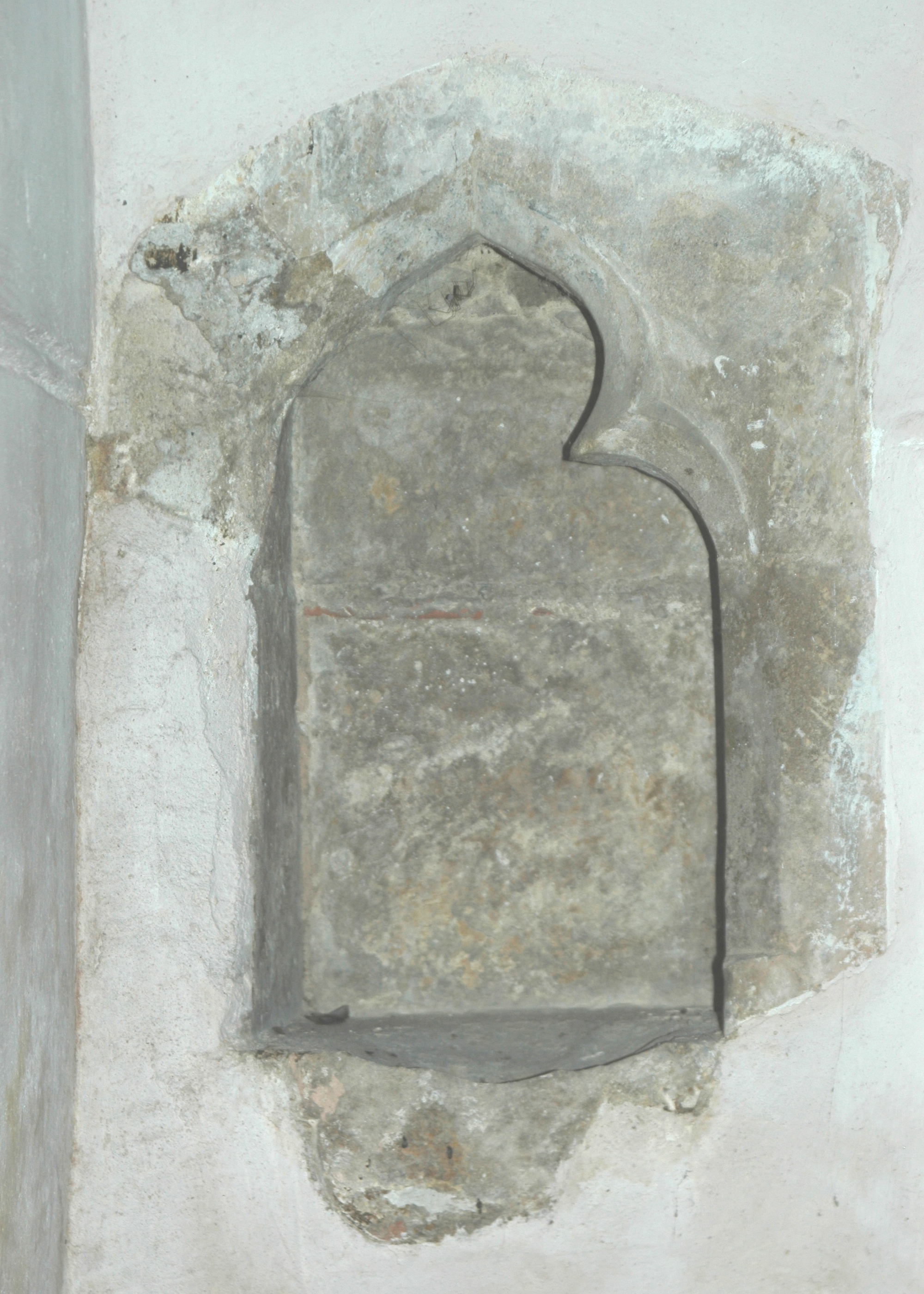
14th-century Decorated Gothic cusped piscina of south transept

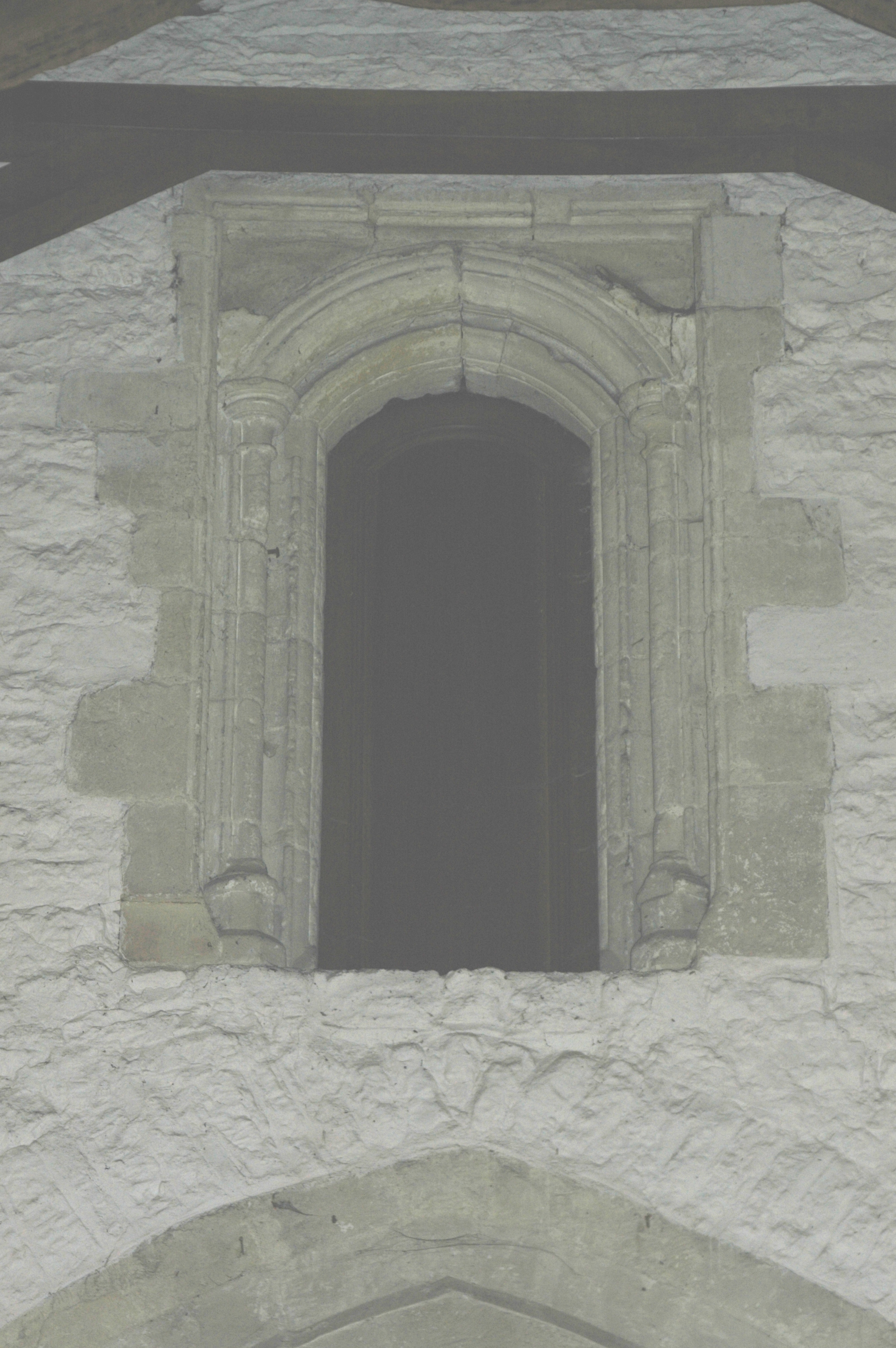
Door to 17th-century tower, above the tower arch and just under the nave roof

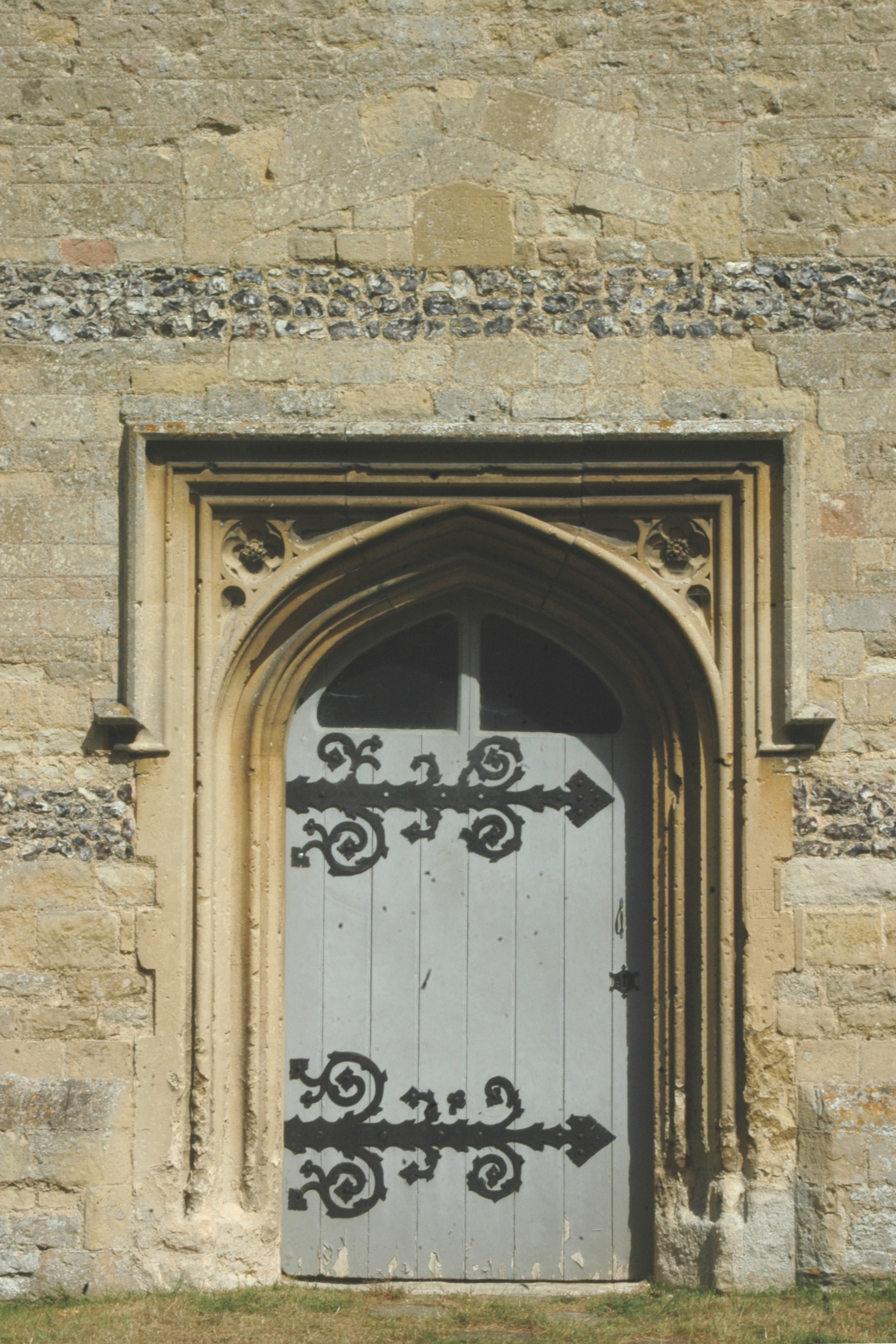
Gothic Survival west door to 17th-century tower

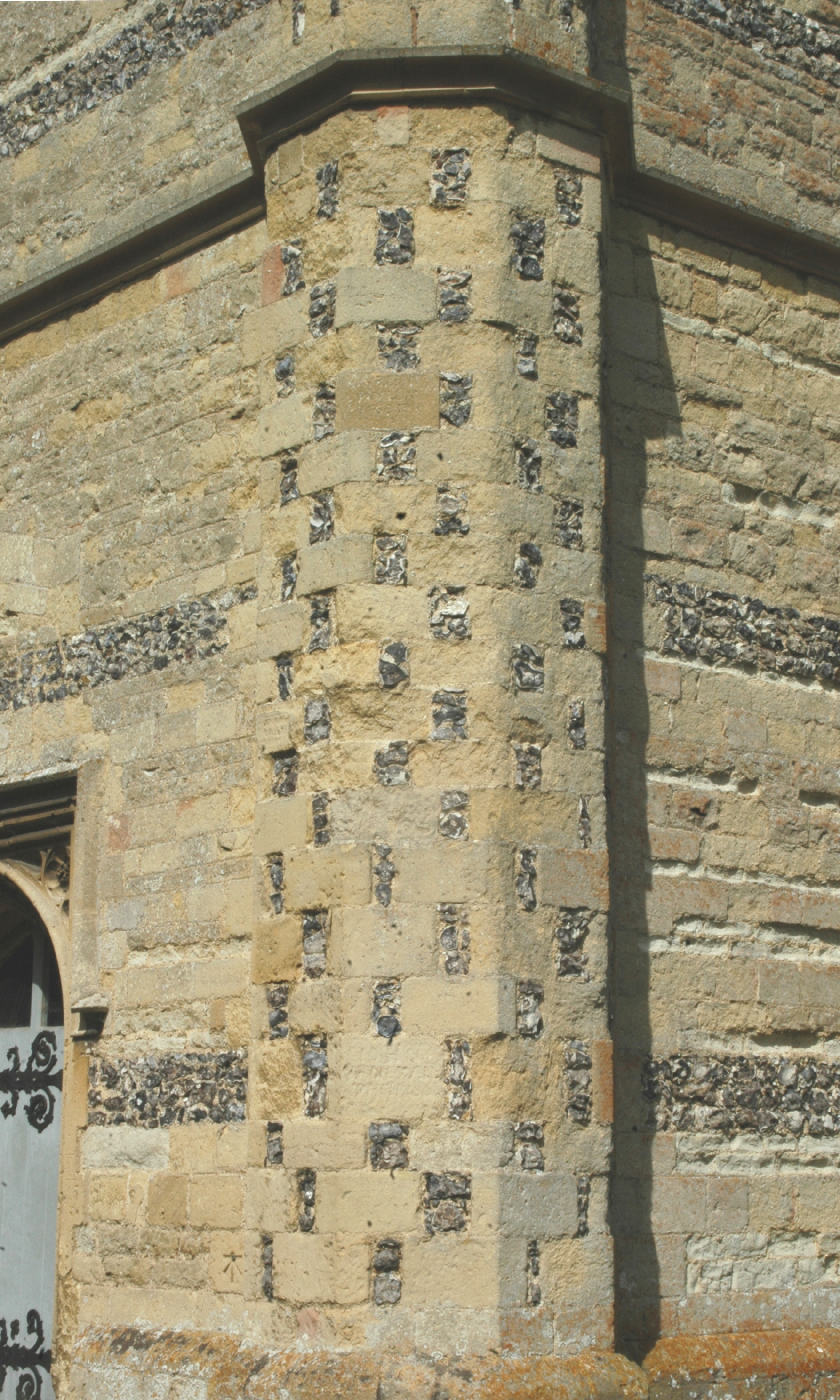
South-west buttress of 17th-century tower

== Sources ==
- Lobel, Mary D, ed. (1962). A History of the County of Oxford, Volume 7: Thame and Dorchester Hundreds. Dorchester. Victoria County History. pp. 39–64.
- Maxwell Lyte, H.C., ed. (1900). A Descriptive Catalogue of Ancient Deeds. Vol. 3. pp. 399–406.
- Mileson, Stephen (2010). "Victoria County History of Oxfordshire. Work in progress. Warborough".
- Page, W.H., ed. (1907). A History of the County of Oxford, Volume 2: Ecclesiastical History, etc. The Abbey of Dorchester. Victoria County History. Archibald Constable & Co. pp. 87–90.
- Page, W.H.; Ditchfield, P.H., eds. (1924). A History of the County of Berkshire, Volume 4. Little Wittenham. Victoria County History. pp. 380–384.
- Sherwood, Jennifer; Pevsner, Nikolaus (1974). Oxfordshire. The Buildings of England. Harmondsworth: Penguin Books. pp. 821–822. ISBN 0-14-071045-0.
