= Wittenham Clumps =

Pair of hills in Oxfordshire, England

Coordinates: 51.62845°N 1.17937°W

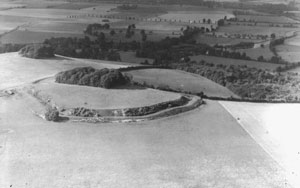
Wittenham Camp in 1939; aerial photograph by Major George Allen (1891–1940)

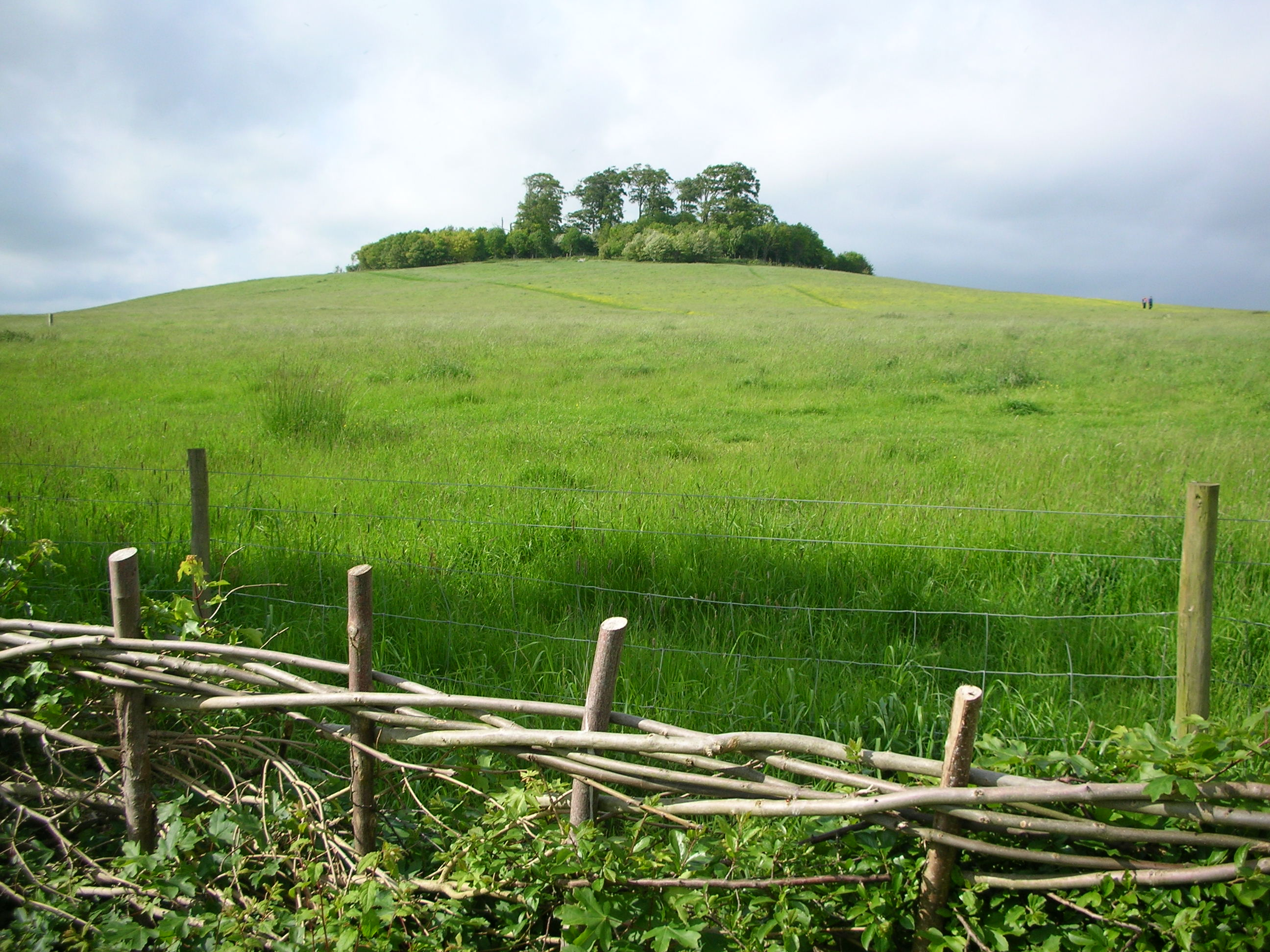
Round Hill from the south at Wittenham Clumps

Wittenham Clumps are a pair of wooded chalk hills in the Thames Valley, in the civil parish of Little Wittenham, in the historic county of Berkshire, although since 1974 administered as part of South Oxfordshire district. They lie in the National Character Area of the Upper Thames Clay Vales.

The higher of the two, Round Hill, is 390 feet (120 m) above sea-level. The 350-foot (110 m) Castle Hill is about 380 yards (350 m) south-east and was the site of an Iron Age hill fort. A third hill, not normally considered one of The Clumps, is Brightwell Barrow, further to the south-east.

The grassed slopes of The Clumps lead up to summits wooded by the oldest beech tree plantings in England, dating to the 1740s. Standing over 70 metres above their surroundings, the Clumps have a prominent appearance and panoramic views, with the north slopes overlooking villages and towns whose sites mark some of the first settlements of the English. The view from The Clumps was described by the artist Paul Nash, who first saw them in 1911, as "a beautiful legendary country haunted by old gods long forgotten".

The Clumps are the most visited outdoor site in the administrative county of Oxfordshire, attracting over 200,000 visitors a year. A car park was added in 1971, and the extensive network of paths are accessible by foot all year round. A path through the wooded area at the top of Round Hill has enabled access since 2005, after being closed for twenty years. The site and its surroundings are maintained as a Nature Reserve by the Earth Trust.

== Toponymy ==
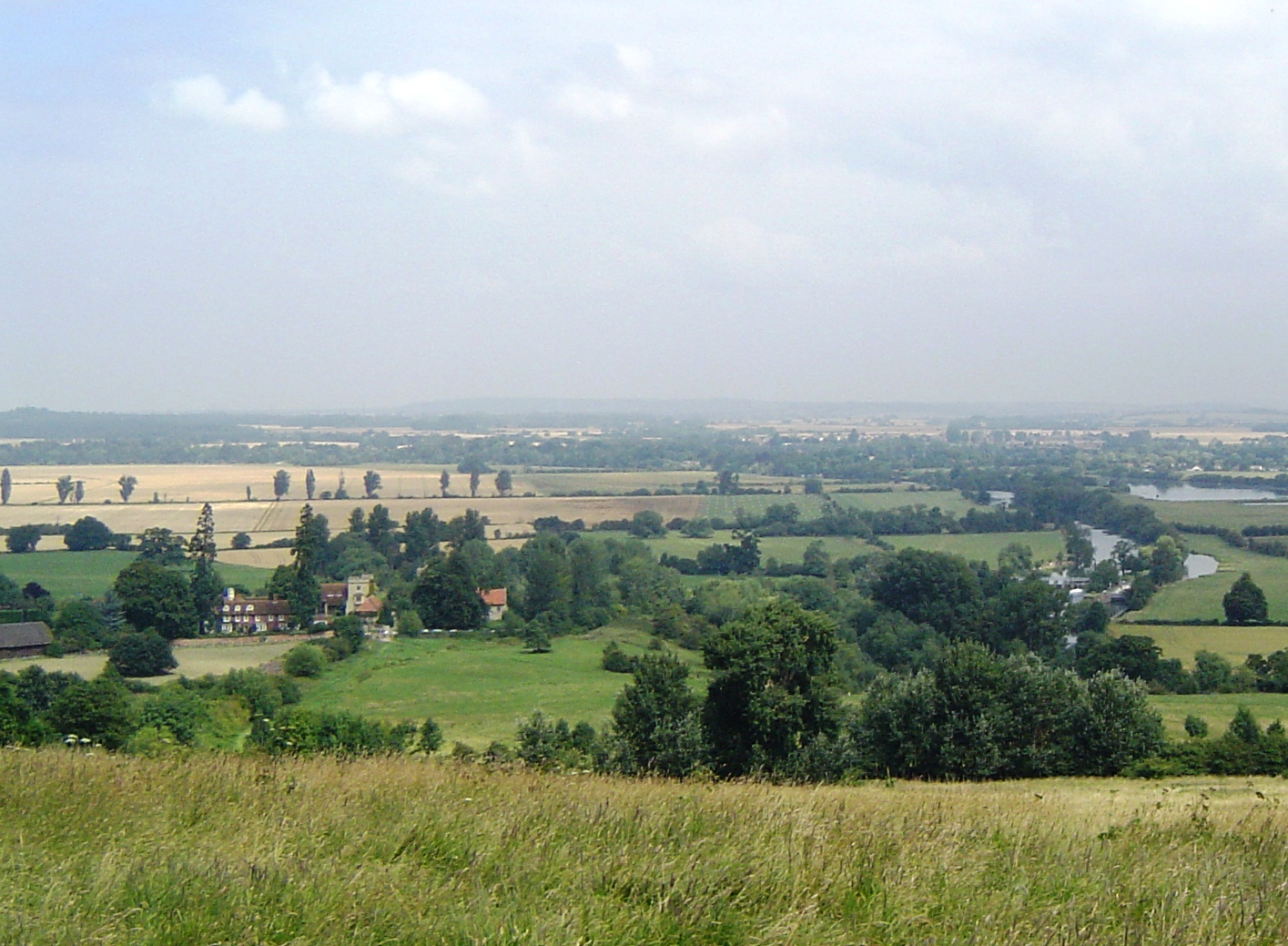
View from Round Hill with Day's Lock and the River Thames curving along the tree line to the left

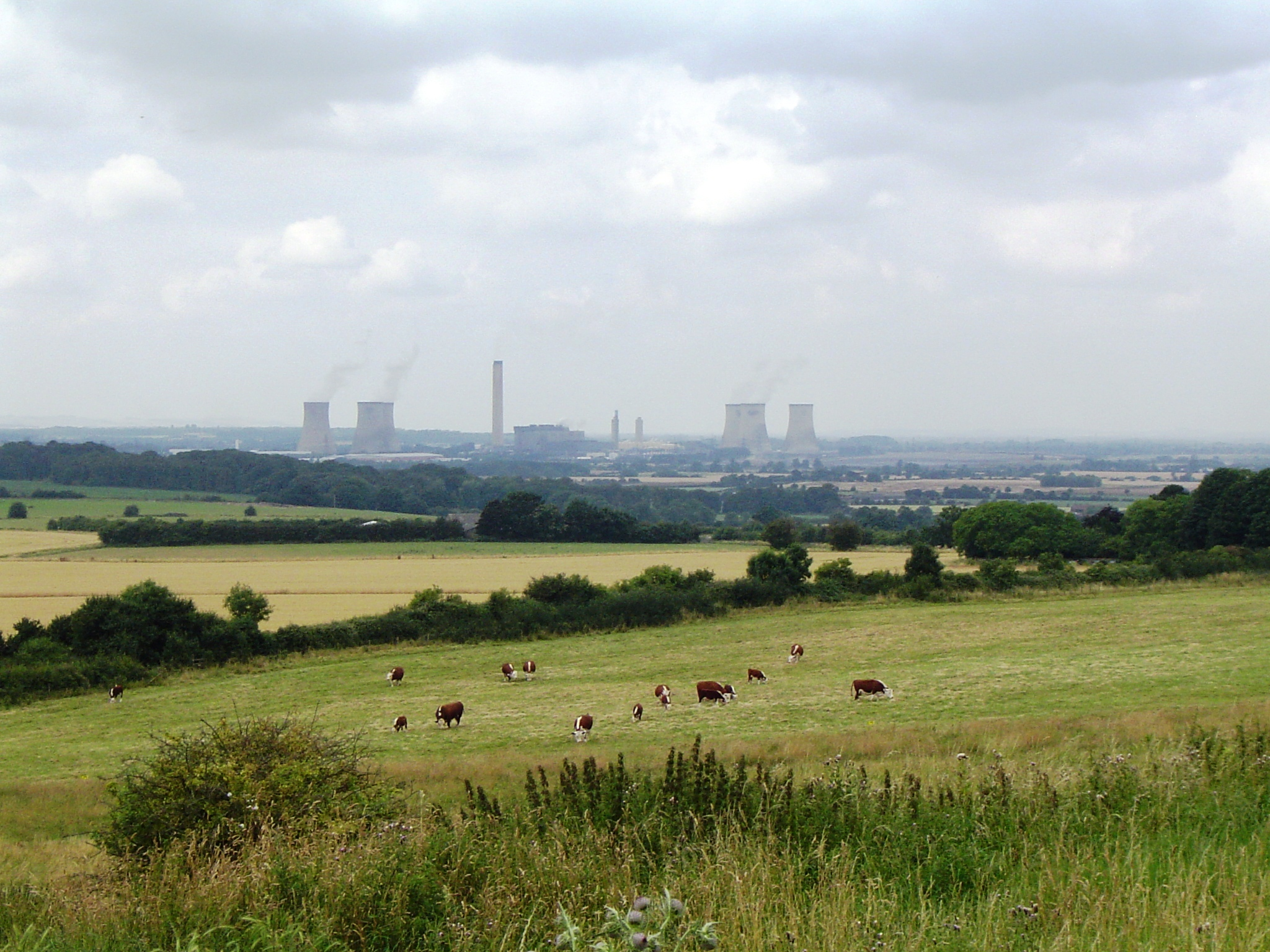
Didcot Power Station viewed from Wittenham Clumps showing the six hyperbolic cooling towers and the central flue gas stack

Strictly speaking, the name Wittenham Clumps refers to the wooded summits of these hills, which are themselves more properly referred to as the Sinodun Hills, the name Sinodun deriving from Celtic, Seno-Dunum, meaning 'Old Fort'. Alternatively, it has been suggested that the name is a scholarly creation, punning on the Latin 'sinus' (bosom). Other lesser-used and more colloquial names for the Clumps include the Berkshire Bubs (since the Clumps are in the historic county of Berkshire, though this area was transferred to Oxfordshire administratively in 1974) and Mother Dunch's Buttocks (after a local Lady of the Manor named Dunch).

On Sinodun Hill is a hollow named the Money-Pit and a clump of trees named the Cuckoo Pen. The Money-Pit is supposedly the location of a treasure hoard guarded by a raven, and the Cuckoo Pen gets its name from the local belief that a trapped cuckoo would ensure eternal Summer.

== Location ==
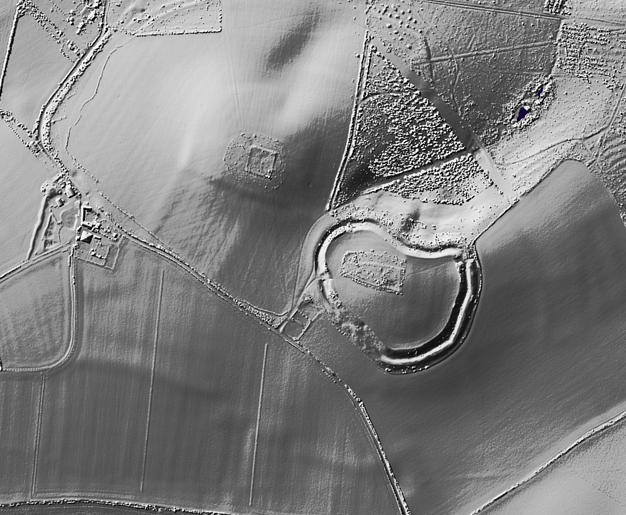
Wittenham Clumps LIDAR topography

Wittenham Clumps are located at grid reference SU569925, close to the River Thames, and good views can be had from the Thames Path along the river. The panoramic views of the Berkshire and Oxfordshire countryside from the Clumps themselves are also spectacular; a viewpoint guide on the north side of Round Hill gives directions to many sights, the furthest being Faringdon Folly, a tower built on another Iron Age hillfort 27 kilometres (17 mi) to the west. Day's Lock and Dorchester Abbey are clearly visible in the valley to the north, with the 15-storey Plowman Tower in Northway, Oxford visible on the horizon, 14 kilometres (8.7 mi) away. The white-walled reactor buildings of the Joint European Torus, site of the world's first successful controlled nuclear fusion experiments, can be seen around 6 km to the north-west. To the west, there is the town of Didcot, the chimneys of the gas-fired Didcot B Power Station visible. Formerly, the 110-metre-tall (360 ft) cooling towers of Didcot A Power Station, constructed in the late 1960s, dominated the skyline around Didcot; they were demolished in phases from 2014 to 2020. To the north-east is Little Wittenham Wood, which borders the Thames, and to the south-east is Brightwell Barrow. The Didcot A Power Station Flue Gas Stack could be seen from the Clumps and from the Shard in London, Greater London but the chimney was demolished in 2020.

The wooded area at the top of Castle Hill, which contains a public footpath, was closed indefinitely due to the danger of falling trees, but has since reopened with a warning sign. The entrance to the wooded area atop Round Hill also carries a warning of falling branches due to fungal decay of many of its trees.

== Archaeology ==
There is a hillfort on Castle Hill. The earliest earthworks date to the late Bronze Age. More banks and ditches were added during the early Iron Age. Excavation has revealed that the Iron Age inhabitants caught fish and wild boar as well as herding cattle and sheep. There is also evidence of barley and wheat cultivation. The fort appears to have been abandoned by the late Iron Age, the next occupants being Romans. A 2004 episode of the Channel 4 archaeological television programme Time Team focused on the Clumps. In 2004, Castle Hill was under excavation by Oxford Archaeology, and Time Team was charged with investigating the surrounding landscape to find any trace of activity that could be associated with the Clumps.

Over a period of three days, Time Team surveyed a total of seven hectares using ground-penetrating radar. The original focus was the previously unexplored Round Hill, but difficulties in carrying out geophysical studies on its tree-covered crest forced the team to abandon their original goal. Moving down the southern slopes, however, many hidden features emerged, including enclosure ditches, pits, possible buildings, and other clusters of anomalies. The geophysics highlighted a large rectilinear enclosure, which was subsequently singled out for excavation. This revealed the remains of a Romano-British house with tesserae (mosaic) floors and painted wall plaster on the southern slope of Round Hill. The area also contained an Iron-Age cobbled floor, together with post holes that could have related to a structure.

Further investigations found Iron Age rubbish pits distributed all over the valley, suggesting widespread settlement throughout the period. Pottery finds indicated that most activity took place in the earlier and later phases of the period, with a quieter occupation phase in the middle. The geophysics surveys also uncovered more suspected Iron Age enclosures along with what appeared to be a Roman road, which would have been associated with the site.

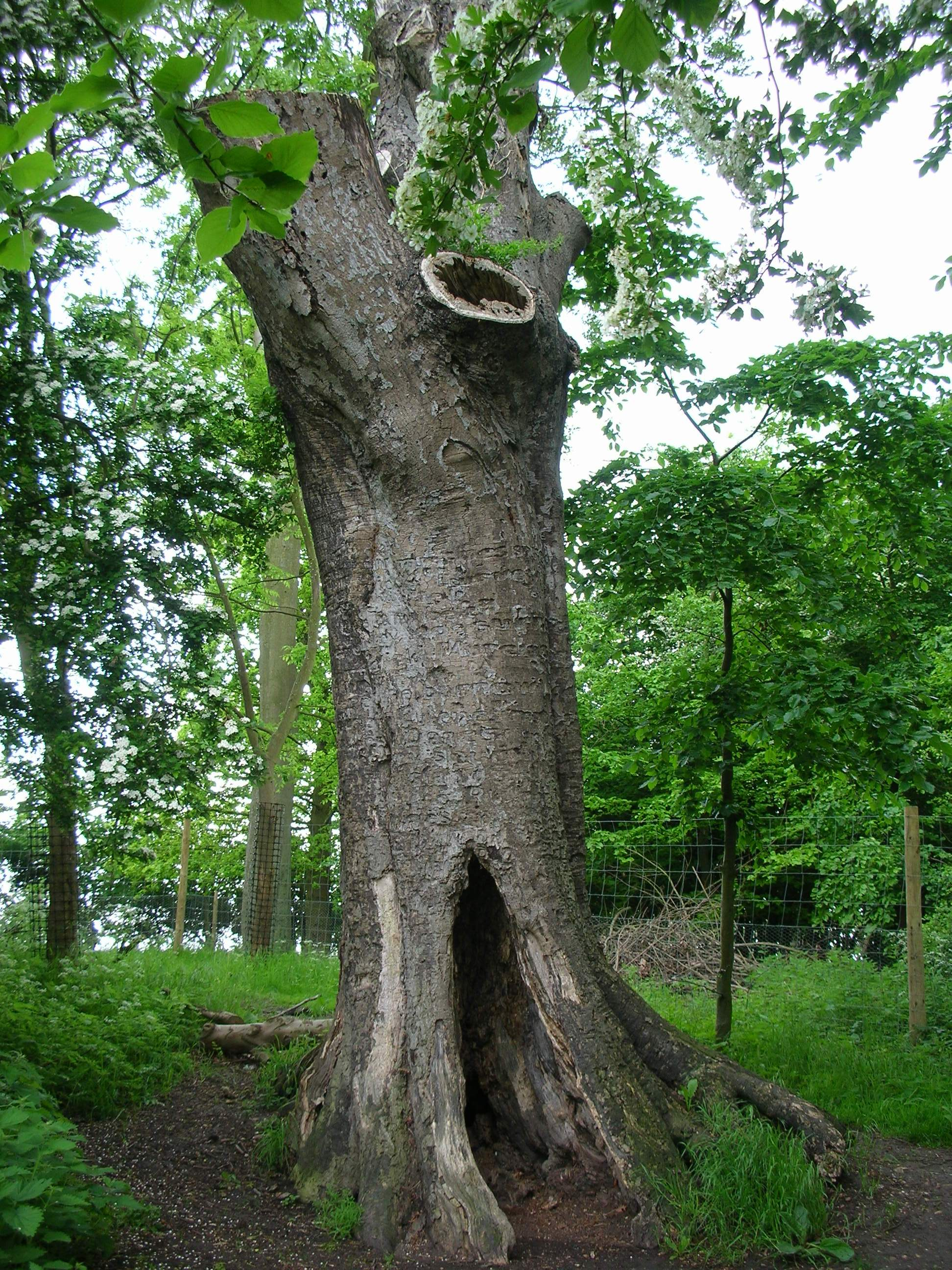
The Poem Tree, Castle Hill.

The overall chronology suggested by the excavations is of the site being occupied since the Bronze Age around 1000 BC, the hillfort and surrounding farms dating from around 600 BC, followed by a move down towards the southern part of the site around 300 BC. The area was then abandoned, until the construction of the Roman villa.

Among the many artefacts found in the area are an oval bronze shield around 35 cm in diameter, retrieved from the nearby river Isis in 1836 and the 70 cm long Wittenham Sword and scabbard, found in 1982 and dating from the Late Iron Age (120 BC - AD 43)

In February 2021, archaeologists headed by Chris Casswell from DigVentures announced the discovery of at least 15 roundhouses dating from 400 to 100 BC. and remains of a Roman villa dating from 3rd to early 4th century CE. According to excavators, members of a noble family would have lived in this Roman villa. Researchers have also revealed some Roman kitchen utensils and an Iron Age "fridge" or pantry-ceramic food storage containers to keep food cool and safe in a pit dug into the ground.

In January 2024, archaeologists from DigVentures found an iron age workshop dating from between 770 and 515 BC. The workshop was found downslope from the hillfort.

== Poetry and art ==
The eastern side of Castle Hill is the location of the Victorian 'Poem Tree', a beech tree which had a poem carved into it by Joseph Tubb of Warborough Green in 1844–45. The tree, which died in the 1990s, collapsed in 2012; there is now a stone commemorating the 150th anniversary of the carving.

Wittenham Clumps is said to be where Matthew Prior wrote Henry and Emma, and this is commemorated by a plaque. Wittenham Clumps were repeatedly painted by the 20th-century British artist Paul Nash.

In 2007, Radiohead filmed a music video for the song, Faust Arp on The Wittenham Clumps. The finale to the Black Mirror episode, Shut Up and Dance, was filmed in the same spot, with Radiohead's song Exit Music (For a Film) featured.

In 2021, Robin Alexander Lucas published a new poem about The Wittenham Clumps, the Money Pit and the Raven that is said to guard it, entitled The Money Pit – or – The Sinodun Hoard. It was printed on the reverse side of a decorative map of The Wittenham Clumps, published by Cittern Press, (ISBN 978-1-8384385-9-3, Cittern Press, 2021). The poem is included on the front of the second edition of Lucas’s map, published in 2024, (ISBN 978-1-8384385-8-6, Cittern Press, 2024).
