= Salamander letter =

Forged letter describing an alternate version of Mormon history

The salamander letter was a controversial forged document about the history of the Latter Day Saint movement. The letter was one of hundreds of documents concerning the history of the Latter Day Saint movement that surfaced in the early 1980s. The salamander letter presented a view of the life of the movement's founder, Joseph Smith, that stood sharply at odds with the commonly accepted version of the early progression of the church Smith established.

Initially accepted by some document experts and collectors, and rejected by others, the salamander letter generated much discussion and debate inside and outside the Latter Day Saint movement. Kenneth W. Rendell, a prominent dealer of historical papers, lent credence to the salamander letter by stating that the ink, paper, and postmark were all consistent with the period; he concluded that "there is no indication that the document is a forgery." The document was later demonstrated to be a forgery created by Mark Hofmann, who had been responsible for the forgery of many other notable documents. Rendell then recast his conclusion, stating that while there was "the absence of any indication of forgery in the letter itself, there was also no evidence that it was genuine."

== Contents ==
The contents of the letter implied a magical aspect to Smith's life, a controversial subject debated amongst scholars of Latter Day Saint history. The salamander letter was supposedly written by Martin Harris to W. W. Phelps, an early convert in the Latter Day Saint movement. Harris served for a short period of time as scribe for the translation of the golden plates, and assisted in the financing of the first printing of the Book of Mormon. A joint statement by Harris and two other men appears in the front of the Book of Mormon stating that he was shown by an angel the golden plates from which the book was translated.

The letter presented a version of the recovery of the golden plates which contrasted with the orthodox version of events as related by Joseph Smith and the Latter Day Saint movement, which would have, if true, confirmed some controversial aspects of Smith's life. Smith had been accused of "treasure digging" and using a "seer stone," which was later confirmed by the Church of Jesus Christ of Latter-day Saints (LDS Church).

According to the letter, when Smith dug up the plates a "salamander" appeared, which transformed itself into a spirit that refused to give Smith the plates unless his brother, Alvin Smith, was also present. This would have been very difficult, as Alvin was dead according to this letter at the time of the alleged appearance. This reference may have been an attempt by Hofmann to associate the recovery of the gold plates to a rumor that Alvin's grave was dug up by Smith's family to use Alvin's remains in a magical ceremony, or it could have been a reuse of the testimony of Joseph Knight, Sr., about the same demand to bring his brother (who would die the next month), as recounted in his Reminiscences.

Hofmann's use of a salamander drew upon legends about certain animals having supernatural powers. Hofmann may have been inspired by the early anti-Mormon book, Mormonism Unvailed (1834), which claimed that a toad-like animal was rumored to have appeared to Smith in conjunction with the recovery of the plates.

=== Text ===
Palmyra October 23d 1830

Dear Sir

Your letter of yesterday is received & I hasten to answer as fully as I can—Joseph Smith Jr first come to my notice in the year 1824 in the summer of that year I contracted with his father to build a fence on my property in the corse [sic] of that work I approach Joseph & ask how it is in a half day you put up what requires your father & 2 brothers a full day working together he says I have not been with out assistance but can not say more only you better find out the next day I take the older Smith by the arm & he says Joseph can see any thing he wishes by looking at a stone Joseph often sees Spirits here with great kettles of coin money it was Spirits who brought up rock because Joseph made no attempt on their money I latter [sic] dream I converse with spirits which let me count their money when I awake I have in my hand a dollar coin which I take for a sign Joseph describes what I seen in every particular says he the spirits are grieved so I through [sic] back the dollar in the fall of the year 1827 I hear Joseph found a gold bible I take Joseph aside & he says it is true I found it 4 years ago with my stone but only just got it because of the enchantment the old spirit come to me 3 times in the same dream & says dig up the gold but when I take it up the next morning the spirit transfigured himself from a white salamander in the bottom of the hole & struck me 3 times & held the treasure & would not let me have it because I lay it down to cover over the hole when the spirit says do not lay it down Joseph says when can I have it the spirit says one year from to day if you obay [sic] me look to the stone after a few days he looks the spirit says bring your brother Alvin Joseph says he is dead shall I bring what remains but the spirit is gone Joseph goes to get the gold bible but the spirit says you did not bring your brother you can not have it look to the stone Joseph looks but can not see who to bring the spirit says I tricked you again look to the stone Joseph looks & sees his wife on the 22d day of Sept 1827 they get the gold bible—I give Joseph $50 to move him down to Pa Joseph says when you visit me I will give you a sign he gives me some hieroglyphics I take then to Utica Albany & New York in the last place Dr Mitchel gives me an introduction to Professor Anthon says he they are short hand Egyption [sic] the same what was used in ancient times bring me the old book & I will translate says I it is made of precious gold & is sealed from view says he I can not read a sealed book—Joseph found some giant silver spectacles with the plates he puts them in an old hat & in the darkness reads the words & in this way it is all translated & written down—about the middle of June 1829 Joseph takes me together with Oliver Cowdery & David Whitmer to have a view of the plates our names are appended to the book of Mormon which I had printed with my own money—space and time both prevent me from writing more at present if there is any thing further you wish to inquire I shall attend to it

Yours Respectfully
Martin Harris

== Initial assessments of authenticity ==
The letter was initially deemed authentic by experienced document examiners, however this conclusion is disputed. Critics of the LDS Church have used the letter as an argument against the validity of the religion. The letter was useful to these organizations because it seemed to support the opinions of Reed Durham, D. Michael Quinn, and others regarding "magical" aspects of Smith's religious experiences.

== Purchase and publicity ==
The letter was initially offered to Don Schmidt of the LDS Church Historical Department on January 3, 1984, by Lyn Jacobs, who wanted to trade it for a $10 Mormon gold piece. Jacobs told Schmidt that he got the letter from a collector in the east, referred by Mark Hofmann. Jacobs later changed his offer to a trade for a copy of a Book of Commandments. This offer was also rejected. Jacobs also suggested that Brent Ashworth might have an interest in it, although Hofmann had already showed a transcript of it to him and he had declared it to be fake. The contents of the letter also seemed too similar to Howe's Mormonism Unvailed to others in the LDS Church's Historical Department. The letter was also offered to other interested parties, including Jerald and Sandra Tanner, prominent critics of Mormonism. Although the letter's authenticity would have bolstered the Tanners' claims against the church, they expressed doubts as to its authenticity. A deal with the LDS Church was never reached. Hofmann finally sold the letter to Steven F. Christensen on January 6, 1984, for $40,000. Christensen wanted to try to authenticate it and then donate it to the LDS Church.

In the Church News on April 28, 1985, the LDS Church revealed the contents of the salamander letter. Alongside was included a First Presidency statement, quoting Gordon B. Hinckley: "No one, of course, can be certain that Martin Harris wrote the document. However, at this point we accept the judgment of the examiner that there is no indication that it is a forgery. This does not preclude the possibility that it may have been forged at a time when the Church had many enemies. It is, however, an interesting document of the times." At about this same time, the church also released a letter to its high school seminary program for youth, suggesting that seminary teachers not encourage debate about the salamander letter, but that they should tactfully answer genuine questions on the subject. FARMS (a research group composed of Mormon scholars) published several articles which examined the salamander letter, such as, "Why Might a Person in 1830 Connect an Angel With a Salamander?"

== Suspicion and resolution ==
Hofmann drew suspicion for discovering so many astounding documents that others had missed, including the so-called "Oath of a Freeman", which he was attempting to sell to the Library of Congress.

By early 1984, Jerald Tanner concluded there was significant doubt as to the salamander letter's authenticity. He even went so far as to publish an attack on the document, which surprised many scholars and students since this and other "discoveries" of important Mormon documents by Hofmann often appeared to bolster the Tanners' own arguments. By late 1984, Jerald Tanner questioned the authenticity of most if not all of Hofmann's "discoveries", based in large part on their unproven provenance. The Tanners did concur with Hofmann in contending that the LDS Church's apparent inability to discern the forged documents was evidence against church leadership being divinely inspired. John Tvedtnes, a Mormon scholar, responded with Joseph Smith's statement that "a prophet was a prophet only when he was acting as such," and that purchasing historical materials is a business activity rather than a prophetic undertaking. It is also asserted that the LDS Church's leaders do not claim infallibility and that the church's efforts to obtain and archive historically significant material extend to works even by anti-Mormon authors.

Hofmann was struggling under massive debt and falling behind on delivering on deals that he had made. In 1985, when he learned that the pedigree of the salamander letter was under widespread suspicion, he produced and placed a number of bombs. They were detonated with a mercury switch, but without a safety switch. Two people were killed: Christensen at his office, the main target; and Kathleen Sheets at her home. That bomb was intended as a diversion, to draw off investigators by causing them to focus on unrelated business dealings between Christensen and Sheets's husband. Hofmann himself was subsequently injured when a third bomb went off prematurely in his car. That bomb exploded in a way that most of the blast did not hit Hofmann.

The police investigated these bombings, and during a search of Hofmann's home found a studio in the basement where he could create counterfeited documents as well as a semi-automatic carbine which had been converted to full automatic fire. Many of the documents Hofmann sold or donated were proven to be forgeries by a new forensic technique developed by the Federal Bureau of Investigation, chiefly to detect his forgeries.

The Salt Lake City Police Department used Utah State special agent and forensic examiner George Throckmorton and Arizona document examiner William Flynn to examine a poem supposedly written by Harris and placed in his old Book of Common Prayer and determined it had actually been created by Hofmann. Hofmann used the poem to authenticate the writing in the salamander letter. Although this was enough proof by itself that the letter was a forgery, Throckmorton and Flynn bolstered their case by getting in touch with Frances Magee, the widow of a descendant of Martin Harris. Magee's family had owned the book for many years, and Magee told investigators that she'd never seen the poem before. She suspected someone had planted it there after she sold the book. Hofmann ultimately pleaded guilty to his forgeries and murders and was sentenced to life in prison.

Church leaders, especially First Presidency member Gordon B. Hinckley, continued to field criticism for some time for "being duped" and being "unable to discern the evil intentions of a man like Hofmann". Hinckley later noted: "I accepted him to come into my office on a basis of trust … I frankly admit that Hofmann tricked us. He also tricked experts from New York to Utah, however .... I am not ashamed to admit that we were victimized. It is not the first time the Church has found itself in such a position. Joseph Smith was victimized again and again. The Savior was victimized. I am sorry to say that sometimes it happens."

Following the Hofmann trial, in a speech at Brigham Young University titled "Recent Events Involving Church History and Forged Documents", Dallin H. Oaks addressed media critiques of the church, saying:

I was saddened but not surprised that the news coverage of the truth about the forgeries and lies of Mark Hofmann was small by comparison with the earlier trumpeting of the claims that his newly discovered documents destroyed faith... In the course of this episode, we have seen some of the most sustained and intense LDS church-bashing since the turn of the century. In a circumstance where The Church of Jesus Christ of Latter-day Saints could not say much without interfering with the pending criminal investigation and prosecution, the Church and its leaders have been easy marks for assertions and innuendo ranging from charges of complicity in murder to repeated recitals that the Church routinely acquires and suppresses Church history documents in order to deceive its members and the public. In the hands of clever writers and cartoonists, the mythical salamander proved a most effective instrument to pique public interest...

In addition to addressing the media's treatment of the church during this period, Oaks also spoke about other concerns including alleged suppression of documents, Hofmann's access to church officials, actual amounts paid for documents, and reminders of the many cautions Church leaders gave as to the documents' authenticity prior to Hofmann's arrest.

In addressing why Hofmann's lies were not detected by church leaders, Oaks said:

In order to perform their personal ministries, Church leaders cannot be suspicious and questioning of each of the hundreds of people they meet each year. Ministers of the gospel function best in an atmosphere of trust and love. In that kind of atmosphere, they fail to detect a few deceivers, but that is the price they pay to increase their effectiveness in counseling, comforting, and blessing the hundreds of honest and sincere people they see. It is better for a Church leader to be occasionally disappointed than to be constantly suspicious.

== Lasting effects ==
More than twenty years later, effects of the letter still lingered. The letter was referenced in research by both Mormons and critics of Mormonism alike. Resulting publications that include conclusions based on the presumption that the letter was authentic are still available and may influence the opinions of those seeking information on "deep Mormon doctrine" or evidence to support a naturalistic or magical historical view of Mormonism or Joseph Smith.

Grant H. Palmer, author of the book An Insider's View of Mormon Origins, stated that his work was influenced in part by his original acceptance of the salamander letter as being valid and supportive of his view. Palmer stated that the "salamander letter" caused him to explore Joseph Smith's "mystical mindset".

The salamander letter also influenced the content of the film The God Makers II, an alleged exposé of Mormonism. The film suggests that Joseph Smith was required to dig up his brother Alvin's body and bring a part of it with him to the hill Cumorah in order to obtain the golden plates from which the Book of Mormon was said to be translated. Jerald and Sandra Tanner asserted that the only known source of such a requirement would have been the salamander letter. However, this requirement appears in the "Reminiscences" of Joseph Knight, Sr., which was probably the original source.

== See also ==
- Literary forgery
- Salamander (legendary creature)
- The Magus (book)
- Treasure guardians in folklore
