= Evelyn Roxburgh =

Scottish electrical engineer

- Born: Mary Evelyn Roxburgh; 10 October 1896; Edinburgh, Scotland
- Died: 24 April 1973 (aged 76); Long Wittenham, England
- Burial place: St. Mary's churchyard, Long Wittenham
- Other name: Evi Roxburgh
- Education: Heriot-Watt College
- Occupation: Electrical engineer
- Known for: First Scottish female electrical engineer

Mary Evelyn Roxburgh (10 October 1896 – 24 April 1973) is believed to have been the first woman electrical engineer in Scotland and government factory inspector in England.

== Life ==
Evi Roxburgh was born into a family of lawyers in Edinburgh, Scotland. She enrolled in Edinburgh's Heriot-Watt College (now Heriot-Watt University), graduating with her diploma in electrical engineering in 1923. It is widely believed that she was the first woman to qualify in electrical engineering because "the only other women studying engineering in Scotland seem to have been doing civil engineering."

=== Work ===
After graduation, she got a job working in the electrical switchgear department of Metropolitan Vickers. At the time Metro-Vicks was one of the biggest engineering companies in the country and known as "the foremost employer of female engineers in the interwar period when such work was extremely difficult to find for women, regardless of their experience or qualifications." She joined the Women's Engineering Society before 1924.

Later, she left Metro-Vicks for British Thomson-Houston, known primarily for its electrical systems and steam turbines, and located in the Midlands region.

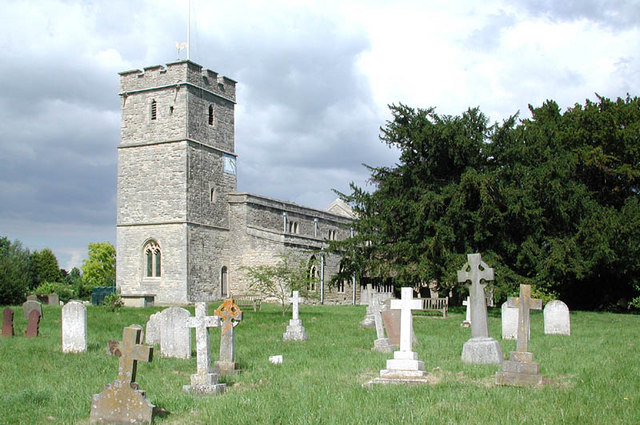
Church of England parish church of St Mary, Long Wittenham, Oxfordshire (formerly Berkshire).

In 1928, Roxburgh was appointed to a government agency to become HM Inspector of Factories, responsible for health and safety inspections.

In a major career change, she left engineering to take the required training to be a radiographer, and rose to become the head radiographer a hospital in Surrey. There, "one eminent consultant radiologist was known to remark that he had rarely seen radiographs of a greater diagnostic value then those taken by Miss Roxburgh." Her engineering training prepared her for the job of manipulating radiography equipment.

=== Retirement ===
In 1950, her father died, leaving both sisters well off financially and enabling them to retire together to the village of Long Wittenham in Oxfordshire near the River Thames.

Evi Roxburgh died 24 April 1973. She is buried with her sister in the local village churchyard of St. Mary's.
