= Lisa Westcott Wilkins =

Archaeologist

Lisa Westcott Wilkins FSA MCIfA
- Title: Founder and co-CEO of DigVentures

Academic background
- Education: Ithaca College; University College London

Academic work
- Discipline: Archaeology
- Institutions: DigVentures

Lisa Westcott Wilkins FSA MCIfA is an archaeologist and Founder and co-CEO of DigVentures. She was made a Clore Fellow in 2010 and elected as a fellow of the Society of Antiquaries of London in 2020. She was appointed an Ashoka Fellow in April 2024.

== Education ==
Westcott Wilkins undertook her undergraduate degree in Communications at Ithaca College, and later completed an MA in Archaeology at University College London in 2001.

== Career ==
Westcott Wilkins' first job was director of operations at Museum of the Earth at Ithaca (2003-2005), then she worked at the University of Rochester as a Chief Development Officer (2005–2007). She then moved to the UK where she was the Editor of Current Archaeology in 2007 and remained in post until 2010 when she undertook a Clore Fellowship – an arts and culture leadership training programme – where she was the first archaeologist to undertake the programme. As part of this Westcott Wilkins undertook a placement as Project Manager for the Evaluation of the 2012 Cultural Olympiad where she was influenced to develop a public engagement evaluation methodology which later underpinned the work of DigVentures, the company that Westcott Wilkins founded shortly thereafter. Since 2012, Lisa has been the Founder and co-CEO of DigVentures where she has pioneered the use of crowdfunding, crowdsourcing and digital methods to increase access and opportunities for non-specialists to engage in archaeological practice and research.

== Personal life ==
In 2012 when the resident Site Dog of DigVentures, Fergus, was interviewed for the Radio 4 Today Programme. All DigVentures Site Dogs have their own staff profiles on their website and they have pioneered Dog Cams.
