= Brightwell Barrow =

Bronze Age round barrow in Oxfordshire, England

Coordinates: 51.623°N 1.169°W

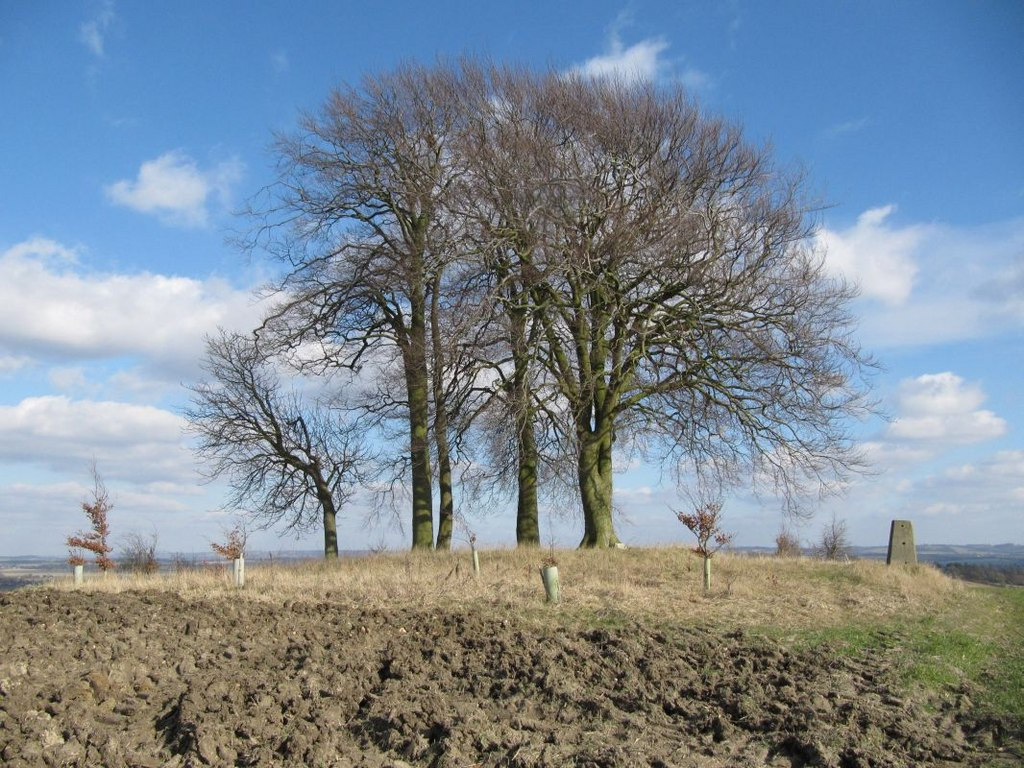
View of Brightwell Barrow from the Wittenham Clumps side

Location of Brightwell Barrow in Oxfordshire

Brightwell Barrow is a Bronze Age round barrow in the civil parish of Brightwell-cum-Sotwell in the English county of Oxfordshire (formerly Berkshire).

It lies just under a kilometre from Wittenham Clumps. Its position is marked by a small clump of trees on its peak. Brightwell Barrow is mentioned in the Domesday Book under the entry for Brightwell-cum-Sotwell.
