= Little Wittenham SSSI =

Site of Special Scientific Interest in Oxfordshire, England

Coordinates: 51.631°N 1.175°W

Little Wittenham
- Site of Special Scientific Interest
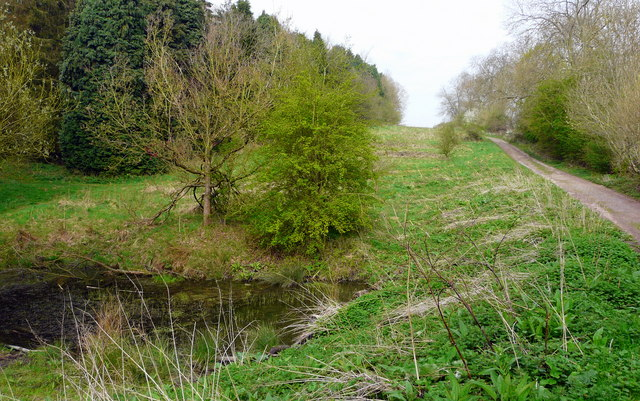
- Location of Little Wittenham.
- Area of search: Oxfordshire
- Grid reference: SU 572 928
- Interest: Biological
- Area: 68.9 hectares (170 acres)
- Notification date: 2000
- Location map: Magic Map

Little Wittenham SSSI is a 68.9-hectare (170-acre) biological Site of Special Scientific Interest north-east of Didcot in Oxfordshire. It is also a Special Area of Conservation.

This site, which is managed by the Earth Trust, consists of woods, grassland, scrub and ponds on the slope of a hill next to the River Thames. Flora include the nationally scarce greater dodder, and there is a rich assemblage of amphibians, including one of the largest populations in the country of the great crested newt, which is a priority species of the Biodiversity action plan.
