= Earth Trust =

UK charitable organization

- Formation: 1967; 59 years ago
- Founder: Sir Martin Wood, Lady Audrey Wood
- Location: Little Wittenham, Oxfordshire
- CEO: Ian Barrett
- Employees: 32
- Volunteers: 276
- Website: earthtrust.org.uk

Founded in 1967, Earth Trust is an environmental charity (not-for-profit organisation) which was originally known as the Northmoor Trust for Countryside Conservation. Earth Trust is the owner and manager of the largest freely accessible natural green space landscape in Oxfordshire - Wittenham Clumps: 500 hectares of woodland, farmland, wildflower meadows and wetlands. Earth Trust also care for a growing number of smaller community reserves - special places for both nature and people within urban areas and towns. These places receive 200,000+ visits each year. The organisation manages and green spaces and also operates a working farm.

== Background ==
The organisation was established by the British engineer Sir Martin Wood to promote environmental conservation through land management, education, and land science. It is a registered charity under English law.

Its origins were as the Northmoor Trust for Countryside Conservation, founded in 1967. Little Wittenham Wood was acquired in 1982, followed by Wittenham Clumps in 1984, and College Farm in 1993. Having obtained this land, in 2002 the formal planning process was commenced to convert the disused buildings known as Hill Farm into offices for the Northmoor Trust, which now form the Earth Trust Centre.

In 2000, the organisation took on the management of three community meadows: Wallingford Castle Meadows and Riverside Meadows in Wallingford, and Mowbray Fields in Didcot, then additionally Thrupp Lake at Radley in 2009.

In 2010, five hundred acres of farmland adjacent to Little Wittenham Wood and the River Thames were acquired and subsequently transformed into wetlands as the "River of Life" project. This was later followed by a similar project near Dorchester on Thames commenced in 2019.

In 2011, the organisation was rebranded as Earth Trust.

Further management contracts were established for Abbey Fishponds in Abingdon-on-Thames (2014), Tuckmill Meadows (near Shrivenham) and Besselsleigh Wood, both in 2024.

Earth Trust coordinated with Enterprise Oxfordshire to construct the Earth Lab building, which was completed in 2021 and received £1.49m in funding from the UK's Local Growth Fund. and later with the commencement of the "Gateway to Nature" Project.

From 1983 onwards, the group has maintained a volunteer program in a broad range of its activities, including land management, conservation, education, administration, engagement of young people, events and visitor support. This was recognised in 2016 through receipt of the Queen's Award for Voluntary Service.

Along with their Farm Step tenants, Earth Trust are one of Oxfordshire's mid-sized producers of legumes, grains and wildflowers, beef, lamb and honey. They have 530 hectares of mixed use farmland and encourages and supports the production, distribution and consumption of healthy and local food.

== Properties ==
=== Little Wittenham ===
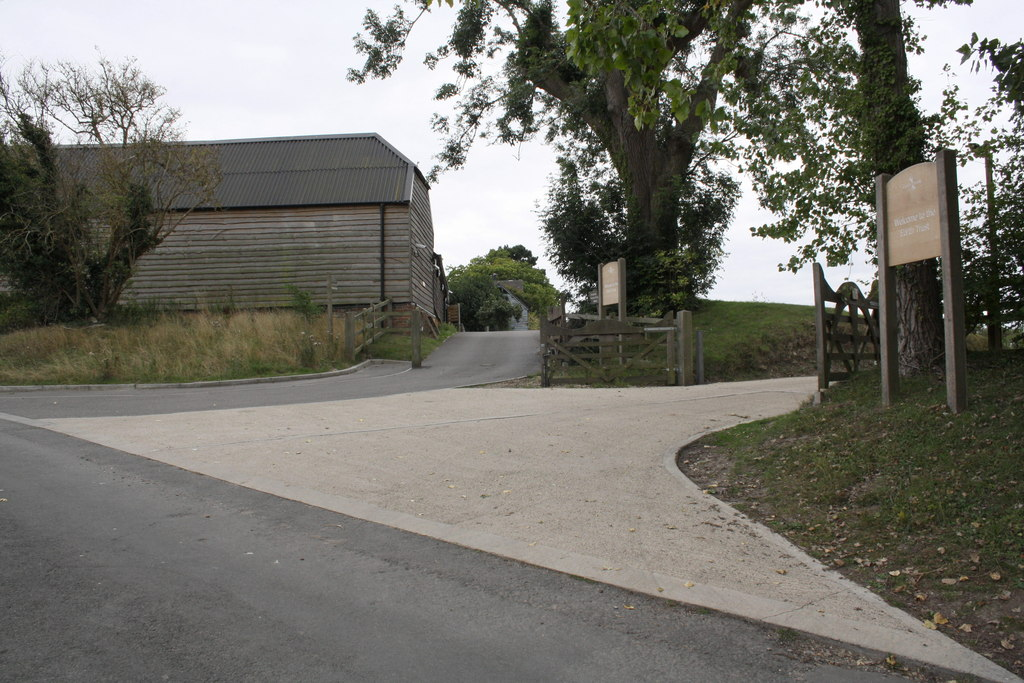
Entrance to Earth Trust Centre

- Earth Trust Centre – Located at the base of the Wittenham Clumps, the Earth Trust Centre comprises the office, Earth Lab learning centre and Fison Barn, which is hired out for weddings, parties and corporate events.
- Earth Lab - Used as the learning environment, Earth Lab was constructed with a timber frame structure and a wildflower roof on Wittenham Clumps. The facility has a potential annual capacity of 10,000 and provides a range of spaces for corporate events. Earth Lab features an atrium space, classrooms and a covered outdoor meeting space.

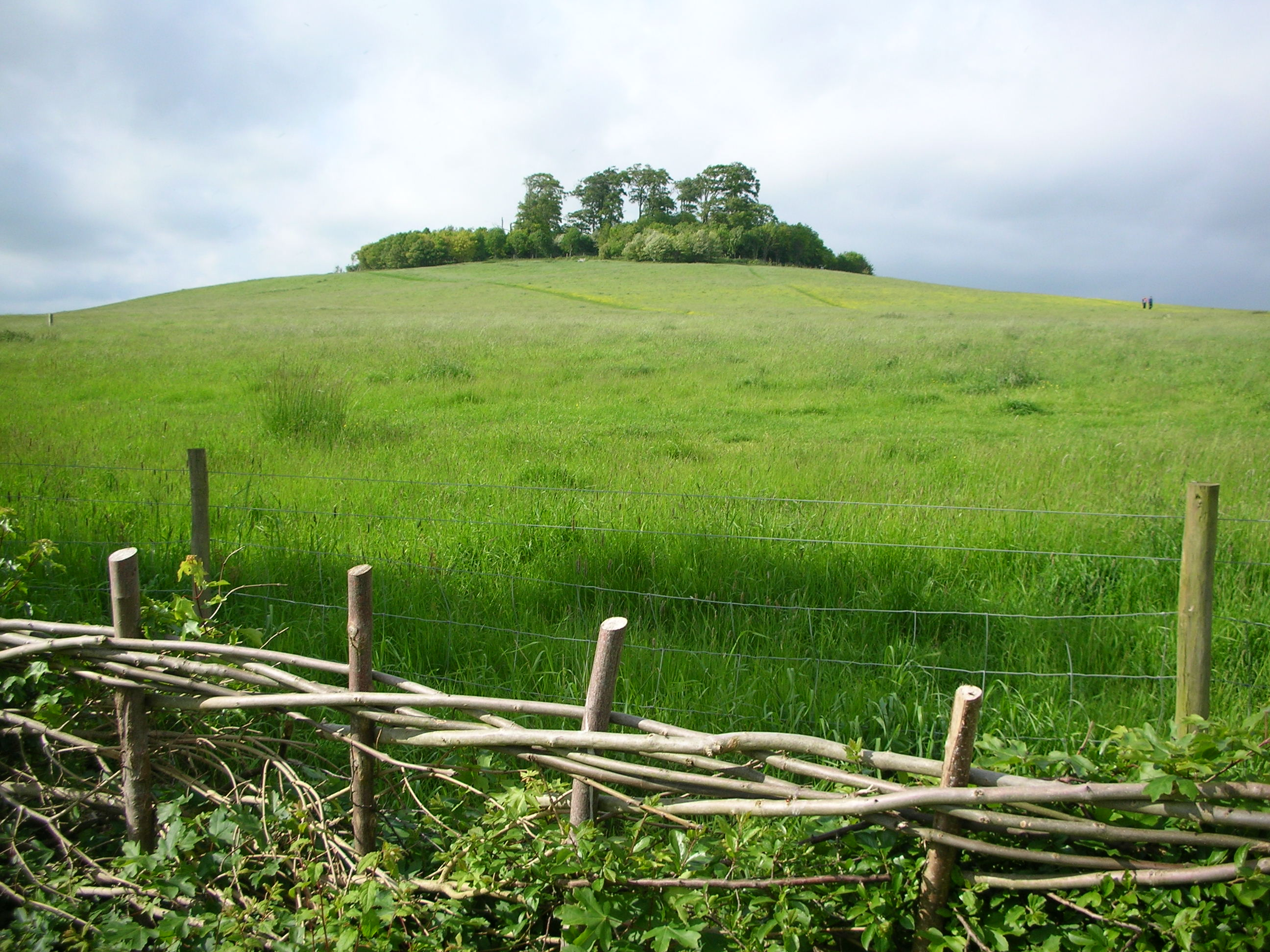
Round Hill at Wittenham Clumps.

- Wittenham Clumps – The two hilltops of Castle Hill and Round Hill are known to be the two oldest planted hilltop beeches in England, dating back over 300 years. Castle Hill is protected at a national level as a Scheduled Monument with significant archaeological features dating from the Late Bronze Age to the Iron Age (1000–100 BC). Earth Trust has associated with DigVentures in Iron Age and Roman period excavations lower on the flank of The Clumps, adjacent to Earth Trust Centre.
- Little Wittenham Wood – Located in the area of North Wessex Downs, Little Wittenham Wood is a Site of Special Scientific Interest (SSSI) due to the large breeding population of Great Crested newts that live in the ponds and a Special Area of Conservation (SAC).
- Broad Arboretum – Planted in 1998, the Broad Arboretum features every species of fauna native to Oxfordshire along with recent introductions such as walnut, sycamore and chestnut.
- Neptune Wood – Neptune Wood was planted to honour the 200th anniversary of the Battle of Trafalgar. Thousands of oak trees were planted in this area to replace some of the trees that were used to build the ships. Specifically, Lord Nelson's flagship was made out of approximately 5,000 oak trees, while the 27-ship fleet had used over 50,000 trees.
- Paradise Wood – Paradise Wood is a national research woodland acquired by The Northmoor Trust in 1991. It is the largest collection of hardwood timber trails in the United Kingdom, comprising 136 acres of land and over 60,000 trees.
- River of Life – In 2010 Earth Trust acquired 35 hectares of land on the south bank of the River Thames between Shillingford and Dorchester-on-Thames. In partnership with the Environment Agency landscaping work was undertaken with the aim of restoring a wetland habitat. In 2014 this project was the joint winner of the Best Practice Award for Practical Nature Conservation at the Chartered Institute of Ecology and Environmental Management (CIEEM) Awards.
- River of Life 2 – In 2021, a further 4.6 hectares in 3 locations by the River Thames and River Thame were transformed in a similar manner to that of the original River of Life project.

=== Wallingford ===
- Wallingford Castle Meadows - Now in ruins, Earth Trust manage the site on behalf of South Oxfordshire District Council. In 2022 Wallingford Castle Meadows was awarded its 15th Green Flag Award and Green Heritage Site accreditation for the 9th year in a row.
- Riverside Meadows - Riverside land located alongside the Thames River in Wallingford. It is considered to be a rare and threatened habitat and Earth Trust is working to restore the wildflower meadows. Riverside Meadows can be enjoyed during the summer months when the meadows are full of oxeye daisy, common knapweed and bird's-foot trefoil. Earth Trust manage the site on behalf of South Oxfordshire District Council.

=== Other ===
- Mowbray Fields – Earth Trust manage this local nature reserve in Didcot on behalf of South Oxfordshire District Council. It is home to the common spotted and southern marsh orchids.
- Thrupp Lake – Thrupp Lake, part of the Radley Lake complex, is located in the village of Radley on the edge of Abingdon and is a man-made lake owned by RWE npower and managed by Earth Trust. Radley Lakes were the subject of a community campaign to save them from being filled in (2005-8). In 2015 Earth Trust was awarded the management contract for some of the surrounding former lakes.
- Abbey Fishponds – Earth Trust took over the management of this community nature reserve in Abingdon in July 2014.The site is also known as Daisy Bank. Earth Trust manage the site on behalf of Vale of White Horse District Council. The reserve is around 7ha and completely enclosed by housing.
- Besselsleigh Wood – In 2024, Earth Trust took over the management of this community woodland on behalf of Vale of White Horse District Council. The reserve, situated between the villages of Besselsleigh and Appleton, is around 10 hectares in size.
- Tuckmill Meadows – In 2024, Earth Trust took over the management of this community reserve on behalf of Vale of White Horse District Council. This Site of Special Scientific Interest (SSSI), situated between the villages of Shrivenham and Watchfield, is around 15 acres in size and combines both floodplain meadow and woodland.

== Earth Trust events ==
Earth Trust host many events throughout the year. The majority are held at their flagship site in Little Wittenham with a small number taking place on the nearby community nature reserves that the charity manages. The annual programme of events includes countryside management courses, taster workshops and family festivals. A Spring Festival has superseded the earlier Lambing Weekends in spring, which were attended by over 8,000 people in 2016.

The Children's Food Festival was held in 2007 and in 2009 in Oxfordshire and was fronted by patrons Raymond Blanc and Sophie Grigson. The 2007 event was attended by over 16,000 people. In 2009, the exhibitions included an animation titled "Eat a Rainbow", a photo installation showcasing foods consumed by people across 16 countries titled "What the World Eats", and a 40-foot inflatable pig.

== See also ==
- The Poem Tree at Wittenham Clumps, carved by Joseph Tubb.
