= The Poem Tree =

Tree in Oxfordshire, England

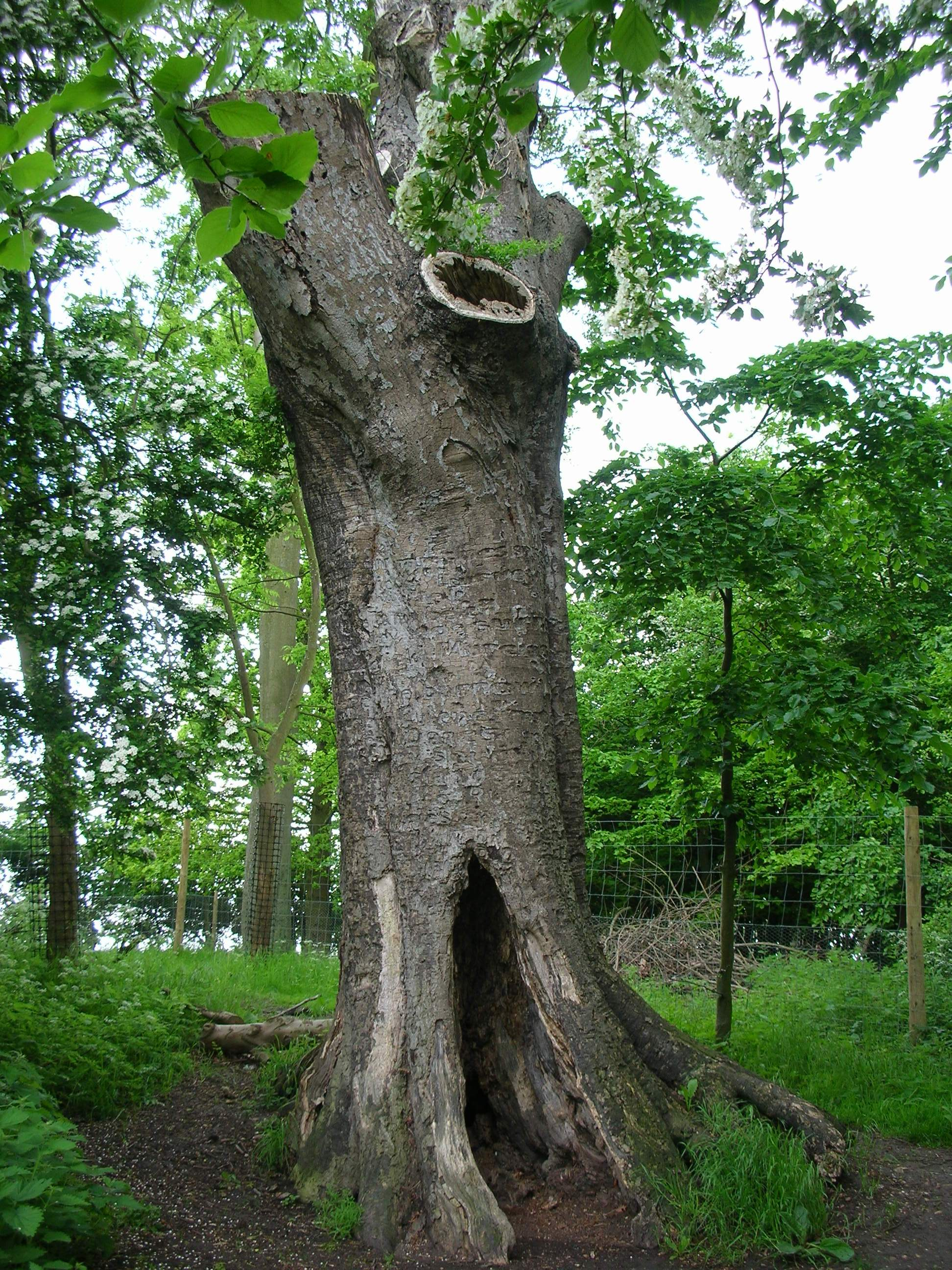
- Artist: Joseph Tubb
- Year: 1844/45
- Type: Beech tree carving
- Location: Wittenham Clumps; Oxfordshire, UK; 51°37′41.66″N 1°10′42.89″W
- Owner: Earth Trust

The Poem Tree was a beech tree with a poem carved into it by Joseph Tubb, located on Castle Hill at Wittenham Clumps in Oxfordshire, England. The tree was believed to be around 300 years old, with Tubb's poem being carved in the 1840s. The tree died in the 1990s and rotted completely while standing, before collapsing during a period of inclement weather in July 2012.

A stone, including a transcription and rubbing of the poem, was erected close to the tree in 1994, to commemorate the 150th anniversary of the carving.

== Carving ==
Tubb carved the 20-line poem into the tree over two weeks in the summer. Taking a ladder and a tent with him, but regularly forgetting to bring the original copy of the poem, he carved it from memory. Sources vary as to whether the carving took place in 1844 or between 1844 and 1845.

== Poem ==
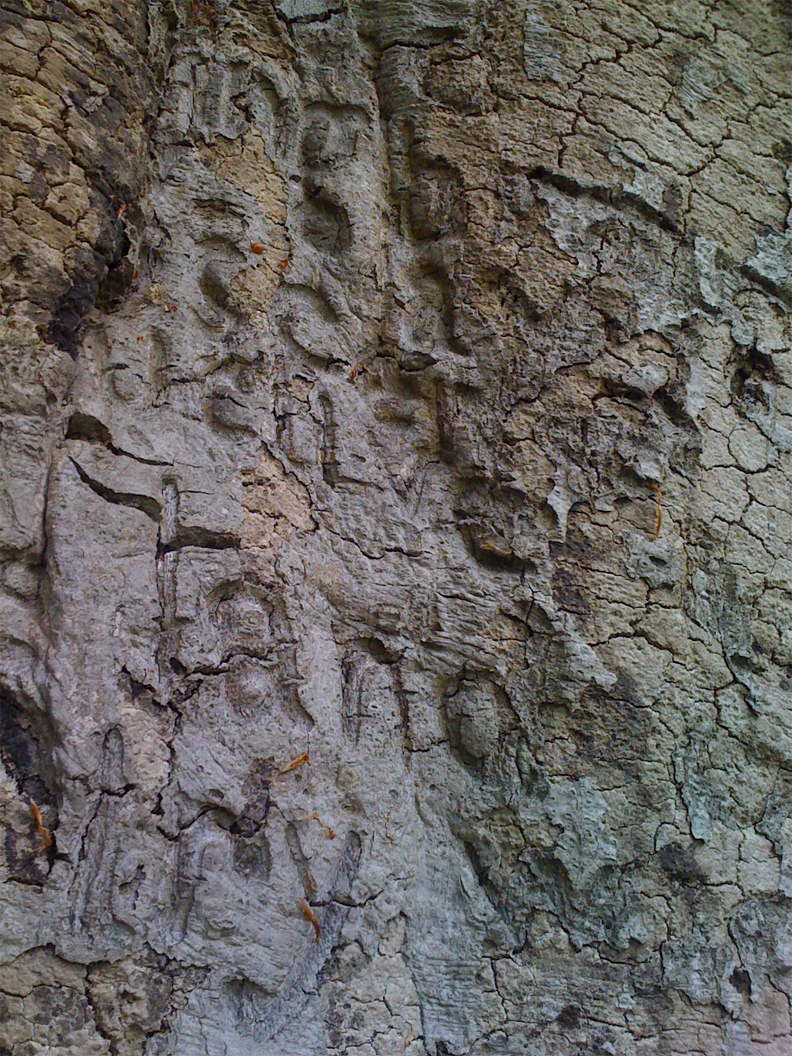
A close-up of the carving. The word "land" (The various changes that the land befell) can be seen, below which the end of the word "country" (Where the low bank the country wide surrounds) is legible.

As up the hill with labr'ing steps we tread
Where the twin Clumps their sheltering branches spread
The summit gain'd at ease reclining lay
And all around the wide spread scene survey
Point out each object and instructive tell
The various changes that the land befell
Where the low bank the country wide surrounds
That ancient earthwork form'd old Mercia's bounds
In misty distance see the barrow heave
There lies forgotten lonely Cwichelm's grave.

Around this hill the ruthless Danes intrenched
And these fair plains with gory slaughter drench'd
While at our feet where stands that stately tower
In days gone by up rose the Roman power
And yonder, there where Thames smooth waters glide
In later days appeared monastic pride.
Within that field where lies the grazing herd
Huge walls were found, some coffins disinter'd
Such is the course of time, the wreck which fate
And awful doom award the earthly great.

== Inspiration and interpretation ==
The poem was inspired by Tubb's fondness of the surrounding landscape, which is described in the first half of the first stanza. It has been suggested that the poem, which is also a summary of the location's history, was an example of Tubb's repressed creativity—his ambition was to be a wood carver, but he was pressured into being a maltster through family tradition. The "ancient earthwork" at "Mercia's bounds" may be Grim's Ditch or The Ridgeway (the latter is formed by part of Grim's Ditch). At the time of Alfred the Great, the border between Mercia and Wessex ran roughly in a line from east to west through the region. The mention of Cwichelm's (or Culchelm's) grave refers to Scutchamer Knob, a barrow on The Ridgeway near Grim's Ditch, approximately 8.5 miles (13.7 km) south-west of the Poem Tree. The barrow was originally known as Cwichelmeshlaew or Cwichelm's Barrow, and is historically recorded as the site at which Cwichelm of Wessex was killed by Edwin of Northumbria in 636. Tubb's assertion that the barrow could be seen in the misty distance is plausible; the archaeologist Tim Allen suggests that on a clear day the Berkshire Downs can be viewed from the hills and vice versa.

The "smooth waters" of the River Thames refers to the river running through Dorchester on Thames, where the "monastic pride" of the Augustinian Dorchester Abbey is mentioned.

The disinterred coffins may refer to an 18th-century discovery of two skeletons at the summit of Round Hill. The slopes of the two hills were used for grazing, where excavations have revealed remains of buildings (including a possible Roman villa).

== Legacy ==
In 1965, British geographer Henry Osmaston took a rubbing of the poem before it became largely illegible.

In the 1980s, the health of the tree began to decline and it died in the early 1990s. By the time of its collapse in 2012, the poem had become difficult to read, the few legible letters having been distorted with the tree's growth.

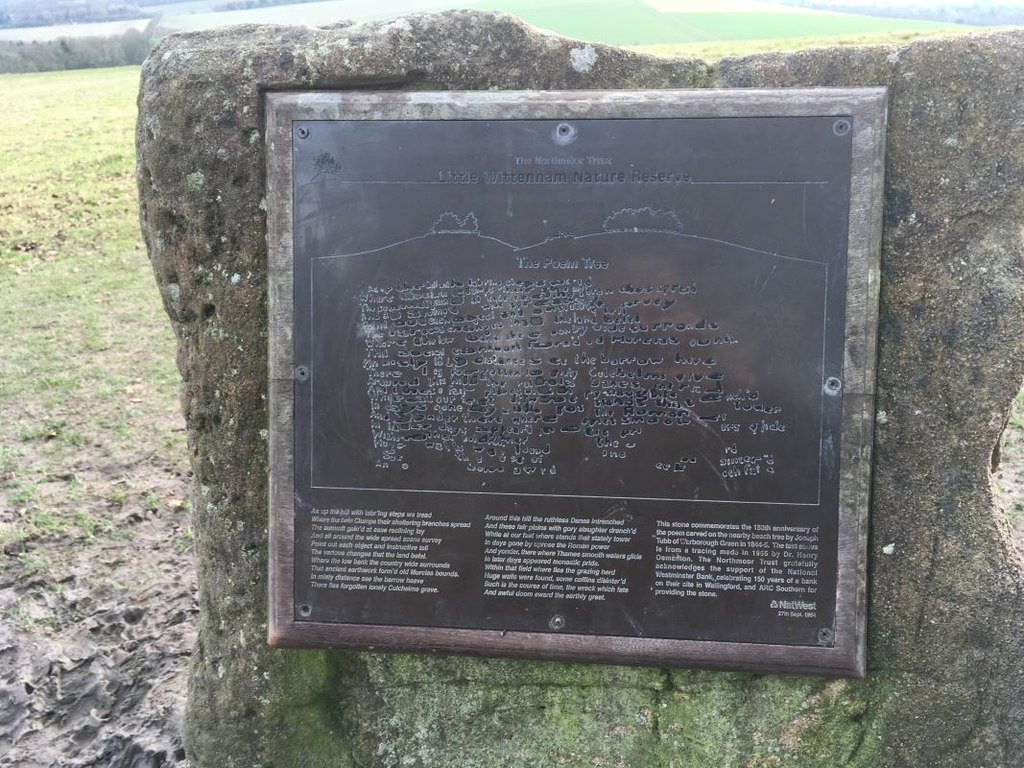
Commemorative plaque

In 1994, a plaque and stone were placed nearby to commemorate 150 years since the carving. The plaque, which features a copy of Osmaston's 1965 tracing, is fixed to a large Sarsen stone.

Following its collapse, a crane was used to help make the tree safe but the much decayed trunk disintegrated. A few days later, a tribute of flowers was left anonymously on the shattered trunk. The remains of the tree have been left in situ to form a natural habitat.
