= Treasure guardians in folklore =

The treasure guardian is a recurring motif in folklore of a being that guards a treasure. Typically, the hero must overcome the guardian in order to obtain the treasure. In some cases the treasure guardians are non-human beings, although one subtype, known as "treasure ghosts", were deceased humans who had been murdered and buried with the treasure to protect it. Animals are often shown as treasure guardians—an index of folklore chronicles stories of snakes, crows, ravens, cocks, swans, and night-birds as treasure guardians. In some stories, the treasure is guarded by "the Devil himself".

== In folklore ==
- Jinn, an Islamic legendary creature sometimes depicted as a treasure guardian
- Gnome, a European legendary creature sometimes depicted as a treasure guardian
- Leprechaun, a treasure guardian from Irish folklore
- Dragon, a creature often portrayed as hoarding a treasure
- Salamander, a legendary creature often described as a lizard in shape (even looking like a common salamander), but usually with an affinity for fire
- Spriggan, Cornish guardian of fairy treasure, said to be the ghosts of giants that can swell to enormous sizes.

== In popular culture ==
- Indiana Jones and the Last Crusade features a crusader knight who guards the Holy Grail.
- Works by Tolkien feature Smaug and Chrysophylax, both treasure-guarding dragons.
- The Dragons of Earthsea in Ursula K. Le Guin's A Wizard of Earthsea hoard treasure.

== See also ==
- Salamander letter
- Apotropaic magic
  - Curse of the pharaohs
  - Curse tablet
- Gargoyle and Grotesque (architecture)
