= Gabriel Hemery =

British forest scientist, author, and photographer

Gabriel Eric Hemery
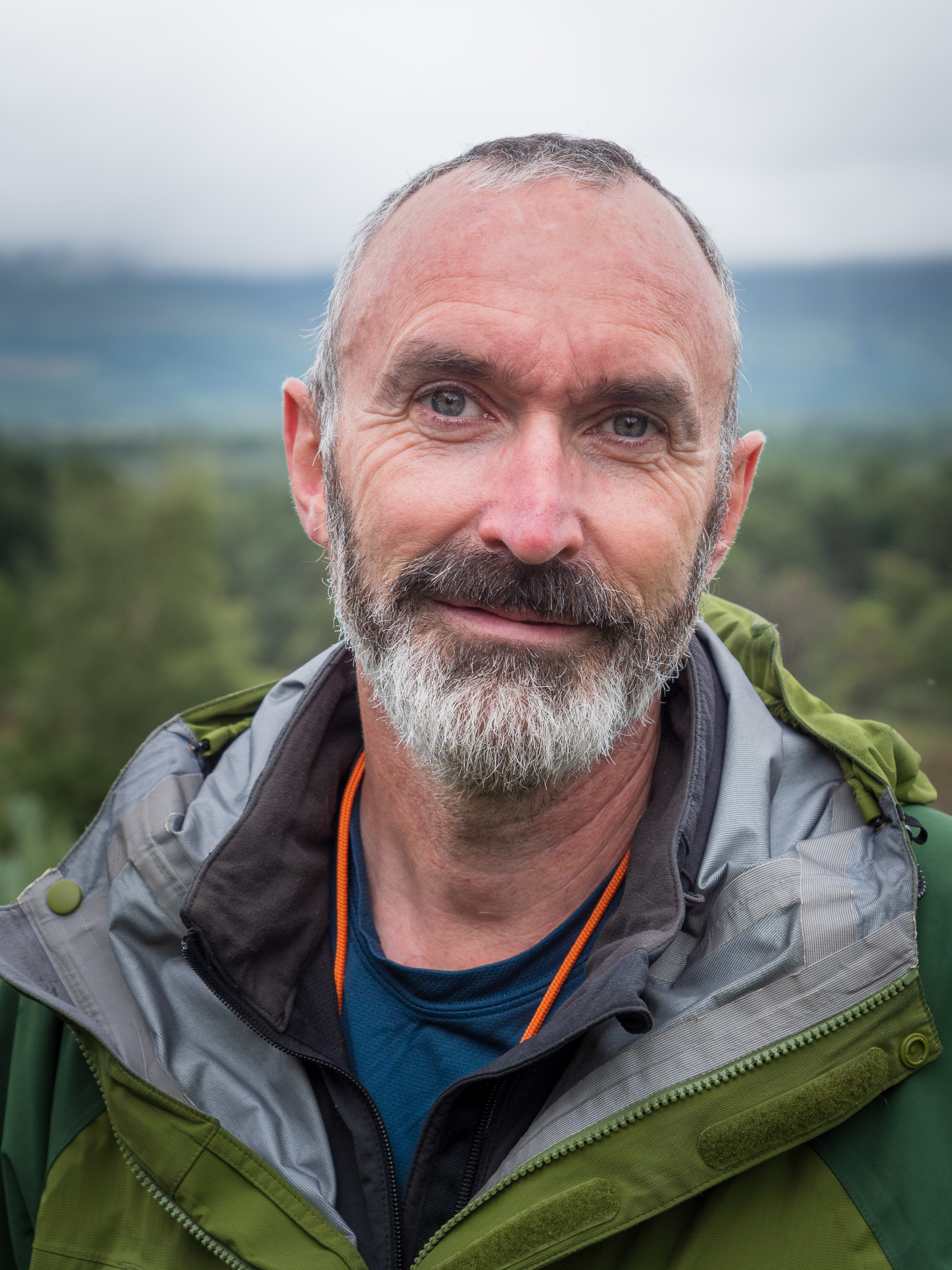
- Dr Gabriel Hemery
- Born: December 13, 1968 (age 57); United Kingdom
- Citizenship: British
- Education: University of Oxford (DPhil)
- Notable work: The New Sylva (2014); Green Gold (2019); The Forest Guide series (2023–2026)
- Scientific career
- Fields: Forestry, silviculture (silvology), nature writing
- Workplaces: Sylva Foundation, Botanical Society of Britain and Ireland, Northmoor Trust
- Thesis: Walnut silviculture in the UK (2001)
- Website: gabrielhemery.com

Gabriel Eric Hemery CEnv FICFor (born 13 December 1968) is an English forest scientist (silvologist), author, and tree photographer. He is best known as the co-founder and Chief Executive of the Sylva Foundation, a national forestry charity, and for his extensive nature writing, fiction, and poetry focused on wood culture and environmentalism.

== Education and forestry research ==
Hemery attended the University of Wales Aberystwyth in the early 1990s, graduating with a Bachelor of Science (BSc) in physical geography. He subsequently moved into forestry and completed his DPhil at the Department of Plant Sciences, University of Oxford in 2001. His doctoral thesis focused on the genetic improvement and silviculture of walnut (Juglans regia) in the United Kingdom. As part of his research, he undertook an expedition to the walnut fruit forests of Kyrgyzstan to collect thousands of wild seeds for establishing long-term comparative field trials back in Britain.

In the mid-1990s, Hemery initiated pioneering research into agroforestry, specifically analyzing the ecological and economic dynamics of combining free-range broiler chicken production with newly established hardwood woodlands. He was also a founding member of the British and Irish Hardwoods Improvement Programme (BIHIP), establishing nationwide forestry field trials aimed at improving the quality and resilience of British broadleaf timber trees.

== Career and conservation leadership ==
Hemery began his professional career as Director of Land Operations for the Northmoor Trust (now the Earth Trust) in Oxfordshire. While there, he designed and established Paradise Wood, a living genetic archive and premier trials ground for British hardwood forestry research.

In March 2005, he was appointed as the first Director of Development for the Botanical Society of Britain and Ireland (BSBI), operating out of Oxford to steer the society's strategic expansions and botanical data infrastructures. In 2006, he founded the independent think-tank Forestry Horizons.

In 2009, Hemery co-founded the Sylva Foundation alongside physicist and philanthropist Sir Martin Wood. Under Hemery's stewardship as Chief Executive, the charity launched key national initiatives, including myForest (a digital woodland management platform) and the Sylva Wood Centre, an incubator designed to support wood-focused businesses and traditional artisans.

During the 2011–2012 public forest estate controversy in England, Hemery was an active public campaigner against privatization plans. In 2011, he co-founded the high-profile pressure group and environmental watchdog alliance Our Forests alongside notable figures Jonathon Porritt and Tony Juniper, championing public forest access and long-term ecosystem security.

== Literary career ==
Hemery's writing ranges from formal natural history to creative fiction and poetry.

His prominent non-fiction reference work, The New Sylva (2014), co-authored with artist Sarah Simblet and published by Bloomsbury, won critical acclaim for reinterpreting John Evelyn's 1664 work Sylva, or A Discourse of Forest-Trees for the 21st century. Between 2023 and 2026, he authored The Forest Guide triptych, a regional guidebook series mapping the publicly accessible woodlands of Scotland, Wales, and England.

His creative writing incorporates deep ecological and botanical themes. His debut biographical novel, Green Gold (2019), tells the story of Victorian plant hunter John Jeffrey's 1850s expedition to North America. Hemery has also published standalone short story collections, a poetry anthology, and contributed to prominent nature anthologies, including Arboreal (2016) and Everyman's Library's Stories of Trees, Woods and the Forest (2021).

== Photography ==
Alongside his text, Hemery works as a tree photographer, utilizing his subject and landscape imagery to illustrate his natural history works. His photography is featured throughout The Forest Guide triptych (2023–2026) to document public woodlands across Britain, and provides the visual identification material for the RSPB Trees of the British Isles (2026) field guide.

In 2025, his landscape photograph titled Good Morning—capturing the rising sun over the Wittenhams area in South Oxfordshire—was selected through a competitive peer-review process among 1,000 members for the Royal Photographic Society (RPS) Landscape Group Members' Outdoor Exhibition. The work was featured as a primary display piece on a national touring exhibition across public venues in the United Kingdom, including Southwark Cathedral and Chester Cathedral, spanning 2025 and 2026.

== Bibliography ==
=== Non-fiction ===
- The New Sylva: A Discourse of Forest and Orchard Trees for the Twenty-First Century (with Sarah Simblet) (Bloomsbury, 2014) ISBN 978-1408835449
- The Forest Guide: Scotland (Bloomsbury Wildlife, 2023) ISBN 978-1472994622
- The Tree Almanac 2024 (Robinson, 2023) ISBN 978-1472148490
- The Tree Almanac 2025 (Robinson, 2024) ISBN 978-1472149398
- The Forest Guide: Wales (Bloomsbury Wildlife, 2025) ISBN 978-1399409124
- The Forest Guide: England (Bloomsbury Wildlife, 2026 ISBN 978-1399409063
- RSPB Trees of the British Isles (Bloomsbury Wildlife, 2026) ISBN 978-1399422413

=== Fiction and poetry ===
- "Don't Look Back" in Adrian Cooper (ed) – Arboreal: a collection of new woodland writing (Little Toller Books, 2016) ISBN 978-1908213419
- Green Gold: The Epic True Story of Victorian Plant Hunter John Jeffrey (Unbound Publishing, 2019) ISBN 978-1789650235
- Tall Trees Short Stories: Vol. 20 (Wood Wide Works, 2020) ISBN 978-1916336216
- "The Man Who Harvested Trees (and Gifted Life)" in Fiona Stafford (ed) – Stories of Trees, Woods and the Forest (Everyman's Library, 2021) ISBN 978-1841596310
- Tall Trees Short Stories: Vol. 21 (Wood Wide Works, 2021) ISBN 978-1916336230
- The Wolf, The Walnut and the Woodsman (Wood Wide Works, 2022) ISBN 978-1916336254
- Blough: an anthology of tree and nature poems (Wood Wide Works, 2024) ISBN 978-1916333598
