= DigVentures =

Archaeological social enterprise platform

DigVentures Ltd
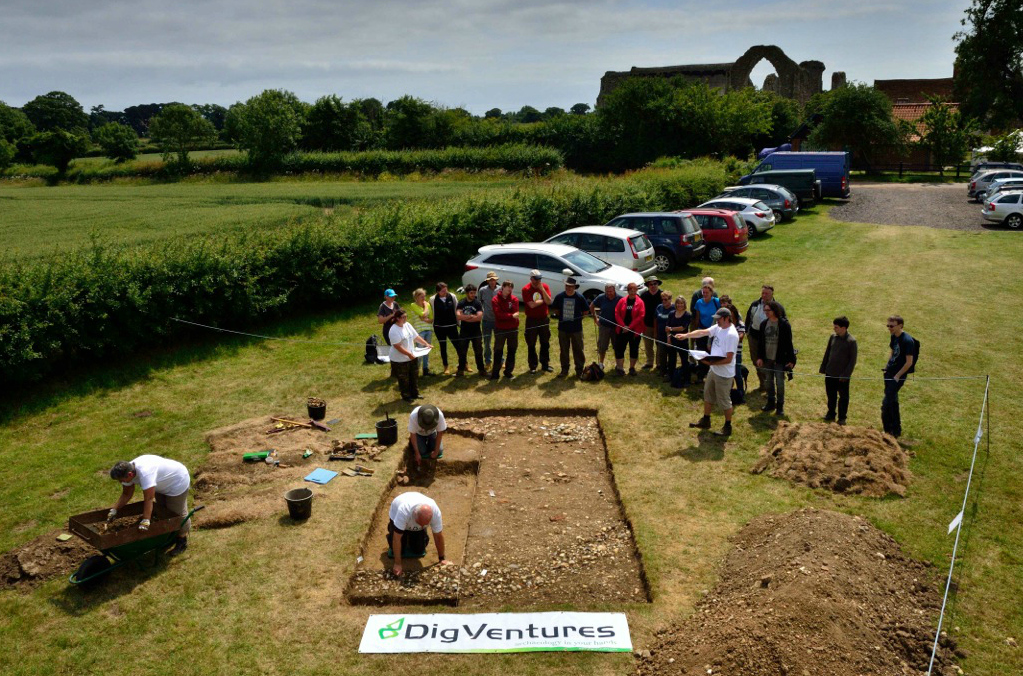
- DigVentures Trench 5 at Leiston Abbey, 2013
- Industry: Heritage/archaeology
- Founded: 2011
- Founder: Lisa Westcott Wilkins
- Headquarters: Registered office: 5 Witham Studios, Hall Street, Barnard Castle, County Durham, DL12 8JB
- Key people: Co-CEO: Lisa Westcott Wilkins; Co-CEO: Brendon Wilkins; Senior Director of Engagement: Maiya Pina-Dacier
- Products: Digital Dig Team; Dirty Weekends
- Number of employees: 15
- Website: www.digventures.com

DigVentures is a social enterprise organising crowdfunded archaeological excavation experiences. It is registered with the Chartered Institute for Archaeologists (CIfA), and is a CIfA Accredited Field School.

== Background ==
Headquartered in Barnard Castle with offices across the UK, DigVentures is a platform that enables civic participation in archaeology and heritage projects. They have pioneered the use of crowdfunding, crowdsourcing and digital methods to increase access and opportunities for real people to purposefully participate in real research.

The organisation was formed in 2011, responding to the challenge of austerity and lack of opportunity in the heritage sector. By adopting a crowdfunding and crowdsourcing approach, DigVentures have sought to address this by using digital and social media to build audiences, increase revenue and find new ways for the public to participate in archaeological fieldwork.

== Crowdfunding model ==
DigVentures projects are coordinated through their proprietary online multicurrency crowdfunding platform designed to connect heritage sector managers and archaeologists (project owners) with a worldwide crowd of interested and actively engaged participants. To date, the team has raised approximately £2m in crowdfunding and matched grant finance. The archive of funded projects is available on the DV website.

== Digital Dig Team ==
In 2014 DigVentures received a grant from the Heritage Lottery Fund to develop its Digital Dig Team. This was described as a ‘Community Management System’ for archaeology projects. It was built onto a cloud-based, open-source software platform enabling researchers to publish data directly from the field using any web-enabled device (such as a smartphone or tablet) into a live relational database. Once recorded the born-digital archive was accessible via open-access on a dedicated website, and published to social profiles of all project participants. Beta tested in the field at Leiston Abbey in 2014, early results demonstrated that the Digital Dig Team system enabled archaeologists to build audiences (through immersive storytelling), generate revenue (through crowdfunding), enable public participation (through crowdsourcing) and improve research by making results available to a networked specialist team in 'real time'. A children's version of this system was also developed, based on a ‘Cyber Dig’ simulated excavation for use in schools or family events.

Records created using Digital Dig Team remain accessible on the company website and hyperlinked in most Post-Excavation Reports produced between 2014 and 2023.

During the COVID-19 pandemic, DigVentures's digs, talks and workshops were postponed, and the online "How to Do Archaeology" course was made freely available.

== Fieldwork ==
=== Flag Fen Lives ===
In 2012 DigVentures ran the world's first crowdfunded excavation, raising £30,000 to enable a three-week excavation at the internationally significant Bronze Age site of Flag Fen, near Peterborough. The site had experienced a 50% decline in visitors since the large-scale English Heritage-funded excavations finished in 1995; the project's remit was to help revitalise the heritage attraction, whilst providing detailed scientific information on the preservation of the waterlogged timbers. The project involved around 250 members of the public from 11 countries, supported by a specialist team including partners from the British Museum, Durham University, Birmingham University, York Archaeological Trust, University College London and English Heritage to assist in the scientific investigations. Of the members of public, 130 individuals received hands-on training in archaeological techniques on site and visitor numbers increased by 29% from the previous year. Francis Pryor, who discovered the site in the 1970s, was supportive of the initiative and wrote afterwards: "happily, it was an experiment that worked: the participants had a good time, and the archaeology was professionally excavated, to a very high standard".

=== Leiston Abbey ===
Leiston Abbey was the first crowdfunding campaign to run on the DigStarter platform in 2013, and raised more than £36,000 over the first two seasons. The project ran for four digging seasons, from 2013 to 2016. Its wider rationale was to breathe new life into Leiston Abbey, providing opportunities for visitors to join in with the excavation, and to integrate the heritage attraction with the artistic and musical life of the onsite music school, Pro Corda, who manage the site for English Heritage. Fieldwork focused on characterising undefined earthworks and settlement evidence in multiple areas of the site, with a programme of remote sensing used to target over twenty small-scale excavation trenches aiming to identify settlement evidence indicated by geophysical anomalies or extant earthworks. Additional work included a photogrammetry survey to produce a metrically accurate 3D digital elevation model of the Abbey Church and a low-level aerial photography survey using kite mounted cameras and UAVs (drones) to assess structural evidence for absent buildings associated with the eastern range.

=== Lindisfarne ===
In 2016, DigVentures and Durham University began a joint programme of community supported and delivered excavations on Lindisfarne. A total of nine consecutive field seasons have unearthed numerous insights for the site. Artefacts of note recovered included a rare board game piece, copper-alloy rings and Anglo-Saxon coins from both Northumbria and Wessex. The discovery of a cemetery led to finding commemorative markers "unique to the 8th and 9th centuries". The group also found evidence of an early medieval building, "which seems to have been constructed on top of an even earlier industrial oven" which was used to make copper or glass.

=== Sudeley Castle ===
Yearly excavations by DigVentures began at Sudeley Castle in 2018, uncovering extensive Tudor gardens to the east of the reconstructed Victorian gardens currently on the site. Through these investigations, evidence of multiple phases of landscaping have been revealed, the earliest of which dated to the middle of the 16th century. This is significant as previously these gardens had been attributed to Giles Brydges, 3rd Baron Chandos and the landscaping efforts in advance of Elizabeth's visit. LiDAR shows extensive areas surrounding the castle grounds which still may contain the evidence of these works, but there appears to have been another phase of work, likely associated with the works done by Thomas Seymour in advance of the arrival of Catherine Parr.

=== Pontefract Castle ===
Recent excavations led by DigVentures in 2019–20 in the castle's drawbridge pit uncovered numerous mason's marks on the structure, as well as lead shot dating to the Civil War.

=== Soulton Hall ===
Mentioned in the Norman Domesday Book, Soulton has housed a manor since late Anglo Saxon times. A "lost castle" rediscovered there in 2021 was the subject of a multi-season archaeological investigation by DigVentures. The five year long programme of fieldwork concluded in June 2024.

=== Caerfai Hillfort (Castell Penpleidiau) ===
Caerfai hillfort is 1.4 kilometres (0.87 mi) from centre of the cathedral city of St Davids. On the headland are ramparts of the Iron Age fort of Castell Penpleidiau. Excavations by DigVentures in partnership with the CHERISH (Climate, Heritage and Environments of Reefs, Islands, and Headlands) project began in 2021 and were the first ever recorded excavations on the site. Two additional crowdfunded field seasons were led by DigVentures to salvage as much archaeological evidence as possible from the narrowing isthmus under active threat of collapse from coastal erosion.

=== Wittenham Clumps ===
DigVentures carried out excavations from 2028 to 2020 at Wittenham Clumps in Oxfordshire in partnership with Earth Trust. They uncovered Iron Age and Roman remains including an Iron Age blacksmith's workshop and the remains of a small Roman dog.

=== Cerney Wick ===
DigVentures carried out investigations at Oak Tree Fields, Cerney Wick, Gloucestershire, where Pleistocene deposits yielded mammoth remains and Palaeolithic artefacts. The results were published in the Journal of Quaternary Science in 2023.

=== Dirty Weekends ===
DigVentures also runs short taster sessions and masterclasses by experts in their respective subjects.

- 2013: River Thames Foreshore, working with the Thames Discovery Programme (2 weekends)
- 2013: As part of the two-week summer dig at Leiston Abbey; classes in geophysics and archaeological photography.
- 2014: As part of the two-week summer dig at Leiston Abbey; classes in post-medieval pottery and archaeological photography.
- 2015: Poulton, near Chester, opportunity to work with The Poulton Research Project on their large multi-period site.
- 2015: As part of the two-week summer dig at Leiston Abbey; classes in post-medieval pottery and archaeological photography.
