= Joseph Tubb (poet) =

British poet

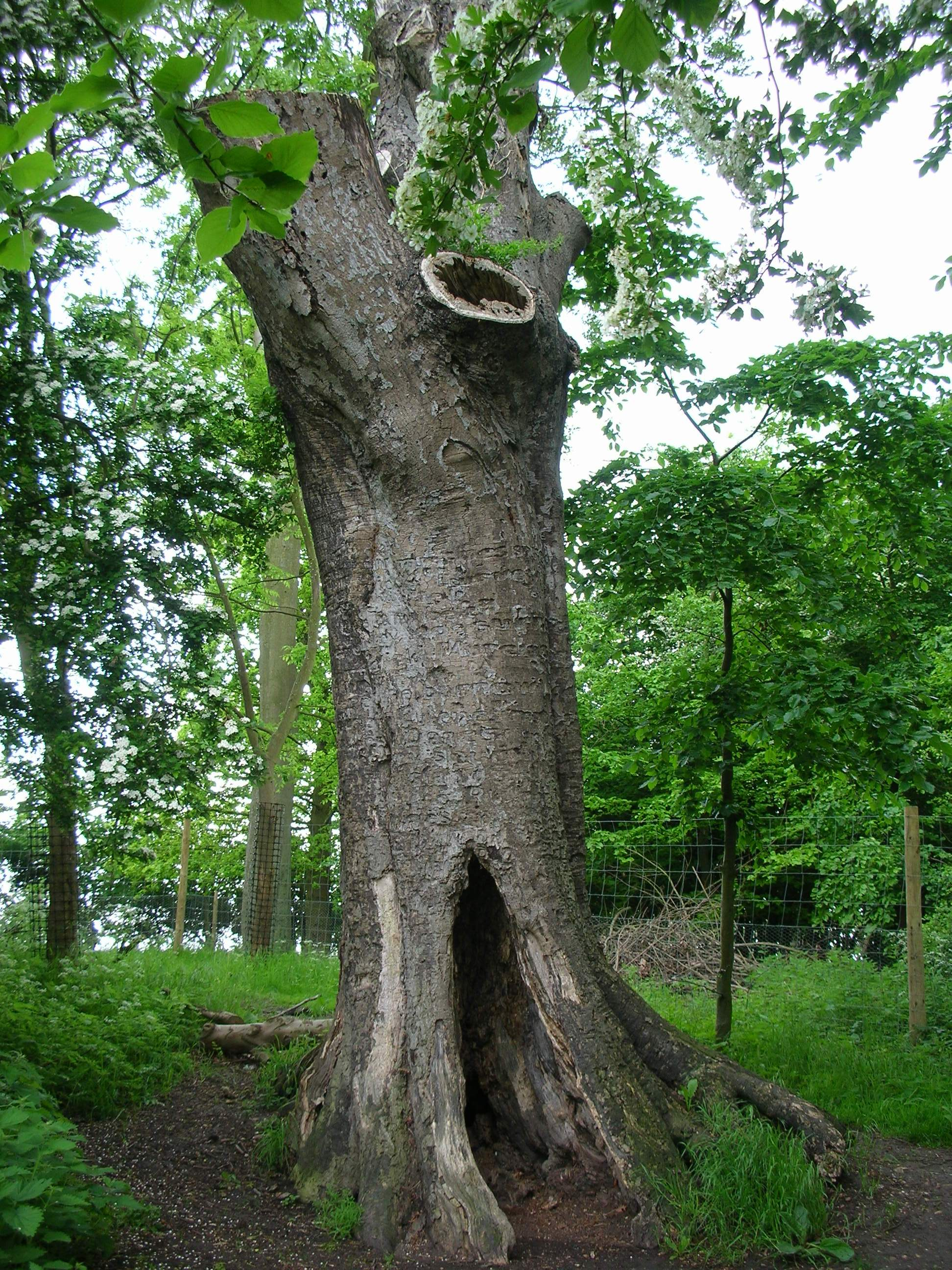
The Poem Tree at Wittenham Clumps, Oxfordshire, carved by Joseph Tubb in 1844–45.

Joseph Tubb (1805–1879) was a maltster from Oxfordshire, England who created the Poem Tree at Wittenham Clumps, which died in the 1990s and finally collapsed in July 2012.

== Biography ==
Tubb lived at Lavender Cottage in Warborough, a village near the town of Dorchester. He wished to become a wood carver, but his father convinced him to become a maltster. He lived a country life as a bachelor.

Joseph Tubb opposed the enclosure of the commons and pulled down fences in rebellion against this. He spent a short time in the Oxford gaol.

Tubb's main legacy was to carve a poem on a large beech tree on the eastern side of Castle Hill at Wittenham Clumps. He took a tent and a ladder to Castle Hill and spent the summers of 1844 and 1845 carving the letters of a 20-line poem. The poem demonstrates Joseph Tubb's passion for the Oxfordshire countryside. Discrepancies in wording between a written original and those on the tree are said to be because he carved from memory.
