= Urry =

Urry is a surname. Notable people with the surname include:

- Chris Urry (born 1952), New Zealand Olympic sailor
- Francis L. Urry, American actor
- James Urry, New Zealand anthropologist
- Sir John Urry (soldier) (died 1650), Scottish royalist soldier
- John Urry (literary editor) (1666–1715), literary editor, son of Sir William Urry
- John Urry (sociologist)
- Lewis Urry, Canadian inventor
- Meg Urry, American astrophysicist
- Michelle Urry, cartoon editor of Playboy
- Phil Joel Urry, bassist for The Newsboys
- Sir William Urry (died 1673–1677), Scottish royalist officer

== See also ==
- Hurry (surname)
