= John Urry =

John Urry may refer to:

- John Urry (soldier) (also Hurry) (died 1650), Scottish officer who fought on both sides in the War of the Three Kingdoms
- John Urry (literary editor) (1666–1715), literary editor, nephew of the above
- John Urry (sociologist) (1946–2016), British sociologist

== See also ==
- John Ury (died 1741), Non-juring Anglican priest
