= Chalgrove =

Village and civil parish in England

Coordinates: 51.665°N 1.077°W

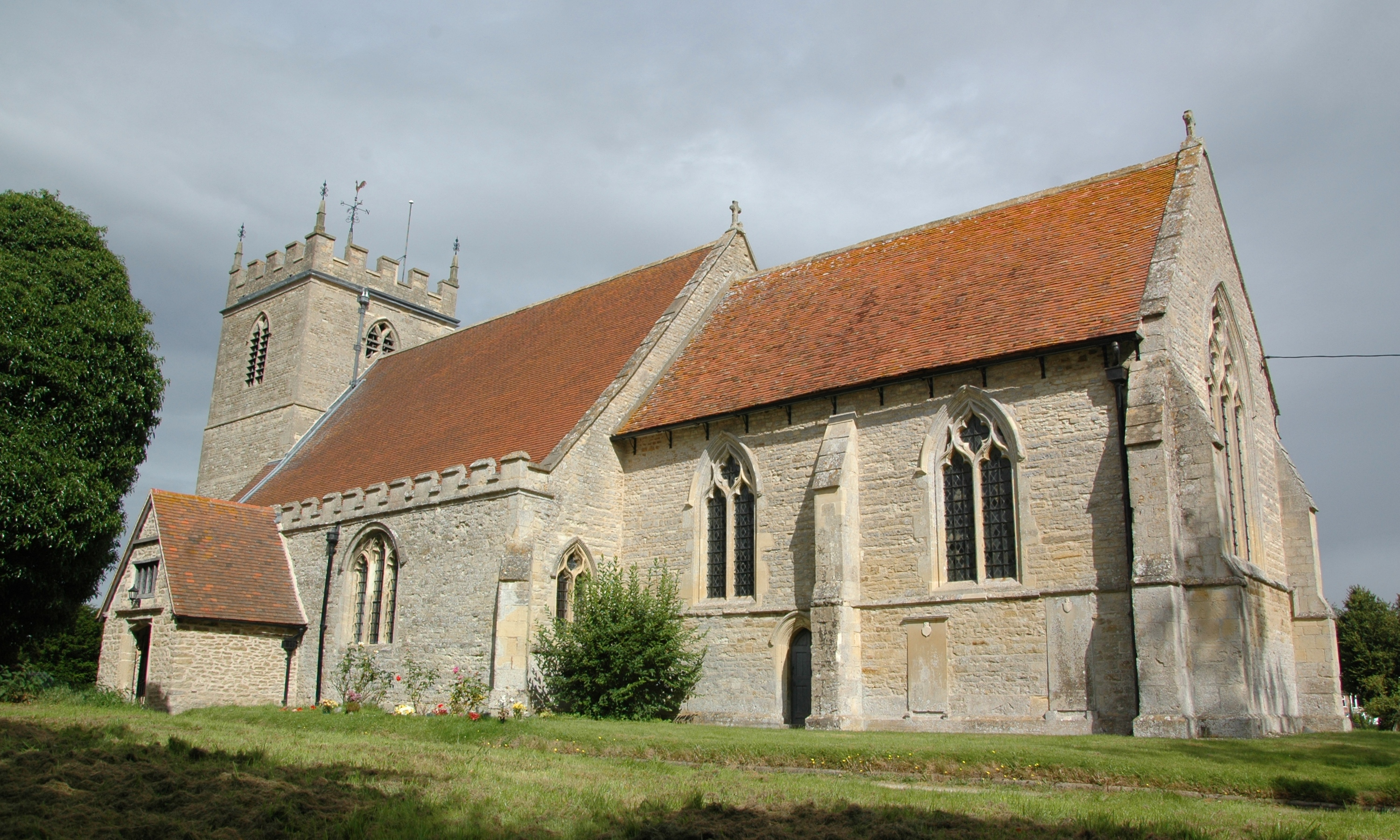
- Parish church of St Mary the Virgin, seen from the southeast

- Location within Oxfordshire
- Area: 11.15 km^{2} (4.31 sq mi)
- Population: 2,830 (2011 Census)
  - Density: 254/km^{2} (660/sq mi)
- OS grid reference: SU6396
- Civil parish: Chalgrove
- District: South Oxfordshire
- Shire county: Oxfordshire
- Region: South East
- Country: England
- Sovereign state: United Kingdom
- Post town: Oxford
- Postcode district: OX44
- Dialling code: 01865
- Police: Thames Valley
- Fire: Oxfordshire
- Ambulance: South Central
- UK Parliament: Henley and Thame
- Website: Chalgrove Parish Council

Chalgrove is a village and civil parish in South Oxfordshire about 10 miles (16 km) southeast of Oxford. The parish includes the hamlet of Rofford and the former parish of Warpsgrove with which it merged in 1932. The 2011 Census recorded the parish population as 2,830. Chalgrove is the site of a small Civil War battle in 1643, the Battle of Chalgrove Field. The Parliamentarian John Hampden was wounded in the battle, and died of his wounds six days later.

== Archaeology ==
A very rare silver Roman coin (circa 271) was found at Chalgrove: a base silver Roman coin called a radiate of Emperor Domitian II. This was the first such coin found in Britain. The only other was found in France and was thought to be a forgery until the discovery of the British coin proved the existence of the short-lived emperor. In the 1976 drought, aerial archaeology found cropmarks of filled-in moats and earthworks beside Back Brook. Subsequent archaeological excavation at this location revealed the remains of a 13th-century moated manor house.

== Manor ==
The Domesday Book of 1086 records the village as Celgrave. Later spellings include Chealgraue in 1170 and Chalcgrava in 1236. It is derived from the Old English cealc-græf or cealc-grafu, meaning "chalk or limestone pit". The manor house is early 15th-century, making it the second-oldest building in Chalgrove. It stands partly on the site of an earlier building, originally the de Plessis manor and manorial court-house.

The great hall has a medieval oak screen on the ground floor, possibly from the 13th-century house, late 16th-century painted grey studding on the first floor and was horizontally subdivided in the 16th century. The hall also has a finely detailed arch-braced collar roof with double purlins with seating for a smoke louvre. The carpentry in the roof is of exceptional quality and it may be that the carpenters were the same as those who built the Royal Palace at nearby Ewelme around the same time. The north wing has a medieval annexe and garderobe chute outlet. The rear extensions are early 16th century. The south wing parlour has 17th-century painted grained panels. The house was repaired and restored in the 1980s. It is a Grade I listed building.

== Parish church ==
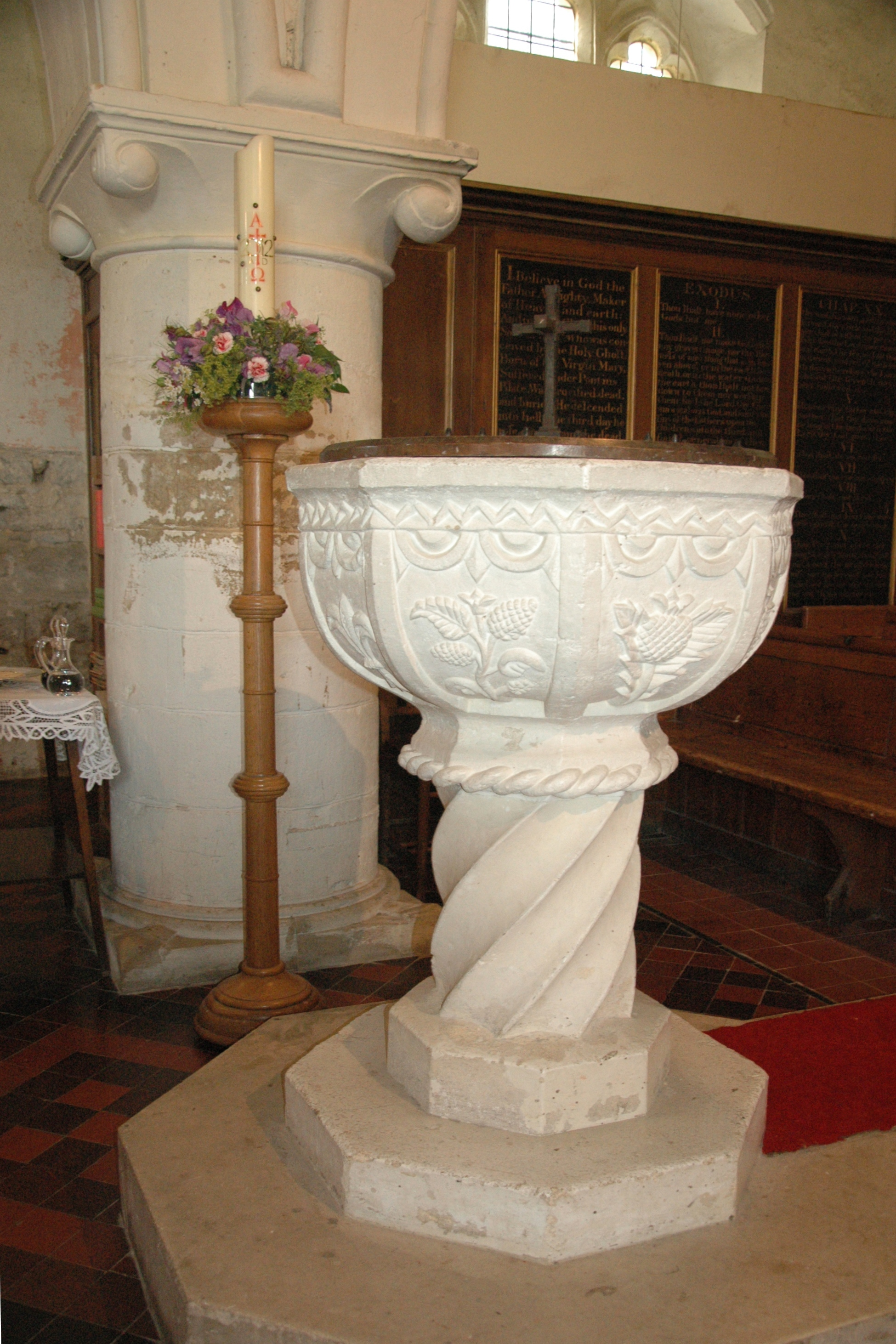
17th-century baptismal font in St Mary's parish church

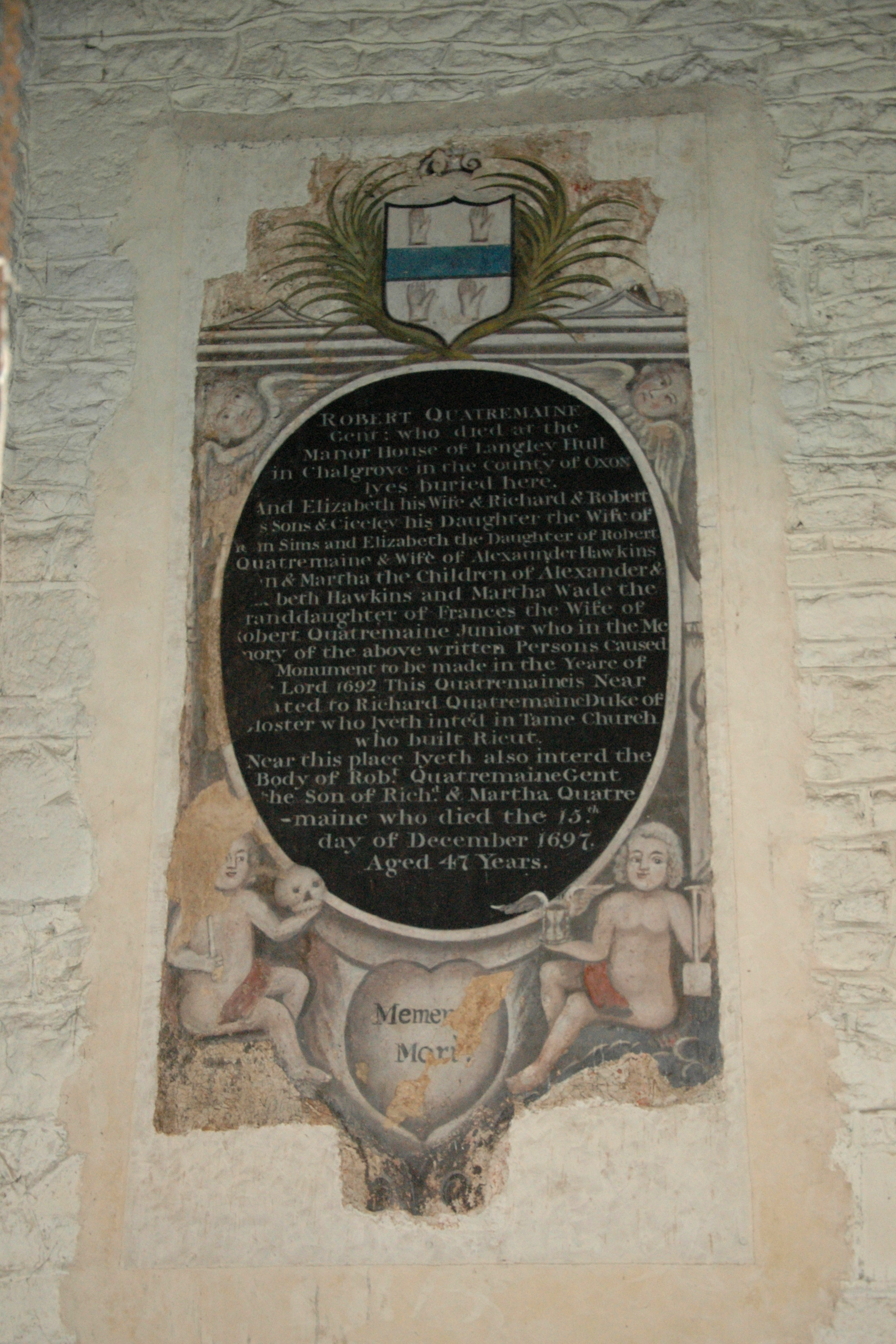
Painted monument in St Mary's parish church to Robert Quatremaine (died 1697)

The earliest parts of the Church of England parish church of St Mary the Virgin date from the 13th century. It was begun by monks from the Abbey of Bec, an important Benedictine abbey in Normandy. There is a canonical sundial on the south wall. The interior comprises a wide nave with two aisles separated by transitional Norman arcades with carved capitals and a chancel. The church is thought to remain substantially as it was in 1500, although some records state that there was a spire on top of the tower until a violent storm in 1727 blew it down. Jennifer Sherwood confirms this and suggests that the "tower was probably remodelled during repairs" at that time.

In the 14th century the chancel was decorated with a series of wall paintings showing a Tree of Jesse, the Last Judgement and the medieval legend of the Assumption of Mary. Historians believe these wall-paintings were completed around 1320 possibly at the request of the de Barantyn family, who lived in one of the two manors in Chalgrove at the time. Sherwood describe the paintings as "one of the most complete series in the country" and suggest that they date from the mid-14th century. The paintings were limewashed over at the time of the English Reformation and rediscovered in 1858 during renovation work commissioned by the then Vicar, Rev. Robert French Laurence. Some of the paintings on the north wall are a little indistinct now due to their age and two of the paintings on the south wall were covered or damaged by marble monuments while the paintings lay hidden under the lime wash.

As well as medieval wall paintings and later stone monuments, St Mary's has a highly unusual painted monument dating from the end of the 17th century. It was painted in or shortly after 1697 on the east wall of St James' chapel, which is in the north aisle of St Mary's. In 1984 it was expertly removed for restoration and repositioned at the east end of the nave. Its removal revealed a hitherto unknown medieval wall painting in St James' chapel, which is earlier than those in the chancel. The west tower has a ring of six bells and there is also a sanctus bell. Henry II Knight of Reading cast the sanctus bell in 1659 and the second, third and fourth bells in 1664. Abraham II Rudhall of Gloucester cast the fifth and tenor bells in 1729. Henry I Bond and Sons of Burford cast the treble bell in 1888. The tower also has a single-handed turret clock, part of which was made about 1699. St Mary's is a Grade I listed building.

St Mary's parish has long been linked with that of St Helen's Berrick Salome. In The Departed Village, Moreau writes "so far as records go back it [St Helen's] has never officially been more than a chapelry of Chalgrove and since the Conquest the indications are that it has never had a priest not shared with that parish. Such an arrangement is the more surprising because Berrick and Chalgrove have had no common boundary for the last thousand years", being separated by Berrick Prior (a part of Newington parish). "Moreover, while the incumbent has been only vicar of Chalgrove," "he is rector of Berrick."

== Economic and social history ==
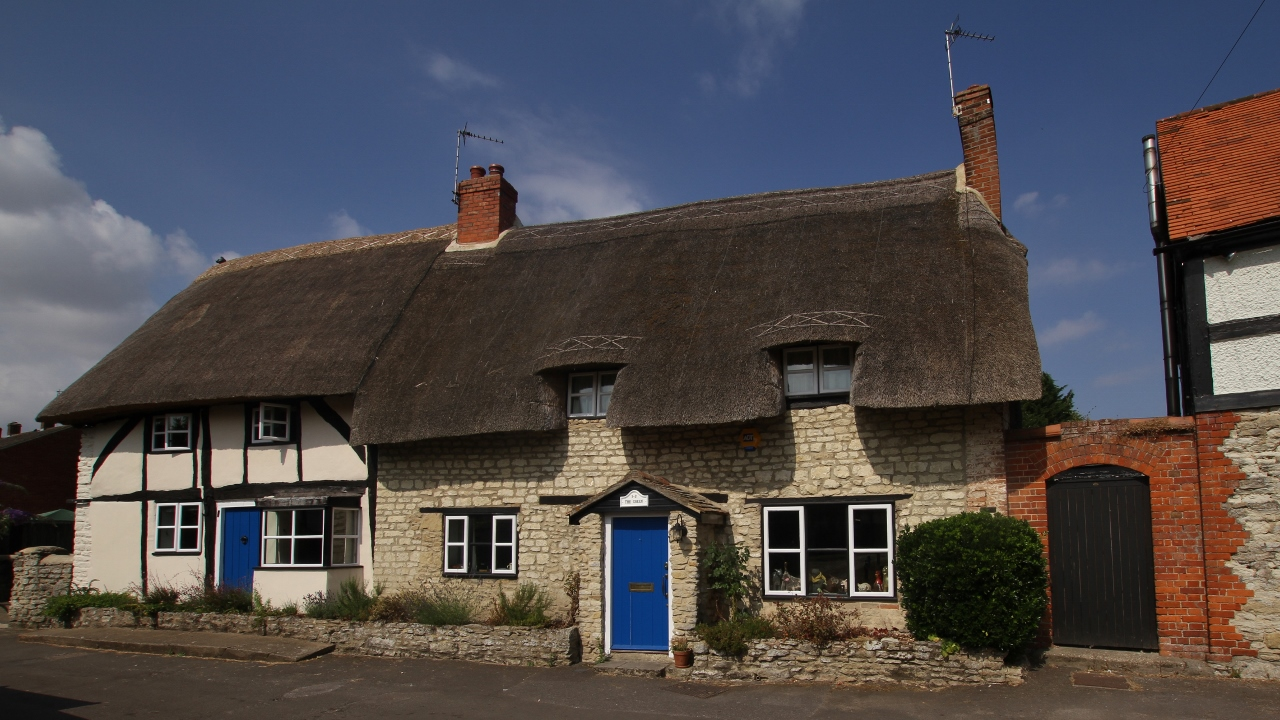
1 and 2 The Green: two 17th- and 18th-century thatched cottages

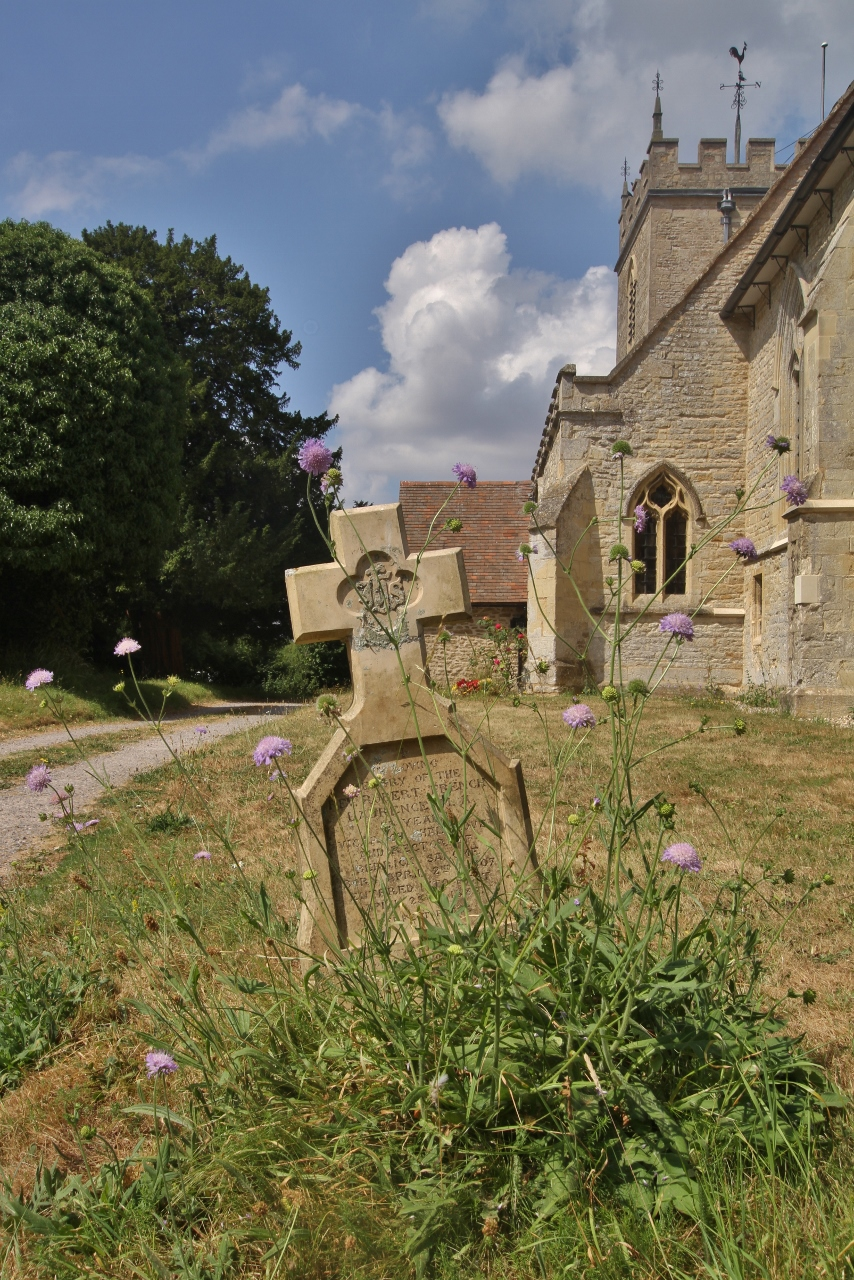
Headstone of Rev. Robert French Laurence (1807–1885) in St Mary's churchyard, with scabious flowering on his grave

Chalgrove originated as a linear village surrounded by open fields occupying a site on the banks of the stream. Early houses were built along the sides of the original road to Oxford. In 1086 the Domesday Book counted five mills operating on Chalgrove Brook. Today there is only one mill, at the western end of the village on the appropriately named 'Mill Lane' opposite The Manor. The mill was restored to working condition in 1998 — including turning the overshot water wheel around to become a high-breast one — and was used to grind corn on an open day in 1999. After Chalgrove, the Brook flows through Stadhampton and then Chiselhampton where it joins the River Thame, a tributary of the River Thames.

Flooding used to be a problem, with 22 houses seriously flooded in 1879. In the 19th century a sluice was built at the eastern end of the village and from the original Chalgrove Stream, now called the Back Brook, some of the water was diverted to run alongside the current High Street. The artificial loop, called the Front Brook, has become a popular feature. The brook's flow is now much reduced and the risk of flooding has declined. Only a small part of the High Street is now deemed to be at occasional risk.

Rev. RF Laurence (1807–1885), who was vicar of Chalgrove and Berrick Salome for the last 53 years of his life founded the parish's school and taught there himself. Laurence was also secretary of the local agricultural workers' trades union. He was a social reformer who campaigned for better housing for agricultural workers and had new thatched cottages built for them in the parish. He is buried at Chalgrove in St Mary's parish churchyard, just south of the chancel.

After a long period of stability, the village's population grew very rapidly from fewer than 1,000 residents in 1961 to just over 3,000 by 1996, mainly due to a new housing estate being developed in the area called Sixpenny Fields between the village core and the more recent bypass, the B480 road. The road into this development is named French Laurence Way after Rev. Laurence. Parts of Chalgrove, and its airfield, featured in the episode Many Happy Returns of the Granada Television series The Prisoner.

== RAF Chalgrove ==
In the Second World War the government needed level ground for airfields. The standard three-runway Chalgrove Airfield was built in 1943, and in February 1944 the United States Army Air Forces moved in with a photo-reconnaissance squadron of Lockheed P-38 Lightning aircraft. Three more squadrons joined in March to bring the station to full strength. These squadrons performed many low-level operations over France to provide valuable information prior to, and shortly after, the Normandy landings in June 1944. In March 1945 the USAAF PR squadrons from nearby RAF Mount Farm moved to Chalgrove with their P-51 Mustang and P-38 Lightning aircraft. Reconnaissance work continued over peacetime Europe in order to assess damage. The USAAF left at the end of 1945.

After the airfield reverted to the RAF becoming a satellite of RAF Benson, until an agreement was reached with the Martin-Baker Aircraft Company to use the airfield to test ejection seats. The first live ejection from a Martin-Baker seat, fitted to a Gloster Meteor, was made over Chalgrove airfield in July 1946. Martin-Baker still uses the airfield. It is mostly used for ejection seat testing and very few aircraft now use the airfield. In 2016 the Ministry of Defence transferred ownership of the airfield site to the Homes and Communities Agency (HCA), which in 2018 was succeeded by Homes England.

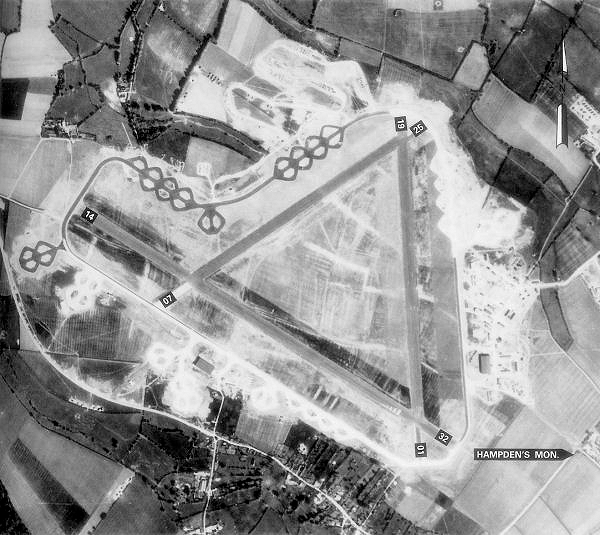
RAF Chalgrove from the air in 1944

== Chalgrove Band ==
Chalgrove Band is an amateur brass band, which was formed toward the end of the 19th century, initially as Chalgrove Temperance Band. The earliest known photograph of the band is dated in 1906. At that time, band practices were held in the top room of the Red Lion public house. Following a break in its history, the band was re-formed in 1972 by three local enthusiasts. In 2007 the band won the London and Southern Counties Fourth Section Championship, and was promoted to the Third Section.

In 2011, the band won promotion to the Second Section of the British Brass Band Association. In March 2012, the band took part in its first London and Southern Counties Areas Contest in the Second Section and came second, qualifying for the National Finals in Cheltenham in September 2012. The band performs regularly in the village, including the May Day Parade, the Remembrance Sunday service and concerts in the Village Hall, which is also where it rehearses.

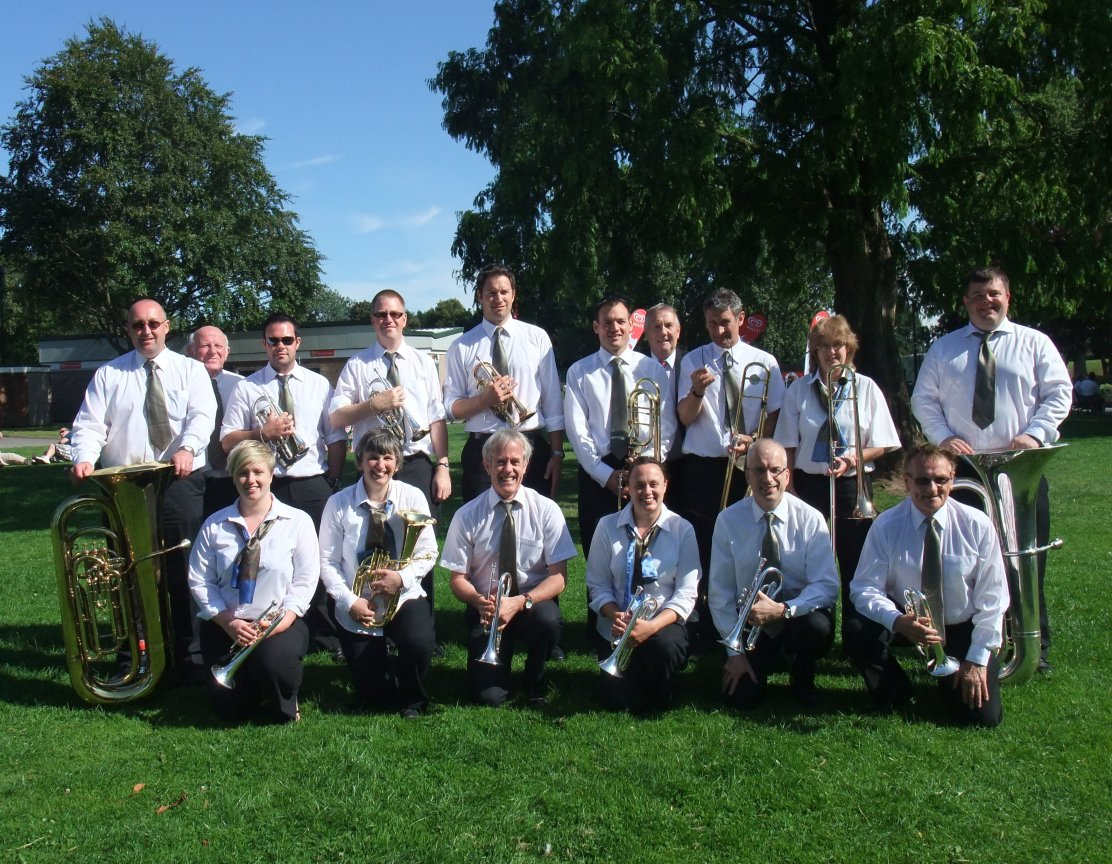
Members of Chalgrove Band in 2011

== Amenities ==
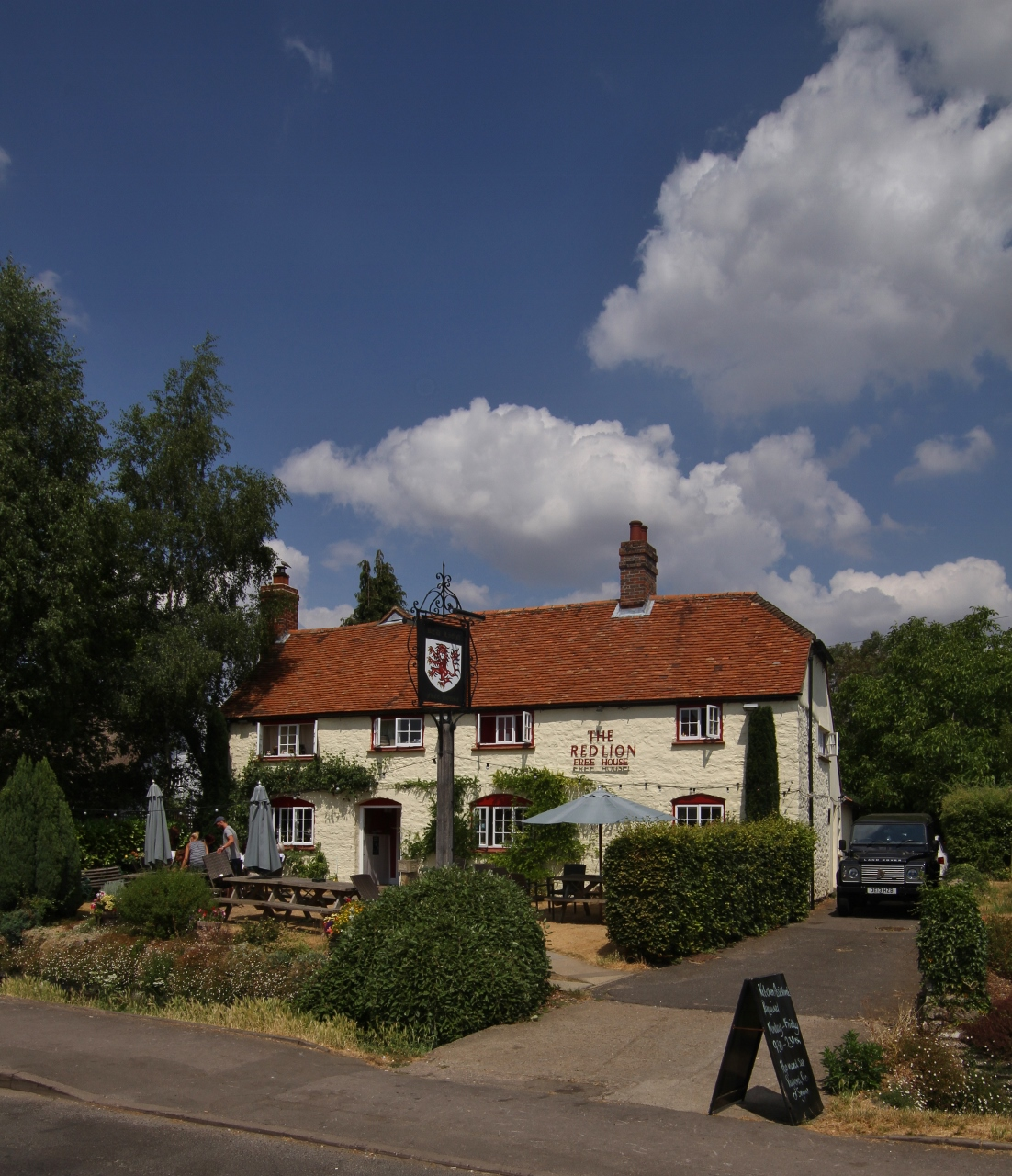
The Red Lion pub

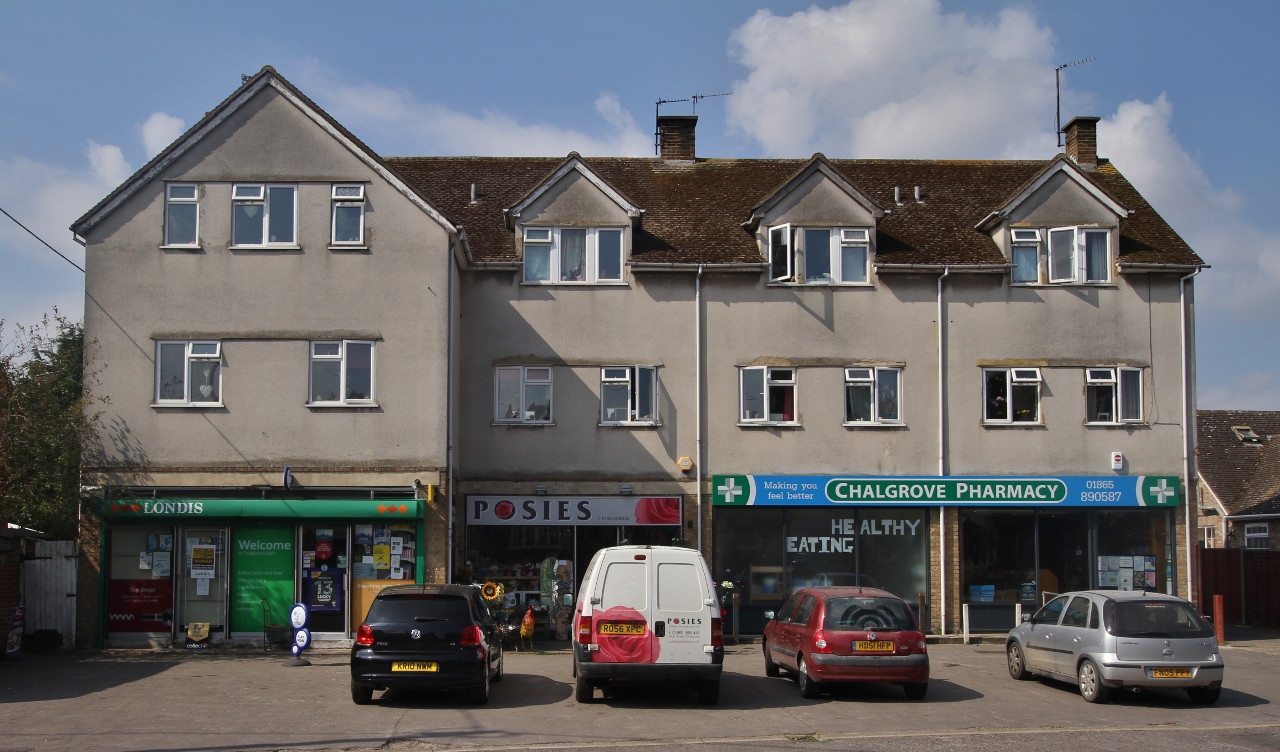
Shops at 60–66 High Street

The village has three public houses, all on the High Street. The Lamb is at the west end of the village. The Crown and the Red Lion are in the centre of the village, beside the green. The Red Lion is a 15th- or 16th-century building. Its outside walls are stone but inside is some timber framing including a cruck. The pub belongs to St Mary's church and is vested in the Trustees of the Church Estate, but is leased out. In the High Street are a sub-post office and four other shops including two grocers, a florist and a pharmacy. The village has a general practitioners' practice, The Brook Surgery.

The village has a primary school, with a foundation class for younger children. The local authority provides a bus service for older children to travel to local secondary schools. Monument Park business park, opposite the airfield and away from the main village, hosts a range of businesses. Chalgrove Cricket Club plays in Oxfordshire Cricket Association League Division Six. Chalgrove Cavaliers Football Club organises football for boys and girls between the ages of five and 16. Chalgrove FC is the parish's football club for adults. It played in the Oxfordshire Senior Football League in the 2012–13 season. It has a partnership agreement with the Chalgrove Cavaliers.

Chalgrove has a Women's Institute. Regular local events include the May Day Festival and the annual Chalgrove Music Festival, held every year since 1988. Chalgrove has held a Midsummer Ball in alternate years in the grounds of Chalgrove Manor. It was due to hold one in 2018 but this was cancelled for want of support.

Chalgrove Village Hall hosted the annual World Miniature Wargaming Championship (TtS! ruleset) in September 2022 and has done since 2016.

Thames Travel bus route 11 serves Chalgrove six days a week, linking the village with Oxford via Stadhampton, Garsington and Cowley and with Watlington via Cuxham. Buses run almost hourly from Mondays to Saturdays and every few hours on Sundays.

== Bibliography ==
- Ekwall, Eilert (1960) [1936]. Concise Oxford Dictionary of English Place-Names (4th ed.). Oxford: Oxford University Press. Chalgrave. ISBN 0198691033.
- Gray, Howard L (1959) [1915]. The English Field Systems. Cambridge, MA; London: Harvard University Press; Merlin Press. pp. 18–23, 124.
- Heath-Whyte, RW (2003). An Illustrated Guide to the Medieval Wall Paintings in the Church of Saint Mary the Virgin at Chalgrove in the County of Oxfordshire. Chalgrove: PCC St Mary's Chalgrove. ISBN 0-9544681-0-4.
- Lewis, Samuel, ed. (1931) [1848]. "Chalgrove (St. Mary)". A Topographical Dictionary of England (Seventh ed.). London: Samuel Lewis. p. 545.
- Long, ET (1972). "Medieval Wall Paintings in Oxfordshire Churches" (PDF). Oxoniensia. XXXVII. Oxfordshire Architectural and Historical Society: 86–113. ISSN 0308-5562.
- Moreau, RE (1968). The Departed Village: Berrick Salome at the Turn of the Century. Oxford: Oxford University Press. ISBN 0-19-211186-8.
- Oakes, Catherine (2009). "Fourteenth-century Ways of Seeing: the Chancel Wall Paintings at Chalgrove, Oxfordshire" (PDF). Oxoniensia. LXXIV. Oxfordshire Architectural and Historical Society: 19–34. ISSN 0308-5562.
- Page, Philip; Atherton, Kate; Hardy, Alan (2004). Barentin's Manor: Excavations of the moated manor at Hardings Field, Chalgrove, Oxfordshire 1976–9. Thames Valley Landscape Series. Vol. 24. Oxford: Oxford University School of Archaeology. ISBN 0-947816-62-3.
- Sherwood, Jennifer; Pevsner, Nikolaus (1974). Oxfordshire. The Buildings of England. Harmondsworth: Penguin Books. pp. 525–526. ISBN 0-14-071045-0.
