= Chalgrove Brook =

River in Oxfordshire, England

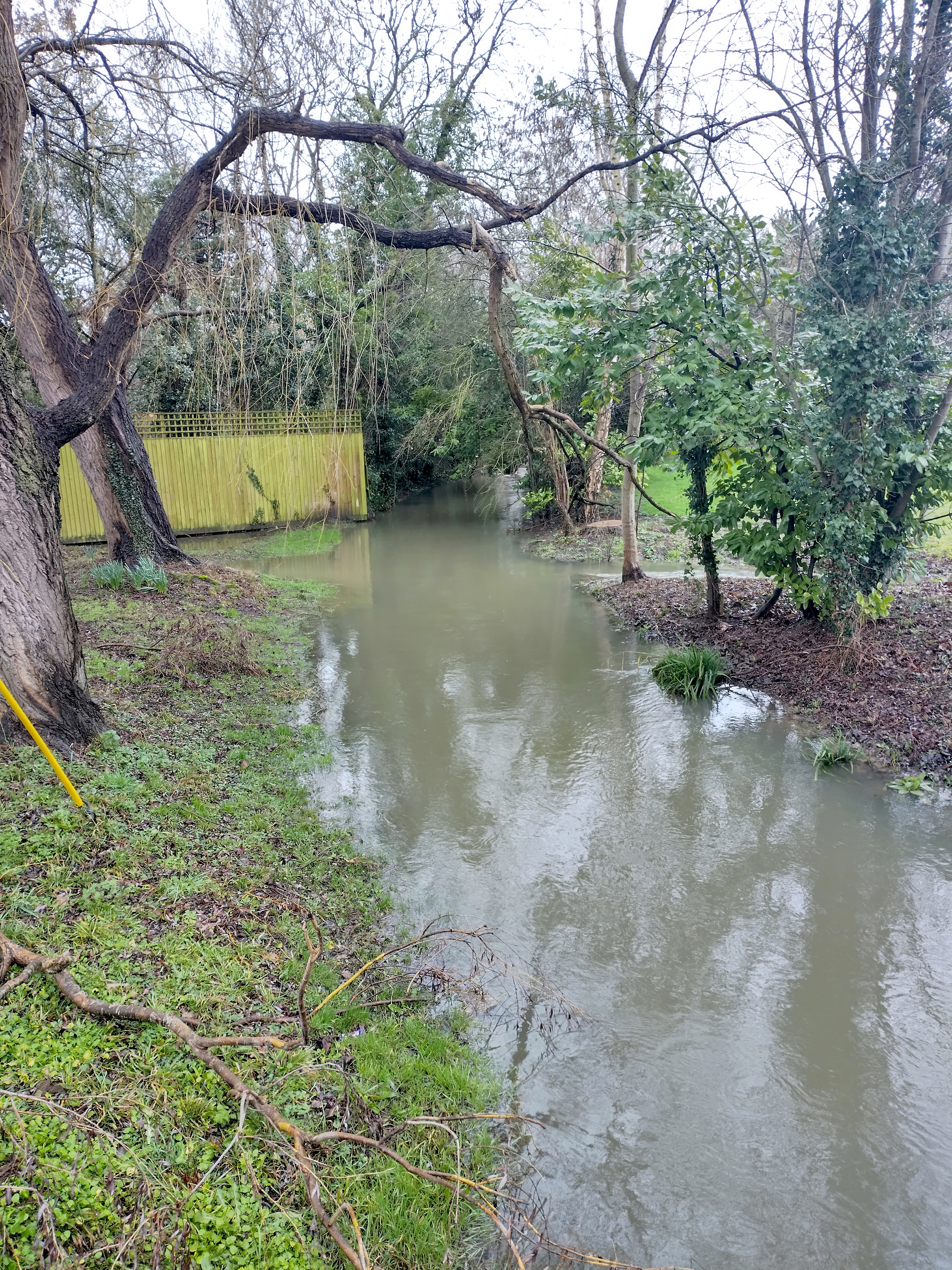
- Chalgrove Brook at Stadhampton, looking upstream (east)
- Etymology: Chalgrove

Physical characteristics
- Source: Chilterns
  - location: Watlington
- Mouth: River Thame
  - location: Chiselhampton
  - coordinates: 51.6842°N 1.1424°E
- Length: c. 7 miles (11 km)

Basin features
- Progression: Chalgrove Brook→ Thame→ Thames→ North Sea

Chalgrove Brook is a chalk stream located in South Oxfordshire, England.

It is a left tributary of the River Thame. It rises in a number of natural springs at the foot of the Chiltern Hills in and near Watlington, and flows in a northwesterly direction for approximately 7 miles (11 km) through Cuxham, Chalgrove, and Stadhampton, before emptying into the Thame near Chiselhampton.

The brook floods occasionally, especially in and downstream of Chalgrove. To relieve this, a man-made conduit was built in Chalgrove, splitting the stream in two.

The stream is home to brown trout, mink, otter and water vole, and possibly also the endangered white-clawed crayfish. As part of the brook's conservation efforts, in 2023 a fish pass was created to circumvent Stadhampton Mill, making available 2 miles (3.2 km) of the brook that was previously impassable to fish.
