= Edward James (priest) =

Edward James (1569 – 1610 or later) was a Welsh Anglican priest and translator.

== Life ==
James was born in Glamorgan, south Wales in 1569. He was educated at the University of Oxford, initially matriculating as a member of St Edmund Hall in 1586 and later graduating from Jesus College with a Bachelor of Arts degree in 1589 and a Master of Arts degree in 1592. He became a Fellow of Jesus College sometime in 1589 or 1590, a position he held until about 1596.

After ordination, James's career was assisted by William Morgan, translator of the Bible into Welsh and Bishop of Llandaff after 1595. James became vicar of Caerleon in 1596, rector of Shirenewton in 1597, rector of Llangattock-juxta-Usk in 1598, vicar of Llangattock Feibion Afel in 1599 (all in the county of Monmouthshire), and vicar of Llangattock-juxta-Neath, Glamorgan in 1603. He was appointed chancellor of the Diocese of Llandaff in 1606. While one source gives his death date as 1610, another puts it as late as 1620.

== Works ==
James translated the first Book of Homilies into Welsh in 1606. These were twelve authorised sermons on fundamental aspects of Christianity to be read in churches where there was no authorised preacher. This work was inspired by the activities of William Morgan, although Morgan died in 1604 before the work was published.

The linguistic style of the translation owes much to Morgan, and in its turn influenced poets such as Rhys Prichard. Further editions were published in 1817 (John Roberts of Tremeirchion, Flintshire) and in 1847 (Morris Williams ("Nicander")).
