= Ascott, Oxfordshire =

Hamlet in Oxfordshire, England

Coordinates: 51.67822°N 1.11562°W

Ascott
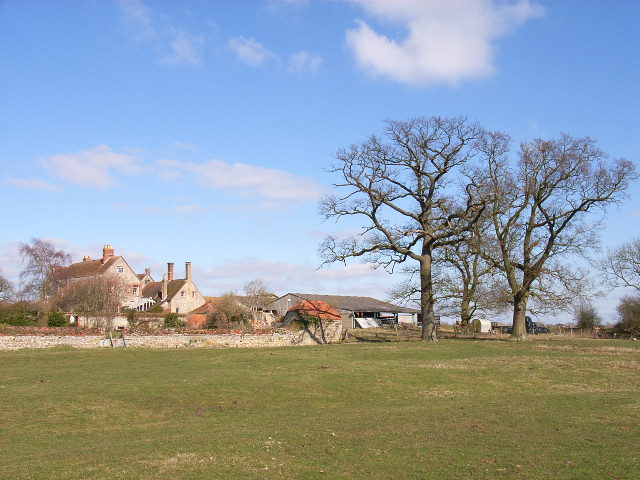
- A farm in Ascott, with part of Ascott Manor and its gardens visible on the left

- Location within Oxfordshire
- OS grid reference: SU6097
- Civil parish: Stadhampton
- District: South Oxfordshire
- Shire county: Oxfordshire
- Region: South East
- Country: England
- Sovereign state: United Kingdom
- Post town: Oxford
- Postcode district: OX44
- Dialling code: 01865
- Police: Thames Valley
- Fire: Oxfordshire
- Ambulance: South Central
- UK Parliament: Henley

Ascott is a hamlet and manor house in the civil parish of Stadhampton, in the South Oxfordshire district, in the county of Oxfordshire, England. Ascott lies close to the River Thame north-east of Dorchester, about 8 miles (13 km) to the south-east of the centre of Oxford.

The original settlement dates to at least the Anglo-Saxon period, and the name ‘Ascott’ is derived from the Old English ēast (east) and cot (cottage). Ascott is recorded in the Domesday Book of 1086 as one of two knight's fees under the lordship of the Bishop of Lincoln, at that time part of the neighbouring parish of Great Milton. The settlement was held until the middle of the thirteenth century by the D'Oyly family until it came under the ownership of a John Fiennes or Fynes, one of the lords of the manor of Ascott, in 1316.

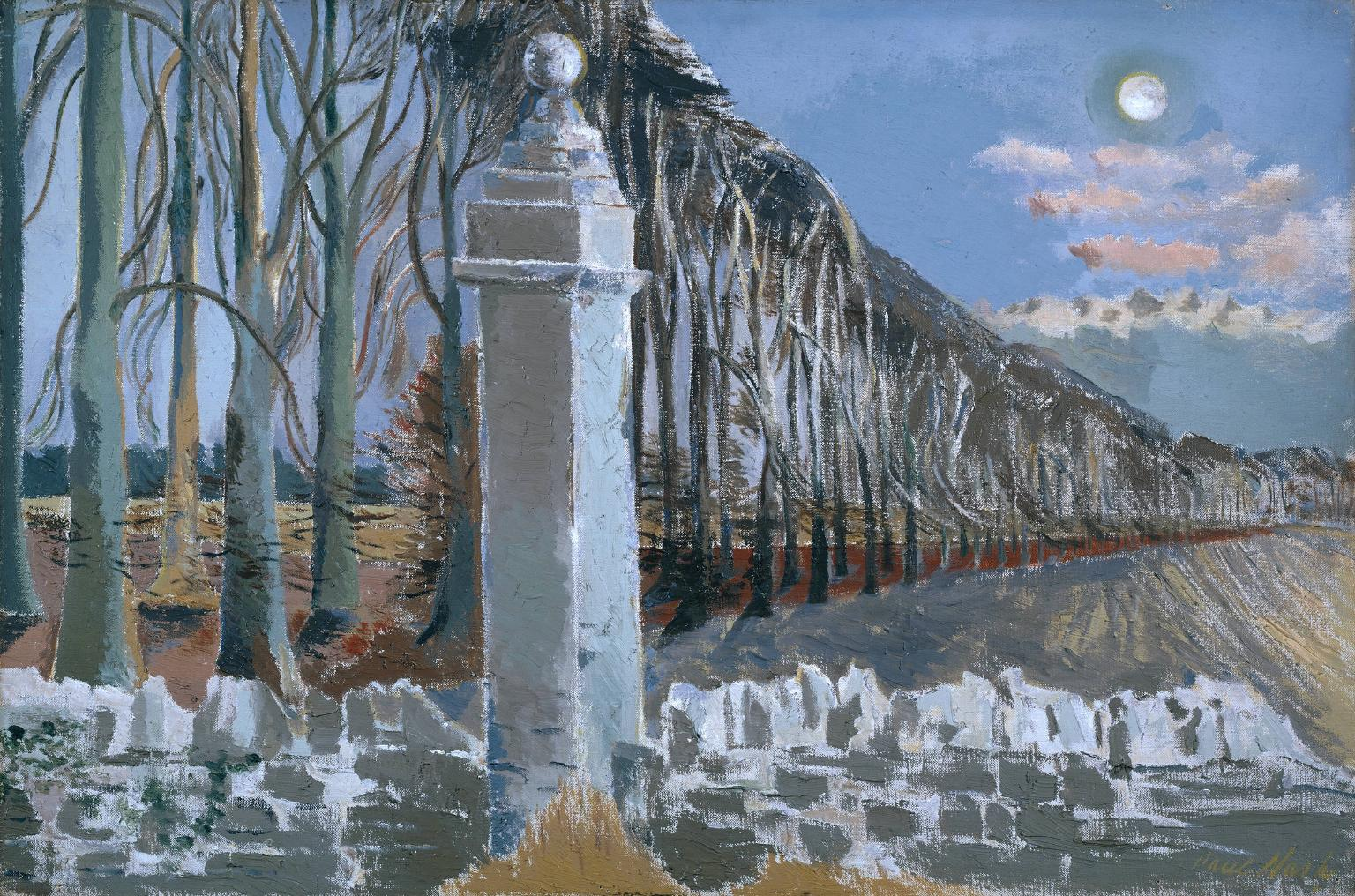
Paul Nash's Pillar and Moon (1932-1942), collection of the Tate

Ascott remained in the hands of the Fiennes family until the fifteenth century, including under the ownership of James Fiennes, 1st Baron Saye and Sele, a celebrated English soldier and statesman of the Hundred Years' War and Lord Chamberlain to Henry VI of England. By 1510, Ascott was in the possession of the Dormer family, and it remained one of the seats of the family for many generations, alongside Rousham House. A substantial house built by Sir William Dormer may have been attacked during a Parliamentarian raid on Ascott during the English Civil War in 1642, and subsequently burnt down. The site of this house forms part of Ascott Park. One of the gateway pillars of Ascott Park is the subject of surrealist painter and war artist Paul Nash's 1932–1942 oil painting Pillar and Moon, while the gateway itself (as well as its wrought iron gates) is held by the Victoria and Albert Museum and is on display at the Bodleian Library in Oxford.

Ascott was formerly a hamlet in the parish of Great Milton. In 1866 Ascott became a separate civil parish, but on 1 April 1932 the parish was abolished and merged with Stadhampton. In 1931 the parish had a population of 55.

The current Ascott Manor was built circa 1620 in the reign of James I and extended circa 1800. The house is Grade II listed on the National Heritage List for England.
