= Dad Brook =

River in Buckinghamshire, England

Coordinates: 51.781811°N 000.952855°W

Dad Brook is a minor, 3.23 km (2.01 mi) long river in Buckinghamshire, England that is a tributary to the River Thame.

Located completely within the Aylesbury Vale district, the river rises in the south of the village and civil parish Cuddington, near the county town of Aylesbury, and flows west for 3.23 km (2.01 mi) alongside Aylesbury Road before flowing into the River Thame in the village and parish of Chearsley.
