= River Thame =

River in Southern England

Coordinates: 51°38′N 1°09′W

Thame
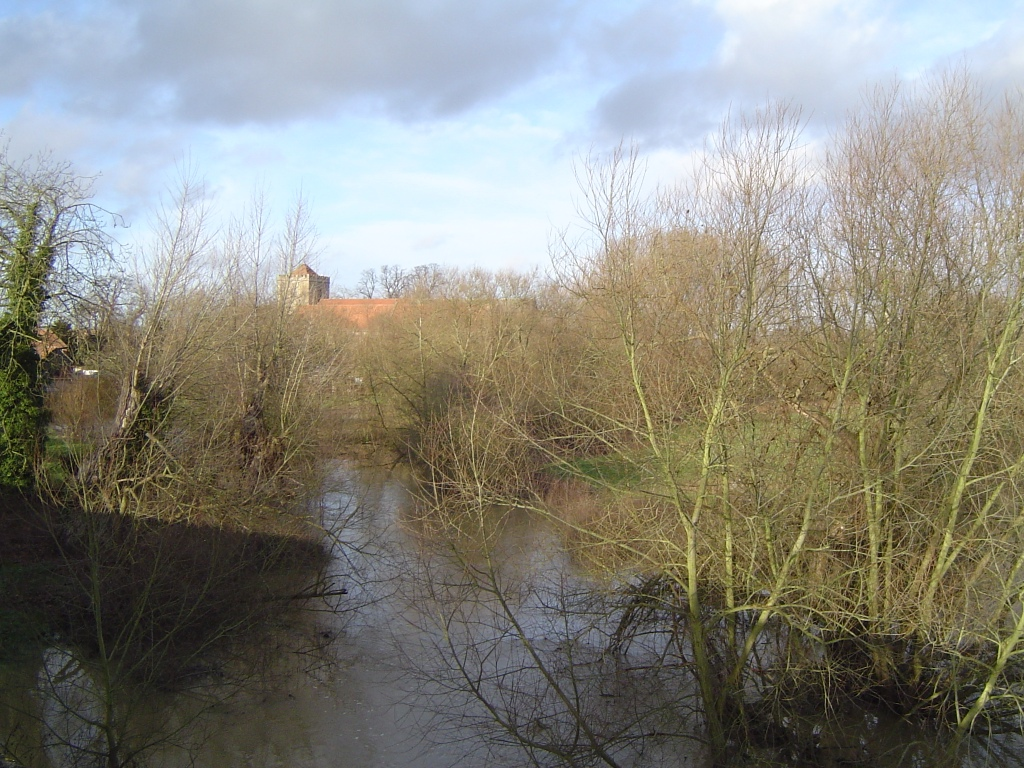
- River Thame south of Dorchester (wider than usual because of flood waters)

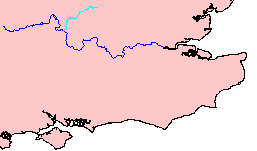
- Rivers Thame (cyan) and Thames (blue) in south-east England

Location
- Country: England
- Counties: Buckinghamshire, Oxfordshire
- Towns: Aylesbury, Dorchester

Physical characteristics
- Source: 2 km (1.2 mi) due east of Hulcott
  - location: Vale of Aylesbury
  - coordinates: 51°50'32.7"N 0°44'10.9"W
  - elevation: 80 m (260 ft)
- Mouth: River Thames
  - location: Dorchester
  - coordinates: 51°38'05.2"N 1°09'57.1"W
  - elevation: 47 m (154 ft)
- Length: 65 km (40 mi)
- Discharge
  - location: Wheatley, Oxfordshire
  - average: 3.90 m^{3}/s (138 cu ft/s)
  - minimum: 0.60 m^{3}/s (21 cu ft/s)14 September 1990
  - maximum: 53.1 m^{3}/s (1,880 cu ft/s)4 February 1990

The River Thame /ˈteɪm/ is a river in Southern England. A tributary of the River Thames, the river runs generally south-westward for about 40 mi (64 km) from its source above the Buckinghamshire town of Aylesbury to the Thames in south-east Oxfordshire.

== Course ==
Three streams which rise within the Vale of Aylesbury, on the northwest side of the Chiltern Hills, join to form the River Thame to the east of the small village of Hulcott, north of Aylesbury. The first 650 m (2,130 ft) of the river form the boundary between Buckinghamshire and Hertfordshire. The Thame played a key role in the English Civil War when John Hampden (the town's Member of Parliament) led the force of Parliamentarians successfully defending Aylesbury at the Battle of Holman's Bridge, where a small road crosses the river, in 1642.

The river passes by the 21st century small suburb of Watermead and around the north and west of Aylesbury, passing through farmland to the villages of Nether Winchendon and Chearsley before reaching the market town of Thame with which it shares its name. Thame is about 15 miles (24 km) east of Oxford and grew from an Anglo-Saxon settlement beside the river. In Anglo-Saxon England, Thame is a recorded place in records of the Diocese of Dorchester.

At Holton mill the Thame turns southward and after passing the villages of Great Milton and Stadhampton, its valley widens. In this area in 1642 and 1643, the river acted as a line of defence for Royalist Oxford. The bridges at Wheatley, Cuddesdon Mill and Chiselhampton were key crossing points, with Chiselhampton Bridge playing a critical part in Prince Rupert's movements before and after the Battle of Chalgrove Field.

== Confluence with the Thames ==
Finally the Thame reaches the village of Dorchester on Thames, Oxfordshire. As the suffix -chester indicates, a Romano-British settlement was on the site. The small town's central streets are typically Anglo-Saxon, being not quite straight and set at various angles. The Saxon cathedral here was superseded by Dorchester Abbey, so-called since the English Reformation—-the name denotes its surviving structure, which was its main building, the abbey church. That church, built in 1170, is 70 m (230 ft) in length and is a listed building at Grade I.

In the far south of that parish, 0.8 km (0.5 mi) south of the town centre, the Thame flows into the River Thames, between Day's Lock and Benson Lock.

The upper River Thames has an alternative name, the Isis, up to the point where it reaches this confluence.

== Tributaries ==
- Chalgrove Brook
- Dad Brook

== See also ==
- Tributaries of the River Thames
- List of rivers of England
- River Thames#Name

Next confluence upstream	River Thames	Next confluence downstream
Wilts & Berks Canal (south)	River Thame	River Pang (south)
