= Brookhampton, Oxfordshire =

Hamlet in Oxfordshire, England

Coordinates: 51°40′48″N 1°07′48″W

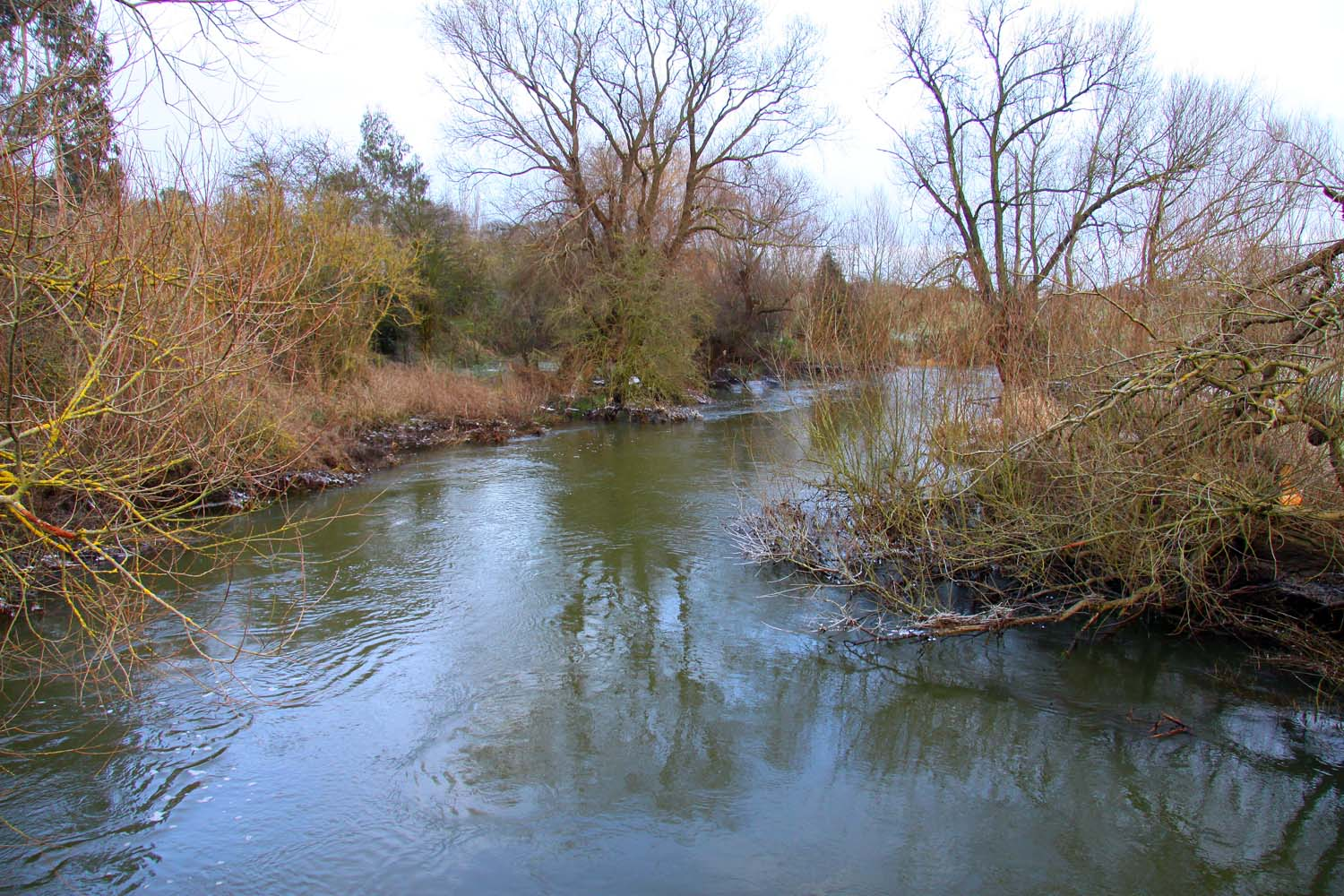
The River Thame at Brookhampton

Brookhampton is a hamlet in the village and civil parish of Stadhampton, 6 miles (9.7 km) north of Wallingford, in South Oxfordshire, England.
