= John Roberts (Vicar of Tremeirchion) =

Welsh Anglican priest

John Roberts (1775 – 25 July 1829) was a Welsh Anglican priest and writer.

== Life ==
Roberts was born in 1775 in Denbighshire, north Wales, and educated at Jesus College, Oxford between 1792 and 1796, where he obtained a Bachelor of Arts degree. He stayed in Oxford to help to correct the edition of the Welsh Bible and Prayer Book that was published by the Society for the Promotion of Christian Knowledge in 1799. He was ordained and became curate of the Oxfordshire parishes of Chiselhampton and Stadhampton in 1798, returning to Wales in 1803 as curate (and from 1807, vicar) of Tremeirchion, Flintshire. He was opposed to the views on Welsh orthography of William Owen Pughe, whose views had influenced Thomas Charles to print the British and Foreign Bible Society's edition of the Welsh Bible in the orthography favoured by Pughe. The views of Roberts finally prevailed after several letters between him, Charles and the Society. He had a similar debate, in print, with John Jones (Tegid) ("Tegid") about the Welsh Book of Common Prayer. Whilst opposed to Methodism, he used some of their practices such as prayer meetings. He edited a reprinted edition of a translation into Welsh of the Book of Homilies (1817) and published a Welsh hymnal (1831). He died on 25 July 1829.
