= Stadhampton =

Village in Oxfordshire, England

Coordinates: 51.68°N 1.13°W

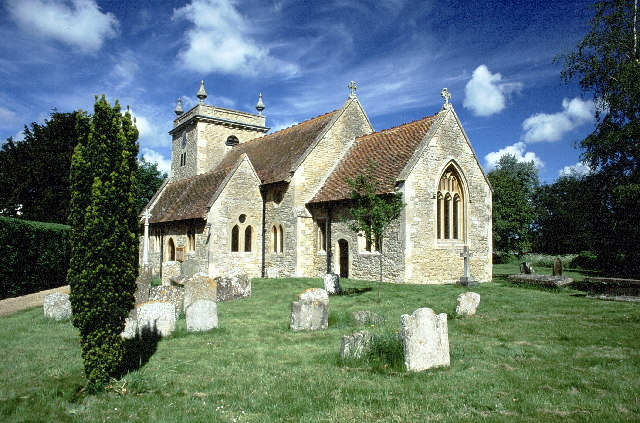
- Parish church of St John the Baptist, seen from the southeast

- Location within Oxfordshire
- Area: 9.80 km^{2} (3.78 sq mi)
- Population: 832 (parish, including Chiselhampton, Brookhampton and Ascott) (2011 Census)
  - Density: 85/km^{2} (220/sq mi)
- OS grid reference: SU6097
- Civil parish: Stadhampton
- District: South Oxfordshire
- Shire county: Oxfordshire
- Region: South East
- Country: England
- Sovereign state: United Kingdom
- Post town: Oxford
- Postcode district: OX44
- Dialling code: 01865
- Police: Thames Valley
- Fire: Oxfordshire
- Ambulance: South Central
- UK Parliament: Henley and Thame
- Website: Stadhampton Grapevine

Stadhampton is a village and civil parish about 7 miles (11 km) southeast of Oxford in South Oxfordshire, England. Stadhampton is close to the River Thame, a tributary of the River Thames. The village was first mentioned by name in 1146, and was in the ownership of the bishops of Lincoln, the crown, and various Oxford colleges for most of subsequent history. The village includes several buildings of historical and architectural interest, including a parish church with features dating back to the 12th-century.

== Toponym ==
The toponym "Stadhampton" was recorded as Stodeham in 1146 and Stodham in 1316. The name is derived from Old English, probably Stod-hāmm meaning "river meadow where horses were kept". Stadham has also been used, including colloquially to the present day, and the "ton" suffix seems to have been added relatively late in the village's history.

== History ==
The Domesday Book of 1086 does not mention Stadhampton by name, but the settlement evidently formed part of the demesne lands of the Bishop of Lincoln's Dorchester manor. Dorchester on Thames was the first Anglo-Saxon bishopric of England, and was the de facto capital of Wessex until being displaced by Winchester in 660. Dorchester manor and the village of Stadhampton remained in the ownership of the bishops of Lincoln for almost a thousand years until they passed into the ownership of Edward VI in 1547, continuing in the ownership of the crown until Elizabeth I granted the manor to Henry, Lord Norreys of Rycote. The village then passed through the ownership of several prominent families until being acquired by the Oxford colleges of Oriel and Christ Church in 1740, and subsequently by Magdalen College in 1927.

== Location ==
The parish is about 10 miles (16 km) south-east of Oxford and includes the villages of Stadhampton and Chiselhampton and hamlets of Ascott and Brookhampton. The 2011 Census recorded the parish's population as 832. The A329 between Thame and Shillingford passes through the village. The River Thame separates Stadhampton and Chiselhampton. Stadhampton and Brookhampton are separated by Chalgrove Brook, which flows from Watlington through Chalgrove and joins the Thame just above Chiselhampton Bridge. Northwest of Chiselhampton is Richmond Hill, whose summit is more than 279 feet (85 m) above sea level.

== Parish church ==
The oldest part of the Church of England parish church of St John the Baptist is the 12th-century Norman baptismal font. Some 15th-century Perpendicular Gothic features survive, including the north aisle, three-bay north arcade and the chancel arch. The church has a west tower that was built in 1737. In 1875 the church was rebuilt and enlarged to designs by the Gothic Revival architect EG Bruton, who added a south aisle and three-bay south arcade.

The tower has a ring of four bells. Henry I Knight of Reading, Berkshire cast the treble and second bells in 1621. Mears and Stainbank of the Whitechapel Bell Foundry cast the third bell in 1883 and the tenor bell in 1884. For technical reasons the bells are currently unringable. Since the Reformation St John's has always had the same parish clergy as St Mary's, Chiselhampton. The Welsh clergyman and writer John Roberts was priest of both parishes in 1798–1803.

== Economic and social history ==
The village includes several buildings of historical and architectural interest, including a number that are Grade II listed. The former Black Horse public house on Thame Road was built in 1751. Ash Cottage in School Lane is formed from three former cottages dating from the 17th century, now a single house. On the main street is a 17th-century bakehouse, thatched and built of coursed stone and bearing the date 1658, that was used as a bakery until about 1914. In the 18th century Stadhampton had two clockmakers: James Jordan (born about 1751) and Thomas Jordan, who worked together. Thomas repaired the turret clock at St Peter's parish church, Great Haseley on several occasions between 1770 and 1790.

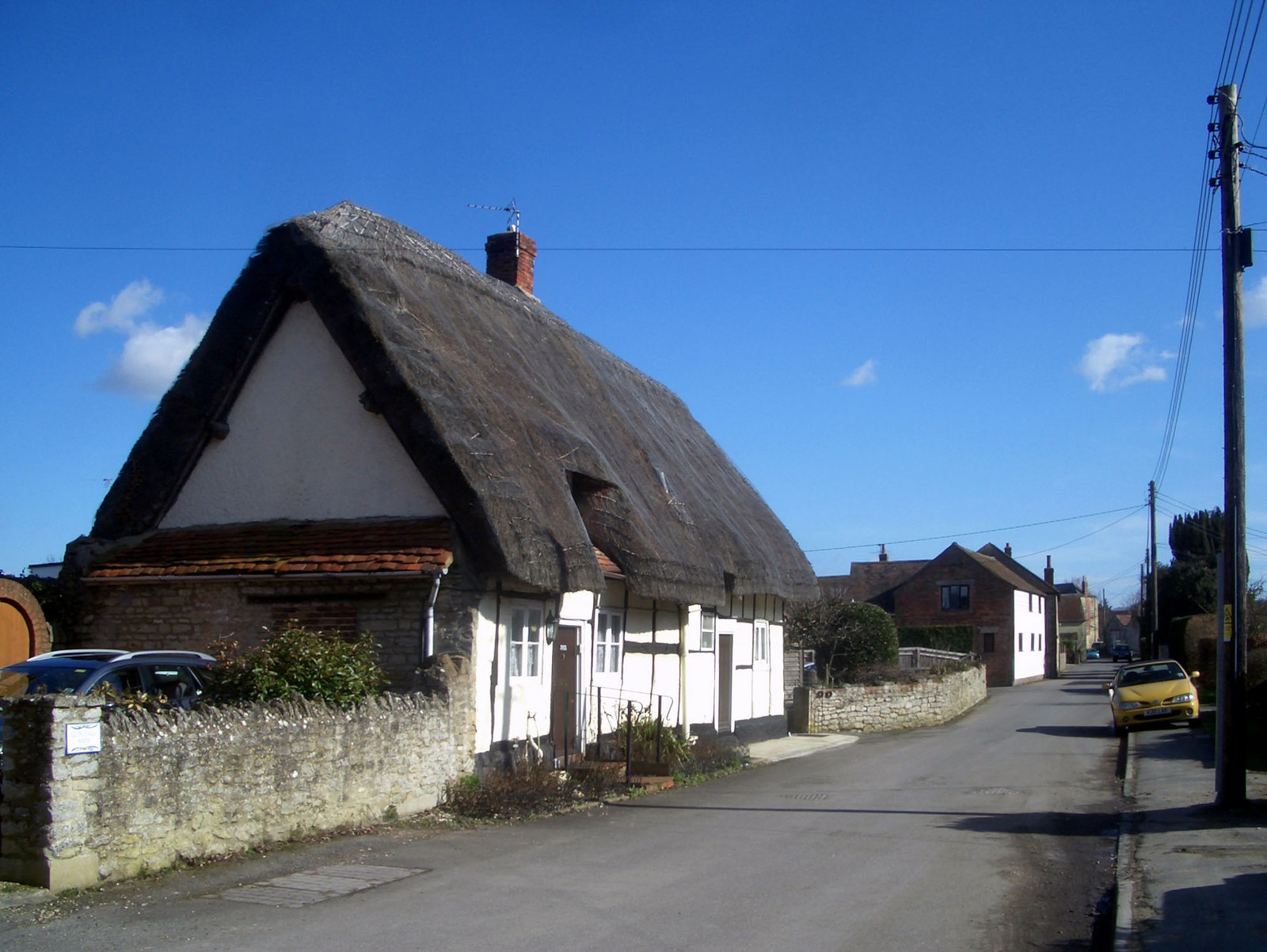
17th-century thatched cottages in School Lane

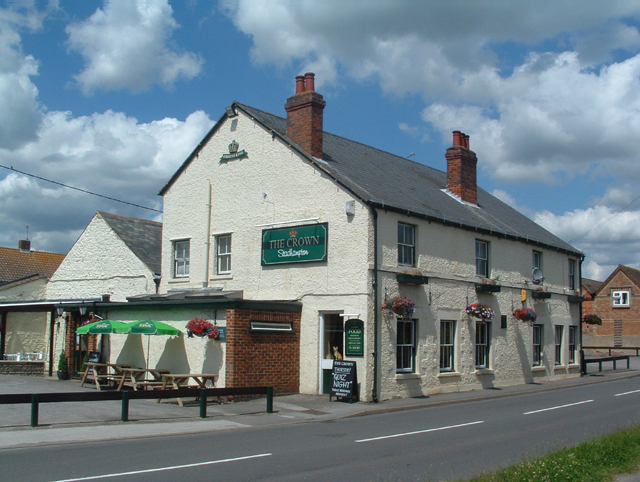
The Crown public house

== Amenities ==
Most of the amenities of the parish are in the village, including Stadhampton Primary School. Stadhampton village school used to be at the bottom of School Lane but is now in Cratlands Close. The parish has two pub-restaurants: The Coach & Horses Inn in Chiselhampton, and the Crazy Bear Hotel in Stadhampton; previously a third, The Crown operated in the village, but was closed down permanently in 2024. Stadhampton has a petrol station that includes a village store. Oxfordshire Animal Sanctuary is in Stadhampton. Thames Travel bus route T1 serves Stadhampton six days a week, linking the village with Oxford via Garsington and Cowley and with Watlington via Chalgrove. Buses run hourly from Mondays to Fridays and every 125 minutes on Saturdays. There is no Sunday service.

== Sources ==
- Beeson, CFC (1989) [1962]. Simcock, AV (ed.). Clockmaking in Oxfordshire 1400–1850 (3rd ed.). Oxford: Museum of the History of Science. p. 116 0. ISBN 0-903364-06-9.
- Ekwall, Eilert (1960) [1936]. Concise Oxford Dictionary of English Place-Names (4th ed.). Oxford: Oxford University Press. Stadhampton. ISBN 0198691033.
- Lobel, Mary D, ed. (1962). "Stadhampton". A History of the County of Oxford. Victoria County History. Vol. 7: Thame and Dorchester Hundreds. London: Oxford University Press for the Institute of Historical Research. pp. 81–92.
- Sherwood, Jennifer; Pevsner, Nikolaus (1974). Oxfordshire. The Buildings of England. Harmondsworth: Penguin Books. p. 776. ISBN 0-14-071045-0.
