= Hurry (surname) =

Hurry is a surname. Notable people with the surname include:

- Andrew Hurry (born 1964), English cricket coach
- John Hurry (1920–2015), British Royal Air Force officer
- Linda Hurry, US Air Force general
- Paul Hurry (born 1975), British motorcycle speedway rider
- Polly Hurry (1883–1963), Australian painter

== See also ==
- Urry
