= Watermead, Buckinghamshire =

Civil parish in Aylesbury, Buckinghamshire

Coordinates: 51.832547°N 0.806247°W

Watermead
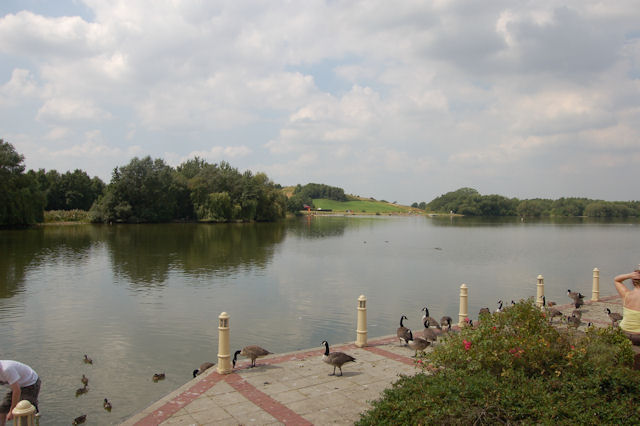
- Looking across the lake.

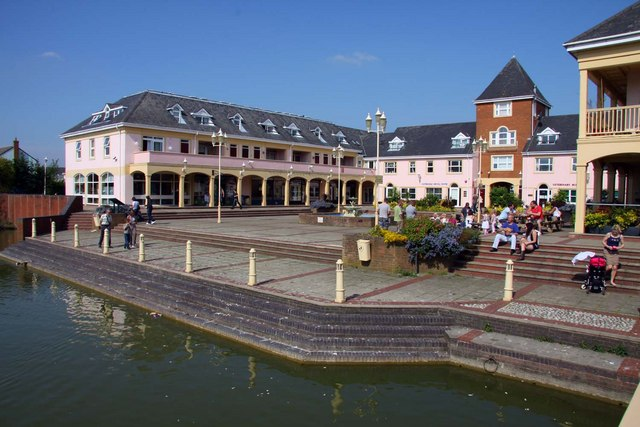
- Watermead

- Location within Buckinghamshire
- Interactive map of Watermead
- Population: 2,343 (2011 Census)
- OS grid reference: SP8215
- Civil parish: Watermead
- Unitary authority: Buckinghamshire
- Ceremonial county: Buckinghamshire
- Region: South East
- Country: England
- Sovereign state: United Kingdom
- Post town: AYLESBURY
- Postcode district: HP19
- Dialling code: 01296
- Police: Thames Valley
- Fire: Buckinghamshire
- Ambulance: South Central
- UK Parliament: Aylesbury

Watermead is a village situated to the north of Aylesbury in Buckinghamshire, England. It is a civil parish and forms part of the Aylesbury Urban Area.

== Housing development ==
Plans for the village of Watermead were first drawn up in the 1980s. The idea was to create a self-contained executive area that would bring new sports facilities and a better quality of housing to the town.

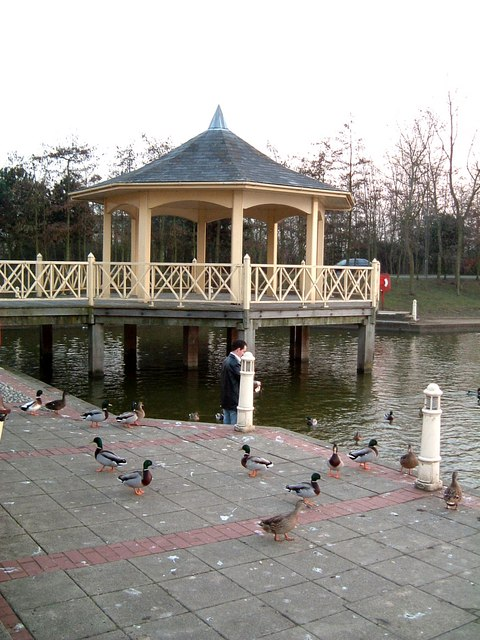
Bandstand with ducks

The village is built on green belt land. At the planning stage the designers were required to pay heed to the ecology of the local area to help protect the environment. Central to the plans therefore was an extensive lake that would become a haven for wildlife and many wild birds.

The water table in the Vale of Aylesbury is higher than the average in England, on account of extensive water reserves that are stored below the clay bed of the whole vale. The designers of the village took this into account by creating a lake in the centre to allow for the rise in water levels. Construction went underway and the first houses were ready for sale in 1986

On the opposite side of the lake from the village was an artificial ski slope. Control over the local water table with flood defences installed and diversions for the River Thame to flood planes on specially dug lakes. The village has grown extensively and has a very active parish council. The ski slope site has been developed and is now Aylesbury Vale Crematorium.

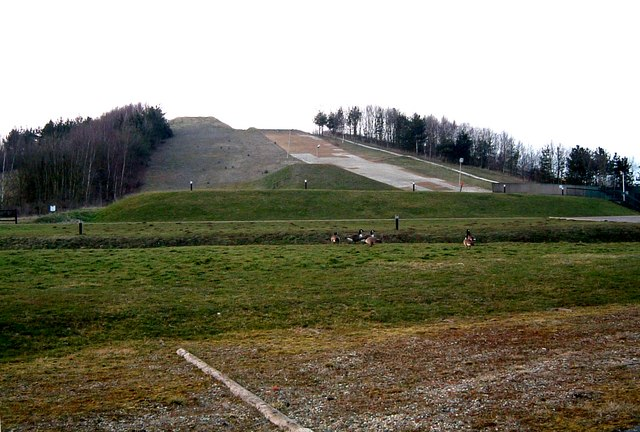
Dry ski slope in Watermead, Aylesbury

Watermead was voted one of the top villages of its type in the country in the early 1990s and won awards for its design and original ideas.

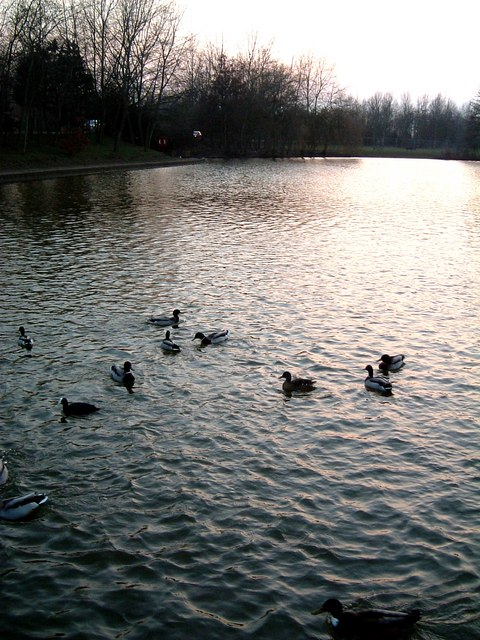
Ducks in the lake during a March sunset.

The original Royco theme was designed by architects John Evennett Associates. Blocks of individual homes were built that made walking through each road (each named after a breed of bird) interesting, although this is something that has been lost since newer building designs were erected around Watermead, but predominantly the existing original Royco village is visible from the approach road, and from over the bridge and across the lake.

== Transport ==
Watermead's closest station is Aylesbury with services to London Marylebone and High Wycombe. Several buses routes connect Watermead to Aylesbury town centre operated by Rainbow Routes, Redline Buses and Arriva.

== Parish Council ==
Watermead parish was established in 2001 and had its first meeting on 18 June of that year.
