= Battle of Chalgrove Field =

First English Civil War, 1643

- Part of the First English Civil War
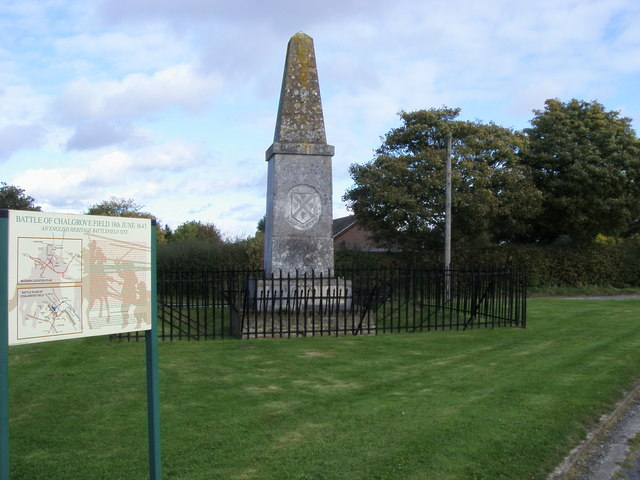
- Monument to John Hampden on the battlefield, erected in 1843
Date	18 June 1643
Location	Chalgrove, Oxfordshire
Result	Royalist victory

Belligerents
Royalists	Parliamentarians

Commanders and leaders
Prince Rupert; Lord Wentworth; William Legge; Sir Henry Lunsford	Sir Philip Stapleton; John Hampden †; John Gunter †; Colonel Dalbier

Strength
1,150 cavalry; 350 dragoons 500 infantry	900 cavalry (200 engaged); 100 dragoons

Casualties and losses
20–45 (estimate)	Max 50, unknown prisoners

The Battle of Chalgrove Field took place on 18 June 1643, during the First English Civil War, near Chalgrove, Oxfordshire. It is now best remembered for the death of John Hampden, who was wounded in the shoulder during the battle and died six days later.

Hoping to capture a Parliamentarian convoy containing £21,000 in cash, during the night of 17 to 18 June Royalist cavalry from Oxford led by Prince Rupert raided positions around Chinnor. Although they failed to intercept the convoy, they seized supplies and prisoners and headed home pursued by cavalry under Hampden and Major John Gunter. Prince Rupert halted at Chalgrove and counterattacked, scattering his opponents before their main force arrived under Sir Philip Stapleton.

The ease with which the Royalists conducted their raid, along with the failure to capitalise on the capture of Reading in April caused serious criticism of the Earl of Essex, Parliamentarian commander. On the other hand, Royalist morale was significantly boosted and Chalgrove marked the start of a series of victories over the next six months.

== Background ==
When the war began, both sides expected it to be decided by a single, decisive battle, but the events of 1642 showed the need to plan for a lengthy conflict. The Royalists focused on fortifying their wartime capital in Oxford and connecting key areas of support in England and Wales, while Parliament consolidated control of those they already held. Although peace talks were held in February, neither party did so with any conviction, and they ended without resolution.

The Earl of Essex, commander of the Parliamentarian field army, captured Reading on 27 April, breaking the line of outposts that protected Oxford. The Royalist war effort was hampered by shortage of weapons, since Parliament held the largest arsenals in England and controlled most of the major ports, making it difficult to import them. In February a large consignment of weapons purchased by Queen Henrietta Maria in the Dutch Republic landed in Bridlington, Yorkshire and preparations began to escort it to Oxford.

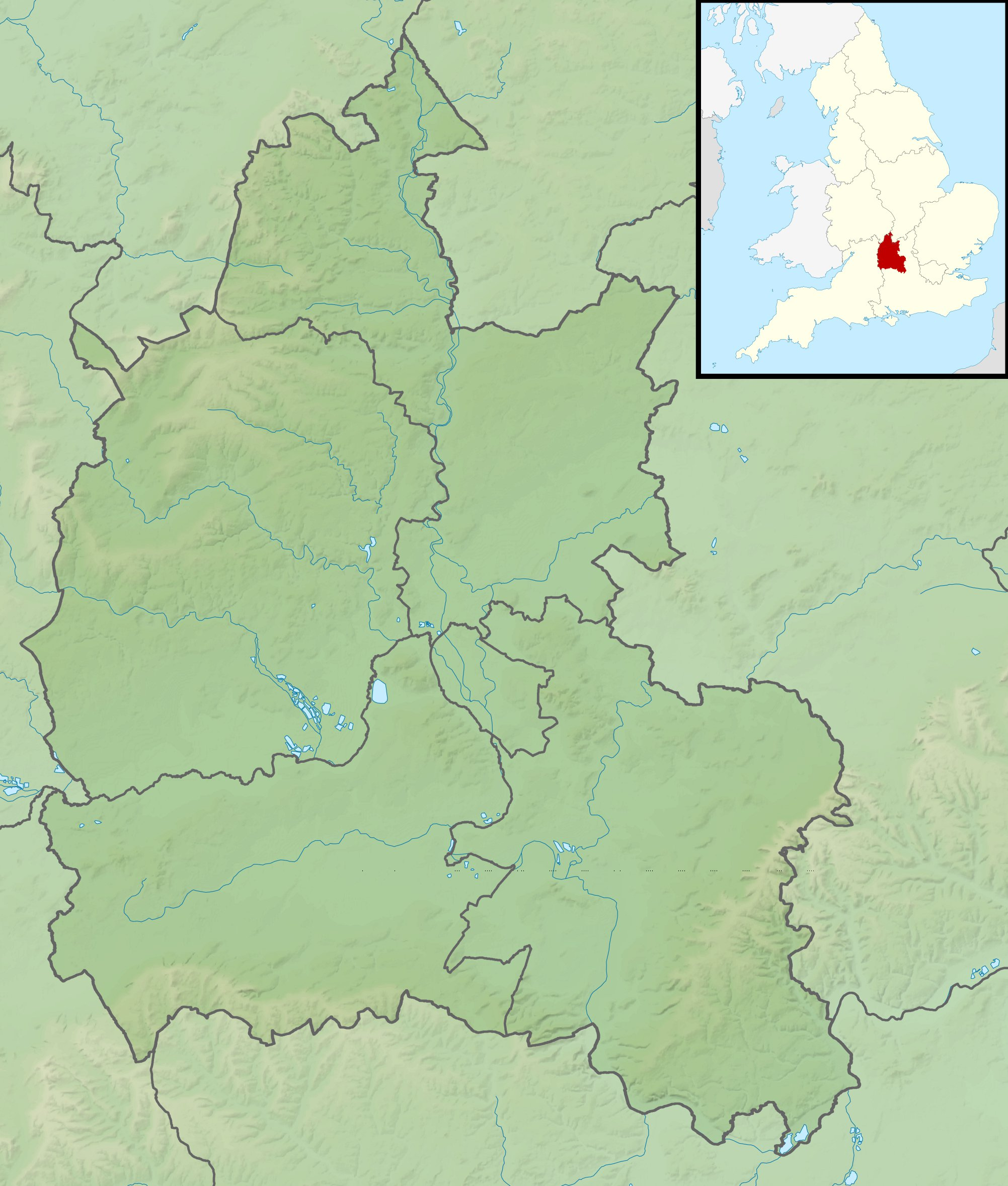
Oxfordshire, June 1643

Pending its arrival, a consignment of gunpowder from York arrived in Oxford on 16 May, escorted by 1,000 troops under Colonel Thomas Pinchbeck. The Royalists were also helped by sickness and hunger among the Parliamentarian troops and the unwillingness of Essex to act aggressively, claiming he could not move without additional supplies and money. This delay allowed the Royalists time to clear a route to Oxford and the arms convoy left York on 4 June, accompanied by the Queen and 5,000 cavalry. Several days later Parliament sent Essex £100,000 worth of supplies from London, including £21,000 in cash to pay the soldiers.

Meanwhile, Royalist cavalry from Oxford conducted a series of raids on local Parliamentarian towns, which Essex failed to prevent. A furious Parliament ordered him to take action and he finally left Reading for Thame on 10 June. The raids were partly intended to distract attention from the Queen's convoy, which reached Newark on 16 June. Hoping to intercept it, on the 17th Essex sent 2,500 men to attack a Royalist outpost at Islip. They found the garrison waiting and retreated; as they did so, Scots mercenary Sir John Urry defected, bringing information on the London convoy and Essex's troop positions.

Seeing an opportunity, Prince Rupert left Oxford at 16:00 the same day, with 1,200 cavalry, 350 dragoons, and 500 infantry. Essex had concentrated his troops in the north, exposing his southern positions; concerned by this, John Hampden checked his pickets with care before going to bed. Many of the troops at Chinnor and Postcombe had just returned from the abortive attempt on Islip, and were exhausted; they failed to post guards, and were taken by surprise when the Royalists attacked at 05:00. Having inflicted 50 casualties, as well as capturing prisoners and stores, Prince Rupert decided to withdraw before his line of retreat was cut; by 06:30, his forces were on the road back to Oxford.

While three troops under Hampden and Major John Gunter maintained contact with the Royalists, the local commander at Thame, Sir Philip Stapleton, hastily pulled together a force to attack them. Several senior officers, supposedly in Thame to collect their regiments' wages, helped him form a number of ad hoc units; having collected around 700 men, Stapleton set out in pursuit.

== Battle ==
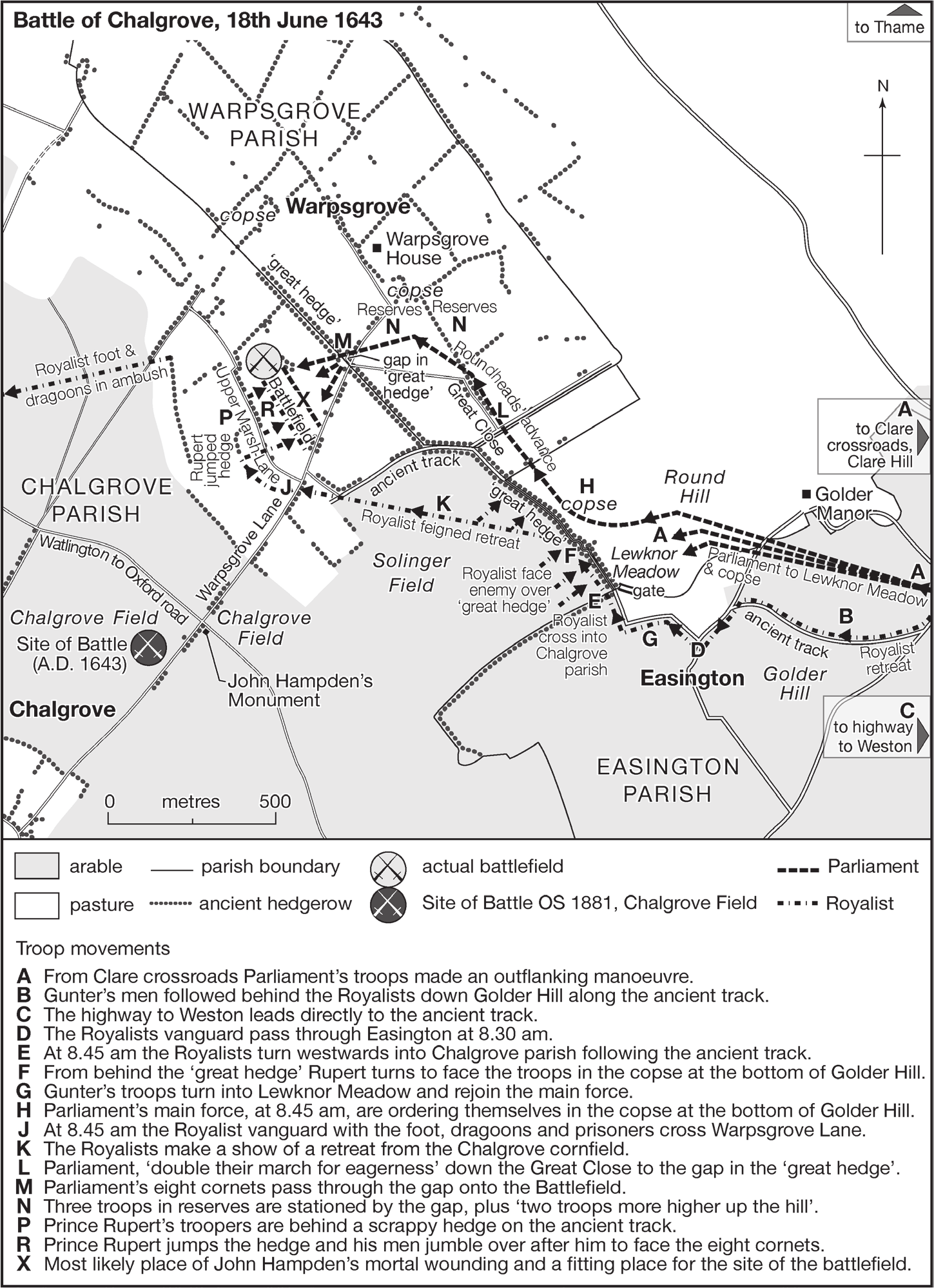
Chalgrove Battle Map

With Lunsford's infantry leading the way, the Royalists made slow progress due to their prisoners and loot, their column spread out along two miles. By 08:30, the rearguard was in contact with Hampden and Gunter, who had been joined by 100 dragoons under Colonel Dalbier, an experienced German mercenary. Realising he could not outrun his pursuers, Rupert ordered Lunsford to keep moving, and secure the bridge at Chiselhampton.

Their route took them along a bridleway, bounded by a 'Great Hedge', a double line of thick, shoulder-high hedgerows used to mark parish boundaries, and prevent cattle straying. With their flanks secured their flanks, the dragoons under Lord Wentworth set up an ambush further along the hedgerow, while Rupert's cavalry formed up in an open field. By now, Parliamentarian forces on the scene consisted of around 200 cavalry, plus the dragoons.

Dalbier moved his dragoons up to the hedge and fired on the Royalist cavalry, prompting Prince Rupert into an attack, allegedly leaping the hedge while the rest of his men made their way around. Reinforced by Hampden and Gunter, Dalbier's men initially held their ground but were heavily outnumbered and broke. For once, Rupert's men halted their pursuit, probably since their horses were exhausted, and withdrew to Chiselhampton, where they remained until the next day. Most accounts agree the fighting was over by the time Stapleton arrived, although it has been suggested otherwise, primarily by Royalist statesman and historian, the Earl of Clarendon.

The idea Parliamentarian losses contained a disproportionate number of senior officers also originates with Clarendon. Total casualties are unclear, partly because contemporary reports often fail to distinguish between those incurred at Chinnor, the skirmish with the rearguard, and the battle itself. The Royalists reported a total of 45 for both sides, Essex suggested 50 each, including Gunter, who was killed close to the hedge. The other significant loss was Hampden, who was wounded twice in the shoulder and died six days later after they became infected; later claims these injuries were caused by the explosion of his own pistol have not been substantiated.

== Aftermath ==
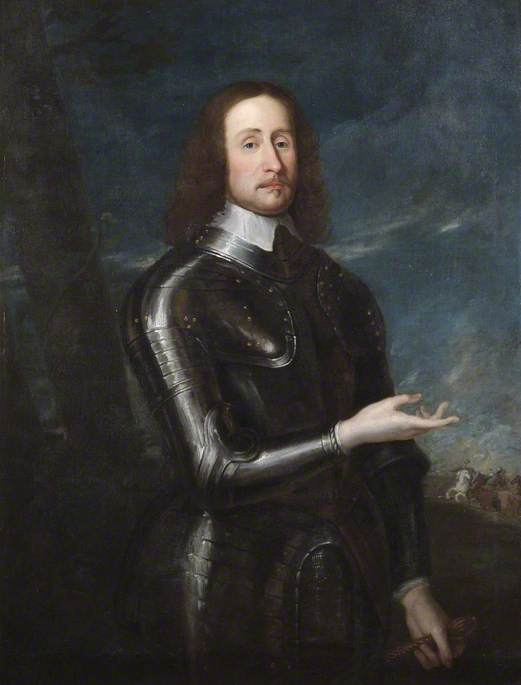
John Hampden; severely wounded in fighting around the hedge, he died six days later

Chalgrove Field cemented Prince Rupert's reputation, emphasising his qualities of drive, determination, and aggression. In only a few hours, he put together nearly 2,000 men, devised a plan, and carried it out, while his aggressive counter-attack kept Stapleton at a distance. It also minimised his weaknesses, one being his cavalry's ill-discipline, which cost the Royalists victory at Edgehill, and led to defeat at Naseby; at Chalgrove, this was limited by their horses being exhausted after a night of hard riding. Capable of inspiring great loyalty among subordinates, like Wentworth and Legge, he was less successful with his peers, the quarrel with Newcastle contributing to defeat at Marston Moor.

It increased discontent with Essex, whose sole achievement in 1643 was to capture Reading; the attack on Islip was slow and ponderous, in contrast to that led by Rupert. Despite warnings of the likelihood of a raid, no precautions were taken, and without Hampden and Gunter, the Royalists would have made it home without being intercepted. The damage to his reputation was sealed when Rupert's men spent the next day at Chalgrove distributing their loot, and preparing for a triumphal entry into Oxford, while the Parliamentarian army looked on.

Chalgrove ended any danger to the Royalist arms convoy, which entered Oxford in early July. More importantly, it established a psychological edge over their opponents, confirmed on 25 June when Urry attacked Wycombe. Essex withdrew from Oxfordshire, allowing Prince Rupert to support operations in the west, culminating in the capture of Bristol on 26 July.

Hampden's death was seen as a major blow; his close friend Anthony Nicholl wrote; 'Never Kingdom received a greater loss in one subject, never a man a truer and more faithful friend.' His reputation and man management skills had been vital in minimising internal divisions, particularly after the exposure of Edmund Waller's Plot on 31 May. Waller had close links to many Parliamentarian leaders, including his cousin, William Waller, and Essex. The death of John Pym in December meant Parliament's two most prominent leaders left the scene in less than six months, during a period of almost unbroken Royalist success.

In 1843, George Nugent-Grenville, a Whig radical politician and author of the hagiographic Memorials of John Hampden, paid for the Hampden Monument, located 700 metres south of the main site. Following an extensive debate over whether it constituted a 'battle' or 'skirmish', English Heritage designated it a registered battlefield in 1995.

== Sources ==
- Adair, John (1979). "The Death of John Hampden". History Today. 29 (10).
- "Battle of Chalgrove". Battlefields Trust.
- Clarendon, Earl of (1704). The History of the Rebellion and Civil Wars in England; Volume II (2019 ed.). Wentworth Press. ISBN 978-0469445765.
- Historic England. "Battle of Chalgrove 1643 (1000006)". National Heritage List for England.
- Historic England. "Hampden Monument (1059742)". National Heritage List for England.
- Lester, Derek; Blackshaw, Gill (2000). The Controversy of John Hampden's Death. Chalgrove Battle Group. ISBN 978-0953803408.
- Lester, Derek; Lester, Gill (December 2015). "The military and political importance of the battle of Chalgrove 1643". Oxoniensia. 80.
- Roberts, Keith; Turner, Graham (2003). First Newbury 1643: The Turning Point (Osprey Campaign). Osprey. ISBN 978-1841763330.
- Royle, Trevor (2004). Civil War: The Wars of the Three Kingdoms 1638–1660 (2006 ed.). Abacus. ISBN 978-0-349-11564-1.
- Spencer, Charles (2007). Prince Rupert: The Last Cavalier. Phoenix. ISBN 978-0297846109.
- Stevenson, John; Carter, Andrew (1973). "The Raid on Chinnor and the Fight at Chalgrove Field". Oxoniensia. XXXVIII. Oxfordshire Architectural and Historical Society.
- Wedgwood, C.V. (1958). The King's War, 1641-1647 (2001 ed.). Penguin Classics. ISBN 978-0141390727.
