= William Urry =

Scottish Royalist officer

Sir William Urry (died 1673–1677) was a Scottish Royalist officer during the Wars of the Three Kingdoms.

== Biography ==
During the Interregnum Sir William joined Charles II in exile. He commanded Lord Newburgh's regiment of Scots at the Battle of the Dunes (1658). After the Restoration he was appointed colonel of the royal guards in Scotland.

== Family ==
Sir William Urry married Jane Scott. Their son, John Urry (1666, Dublin – 18 March 1715, Oxford), was a noted literary editor and medieval scholar.

Sir William's brother, Sir John Urry (or Hurry) (died 29 May 1650), was a professional Scottish soldier who changed sides several times during the Wars of the Three Kingdoms.
