= John Urry (literary editor) =

17th/18th-century Scottish literary editor

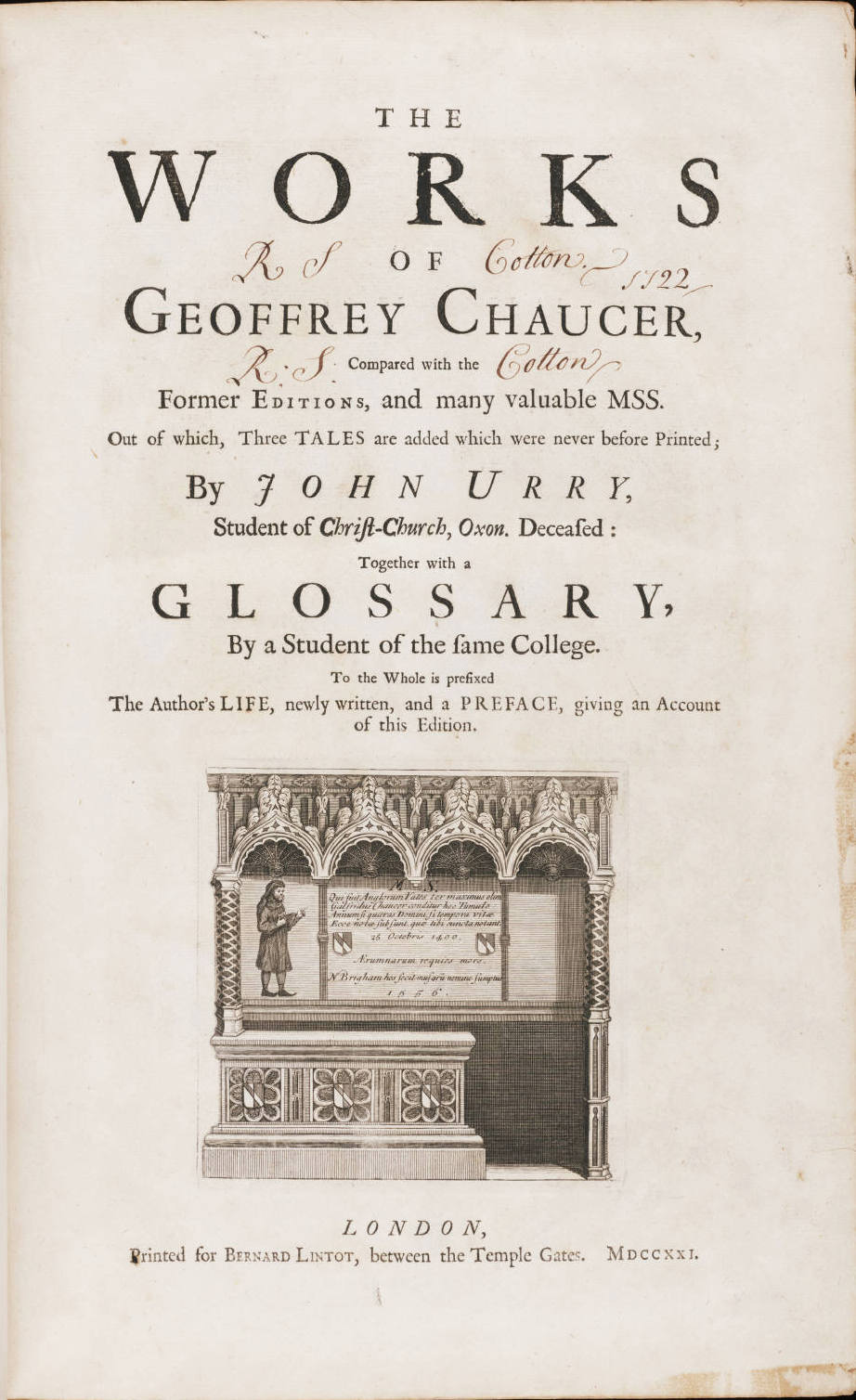
Title page of Urry's edition of Chaucer's works, published posthumously in 1721

John Urry (1666 in Dublin, Ireland – 18 March 1715 in Oxford, Great Britain) was a noted literary editor and medieval scholar of Scottish family.

== Life ==
Matriculating from Christ Church, Oxford on 30 June 1682, he was elected to a studentship. He graduated B.A. in 1686. However (his father William was a major of the royal guards in Scotland at the Restoration, and his uncle John fought on both sides in the Civil War), the younger John Urry fought against Monmouth, and would not swear the oath of allegiance to William III on his accession, thereby losing his studentship.

At the end of 1711, Christ Church's dean Francis Atterbury convinced a reluctant Urry to edit a proposed new edition of the works of Geoffrey Chaucer. Though the work was incomplete on Urry's death 4 years later (he is buried at Christ Church Cathedral, Oxford) and had to be completed and revised by Timothy and William Thomas, Urry's work on it – the first edition of Chaucer to be entirely in Roman type – posthumously made his name.
