= Chearsley =

Village in Buckinghamshire, England

Coordinates: 51.7902°N 0.9617°W

- Location within Buckinghamshire
- Population: 539 (2011 Census)
- OS grid reference: SP715105
- Civil parish: Chearsley
- Unitary authority: Buckinghamshire
- Ceremonial county: Buckinghamshire
- Region: South East
- Country: England
- Sovereign state: United Kingdom
- Post town: Aylesbury
- Postcode district: HP18
- Dialling code: 01844
- Police: Thames Valley
- Fire: Buckinghamshire
- Ambulance: South Central
- UK Parliament: Mid Buckinghamshire

Chearsley is a village and civil parish within the Buckinghamshire district in the ceremonial county of Buckinghamshire, England. It is situated about seven miles south west of Aylesbury, and about four miles north of Thame, in Oxfordshire.

== History ==
The village was mentioned in the Domesday Book of 1086 as Cerdeslai. It was originally a hamlet in the nearby parish of Crendon. It was established as a parish in its own right by the Bishop of Lincoln in 1458.

== Etymology ==
The village name is Anglo Saxon in origin, and means 'Cerdic's clearing' or 'Cerdic's lea'.

=== Elite personal names ===
The incidence of Brittonic personal names in the royal genealogies of a number of "Anglo-Saxon" dynasties is significant. The Wessex royal line was traditionally founded by a man named Cerdic, an undoubtedly Brittonic name ultimately derived from Caratacus. This may indicate that Cerdic was a native Briton, and that his dynasty became anglicised over time.

== Notability ==
The village was used as a location in the ITV television series Midsomer Murders – ep. Country Matters.

== Gallery ==
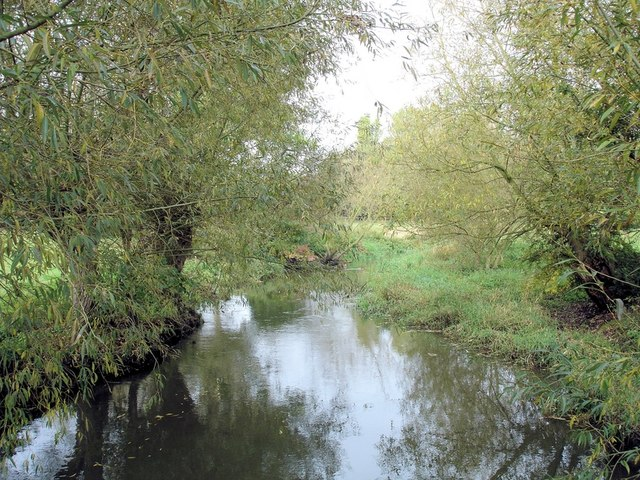
River Thame at Chearsley, view from footbridge at the Cuddington parish boundary.

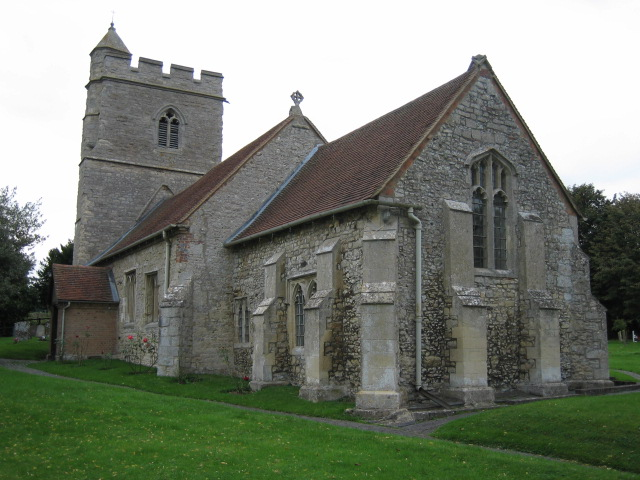
Parish Church of St Nicholas, Chearsley.

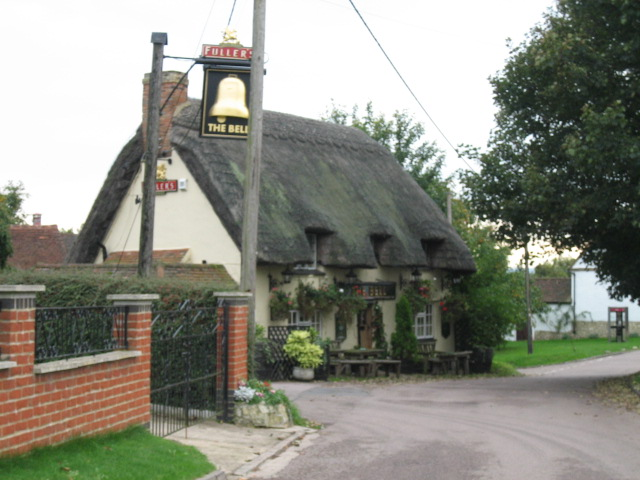
The Bell Inn, Chearsley.

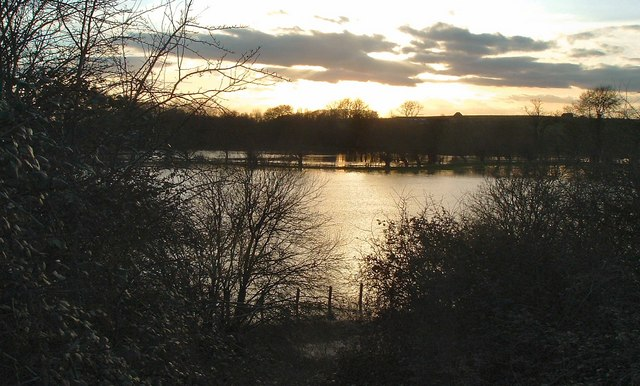
River Thame floods facing Notley from Railway embankment
