= John Urry (soldier) =

Scottish soldier (died 1650)

Sir John Urry
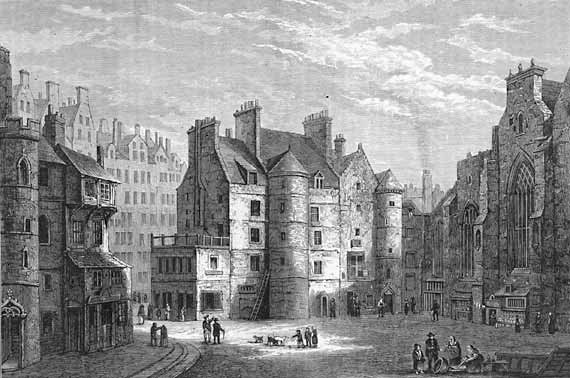
- Old Tolbooth, Edinburgh c. 1750; Urry was executed on the platform at left centre

Personal details
- Born: Pitfichie, Monymusk, Aberdeenshire
- Died: 29 May 1650 Edinburgh
- Cause of death: Beheading
- Occupation: Soldier

Military service
- Years of service: 1639 to 1650
- Rank: Major General
- Battles/wars: Thirty Years War; Wars of the Three Kingdoms; Newburn; Portsmouth; Edgehill; Brentford; Chalgrove Field; Marston Moor; Auldearn; Preston; Carbisdale

Sir John Urry, also known as Hurry, was a Scottish professional soldier who at various times during the Wars of the Three Kingdoms fought for Scots Covenanters, Engagers and Royalists, as well as both English Parliamentarians and Royalists. Captured at Carbisdale in April 1650, he was executed in Edinburgh on 29 May 1650.

== Personal details ==
John Urry was the son of John Urry of Pitfichie near Monymusk, Aberdeenshire, and his wife, Mariora Cameraria or Marian Chamberlain, of Coullie. He had a brother, Sir William Urry, whose son John was a noted literary editor.

== Career ==
Like many Scots of his generation, Urry began his military career in the Thirty Years War, probably with the Swedish army in Germany. He returned home to take part in the 1639 and 1640 Bishops' Wars and was appointed Lieutenant-Colonel of a Covenanter regiment. The Church of Scotland or kirk was a symbol of Scottish independence and like many others, his motives appear to have been primarily patriotic rather than religious.

The war ended with Covenanter victory at Newburn in August 1640 and at the end of 1641, he helped thwart the Royalist plot known as the "Incident". He was rewarded in June 1642 with command of a troop of horse in the army raised by Parliament to suppress the 1641 Irish rebellion. However, before leaving for Ireland, the First English Civil War broke out in August and Urry helped Sir William Waller capture Portsmouth, held by a Royalist garrison commanded by Lord Goring. He subsequently joined the main Parliamentarian army under the Earl of Essex, and fought at the Battle of Edgehill in October and Brentford in November.

John Urry; key locations

In June 1643 he deserted to the Royalist army at Oxford, allegedly when he missed out on promotion. He brought information on a Parliamentarian convoy with £100,000 of cash to pay the troops and joined a force put together by Prince Rupert to capture it. Despite failing to locate the transport, the Royalists seized large quantities of loot and defeated a pursuing force at Chalgrove Field. Urry was rewarded with a knighthood and served under Prince Rupert at Marston Moor in July 1644, where he and Charles Lucas commanded the cavalry on the Royalist left. Although they successfully scattered the Parliamentarian right, it ended in a serious Royalist defeat and in August he defected to the Parliamentarian garrison in Shrewsbury.

He was arrested and sent to London but released when Waller argued his professional expertise was more important than his reliability. Parliament compromised by allowing him to join the Covenanter army in North East England commanded by the Earl of Leven. In February 1645, he returned to Scotland as Major General and served with William Baillie against Montrose in the 1645 Highland campaign.

Although his detached operations were conducted with great skill, an attempt to surprise Montrose at Auldearn in May 1645 failed. As his men moved into position in heavy rain, they fired off their muskets to clear damp powder and the warning allowed the Royalists to launch a devastating counter attack. Urry was one of the last to leave the field but lost nearly half his force and resigned due to ill health. In June 1648, the Covenanter faction known as the Engagers agreed to restore Charles I and entered the Second English Civil War. Urry joined the Scottish army but was captured at Preston in August.

He managed to escape to the Dutch Republic and the exiled court of Charles II, proclaimed King by the Kirk Party after the Execution of Charles I in January 1649. However, this was subject to conditions and since Charles wanted to avoid making any more concessions than absolutely necessary, he looked for alternatives. Encouraged by minor Royalist revolts in Inverness and Atholl, on 20 February 1649 he appointed Montrose Captain General in Scotland, with Urry as his deputy. However, many of his advisors mistrusted Montrose, viewed the attempt as doomed and thus more likely to weaken his position with the Covenanters than strengthen it.

The revolt failed to attract support from within Scotland and ended in defeat at the Carbisdale in April 1650. Montrose and Urry were captured, while Charles was forced to disavow them by the Scottish government; Montrose was executed on 12 May, Urry beheaded outside the Old Tolbooth, Edinburgh on 29th. Historian Trevor Royle suggests "he strove to give his best service to whoever was paying him at the time...but could never decide which side to back, and paid for that failing with his life".

== Sources ==
- Carlyle, Edward Irving (1899). "URRY or HURRY, SIR JOHN" . In Lee, Sidney (ed.). Dictionary of National Biography. Vol. 58. London: Smith, Elder & Co. p. 52.
- Chisholm, Hugh, ed. (1911). "Hurry, Sir John" . Encyclopædia Britannica. Vol. 13 (11th ed.). Cambridge University Press. pp. 959–960.
- Furgol, Edward M. (2004). "Urry [Hurry], Sir John (d. 1650)". Oxford Dictionary of National Biography (online ed.). Oxford University Press. doi:10.1093/ref:odnb/28020. (Subscription, Wikipedia Library access or UK public library membership required.)
- Gentles, Ian (1993). "Why Men Fought in the British Civil Wars, 1639-1652". The History Teacher. 26 (4): 407–418. doi:10.2307/494465. JSTOR 494465.
- Godwin, G.N (1882). The Civil War in Hampshire 1642 to 1645. Elliot Stock.
- Paxton, Edward (1642). A List of the Field-Officers chosen and appointed for the Irish Expedition. HMSO.
- Royle, Trevor (2004). Civil War: The Wars of the Three Kingdoms 1638–1660 (2006 ed.). Abacus. ISBN 978-0-349-11564-1.
- Stevenson, John; Carter, Andrew (1973). "The Raid on Chinnor and the Fight at Chalgrove Field". Oxoniensia. XXXVIII. Oxfordshire Architectural and Historical Society.
