= Chiselhampton =

Village and civil parish in Oxfordshire, England

Coordinates: 51.685°N 1.143°W

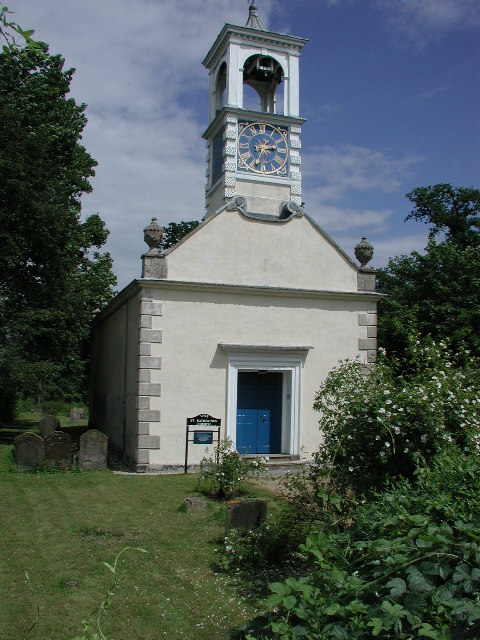
- Saint Katherine's parish church

- Location within Oxfordshire
- OS grid reference: SU5998
- Civil parish: Stadhampton
- District: South Oxfordshire
- Shire county: Oxfordshire
- Region: South East
- Country: England
- Sovereign state: United Kingdom
- Post town: Oxford
- Postcode district: OX44
- Dialling code: 01865
- Police: Thames Valley
- Fire: Oxfordshire
- Ambulance: South Central
- UK Parliament: Henley
- Website: The Parish of Stadhampton.com

Chiselhampton is a village in the civil parish of Stadhampton, on the River Thame, in the South Oxfordshire district, in the county of Oxfordshire, England. It is about 6 miles (10 km) southeast of Oxford. In 1931 the parish named Chislehampton had a population of 136. On 1 April 1932 the parish was abolished and merged with Stadhampton.

== Toponym ==
"Chisel" is derived from the old English ceosel or cisel meaning "gravel" or "shingle", referring to the river gravel beside the Thame on which some of the village is built. In a document dated 1147 the toponym is spelt Chiselentona. Chislehampton came into use later in the same century and was still in use in 1974. A document dated 1517 calls the village Chessyllyngton. It has been colloquially called Chisleton.

== Manors and houses ==
The Domesday Book of 1086 does not mention Chiselhampton by name, but it ascribes a fee of land here to William Fitz-Ansculf of Dudley Castle. For some time thereafter, as Dudley passed to successive families, Chiselhampton remained with the Honour of Dudley. In 1536 the principal manor of Chiselhampton passed to Thomas Doyley of Hambleden in Buckinghamshire. The Doyley family built a substantial house in Chiselhampton, possibly towards the end of the 16th century. Maps of 1628 and 1743 record it as a four-gabled mansion with a large dovecote and an orchard, and an estate plan of 1741–42 shows the house's west front as having eight bays.

Chiselhampton's oldest building is Camoys or Camoise Court, a moated stone-built farmhouse of the 14th century. It was in existence by 1318 when its owner, Sir Richard de Louches of Great Milton, was licensed to crenellate it. The house's name comes from Thomas de Camoys, who acquired it when he married Elizabeth de Louches. Part of the 14th-century building and traces of its moat survive, along with a wing that was added in the 17th century and altered in 1880. At some point the Doyley family, who had bought the main manor in 1748, also acquired the Camoys manor and Camoys Court. Camoys Court is a Grade II* listed building. Several cottages and houses with timber frames and brick infill were built in the 17th century and survive today. They include Chiselhampton's only public house, the 17th-century Coach and Horses Inn.

In the 18th century the Doyley family's wealth declined, so in 1748 Sir Thomas Doyley sold the Chiselhampton and Camoys manors to Charles Peers of Olney, Buckinghamshire, Son of Sir Charles Peers. The combined manor was still with the Peers family in 1958. In the 1740s a surveyor for the Doyleys reported that the late-16th-century mansion was "a very old inconvenient building part brick, part stone" whose outbuildings were ruinous, and concluded that they and the house would "scarce pay for pulling down and yet were not good enough to keep up". Only the dovecote and the walls of the kitchen garden were fit to retain. The Doyleys seem to have lacked the means to rebuild the house, but in 1766 the new owner Charles Peers had a new house designed. In 1768 it was completed on a new site overlooking the River Thame and the old Doyley mansion was demolished.

Peers' Chistleton or Chiselhampton House is a brick Georgian country house of five bays. The exterior is plain but the entrance hall has a fine, curved, cantilevered staircase, galleries at the first and second floors and is lit by a glass umbrella dome. An orangery was added in either 1790 or 1820. In 1820 the house was enhanced with the addition of a number of marble fireplaces and a pilastered entrance porch that the Victoria County History states is Doric but Pevsner and Sherwood state is Ionic. Chiselhampton House is a Grade II* listed building.

== Chapel and parish church ==
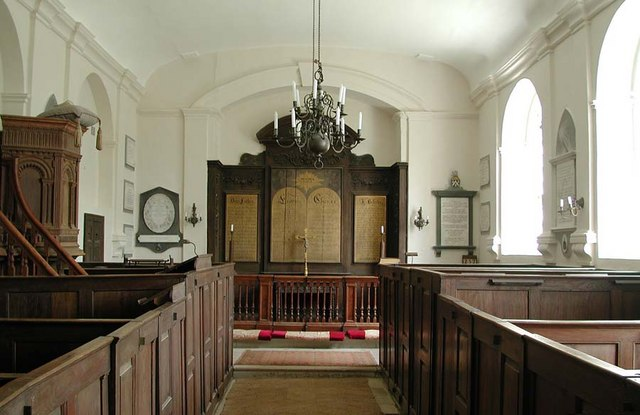
Inside St Katherine's parish church

By 1146 Chiselhampton had a chapel dedicated to Saint Mary. It was a Royal Peculiar of Dorchester Abbey and seems not to have been an independent parish. St Mary's had no graveyard: villagers buried their dead at Stadhampton, which was another of Dorchester Abbey's chapels and Peculiers. St Mary's chapel remained under Dorchester Abbey until the dissolution of the monasteries in 1536, when Stadhampton became a parish separate from Dorchester. Chiselhampton seems then to have become a chapelry of Stadhampton. Despite this new status, until about 1835 clergy for both Chiselhampton and Stadhampton were licensed not by the Bishop of Oxford but by the peculier of Dorchester. After the English Reformation Chiselhampton and Stadhampton always shared the same parish clergy.

Until 1706 St Mary's chapel was reported to be in a good state of repair, but by 1717 the parish curate had taken the villagers to the peculiar court in Dorchester for failing to pay the church rate for the building's upkeep. In 1763 Charles Peers told the court that St Mary's was in "so ruinous and decayed a condition that the inhabitants cannot assemble for worship without manifest hazard [to] their lives", and so he requested permission to demolish the chapel and build a new one. In 1763 Charles Peers had the Medieval chapel demolished and the materials re-used to build a Georgian church on a new site beside the main Oxford - Stadhampton road. That same year it was completed and John Hume, Bishop of Oxford consecrated it. Peers provided the new church with a graveyard to spare villagers from having to bury their dead at Stadhampton. He dispensed with the Norman chapel's dedication to Saint Mary and had the new church dedicated to Saint Katherine. With the new church Chiselhampton was made a parish in its own right, but it continued to share the same parish clergy as Stadhampton.

St Katherine's is a neoclassical building whose architect is unknown. It has a bell-turret and clock over the west door. The interior is fitted with box pews, a west gallery on Tuscan columns, a carved altarpiece and a Jacobean pulpit which is presumed to have been re-used from St Mary's chapel. In 1952–54 the church was restored after an appeal for funds supported by the poet John Betjeman who wrote verses for it and the artist John Piper who repainted the clockface. Concealed electric lighting was installed in the pews in 1956 but St Katherine's is still largely lit by its candle-lit candelabras. The church is a Grade II* listed building. The church has since been made redundant and the ecclesiastical parish reunited with Stadhampton. The civil parishes had already been reunited in 1932. St Katherine's church is vested in the Churches Conservation Trust. Services are still held in St Katherine's three or four times a year, including reenactments of historic Anglican liturgy and west gallery music.

== Bridge and roads ==
Chiselhampton has long been important as a crossing over the River Thame. A bridge has existed since at least 1398, when a presentment complained that "the King's road" at "Cheselhampton Brygwey" was flooded so that "men with horses and carts cannot pass thereby". In 1444 the villagers of Chiselhampton were granted pontage: the right to levy a toll to maintain the bridge. At that time it had timber spans built on stone piers. A 1628 estate map recorded the bridge as "Doyley Bridge". Over the years it has been rebuilt with stone arches, altered by successive repairs, extended, and in 1899 widened with steel troughing. It is now 178 feet (54 m) long and has eight stone arches, of which the southern four are substantially 16th-century.

By the time the English Civil War broke out in August 1642 Chiselhampton was a strongly Puritan community. In November of that year King Charles I withdrew his court to Oxford. Royalist control of the bridges over the River Thame became vital to Oxford's defence, and by March 1643 the Royalists had gated Chiselhampton Bridge and allowed none to cross it "but on market days and sometimes during the daytime". By June 1643 the bridge was reported too damaged for vehicles to use, but still passable on horseback. On the night of 17 June Prince Rupert led about 1,000 cavalry and 800 infantry from Oxford across the bridge to try to capture the payroll of the Parliamentarian army of the Earl of Essex. The payroll evaded capture, but on the morning of 18 June the Prince overpowered Parliamentarian garrisons at Postcombe and Chinnor. The Prince returned his infantry to Chiselhampton to secure the bridge while his cavalry ambushed a pursuing force in a skirmish at Chalgrove Field, mortally wounding one of the Parliamentarian commanders, Colonel John Hampden. The victorious Prince and his force then returned to Oxford over the bridge bringing 120 prisoners, most of them from Chinnor.

After the English Civil War the damage to the bridge was repaired. Its west face and parapet are 20th-century, from when the bridge was widened. The bridge is a Scheduled Ancient Monument. Historically the Oxford–Stadhampton main road has been called Oxford Lane where it passes through Chiselhampton. In 1664 John Doyley was licensed to divert part of the road to make room for him to enlarge his mansion. In the village it is joined by a road from Clifton Hampden. This forms part of the route between Abingdon and Stadhampton and historically in Chiselhampton it has been called Abingdon Lane. Both roads are shown on estate maps dated 1628 and 1743. The name of the Coach and Horses public house suggests that the main road may have been a stagecoach route, but there is no evidence that either road was ever a turnpike. Since the early 1920s the main road has been classified B480 and the Clifton Hampden road has been classified B4015.

== Air crash ==
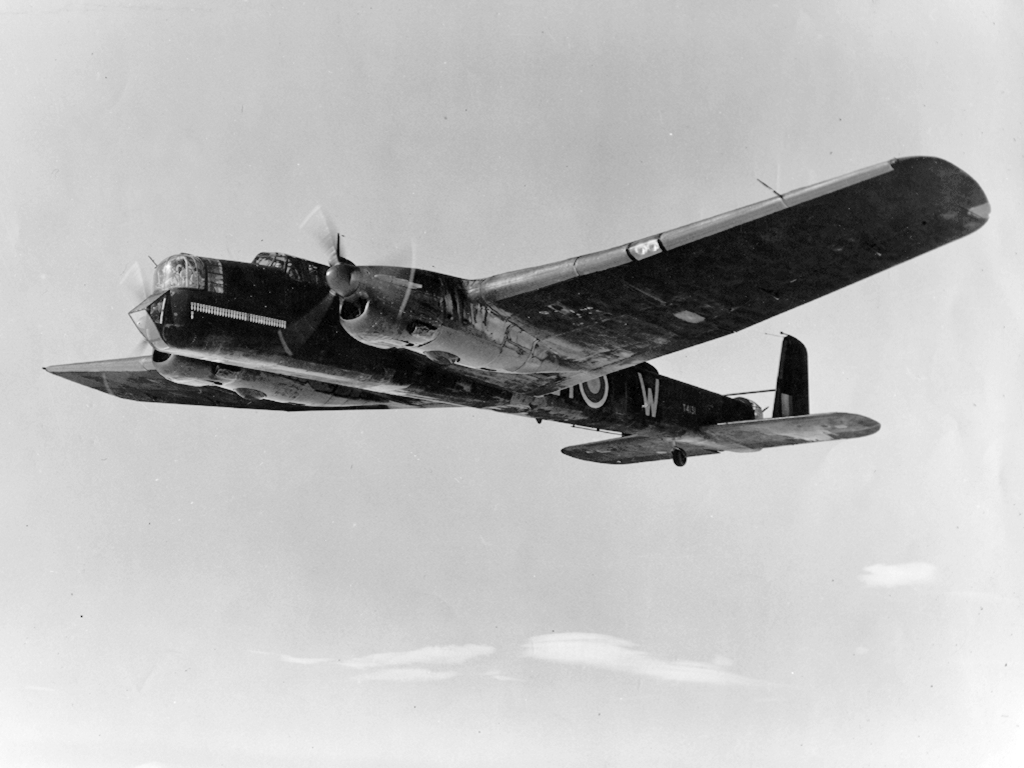
Armstrong Whitworth Whitley V similar to Z6667, which crashed on Chiselhampton Hill

On 5 July 1941 an Armstrong Whitworth Whitley V bomber aircraft, Z6667 of No. 10 Operational Training Unit RAF based at Abingdon, was on a night training flight when it broke up over Oxfordshire, crashed on Chiselhampton Hill and caught fire on impact. The crash was variously attributed to either a Luftwaffe night fighter or friendly fire by a local anti-aircraft unit. All six crewmen were killed. The pilot, RAF Flt Sgt AEW Lynch, is buried at Heston in Middlesex. Three of his crew were members of the Royal Canadian Air Force. Two are buried at Brookwood Cemetery in Surrey, and the other is buried at Tomnahurich in Inverness-shire. The other two crewmen were members of the Royal Air Force Volunteer Reserve. They are buried at Acklam and Cottingham in Yorkshire

== See also ==
- Clifton Hampden, where a USAAF Lockheed P-38F Lightning crashed in 1944, killing its pilot
- Little Baldon air crash, in which an RAF Handley Page Hastings on a parachute training flight from RAF Abingdon crashed in 1965, killing all 41 people aboard

== Sources ==
- Jervoise, Edwyn (1932). The Ancient Bridges of Mid and Eastern England. Vol. III. Westminster: The Architectural Press for the SPAB. pp. 151–152.
- Lobel, Mary D, ed. (1962). A History of the County of Oxford. Victoria County History. Vol. 7: Thame and Dorchester Hundreds. London: Oxford University Press for the Institute of Historical Research. pp. 5–16, 81–92.
- Sherwood, Jennifer; Pevsner, Nikolaus (1974). Oxfordshire. The Buildings of England. Harmondsworth: Penguin Books. pp. 541–543. ISBN 0-14-071045-0.
- Wood, Andrew (5 June 2002). "Interview with Charles Peers, farmer". AgriCultured Farming lives, past and present. (a descendant of the first Charles Peers)
