= Benson Lock =

Lock on the River Thames in Oxfordshire, England

Coordinates: 51.61631°N 1.11748°W

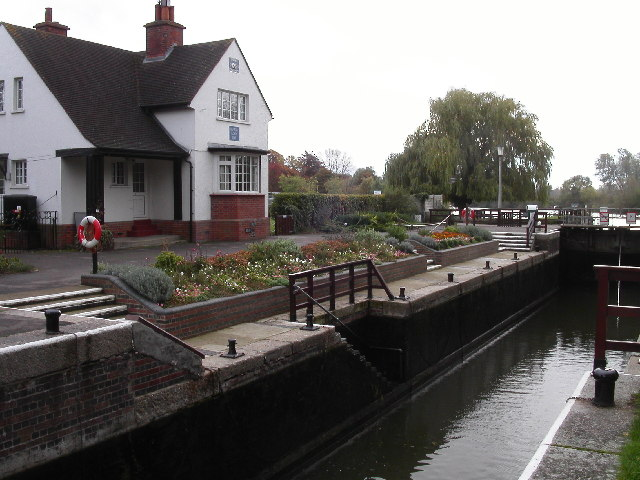
- The keeper's house and lock at Benson Lock
- Interactive map of Benson Lock
- Waterway: River Thames
- County: Oxfordshire
- Maintained by: Environment Agency
- Operation: Hydraulic
- First built: 1788
- Latest built: 1870
- Length: 40.56 m (133 ft 1 in)
- Width: 5.46 m (17 ft 11 in)
- Fall: 1.87 m (6 ft 2 in)
- Above sea level: 144'
- Distance to Teddington Lock: 72 miles

Benson Lock is a lock on the River Thames in England, close to Benson, Oxfordshire but on the opposite bank of the river. The first pound lock here was built by the Thames Navigation Commission in 1788 and it was replaced by the present masonry lock in 1870. The distance between Benson Lock and Cleeve Lock downstream is 6.5 miles (10.4 km) - the longest distance between locks on the River Thames.

The weir runs from the lock island level with the lock across to the Benson side. There is a footbridge over the weir which replaced the ferry which operated here previously. The Thames Path crosses the river here.

== History ==
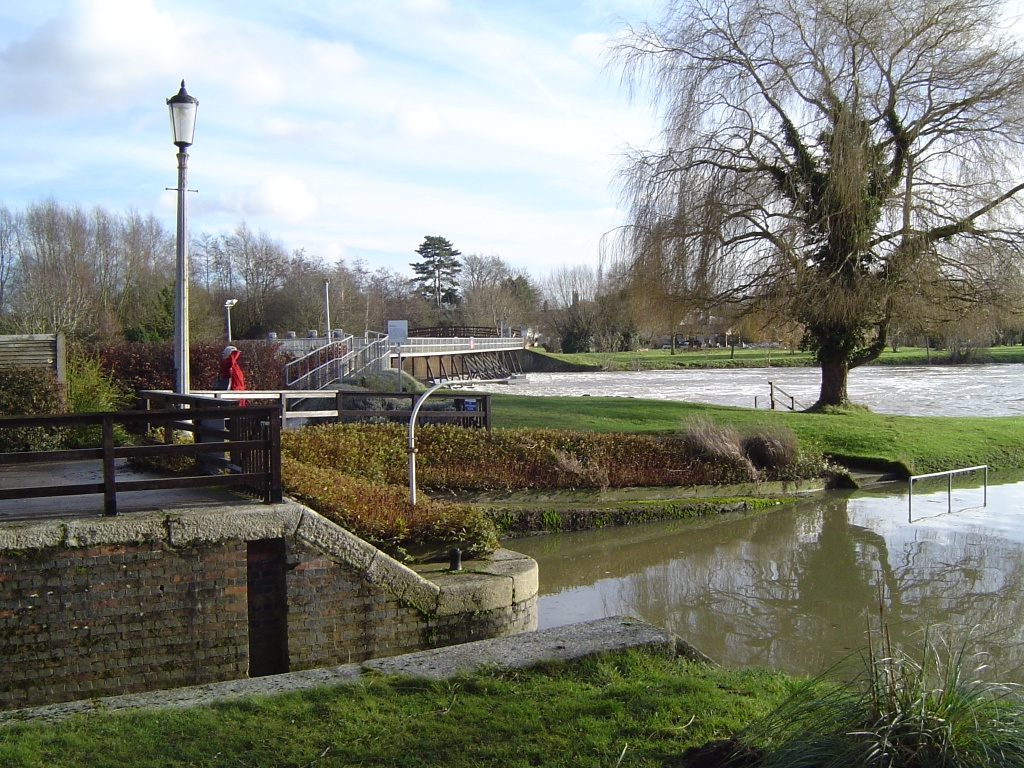
Walkway across Benson Weir (river in full spate)

The history of the weir can be traced back into the late 14th century when there was a mill at "Bensington". The mill island and stream are on the Benson side downstream of the lock although the mill itself is long gone. There was also a flash lock, although the first definite reference to this is in 1746. The pound lock was built of oak in 1788 and it is noted that, uniquely for this lock, "Low Country men" were employed at a higher than average wage. Thacker conjectures that these were Dutch specialists. The lock was rebuilt of masonry in 1870. Originally the lock was attended (or not - according to some accounts) by the miller, but there is reference to a (deserted) lock house in 1865. The present lock keeper's house dates from 1913.

== Access to and across the lock ==
The lock is a short distance from the village of Benson and can be reached across the weir. The weir was recently closed for refurbishment but reopened in April 2026.

== Reach above the lock ==
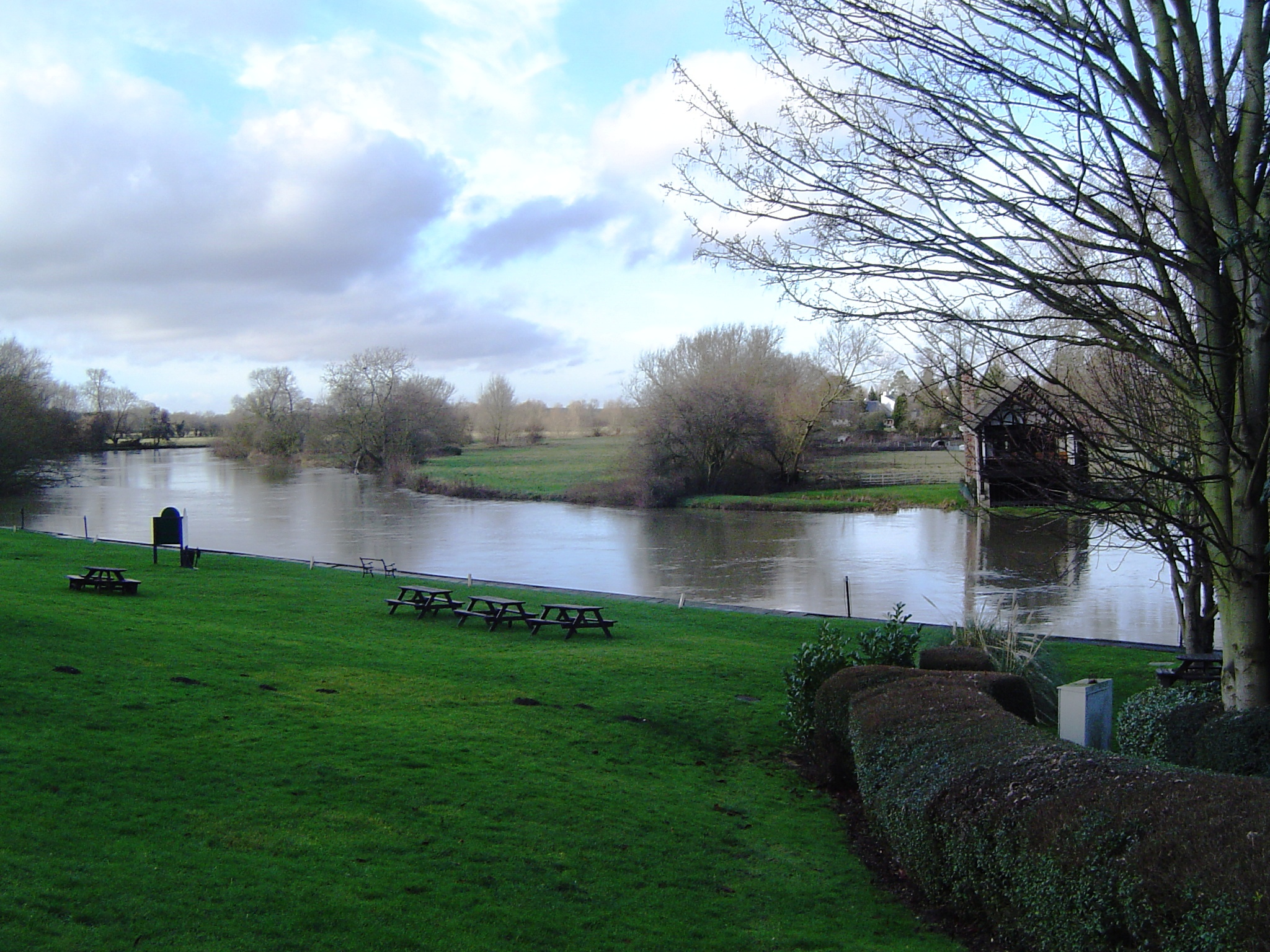
Winter view of the river upstream from Shillingford

About halfway along the reach, the river passes through Shillingford and under Shillingford Bridge, which is built of limestone ashlar masonry with some brick. The central section over the river consists of three segmental arches, and there is a long causeway to the north with nine additional arches. The structure is grade II listed. For a great part of the way the two round topped hills of the Wittenham Clumps are in view. After Shillingford the River Thame enters the river from the direction of Dorchester which is a short way to the north. The Thame is navigable by small boats as far as Dorchester Bridge, on the south-east edge of Dorchester.

The Thames Path, which crosses the river at the lock, follows a road in Benson and rejoins the river, running along the northern/eastern bank to Shillingford. At Shillingford the path follows a diversion through the town, rejoining the river outside the town. It continues on the northern bank, over the River Thame to Little Wittenham Bridge where it crosses just before Day's Lock.

== See also ==
- Locks on the River Thames
- Crossings of the River Thames

== Bibliography ==
- Cumberlidge, Jane (2009). Inland Waterways of Great Britain (8th Ed.). Imray Laurie Norie and Wilson. ISBN 978-1-84623-010-3.
- Nicholson (2006). Nicholson Guides Vol 7: River Thames and the southern waterways. Harper Collins. ISBN 978-0-00-721115-9.

Next lock upstream	River Thames	Next lock downstream
Day's Lock; 3.96 mi (6.37 km)	Benson Lock; Grid reference: SU612912	Cleeve Lock; 6.50 mi (10.46 km)
Next crossing upstream	River Thames	Next crossing downstream
Shillingford Bridge	Benson Lock	Wallingford Bridge
Next crossing upstream	Thames Path	Next crossing downstream
northern bank Day's Lock	Benson Lock	southern bank Goring and Streatley Bridge
