= Day's Lock =

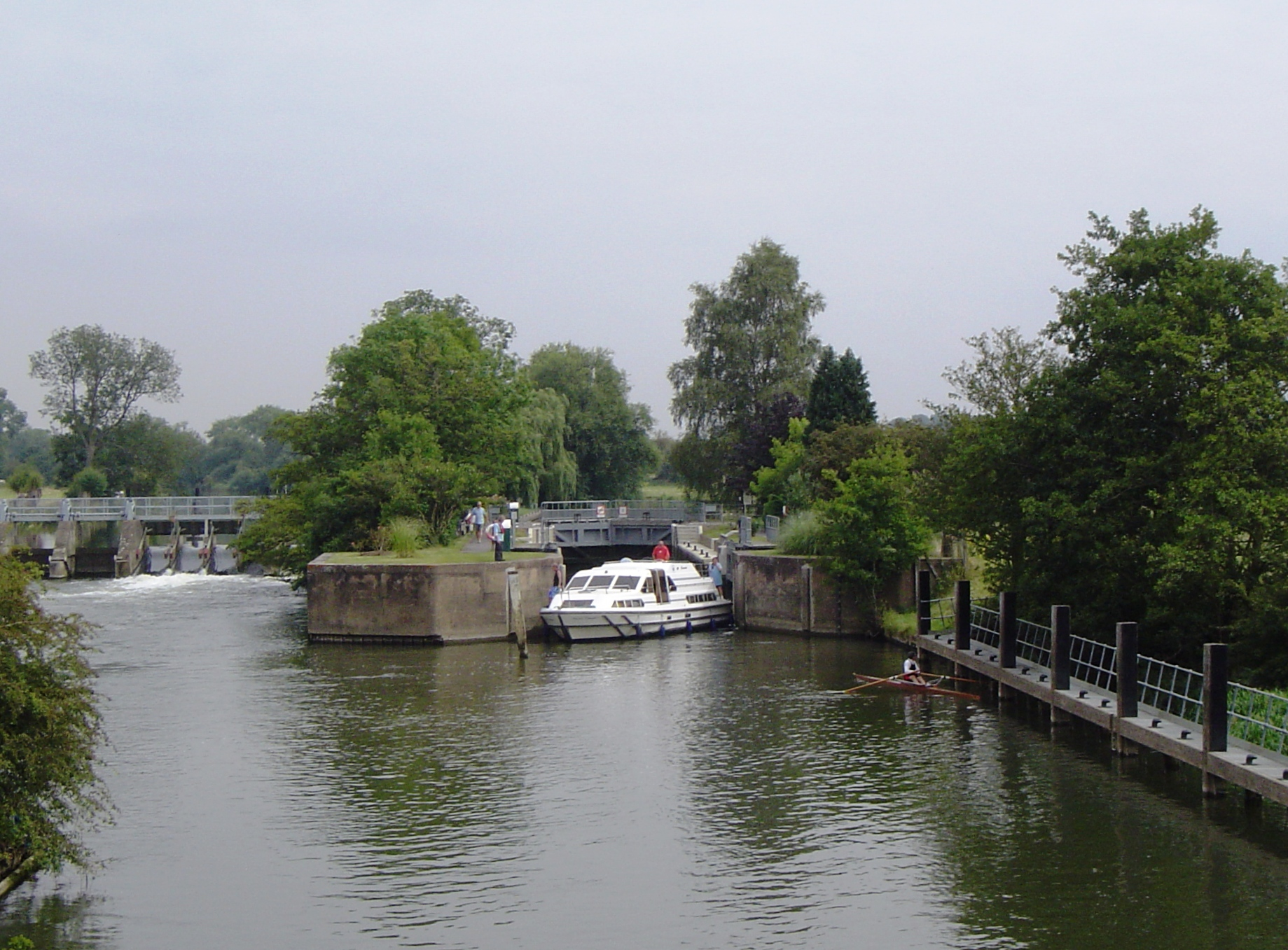
- Sculler waits to enter Day's Lock while a cruiser tries to come out sideways
- 51.63834°N 1.17919°W
- Waterway: River Thames
- County: Oxfordshire
- Maintained by: Environment Agency
- Operation: Hydraulic
- First built: 1789
- Latest built: 1925
- Length: 46.93 m (154 ft 0 in)
- Width: 6.45 m (21 ft 2 in)
- Fall: 1.58 m (5 ft 2 in)
- Above sea level: 149'
- Distance to Teddington Lock: 76 miles

Day's Lock is a lock on the River Thames near Dorchester-on-Thames, Oxfordshire, England on the Dorchester side of the river.

The pound lock was built in 1789 by the Thames Navigation Commissioner. The lock is across the river from the small village of Little Wittenham and is overlooked from the south by the hills of Wittenham Clumps, with a particularly good view from Round Hill.

The weir runs straight across the river from the other side of the lock island.

Day's Lock is the main gauging station for the measurement of the water flow in the River Thames.

The Thames Path crosses the river here.

The World Poohsticks Championships, on behalf of the RNLI, have taken place annually here since 1983.

== History ==
The name Day's Lock comes from the Day family, local Catholic yeomen since the 17th century. During the 16th century, there was a flash lock here. The pound lock was staked out in August 1788. It was judged best to build it on the Oxfordshire bank provided the existing weir owner would "remove his bucks"(eel traps). In 1865 it was reported to be in utter ruin and dangerous, but reconstruction did not take place until 1871. In 1882 a bell push to summon the keeper was installed, there being no lock keeper's house at that time. The lock house was not built until 1928 when it was erected on Lock House Island next to Little Wittenham Bridge.

== Access to the lock ==
A short way downstream of the lock is Little Wittenham Bridge which spans the river in two sections with an island between. Using this, the lock is a short walk from Little Wittenham where is a car park near St Peter's Church. The car park generally has spaces available. The lock is a little further to walk to from Dorchester.

== Reach above the lock ==
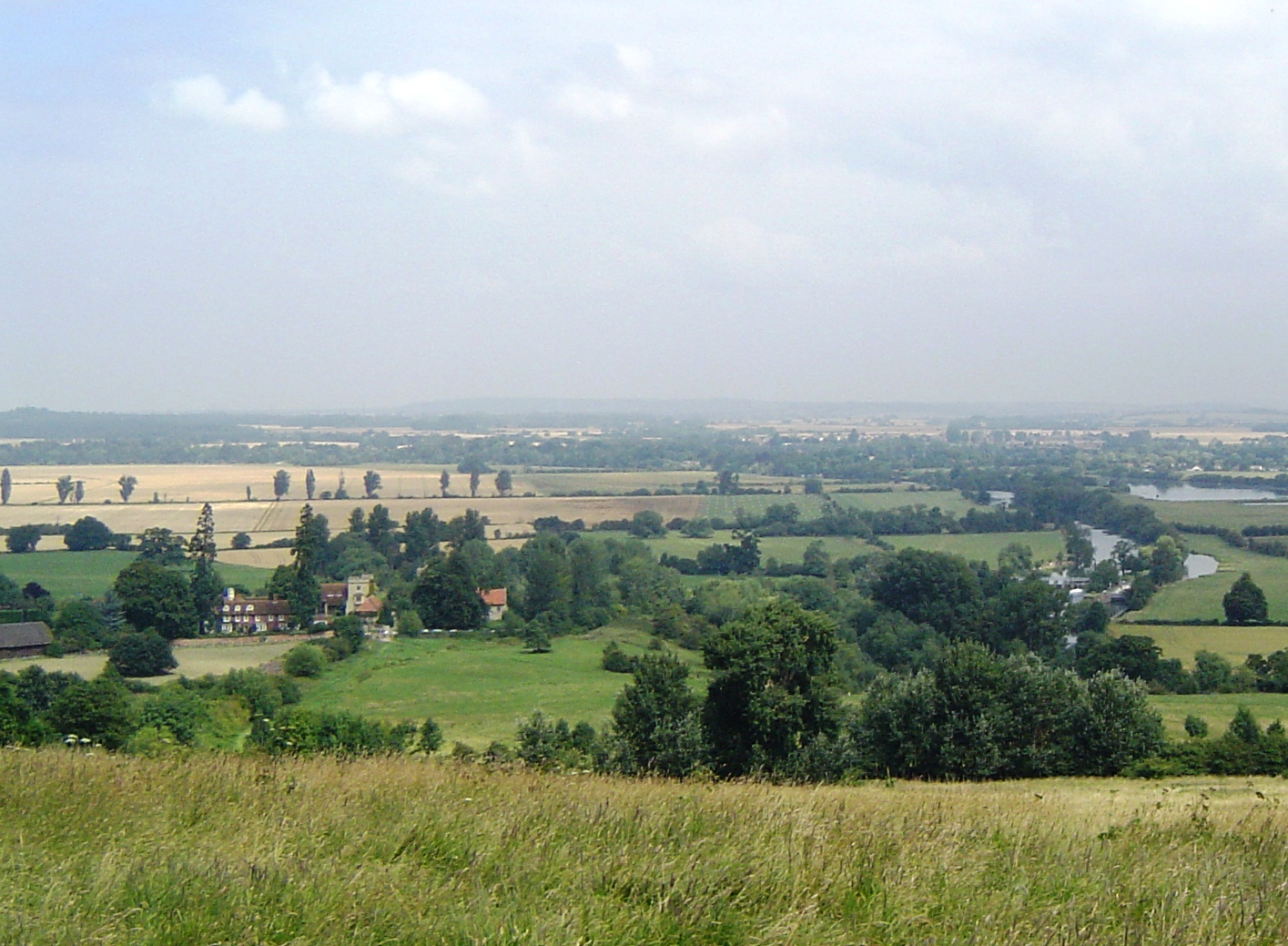
View from Round Hill. Day's Lock and the River Thames curving along the tree line to the left

On the eastern bank to the north-east is the historic town of Dorchester with its ancient Abbey. The river follows a long bend round to Clifton Hampden. Here it goes under Clifton Hampden Bridge and past the historic Barley Mow public house, as mentioned in the book, Three Men in a Boat. After the bridge and before Clifton lock, the river divides between the old river course, past Long Wittenham; with the navigation following the Clifton Cut. The river meander is now a weirstream and has almost no public footpath access.

The Thames Path follows the western/southern bank to Clifton Hampden Bridge, where it crosses to the opposite northern bank to continue to Clifton Lock.

There are navigation transit markers upstream of the lock to allow boats to check their speed. A powered boat should take more than one minute to pass between the markers.

== See also ==
- Locks on the River Thames
- List of crossings of the River Thames

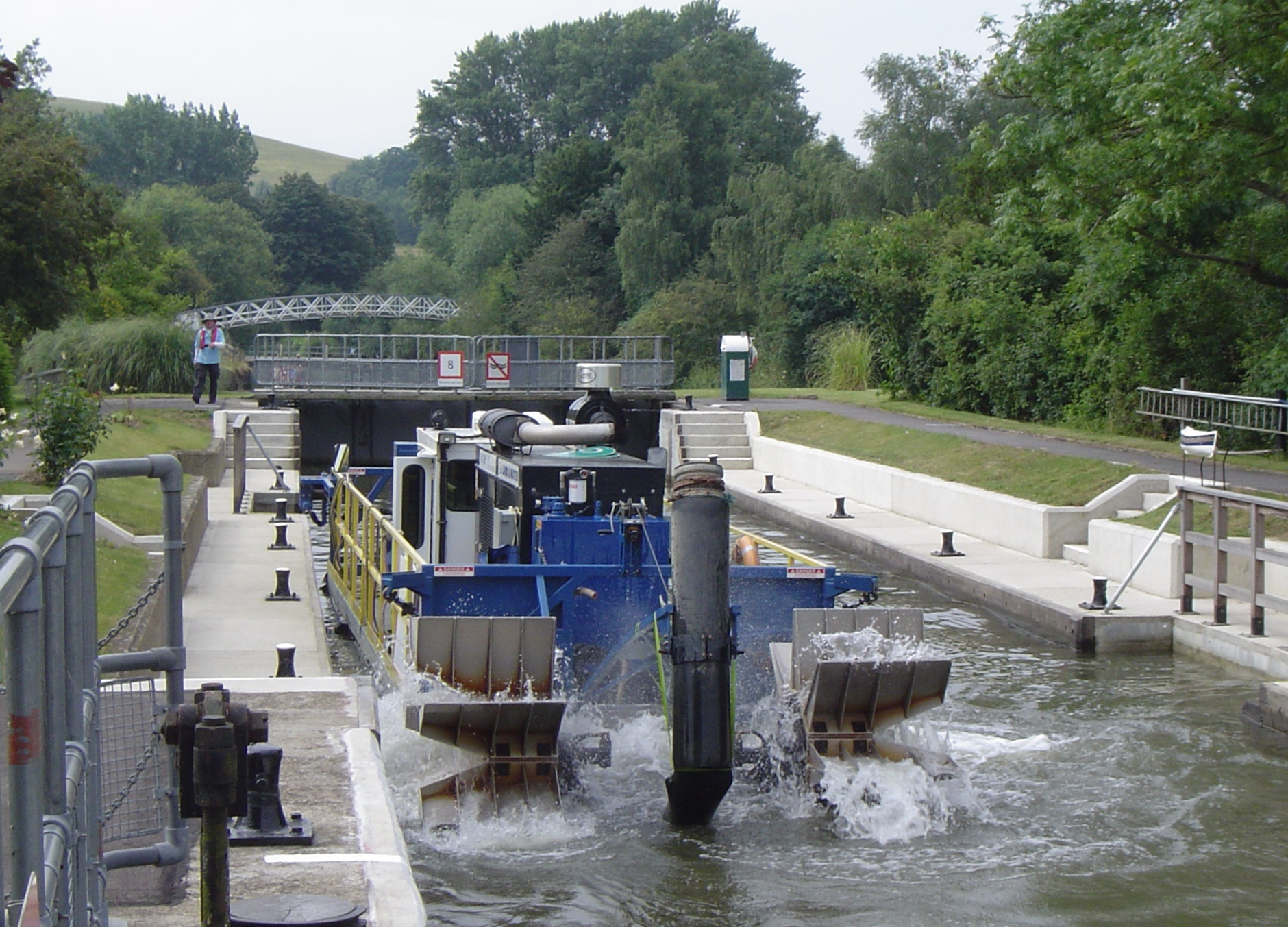
A paddle-driven river management craft enters the lock from upstream. Round Hill and Little Wittenham Bridge are in the background

Next lock upstream	River Thames	Next lock downstream
Clifton Lock; 4.80 km (2.98 mi)	Day's Lock; Grid reference SU569936	Benson Lock; 6.37 km (3.96 mi)
Next crossing upstream	River Thames	Next crossing downstream
Clifton Hampden Bridge (road)	Day's Lock	Little Wittenham Bridge (pedestrian)
Next crossing upstream	Thames Path	Next crossing downstream
southern bank Clifton Hampden Bridge	Day's Lock	northern bank Benson Lock
