= Little Wittenham Bridge =

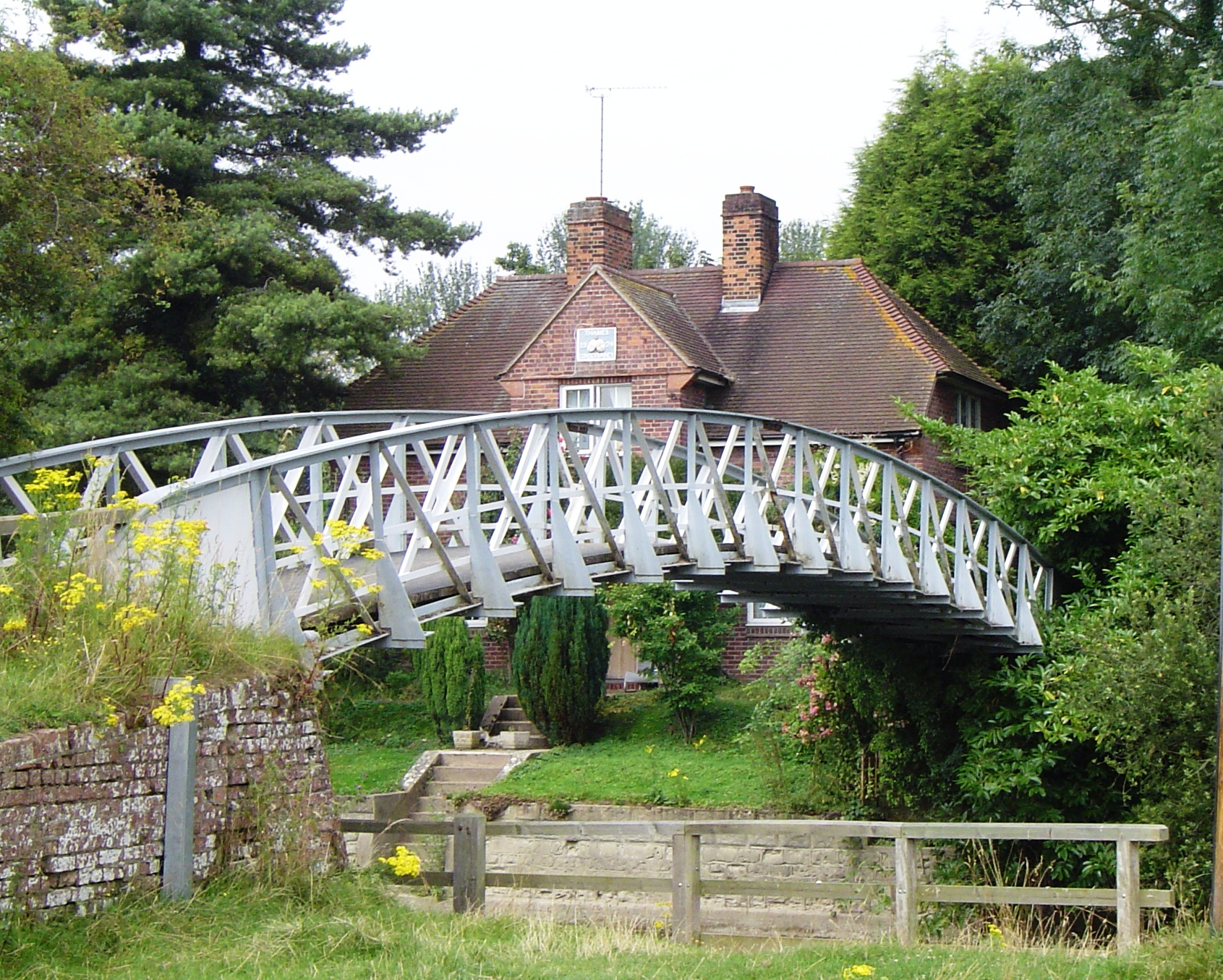
- Little Wittenham Bridge
- Coordinates: 51.637395°N 1.179806°W
- Carries: Footpath
- Crosses: River Thames
- Locale: Dorchester-on-Thames, Oxfordshire

Characteristics
- Design: Arch
- Material: Iron and wood
- Height: 15 feet 3 inches (4.65 m)

Location
- Interactive map of Little Wittenham Bridge

Little Wittenham Bridge is a footbridge across the River Thames in England near Dorchester-on-Thames, Oxfordshire. It is just downstream of Day's Lock on the reach above Benson Lock and connects Little Wittenham to Dorchester.

The bridge spans the river in two sections with Lock House Island in between. The lock house, built in 1928 is situated on the island.

Until 2018, the bridge was one of two used in the World Poohsticks Championships for the heats, and was used as the bridge for the final of the event.

== See also ==
- Crossings of the River Thames

Next crossing upstream	River Thames	Next crossing downstream
Day's Lock (pedestrian)	Little Wittenham Bridge	Shillingford Bridge (road)
