= Shillingford Bridge =

Bridge in Shillingford, England

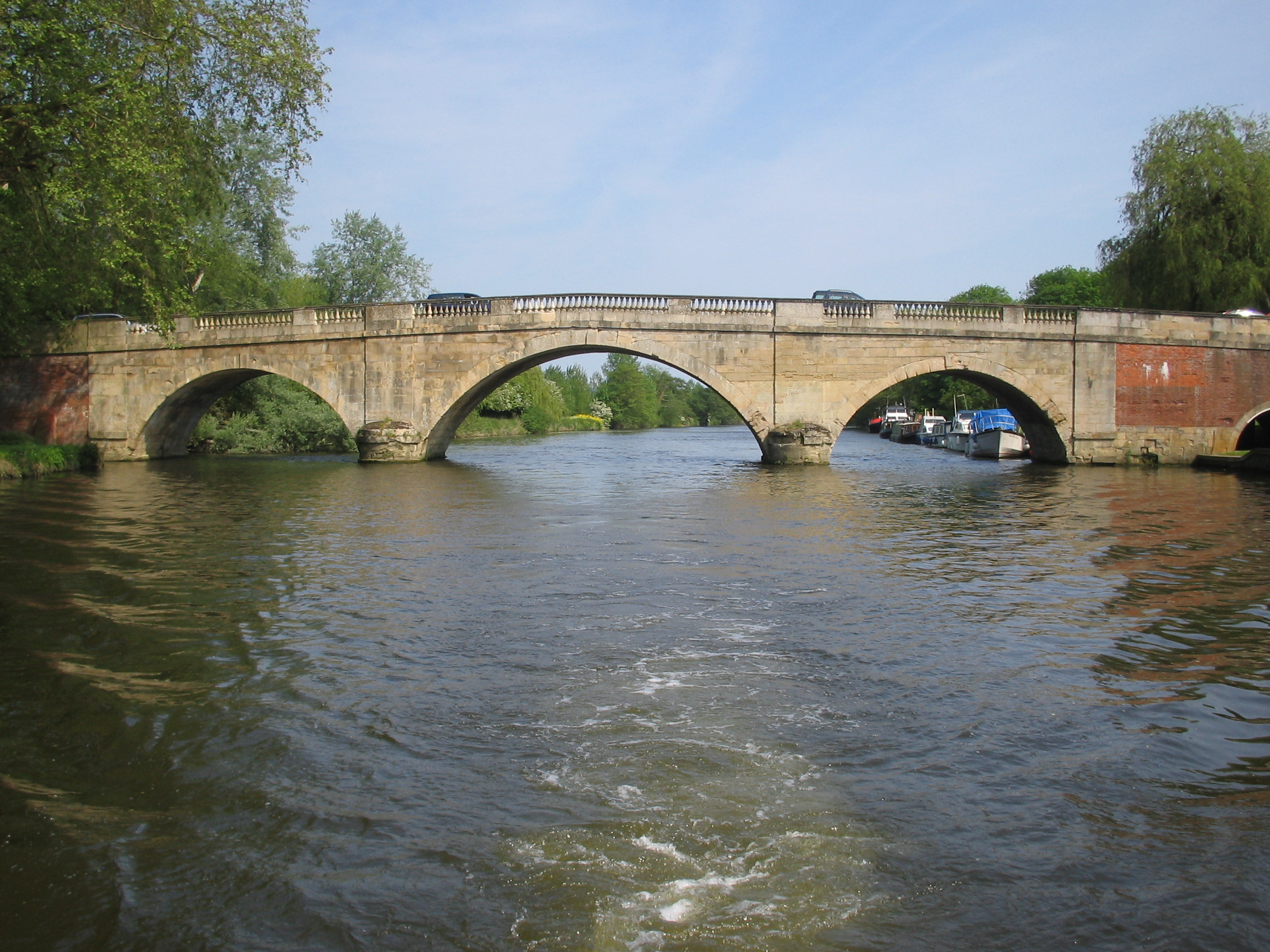
- Shillingford Bridge looking downstream
- Coordinates: 51°37′27″N 1°08′22.5″W
- Carries: Unclassified road
- Crosses: River Thames
- Locale: Shillingford, Oxfordshire
- Maintained by: Oxfordshire County Council

Characteristics
- Design: arch
- Material: Stone

History
- Opened: 1767 (present structure 1827)

Location
- Interactive map of Shillingford Bridge

Shillingford Bridge is Grade II* listed road bridge near Shillingford, Oxfordshire, carrying an unclassified road (formerly the A329 road) across the River Thames in England on the reach above Benson Lock. The bridge provides access between Shillingford to the north of the river and Wallingford to the south. Originally the south side was in Berkshire but was transferred from Berkshire to Oxfordshire in 1974. The bridge is single track and vehicular passage is controlled by traffic lights.

There are records which suggest the presence of a bridge on the site in the 14th century but this structure was short-lived and crossing was made by ferry from at least 1379 until a timber bridge was built in 1767. The present stone structure dates from 1827. A toll was payable on both the ferry and the subsequent bridges until 1874 when the county councils of Berkshire and Oxfordshire joined to buy the bridge from its private trustees and scrapped the charges.

== Background ==
Shillingford Bridge occupies a romantic position, which strikes the eye more strongly from being unlike the rest of the country, which bears an open and dreary aspect.

— The Beauties of England and Wales 1813

In the Patent Rolls of 1301 the Earl of Cornwall is recorded as leasing a fishery "downstream of Shillingford Bridge" and in 1370 a bridge at Shillingford is mentioned again as a boundary of another fishery. This however is the last mention of a bridged crossing on the site until 1763. It is unusual for a bridge to completely disappear but the probable explanation is that the governor of Wallingford Castle had a small wooden bridge built to give pedestrians and horsemen easy passage to Dorchester Abbey but later had it removed due to security concerns for the royal castle. There is no doubt that a bridge did exist as Gough's Camden (1789) records that piles and beams were dredged up at the site of Shillingford Ferry.

The medieval bridge had almost certainly been dismantled by 1379 when Shillingford Ferry was granted for life to Roger Hurst, Porter of Wallingford Castle. The ferry remained as a perquisite of the castle's porters until 1530 when it was leased to Roger Hacheman for 33s 4d per annum. Hacheman also leased a small dwelling on what was then the Berkshire (south) bank in 1545, the dwelling, rebuilt and expanded several times, was known as the Swan Inn by 1608 and is now the Shillingford Bridge Hotel. Thomas Baskerville's travel journal of 1692 reports "At Shillingford a great barge to waft over carts, coaches, horse and man".

== 1767 bridge ==
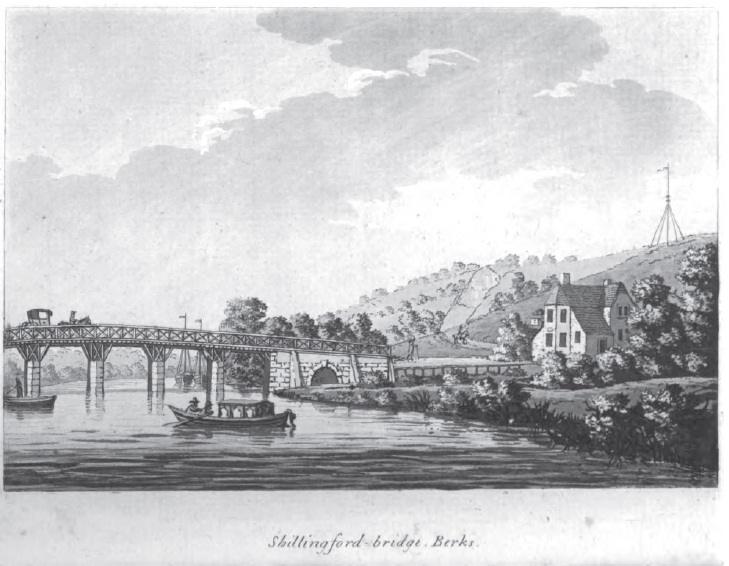
The 1767 bridge captured by Samuel Ireland in 1791

In 1749 William Blackstone became Recorder of Wallingford. He was a lawyer and frequently used the ferry to travel between Wallingford and Oxford but in times of flood and strong stream he was forced to take a longer route via Wallingford Bridge. Blackstone decided that a bridge was necessary and in November 1763 under his leadership the local gentry petitioned Parliament which led to the Shillingford Roads and Bridge Act 1764 (4 Geo. 3. c. 42), an act of Parliament, in December 1763 "for repairing and widening the Road from Shillingford in the County of Oxford, through Wallingford and Pangbourne to Reading in the County of Berks and for building of a Bridge over the River Thames at or near Shillingford Ferry". The act described the ferry as "dangerous for persons to pass in times of flood". The act created the Shillingford to Reading Turnpike Trust, with powers to improve and maintain the existing road and to take responsibility for building the new bridge. Over 100 Berkshire and Oxfordshire landowners were trustees, including Viscount Fane, Lord Charles Spence and the Honourable Peregrine Berie who were all named in the act of Parliament.

Work on the bridge did not begin until 1766 when stone foundations, piers and abutments were built supporting a wooden trestle road bed. Completion of the bridge was announced in the Reading Mercury in April 1767. Jackson's Oxford Journal gives the precise opening date as 25 April 1767 and records that the bridge was "fenced with a neat Chinese Railing". The turnpike trust took a loan of £7,700 (equivalent to £1,160,000 today) which covered both the cost of purchasing the ferry rights and the construction of the bridge. As well as a toll-gate on the bridge, the trust also collected tolls at gates situated at Winterbrook and Pangbourne Lane; however, the bridge yielded the highest income of all even though the bridge tolls were lower.

== Present structure ==
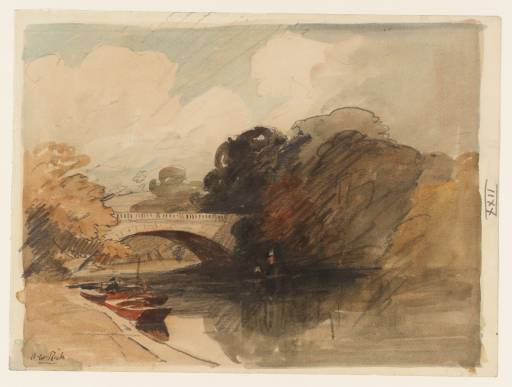
Shillingford Bridge by Alfred William Rich, c 1911, Tate Gallery.

By 1826 the old bridge was in poor repair and the trustees placed an advertisement announcing the wooden structure would be closed starting 10 May 1826 and a ferry provided whilst a new stone bridge was being built. The act of Parliament renewing the trustees' powers, the Shillingford and Reading Road Act 1827 (7 & 8 Geo. 4. c. xix), received royal assent on 2 April 1827 and described the old bridge as "ruinous" and "in part taken down" and the new one "nearly completed". The act also contains one of the earliest mentions of the convention of driving on the left in the United Kingdom laying down a fine of 20-40 shillings (equivalent to £91 to £183 today) for "any person who shall not keep his carriage on the left hand side of the road".

A few months later on 18 June 1827 the Reading Mercury noted that "the Substantial Stone Bridge over the River Thames at Shillingford has for a long time been sufficiently complete for the passage of travellers and their carriages and it will very shortly be finished in all its ornamental parts". The new bridge was entirely made of stone with three semi-circular river spans, the middle one 52 feet (16 m) wide and the flanking pair 36 feet (11 m) each. On the Oxfordshire (north) bank was a small tow-path arch and a 300 feet (91 m) causeway. The toll-keeper's cottage was located on the downstream side of the Oxfordshire bank.

In 1852 the trustees' powers were renewed by the Shillingford, Wallingford and Reading Road Act 1852 (15 & 16 Vict. c. lxxix), which also allowed for additional tolls for vehicles "drawn by steam or machinery". Twenty years later, the Annual Turnpike Acts Continuance Act 1872 was passed allowing the trustees and owners of turnpikes and toll-bridges to surrender their rights to the local highway authority. Bridge traffic had been declining since the opening of the Reading to Oxford Railway in 1844 so the trustees immediately made arrangements to pass the bridge to the counties of Berkshire and Oxfordshire. From midnight on 1 November 1874 tolls were permanently lifted.

Other than the demolition of the toll-keeper's cottage in 1937, the external appearance of the bridge and environs remains as when it was built in 1827. The bridge has been listed Grade II* since 9 April 1952.

== See also ==
- Crossings of the River Thames

Next bridge upstream	River Thames	Next bridge downstream
Little Wittenham Bridge	Shillingford Bridge	Wallingford Bridge
