= Poohsticks =

Simple game played on a bridge over running water

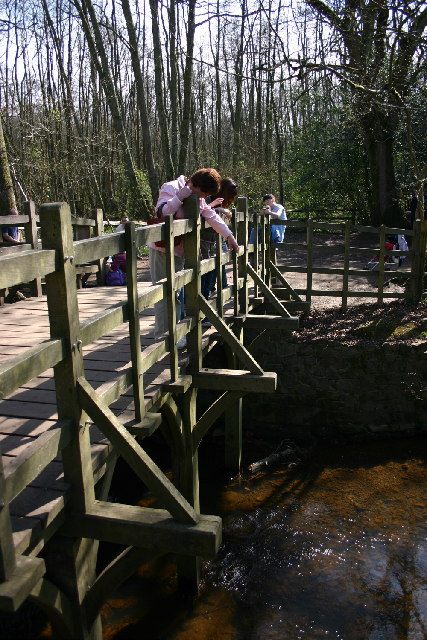
Poohsticks Bridge in Ashdown Forest (51°05′08″N 0°05′52″E)

Poohsticks is a game first mentioned in The House at Pooh Corner, a Winnie-the-Pooh book by A. A. Milne. It is a simple game which may be played on any bridge over running water; each player drops a stick on the upstream side of a bridge and the one whose stick first appears on the downstream side is the winner. The annual World Poohsticks Championships have been held at Day's Lock on the River Thames in the UK since 1984.

== History ==
Pooh, Piglet, Roo, and Rabbit playing Poohsticks

Poohsticks was invented by English author A.A. Milne for his son Christopher Robin Milne. The game first came to prominence upon Milne's description in his 1928 book The House at Pooh Corner, as well as the 1983 Disney animated featurette Winnie the Pooh and a Day for Eeyore. As first depicted, protagonist Pooh accidentally drops a pine cone into a river from a bridge and, after observing how it appeared on the other side of the bridge, devises the rules for Poohsticks, later playing the game with the other characters, Christopher Robin, Tigger, and Eeyore.

Milne first played the game at a bridge located in Ashdown Forest, close to the village of Upper Hartfield, East Sussex, England. Built in 1907 and originally called Posingford Bridge, it is considered to be the bridge on which Milne and his son first played the game. However, it is uncertain whether the game was first played at the bridge and then written into the story, or vice versa. The bridge maintained the public's interest and a campaign to rebuild it in the late seventies was considered important enough to feature on the BBC Nine O'Clock News. The bridge was subsequently reopened by Christopher Robin Milne and officially renamed as Poohsticks Bridge.

The site was so popular that, in 1999, the East Sussex county council made an appeal to Disney as the old wooden bridge had been worn down by an overwhelming number of visitors. The company provided a substantial donation towards the estimated £30,000 needed to replace the bridge. Partly rebuilt in 1979, the donations from Disney, building firms, and members of the public funded its complete reconstruction. The newly-built and modernised bridge retained its precursor's original style. A plaque was also placed to commemorate the occasion and thank those who financially contributed to the project. The game can still be played in Ashdown Forest to this day and the site regularly attracts tourists from as far afield as the United States and Japan. However, visitors are now advised to bring their own sticks, as previous visitors have caused damage to the trees in the vicinity.

The 'original' Poohsticks Bridge, reconstructed from parts of the original supplemented by similarly aged timber, and located near Penshurst, Kent, was sold at auction for over £131,000 (equivalent to about £162,000 in 2025) in October 2021. The buyer, Lord De La Warr, intends to give it "pride of place" on his estate, Buckhurst Park, Sussex.

The traditional game has inspired filmmakers and screenwriters and has been portrayed in the 2017 biographical film on the game's creator A.A.Milne Goodbye Christopher Robin, the1998 film Into My Heart with Rob Morrow and Claire Forlani, BBC sitcom To the Manor Born and also in a Marks & Spencer clothes advert where models, including Twiggy and Myleene Klass, played the game. The popularity of the game was underlined when it featured as a question on long-running British quiz series University Challenge. The "Pooh-stick method" of estimating the flow of a stream gets its name from the use of one or more floating objects (typically passing under a bridge of known width) to calculate the speed at which the water is flowing.

== Rules and strategy ==
A game for two players or more, in the traditional version of Poohsticks the participants must drop a stick simultaneously on the upstream side of a bridge and run to the other side. The winner is the player whose stick first appears on the other side of the bridge. Alternatively, players may decide upon a starting point on a river and a finish line farther downstream. The winner is the player whose stick first passes the finishing point.

It is generally agreed that the stick must be made of organic materials, preferably willow, and not of any artificial materials. All participants must drop their sticks at the same time, usually after a referee shouts "drop", "twitch" or any other agreed keyword. Additionally, no advantage may be gained through either dismantling the bridge or the use of any self-propelling stick devices. The stick must be dropped, not thrown, into the water and any player who is deemed to have thrown their stick is disqualified.

Poohsticks is considered to be a game of chance yet some players, including the 2024 World Champion, claim skill is involved. Some strategies involve the way in which the stick is held before it is dropped and trying to find the fastest route in the river. Author Ben Schott outlined a throwing method as a winning strategy in his third book, Schott's Sporting, Gaming and Idling Miscellany, but his method was dismissed as cheating by competition organisers. In any event, the turbulence around the bridge supports make the path of the stick very difficult to predict and may vary according to the season.

== World Poohsticks Championships ==
Little Wittenham Bridge with the lock keeper's house beyond

Poohsticks was brought to a larger audience by the annual World Poohsticks Championships. Originally, these took place at Day's Lock on the River Thames near Dorchester-on-Thames, Oxfordshire. but were later moved to Langel Common in Witney, also in Oxfordshire, and have attracted over 1,500 visitors, including many from overseas. The championships features an individual event and a four-person team event. Players come from a wide variety of countries including the United States, Japan, Kenya, Australia and England. Before its move to Witney, the event took place from Little Wittenham Bridge but now uses a bridge over the River Windrush near Cogges Manor Farm.

The sporting event was started at Little Wittenham Bridge in 1984 by the lockkeeper, Lynn David, as a fund-raising event for the Royal National Lifeboat Institution (RNLI). He noticed that people occasionally snapped sticks from nearby hedges to play the game and he then came up with the idea of a competition to aid the charity. He put out a box of sticks and a collection box and it soon became an annual event. In this championship version of the game, a finish line is set up farther downstream and the winner is the first to pass this point. The competition originally took place every January, but it was moved to March due to icy weather in 1997.

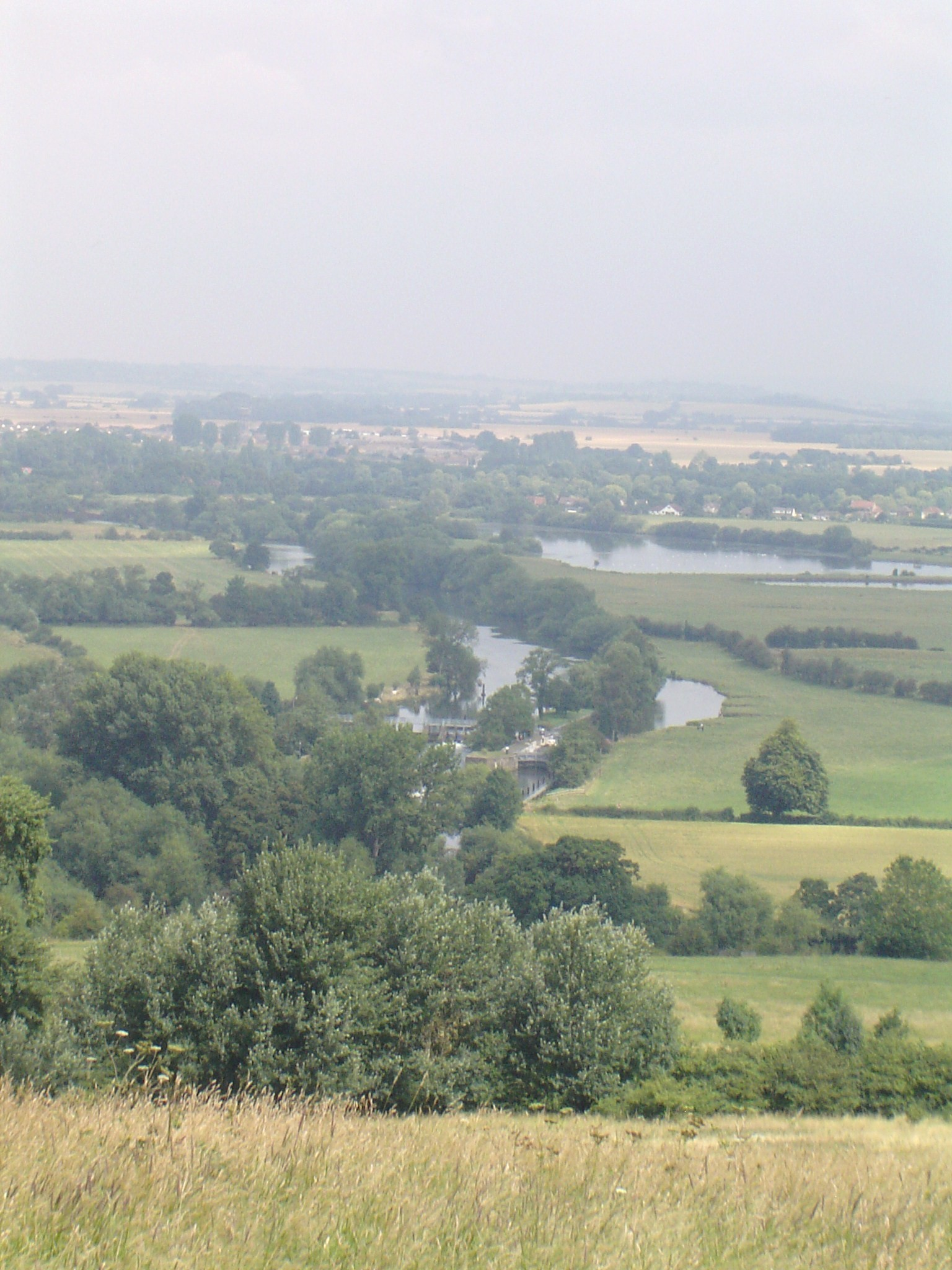
Day's Lock from Wittenham Clumps (or Sinodun Hills) in summer

The event proved popular with the local community and even attracted the attention of the foreign media. After Lynn David's retirement, the running of the event was taken over by the former Rotary Club of Sinodun, based in nearby Wallingford. Additionally, the funds raised were divided between the RNLI and charitable projects supported by the Rotary Club. Twenty years after its first edition, the event had grown in popularity, attracting visitors from across the globe, and had been broadcast on television in countries including Russia, Japan and Czech Republic. Additionally, VisitBritain, the official British tourist board, named it as a highlight in its collection of "Quirky British Events". Throughout its existence, it has raised around £30,000 for the RNLI.

The Championships were at risk of decline when, in 2008, Sinodun Rotary Club declared that its members were simply too old to stage an annual event of its size. The then Sinodun president, David Caswell, stated: "The trouble is there is a lot of heavy work staging the event. Some of our members are over 70, and it was just getting too much". However, the Rotary Club of Oxford Spires declared that its members would continue hosting the event, thus preserving the competition for future generations. The President of Oxford Spires for 2008–2009, Liz Williamson, stressed that it should continue as the event was popular locally and demonstrated quirky English nature to a worldwide audience.

The organisers announced in January 2015 that they had decided that the Little Wittenham site was no longer suitable, citing increasing logistical difficulties as the event had become more popular and the use of the land had changed. In June, the World Championships were held at their new home, one of the cycle-track bridges over the River Windrush on Langel Common, near the Cogges Manor Farm Museum in Witney, Oxfordshire. For the first year at the new location, the organizers decided not to hold the 2015 team games, but team games were restored in 2016. The event continued to be held here until 2018; in 2019, the event was not held due to resourcing issues, and between 2020 and 2022 it was cancelled due to the COVID-19 pandemic. It restarted on 28 May 2023, commemorating the 40th anniversary, at Sandford-on-Thames.

The winners of both the individual and team events receive a trophy or medal, and the second and third-placed individuals and teams also receive a smaller trophy or certificate. Despite claims that the game involves skill more than luck, no team or individual has ever won the competition more than once. The individual competition usually involves winning three rounds of matches before receiving an entry to the final.

== Notable Poohsticks societies ==
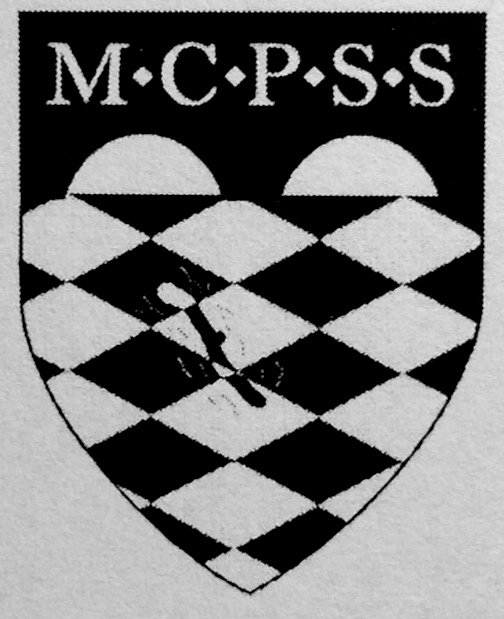
The logo of the MCPSS, circa 2013

Although not a Poohsticks Society as such, the Rotary Club of Abingdon is now responsible for the World Pooh Sticks Championships held annually since 1983, first at Days Lock on the River Thames, then in Witney 2015 to 2018. and the event held in 2023. The Championships were voted 'Britain's Favourite Quirky Event' by Countryfile magazine readers in 2012 and are carried out with the aim of raising money for a variety of charities.

Revival of the Oxford University Pooh Sticks Society has begun thanks to students in Magdalen College, Oxford, with the creation of the Magdalen College Pooh Sticks Society (MCPSS) founded in April 2013 which mixes classic Pooh Sticks games with commentary and rules in the style of radio programme I'm Sorry I Haven't a Clue. Of late the club has become increasingly well known inside the university and is no longer restricted solely to members of Magdalen College.

Founded in 1993, members of the Pembroke College Winnie the Pooh Society of Pembroke College, Cambridge, pay homage to the works of A.A. Milne in a variety of ways, including playing games of Poohsticks alongside events such as visits to the 'real-life' Hundred Acre Wood.
