= Wittenham =

Wittenham is a place name in Oxfordshire, England, as in:

- Little Wittenham
- Little Wittenham Wood
- Long Wittenham
- Wittenham Clumps
