= Nautical measured mile =

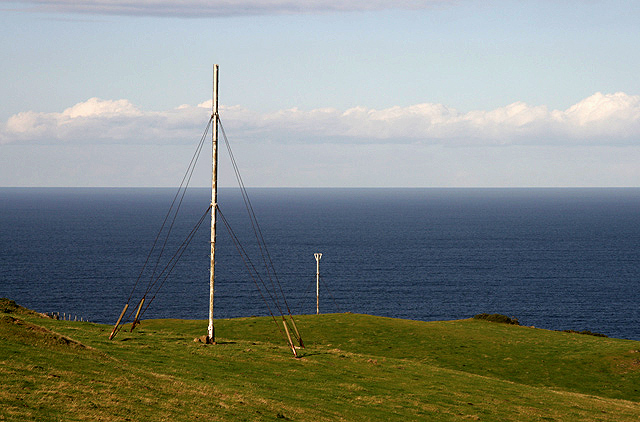
Admiralty distance poles at St Abb's Head.

A nautical measured mile is a method to provide an accurate measure of a nautical mile (nmi) for ships at sea. It consists of two pairs of towers, or other fixed marks, on shore precisely one nautical mile apart.

A nautical mile is measured by sailing on a given bearing past the towers: the start of the mile is recorded when the first pair of towers is seen to line up, and the end of the mile is recorded when the second pair comes into line.

To measure performance accurately ships make at least four to six runs in both directions to allow for the wind and tide.

There were many nautical measured miles around the British Isles, including:

- Stokes Bay on the Solent, for ships of Portsmouth Naval Base.
- Between Talland Bay and Hannafore, West Looe, Cornwall.
- At Skelmorlie, North Ayrshire, Scotland, between Skelmorlie Pier and Skelmorlie Castle.
- Lower Hope Reach, near Gravesend on the Thames Estuary, between Cliffe Creek coastguard station and Lower Hope Point.
- Four Admiralty day beacons (unlit) were installed on Maplin Sands, adjacent to The Warp channel. Buoys in the channel marked the course and vessels under test were required to fly a blue-and-white swallowtail pennant that gave them priority over other traffic.
- There are four Admiralty distance poles at St Abb's Head, Berwickshire, Scotland.
- There are two consecutive miles on the Isle of Arran, Scotland between South Sannox and Corloch.

== See also ==
- Navigation transit markers
