= Shillingford =

Hamlet in Oxfordshire, England

Coordinates: 51.626°N 1.139°W

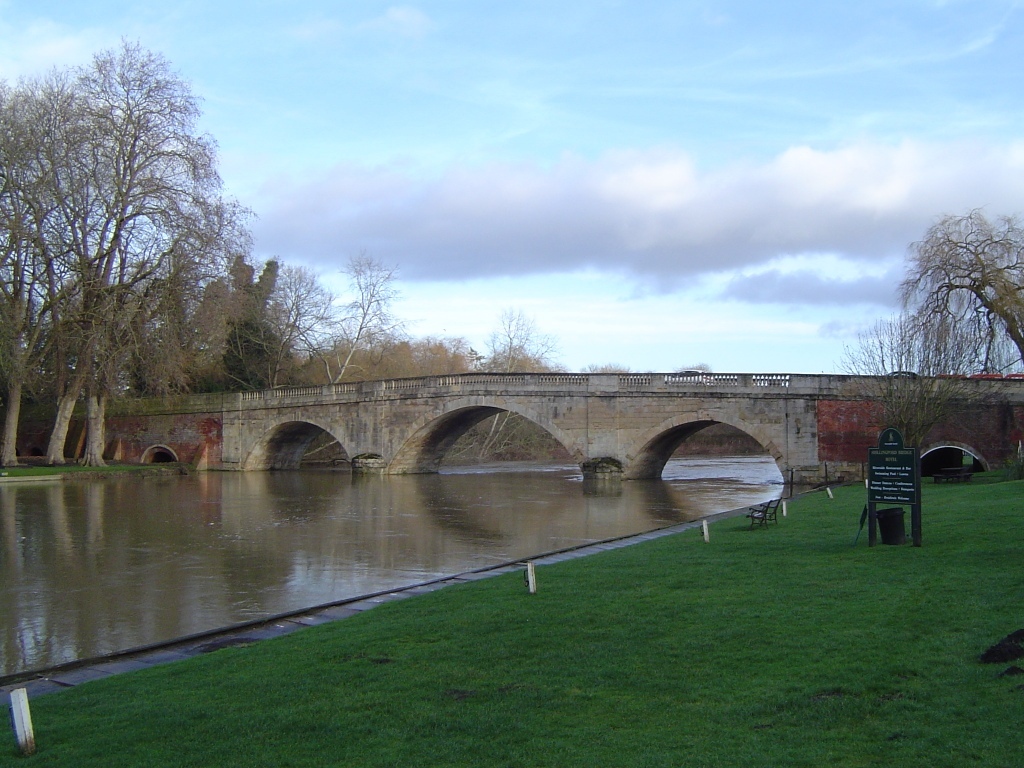
- Shillingford Bridge from the lawn of the Shillingford Bridge Hotel

- Location within Oxfordshire
- OS grid reference: SU5992
- Civil parish: Warborough
- District: South Oxfordshire
- Shire county: Oxfordshire
- Region: South East
- Country: England
- Sovereign state: United Kingdom
- Post town: Wallingford
- Postcode district: OX10
- Dialling code: 01865
- Police: Thames Valley
- Fire: Oxfordshire
- Ambulance: South Central
- UK Parliament: Henley and Thame
- Website: http://ws-pc.org/ Warborough Parish Council]

Shillingford is a hamlet on the north bank of the River Thames in Warborough civil parish in South Oxfordshire, England. It lies on the A4074 between Oxford and Reading, at the junction with the A329.

== History ==
=== Roads and ford ===
At various times the river crossing at Shillingford has been a ford, a ferry or a bridge. Shillingford Bridge was built in 1827, replacing a previous one built in 1767. Neighbouring Wharf Road has a slipway, boathouse and 12 listed buildings (at Grade II), for their age predominantly), about half of its total. The river crossing has long made Shillingford a junction and coaching stop, just below the confluence of the River Thame:

- The main NW-SE road between Oxford and Henley-on-Thames through Shillingford was a turnpike from 1736 until 1873. It became the A415 in 1922, renumbered to the A423 in the 1930s, and now forms part of the A4074. The bypasses around Dorchester and Sandford to the north were built in recent years.
- The traditional road south rather than southeast, to Wallingford and over the bridge was a turnpike from 1764 to 1874. In the early to late 20th century this was the main road between Reading and Oxford, part of the A42 when roads were first classified in 1922 then renumbered the A329 in 1935. In 1993, when the Winterbrook Bridge enabled traffic to bypass Wallingford, the section between Wallingford and Shillingford was downgraded to become an unclassified road
- The road north between Aylesbury, Thame and Shillingford was a turnpike from 1770 until 1875. It became the B4013, to be renumbered A329 when the M40 motorway was opened in the 1970s.

== Notable residents ==
The Quaker minister Ann Crowley was born here in 1765 as was the artist and performer Vivian Stanshall in 1943.

== Landmarks ==
The bridge is in a medieval, simple style built in 1827. It is Grade II* listed as is Bridge House nearby, as it is an authentic early Georgian structure.

== Sources ==
- Thacker, Fred. S. (1968) [1920]. The Thames Highway: Volume II Locks and Weirs. Newton Abbot: David & Charles.
