= Joseph Maltby Bignell =

British architect

Joseph Maltby Bignell (1827–1887) was a British architect, who spent much of his career working with Sir George Gilbert Scott (1811–78).

== Life details ==
He was born in Sloane Square Chelsea, west London, on 18 March 1827 to Joseph and Elizabeth Bignell, and was baptised on 22 April the same year at St James's church, Westminster.
- in the 1841 census we find Joseph (14) living with his parents in Chipping Norton, Oxfordshire; his father a builder.
- In the 1851 census we find Joseph (24) living with his parents in the parish of S Mark, Kennington, south London.
- In 1863 he married Ann Ruddle at Peterborough, Cambridgeshire.
- in the 1881 census he is living at 2 Martello Villas Herbert Road, Wimbledon.
- In the 1882 Westminster electoral register his home address is given as 17 Herbert Road, London SW; his office at 122 Surrey Street.
- in the 1883 Westminster electoral register his home address is given as 17 Herbert Road, London SW; his office at 141 Strand.
- he died on 1 September 1887; the official probate record states the following

BIGNELL Joseph Maltby. PersonaI Estate £1,385 14s. 14 October. The Will with a Codicil of Joseph Maltby Bignell formerly of 5 but late of 12 Orlando-road Clapham in the County oi Surrey Architect who died 1 September 1887 at 12 Orlando-road was proved at the Principal Registry by Jabez Bignell of 12 Courthope Walpole-road Wimbledon in the said County Architect the Brother and John Oldrid Scott of 31 Spring-gardens in the County of Middlesex Architect the Executors.

== Works ==
=== Dorchester Abbey, Dorset. ===
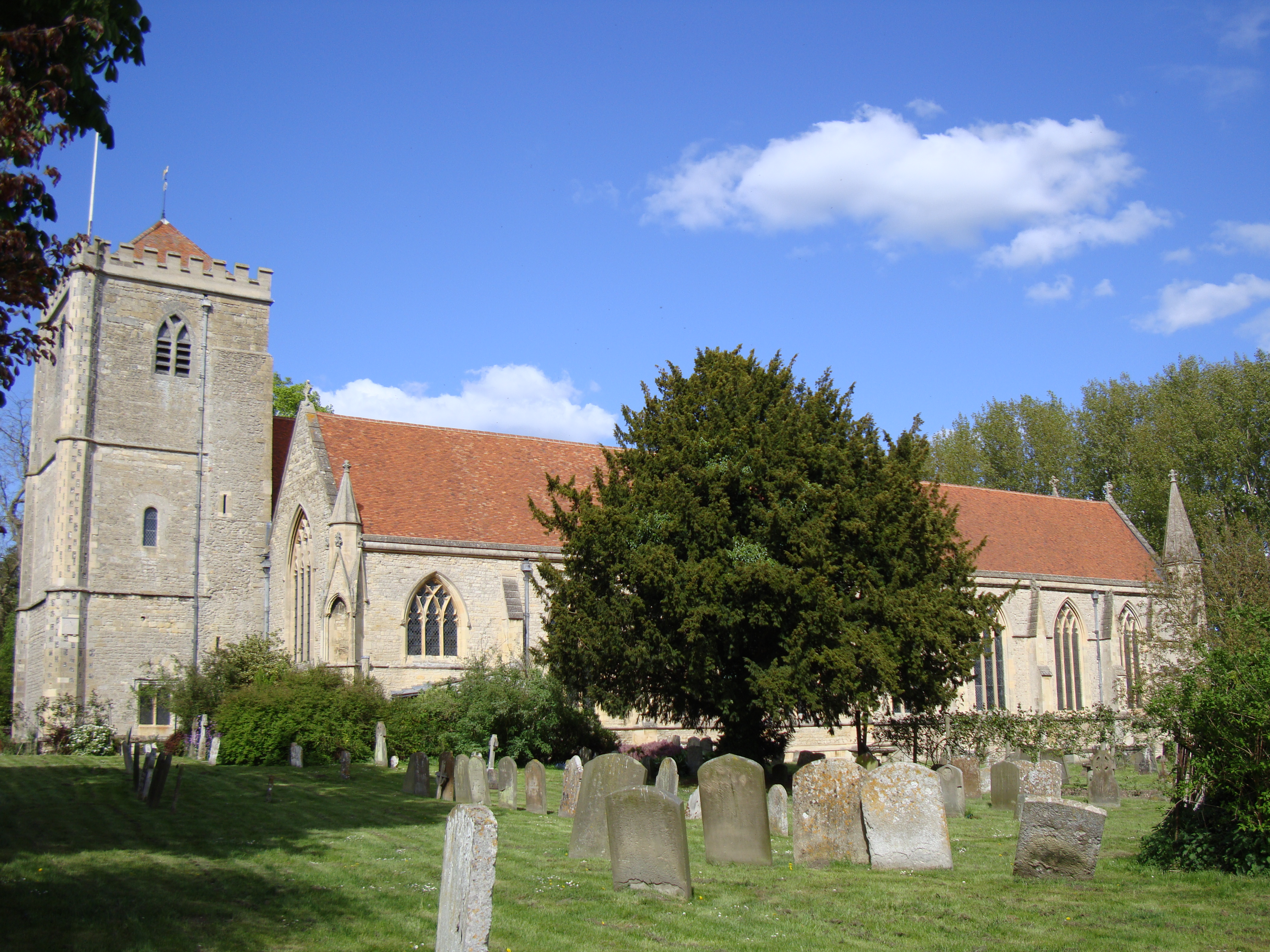
Dorchester Abbey

Over a period of some forty years [from 1845], restoration was carried out on an intermittent basis successively under the direction of four architects: James Cranston, William Butterfield, Sir George Gilbert Scott and Joseph Maltby Bignell [from 1878 to 1883]. Scott had earlier employed his pupil, Bignell, as clerk of works at Dorchester [from 1859].

1879. Proposal to rebuild north transept: not enacted
1882. Norman window in nave restored
1883. West window of the south aisle removed
1888. Repairs to tenor bell
1893-94. New wall paintings in the Lady Chapel.
1900. Two new stained glass windows in the south-east chapel. Chiming train added to tower clock.

=== St Michael and All Angels Church, Walthamstow, London E17 ===
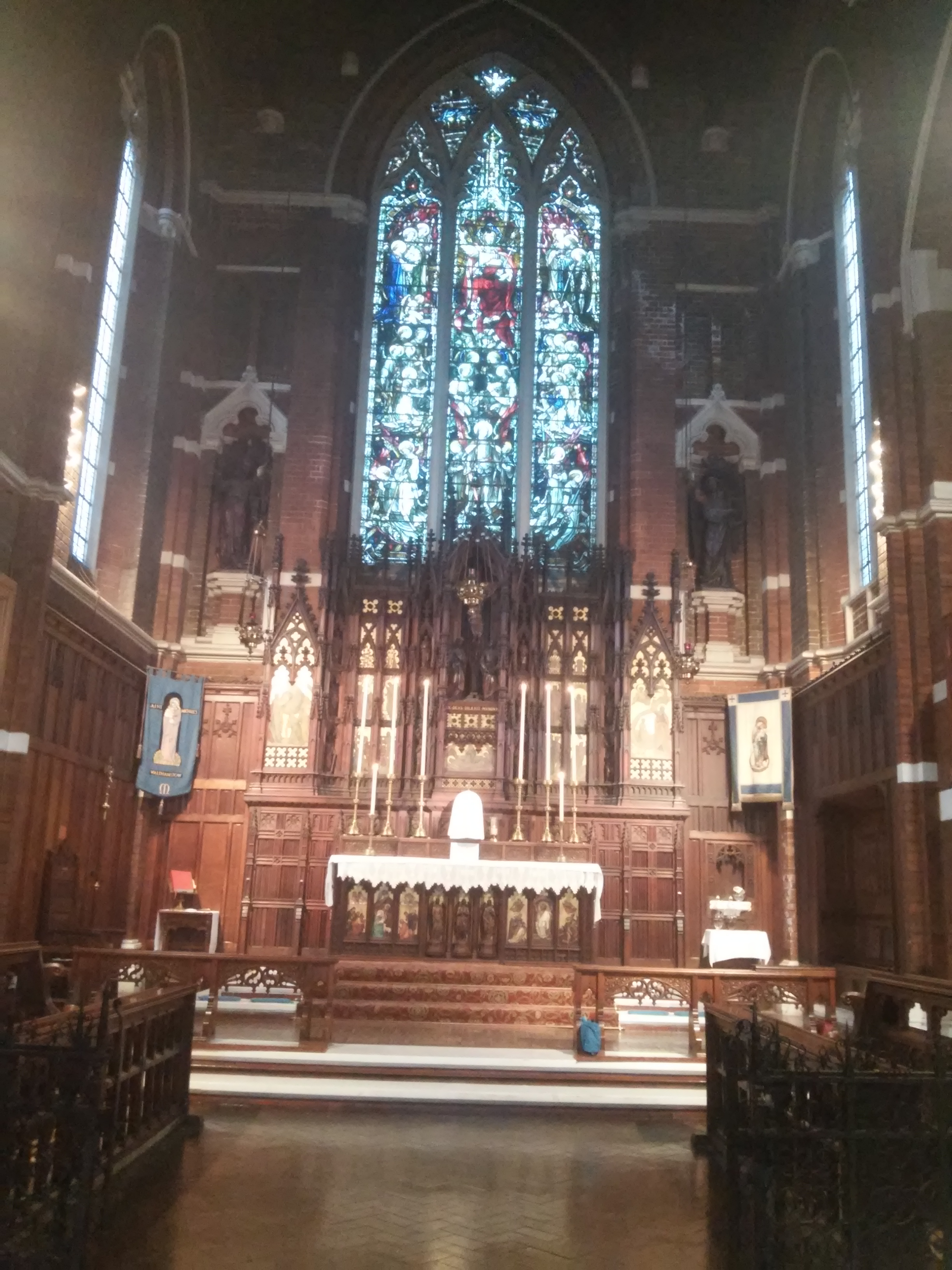
The chancel of St Michael & All Angels church, Walthamstow, London E17

"The church of ST. MICHAEL AND ALL ANGELS, Palmerston Road, the largest in Walthamstow, was built in 1885, to the design of J. M. Bignall [...] The cost was met by public subscription assisted by the bishop of St. Albans' fund. The building, of brown and red brick with stone dressings, is in the Early English style, and has a very lofty nave and chancel with lower side aisles."

=== Wexham Rectory, Buckinghamshire ===
Design for Wexham Rectory, Buckinghamshire by J. M. Bignell (1827-87) published in The Architect, 25 March 1882
