= Ann Crowley =

- Born: 1765; Shillingford
- Died: 1826 (aged 60–61); Uxbridge
- Known for: Quaker minister

Ann Crowley (1765 – 1826) was a British Quaker minister.

== Life ==
Crowley was one of the eight daughters of William and Catherine Crowley. She was born on 8 May 1765 in Shillingford in Oxfordshire where her father was a maltster and mealman. Ann was aware of her weaknesses for music and clothes and unusually appreciative of her parents restraining advice. Ann became aware of her calling when she was sixteen. The following year her father died, but she was content with her life with her sisters. This peace was disturbed when three of them married and one of those three, Mary Ashby, died in 1791.

Two ministers, Sheffield born Deborah Darby and Rebecca Young, visited from Coalbrookdale and their example matched Ann's feelings that she was called to minister too. She left with the two ministers and gradually her own confidence for preaching grew. She shadowed other ministers and in 1794 she toured Wales with Mary Stevens and George and Sarah Dillwyn.

The following year she had to lead her unmarried sisters when their mother died. She was the eldest unmarried sister and she had to arrange a new house for them in Uxbridge. The other sisters created a rota to care for the children of their sister Catherine Ashby when she died leaving a husband and six children, but Ann needed to preach.

Meanwhile, in 1797 Ann became a guide to Phoebe Speakman of Pennsylvania as she preached on a 4,000 mile tour of England, Wales and Scotland. Speakman had been brought from America by Deborah Darby. Their tiring tour took two years. She was to blame "northern blasts" as her health declined. After three years she toured again with Priscilla Hannah Gurney as they ministered in Norfolk, Essex and Suffolk. This again exhausted her and she went home where her youngest sister Rebecca died after an illness. In 1815 and 1816 she toured for the last time and doctors sent her and her sister to recuperate by the sea in Hastings.

She returned for the last time to Uxbridge where she worshipped locally. She was ill and it was seen as a release when she died at her home on 10 April 1826.
