= Navigation transit markers =

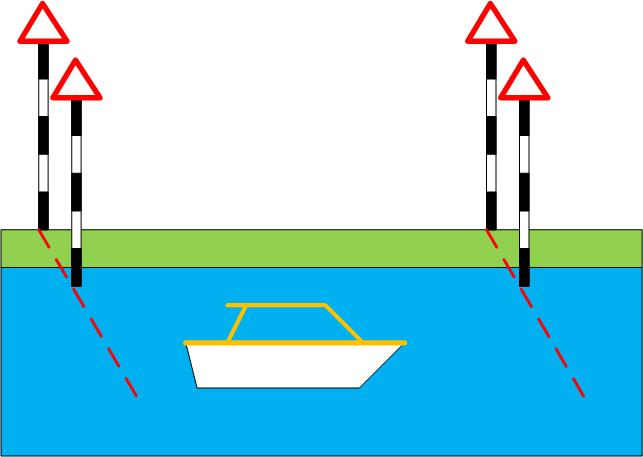
Principle of using navigation transit markers to check speed

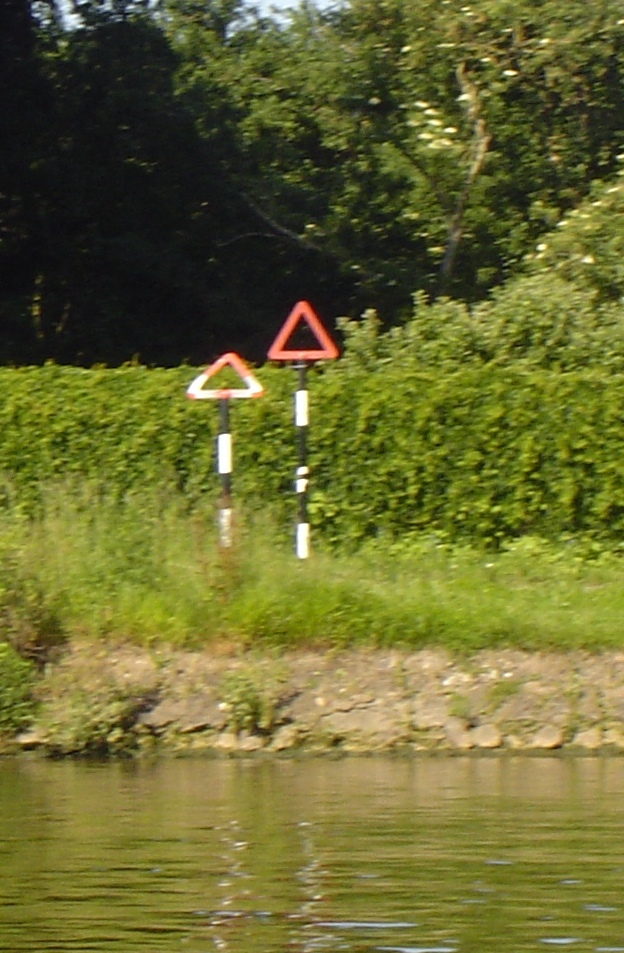
Pair of markers at Kingston

Navigation transit markers are posts placed alongside a navigation to allow powered craft to check their speed. Examples of these markers can be found at several locations along the River Thames in England.

A navigation marker consists of a black and white ringed pole surmounted by a red open triangle. The configuration of the markers is made up of two pairs, each pair having one pole behind the other, and the pairs being separated by a set distance along the bank. Timing starts when the first two markers line up, and ends when the second pair line up. For a craft to be within the speed limit, it should take a minute or more to reach the second pair of markers after passing the first pair of markers. On the upper reaches of the Thames, the speed limit is 8 kilometres per hour (5.0 mph) or 133.3 m (437 ft) per minute, and so the markers are set 133.3 m apart.

On the River Thames, there are markers on the reaches above Teddington Lock, Sunbury Lock, Cookham Lock, Sonning Lock, Day's Lock and Osney Lock.

== See also ==
- Locks on the River Thames
- Nautical measured mile
