= Little Wittenham =

Village and civil parish in South Oxfordshire, England

Coordinates: 51.635°N 1.186°W

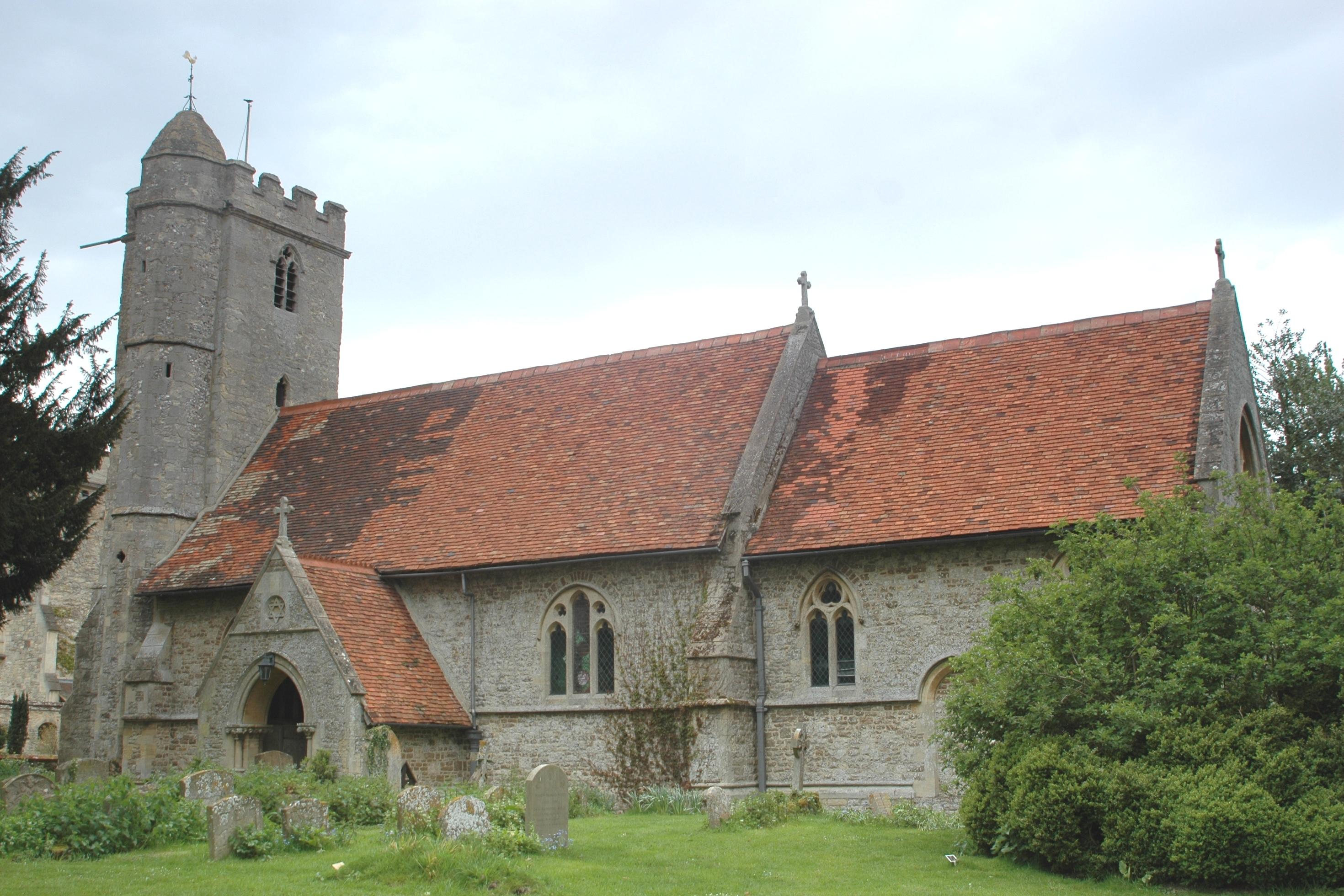
- St. Peter's parish church

- Location within Oxfordshire
- Population: 87 (2001 census)
- OS grid reference: SU564932
- Civil parish: Little Wittenham
- District: South Oxfordshire
- Shire county: Oxfordshire
- Region: South East
- Country: England
- Sovereign state: United Kingdom
- Post town: Abingdon
- Postcode district: OX14
- Dialling code: 01865
- Police: Thames Valley
- Fire: Oxfordshire
- Ambulance: South Central
- UK Parliament: Didcot and Wantage

Little Wittenham is a village and civil parish on the south bank of the River Thames, northeast of Didcot in South Oxfordshire. In 1974 it was transferred from Berkshire to the county of Oxfordshire and from Wallingford Rural District to the district of South Oxfordshire.

== Parish church ==
The Church of England parish church of Saint Peter has a 14th-century west bell tower, of which the lower stages are Decorated Gothic and the upper stages are Perpendicular Gothic. In 1863 the nave and chancel in the Early English Gothic were rebuilt to designs by the Gothic Revival architect Charles Buckeridge. The church was designated as Grade II* listed in 1963. St. Peter's has a number of monuments to members of the Dunche family who lived in Little Wittennham. The most notable is a large monument to Sir William Dunche (died 1611) and his wife. The monument is missing a canopy and supports, but retains alabaster effigies of the couple, a pair of obelisks that would have surmounted the canopy, and a pair of tablets commemorating the couple's children.

== Notable residents ==
Several Dunches were MPs for Wallingford. They include Edmund Dunch (1657–1719), a Whig who was Queen Anne's Master of the Household and a member of the Kit-Kat Club.

== Sites of interest ==
Little Wittenham SSSI is a Site of Special Scientific Interest and a Special Area of Conservation. Day's Lock is north-east of the village. On the opposite bank to the north-east, a little distance from the river itself, is the town of Dorchester-on-Thames which can be reached on foot via Little Wittenham Bridge. South of the village are the hills of Wittenham Clumps and to the south-east is Little Wittenham Wood bordering on the river. From Round Hill, one of the Clumps, there is a view of the village to the north.

== See also ==
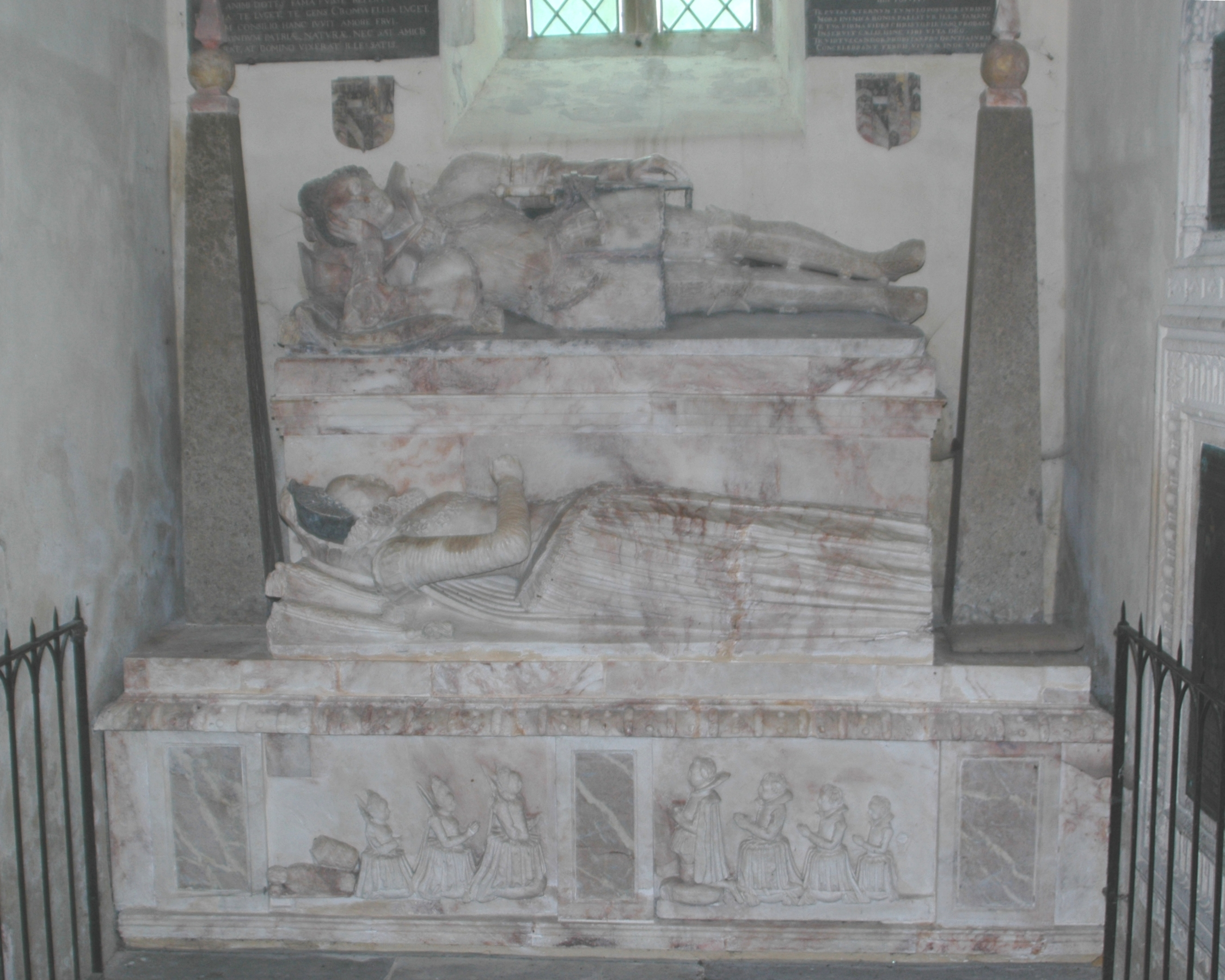
Alabaster memorial to Sir William (d.1611) and Lady Dunche

- Little Wittenham Nature Reserve
- Long Wittenham
- Sylva Foundation

== Sources ==
- Page, W.H.; Ditchfield, P.H., eds. (1924). A History of the County of Berkshire, Volume 4. Victoria County History. pp. 380–384.
- Pevsner, Nikolaus (1966). Berkshire. The Buildings of England. Harmondsworth: Penguin Books. pp. 168–169.
