= Roman Catholic Diocese of Dorchester =

There were two successions of Bishops of Dorchester in the medieval era:

- for the 7th century bishops in Wessex, see Bishop of Winchester
- for the 9th–11th century bishops in Mercia, see Bishop of Lincoln
