= Dorchester Abbey =

Church in Oxfordshire, England

Coordinates: 51.6437°N 1.1644°W

- Abbey Church of St Peter & St Paul, Dorchester
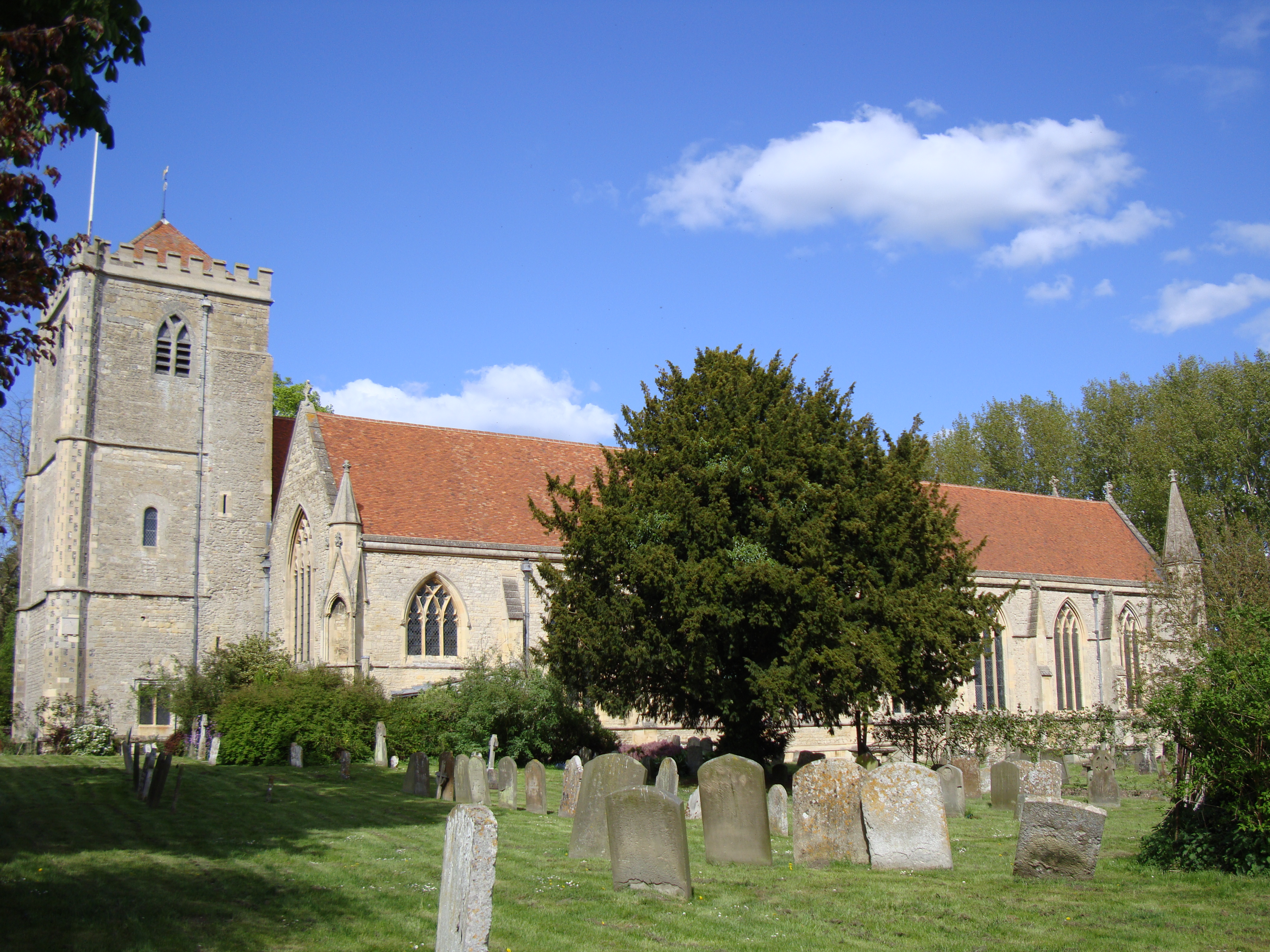
- Dorchester Abbey viewed from the south
- Dorchester Abbey
- OS grid reference: SU 57927 94196
- Location: High Street, Dorchester on Thames, Oxfordshire OX10 7HH
- Country: England
- Denomination: Church of England
- Website: Dorchester Abbey

History
- Founded: 1140; 886 years ago
- Founder: Alexander, Bishop of Lincoln

Administration
- Diocese: Oxford

Clergy
- Vicar: Revd Jane Willis

The Abbey Church of St Peter and St Paul, more usually called Dorchester Abbey, is a Church of England parish church in Dorchester on Thames, Oxfordshire, about 8 miles (13 km) southeast of Oxford. It was formerly a Norman abbey church and was built on the site of a Saxon cathedral.

== History ==
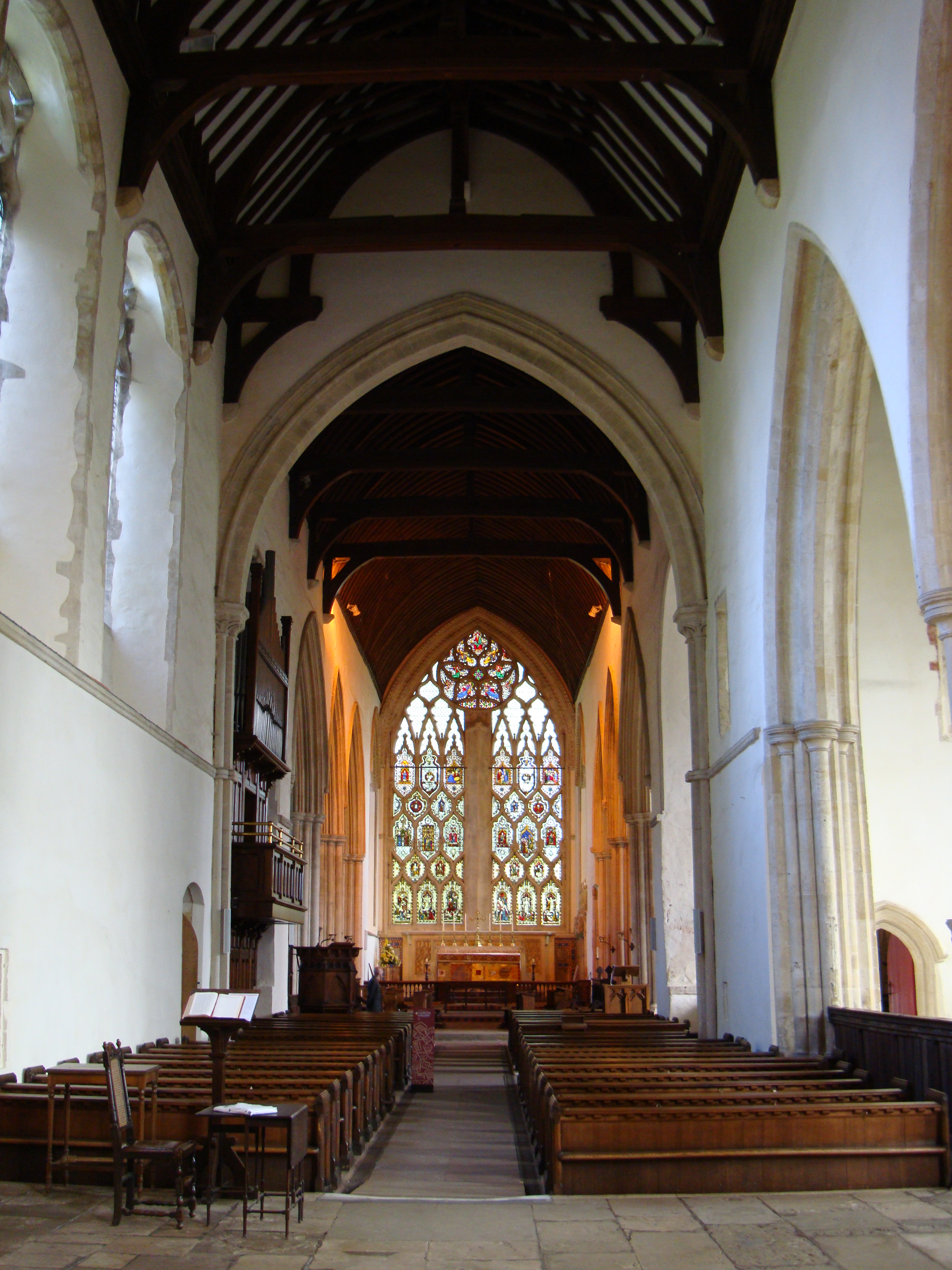
Nave and east window

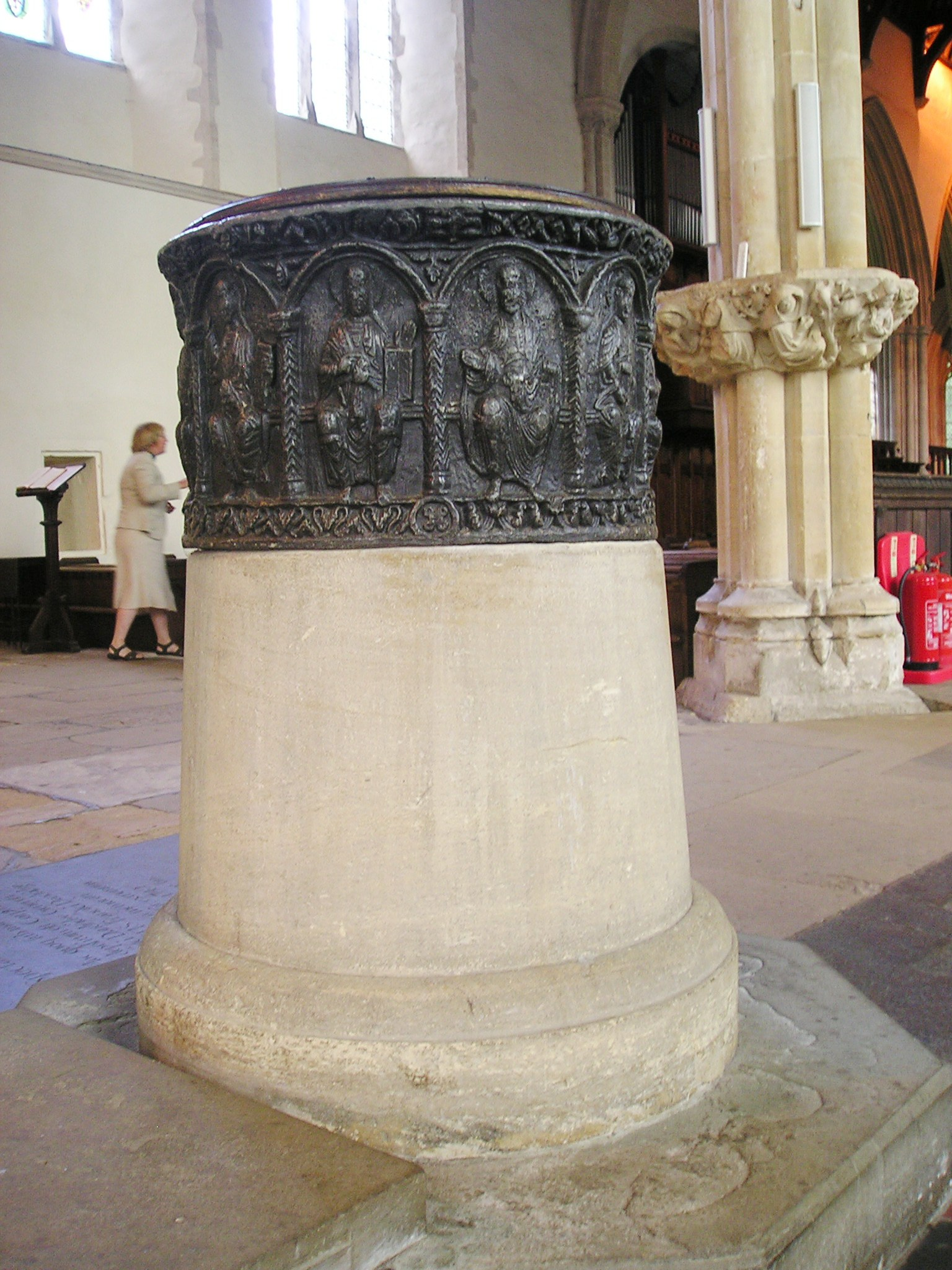
The Norman leaden baptismal font, 12th century

Alexander, Bishop of Lincoln founded Dorchester Abbey in 1140 for the Arrouaisian Order of Augustinian Canons Regular, who were distinguished by wearing white habits rather than the black typically worn by most Augustinian canons. Dorchester had previously been a Roman town and was later under Mercian control. It became the seat of a bishopric in AD 634, when Pope Honorius I sent Birinus as its first bishop. The bishopric remained at Dorchester until 1085, when the Mercian see was transferred to Lincoln.

The abbey, founded fifty-five years after the transfer of the see, was dedicated to Saints Peter and Paul and to Birinus. It was well endowed with lands and tithes from the former bishopric, and had twelve parishes under its authority. These formed part of the Peculiar of Dorchester, until the suppression of such jurisdictions. The first abbot appears to have been Alured, whose name is recorded in 1146 and again in 1163. The last abbot, John Mershe, was elected in 1533 and, along with five of his canons, acknowledged the authority of Henry VIII the following year. He was granted a pension of £22 per year (equivalent to £18,463 in 2025). At the time of its dissolution, the abbey’s revenues were valued at around £220 (equivalent to £184,635 in 2025). Henry VIII reserved most of the abbey’s property for a college dedicated to the Holy Trinity, intended to house a dean and prebendaries, but this institution was dissolved during the first year of his successor’s reign.

In 1536, the abbey was affected by the Dissolution of the Monasteries, resulting in the loss of the monastic buildings and the destruction of St Birinus’ shrine. However, the church itself was saved when a local man, Richard Beauforest, paid £140 to the Crown and later gifted the building to the people of Dorchester parish in 1554. The tower was rebuilt in 1602.

No register or cartulary of Dorchester Abbey is known to have survived. Only one charter, in which King John confirmed the donation of a church, is mentioned by Dugdale. The first lay owner (impropriator) of the abbey site and its grounds was Edmund Ashefeld, after which the property passed through several hands.

== Church ==
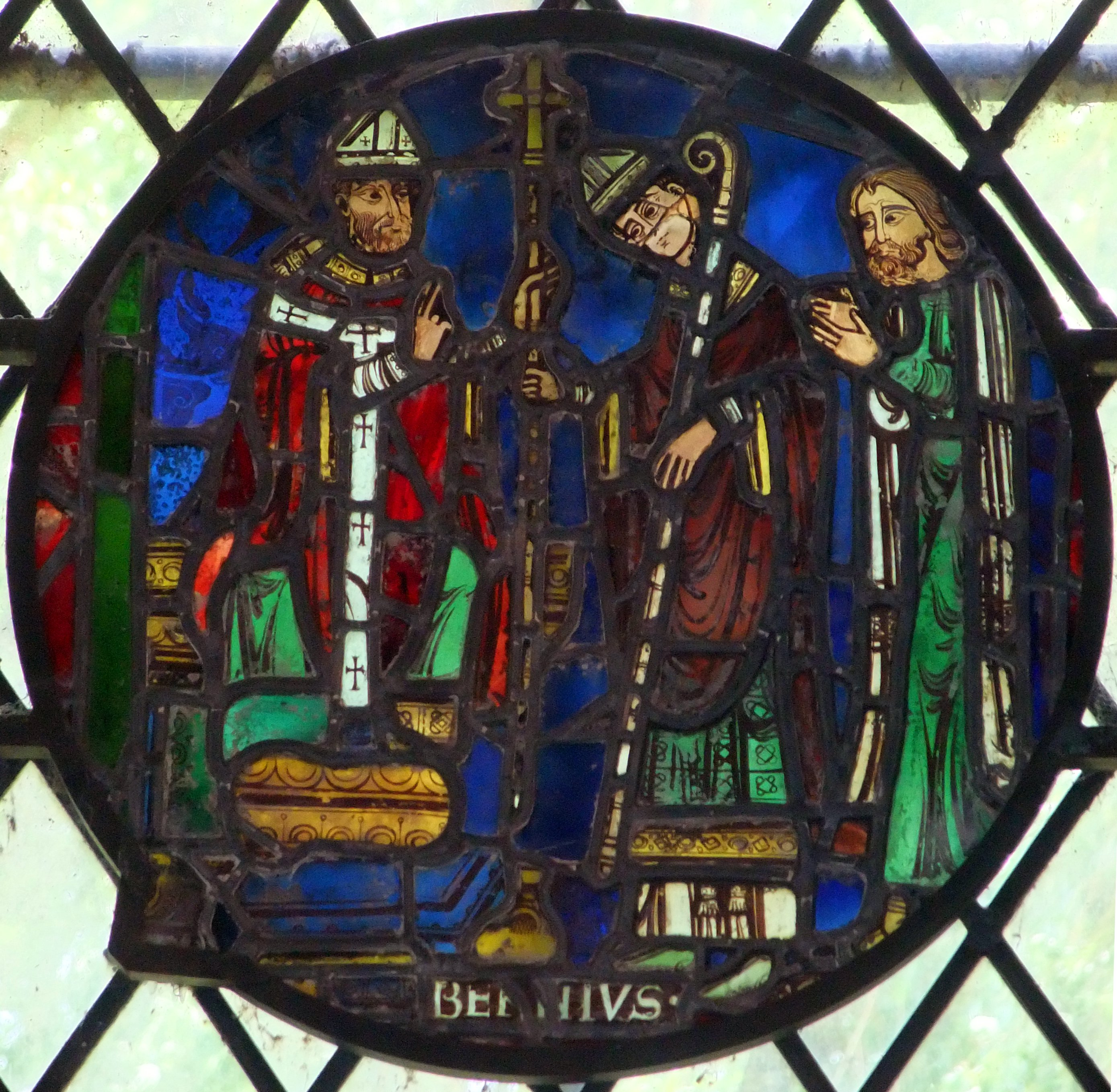
Window showing St Birinus

The church of Dorchester Abbey, as it stands today, was built entirely by the Augustinian Canons, although there are traces on the north side of Saxon masonry, probably part of the ancient cathedral. The whole length of the church is 230 feet (70 m), its width 70 feet (21 m) and its height 55 feet (17 m). The north transept and its doorway are Norman.

The north side of the nave and chancel arch are Early English Gothic. The choir, south side of nave, south aisle are Decorated Gothic. The south porch is late Perpendicular Gothic. The very rich sanctuary, with its highly decorated windows (including the famous east window one known as the Jesse Tree window) and ornately carved sedilia and piscina, dates from 1330.

Other fittings include one of the few surviving lead fonts in England, frescoes of 1340 and several monuments, especially the well-known "swaggering knight" effigy formerly believed to be Sir John Holcombe who died in 1270 but it is more likely that it is William de Valence the Younger (died 1282 at the Battle of Llandeilo Fawr), son of William de Valence, 1st Earl of Pembroke.

Over a period of some forty years from 1845, restoration was carried out on an intermittent basis successively under the direction of four architects: James Cranston, William Butterfield, Sir George Gilbert Scott and Joseph Maltby Bignell (from 1878 to 1883). Scott had earlier employed his pupil, Bignell, as clerk of works at Dorchester [from 1859].

In 1993 a Union Jack that had been draped over the coffins of prisoners of war at Batu Lintang camp, Sarawak, Borneo was placed in the abbey together with two wooden memorial plaques; they had formerly been housed at All Saints’ Church, Oxford.

== Burials ==
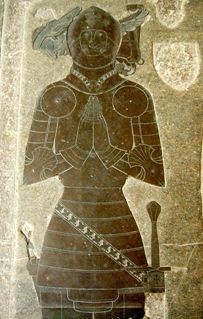
Funerary brass of Sir John Drayton (d.1417)

- Saint Birinus
- Sir John Drayton (d.1417) of Nuneham Courtenay. The Abbey contains his funerary brass.
- Wulfwig
- John Stonor
- Hugh Segrave

== Present use ==
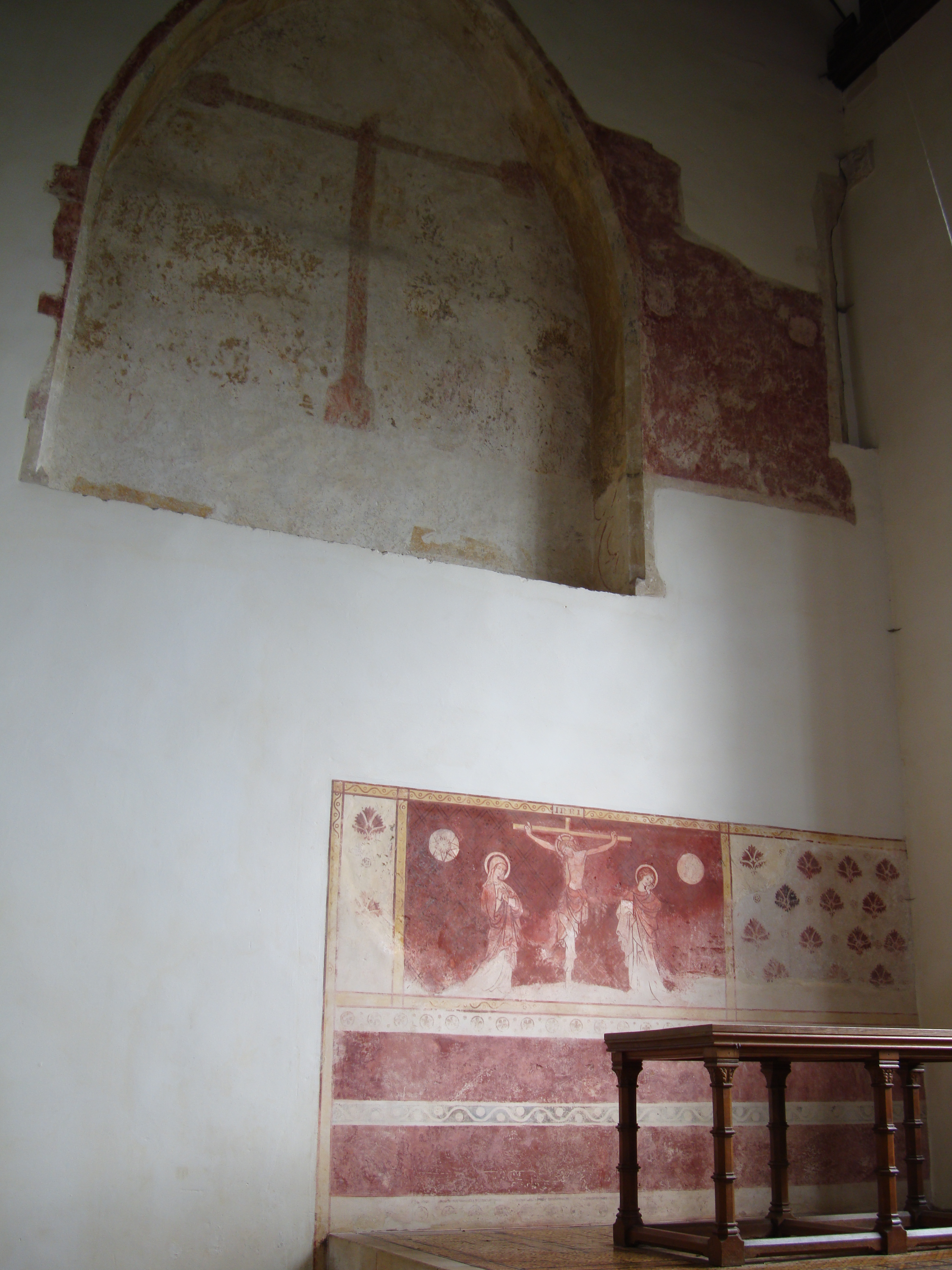
Dorchester Abbey wall paintings

Besides being a parish church, the abbey church is a venue for concerts and cultural events of all kinds.

The alternative rock band Radiohead used the church to record orchestral sections for their albums Kid A (2000) and Amnesiac (2001).

Between 1998 and 2006 the Dorchester Abbey Campaign Committee raised £4,000,000 and this has enabled the Church Council and the Dorchester Abbey Preservation Trust to undertake significant works in the abbey. These include the Cloister Gallery managed by the Dorchester Museum Committee and restoration of medieval and Victorian wall paintings. Dorchester Abbey Museum was longlisted for the Gulbenkian Prize in 2006. The abbey has an improved heating system and a modern kitchen and servery in the Tower room.

The abbey is open every day from 8 a.m. until dusk.

== See also ==
- List of English abbeys, priories and friaries serving as parish churches
- Bishop of Dorchester

== Sources and further reading ==
- Cunningham, CJK; Banks, JW (1972). "Excavations at Dorchester Abbey, Oxon" (PDF). Oxoniensia. XXXVII. Oxford Architectural and Historical Society: 158–164.
- Doggett, Nicholas (1986). "The Anglo-Saxon See and Cathedral of Dorchester-on-Thames: the Evidence Reconsidered" (PDF). Oxoniensia. LI. Oxfordshire Architectural and Historical Society: 49–61.
- Keevill, Graham D (2003). "Archaeological Investigations in 2001 at the Abbey Church of St. Peter and St. Paul, Dorchester-on-Thames, Oxfordshire" (PDF). Oxoniensia. LXVIII. Oxfordshire Architectural and Historical Society: 313–362.
- Lankester, Philip J (1987). "A Military Effigy in Dorchester Abbey, Oxon" (PDF). Oxoniensia. LII. Oxfordshire Architectural and Historical Society: 145–172.
- Lobel, Mary D, ed. (1962). A History of the County of Oxford. Victoria County History. Vol. 7: Thame and Dorchester Hundreds. London: Oxford University Press for the Institute of Historical Research. pp. 39–64.
- Page, WH, ed. (1907). A History of the County of Oxford. Victoria County History. Vol. 2: Ecclesiastical History, etc. Westminster: Archibald Constable & Co. pp. 87–90.
- Rodwell, Warwick (2009). Dorchester Abbey, Oxfordshire: The Archaeology and Architecture of a Cathedral, Monastery and Parish Church. Oxford: Oxbow Books. ISBN 978-1-84217-388-6.
- Sherwood, Jennifer; Pevsner, Nikolaus (1974). Oxfordshire. The Buildings of England. Harmondsworth: Penguin Books. pp. 576–586. ISBN 0-14-071045-0.
- Tiller, Kate, ed. (2005). Dorchester Abbey: Church and People 635–2005. Stonesfield Press. ISBN 0-9527126-4-4.
