= Dorchester on Thames =

Village and civil parish in Oxfordshire, England

Coordinates: 51.644°N 1.166°W

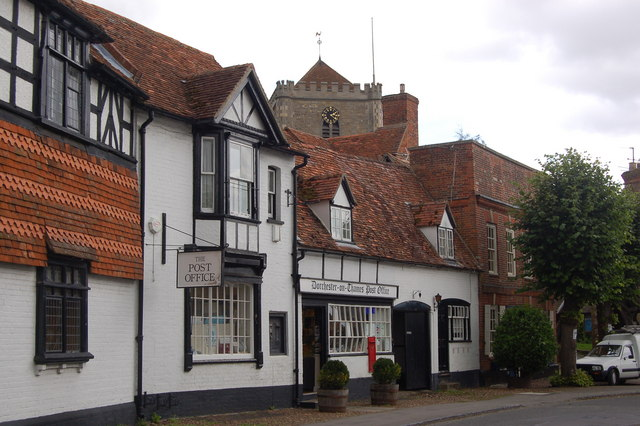
- Dorchester on Thames with the Abbey tower in the background

- Location within Oxfordshire
- Area: 4.18 km^{2} (1.61 sq mi)
- Population: 991 (2021 census)
  - Density: 237/km^{2} (610/sq mi)
- OS grid reference: SU5794
- Civil parish: Dorchester
- District: South Oxfordshire
- Shire county: Oxfordshire
- Region: South East
- Country: England
- Sovereign state: United Kingdom
- Post town: Wallingford
- Postcode district: OX10
- Dialling code: 01865
- Police: Thames Valley
- Fire: Oxfordshire
- Ambulance: South Central
- UK Parliament: Henley and Thame
- Website: www.dorchester-on-thames.co.uk

Dorchester on Thames (also known as Dorchester) is a historic village and civil parish in South Oxfordshire, England. It is situated approximately 9 miles (14 km) southeast of Oxford and 3 miles (5 km) northwest of Wallingford, positioned at the confluence of the River Thame and the River Thames.

The village has a long history of habitation, with evidence dating back to prehistoric times and Roman Britain. It gained significant prominence in the 7th century when Birinus, the Apostle to the West Saxons, established a bishopric here in AD 634. Today, it is best known for Dorchester Abbey, a former cathedral and current parish church noted for its Norman and Gothic architecture.

The Abbey serves as a major cultural venue, hosting the biennial Dorchester Festival and a year-round programme of classical concerts and choral performances.

Due to its location near the Thames Path and the Wittenham Clumps, the village is a frequent base for walking and exploring the surrounding Chilterns and South Oxfordshire countryside.

== Etymology ==
The name Dorchester is shared with Dorchester, Dorset, though the two names are etymologically distinct. The name of the Oxfordshire settlement was recorded by Bede in the 8th century as Dorcic (specifically Civitas Dorcic), later appearing in Old English as Dorcanceaster. The suffix -chester (from the Latin castra) denotes its status as a Roman-era fortified town.

The prefix Dor- is derived from a Common Brittonic root, likely *duvro- (Welsh: dŵr), meaning "water." This refers to the town's location on a peninsula at the confluence of the River Thame and the River Thames. This etymology was recognized in the 16th century by the antiquary John Leland, who, in his poem Cygnea Cantio ("Song of the Swan"), used the Greek-derived name Hydropolis ("water city") as a synonym for Dorchester.

The settlement's formal Roman name is not preserved in early records such as the Antonine Itinerary. The name Dorocina, often associated with the site, is a speculative reconstruction proposed by 18th-century antiquaries and is not supported by contemporary Roman evidence. This distinguishes it from Dorchester, Dorset, which was known in the Roman period as Durnovaria.

== Geography and landscape ==
The parish of Dorchester on Thames covers an area of approximately 2,150 acres (870 ha) on a low-lying gravel terrace within the Thames Valley. The village itself is situated on a peninsula formed by the River Thame to the east and the River Thames to the south and west. The local geology consists primarily of river alluvium and terrace gravels overlying a substratum of Gault Clay.

The physical character of the parish was significantly altered during the 20th century by industrial gravel extraction. This activity created a series of large pits to the north and west of the village centre; many of these have since been flooded to form a chain of lakes, which now support local biodiversity and provide a site for the Dorchester Sailing Club, and fishing lakes. The village is bypassed to the west by the A4074 that closely follows the western boundary of the settlement.

While not within the parish boundary, the Wittenham Clumps (also known as the Sinodun Hills) form the dominant topographic feature of the southern horizon. Rising to 390 feet (120 m) directly across the Thames, these chalk hills provide a natural southern enclosure to the "Great Meadow," the expansive ancient floodplain that separates the village from the riverbanks.

== History ==
=== Prehistoric and Iron Age origins ===
The parish of Dorchester on Thames has been a site of significant human activity since at least the Neolithic period. Its strategic geography (a peninsula protected on three sides by the River Thame and the River Thames) provided a natural defensive advantage. To the south, across the Thames, the Wittenham Clumps on the Sinodun Hills served as a major Bronze Age and Iron Age ramparted settlement. Adjacent to the village lie the Dyke Hills, the remains of a rare Iron Age "valley fort" protected by massive double banks and ditches. These earthworks border the "Great Meadow," a historic stretch of land at the confluence of the rivers that has remained a site of national archaeological and cultural importance for millennia.

=== Roman and Anglo-Saxon periods ===
Following the Roman conquest, a walled vicus (small town) developed on the site, covering approximately 13.5 acres (5.5 ha). A Roman road linked the settlement to the military camp at Alchester, 16 miles (26 km) to the north.

In 634, Pope Honorius I dispatched Bishop Birinus to convert the West Saxons. King Cynegils of Wessex was baptised here and established Dorchester as the seat of the Diocese of Dorchester. This vast diocese initially served as the religious and political centre of Wessex until the see was transferred to Winchester in 660. Though the bishopric briefly returned to Mercian control, the see was ultimately moved to Lincoln in 1085 following the Norman Conquest.

=== Medieval to 19th century ===
In the 12th century, the church was refounded as Dorchester Abbey for a community of Augustinian canons. Following the Dissolution of the Monasteries in 1536, King Henry VIII dissolved the Abbey, but the building was purchased by a local benefactor for use as a parish church.

The aesthetic and historical appeal of the Great Meadow and the river confluence attracted the artist J. M. W. Turner, who visited the area in 1805. He later exhibited the oil painting Union of the Thames and Isis (also known as Dorchester Mead, Oxfordshire) in 1808, capturing the pastoral landscape and the wooden bridge that then crossed the confluence.

=== Modern era ===
The 20th century brought significant changes to both the status and the physical environment of the parish. In 1939, the ecclesiastical importance of the town was recognised through the revival of the title Bishop of Dorchester as a Suffragan Bishop within the Diocese of Oxford. During the Second World War, the town's strategic legacy was reaffirmed by the construction of pillbox defences across the Great Meadow as part of the national anti-invasion network.

In the post-war period, industrial activity, particularly extensive gravel extraction, resulted in the destruction of significant portions of the parish's Neolithic and Bronze Age archaeology. A significant area of the peninsula was quarried, leaving behind the large gravel pits that now define the landscape north of the village. To protect the historic town centre from the resulting increase in heavy traffic, a bypass was constructed in 1981 to the west of the village. This successfully diverted vehicles away from the historic High Street, preserving the architectural integrity of the settlement.

== Amenities ==
Dorchester Abbey serves as the village's Church of England parish church and its primary historic attraction. The site includes a museum, housed in the former 14th-century abbey guest house, which features artefacts detailing the area's 6,000-year history. The Abbey also operates a tea room in the former abbey guest house, open seasonally from Easter to September, offering tea and cake to visitors and locals.

Of the village's estimated ten original coaching inns, two remain: The George and The White Hart. The George Hotel, dating back to the 15th century, retains a galleried courtyard that once served coaches on the Gloucester-to-London route. The village's historic character has made it a frequent filming location for television dramas. The George appeared as "The Stag Inn" in the Agatha Christie's Poirot episode "Taken at the Flood" (2006) and as "The Maid in Splendour" in the Midsomer Murders episode of the same name (2004). The Abbey and surrounding streets have represented fictional settlements such as Midsomer Newton and Devington across multiple series of the latter production.

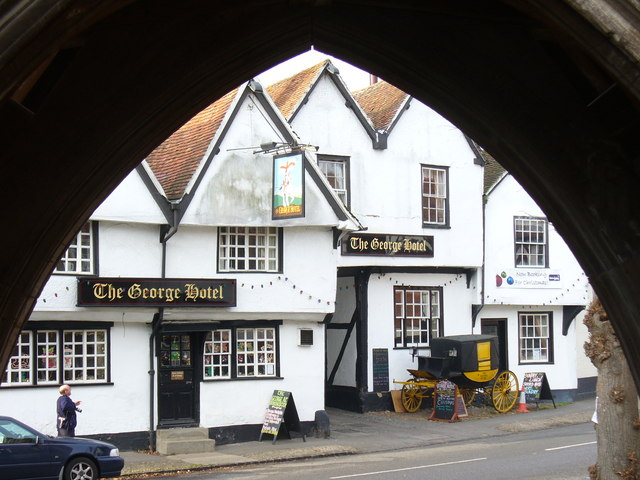
The George hotel, used as a location in Midsomer Murders and Poirot.

At the edge of the village, Bishop's Court Farm provides public moorings on the Thames and a livery yard, as well as a cafe, situated in a converted tractor shed. The farm also serves as a venue for regular jazz performances and seasonal community events.

Local recreational facilities include Minchin Recreation Ground, which includes a playground, tennis courts, outdoor gymn and sports pitches.

On 27 June 2026, the village lost its Co-op Food store, which had served as the village shop since the early years of the twentieth century.

== Education ==
The village is served by Dorchester St Birinus Church of England Primary School, a voluntary controlled school for children aged 5 to 11. The school maintains close historical and liturgical links with Dorchester Abbey. The institution was rated "Good" in its most recent Ofsted inspection (2023), which noted its role as a central hub for the village community.

Secondary-age pupils typically attend Wallingford School in Wallingford, while others travel to the European School, Culham or various independent schools in Abingdon.

The village has a long educational history; a grammar school was founded in 1652 under the will of John Fettiplace. The original schoolroom, a timber-framed building constructed against the north wall of the Abbey, remained in use until the late 19th century and is now the Abbey’s museum & tea room.

== Festivals and events ==
Dorchester on Thames hosts several annual and biennial cultural events, primarily centred on the Abbey and the surrounding landscape:

- The Dorchester on Thames Festival is a biennial ten-day fundraising event held every other May. It features a range of community activities, including concerts, open gardens, and family events, with proceeds supporting Dorchester Abbey and local charities.
- The English Music Festival holds its primary concert series at Dorchester Abbey. The festival is dedicated to the performance and preservation of works by British composers, spanning from the medieval period to the present day.
- Jazz at the Farm is a regular series of musical performances held at Bishop's Court Farm, which has become a significant addition to the village's cultural calendar.

Historically, Day's Lock on the Thames was the site of the annual World Poohsticks Championship. The event was held at the lock from 1984 until 2014, after which it moved to Cogges Manor Farm near Witney due to its increasing size and logistical requirements.

== Notable people ==
- Saint Birinus (died c. 650) – a 7th-century missionary bishop who established the Diocese of Dorchester after baptising King Cynegils of the West Saxons; he is considered the patron saint of Oxfordshire.
- Saint Æthelwold (c. 904–984) – a leader of the 10th-century monastic reform movement who was consecrated Bishop of Winchester at Dorchester in 963.
- Remigius de Fécamp (died 1092) – the last Bishop of Dorchester and first Bishop of Lincoln; he oversaw the transfer of the episcopal see from Dorchester to Lincoln following the Norman Conquest.
- Robert Brydges Addison (1854–1920) – a composer and teacher at the Royal Academy of Music, born in the village.
- Richard Walker (1870–1953) – an Anglican priest who became the first Bishop of Dorchester after the title was revived as a Suffragan Bishop in 1939.
- Celia Haddon (born 1945) – an author and former journalist for The Daily Telegraph, known as a pet "agony aunt".
- Jonty Hearnden (born 1960) – an antiques expert and television presenter (Cash in the Attic); he was a long-term resident and operated an antiques business on the High Street.
- Mark Wright (born 1963) – a former professional footballer and England captain with 45 international caps; he was born in the village.

== Sources ==
- Aston, Michael; Bond, James (1976). The Landscape of Towns. Archaeology in the Field Series. London: J.M. Dent & Sons Ltd. pp. 47, 52, 61, 62, 64. ISBN 0-460-04194-0.
- Booth, P. (2014). A Late Roman Military Burial from the Dyke Hills, Dorchester on Thames, Oxfordshire. Britannia 45(4), 243–273.
- Booth, P. (2012). The Discovering Dorchester-on-Thames project: A report on the excavations, 2007–2011. Dorchester-on-Thames: Parochial Church Council, Abbey Church of St. Peter and St. Paul.
- Dawson Tim, Falys, Mundin, Pine, Platt, Falys, Ceri, et al. (2017). The Southern Cemetery of Roman Dorchester-on-Thames (Monograph (Thames Valley Archaeological Services); 29).
- Dickinson, T. (1974). Cuddesdon and Dorchester-on-Thames, Oxfordshire: Two early Saxon princely sites in Wessex (BAR British series; 1). Oxford: British Archaeological Reports.
- Frere, S. (1964). Excavations at Dorchester on Thames, 1962. London: Royal Archaeological Institute.
- Gibson, A. (1992). POSSIBLE TIMBER CIRCLES AT DORCHESTER‐ON‐THAMES. Oxford Journal of Archaeology, 11(1), 85–91.
- Kirby, D. P. (2000). The Earliest English Kings. New York: Routledge. ISBN 0-415-24211-8.
- Lobel, Mary D, ed. (1962). A History of the County of Oxford: Volume 7: Thame and Dorchester Hundreds. Victoria County History. pp. 39–64.
- Marshall, W. (2015). Dorchester-on-Thames, diocese of. The Oxford Companion to British History.
- Morrison, W., & Crawford, S. (2013). Re-assessing Toys in the Archaeological Assemblage: A Case Study from Dorchester-on-Thames. Childhood in the Past, 6(1), 52–65.
- Peveler, Edward C. (2016). Reassessing Roman ceramic building materials: Economics, logistics and social factors in the supply of tile to Dorchester on Thames, Oxfordshire. Arqueología De La Arquitectura, (13), Arqueología de la arquitectura, 13.
- Sherwood, Jennifer; Pevsner, Nikolaus (1974). Oxfordshire. The Buildings of England. Harmondsworth: Penguin Books. pp. 576–586. ISBN 0-14-071045-0.
- Tiller, Kate, ed. (2005). Dorchester Abbey: Church and People 635–2005. Stonesfield Press. ISBN 0-9527126-4-4.
