= Fecundity selection =

Mode of natural selection

Fecundity selection, also known as fertility selection, is the fitness advantage resulting from selection on traits that increases the number of offspring (i.e. fecundity). Charles Darwin formulated the theory of fecundity selection between 1871 and 1874 to explain the widespread evolution of female-biased sexual size dimorphism (SSD), where females were larger than males.

Along with the theories of natural selection and sexual selection, fecundity selection is a fundamental component of the modern theory of Darwinian selection. Fecundity selection is distinct in that large female size relates to the ability to accommodate more offspring, and a higher capacity for energy storage to be invested in reproduction. Darwin's theory of fecundity selection predicts the following:

1. Fecundity depends on variation in female size, which is associated with fitness.
2. Strong fecundity selection favors large female size, which creates asymmetrical female-biased sexual size dimorphism.

Although sexual selection and fecundity selection are distinct, it still may be difficult to interpret whether sexual dimorphism in nature is due to fecundity selection, or to sexual selection. Examples of fecundity selection in nature include self-incompatibility flowering plants, where pollen of some potential mates are not effective in forming seed, as well as bird, lizard, fly, and butterfly and moth species that are spread across an ecological gradient.

== Moreau–Lack's rule ==
In 1944, Reginald Ernest Moreau suggested that in more seasonal environments or higher latitudes, fecundity depends on high mortality. David Lack suggested in 1954 that differential food availability and management across latitudes play a role in offspring and parental fitness. Lack also highlighted that more opportunities for parents to collect food due to an increase in day-length towards the poles is an advantage. This means that moderately higher altitudes provide more successful conditions to produce more offspring. However, extreme day-lengths (i.e. at the poles) may work against parental survival as repetitive food searching would exhaust the parent.

Together, the Moreau–Lack rule hypothesizes that fecundity increases with increasing latitude. Evidence supporting and doubting this claim has led to the consolidation of other predictions, which may better explain Moreau–Lack's rule.

=== Seasonality and Ashmole's hypothesis ===
Ashmole (1963) suggested (bird) fecundity depends on seasonality patterns. Food differences in availability between seasons are greater towards higher latitudes, so birds are predicted to experience low survival during the winter due to limited resources. This decline in population may be advantageous for survivors, since there is more food available by the next breeding season. This leads to an enhancement of energy when invested in fitness as a result of higher fecundity. Therefore, Ashmole's hypothesis is dependent upon resource availability as a factor fecundity.

=== Differences in nest predation ===
Areas with severe nest predation tend to be those of large clutches/litters, especially in the tropics, as they are more noticeable to predators (frequent parental care, noisier offspring). This predation pressure may lead to the selection for multiple nests of smaller size, with shorter development time.

A criticism of this hypothesis is that it indirectly assumes that these nest-predators are visually-oriented, however, they may be chemically oriented, too, with heightened olfactory senses.

=== Length of breeding season (LBS) hypothesis ===
Populations at higher latitudes experience an increasing seasonality and shorter warm seasons. As a result, these populations have more chances of having multiple reproductive episodes. Intense fecundity selection depends on the length of breeding season (LBS). Factors that may delay LBS or the start of breeding season, are snow cover or delayed food growth, which, in turn, minimizes the chance for these populations to reproduce.

Long breeding seasons towards the tropics favor smaller clutches since females are able to balance energy reserved for reproduction, and the risk of predation. Fecundity selection acts by favoring early reproduction and higher clutch size in species that reproduce frequently. The opposite trend is seen in populations that reproduce less frequently, where delayed reproduction is favored.

=== The 'bet-hedging strategy' hypothesis ===
The total fecundity per year depends on the length of breeding season (LBS), which also determines the number of breeding episodes. In addition, the total fecundity also depends on nest predation, as it describes differential survival over a variety of populations. When food is limited, and the breeding season is long, and nest predation is intense, selection tends to favor a 'bet-hedging' strategy, where the risk of predation is spread over many smaller clutches. This means that the success of the number of offspring depends on whether they are large in size or not. The strategy suggests that fewer, but larger, clutches in higher latitudes are a result of food seasonality, nest predation, and LBS.

== In nature ==
The findings below are based on individual research studies.

=== Southern and Northern Hemisphere birds ===
It has been assumed that parents of fewer offspring, with a high probability of adult survival, should permit less risk to themselves. Even though this compromises their young, the overall fitness of their offspring is reduced, which is a strategy to invest in producing more offspring in the future. It was found that within and between regions, there is a negative correlation between clutch size and adult survival. Southern-Hemisphere parents were inclined to reduce mortality risk to themselves, even at a cost to their offspring, whereas Northern parents experienced greater risk to themselves to reduce risk to their offspring.

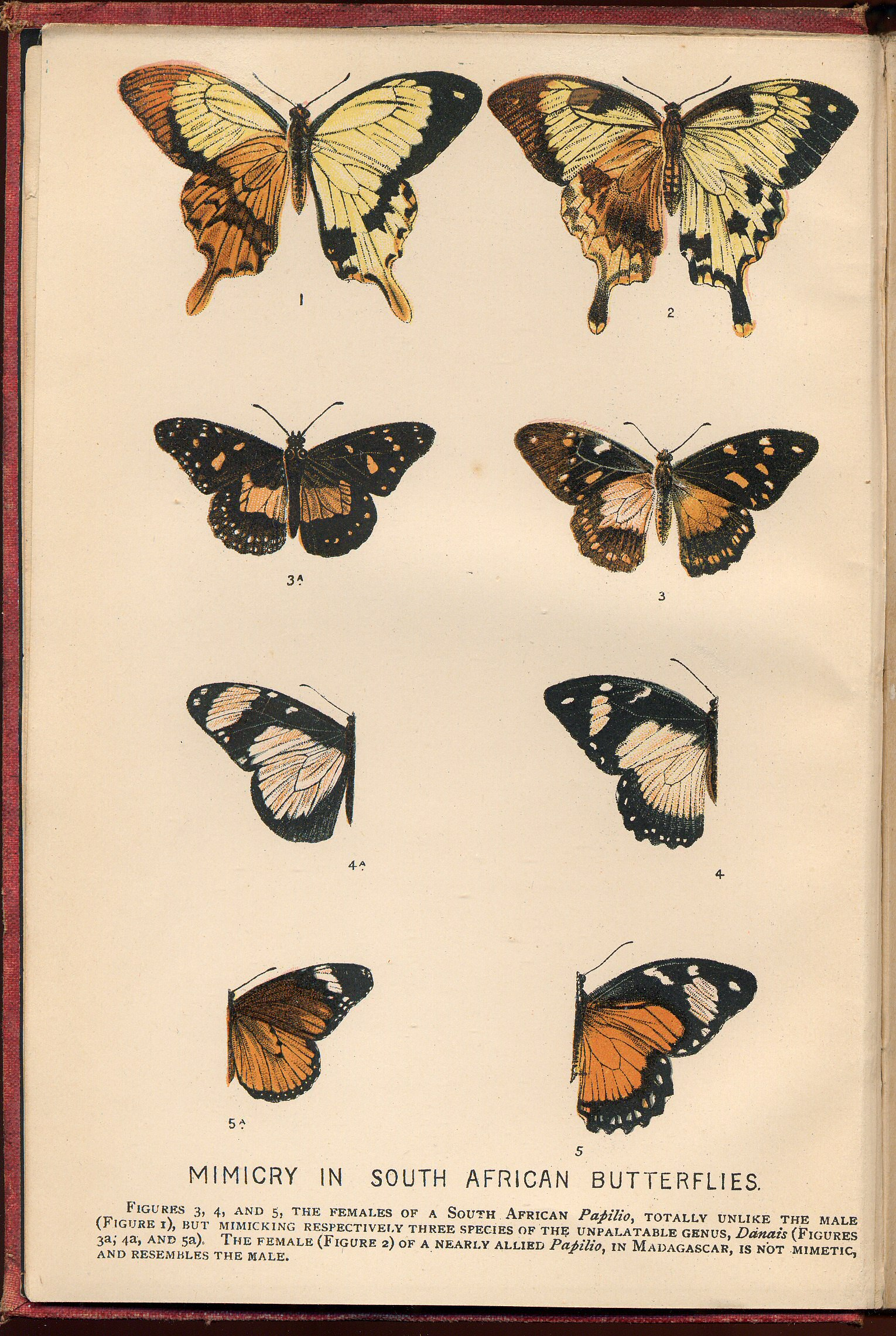
(Edward B. Poulton, 1890). Differences in wing size, wing shape, wing color pattern, the size and shape of antennae and of body hairs, as well as abdominal characteristics in butterfly. Females (right) are overall much larger than males (left)

=== Liolaemus lizard ===
Liolaemus species span from the Atacama Desert to austral rain forests and Patagonia, and across a wide range of altitudes. Due to radiation, life history strategies have diversified within this genus. In turn, it was found that increased fecundity does not lead to female-biased SSD, which is also not effected by latitude-elevation.

=== Drosophila melanogaster ===
In lines of D. melanogaster selected for increased fecundity (i.e. more eggs laid over an 18-hour period), females experienced an increase in thorax and abdomen width than males. In general, SSD increased with selection for increased fecundity. These results support the hypothesis that in response to fecundity selection, SSD can evolve rapidly.

=== Lepidoptera butterfly and moth species ===
Female-biased SSD in many Lepidopteran species are initiated during their developmental period. Since females of this species, as in many other species, reserve their larval resources for reproduction, fecundity depends on larger (female) size. In this way, larger females can enhance fecundity as well as their survival by having multiple partners.

== Other types of selection ==
Natural selection is defined as the differential survival and/or reproduction of organisms as a function of their physical attributes, where their 'fitness' is the ability to adapt to the environment and produce more (fertile) offspring. The trait(s) that contribute to survival or reproduction of offspring has a higher chance of being expressed in the population.

Sexual selection acts to refine secondary sexual (i.e. non-genital) phenotypes, such as the morphological differences between males and females (sexual dimorphism), or even differences between species of the same sex. As a refinement to Darwin's theory of selection, Trivers (1974) observed that:

1. Females are the limiting sex and invest more in offspring than males
2. Because males tend to be in excess, males tend to develop ornaments for attracting mates (female choice), as well competing with other males.

== See also ==
- Fecundity
- r/K selection theory
