= Fecundity =

Natural capability to produce offspring

Fecundity is a descriptor of productivity that can be defined in multiple ways; including the capability to produce offspring. It may refer to the level of fertility of human, animal, and organic life as measured by the number of gametes (eggs), seed set, or asexual propagules. Additionally, it is the potential for reproduction of a recorded population as opposed to a sole organism. The term fecundity in biology is often used to denote the rate of offspring production over one time step (typically annual). In this sense, fecundity may include both birth rates and survival of young to that time step. In sexual evolutionary biology, especially in sexual selection, fecundity is contrasted to reproductivity.

== Population ecology ==
In population ecology, fecundity is a measure of the reproductive capacity of an individual or population, typically restricted to the reproductive individuals. It can be equally applied to sexual and asexual reproduction, as the purpose of fecundity is to measure how many new individuals are being added to a population.

Fecundity may be defined differently for different ecological studies to explain the specific data examined by the respective study. For example, some studies use apparent fecundity to describe that their data looks at a particular moment in time rather than the species' entire life span. In other studies, these definitions are changed to better quantify fecundity for the organism in question. This need is particularly true for modular organisms, as their modular organization differs from the more typical unitary organism, in which fecundity is best defined through a count of offspring. Fecundity is a significant component of fitness. Fecundity selection builds on that idea. This idea claims that the genetic selection of traits that increase an organism's fecundity is, in turn, advantageous to an organism's fitness.

=== Life history patterns (parity) ===
Parity is the organization of fecundity into two distinct types, semelparity and iteroparity.

Semelparity occurs when an organism reproduces only once in its lifetime, with death being a part of its reproductive strategy. These species produce many offspring during their one reproductive event, giving them a potential advantage when it comes to fecundity, as they are producing more offspring.

Iteroparity is when a species reproduces multiple times over its lifetime. This species' strategy is to protect against the unpredictable survivability of their offspring, in which if their first litter of offspring dies, they can reproduce again and replace the dead offspring. It also allows the organism to care for its offspring, as they will be alive during their development.

=== Fecundity selection ===
Fecundity selection, also known as fertility selection, is the fitness advantage resulting from selection on traits that increases the number of offspring (i.e. fecundity). Charles Darwin formulated the theory of fecundity selection between 1871 and 1874 to explain the widespread evolution of female-biased sexual size dimorphism (SSD), where females were larger than males.

Along with the theories of natural selection and sexual selection, fecundity selection is a fundamental component of the modern theory of Darwinian selection. Fecundity selection is distinct in that large female size relates to the ability to accommodate more offspring, and a higher capacity for energy storage to be invested in reproduction. Darwin's theory of fecundity selection predicts the following:

Although sexual selection and fecundity selection are distinct, it still may be difficult to interpret whether sexual dimorphism in nature is due to fecundity selection, or to sexual selection. Examples of fecundity selection in nature include self-incompatibility flowering plants, where pollen of some potential mates are not effective in forming seed, as well as bird, lizard, fly, and butterfly and moth species that are spread across an ecological gradient.

=== Factors affecting fecundity ===
There are a multitude of factors that potentially affect the rates of fecundity. For example: ontogeny, population density and latitude. Additionally, social trends and societal norms may influence fecundity, though this influence tends to be temporary. Indeed, it is considered impossible to cease reproduction based on social factors, and fecundity tends to rise after a brief decline. Fecundity has also been shown to increase in ungulates with relation to warmer weather.

==== Ontogeny ====
Fecundity in iteroparous organisms often increases with age but can decline at older ages. Several hypotheses have been proposed to explain this relationship. For species with declining growth rates after maturity, the suggestion is that as the organism's growth rate decreases, more resources can be allocated to reproduction. Other possible explanations exist for this pattern for organisms that do not grow after maturity. These explanations include: increased competence of older individuals; less fit individuals have already died off; or since life expectancy decreases with age, older individuals may allocate more resources to reproduction at the expense of survival. In semelparous species, age is frequently a poor predictor of fecundity. In these cases, size is likely a better predictor.

==== Population density ====
Population density is often observed to negatively affect fecundity, making fecundity density-dependent. The reasoning behind this observation is that once an area is overcrowded, fewer resources are available for each individual. Thus there may be insufficient energy to reproduce in high numbers when offspring survival is low. Occasionally high density can stimulate the production of offspring, particularly in plant species, because if there are more plants, there is food to lure pollinators, who will then spread that plant's pollen and allow for more reproduction.

==== Latitude ====
There are many different hypotheses to explain the relationship between latitude and fecundity. A hypothesis proposed by Reginald Ernest Moreau claims that fecundity increases predictably with increasing latitude, the explanation being that there is higher mortality in seasonal environments.

A different hypothesis by David Lack attributes the positive relationship to the change in daylight hours found with changing latitudes. These differing daylight hours, in turn, change the hours in which a parent can collect food. It also accounts for a drop in fecundity at the poles due to their extreme amounts of day lengths, which can exhaust the parent.

Fecundity intensity due to seasonality is a hypothesis proposed by Phillip Ashmole. It suggests that latitude affects fecundity due to seasonality increasing with increasing latitudes. This theory relies on the mortality concept proposed by Moreau but focuses on how seasonality affects mortality and, in turn, population densities. Thus in places with higher mortality, there is more food availability, leading to higher fecundity.

Another hypothesis claims that seasonality affects fecundity due to varying lengths of breeding season. This idea suggests that shorter breeding seasons select a larger clutch size to compensate for the reduced reproduction frequency, thus increasing those species' fecundity.

=== Fecundity schedules ===
Fecundity schedules are data tables that display the patterns of birth amongst individuals of different ages in a population. These are typically found in life tables under the columns Fx and mx. Fx lists the total number of young produced by each age class, and mx is the mean number of young produced, found by finding the number of young produced per surviving individual. For example, if you have 12 individuals in an age class and they produced 16 surviving young, the Fx is 16, and the mx is 1.336.

== Infecundity ==
Infecundity is a term meaning "inability to conceive after several years of exposure to the risk of pregnancy." This usage is prevalent in medicine, especially reproductive medicine, and in demographics. Infecundity would be synonymous with infertility, but in demographic and medical use fertility (and thus its opposite infertility) may refer to quantity and rates of offspring produced, rather than any physiological or other limitations on reproduction.

== Human demography ==
Human demography considers only human fecundity, at culturally varying rates, whereas population biology studies all organisms. While fecundity levels vary geographically, fecundity is generally a consistent feature of each culture. Fecundation is another term for fertilization.

In obstetrics and gynecology, fecundability is the probability of being pregnant in a single menstrual cycle, and fecundity is the probability of achieving a live birth within a single cycle.

== See also ==
- Age and female fertility
- Biological life cycle
- Natalism
