= Roke =

Hamlet in Oxfordshire, England

Coordinates: 51.6370°N 1.0947°W

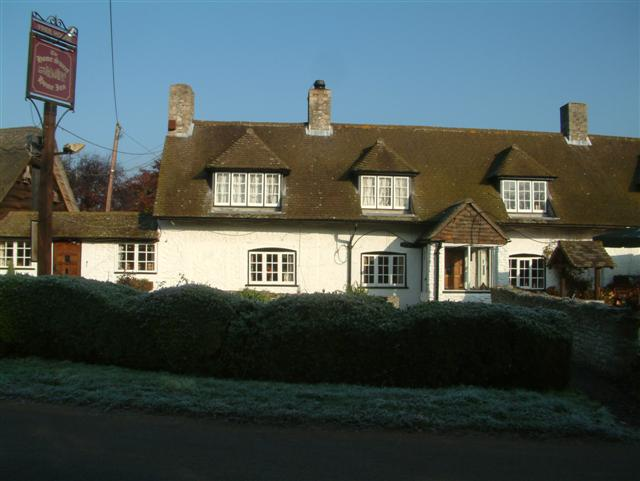
- The Home Sweet Home

- Location within Oxfordshire
- OS grid reference: SU626936
- Civil parish: Berrick Salome
- District: South Oxfordshire
- Shire county: Oxfordshire
- Region: South East
- Country: England
- Sovereign state: United Kingdom
- Postcode district: OX10
- Dialling code: 01491
- Police: Thames Valley
- Fire: Oxfordshire
- Ambulance: South Central
- UK Parliament: Henley
- Website: Berrick & Roke

Roke is a hamlet in South Oxfordshire, about 3 miles (4.8 km) north of Wallingford. It has a sixteenth-century public house, the Home Sweet Home. It is now included in the neighbouring civil parish of Berrick Salome.

== Culture ==
Roke hosts the annual Rokefest Beer and Music Festival.

Roke is mentioned in the lyrics of the cult 1980s indie song '(I Wish He Was Like) Michael Fish' by Rachel & Nicki and is depicted amongst the photos on the back of the record sleeve.
