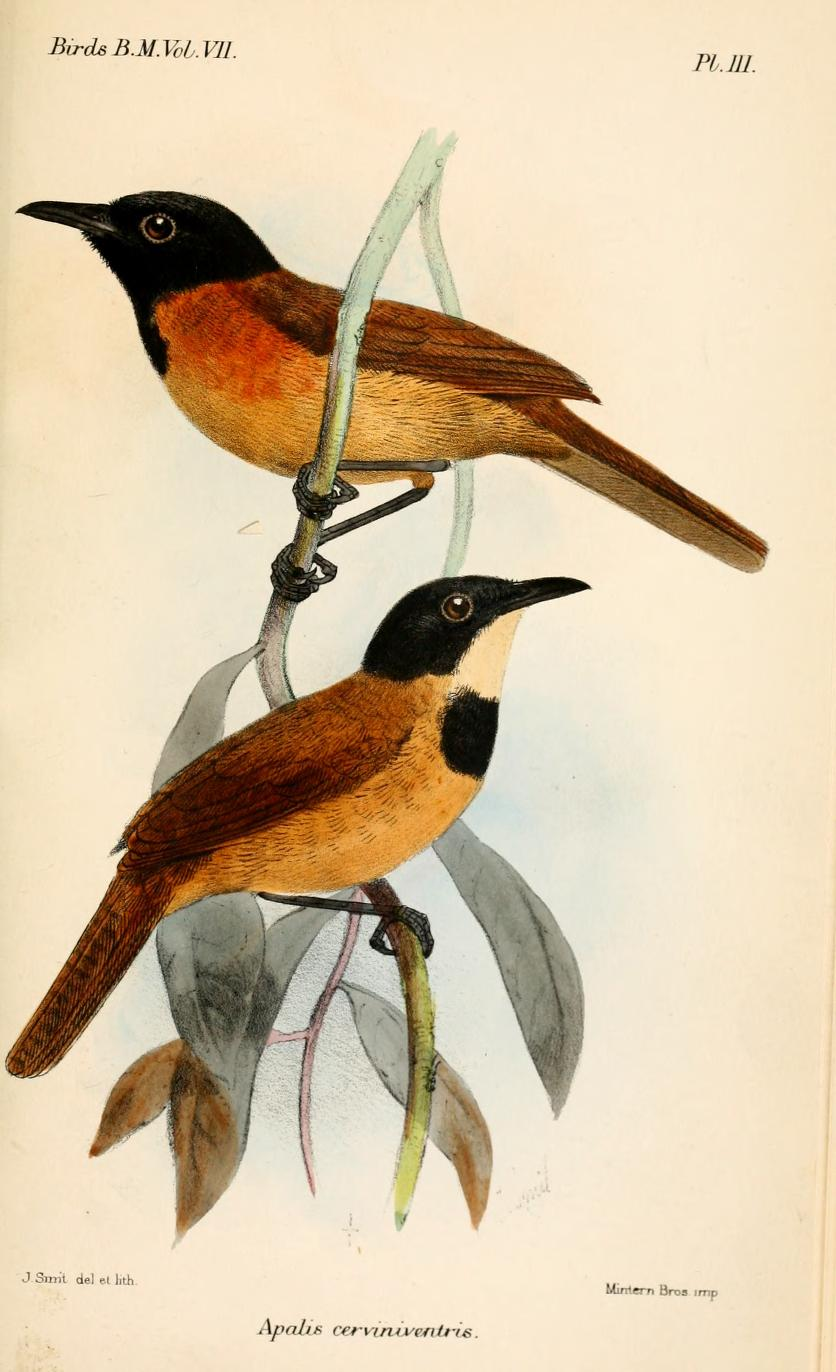
- Illustration by Joseph Smit, 1883

Conservation status
- Data Deficient (IUCN 3.1)

Scientific classification
- Kingdom: Animalia
- Phylum: Chordata
- Class: Aves
- Order: Passeriformes
- Family: Cisticolidae
- Genus: Bathmocercus
- Species: B. cerviniventris

Binomial name
- Bathmocercus cerviniventris (Sharpe, 1877)

Synonyms
- Apalis cerviniventris

= Black-headed rufous warbler =

Species of bird

The black-headed rufous warbler (Bathmocercus cerviniventris), also known as the black-capped rufous warbler, is a species of bird in the family Cisticolidae. It is found in Ivory Coast, Ghana, Guinea, Liberia, and Sierra Leone. Its natural habitats are subtropical or tropical moist lowland forest, subtropical or tropical swampland, and subtropical or tropical moist montane forest. It is threatened by habitat loss.

In 2020, the population of this bird in Liberia was estimated to be 60,000 pairs. The bird is rare in Ghana where there have been only one or two records.
