= Berrick Salome =

Village in Oxfordshire, England

Coordinates: 51.644°N 1.104°W

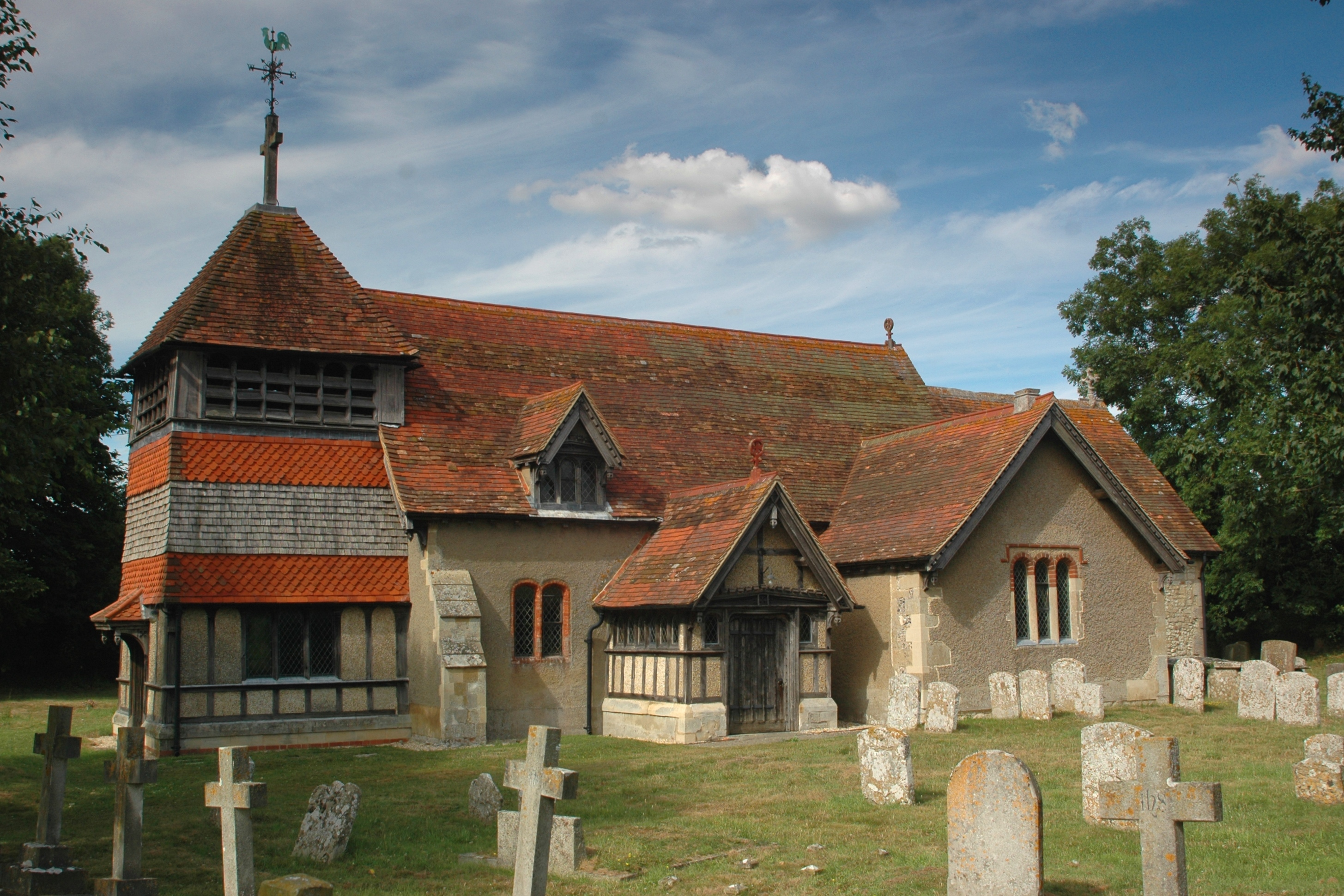
- St Helen's parish church from the south

- Location within Oxfordshire
- Area: 2.95 km^{2} (1.14 sq mi)
- Population: 326 (parish, including Berrick Prior, Roke and Rokemarsh) (2011 Census)
  - Density: 111/km^{2} (290/sq mi)
- OS grid reference: SU6293
- Civil parish: Berrick Salome
- District: South Oxfordshire
- Shire county: Oxfordshire
- Region: South East
- Country: England
- Sovereign state: United Kingdom
- Post town: Wallingford
- Postcode district: OX10
- Dialling code: 01865
- Police: Thames Valley
- Fire: Oxfordshire
- Ambulance: South Central
- UK Parliament: Henley and Thame
- Website: Berrick and Roke Village Website

Berrick Salome /ˈbɛrɪk ˈsæləm/ is a village and civil parish in South Oxfordshire, England, about 3 miles (5 km) north of Wallingford. Since the 1992 boundary changes, the parish has included the whole of Roke and Rokemarsh (previously largely in the parish of Benson) and Berrick Prior (previously part of the parish of Newington). The 2011 Census recorded the parish's population as 326. In 1965, Reginald Ernest Moreau (1897–1970), an eminent ornithologist, and a Berrick Salome resident from 1947, realized that he could build up a picture of the village as it had been in the decades before the First World War, based on the recollections of elderly villagers. His study, which was published in 1968 as The Departed Village: Berrick Salome at the Turn of the Century, also included an introduction to local history. This provided much of the information for "A Village History" which appeared in The Berrick and Roke Millennium Book and is the major source for this article.

== Toponym ==
Berewic is Old English for "barley farm" and Salome is from the surname "Sulham". In the 13th century, Aymar de Sulham held the manor. There is a Britwell Salome about 3 miles (5 km) to the east, and Sulham is a parish in Berkshire near Reading. Prior: Berrick Prior is the corn farm belonging to the Prior of Canterbury (see below: 'Middle Ages'). Liam Tiller gives early versions of the name as Berewiche (1086) and Berewick (1210, 1258). Moreau quotes later versions found in The Place-names of Oxfordshire, as Berrick Sullame (1571), Berwick Sallome (1737, 1797), and, by the time of the 1863 inclosure award, Berrick Salome. In fact, the modern spelling can be found much earlier: the 1830 OS one inch map, reproduced in Ditmas, shows Berwick Salome, though in a smaller typeface than Berwick Prior.

== Geography ==
Berrick seems to have been first settled because it had a reliable source of water. Springs rise to the north-east of the parish at the junction of the Upper Greensand and Gault clay. The most significant of these springs rises near Grove Barn, and is the source of the brook which enters the village along Hollandtide Bottom and flows, culverted in places, past the village pond (which it does not feed) before turning south to run under the forecourt of the Chequers Inn, under the road and across fields, passing east of Lower Berrick Farm and then turning west toward the Thames. Until the mains water was connected in the village, people in the northern part of Berrick drew their water from this brook, outside what is now the Chequers car park, leaning over a railing to scoop the water using what Moreau refers to as a "big dipper" which was kept on the bank there. He also notes that, as late as the 1960s, a resident of Berrick Littleworth could be seen crossing Back Street to draw water from a roadside brook flowing from Hillpit Spring.

== Parish church ==
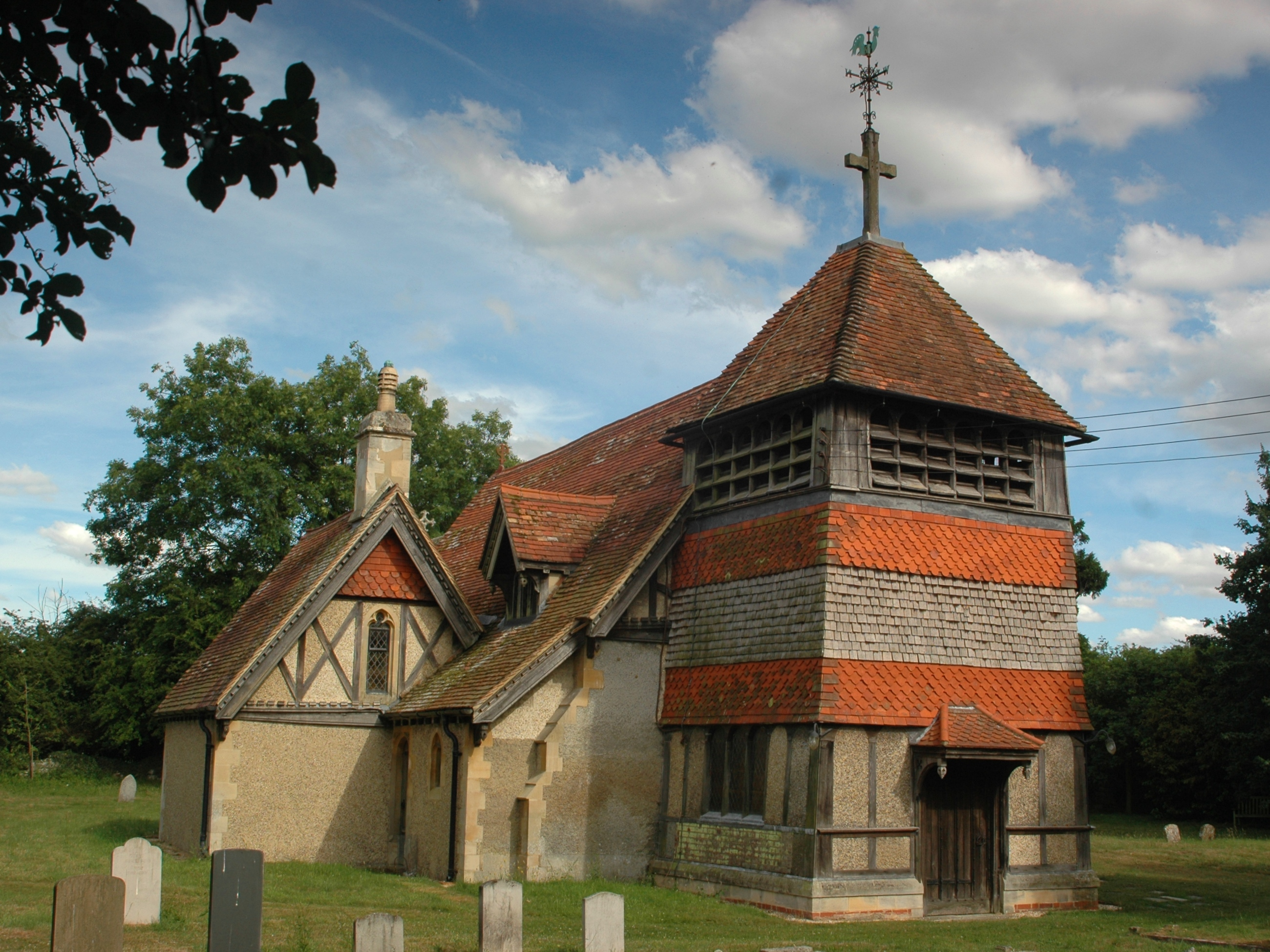
St Helen's from the northwest

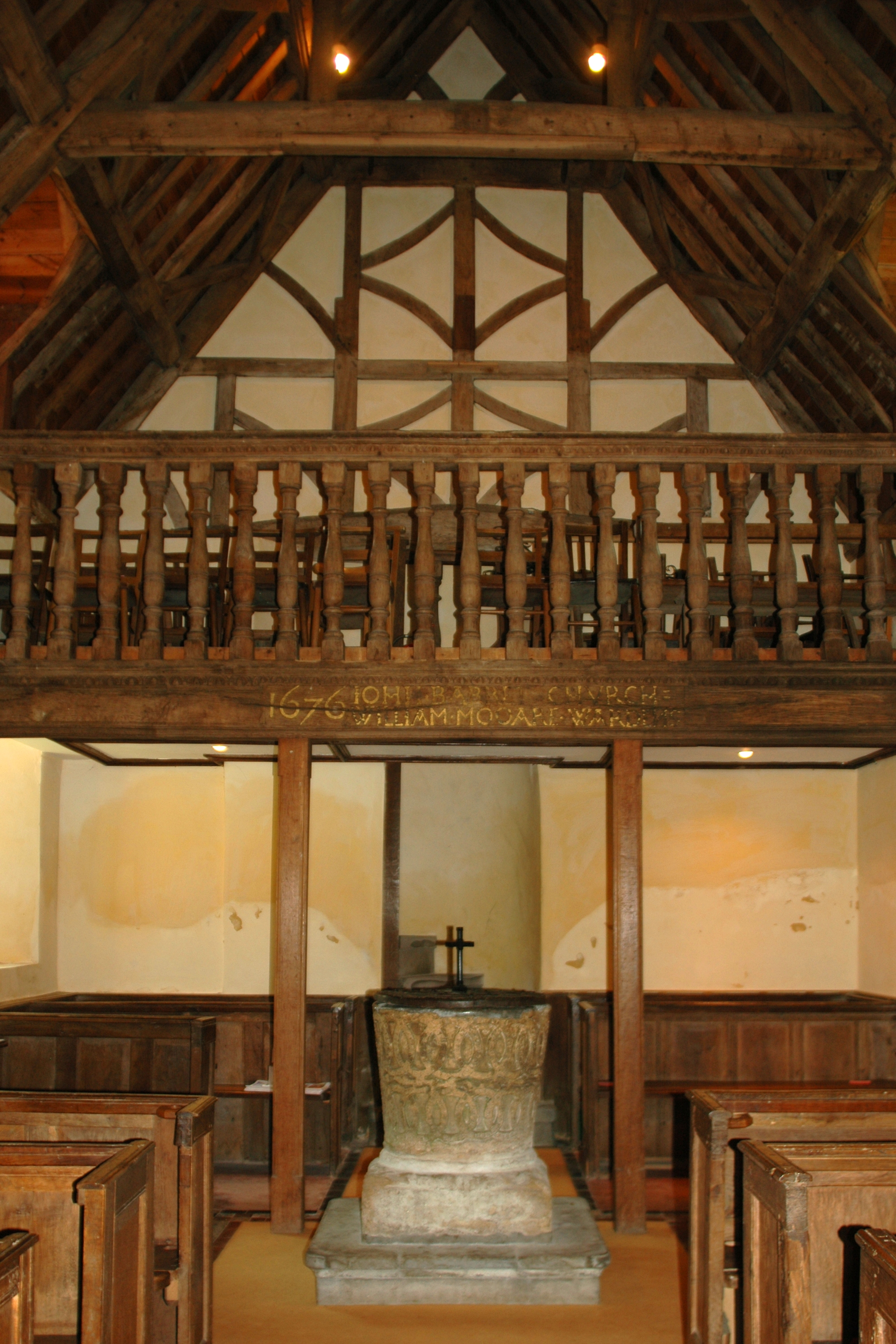
The west end of St Helen's nave, showing the Romanesque font and 17th century west gallery

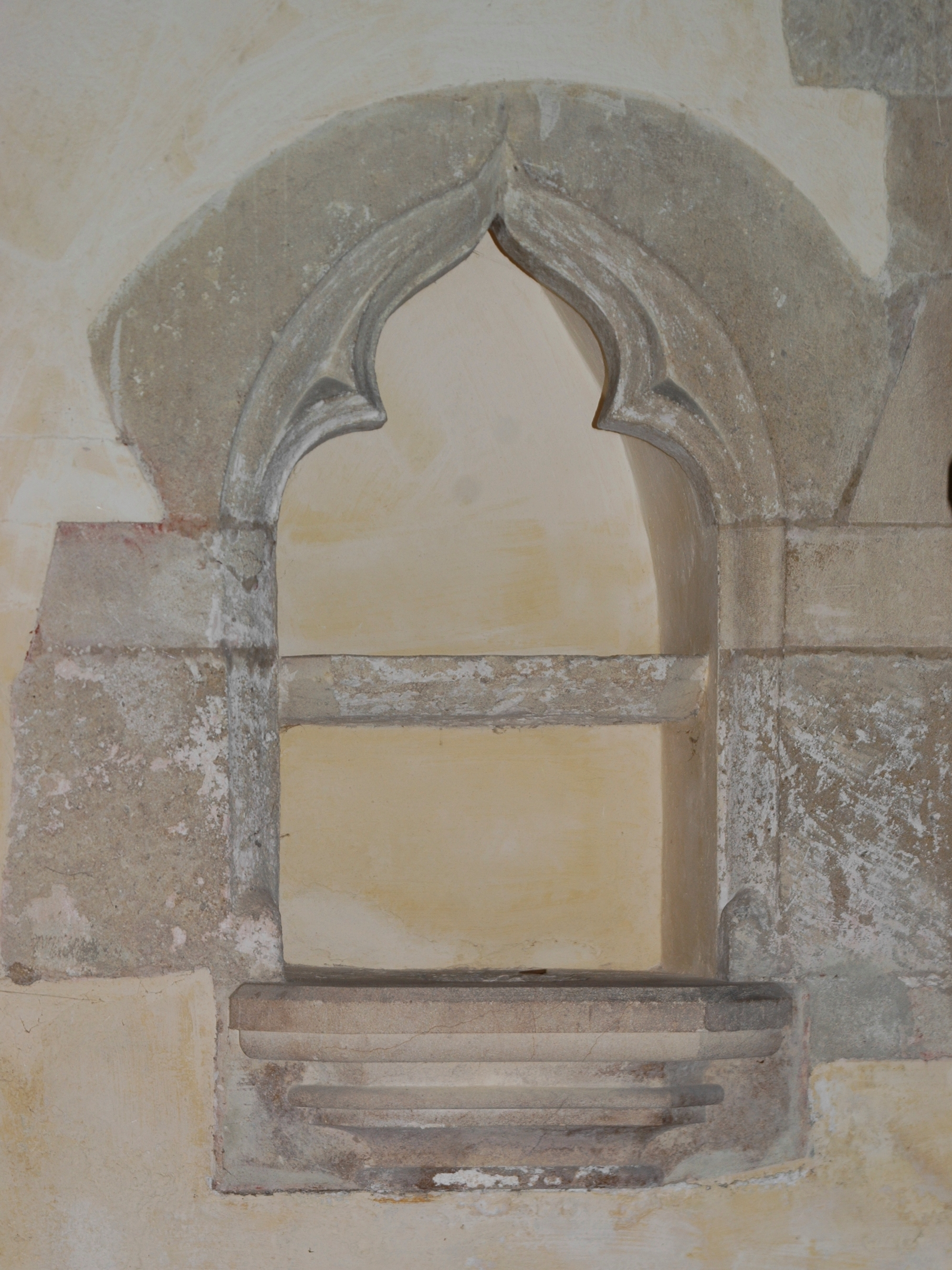
St Helen's 14th-century Decorated Gothic piscina and credence shelf

=== Church history ===
Saint Helen's parish church is about 440 yards (400 m) east of the Chequers, well away from any houses, and at the dead end of a lane which is the surviving part of Keame's Hedge Way, an ancient track closed in the 19th century as part of the inclosure process, which joined the east–west route along Hollandtide Bottom just north of the church. Christine Holmes, in Benson: A Village Through its History identifies a "straight Roman road running east from Dorchester along which the churches of Shirburn, Pyrton, Cuxham, Brightwell Baldwin, Berrick Salome and Warborough all lie". This road would have run through Hollandtide Bottom from Berrick to Brightwell. It has been suggested that, when St Helen's was built, there may have been houses grouped around the church, and that the village centre may have moved later to the junction where the track along Hollandtide Bottom meets routes to Chalgrove, Newington, Warborough, and Benson.

It is uncertain when the church was first established in Berrick but the fact that it is dedicated to Saint Helen suggests that it may have been founded (or refounded) in the late eighth century when King Offa of Mercia recaptured the Benson area from Wessex. Holmes writes "St. Helen – an unusual dedication for Oxfordshire but allegedly a favourite of Offa". Apart from Berrick and Benson churches, there is only one in the county dedicated to St Helen, at Albury (near Thame). There is a view, not universally accepted, that parts of the present building, and, in particular, the font, predate the Norman Conquest of England. The font has interlacing ornament of a style originating in Northumbria in the early days of English Christianity. The architectural historians, Jennifer Sherwood and Nikolaus Pevsner describe the font as Norman, while Liam Tiller comments, "It is surprising that such a high quality font should be found in such a small rural chapel", and suggests that it may have been brought to Berrick from a larger church, perhaps Chalgrove, at a later date. Also, Moreau observes that Berrick church is not included in the Taylors' comprehensive work on Anglo-Saxon architecture.

Saint Helen's, Berrick has long been a chapelry of St Mary's, Chalgrove, and identical lists of incumbents displayed in both churches show that, at least from the 11th century, the two parishes have always had the same priest, although they have had no common boundary since Berrick Prior was transferred to Newington parish in the reign of King Canute (as explained below). Moreau drew attention to another ecclesiastical oddity in the relationship; the incumbent is Vicar of Chalgrove but Rector of Berrick. He/she lives in the vicarage in Chalgrove, more than 2 miles (3 km) from Berrick church, and has no rectory in Berrick. The arrangement of boundaries (See below: '18th and 19th centuries') seems to have caused some uncertainty about parish responsibilities so that, in the middle of the 19th century, "Berrick Salome and Roke had been linked under the ministry of an assistant curate from Benson". At that time, as will be seen below, most of the houses in Roke, but only two in Berrick, fell within Benson parish, and in the same period, as Moreau records, there was an unusual protest against the 'discontinuance and stopping', under the inclosure award of 1853, of Keame's Hedge Way which provided a short cut for the residents of Roke going to Berrick church.

Also unusual is the story Moreau had from the Treasurer of Christ Church, Oxford, about the intervention, in 1853, by the vicar of Beckley, some 15 miles (24 km) away, who persuaded Christ Church to buy a plot of land to build a new church at Berrick Littleworth because "the present church at Berwick is very badly situated for the people at Berwick and very far from Roke". No new church for Berrick was built and control of the land, in Berrick parish, was given to the incumbent of Benson until it was sold over a century later. Perhaps the college preferred not to give control to the then Rector of Berrick, the radical Robert French Laurence, for fear that he would use the land to house the poor.

=== Church building ===
The church is 65 feet (20 m) long and the top of the tower is only about 3 feet (1 m) above the roof of the nave. In 1615, an earlier nave roof was replaced by "one of typical queen-post type with a complex timber truss". In 1676, a wooden gallery was added with dormer windows. "The circular stairway to the gallery at the west end of the central aisle appears to have blocked the doorway to the tower." As there were only 80 'conformists' in Berrick in 1676, the gallery probably provided accommodation for the church choir and band. The names of the churchwardens responsible for both these improvements are recorded on now-faded signs. Sherwood and Pevsner commend the medieval tiles found in the chancel as one of the more notable collections in the county, along with those at Nuffield and Somerton. Saint Helen's has a timber-framed tower, much like that at Drayton St Leonard where there is a "low west tower with a pyramid roof and entirely timber-framed, unusual in Oxfordshire." Waterperry also has a timber-framed tower while Lyford parish church has a wooden bell turret.

"A photograph of Saint Helen's taken just before the restoration in 1890 shows it had then merely been faced with simple weather-boarding carried nearly to the top, where, as now, horizontal apertures were contrived to release the sound of the bells." In 1890, the church was restored under the direction of the architect A. Mardon Mowbray. The Builder magazine criticised the restoration, saying that it "exceeded real necessity", and it was condemned by Sherwood and Pevsner as "a hideous application of all the trappings of fashionable late [19th century] domestic architecture to a church." The tower has a ring of six bells. Henry I Knight of Reading, Berkshire cast the second and fourth bells in 1621. Alexander Rigby of Stamford, Lincolnshire cast the third, fifth and tenor bells in 1692. John Taylor & Sons of Loughborough, Leicestershire cast the treble bell in 1836, presumably at their then foundry in Oxford.

== Economic and social history ==
=== Middle Ages ===
The Domesday Book values Berewiche (Berrick) at £5 a year, compared with £30 and £15 respectively for the neighbouring parishes of Bensingtone (Benson) and Neutone (Newington). The survey enumerates 4 serfs, 10 villeins and 6 bordars; the total population, including wives and children, was probably between 50 and 70. None of the men in the categories listed are freemen; all are within the hierarchy of serfdom, a modified form of slavery. "Villeins typically held land of their own in the village fields, but conditional on payment of dues and provision of labour to the lord of the manor, while bordari [bordars or cottars] usually held smaller holdings, or cottages and surrounding plots only and owed heavy labour services obliging them to work on the lord's demesne", and serfs, the lowest category, although they could not be sold as individuals, could be transferred with the land which they worked.

The northern boundary was set in the early 11th century when a manor, bounded to the south by Hollandtide Bottom, was forfeited to King Canute. He gave it to his wife, Emma of Normandy, who passed it to the Prior of Canterbury. Ditmas shows this transfer as occurring in 997, five years before Emma's first marriage, to Æthelred the Unready. As Newington parish was a peculiar (Note: Chambers Concise 20th Century Dictionary (1985) defines a 'peculiar' as a parish exempt from the jurisdiction of the diocesan bishop) of the Archbishop of Canterbury, the manor, which came to be called Berrick Prior, was taken into that parish, as was Britwell Prior, which seems to have been part of the same gift. With its ecclesiastical connection came exemption from the jurisdiction of the Sheriff of Oxfordshire, and, even into the 20th century, it was still referred to, in some directories, as 'the Liberty of Berrick Prior', although 'liberties' had been abolished in the 19th century. The transfer resulted in the northern boundary of Berrick Salome passing through the centre of the village and taking both the village pub and the village pond into Newington parish.

The village boundaries seem to have developed haphazardly from the earliest times and remained complicated even after the Divided Parishes and Poor Law Amendment Act 1882 which, locally, resolved only the position of some distant water meadows and invasive parts of Benson. A county-wide rationalisation in 1931 sorted out 'amongst others a patchwork of detached elements east of the village. Finally, in 1993, the four hamlets were unified within simple boundaries. Outside its eastern boundary, Berrick Salome parish included five exclaves, all beyond the Ewelme-Chalgrove road, in an area where there were also detached parts of both Benson and Ewelme parishes, while the southern boundary used to wind around the houses in Roke and Rokemarsh so that most of the residents were in Benson. Only the western boundary was relatively simple, but even there, the parish had once included water meadows on the River Thame, south-west of Newington and about 2 miles (3 km) from Berrick. Within the boundaries, there were, in the centre of Berrick, midway between the Chequers and the southern fork, two houses and some plots of land which were detached parts of Benson parish.

=== 18th and 19th centuries ===
St Helen's parish church is the only significant building and, as the Rev George Villiers A.M., rector from 1722 to 1748, reported to a diocesan visitation in 1738, "there is no family of note". Until the Berrick Salome inclosure award was made by the Inclosure Commissioners in 1863, most of the land in the village was still worked on the open field system and there were few enclosed fields. Thomas Newton, who acquired Crowmarsh Battle Farm in 1792, started the move towards enclosure in Berrick. The farm name does not commemorate a local battle; it was recorded in the Domesday Book survey "as land of the church of Labatailge [Battle Abbey]". Newton made "his first documented attempt to promote enclosure at Benson in 1807".

Thomas Newton persisted for decades and, in 1827, promoted a Parliamentary Bill which other farmers opposed. The opposition was led by three substantial farmers: John Franklin of Ewelme, Edward Shrubb of Benson and John Hutchings of Berrick Salome; who were all concerned because "the common fields of Benson were so intermixed with those of Berrick and Ewelme that no measure could succeed unless it dealt with all three parishes." The opposition was successful, largely thanks to the work of their lawyer, George Eyre, of another Ewelme farming family. However the Bill was presented again every November at the start of each new parliamentary session, opposed on each occasion, and in November 1830, local farm workers took part in the Swing Riots which, though directed against enclosures, involved Luddite-style machine breaking. Some of the rioters were punished with transportation.

It was not until 1852, after the death of Thomas Newton, that the inclosure act for Benson, Berrick Salome and Ewelme was finally passed, the Second Annual Inclosure Act 1852 (16 & 17 Vict. c. 3), and the Inclosure Commissioners then took another 11 years to make their award. This must have affected nearly half the households in Berrick Salome, but Moreau found no impression that the change had disrupted village life. And the Inclosure Award did provide two great benefits to the villagers. The first was the allotment of 3 acres, 2 roods and 25 poles (about 1.5 hectares) "unto the Churchwardens and Overseers of the Poor" of Berrick Salome "to be held by them and their successors in trust as a place for exercise and recreation for the inhabitants." In Moreau's day the annual cricket match was still held on this field. In the 19th century and early 20th century when every Saturday afternoon in the cricket season there was a match and Berrick Salome 'never got beat' (according to one old man interviewed by Moreau in the 1960s). The second was the allocation of 2 acres and 10 perches (about 0.84 hectares) to "the Churchwardens and Overseers of the Poor" of Berrick Salome "to be held by them and their successors in trust as an allotment for the labouring poor of the said parish." If his family were not to go hungry, the now landless peasant needed his pig, his garden and his allotment. Until well into the 20th century, few of the rural poor had any employment opportunities other than that as farm labourers.

Another, and less welcome, feature of the Award was the declaration of several dozen traditional roads, ways and tracks (mainly crossing common land) as 'discontinued and stopped'. Writing a century after the Award, Moreau found that resentment of the closure of Keame's Hedge Way was still remembered, and he records that there had been an unsuccessful attempt to keep it open by the curious device of carrying a corpse along the track. It ran south-east from a junction with Hollandtide Bottom, near Church Cottage, past the church, crossing the surviving road to Roke at Berrick Littleworth and emerging in Roke opposite Chapel Lane. While it survived, Keame's Hedge Way provided a more direct and shorter route to church for the residents of Roke. The stretch onwards from Berrick Littleworth remains as a public footpath. Moreau could find no explanation of the name. By the end of the 19th century, rural roads were in poor condition, being poorly maintained by casual labourers who scattered broken stone from local quarries or collected from fields. At that time, steam rollers were not used on rural roads so the loose stones were not compacted into a stable surface. This neglect had a tragic consequence in 1894 when a woman traveller, passing through Berrick, was "killed by falling from a tricycle in consequence of its coming into contact with a large flint." The coroner referred the case to the Watlington Highway Board, with some disapproval.

Rev. Robert French Laurence (1807–85), who was vicar of Chalgrove and Berrick Salome for the last 53 years of his life, was secretary of the local agricultural workers' trades union. He was a social reformer who campaigned for better housing for the agricultural workers and had new thatched cottages built for them in 'the parish' of Chalgrove, presumably, as the vicarage is in that parish. There was, for nearly 30 years, an infant school at Roke, funded by Christ Church, Oxford which held the advowson to the Chalgrove-cum-Berrick living. The school had closed by 1884, after which the infants joined the older children walking to Benson School. Moreau records that boots for that purpose were provided out of Mary White's bequest, a small charitable income left in 1729, to teach reading to the children of the poor in Berrick. Within living memory infant classes were held in the Band Hut.

Moreau recorded five licensed premises selling mainly beer to a local population of about 300 at the turn of the century. Four were within the parish boundaries: The Chequers in Berrick Prior and the Home Sweet Home in Roke were public houses, while the Plough and Harrow in Berrick Salome and The Welcome in Roke were off-licences. The fifth was the Horse and Harrow pub which, although in the centre of Rokemarsh, stood just outside the Berrick parish boundary. There were several small shops and post offices at different times; Moreau records that between 1890 and 1910 four different cottages hosted the Berrick post office. His book includes photos of three of them, one of which is still known as The Old Post Office.

=== 20th century ===
Moreau reported that, at the turn of the century, an adult 'day man' [full-time adult worker] was paid about 12 shillings a week (60p). He commented that this figure that had not increased much for a long time, but it seems possible that his informants understated the rates of pay. "Around this time agricultural wages in Oxfordshire were some of the lowest in the country, on average 14s 6d (72p) a week in 1902". However, the rapid spread of mechanisation, beginning with the appearance of the first tractors shortly before the First World War, brought about a steady decline in the number of farm labourers. As farms became more mechanised, young men sought other employment. Alison Reid writes "By 1930, the Morris car factories at Cowley, reached by bicycle and later by works bus, attracted workers from places as distant as Benson". By 1938 five residents of Berrick were working at Morris Motors. In 1930, the average weekly pay in the motor industry was £3.16s (£3.80), whereas the base rate of pay for agricultural workers set by the Agricultural Wages (Regulation) Act 1924 was £1 11s 8d (£1.58). Some rode motorcycles and bought their petrol from the shop next to the Chequers which at that time met most of the needs of the villagers.

The village is still surrounded by farmland but, by the end of the century, there was only one working farm left in Berrick – Manor Farm – and that was run by the farmer and his wife. There are six other properties which still bear the names of the little farms which used to occupy their sites. Today the cottages of Berrick Salome are likely to be owned and inhabited by business people or independent professionals. By 1999, none was occupied by a farm worker. (Note: MillenniumBook 1999: by reference to the stated occupations of residents of old cottages) After the Second World War, indoor plumbing was introduced. At the turn of the Millennium, according to The Berrick and Roke Millennium Book, there were 18 houses in Berrick Prior, 46 in Berrick Salome, 40 in Roke, and 24 in Rokemarsh. (Note: MillenniumBook 1999: numbers of houses shown on the maps, with The Chequers and Hollandtide Cottage counted as Berrick Prior, and Roke Farm Cottages as Rokemarsh.) The increase in population may be related to the building of the M40 motorway. The M40 was built from London to Stokenchurch in 1967, and extended through the Vale of Oxford in 1974. Thereafter, London was about an hour's journey away.

Other local trades also declined in the 20th century. As noted above, there were five licensed premises in 1900. The Plough and Harrow (now Plough Cottage) and The Welcome closed early in the century, and the Horse and Harrow closed in 1988 after the death of its last landlord, Jim Austin, only a few years before the parish boundary change moved it into Berrick parish. The building is now a private house but retains the name Horse and Harrow. As Moreau mentions, there was a long series of post offices, and other small shops. The last, which closed in the 1980s, was a combined shop and post office in the annexe of the Chequers. Moreau includes a photo of The Chequers showing the shop fascia board, and a drawing of the same view, by David Gentleman, appears as the heading to Moreau's chapter 12. The former shop and post office is now the pub toilets. Another casualty of the same era was the garage at Woodbine Cottage in Roke, generally remembered only for a single derelict petrol pump that was removed in the 1980s. Janette Baker, now living in Rokemarsh, grew up in Roke, in the bungalow next door to Woodbine Cottage, and recalls passing "the garage" on her way home from the school bus.

Queen Emma's gift had the incidental result of putting the Berrick village pond into Newington parish. In the 1930s, according to Moreau, "the person who had acquired the little properties to the north-east of the pond enclosed it [the pond]" and, although the Berrick villagers objected strongly, only Newington had the right to challenge the enclosure under the Commons Act 1876. Newington apparently took no action. In The Berrick and Roke Millennium Book, the owners of the house provide another view of the event. The three little properties had been combined into one by Alan Franklin in the mid-1930s and were sold to a Mrs Hills in 1936. "Rumour has it that she fenced in the drover's pond. However the Title Deeds quite clearly show the pond was included in the land transferred to her."

Berrick Salome's population increased towards the end of the 20th century. The 1901 Census recorded 103 inhabitants, the 1971 Census recorded 99, but the 1981 Census recorded 152 and the 1991 Census recorded 163. These census figures for both population and household numbers relate only to Berrick Salome parish within its pre-1993 boundaries. Moreau reckoned that "around 1900 there were about 75 households in the whole group of hamlets, 35 of them within the boundaries of Berrick Salome parish" and "when I came to live in Berrick Salome in 1947 there were 28 households strictly within the boundaries of the parish, another 8 just outside them to the north in Berrick Prior, about 11 more in the Benson part of Roke, and 14 in Rokemarsh... 61 altogether". He adds that "one block of three [one-up and one-down] cottages, now [in 1968] occupied by one old lady, is said to have at one time housed twenty people". The number of households increased from 36 in the 1971 Census to 52 in the 1981 Census and to 56 in the 1991 Census.

== See also ==
- "Britwell Prior". A Vision of Britain through Time. University of Portsmouth.

== Sources ==
- Anonymous (1926). "An Unspoilt Village, Berrick Prior, Oxfordshire". The Builder. 130: 786–7.
- Anonymous (1999). The Berrick and Roke Millennium Book. Berrick Salome and Roke Parish Council.
- Ditmas, EMR (2009). The Ditmas History of Benson. Wallingford: Pie Powder Press. pp. 193–212.
- Garmondsway, GN, ed. (1953). The Anglo-Saxon Chronicle. London: J. M. Dent & Sons. p. 51.
- Gelling, M (1953–54). The Place-names of Oxfordshire. Vol. Parts 1 & 2. Cambridge: English Place-Name Society.
- Lewchuk, W (1987). American technology and the British vehicle industry. Cambridge: Cambridge University Press. p. 155. ISBN 9780521302692.
- Lobel, Mary D, ed. (1964). A History of the County of Oxford. Victoria County History. Vol. 8: Lewknor and Pyrton Hundreds. London: Oxford University Press for the Institute of Historical Research. pp. 43–55.
- Moreau, RE (1968). The Departed Village: Berrick Salome at the Turn of the Century. Oxford: Oxford University Press. ISBN 0-19-211186-8.
- Miller, GM (1971). BBC Pronouncing Dictionary of British Names. Oxford: Oxford University Press. p. 14.
- Oxfordshire Federation of Women's Institutes (1994). Oxfordshire within living memory. Tackley: Countryside Books. ISBN 1-85306-304-5.
- Pearman, MT (1896). A History of the Manor of Bensington. London: Elliot Stock.
- Salzman, LF, ed. (1939). A History of the County of Oxford. Victoria County History. Vol. 1: Natural history, etc. London: Oxford University Press for the University of London Institute of Historical Research.
- Sharp, Thomas (1948). Oxford Replanned. London: The Architectural Press.
- Sherwood, Jennifer; Pevsner, Nikolaus (1974). Oxfordshire. The Buildings of England. Harmondsworth: Penguin Books. ISBN 0-14-071045-0.
- Soper, Mike (1995). Years of Change. Ipswich: Farming Press Ltd. ISBN 0-85236-313-3.
- Taylor, HM; Taylor, J (1965). Anglo-Saxon Architecture. Oxford: Oxford University Press.
- Tiller, Kate, ed. (1999). Benson: A Village Through its History. Wallingford: Pie Powder Press. ISBN 0-948598-10-7.
- Tiller, Liam (2011). "The Restoration of Berrick Salome Church". Oxoniensia. LXXVI. Oxfordshire Architectural and Historical Society: 81–94. ISSN 0308-5562.
