= Avian clutch size =

Number of bird eggs laid in one brood

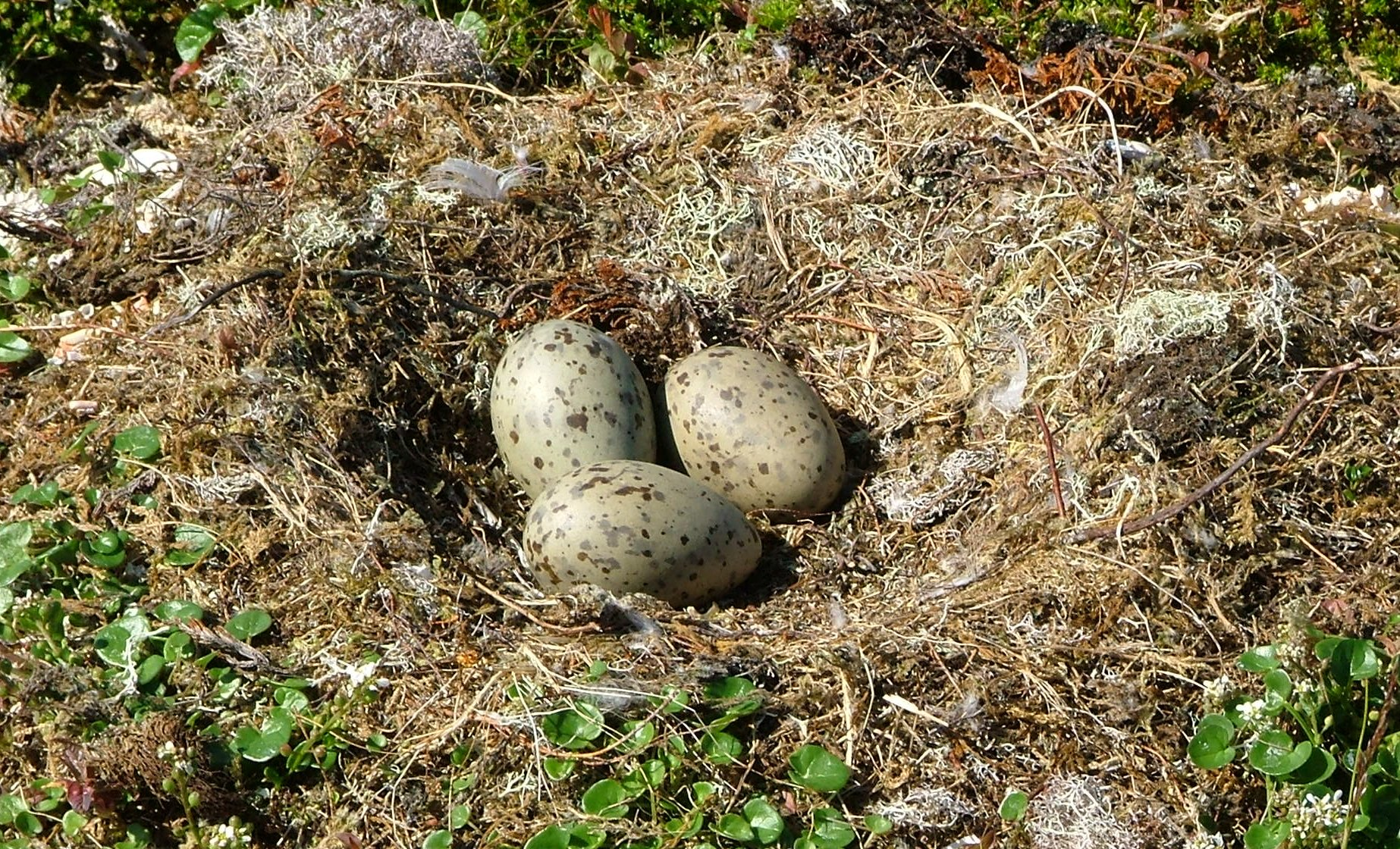
Great Black-backed Gull (Larus marinus), small clutch.

Clutch size refers to the number of eggs laid in a single brood by a nesting pair of birds. The numbers laid by a particular species in a given location are usually well defined by evolutionary trade-offs with many factors involved, including resource availability and energetic constraints. Several patterns of variation have been noted and the relationship between latitude and clutch size has been a topic of interest in avian reproduction and evolution. David Lack and R.E. Moreau were among the first to investigate the effect of latitude on the number of eggs per nest. Since Lack's first paper in the mid-1940s there has been extensive research on the pattern of increasing clutch size with increasing latitude. The proximate and ultimate causes for this pattern have been a subject of intense debate involving the development of ideas on group, individual, and gene-centric views of selection.

== Food limitation and nest predation hypotheses ==
David Lack observed a direct relationship between latitude and avian clutch size. Comparable bird species near the equator laid approximately half as many eggs as those that resided in northern temperate habitats. He observed an increasing clutch-size from the equator towards the poles (something he referred to as the “latitude trend”) for many passerine (perching) birds, near-passerine (tree-dwelling) birds and in various other groups: Strigiformes, Falconiformes, Ciconiiformes, Laridae, Ralliformes, Galliformes, Podicipedifomes, and Glareolidae, and in some Limicolae. He proposed the Food Limitation Hypothesis in an attempt to explain this unique pattern. The hypothesis states that avian clutch size differences arise from differences in food availability. Nature favours clutch sizes that correspond to the average maximum number of offspring that the parent can sustain given a limited food supply. Thus, the shortage of food supply in tropical habitats (near the equator) limits avian clutch size. Furthermore, the higher abundance of predators near the equator as compared to regions near the poles gave rise to the Nest Predation Hypothesis. High rates of nest predation may select for smaller clutches to reduce the parental investment in a single nesting attempt. Moreover, larger clutches are more likely to be spotted by predators due to an increased rate of food delivery by the parent. This increase in parental activity will increase the probability that predators will locate nests. Various studies have been performed to find supporting evidence for these two hypotheses. One theoretical research study suggested that the latitudinal gradient in clutch size can be explained by the increasing seasonality of resources from the tropics to the poles by itself or in conjunction with a decreasing rate of predation and breeding season. However, field studies have provided little support for either of these hypotheses. It is clear that Lack's Food Limitation Hypothesis and the Nest Predation Hypothesis are plausible explanations for explaining the latitudinal variation in avian clutch size. However, further analysis is required as field studies have provided little support for these hypotheses.

== Skutch's Hypothesis ==
Skutch's Hypothesis is similar to the Nest Predation Hypothesis as it states that higher nest predation decreases the rate at which birds can deliver food to their offspring and thus limits clutch size. Few field studies have been published on this hypothesis. A study in Panamá, where predation rates are high, directly compared activity which was much greater during the nestling (feeding young) stage than during incubation, and found no support for greater predation rates with greater activity. In another study, researchers analyzed if the rates of food delivery and nest predation explain the variation in clutch size observed among species between and within South and North America. They analyzed whether Skutch's Hypothesis explained clutch size differences within or between latitudes. The study analyzed bird populations in large intact forests in Arizona, United States (with 7,284 nests) and subtropical Argentina where they monitored 1,331 nests. They found that clutches were larger in Arizona (4.61 eggs/nest) than in Argentina (2.58 eggs/nest) and that Skutch's Hypothesis explained the variation in clutch size within each, North and South America, but did not explain the latitudinal difference in clutch size. In Argentina, the number of offspring was half that of Arizona, yet parents were bringing food to their young at greater rates in Argentina.Therefore, clutch size in southern areas cannot be explained by predation rates or food delivery. The authors of the study suggested analyzing parental mortality rates in southern and northern climates in addition to considering Skutch's theory. Therefore, Skutch's Hypothesis - by itself - is not an accurate predictor of the latitudinal clutch size trend and evidence for it remain equivocal.

== Ashmole's Hypothesis ==
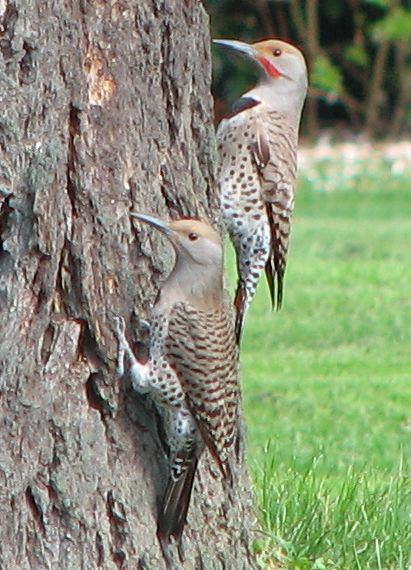
Red-shafted Northern Flicker: female (left), male (right).

The latitudinal variation in clutch size is influenced by the food abundance per unit area of habitat. More specifically, during the reproductive season, clutch size and food abundance are directly proportional to one another relative to the density of bird populations (abundance per unit area of habitat). If food resources are not abundant during the reproductive season, then natural selection would not favour large clutches since food for the offspring would be a limiting resource. However, if food resources were abundant during the breeding season, and everything else stayed constant, raising a larger clutch would be possible. Clutch size depends on the relative, not absolute, level of resource availability during the breeding season. Since at higher latitudes, there is a large increase in resource productivity during the spring and summer in comparison to the equatorial tropical regions, localities near the poles should theoretically have larger clutch sizes. According to Ashmole's hypothesis, there should be uniformity of clutch size within a region since the seasonality of resource production should have the same effect on all the bird species in that particular locality. Most importantly, under Ashmole's hypothesis, average avian clutch size should decrease as resource productivity increases during the non-breeding season. Namely, the higher the productivity during the non-breeding season, the smaller the clutch size. A study by Koenig (1984) supports this observation. The study tabulated the sizes of 411 clutches of Northern Flickers (Colaptes auratus) across a wide range of localities in North America. The study found that as the localities become more resource abundant in the winter, clutch size significantly declines. As predicted by Ashmole's hypothesis, the study also found that Colaptes auratus clutch size is unaffected by the absolute resource productivity during the breeding season. Avian clutch size should be proportional to breeding season resource productivity per breeding pair of birds. This relationship has been found in a series of studies from Alaska and Costa Rica.

According to Ashmole's Hypothesis, the clutch size of resident birds is proportional to the level of competition with migrant birds. This is due to the fact that competition between migrant birds and resident (i.e. non-migrant) birds leads to greater mortality among resident birds. The resultant lower competition during the reproductive season enables the resident birds that survived to lay larger eggs. A study performed supported this hypothesis. In the study, they compared the evolutionary history of birds inhabiting Australia, Southern Africa and India because these regions have different proportions of migrants. India had the largest proportion of migrants while Australia had the smallest. The study found that clutch size was significantly higher in India than in the other two regions (Australia, Southern Africa). Furthermore, the study tested whether there exists a negative relationship between clutch size and the length of the breeding season (i.e. the larger the clutch size the shorter the breeding season). The length of the reproductive season was greater in Australia than in India (with South Africa having a breeding season lower than Australia but higher than India). The researchers attributed the differences in the clutch size of resident birds to the larger proportion of Palearctic migrants wintering in India. The differences that the study found in terms of the length of breeding seasons were accounted for by differences in the climatic characteristics between the regions.

== Environmental seasonality ==
As latitude increases, clutch size and seasonality also increase. The clutch size of birds occupying environments with low seasonal variations are smaller than those of birds residing in habitats that depict greater seasonality. Highly seasonal environments force birds to survive periods of low temperatures and reduced food availability during the non-reproductive season which causes increases in parental mortality. As well, the risk of adult mortality is increased in seasonal environments due to the need for avian species to migrate. The combination of increased parental mortality during the non-breeding season and food abundance during the reproductive season has favoured the evolution of larger clutches in seasonal environments. Producing more eggs during the reproductive season increases the individual fitness during the periods of reduced food availability. The greater the fluctuation in resource availability, the greater the tendency for avian species to increase their clutch size. Since seasonality increases with latitude, avian clutch size increases in environments that are closer to the poles. In some cases, seasonality is also affected by longitude. Eastern Europe is more seasonal than Western Europe. Given the effects of seasonality on clutch size, birds in Eastern Europe tend to have larger clutch sizes than birds in Western Europe. However, the only avian species that show this longitudinal pattern are the ones that also show the latitudinal trend.

== Day length ==
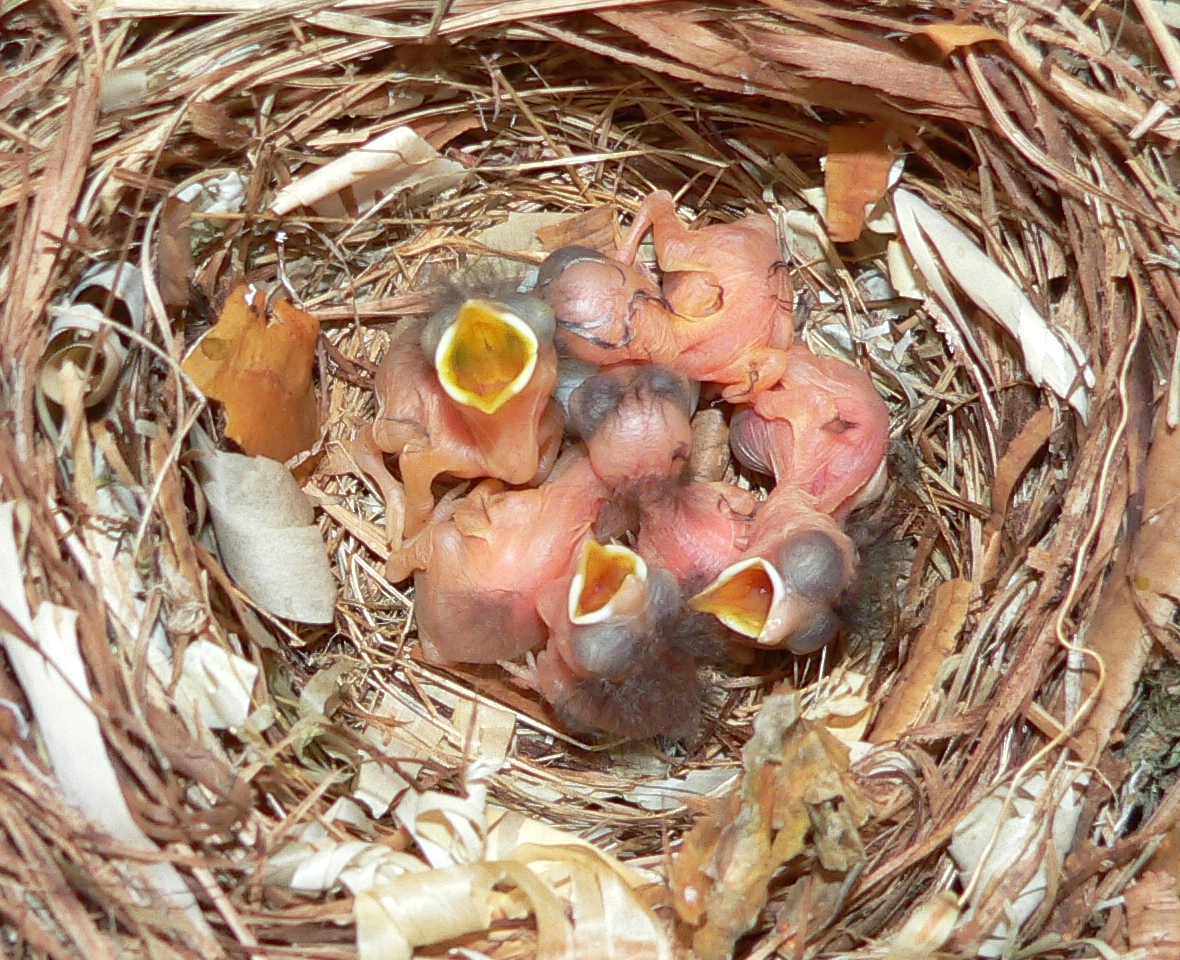
Pied Flycatcher chicks in Finland.

As day length increases the size of the clutch also increase. Generally, a longer day enables parents to find more food per day and thus, sustain more offspring at one time. Several studies have found convincing evidence to support this observation. A study that looked at the geographical trends in breeding parameters of Pied Flycatcher (Ficedula hypoleuca) in the Western Palearctic found that the latitudinal clutch size variation depends on the duration of the working day and the energy requirement of the chicks. However, the energy requirement of the brood and parents could generate the latitudinal clutch size pattern in Ficedula hypoleuca as long as temperature and working day effects were considered. If photoperiod were a factor in the determination of clutch size in every avian species then nocturnal owls should show the opposite trend. Namely, their clutch size should decrease as day length increases. A field study was performed to examine nesting provisioning rates of Tengmalm's Owls in two populations at different latitudes (Finland 63 degrees N and Czech Republic 50 degrees N) and thus different day lengths. The study suggested that nocturnal owl species clutch size at higher latitudes were constrained by short nights during the breeding season which limited the number of offspring they could raise. Furthermore, owls at northern latitudes were constrained by the yearly fluctuation of resources. Both of these factors are likely to influence the reproductive investment in owl species. However, other studies have not shown that photoperiod is a factor in determining nocturnal avian species clutch size. Therefore, further studies regarding clutch size in nocturnal species are needed as it still remains unclear how latitude is linked with parental investment.

== Egg-viability hypothesis ==
Temperature is a possible factor that could explain the pattern in latitude and seasonal trends in clutch size. Since temperature varies with geographical location and time of year, it is possible that seasonal patterns in clutch size are affected by physiological processes that are temperature dependent. The egg-viability hypothesis states that high temperatures favour small clutches because of a reduction in egg viability. This explains the reason why when Red-winged Blackbirds – which are open nesters - lay large eggs at low latitudes, female birds initiate clutch incubation before the clutch completion. Under circumstances where eggs are exposed to high temperatures (26 degrees C and 36 degrees C), they will be less likely to hatch. Some birds will even eject eggs in response to extreme weather conditions. The other possibility under high temperatures is that female birds will initiate incubation earlier in the laying sequence and consequently this will result in asynchronous hatching which would lead to a reduced brood size. This earlier incubation may also shorten the nesting cycle by decreasing the time between clutch completion and egg hatching.

== Nest type ==
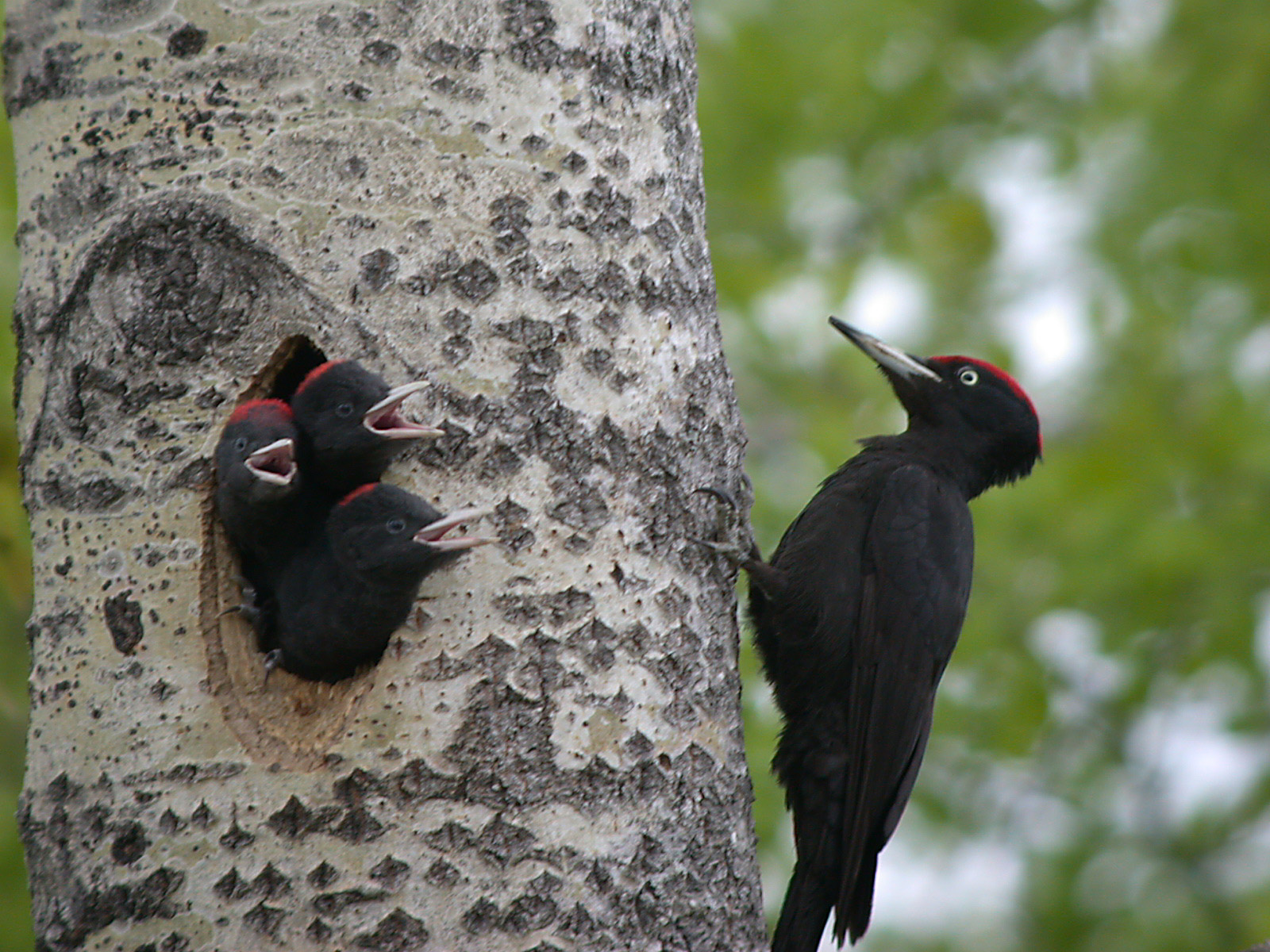
Woodpeckers are capable of excavating their own cavity nests.

A strong intrinsic determinant of clutch size is nest type. Open nesters tend to be exposed to higher rates of nest predation in comparison to cavity nesters (e.g. woodpeckers). Thus, open nesters tend to have smaller clutch sizes. Half-open nests have clutch sizes that lie in between open nesters and cavity nesters. There are two major hypotheses that attempt to explain variation in clutch size among cavity-nesting bird species. The nest site limitation hypothesis states that weak excavators invest more energy in each breeding attempt and thus lay larger clutches because their nesting opportunities are more limited. The other competing hypothesis is that clutch size among cavity – nesting birds could be determined by diet. The clutch size of strong excavators may be larger because they are able to specialize on a more seasonally stable food source. Annual stability of food resources tends to have a larger impact on the variation of clutch size in excavators. Limitation of nest sites has a much more limited impact but is still relevant in determining clutch size variation among excavators.

== Exceptions ==
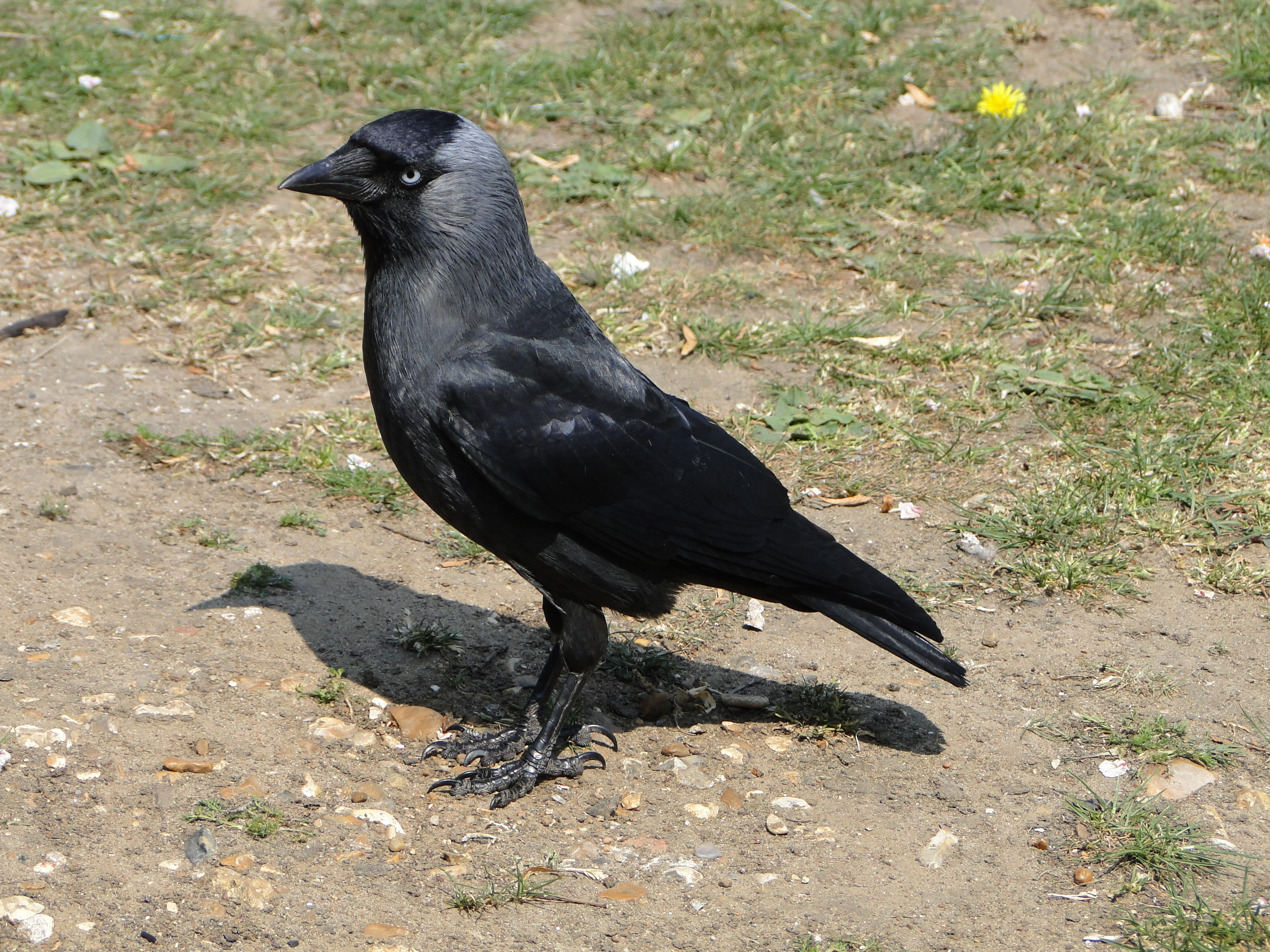
Western Jackdaw in London, England.

Some avian species do not conform to the general clutch-latitude relationship where clutch size and latitude are proportional to one another (i.e. as latitude increases, clutch size increases). A field study was performed on a single-brooded hole nesting bird by examining 228 Jackdaw (Corvus monedula) nests. The data were collected between 1979 and 1983 in Hoya de Guadix (a region that is north of the province Granada in Spain). The study found that the Jackdaw was an exception to the general clutch size-latitude trend. In fact, they found that increases in latitude decreased the clutch size of this bird species. However, the accuracy of this study can be questioned as the results were observed in one small region (i.e. Hoya de Guadix). Another study looked at seven widespread single-brooded British birds at numerous localities across Britain. The study found that seasonal clutch size declines were not related to latitudinal gradients. However, the researchers found strong seasonal declines in clutch size. Moreover, of the three environmental variables that they analyzed (daylight, plant productivity and seasonality), they found that daylight had the most influence on clutch size. The study found little evidence for the direct proportionality between clutch size and latitude.

== See also ==
- Lack's principle
