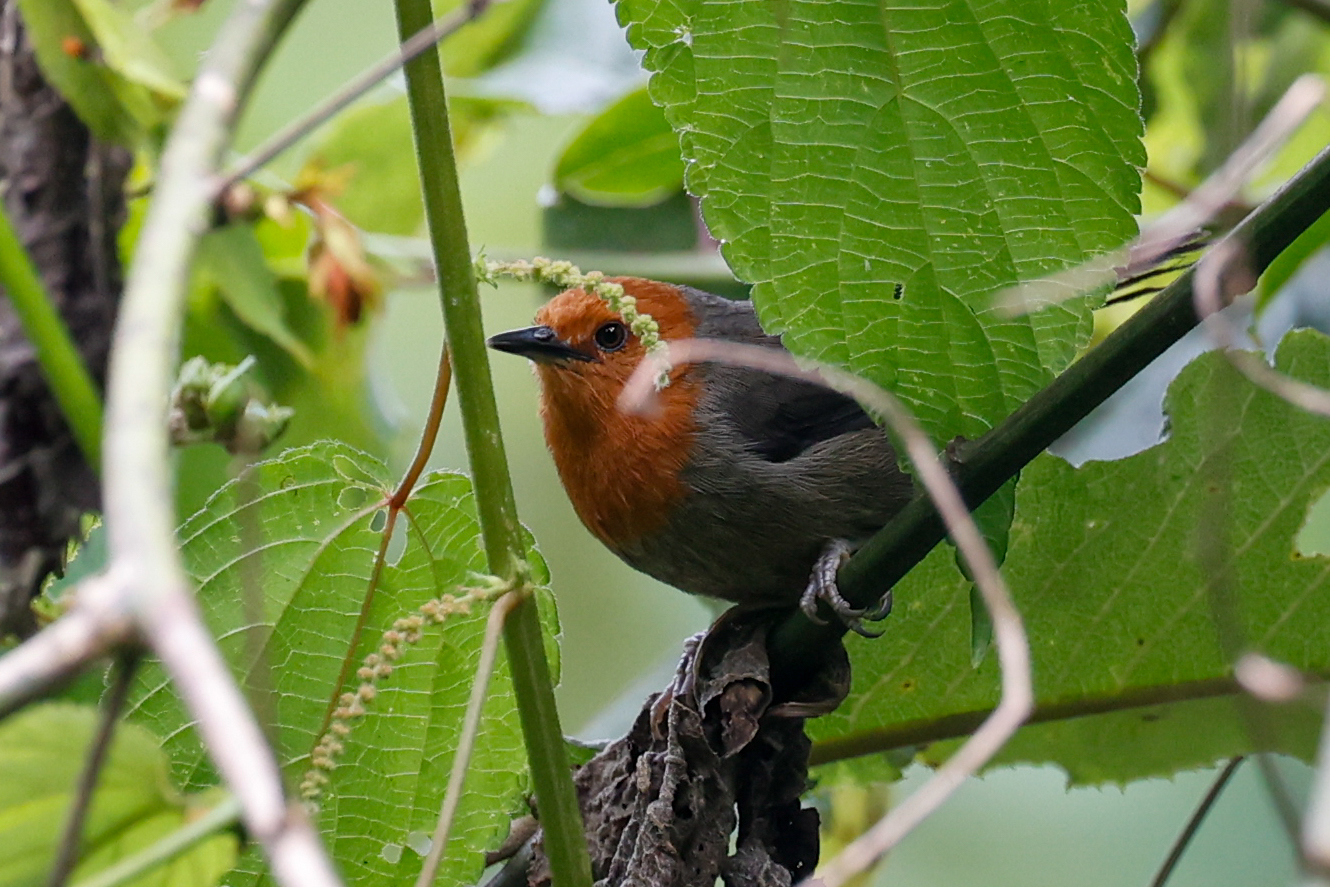

Conservation status
- Near Threatened (IUCN 3.1)

Scientific classification
- Kingdom: Animalia
- Phylum: Chordata
- Class: Aves
- Order: Passeriformes
- Family: Cisticolidae
- Genus: Scepomycter; Grant & Mackworth-Praed, 1941
- Species: S. winifredae

Binomial name
- Scepomycter winifredae (Moreau, 1938)

Synonyms
- Bathmocercus winifredae Artisornis winifredae (protonym)

= Winifred's warbler =

Species of bird

Winifred's warbler (Scepomycter winifredae), also known as Mrs. Moreau's warbler, is a species of bird in the family Cisticolidae. It is the only species placed in the genus Scepomycter. It was first recorded and named by the ornithologist Reginald Moreau after his wife, Winifred Muriel Moreau née Bradberry.

== Taxonomy ==
Winifred's warbler was formally described in 1938 by English civil servant and ornithologist Reginald Moreau based on a juvenile specimen collected in the Kinole forest in eastern Tanzania. He placed the species in the genus Artisornis and coined the binomial name Artisornis winifredae. He chose the specific epithet to honour his wife Winifred Muriel Moreau (1891-1981). Moreau later described an adult specimen. Winifred's warbler has sometimes been placed in the genus Bathmocercus, but is now the only species placed in the genus Scepomycter that was introduced in 1941 by the ornithologists Claude Grant and Cyril Mackworth-Praed. The genus name combines Ancient Greek σκεπας/skepas, σκεπαος/skepaos meaning "covering" or "shelter" with μυκτηρ/muktēr, μυκτηρος/muktēros meaning "nostril".

Two subspecies are recognised:

- S. w. winifredae (Moreau, 1938) – Uluguru Mountains of east Tanzania
- S. w. rubehoensis Bowie & Fjeldså & Kiure, 2009 – Rubeho-Ukaguru Mountains of Tanzania

The subspecies S. w. rubehoensis has sometimes been considered as a separate species, the Rubeho warbler.

== Description ==
The bird is mostly olive green above with the forehead and crown being rufous brown as are the sides of the head and chest. The chin is whitish.

Winifred's warbler is listed as near threatened, due to habitat loss.
