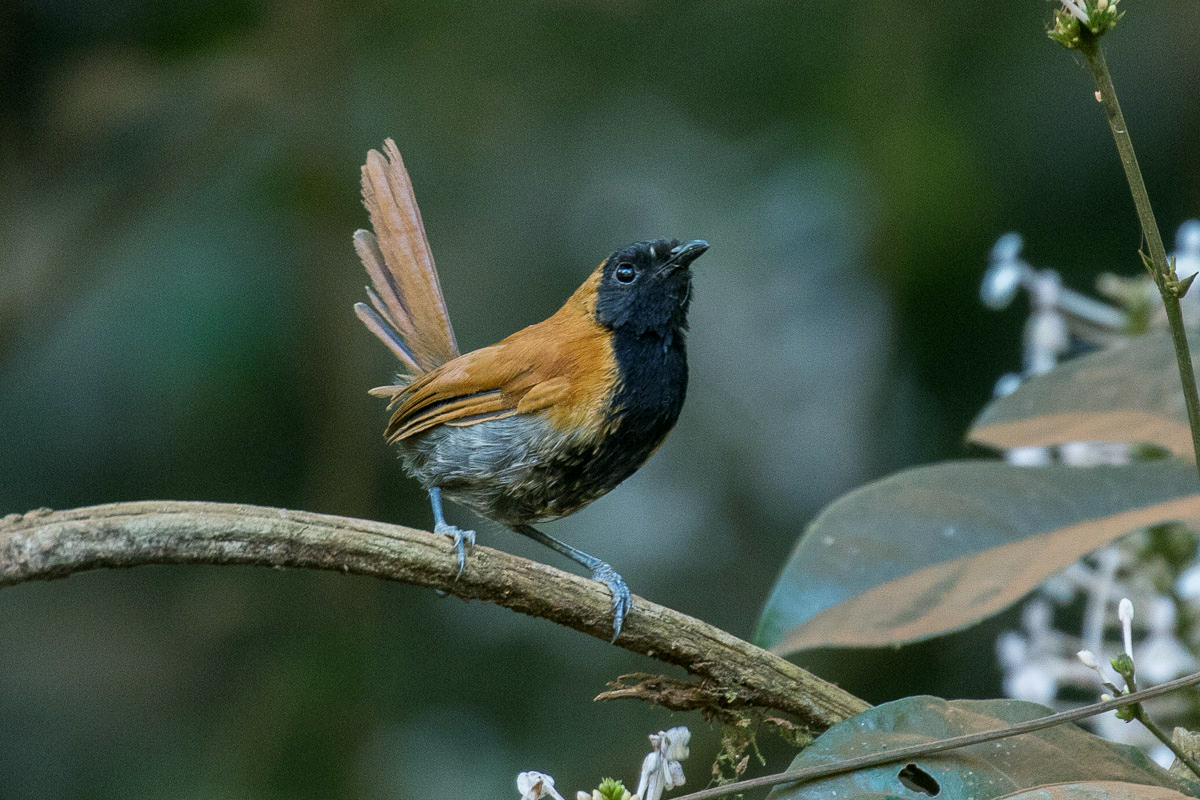
- A Black-faced rufous warbler in Kakamega Forest, Kenya

Conservation status
- Least Concern (IUCN 3.1)

Scientific classification
- Kingdom: Animalia
- Phylum: Chordata
- Class: Aves
- Order: Passeriformes
- Family: Cisticolidae
- Genus: Bathmocercus
- Species: B. rufus

Binomial name
- Bathmocercus rufus Reichenow, 1895

= Black-faced rufous warbler =

Species of bird

The black-faced rufous warbler (Bathmocercus rufus) is a species of bird in the family Cisticolidae. It is found in Cameroon, Central African Republic, Republic of the Congo, Democratic Republic of the Congo, Equatorial Guinea, Gabon, Kenya, Rwanda, South Sudan, Tanzania, and Uganda. Its natural habitats are subtropical or tropical moist lowland forest and subtropical or tropical moist montane forest.
