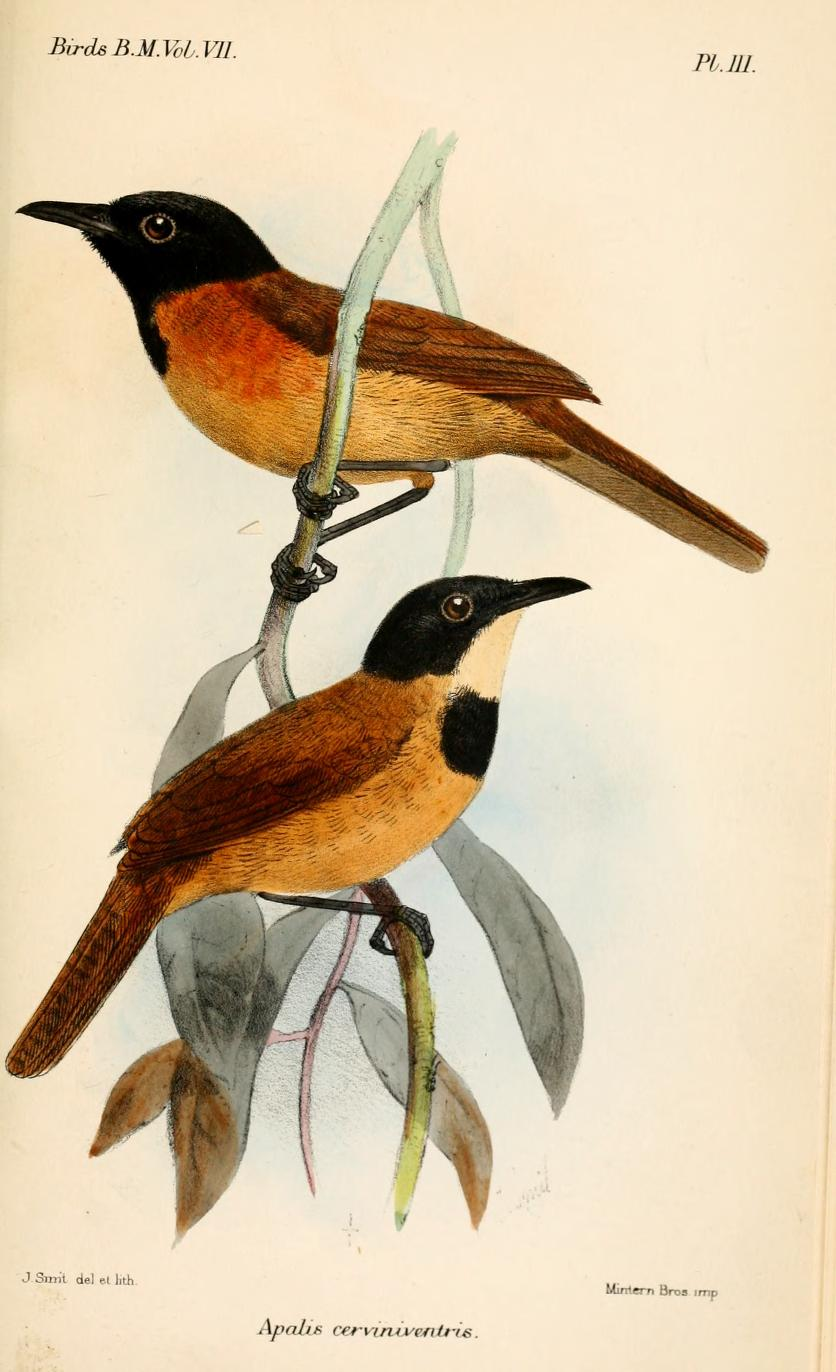
- Black-headed rufous warbler (Bathmocercus cerviniventris)

Scientific classification
- Kingdom: Animalia
- Phylum: Chordata
- Class: Aves
- Order: Passeriformes
- Family: Cisticolidae
- Genus: Bathmocercus; Reichenow, 1895

Type species
- Bathmocercus rufus Reichenow, 1895

= Bathmocercus =

Genus of birds

Bathmocercus is a genus of bird in the family Cisticolidae. It contains the following species:

- Black-headed rufous warbler (Bathmocercus cerviniventris)
- Black-faced rufous warbler (Bathmocercus rufus)

Species from the genus Scepomycter are sometimes placed in this genus though several marked morphological differences are used to justify its separation.
