= Reginald Ernest Moreau =

English civil servant (1897–1970)

Reginald "Reg" Ernest Moreau (29 May 1897 – 30 May 1970) was an English civil servant who worked as an accountant in Tanganyika (now Tanzania) and later contributed to ornithology. He also made studies on the migration of birds between Europe and Africa; and on clutch size in nesting birds, compared the life-histories of birds in different latitudes and was a pioneer in the introduction of quantitative approaches to the study of birds. He was also a long time editor of the ornithological journal Ibis. He published two major books, The Palaearctic-African Bird Migration Systems (1972) and The Bird Faunas of Africa and its Islands (1966).

== Early life ==
Moreau was born on 29 May 1897 near Norbiton Gate at Kingston upon Thames. His father worked in the stock exchange while his mother's family ran a baker's business in Kingston. The family name was derived from an ancestral French immigrant who had moved to Bayswater as a bookseller. In his autobiographical note published in the Ibis upon his death, he notes that nobody in his family had any academic interests or an interest in natural history. He went to a local preparatory school and became interested in birds through Cherry Kearton's books With Nature and a Camera and Our Bird Friends. He however did not relate to the birdlife around him. His secondary schooling was at Kingston Grammar School. Around this time he injured his right wrist and had to learn to write with his left hand. His father was hit by the open door of a speeding train and the injury led to a nervous breakdown with periodic episodes of manic-depression. The burden of earning and care of the family now went to Moreau's mother but in 1907 they moved from Kingston to Rowledge on the edge of Alice Holt Forest and then in 1913 to Farnham. In his teens he began exploring the neighbourhood on bicycle and through the books of William Henry Hudson took an interest in observing the local birds. In 1914 he wrote the Executive Class Examination for entrance to the Home Civil Service and made it into the 99th place among 100 available positions although his bad eyesight and poor health made him nearly fail. He received a posting in September 1914 at a war office and his job was to scrutinize applications for separation allowance. A year later he was posted at the Army Audit Office in Aldershot. The clerical work for the next five years was interrupted by rheumatoid arthritis. His family doctor suggested that he needed a "complete change". He applied for a transfer to the Army Audit Department in Cairo and got one in 1920.

== Egypt ==
Moreau was a member of the RSPB through which he met Michael John Nicoll, the director at the Giza Zoological Gardens. Due to security problems in Egypt, he had to wear military uniform, something he was very uncomfortable with. The work was only from 8 AM to 2 PM after which he would often go to the hot springs at Helwan. His health improved rapidly. Nicoll, a member of the BOU, was a regular contact but the two never made any field excursions together. Moreau however began to make many weekend excursions. A bout of paratyphoid hospitalised him briefly during September 1920 and during this period he observed a number of migrant birds. He later hired a donkey to make weekend trips. There were fears that lone British travellers would be captured by Egyptian nationalists but he found only friendly company and picked up Arabic. In one of his jaunts to a distant wadi he came to meet C. B. Williams, an entomologist at the Egyptian agriculture ministry. Williams became a close friend and he was introduced to scientific ideas and the two made many excursions into the desert. Williams also encouraged Moreau to publish his bird notes in the Ibis journal, with help in preparing the manuscripts. The drafts were typed by Williams' wife. At Alexandria one March, he spotted a lady picking up buttercups among the wheatears and larks that he was observing and found her knowledgeable about birds. After meeting her, Winifred Muriel Bradberry also known as Winnie, a couple more times, he married her in June 1924 at Cumberland. The young couple preferred to live at Maadi close to Wadi Digha where they kept a pet raven and conducted experiments to see if the plumage colours of larks were genetically inherited. They had a daughter whom they named Prinia after a small bird, the Graceful Prinia (Prinia gracilis). A Graceful Prinia had built a nest in the ventilator of the bell tent that was the Moreaus' first marital home. (The bird genus name Buphagus was initially suggested as the name for their son David.) Moreau made trips around Africa and wrote on birds as well as letters to the New Statesman. He also wrote some fiction such as The Temple Servant under the pen name of "E. R. Morrough" as, being a civil servant, he was not allowed to publish books. They travelled around Africa and in 1928 C.B. Williams moved to Amani in Tanganyika as Deputy Directory of a research station there and recommended that Moreau should take up work in the accounts department.

== Amani ==
The Moreaus moved in March 1928 from the desert to the rainforests of the Usambara Mountains with their children David and Prinia. They often suffered from malaria and dysentery. Here, however he had access to a library and soon became librarian and also took up the editorial role of the East African Agricultural Journal. He did not have access to any books on the birds of the region until Admiral Hubert Lynes gave him a copy of Anton Reichenow's Vogel Afrikas. Still later Arthur Loveridge who employed a part-time native collector Salimu Asmani asked Moreau if Salimu could be employed. Salimu turned out to be a very good observer. The British Museum hardly had bird specimens from this region which was largely German controlled. Through C.B. Williams' efforts, some funds were diverted to help employ Salimu, Charles Abdallah and other African assistants. Through these assistants, Moreau obtained notes on incubation, feeding and collected a mass of data on bird nesting. In 1931 a species of bird that he collected was named after him by W.L. Sclater as Artisornis moreaui. In 1938 Moreau discovered another species of warbler which he named after his wife, initially as another species of Artisornis but later as Scepomycter winifredae. The Moreau's were also among the first Europeans to note the joking relationships or the utani system that connected tribes in East Africa. In 1934 the station was visited by David Lack and in 1939 by W. H. Thorpe and his wife. Thorpe had made the trip to find a giant coccid. In 1936 they moved the children to England for their education, they only saw them again during their next leave in 1939 and then did not see them again until they returned to England after the war. In June 1946 Moreau developed choroiditis which threatened his eyesight. This led to his leaving Africa and retiring to England. He published nearly 80 papers while at Amani but still had work to be done. David Lack offered him a part-time position at the Edward Grey Institute while Thorpe offered him a place in his Cambridge section of Animal Behaviour. He also was invited to the editorship of the ornithological journal, Ibis. He received an honorary Master of Arts degree from the University of Oxford on 15 December 1951. He retired from the editorship of Ibis in 1960 and from the Edward Grey Institute in July 1964. The British Ornithologists' Union awarded him the Godman-Salvin award at their Annual General Meeting on 3 April 1966.

== Ornithological pioneer ==
Moreau was among the pioneering ornithologists who focused on life-history studies of birds. In 1944 he suggested in a paper in the Ibis that birds, even of the same or very closely related species, laid larger clutches of eggs in the higher latitudes than in the tropics. This was based on his studies of birds in Africa through the collection of large amounts of data often collected by his African assistants. This data and the general trend that was confirmed opened up a very active debate on avian clutch size. Theoretically birds should be laying as many eggs as they can across the world. One idea proposed by Alexander Skutch was that the clutch size had evolved so that the death rate is offset so that bird populations are more or less stable. Another theory proposed by David Lack was that the number of eggs laid was fine tuned by the availability of resources such as food that are available for raising the young successfully. This debate would also lead to more fundamental questions related to the unit of selection and ideas on group selection.

Moreau examined the migrations of birds from Europe into Africa and noticed that in the Sahel region, the densities of insectivorous migrants was much greater in the sparse thorny vegetation than in other kinds of apparently richer savanna vegetation just further south of the Sahel. This has been called Moreau's paradox and has been explained as being caused by the difference in insect densities on these plants. The thorny plants are adapted against large herbivore grazing and may have relatively lower chemical defences leading to greater arthropod densities than the larger trees that have foliage protected by chemical defences.

== Later life ==
After returning from Africa, Moreau settled in "the tiny and unregarded Oxfordshire village of Berrick Salome". He wrote, "in 1965 I realized suddenly that, because Berrick was so small and because we were fortunate in still having several people whose clear recollections reached back to between 1890 and 1910, it might be possible to build up for a period about the turn of the century a picture of more than purely local interest." His study was published Oxford University Press in 1968 as The Departed Village: Berrick Salome at the Turn of the Century.

He died at Hereford, England, on 30 May 1970. He is buried, alongside his wife, Winnie, in the churchyard of Sutton St Michael.
